= Buenos Aires =

Capital and most populous city of Argentina

- Capital and autonomous city
- Autonomous City of Buenos Aires; Ciudad Autónoma de Buenos Aires (Spanish)
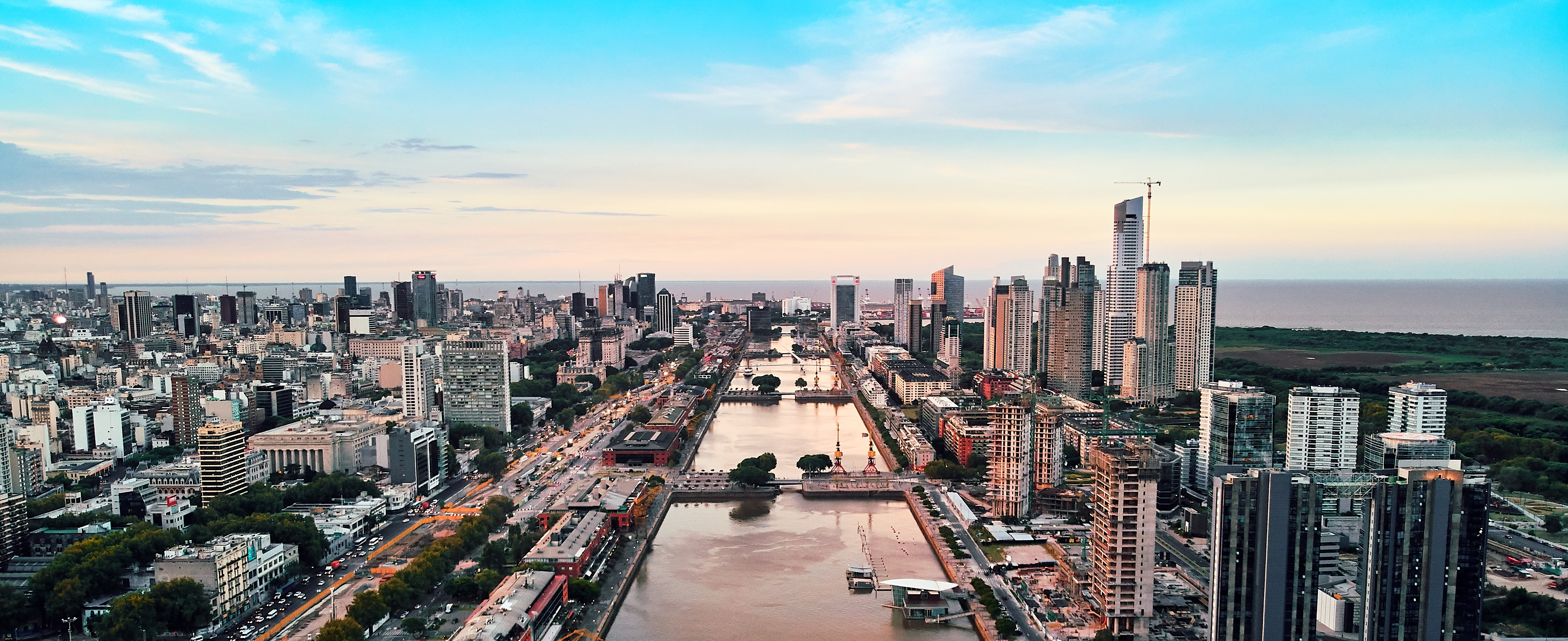
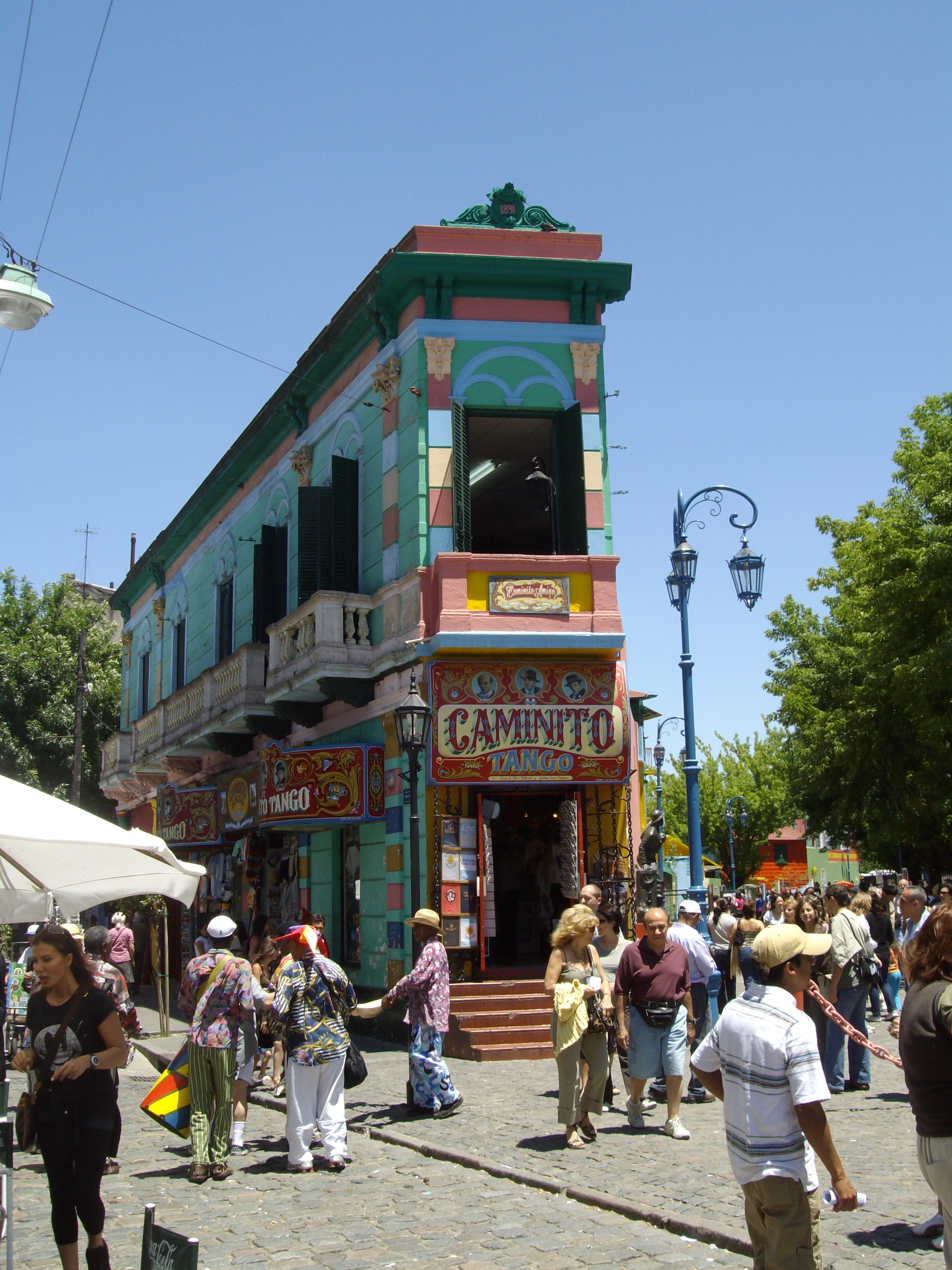
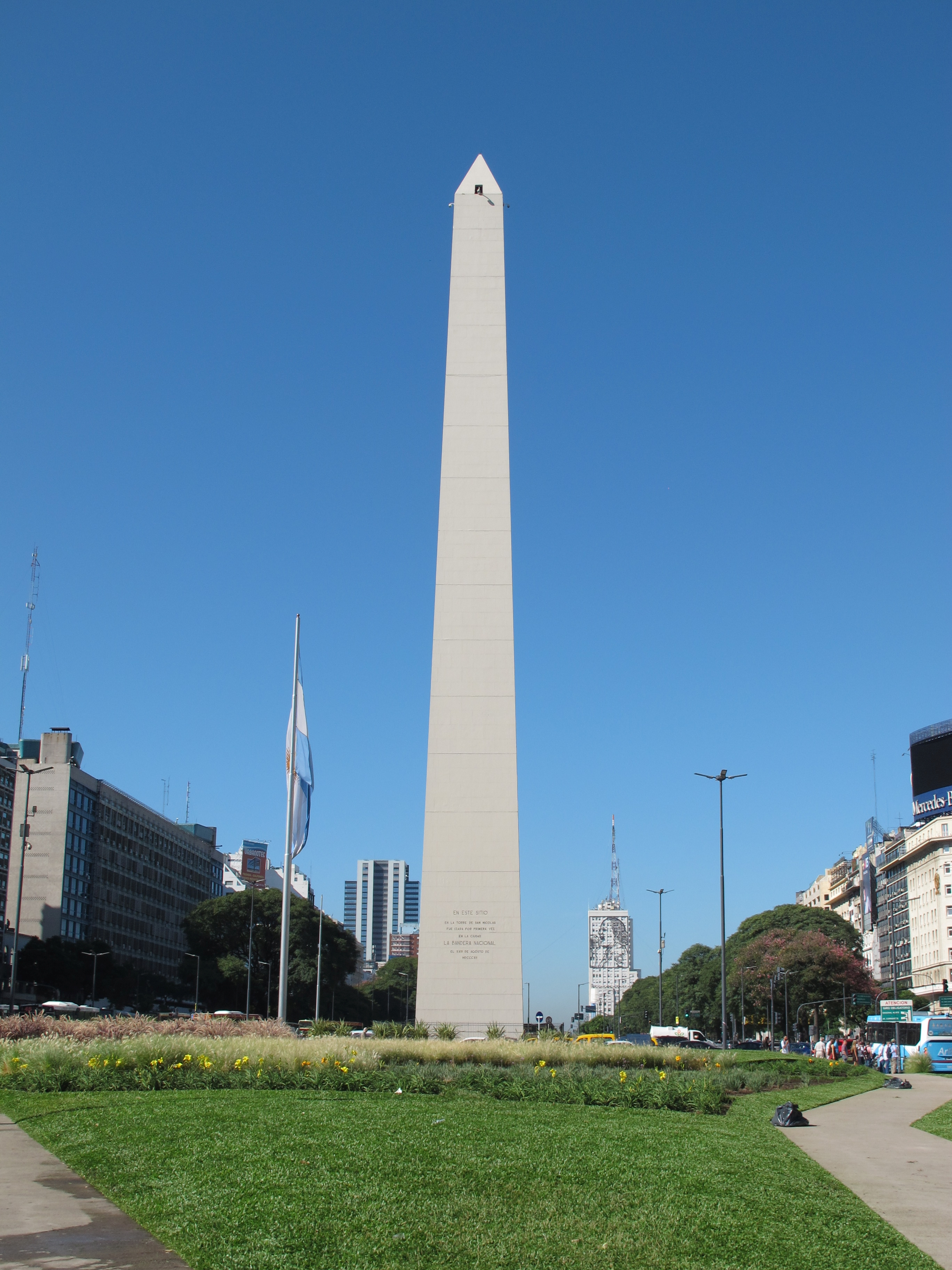
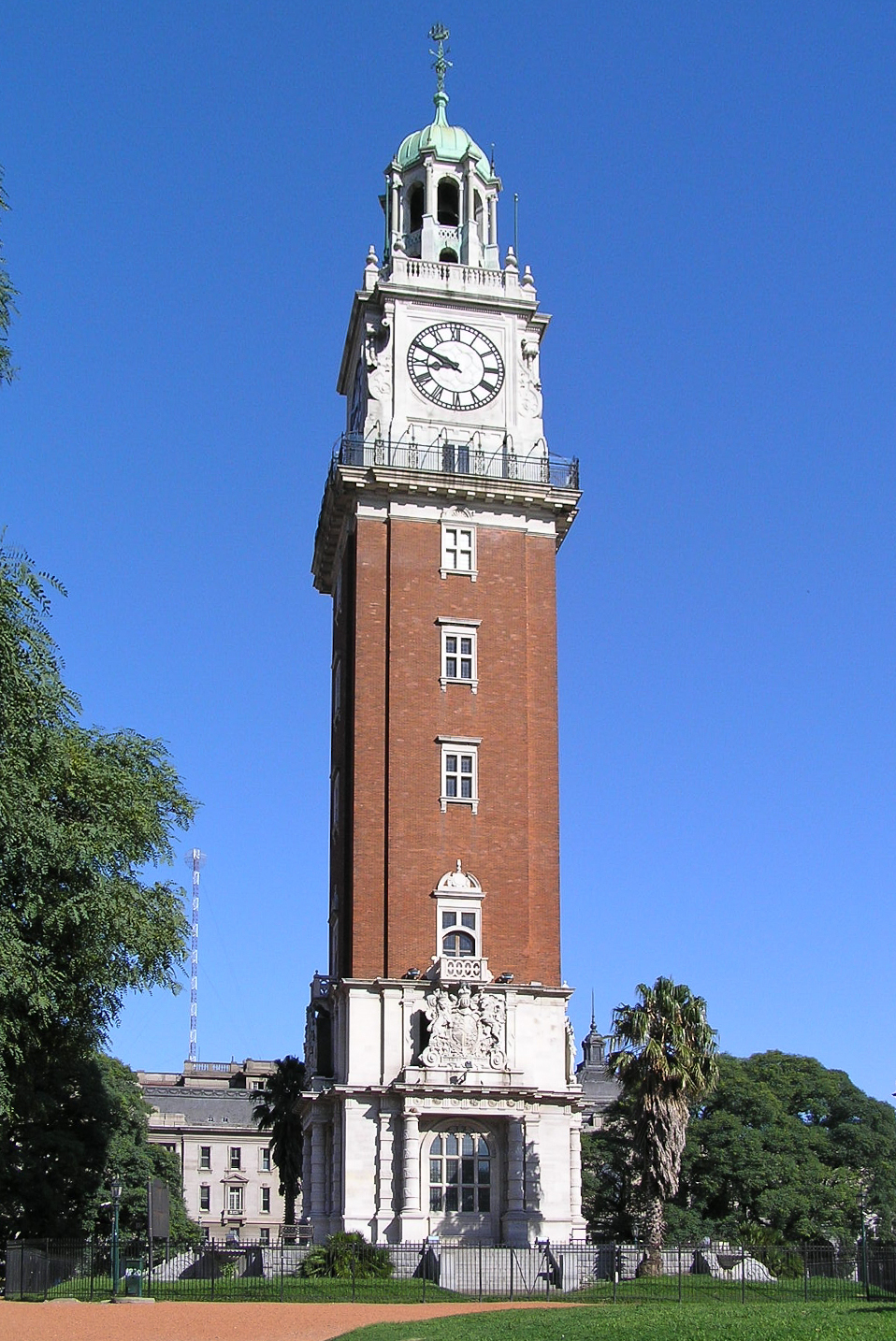
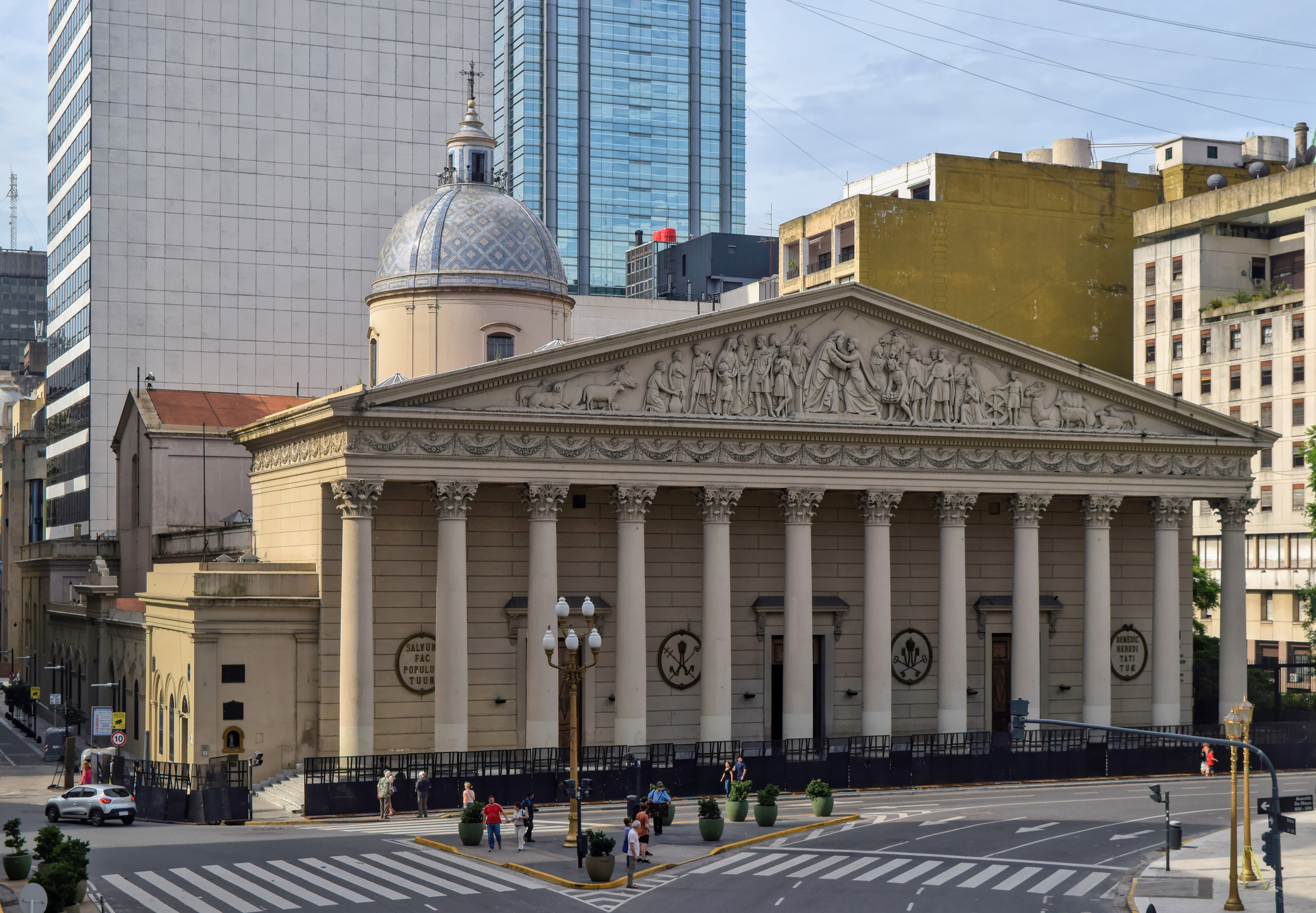
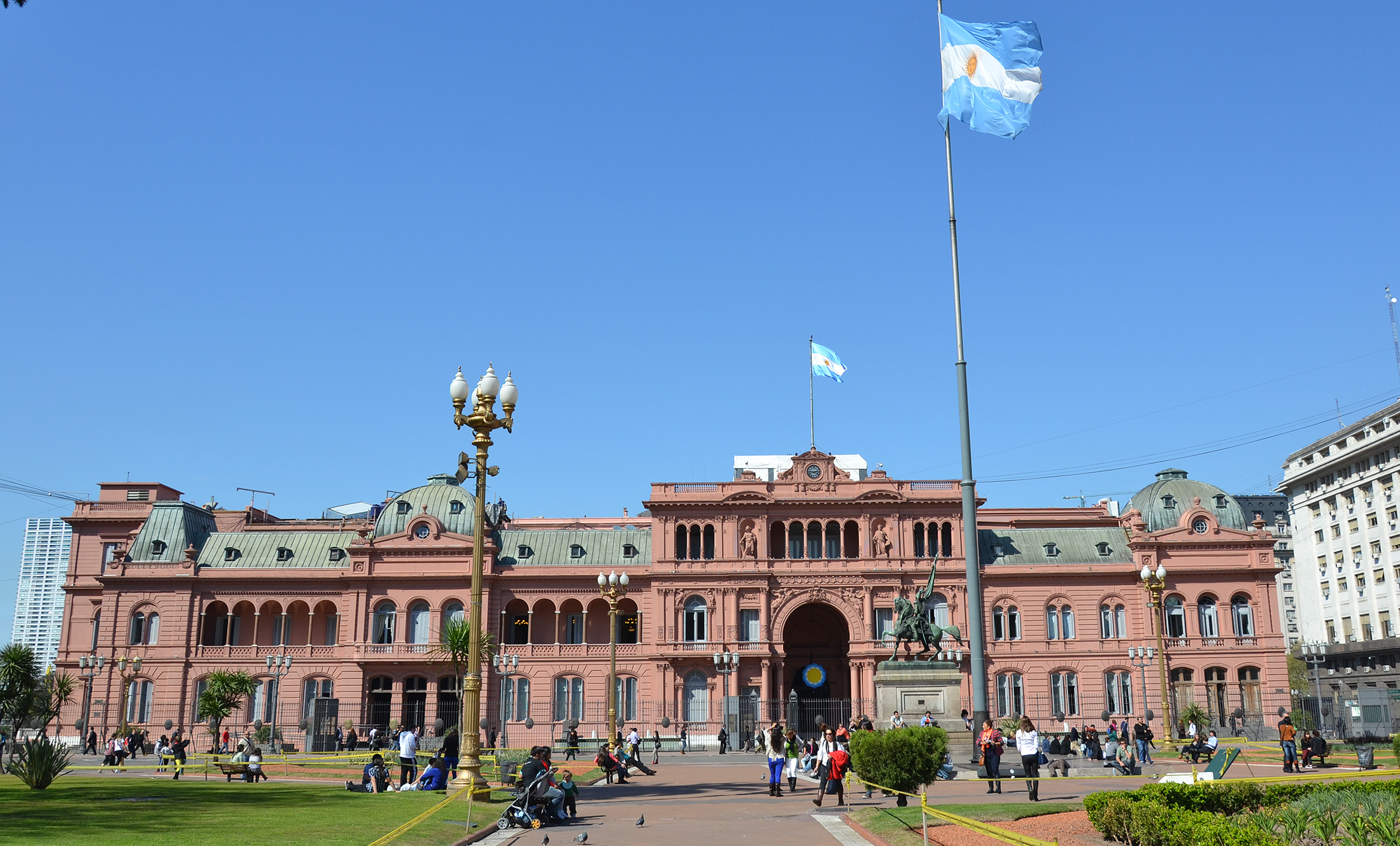
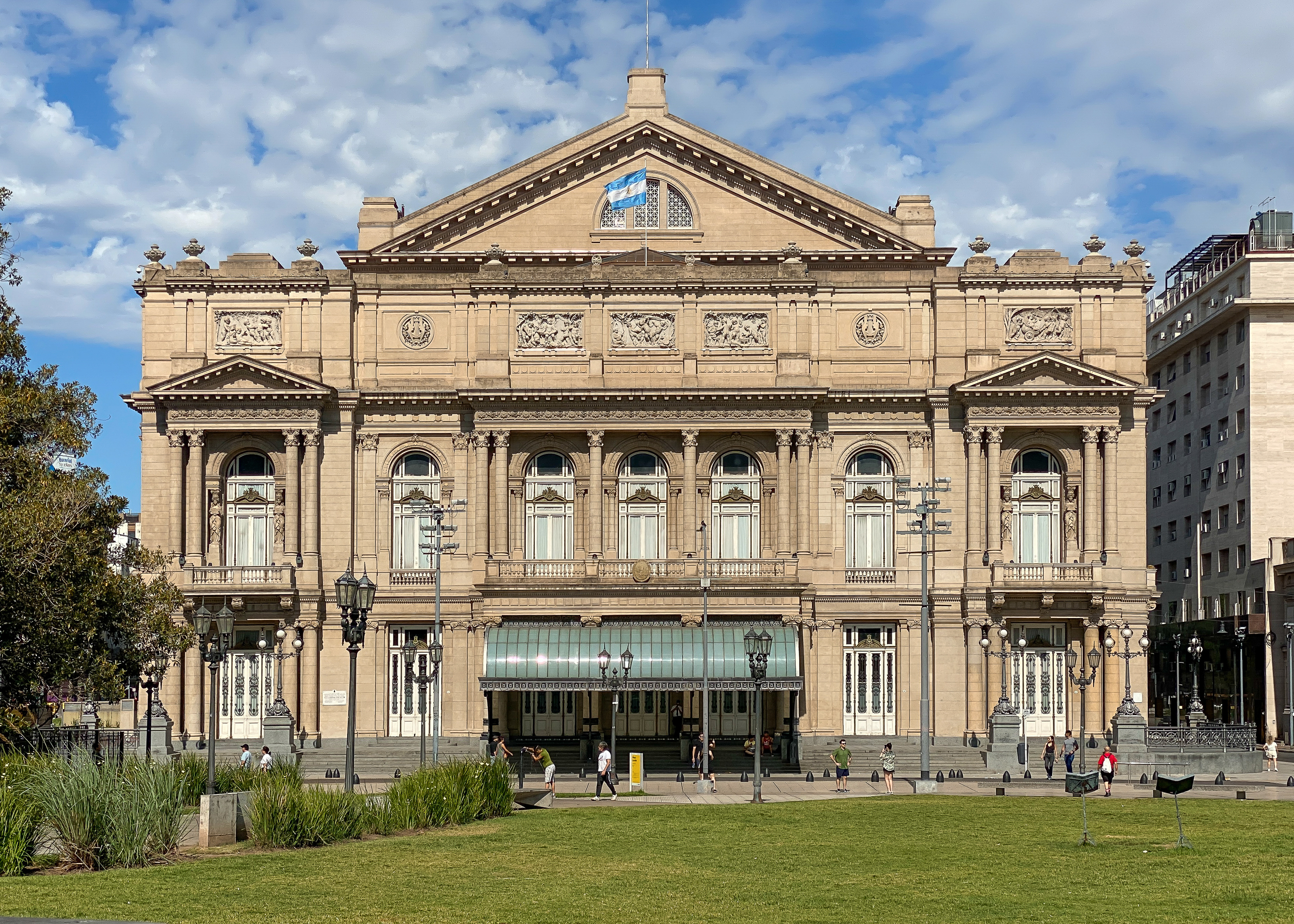
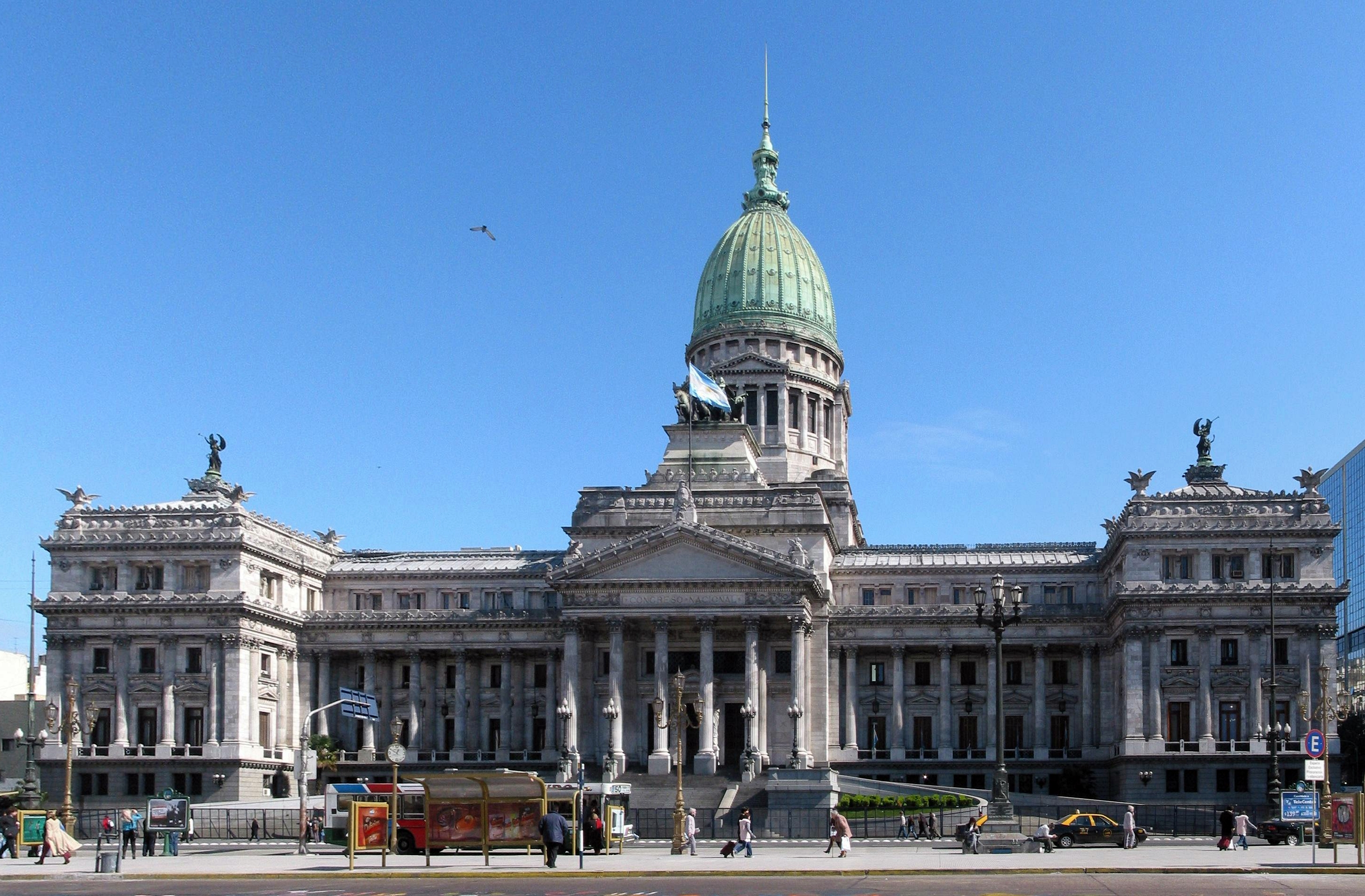
- Skyline of Puerto Madero Caminito in La Boca Obelisco de Buenos Aires Torre Monumental Buenos Aires Metropolitan Cathedral Casa Rosada and the Plaza de Mayo Teatro Colón Palace of the Argentine National Congress

- Flag Coat of arms Logo
- Nicknames: Baires, The Queen of El Plata (La reina del Plata); The Paris of South America (La París de Sudamérica)
- Interactive map of Buenos Aires
- Location within Argentina Location within South America
- Coordinates: 34°36′14″S 58°22′53″W
- Country: Argentina
- Established: 2 February 1536; 490 years ago (by Pedro de Mendoza)
- Reestablished: 11 June 1580; 446 years ago (by Juan de Garay)
- Districts: 15

Government
  - Type: Autonomous
  - Body: City Legislature
  - Chief of Government: Jorge Macri (PRO)
  - Deputy Chief of Government: Clara Muzzio
  - National Deputies: 25
  - National Senators: Patricia Bullrich (LLA); Agustín Monteverde (LLA); Mariano Recalde (FP)

Area
  - Capital and autonomous city: 205.9 km^{2} (79.5 sq mi)
  - Urban (Note: Greater Buenos Aires – Autonomous City and 24 districts (partidos)): 3,979.2 km^{2} (1,536.4 sq mi)
  - Metro (Note: According to INDEC, the Metropolitan Region of Buenos Aires has Autonomous City and 39 districts (partidos): Almirante Brown, Avellaneda, Berazategui, Berisso, Brandsen, Campana, Cañuelas, Ensenada, Escobar, Esteban Echeverría, Exaltación de la Cruz, Ezeiza, Florencio Varela, General Rodríguez, General San Martín, Hurlingham, Ituzaingó, José C. Paz, La Matanza, Lanús, La Plata, Lomas de Zamora, Luján, Malvinas Argentinas, Marcos Paz, Merlo, Moreno, Morón, Pilar, Presidente Perón, Quilmes, San Fernando, San Isidro, San Miguel, San Vicente, Tigre, Tres de Febrero, Vicente López y Zárate.): 13,267 km^{2} (5,122 sq mi)
- Elevation: 25 m (82 ft)

Population (2022 census)
  - Capital and autonomous city: 3,121,707
  - Rank: 1st in Argentina; 7th in South America
  - Density: 15,161/km^{2} (39,270/sq mi)
  - Urban: 13,971,006
  - Urban density: 3,511/km^{2} (9,090/sq mi)
  - Metro: 16,366,641
  - Metro density: 1,234/km^{2} (3,200/sq mi)
- Demonyms: porteño (m), porteña (f)

GDP (Nominal, 2023)
  - Metro: US$ 235.6 billion
  - Per capita: US$ 15,200
- Time zone: UTC−03:00 (ART)
- Postal codes: B1601XXX to B8512XXX
- Area code: 011
- ISO 3166 code: AR-C
- HDI (2021): 0.882 very high (1st)
- Website: buenosaires.gob.ar

Buenos Aires, (Note: English: /ˌbweɪnəs ˈɛəriːz/ BWAY-nəs AIR-eez or /- ˈaɪrɪs/ - EYE-riss; Spanish: [ˈbwenos ˈajɾes]; lit. 'Good Winds'.) officially the Autonomous City of Buenos Aires, (Note: Spanish: Ciudad Autónoma de Buenos Aires (CABA); its constitution also assumes "City of Buenos Aires" as a name they control and regulate.) is the capital and largest city of Argentina. It is located on the southwest of the Río de la Plata. Buenos Aires is classified as an Alpha− global city, according to the GaWC 2024 ranking. The city proper has a population of 3.1 million and its urban area has a population of 16.7 million, making it the 21st most populous metropolitan area in the world.

It is known for its preserved eclectic European architecture and rich cultural life. It is a multicultural city that is home to multiple ethnic and religious groups, contributing to its culture as well as to the dialect spoken in the city and in other parts of the country. Since the 19th century, the city, and the country in general, has been a major recipient of millions of immigrants from all over the world, making it a melting pot where many ethnic groups live together. Buenos Aires is considered one of the most diverse cities of the Americas.

The city of Buenos Aires is an autonomous district and is neither part of Buenos Aires Province nor its capital. In 1880, after the Argentine Civil War, Buenos Aires was federalized and split from Buenos Aires Province. The city limits were enlarged to include the towns of Belgrano and Flores, both now neighborhoods of the city. The 1994 constitutional amendment granted the city autonomy, hence its formal name of Autonomous City of Buenos Aires. Citizens elected their first chief of government in 1996. Previously, the mayor was directly appointed by the president of Argentina.

The Greater Buenos Aires conurbation includes several surrounding cities, which are located in the neighbouring districts of the Buenos Aires Province. It constitutes the fourth-most populous metropolitan area in the Americas. It is also the second largest city south of the Tropic of Capricorn. Buenos Aires has the highest human development of all Argentine administrative divisions. Its quality of life was ranked 97th in the world in 2024, being one of the best in Latin America.

== Etymology ==
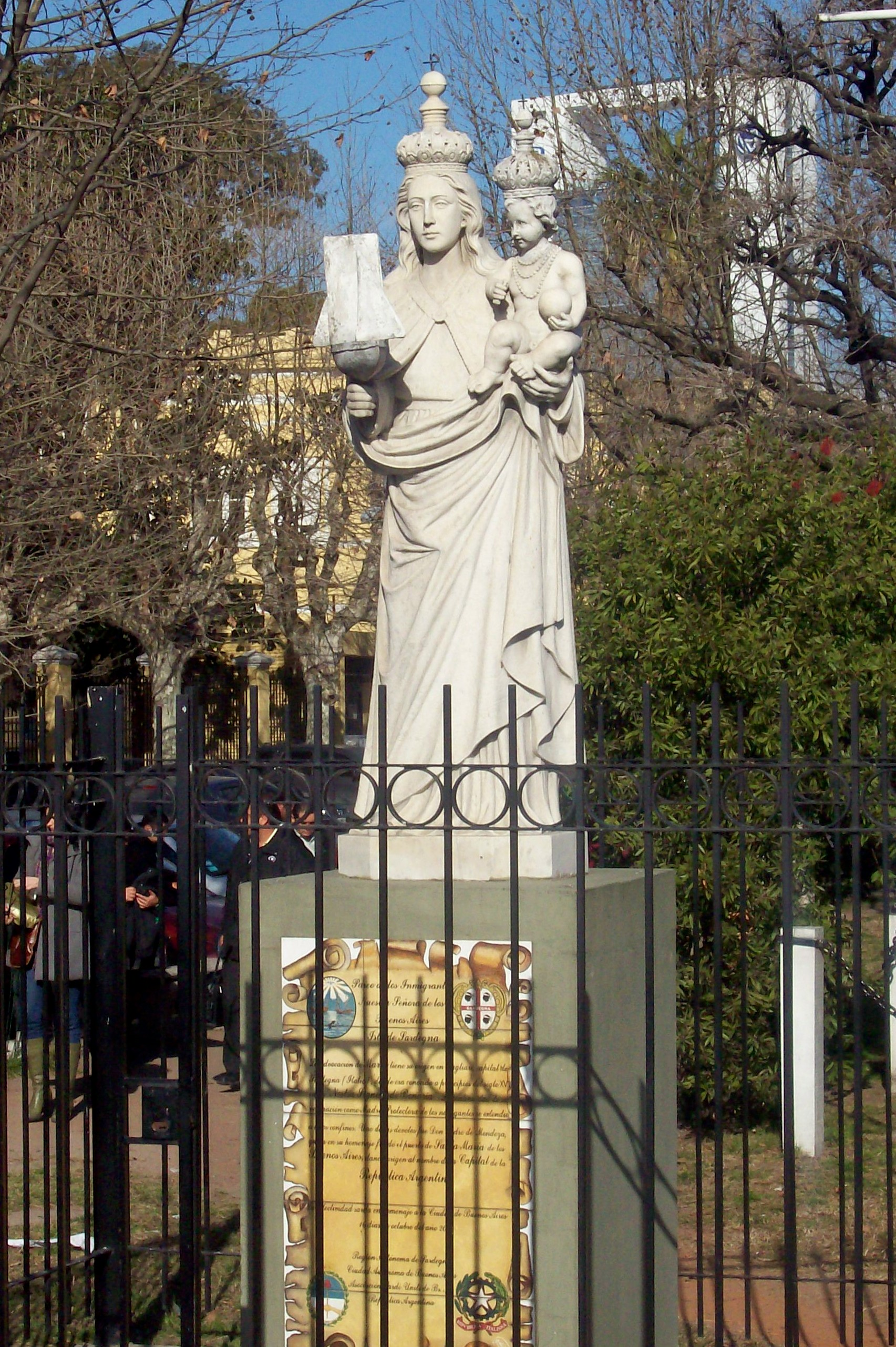
Our Lady of the Buen Aire in front of the National Migration Department

Aragonese archives record that Catalan missionaries and Jesuits arriving in Cagliari (Sardinia) under the Crown of Aragon, after its capture from the Pisans in 1324, established their headquarters on top of a hill that overlooked the city. The hill was known to them as Bonaira (or Bonaria in Sardinian), as it was free of the foul smell prevalent in the old city (the castle area), which was adjacent to swampland. During the siege of Cagliari, the Catalans built a sanctuary to the Virgin Mary on top of the hill. In 1335, King Alfonso the Gentle donated the church to the Mercedarians, who built an abbey that stands to this day. In the years after that, a story circulated, claiming that a statue of the Virgin Mary was retrieved from the sea after it miraculously calmed a storm in the Mediterranean Sea. The statue was placed in the abbey. Spanish sailors, especially Andalusians, venerated this image and frequently invoked the "Fair Winds" to aid them in their navigation and prevent shipwrecks. A sanctuary to the Virgin of the Buen Ayre would later be erected in Seville.

At the foundation of Buenos Aires, Spanish sailors arrived in the Río de la Plata giving thanks to the blessings of Santa Maria de los Buenos Aires, 'Holy Mary of the Good Winds', who they believed to have given them the good winds to reach the coast of what is today the modern city. Pedro de Mendoza called the city 'Holy Mary of the Fair Winds', a name suggested by the chaplain of Mendoza's expedition – a devotee of the Virgin of Buen Ayre – after the Madonna of Bonaria from Sardinia (which is still to this day the patroness of the Mediterranean island). Mendoza's settlement soon came under attack by indigenous people and was abandoned in 1541.

For many years, the name was attributed to a Sancho del Campo, who is said to have exclaimed: "How fair are the winds of this land!" as he arrived. In 1882, after conducting extensive research in Spanish archives, Argentine merchant Eduardo Madero ultimately concluded that the name was instead closely linked with the devotion of the sailors to Our Lady of Buen Ayre. A second (and permanent) settlement was established in 1580 by Juan de Garay, who sailed down the Paraná River from Asunción, now the capital of Paraguay. Garay preserved the name originally chosen by Mendoza, calling the city Ciudad de la Santísima Trinidad y Puerto de Santa María del Buen Aire ('City of the Most Holy Trinity and Port of Saint Mary of the Fair Winds'). The short form that eventually became the city's name, "Buenos Aires", became commonly used during the 17th century.

The usual abbreviation for Buenos Aires in Spanish is Bs.As. It is also common to refer to it as "B.A." or "BA". When referring specifically to the autonomous city, it is very common to colloquially call it "Capital" in Spanish. Since the autonomy obtained in 1994, it has been called "CABA" (per Ciudad Autónoma de Buenos Aires, 'Autonomous City of Buenos Aires').

== History ==
Timeline of Buenos Aires
Historical affiliations

Kingdom of Spain - Habsburg, 1536–1700
Kingdom of Spain - Bourbon, 1700–1808
Kingdom of Spain - Bonaparte, 1808–1810
United Provinces of the Río de la Plata, 1810–1831
Argentine Confederation, 1831–1852
State of Buenos Aires, 1852–1861
Argentina, 1861–present

=== Viceregal times ===
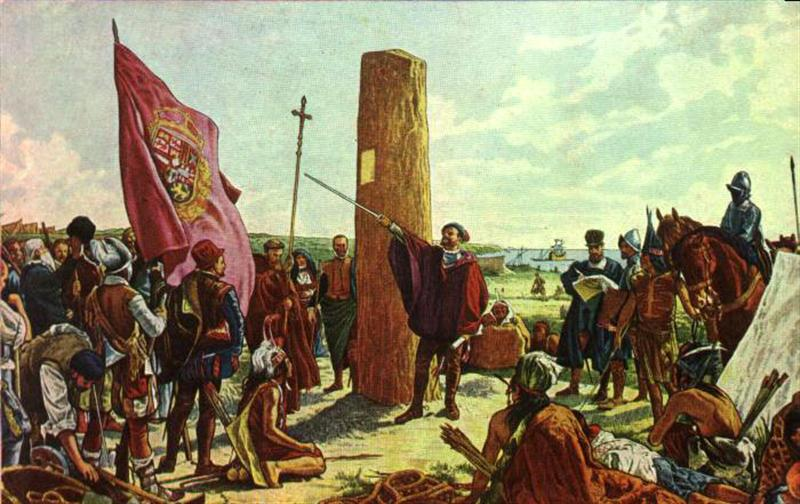
Juan de Garay founding Buenos Aires in 1580. The initial settlement, founded by Pedro de Mendoza, had been abandoned since 1542.

In 1516, navigator and explorer Juan Díaz de Solís, navigating in the name of Spain, was the first European to reach the Río de la Plata. His expedition was cut short when he was killed during an attack by the native Charrúa tribe in what is now Uruguay. The city of Buenos Aires was first established as Ciudad de Nuestra Señora Santa María del Buen Ayre (literally "City of Our Lady Saint Mary of the Fair Winds") after Our Lady of Bonaria (Patroness Saint of Sardinia) on 2 February 1536 by a Spanish expedition led by Pedro de Mendoza. The settlement founded by Mendoza was located in what is today the San Telmo district of Buenos Aires, south of the city center.

More attacks by the indigenous people forced the settlers away, and in 1542, the site was abandoned. A second (and permanent) settlement was established on 11 June 1580 by Juan de Garay, who arrived by sailing down the Paraná River from Asunción (now the capital of Paraguay). He dubbed the settlement "Santísima Trinidad" and its port became "Puerto de Santa María de los Buenos Aires."

From its earliest days, Buenos Aires depended primarily on trade. During most of the 17th century, Spanish ships were menaced by pirates, so they developed a complex system whereby ships with military protection were dispatched to Central America in a convoy from Seville (the only port allowed to trade with the American colonies) to Lima, Peru, and from there to the other cities of the viceroyalty. Because of this, products took a very long time to arrive in Buenos Aires, and the taxes generated by the transport made them prohibitive. This scheme frustrated the traders of Buenos Aires, and a thriving informal, yet tolerated by the authorities, contraband industry developed inside the viceroyalties and with the Portuguese. This also instilled a deep resentment among porteños towards the Spanish authorities.

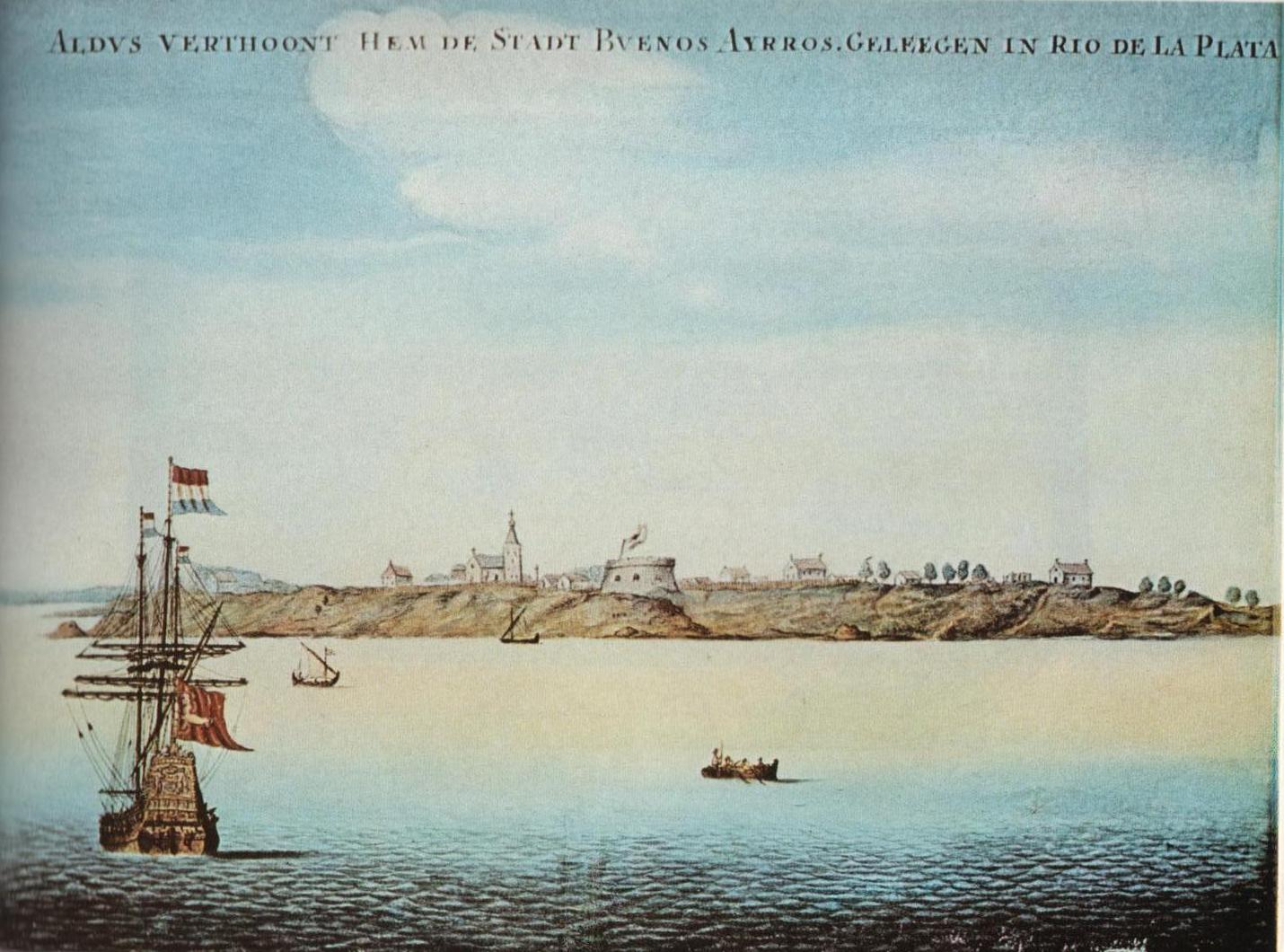
Aldus verthoont hem de stadt Buenos Ayrros geleegen in Rio de la Plata, painting by a Dutch sailor who anchored at the port around 1628

Charles III of Spain progressively eased the trade restrictions before finally declaring Buenos Aires an open port in the late 18th century. The capture of Portobelo in Panama by British forces also fueled the need to foster commerce via the Atlantic route, to the detriment of Lima-based trade. One of his rulings was to split a region from the Viceroyalty of Perú and create instead the Viceroyalty of the Río de la Plata, with Buenos Aires as the capital. However, Charles's placating actions did not have the desired effect, and the porteños, some of them versed in the ideology of the French Revolution, instead became even more convinced of the need for independence from Spain.

=== War of Independence ===
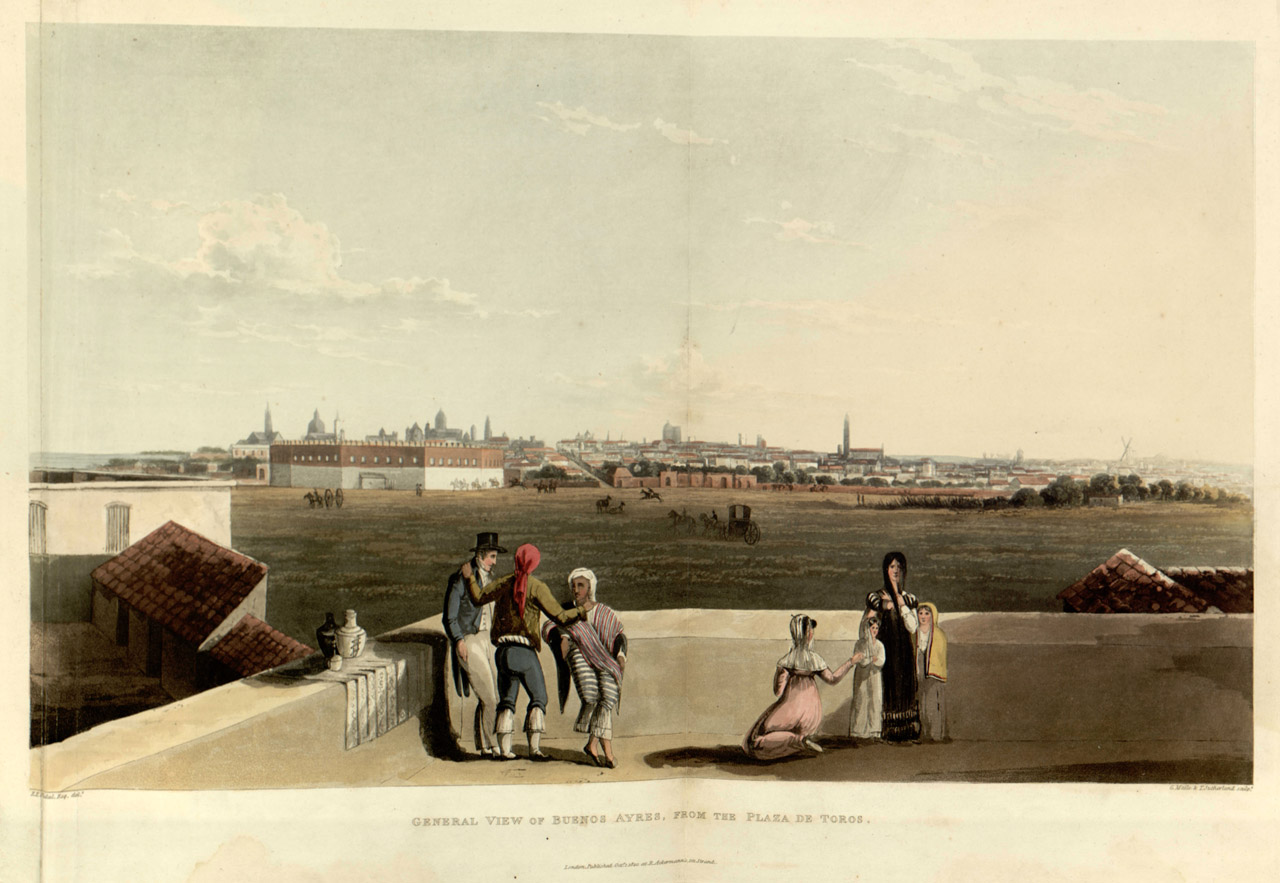
Emeric Essex Vidal, General view of Buenos Ayres from the Plaza de Toros, 1820. In this area now lies the Plaza San Martín.

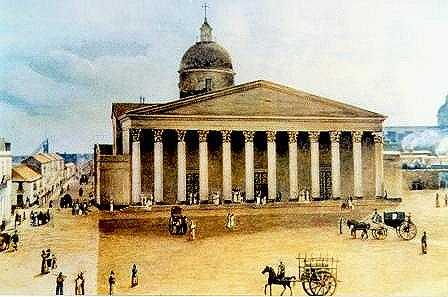
Impression of the Buenos Aires Cathedral by Carlos Pellegrini, 1829

During the British invasions of the Río de la Plata, British forces attacked Buenos Aires twice. In 1806 the British successfully invaded Buenos Aires, but an army from Montevideo led by Santiago de Liniers defeated them. In the brief period of British rule, the viceroy Rafael Sobremonte managed to escape to Córdoba and designated this city as capital. Buenos Aires became the capital again after its recapture by Argentine forces, but Sobremonte could not resume his duties as viceroy. Santiago de Liniers, chosen as new viceroy, prepared the city against a possible new British attack and repelled a second invasion by Britain in 1807. The militarization generated in society changed the balance of power favorably for the criollos (in contrast to peninsulars), as well as the development of the Peninsular War in Spain.

An attempt by the peninsular merchant Martín de Álzaga to remove Liniers and replace him with a Junta was defeated by the criollo armies. However, by 1810 it would be those same armies who would support a new revolutionary attempt, successfully removing the new viceroy Baltasar Hidalgo de Cisneros. This is known as the May Revolution, which is now celebrated as a national holiday. This event started the Argentine War of Independence, and many armies left Buenos Aires to fight the diverse strongholds of royalist resistance, with varying levels of success. The government was held first by two Juntas of many members, then by two triumvirates, and finally by a unipersonal office, the Supreme Director. Formal independence from Spain was declared in 1816, at the Congress of Tucumán. Buenos Aires managed to endure the whole Spanish American wars of independence without falling again under royalist rule.

Historically, Buenos Aires has been Argentina's main venue of liberal, free-trading, and foreign ideas. In contrast, many of the provinces, especially those to the city's northwest, advocated a more nationalistic and Catholic approach to political and social issues. In fact, much of the internal tension in Argentina's history, starting with the centralist-federalist conflicts of the 19th century, can be traced back to these contrasting views. In the months immediately following said "May Revolution", Buenos Aires sent a number of military envoys to the provinces with the intention of obtaining their approval. Instead, the enterprise fueled tensions between the capital and the provinces; many of these missions ended in violent clashes.

In the 19th century the city was blockaded twice by naval forces: by the French from 1838 to 1840, and later by an Anglo-French expedition from 1845 to 1848. Both blockades failed to bring the Argentine government to the negotiating table, to the frustration of British Parliament in 1847, with the foreign powers eventually desisting from their demands.

=== 19th and 20th centuries ===
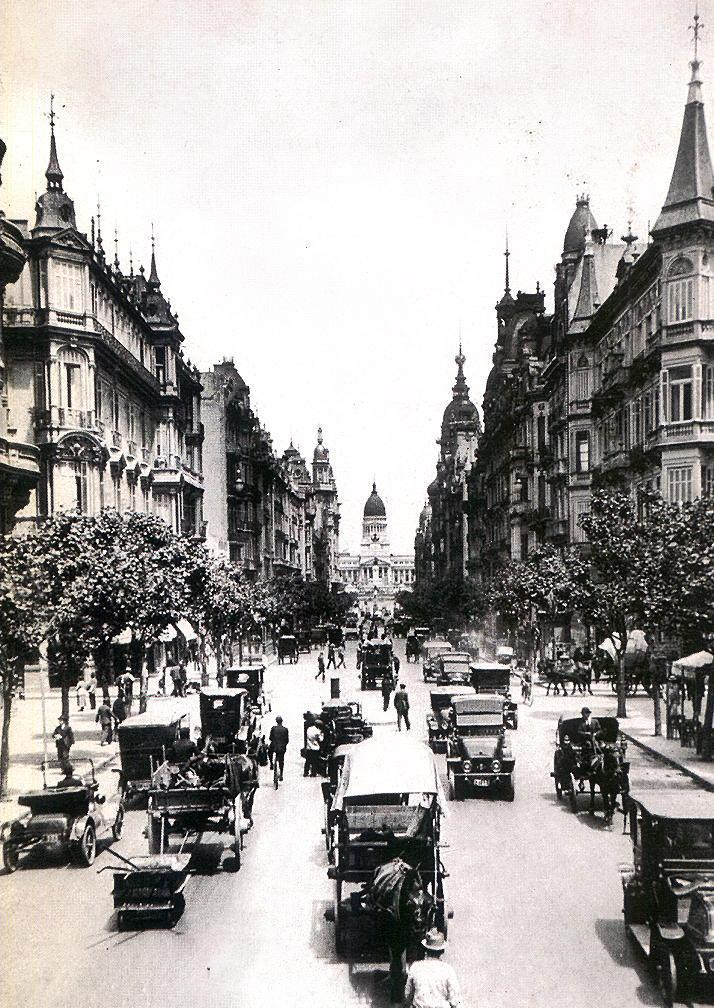
View of the Avenida de Mayo in 1915

During most of the 19th century, the political status of the city remained a sensitive subject. It was already the capital of Buenos Aires Province, and between 1853 and 1860 it was the capital of the seceded State of Buenos Aires. The issue was fought out more than once on the battlefield, until the matter was finally settled in 1880 when the city was federalized and became the seat of government, with its mayor appointed by the president. The Casa Rosada became the seat of the president.

Health conditions in poor areas were appalling, with high rates of tuberculosis. Contemporaneous public health physicians and politicians typically blamed both the poor themselves and their ramshackle tenement houses (conventillos) for the spread of the dreaded disease. People ignored public-health campaigns to limit the spread of contagious diseases, such as the prohibition of spitting on the streets, the strict guidelines to care for infants and young children, and quarantines that separated families from ill loved ones.

In addition to the wealth generated by customs duties and Argentine foreign trade in general, as well as the existence of fertile pampas, railroad development in the second half of the 19th century increased the economic power of Buenos Aires as raw materials flowed into its factories. In 1888, by Law 2089, the national government of Argentina expanded the City of Buenos Aires by annexing the towns of Belgrano, Flores, and parts of General San Martín Partido, such as today's Villa Devoto. A leading destination for immigrants from Europe, particularly Italy and Spain, from 1880 to 1930, Buenos Aires became a multicultural city that ranked itself alongside the major European capitals. During this time, the Colón Theater became one of the world's top opera venues, and the city became the regional capital of radio, television, cinema, and theater. The city's main avenues were built during those years, and the dawn of the 20th century saw the construction of South America's tallest buildings and its first underground system. A second construction boom, from 1945 to 1980, reshaped downtown and much of the city.

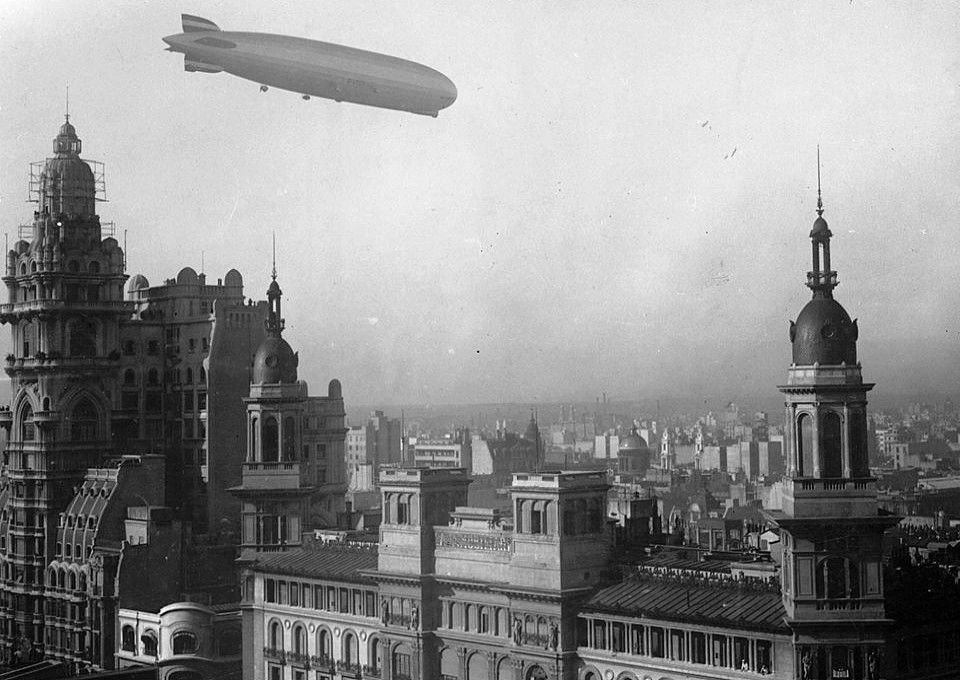
LZ 127 Graf Zeppelin flying near the Barolo Palace in Buenos Aires on June 30, 1934.

Buenos Aires also attracted migrants from Argentina's provinces and neighboring countries. Shanty towns (villas miseria) started growing around the city's industrial areas during the 1930s, leading to pervasive social problems and social contrasts with the largely upwardly mobile Buenos Aires population. These laborers became the political base of Peronism, which emerged in Buenos Aires during the pivotal demonstration of 17 October 1945, at the Plaza de Mayo. Industrial workers of the Greater Buenos Aires industrial belt have been Peronism's main support base ever since, and Plaza de Mayo became the site for demonstrations and many of the country's political events; on 16 June 1955, however, a splinter faction of the Navy bombed the Plaza de Mayo area, killing 364 civilians (see Bombing of Plaza de Mayo). This was the only time the city was attacked from the air, and the event was followed by a military uprising which deposed President Perón, three months later (see Revolución Libertadora).

In the 1970s the city suffered from the fighting between left-wing revolutionary movements (Montoneros, ERP and F.A.R.) and the right-wing paramilitary group Triple A, supported by Isabel Perón, who became president of Argentina in 1974 after Juan Perón's death.

The March 1976 coup, led by General Jorge Videla, only escalated this conflict; the "Dirty War" resulted in 30,000 desaparecidos (people kidnapped and killed by the military during the years of the junta). The silent marches of their mothers (Mothers of the Plaza de Mayo) are a well-known image of Argentines' suffering during those times. The dictatorship's appointed mayor, Osvaldo Cacciatore, also drew up plans for a network of freeways intended to relieve the city's acute traffic gridlock. The plan, however, called for a seemingly indiscriminate razing of residential areas and, though only three of the eight planned were put up at the time, they were mostly obtrusive raised freeways that continue to blight a number of formerly comfortable neighborhoods to this day.

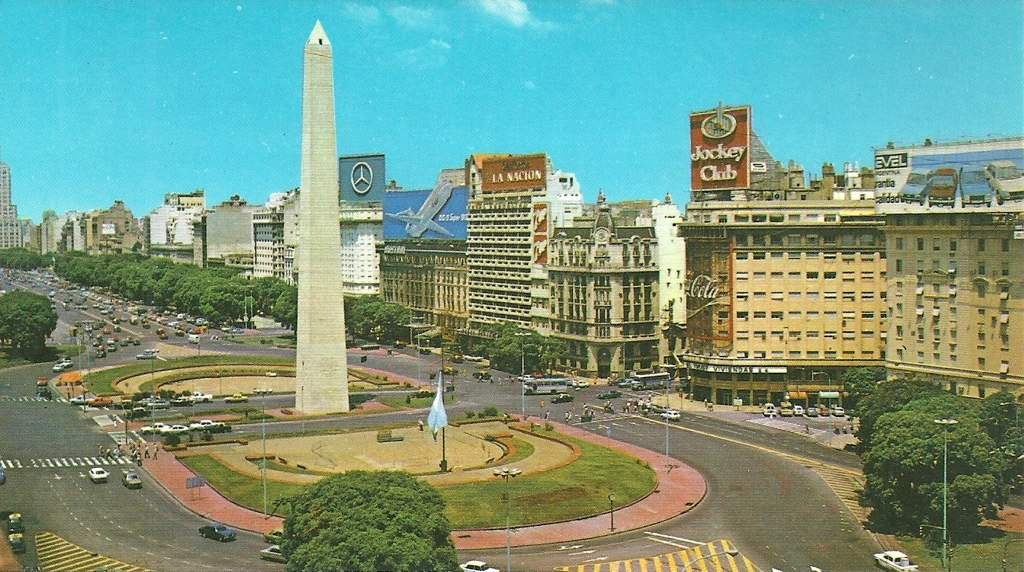
9 de Julio Avenue, 1986

The city was visited by Pope John Paul II twice, firstly in 1982 and again in 1987; on these occasions gathered some of the largest crowds in the city's history. The return of democracy in 1983 coincided with a cultural revival, and the 1990s saw an economic revival, particularly in the construction and financial sectors.

On 17 March 1992, a bomb exploded in the Israeli Embassy, killing 29 and injuring 242. Another explosion, on 18 July 1994, destroyed a building housing several Jewish organizations, killing 85 and injuring many more, these incidents marked the beginning of Middle Eastern terrorism to South America. Following a 1993 agreement, the Argentine Constitution was amended to give Buenos Aires autonomy and rescinding, among other things, the president's right to appoint the city's mayor (as had been the case since 1880). On 30 June 1996, voters in Buenos Aires chose their first elected mayor, Jefe de Gobierno.

=== 21st century ===
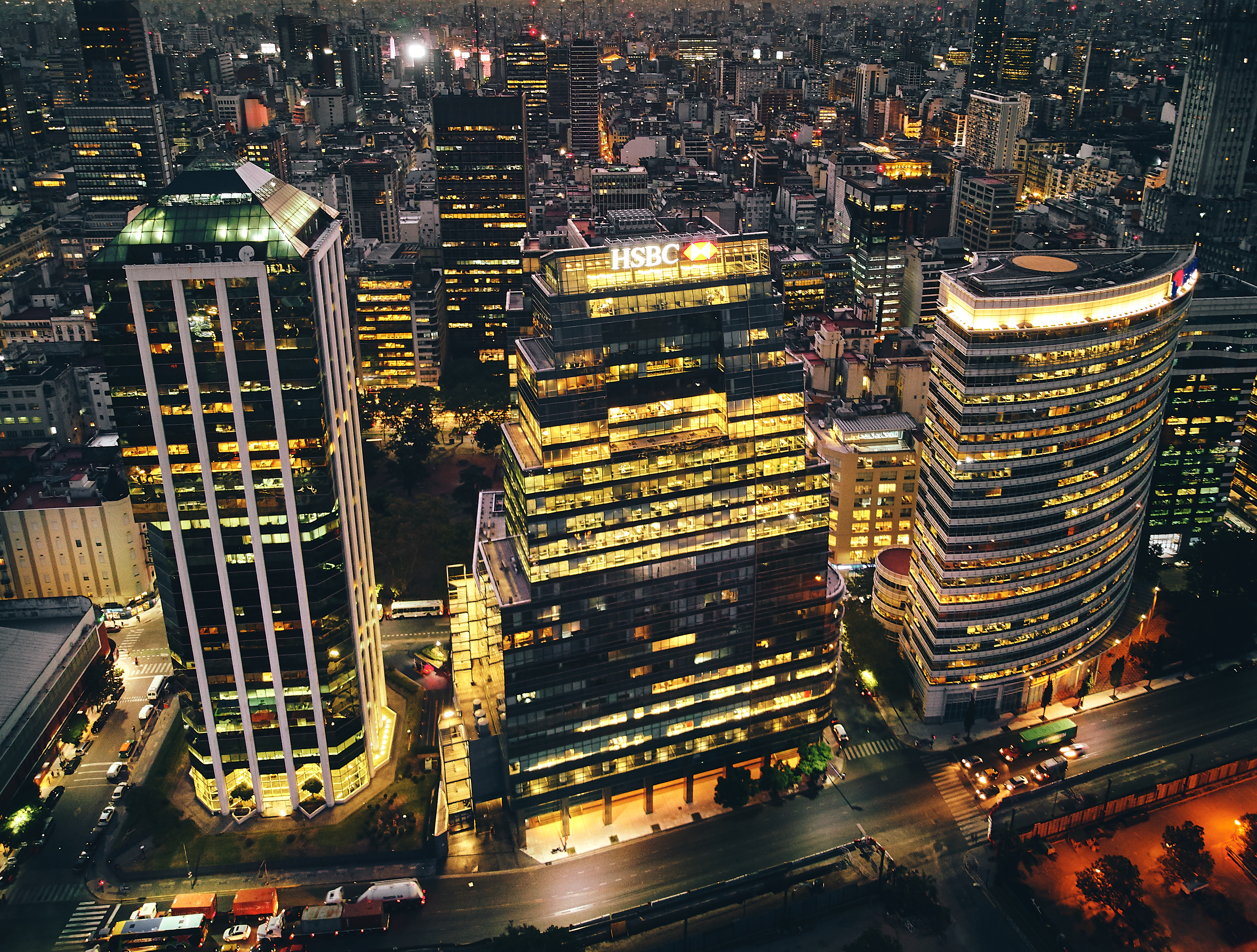
Catalinas Norte is an important business complex composed of nineteen commercial office buildings and occupied by numerous leading Argentine companies, foreign subsidiaries, and diplomatic offices. It is located in the Buenos Aires Central Business District.

In 1996, following the 1994 reform of the Argentine Constitution, the city held its first mayoral elections under the new statutes, with the mayor's title formally changed to "Head of Government". The winner was Fernando de la Rúa, who would later become President of Argentina from 1999 to 2001.

De la Rúa's successor, Aníbal Ibarra, won two popular elections, but was impeached (and ultimately deposed on 6 March 2006) as a result of the fire at the República Cromagnon nightclub. In the meantime, Jorge Telerman, who had been the acting mayor, was invested with the office. In the 2007 elections, Mauricio Macri of the Republican Proposal (PRO) party won the second-round of voting over Daniel Filmus of the Frente para la Victoria (FPV) party, taking office on 9 December 2007. In 2011, the elections went to a second round with 60.96 percent of the vote for PRO, compared to 39.04 percent for FPV, thus ensuring Macri's reelection as mayor of the city with María Eugenia Vidal as deputy mayor.

PRO is established in the most affluent area of the city and in those over fifty years of age.

The 2015 elections were the first to use an electronic voting system in the city, similar to the one used in Salta Province. In these elections held on 5 July 2015, Macri stepped down as mayor and pursue his presidential bid and Horacio Rodríguez Larreta took his place as the mayoral candidate for PRO. In the first round of voting, FPV's Mariano Recalde obtained 21.78% of the vote, while Martín Lousteau of the ECO party obtained 25.59% and Larreta obtained 45.55%, meaning that the elections went to a second round since PRO was unable to secure the majority required for victory. The second round was held on 19 July 2015 and Larreta obtained 51.6% of the vote, followed closely by Lousteau with 48.4%, thus, PRO won the elections for a third term with Larreta as mayor and Diego Santilli as deputy. In these elections, PRO was stronger in wealthier northern Buenos Aires, while ECO was stronger in the southern, poorer neighborhoods of the city. On 5 December 2023, Jorge Macri of PRO was sworn in as new mayor of Buenos Aires City to succeed outgoing Mayor Horacio Rodríguez Larreta of the same party.

== Geography ==
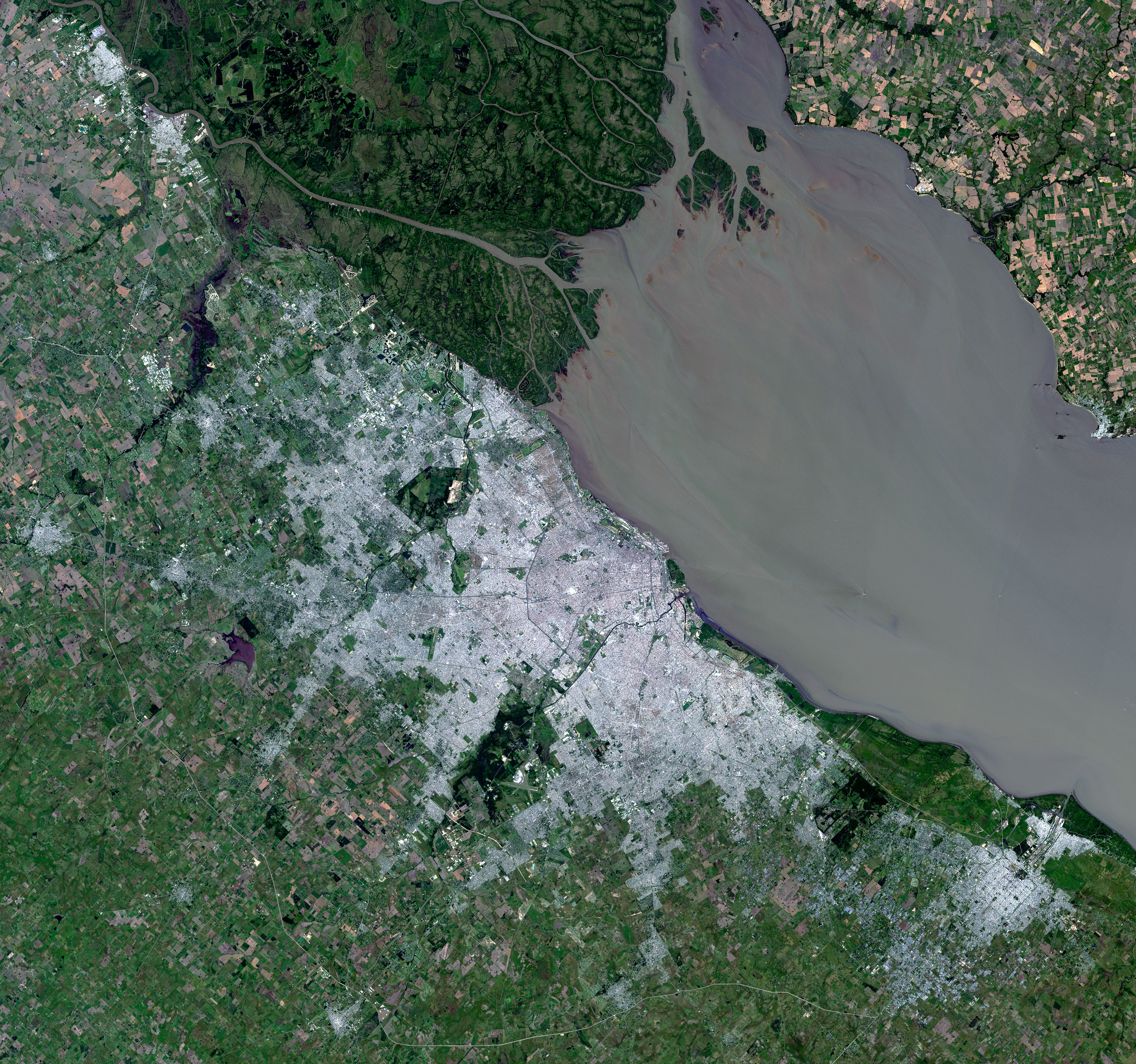
Satellite view of the Greater Buenos Aires area, and the Río de la Plata

The city of Buenos Aires lies in the pampa region, with the exception of some areas such as the Buenos Aires Ecological Reserve, the Boca Juniors' "sports city", Jorge Newbery Airport, the Puerto Madero neighborhood and the main port itself; these were all built on reclaimed land along the coasts of the Rio de la Plata (the world's widest river).

The region was formerly crossed by different streams and lagoons, some of which were refilled, and others tubed. Among the most important streams are the Maldonado, Vega, Medrano, Cildañez, and White. In 1908, as floods were damaging the city's infrastructure, many streams were channeled and rectified; furthermore, starting in 1919, most streams were enclosed. Most notably, the Maldonado was tubed in 1954; it currently runs below Juan B. Justo Avenue.

=== Parks ===
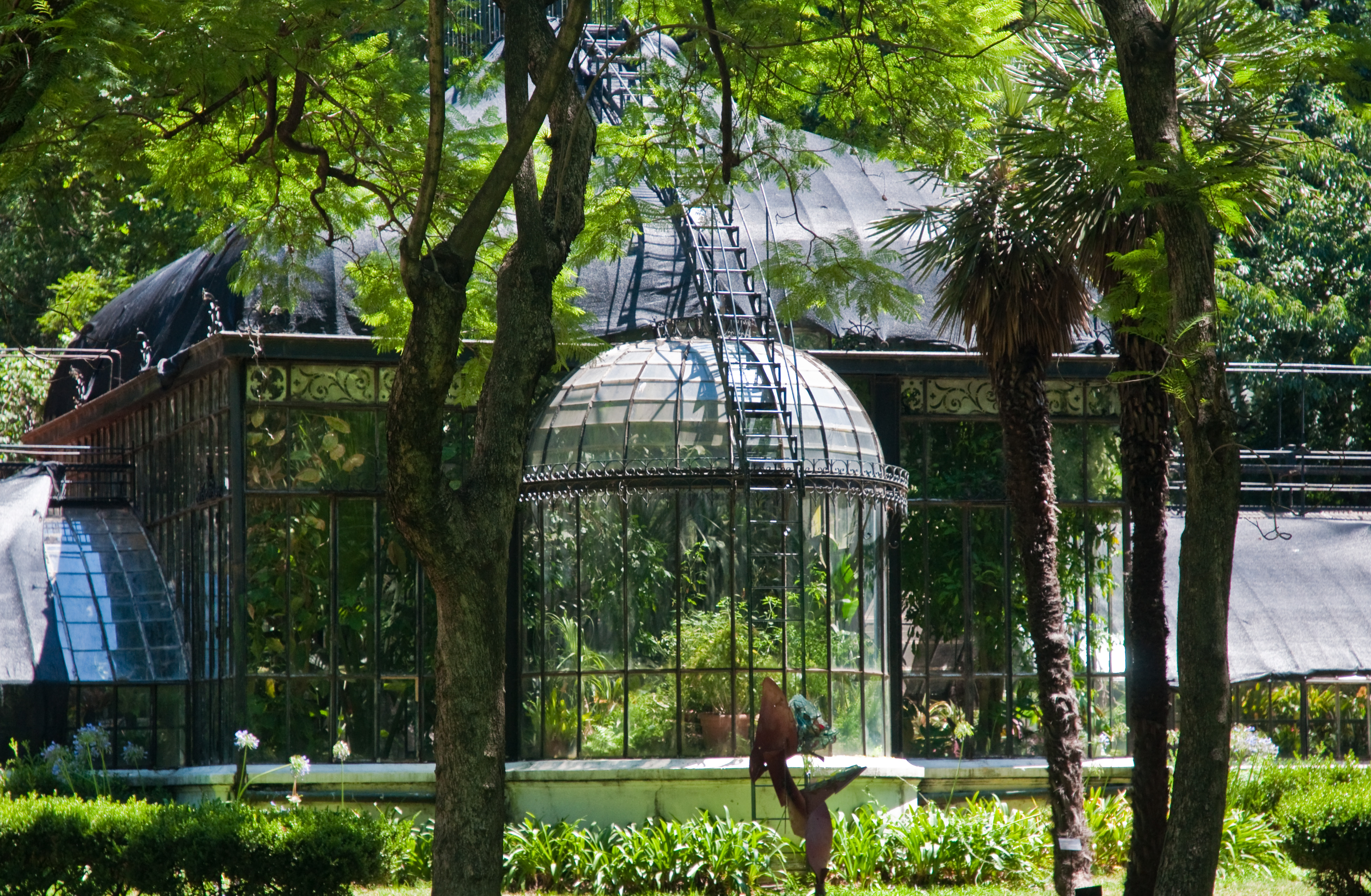
The Buenos Aires Botanical Garden.

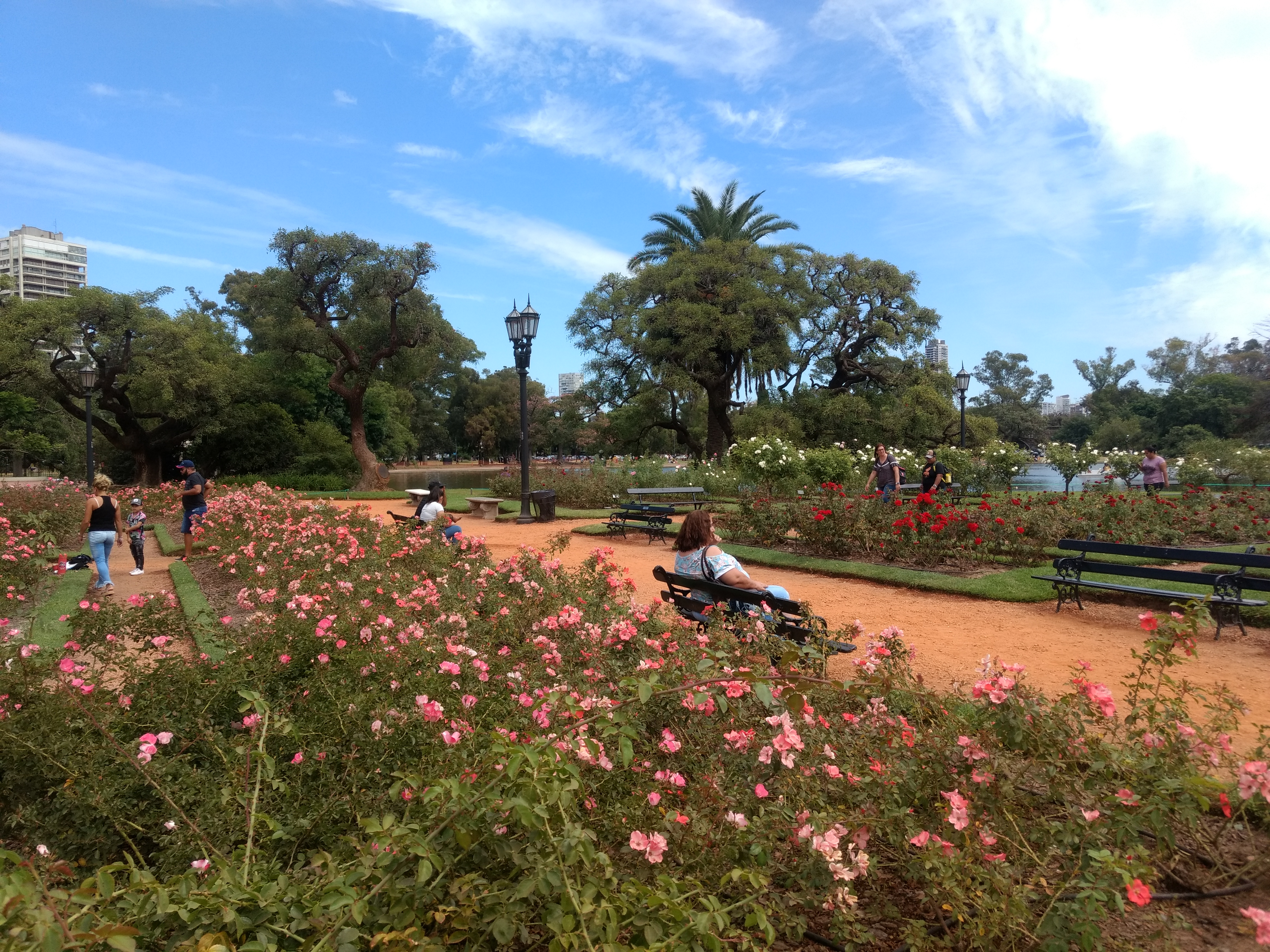
Tres de Febrero Park.

Buenos Aires has over 250 parks and green spaces, the largest concentration of which are on the city's eastern side in the neighborhoods of Puerto Madero, Recoleta, Palermo, and Belgrano. Some of the most important are:

- Parque Tres de Febrero was designed by urbanist Jordán Czeslaw Wysocki and architect Julio Dormal. The park was inaugurated on 11 November 1875. The subsequent dramatic economic growth of Buenos Aires helped to lead to its transfer to the municipal domain in 1888, whereby French Argentine urbanist Carlos Thays was commissioned to expand and further beautify the park, between 1892 and 1912. Thays designed the Zoological Gardens, the Botanical Gardens, the adjoining Plaza Italia and the Rose Garden.
- Botanical Gardens, designed by French architect and landscape designer Carlos Thays, the garden was inaugurated on 7 September 1898. Thays and his family lived in an English style mansion, located within the gardens, between 1892 and 1898, when he served as director of parks and walks in the city. The mansion, built in 1881, is currently the main building of the complex.
- Buenos Aires Japanese Gardens is the largest of its type in the world, outside Japan. Completed in 1967, the gardens were inaugurated on the occasion of a State visit to Argentina by Crown Prince Akihito and Princess Michiko of Japan.
- Plaza de Mayo Since being the scene of May Revolution of 1810 that led to Argentinian independence, the plaza has been a hub of political life in Argentina.
- Plaza San Martín is a park located in the city's neighborhood of Retiro. Situated at the northern end of pedestrianized Florida Street, the park is bounded by Libertador Ave. (N), Maipú St. (W), Santa Fe Avenue (S), and Leandro Alem Av. (E).

=== Climate ===
Under the Köppen climate classification, Buenos Aires has a humid subtropical climate (Cfa). As a result of maritime influences from the adjoining Atlantic Ocean, the climate is temperate with extreme temperatures being rare. Because the city is located in an area where the Pampero and Sudestada winds pass by, the weather is variable due to these contrasting air masses.

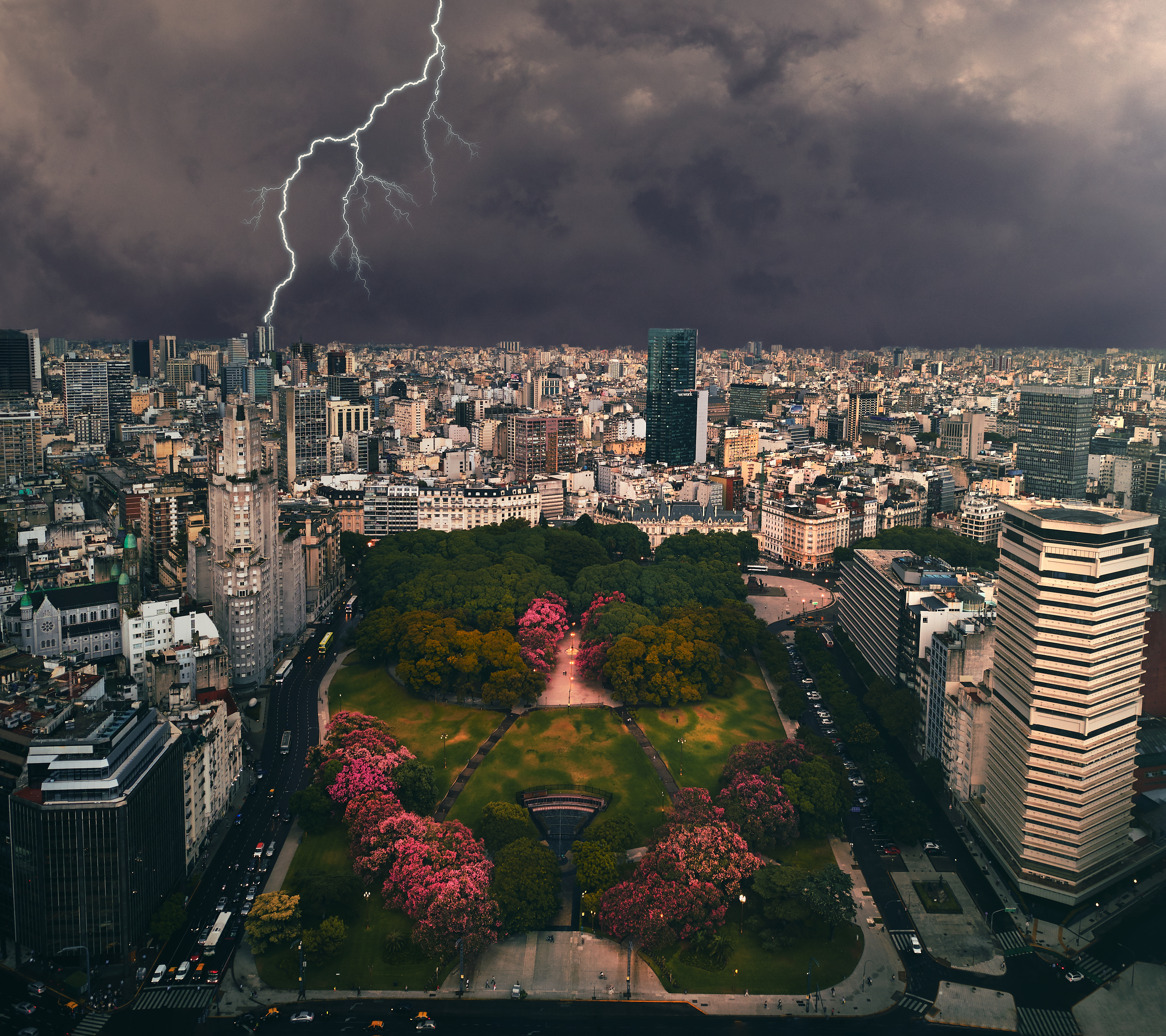
Heavy rain and thunderstorm in Plaza San Martin. Thunderstorms are usual during the summer.

Summers are hot and humid. The warmest month is January, with a daily average of 24.9 °C (76.8 °F). Heat waves are common during summers. However, most heat waves are of short duration (less than a week) and are followed by the passage of the cold, dry Pampero wind which brings violent and intense thunderstorms followed by cooler temperatures. The highest temperature ever recorded was 43.3 °C (110 °F) on 29 January 1957. In January 2022, a heatwave caused power grid failure in parts of Buenos Aires metropolitan area affecting more than 700,000 households.

Winters are rather cool with mild temperatures during the day and chilly nights. Highs during the season average 16.6 °C (61.9 °F) while lows average 8.3 °C (46.9 °F). Relative humidity averages in the upper 70s%, which means the city is noted for moderate-to-heavy fogs during autumn and winter. July is the coolest month, with an average temperature of 11.0 °C (51.8 °F). Cold spells originating from Antarctica occur almost every year, and can persist for several days. Occasionally, warm air masses from the north bring warmer temperatures. The lowest temperature ever recorded in central Buenos Aires (Buenos Aires Central Observatory) was −5.4 °C (22 °F) on 9 July 1918. Snow is very rare in the city: the last snowfall occurred on 9 July 2007 when, during the coldest winter in Argentina in almost 30 years, severe snowfalls and blizzards hit the country. It was the first major snowfall in the city in 89 years.

Spring and autumn are characterized by changeable weather conditions. Cold air from the south can bring cooler temperatures while hot humid air from the north brings hot temperatures.

The city receives 1,257.6 mm (50 in) of precipitation per year. Because of its geomorphology along with an inadequate drainage network, the city is highly vulnerable to flooding during periods of heavy rainfall.

Climate data for Buenos Aires Central Observatory, located in Agronomía (1991–2020, extremes 1906–present)
Month	Jan	Feb	Mar	Apr	May	Jun	Jul	Aug	Sep	Oct	Nov	Dec	Year
Record high °C (°F)	43.3 (109.9)	38.0 (100.4)	38.9 (102.0)	36.0 (96.8)	31.6 (88.9)	28.5 (83.3)	30.2 (86.4)	34.4 (93.9)	35.3 (95.5)	36.3 (97.3)	36.8 (98.2)	40.5 (104.9)	43.3 (109.9)
Mean daily maximum °C (°F)	30.1 (86.2)	28.9 (84.0)	27.0 (80.6)	23.2 (73.8)	19.4 (66.9)	16.4 (61.5)	15.5 (59.9)	17.9 (64.2)	19.7 (67.5)	22.6 (72.7)	26.0 (78.8)	29.0 (84.2)	22.9 (73.2)
Daily mean °C (°F)	24.9 (76.8)	23.8 (74.8)	22.0 (71.6)	18.2 (64.8)	14.8 (58.6)	12.0 (53.6)	11.0 (51.8)	13.0 (55.4)	14.9 (58.8)	17.9 (64.2)	20.9 (69.6)	23.6 (74.5)	18.1 (64.6)
Mean daily minimum °C (°F)	20.2 (68.4)	19.4 (66.9)	17.7 (63.9)	14.1 (57.4)	11.1 (52.0)	8.4 (47.1)	7.5 (45.5)	8.9 (48.0)	10.6 (51.1)	13.4 (56.1)	16.1 (61.0)	18.5 (65.3)	13.8 (56.8)
Record low °C (°F)	5.9 (42.6)	4.2 (39.6)	2.8 (37.0)	−2.3 (27.9)	−4.0 (24.8)	−5.3 (22.5)	−5.4 (22.3)	−4.0 (24.8)	−2.4 (27.7)	−2.0 (28.4)	1.6 (34.9)	3.7 (38.7)	−5.4 (22.3)
Average precipitation mm (inches)	134.4 (5.29)	129.3 (5.09)	120.0 (4.72)	130.3 (5.13)	93.5 (3.68)	61.5 (2.42)	74.4 (2.93)	70.3 (2.77)	80.6 (3.17)	122.9 (4.84)	117.6 (4.63)	122.8 (4.83)	1,257.6 (49.51)
Average precipitation days (≥ 0.1 mm)	8.9	8.0	8.2	8.9	7.2	7.3	7.4	7.0	7.4	10.2	8.9	8.9	98.3
Average relative humidity (%)	64.6	69.1	72.0	75.6	78.7	78.2	77.0	72.6	69.5	69.4	65.3	62.8	71.2
Mean monthly sunshine hours	272.8	223.2	217.0	168.0	158.1	135.0	142.6	170.5	180.0	204.6	246.0	266.6	2,384.4
Mean daily sunshine hours	8.8	7.9	7.0	5.6	5.1	4.5	4.6	5.5	6.0	6.6	8.2	8.6	6.5
Average ultraviolet index	12	11	8	5	3	2	2	3	5	8	10	12	7
Source: Servicio Meteorológico Nacional (UV 1995-2002 ; 2005-2019)

== Government and politics ==
=== Government structure ===
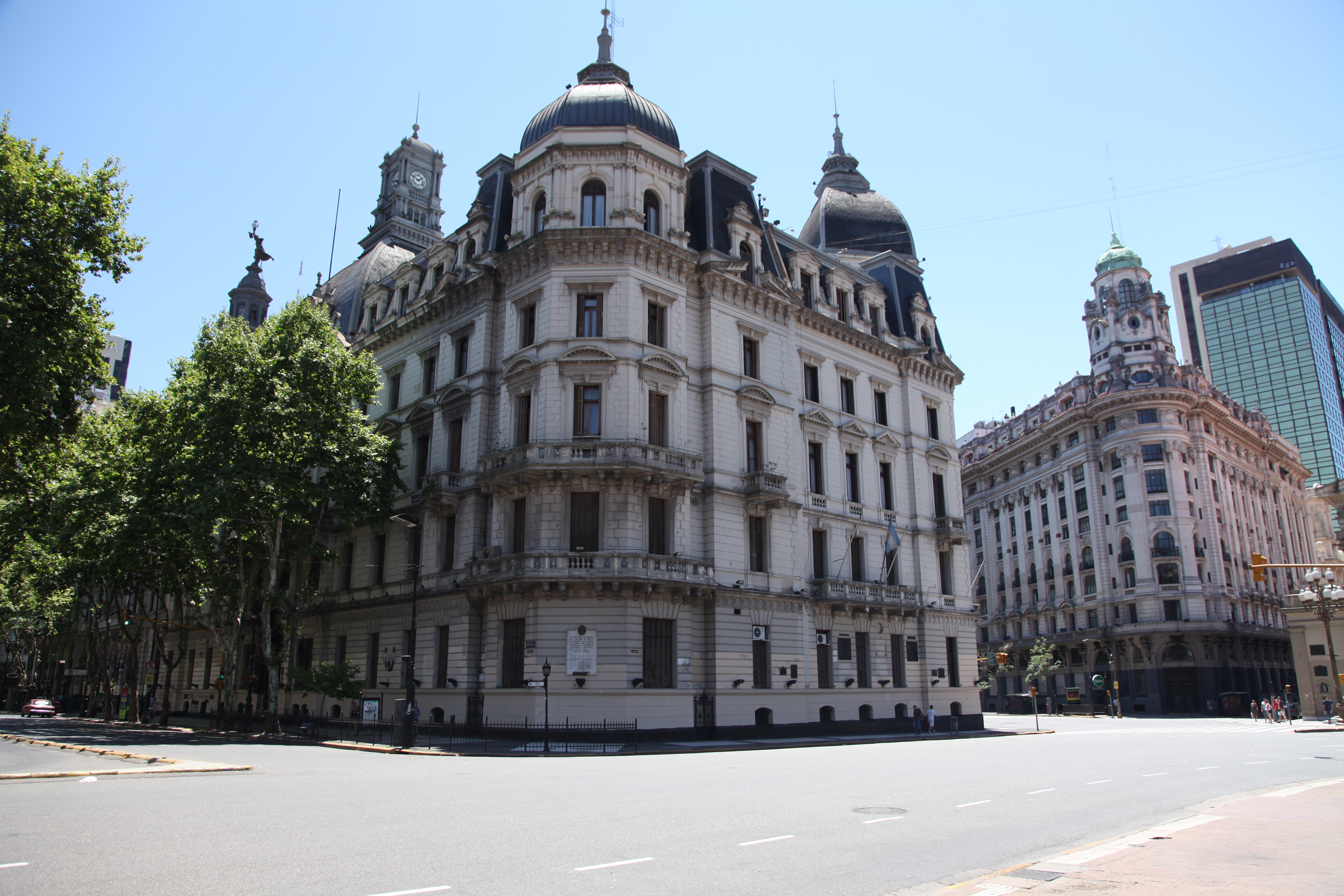
The former Buenos Aires City Hall in the right corner of the entrance to the Avenida de Mayo.

Since the adoption of the city's Constitution in 1996, Buenos Aires has had a democratically elected executive; Article 61 of the Constitution of the states that "Suffrage is free, equal, secret, universal, compulsory and non-accumulative. Resident aliens enjoy this same right, with its corresponding obligations, on equal terms with Argentine citizens registered in the district, under the terms established by law." The executive power is vested on the Chief of Government (Spanish: Jefe de Gobierno), who is elected alongside a Deputy Chief of Government. In analogous fashion to the Vice President of Argentina, the Deputy Chief of Government presides over the city's legislative body, the City Legislature.

The Chief of Government and the Legislature are both elected for four-year terms; half of the Legislature's members are renewed every two years. Elections use the D'Hondt method of proportional representation. The judicial branch comprises the Supreme Court of Justice (Tribunal Superior de Justicia), the Council of Magistracy (Consejo de la Magistratura), the Public Ministry, and other city courts.

Legally, the city has less autonomy than the Provinces. In June 1996, shortly before the city's first Executive elections were held, the Argentine National Congress issued the National Law 24.588 (known as Ley Cafiero, after the Senator who advanced the project) by which the authority over the 25,000-strong Argentine Federal Police and the responsibility over the federal institutions residing at the city (e.g., National Supreme Court of Justice buildings) would not be transferred from the National Government to the Autonomous City Government until a new consensus could be reached at the National Congress. Furthermore, it declared that the Port of Buenos Aires, along with some other places, would remain under constituted federal authorities.

Beginning in 2007, the city has embarked on a new decentralization scheme, creating new Communes (comunas) which are to be managed by elected committees of seven members each. Buenos Aires is represented in the Argentine Senate by three senators (as of 2017, Martín Lousteau, Mariano Recalde and Guadalupe Tagliaferri). The people of Buenos Aires also elect 25 national deputies to the Argentine Chamber of Deputies.

=== Law enforcement ===
The Guardia Urbana de Buenos Aires (Buenos Aires Urban Guard) was a specialized civilian force of the city of Buenos Aires, Argentina, that used to deal with different urban conflicts with the objective of developing actions of prevention, dissuasion and mediation, promoting effective behaviors that guarantee the security and the integrity of public order and social coexistence. The unit continuously assisted the personnel of the Argentine Federal Police, especially in emergency situations, events of massive concurrence, and protection of tourist establishments. Urban Guard officials did not carry any weapons in the performing of their duties. Their basic tools were a HT radio transmitter and a whistle. As of March 2008, the Guardia Urbana was removed.

The Buenos Aires Metropolitan Police was the police force under the authority of the Autonomous City of Buenos Aires. The force was created in 2010 and was composed of 1,850 officers. In 2016, the Buenos Aires Metropolitan Police and part of the Argentine Federal Police were merged to create the new Buenos Aires City Police force. The Buenos Aires City Police force began operations on 1 January 2017. Security in the city is now the responsibility of the Buenos Aires City Police. The police is headed by the Chief of Police who is appointed by the head of the executive branch of the city of Buenos Aires. Geographically, the force is divided into 56 stations throughout the city. All police station employees are civilians. The Buenos Aires City Police force is composed of over 25,000 officers.

== Demographics ==
Buenos Aires city population pyramid as of June 2026

Historical population
Year	Pop.	±%
1869	187,126	—
1895	663,854	+254.8%
1914	1,575,814	+137.4%
1947	2,982,580	+89.3%
1960	2,966,634	−0.5%
1970	2,972,453	+0.2%
1980	2,922,829	−1.7%
1991	2,965,403	+1.5%
2001	2,776,138	−6.4%
2010	2,890,151	+4.1%
2022	3,121,707	+8.0%
Source: INDEC

In the census of 2010, there were 2,891,082 people residing in the city. The population of Greater Buenos Aires was 13,147,638 according to 2010 census data. The population density in Buenos Aires proper was 13,680 inhabitants per square kilometer (35,400 inhabitants/sq mi), but only about 2,400 inhabitants per square kilometre (6,200 inhabitants/sq mi) in the suburbs.

Buenos Aires' population has hovered around 3 million since 1947, due to low birth rates and a slow migration to the suburbs. However, the surrounding districts have expanded over fivefold (to around 10 million) since then.

The 2001 census showed a relatively aged population: with 17% under the age of fifteen and 22% over sixty, the people of Buenos Aires have an age structure similar to those in most European cities. They are older than Argentines as a whole (of whom 28% were under 15, and 14% over 60).

Two-thirds of the city's residents live in apartment buildings and 30% in single-family homes; 4% live in sub-standard housing. Measured in terms of income, the city's poverty rate was 8.4% in 2007 and, including the metro area, 20.6%. Other studies estimate that 4 million people in the metropolitan Buenos Aires area live in poverty.

The city's resident labor force of 1.2 million in 2001 was mostly employed in the services sector, particularly social services (25%), commerce and tourism (20%) and business and financial services (17%); despite the city's role as Argentina's capital, public administration employed only 6%. Manufacturing still employed 10%.

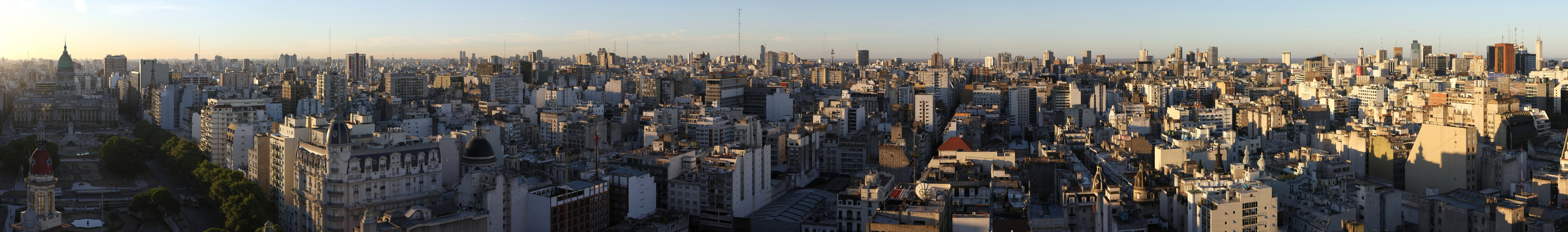
Panorama of downtown. On the left is the Congressional Plaza and the river and skyscrapers are far in the back of the panorama.

=== Districts ===
The city is divided into barrios (neighborhoods) for administrative purposes, a division originally based on Catholic parroquias (parishes). A common expression is that of the Cien barrios porteños ("One hundred porteño neighborhoods"), referring to a composition made popular in the 1940s by tango singer Alberto Castillo; however, Buenos Aires only consists of 48 official barrios. There are several subdivisions of these districts, some with a long history and others that are the product of a real estate invention. A notable example is Palermo – the city's largest district – which has been subdivided into various barrios, including Palermo Soho, Palermo Hollywood, Las Cañitas and Palermo viejo, among others. A newer scheme has divided the city into 15 comunas (communes).

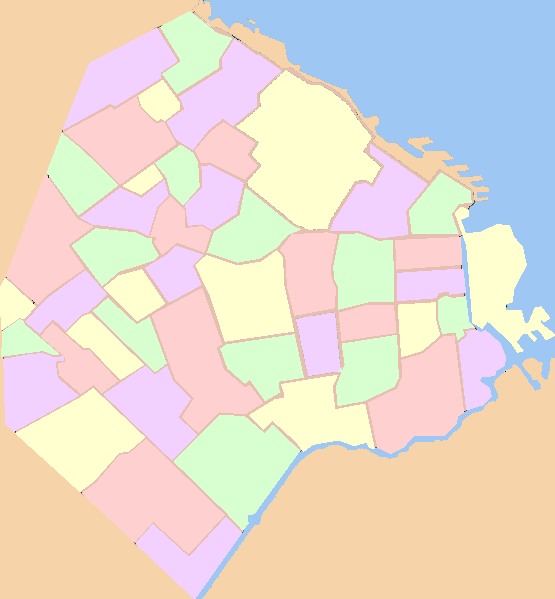

=== Population origin ===
Foreign population

As of June 2026, one in five residents of the city is foreign-born

The majority of porteños have European origins, mostly from the Andalusian, Galician, Asturian, and Basque regions of Spain, as well as the Italian regions of Calabria, Liguria, Piedmont, Lombardy, Sicily and Campania. Unrestricted waves of European immigrants to Argentina starting in the mid-19th century significantly increased the country's population, even causing the number of porteños to triple between 1887 and 1915 from 500,000 to 1.5 million.

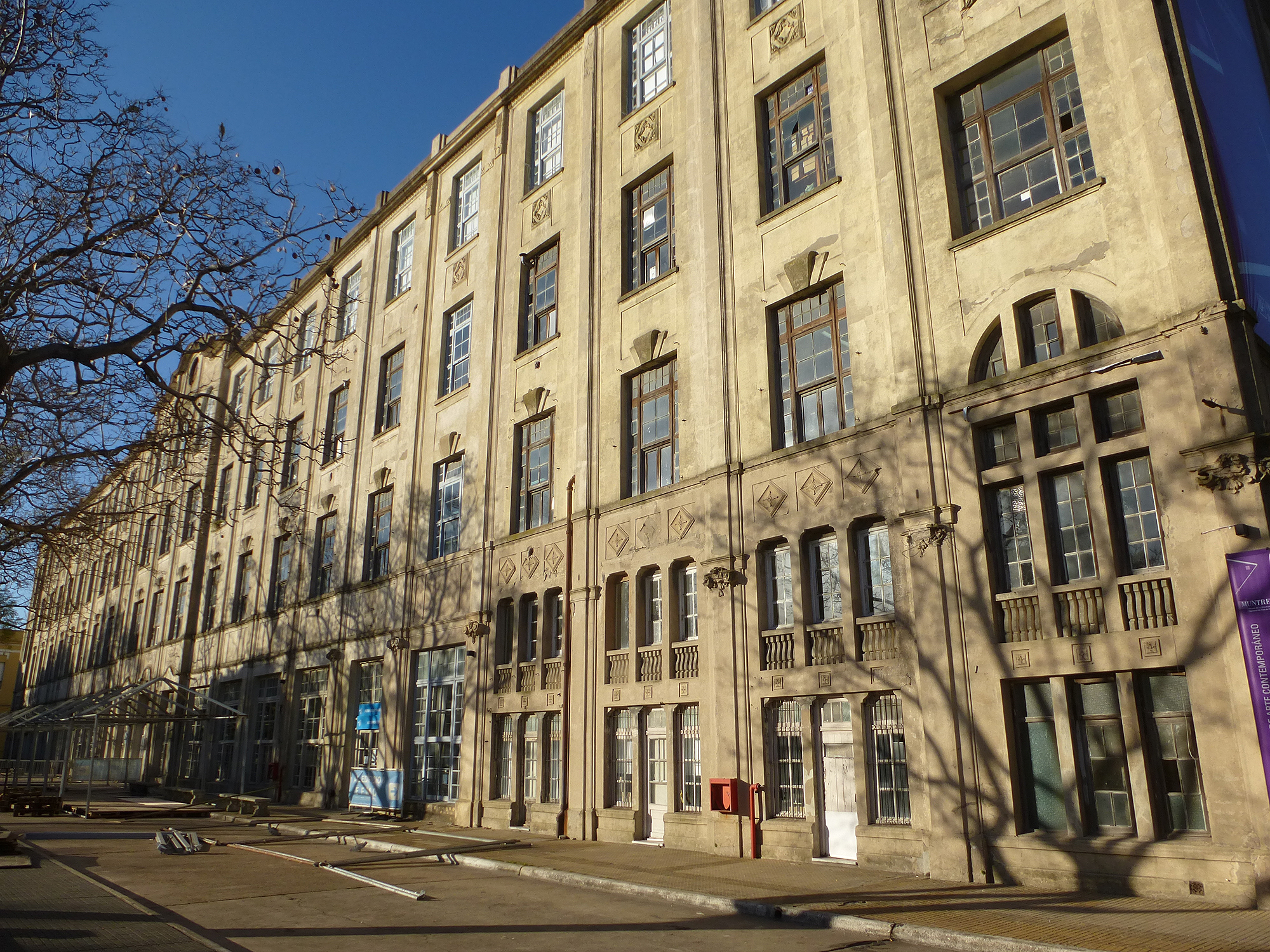
The Immigrants' Hotel, constructed in 1906, received and assisted the thousands of immigrants arriving to the city. The hotel is now a National Museum.

Other significant European origins include French, Portuguese, German, Irish, Norwegian, Polish, Swedish, Greek, Czech, Albanian, Croatian, Slovenian, Dutch, Russian, Serbian, English, Scottish, Slovak, Hungarian and Bulgarian. In the 1980s and 1990s, there was a small wave of immigration from Romania and Ukraine.

The Jewish community in Greater Buenos Aires numbers around 250,000 and is the largest in the country. The city is also eighth largest in the world in terms of Jewish population. Most are of Northern, Western, Central, and Eastern European Ashkenazi origin, primarily Swedish, Dutch, Polish, German, and Russian Jews, with a significant Sephardic minority, mostly made up of Syrian Jews and Lebanese Jews.

Most East Asian immigration in Buenos Aires comes from China. Chinese immigration is the fourth largest in Argentina, with the vast majority of them living in Buenos Aires and its metropolitan area. In the 1980s, most of them were from Taiwan, but since the 1990s the majority of Chinese immigrants come from the mainland Chinese province of Fukien (Fujian). The mainland Chinese who came from Fukien mainly installed supermarkets throughout the city and the suburbs; these supermarkets are so common that, in average, there is one every two and a half blocks and are simply referred to as el chino ("the Chinese"). Japanese immigrants are mostly from the Okinawa Prefecture. They started the dry cleaning business in Argentina, an activity that is considered idiosyncratic to them. Korean Immigration occurred after the division of Korea; they mainly settled in Flores and Once.

In the 2010 census [INDEC], 2.1% of the population or 61,876 persons declared to be Indigenous or first-generation descendants of Indigenous people in Buenos Aires (not including the 24 adjacent Partidos that make up Greater Buenos Aires). Amongst the 61,876 persons who are of indigenous origin, 15.9% are Quechua people, 15.9% are Guaraní, 15.5% are Aymara and 11% are Mapuche. Within the 24 adjacent Partidos, 186,640 persons or 1.9% of the total population declared themselves to be Indigenous. Amongst the 186,640 persons who are of indigenous origin, 21.2% are Guaraní, 19% are Toba, 11.3% are Mapuche, 10.5% are Quechua and 7.6% are Diaguita.

In the city, 15,764 people identified themselves as Afro-Argentine in the 2010 Census.

=== Urban problems ===
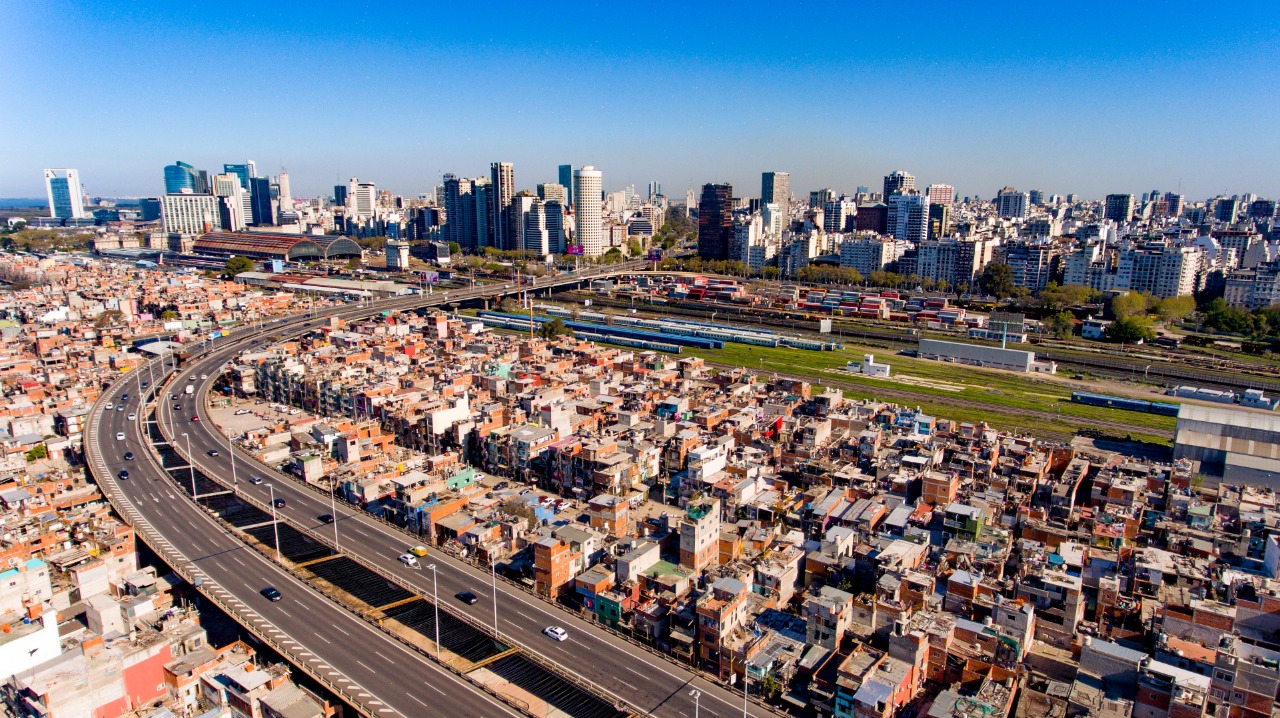
Villa 31, a villa miseria in Buenos Aires

Villas miseria are a type of slum whose size ranges from small groups of precarious houses to large communities with thousands of residents. In slums on the outskirts, there was an escalation in crime during early 2024, mainly robbery-related murders.

Buenos Aires has below 2 m^{2} (22 sq ft) of green space per person, which is 90% less than New York, 85% less than Madrid and 80% less than Paris. The World Health Organization (WHO), in its concern for public health, produced a document stating that every city should have a minimum of 9 m^{2} (97 sq ft) of green space per person; an optimal amount of space per person would range from 10 to 15 m^{2} (161 sq ft). Despite the low per-capita figure, the city is often experienced as relatively green at the neighborhood level, since vegetation is spread across many small plazas and tree-lined streets, providing regular visual greenery and shade that makes walking more comfortable.

=== Language ===
Buenos Aires' dialect of Spanish, which is known as Rioplatense Spanish, is distinguished by its use of voseo, yeísmo, and aspiration of s in various contexts. It is heavily influenced by the dialects of Spanish spoken in Andalusia and Murcia and shares its features with that of other cities like Rosario and Montevideo, Uruguay. In the early 20th century, Argentina absorbed millions of immigrants, many of them Italians, who spoke mostly in their local dialects (mainly Neapolitan, Sicilian and Genoese). Their adoption of Spanish was gradual, creating a pidgin of Italian dialects and Spanish that was called cocoliche. Its usage declined around the 1950s. A phonetic study conducted by the Laboratory for Sensory Investigations of CONICET and the University of Toronto showed that the prosody of porteño is closer to the Neapolitan language of Italy than to any other spoken language. Many Spanish immigrants were from Galicia, and Spaniards are still generically referred to in Argentina as gallegos (Galicians). Galician language, cuisine and culture had a major presence in the city for most of the 20th century. In recent years, descendants of Galician immigrants have led a small boom in Celtic music (which also highlighted the Welsh traditions of Patagonia). Yiddish was commonly heard in Buenos Aires, especially in the Balvanera garment district and in Villa Crespo until the 1960s. Most of the newer immigrants learn Spanish quickly and assimilate into city life.

The Lunfardo argot originated within the prison population, and in time spread to all porteños. Lunfardo uses words from Italian dialects, from Brazilian Portuguese, from African and Caribbean languages and even from English. Lunfardo employs humorous tricks such as inverting the syllables within a word (vesre). Today, Lunfardo is mostly heard in tango lyrics; the slang of the younger generations has been evolving away from it. Buenos Aires was also the first city to host a Mundo Lingo event on 7 July 2011, which have been after replicated in up to 15 cities in 13 countries.

=== Religion ===
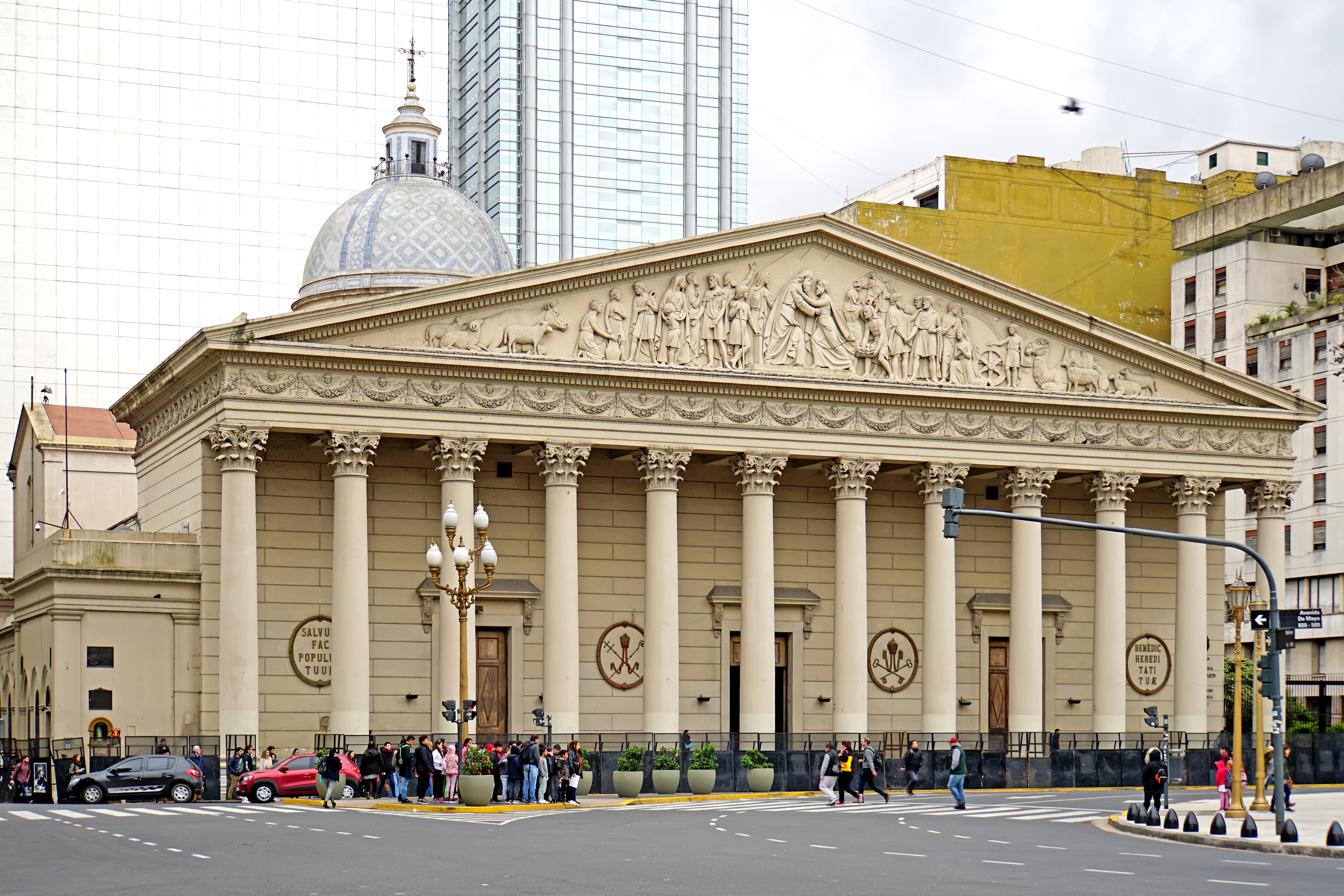
The Metropolitan Cathedral of the Most Holy Trinity is the main Catholic church in the city.

At the beginning of the twentieth century, Buenos Aires was the second-largest Catholic city in the world, after Paris. Christianity is still the most prevalently practiced religion in Buenos Aires (~71.4%), a 2019 CONICET survey on religious beliefs and attitudes found that the inhabitants of the Buenos Aires Metropolitan Area (Área Metropolitana de Buenos Aires, AMBA) were 56.4% Catholic, 26.2% non-religious, and 15% Evangelical, making it the region of the country with the highest proportion of irreligious people. A previous CONICET survey from 2008 had found that 69.1% were Catholic, 18% "indifferent", 9.1% Evangelical, 1.4% Jehovah's Witnesses or Mormons, and 2.3% adherents to other religions. The comparison between both surveys reveals that the Buenos Aires Metropolitan Area is the region in which the decline of Catholicism was most pronounced during the last decade.

Buenos Aires is also home to the largest Jewish community in Latin America, and the second largest in the Western Hemisphere, after the United States. The Jewish community of Buenos Aires has historically been characterized by its high level of organization and influence in the cultural history of the city.

Buenos Aires is the seat of a Catholic metropolitan archbishop (the Catholic primate of Argentina), currently Archbishop Mario Poli. His predecessor, Cardinal Jorge Bergoglio, was elected to the papacy as Pope Francis in 2013. There are Protestant, Eastern Orthodox, Eastern Catholic, Buddhist, and various other religious minorities as well.

=== Education ===
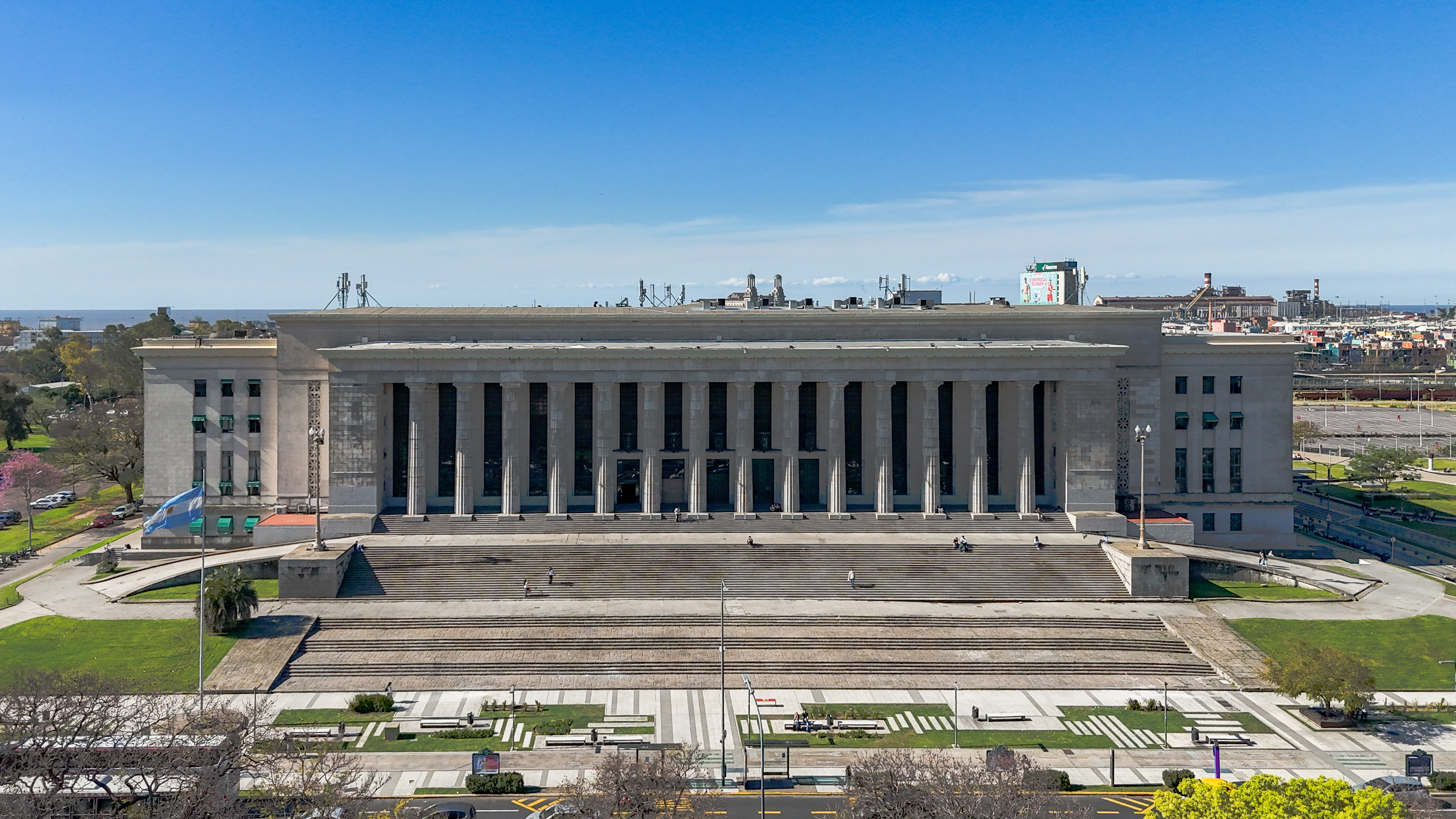
University of Buenos Aires' Faculty of Law

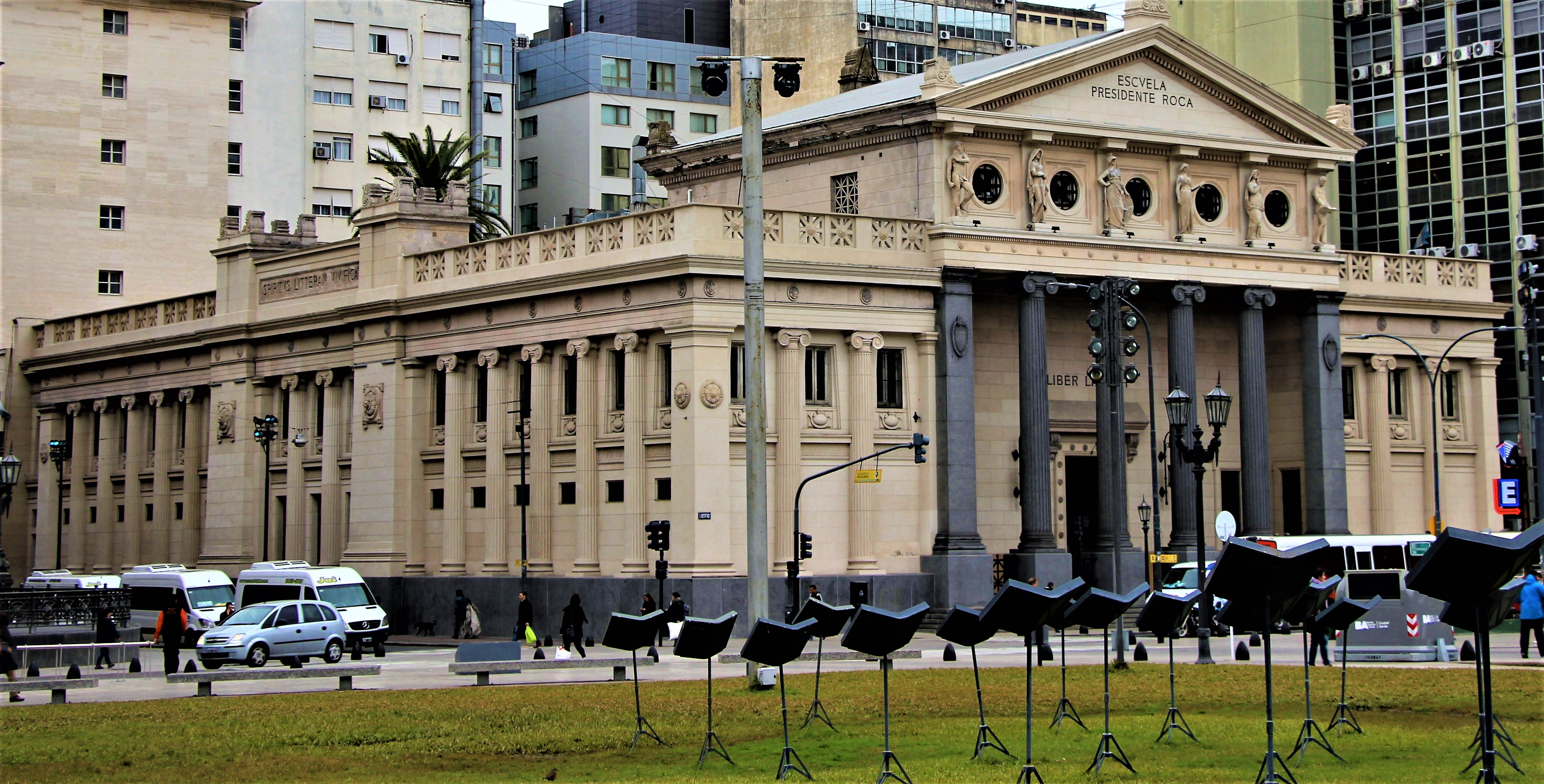
President Roca School.

Primary education comprises grades 1–7. Most primary schools in the city still adhere to the traditional seven-year primary school, but kids can do grades 1–6 if their high school lasts 6 years, such as ORT Argentina. Secondary education in Argentina is called Polimodal (having multiple modes) since it allows the student to choose their orientation. Polimodal is usually 3 years of schooling, although some schools have a fourth year. Before entering the first year of polimodal, students choose an orientation from among five specializations. Some high schools depend on the University of Buenos Aires, and these require an admission course when students are taking the last year of high school. These high schools are ILSE, CNBA, Escuela Superior de Comercio Carlos Pellegrini and Escuela de Educación Técnica Profesional en Producción Agropecuaria y Agroalimentaria (School of Professional Technique Education in Agricultural and Agrifood Production). The last two do have a specific orientation. In December 2006 the Chamber of Deputies of the Argentine Congress passed a new National Education Law restoring the old system of primary followed by secondary education, making secondary education obligatory and a right, and increasing the length of compulsory education to 13 years. The government vowed to put the law in effect gradually, starting in 2007.

There are many public universities in Argentina, as well as a number of private universities. The University of Buenos Aires, one of the top learning institutions in South America, has produced five Nobel Prize winners and provides taxpayer-funded education for students from all around the globe. Buenos Aires is a major center for psychoanalysis, particularly the Lacanian school. Buenos Aires is home to several private universities of different quality, such as: Universidad Argentina de la Empresa, Buenos Aires Institute of Technology, CEMA University, Favaloro University, Pontifical Catholic University of Argentina, University of Belgrano, University of Palermo, University of Salvador, Universidad Abierta Interamericana, Universidad Argentina John F. Kennedy, Universidad de Ciencias Empresariales y Sociales, Universidad del Museo Social Argentino, Universidad Austral, Universidad CAECE and Torcuato di Tella University.

In April 2024, thousands of protesters, including professors and students, gathered on the streets of Buenos Aires and other cities to demand President Javier Milei increased funding for higher education.

== Economy ==
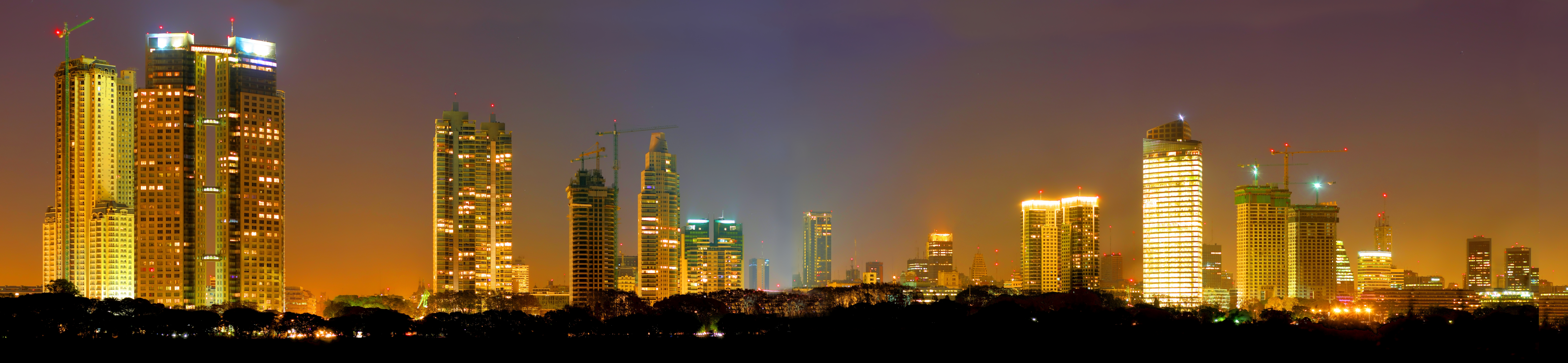
Puerto Madero, in the Buenos Aires Central Business District, currently represents the largest urban renewal project in the city of Buenos Aires. Having undergone an impressive revival in merely a decade, it is one of the most successful recent waterfront renewal projects in the world.

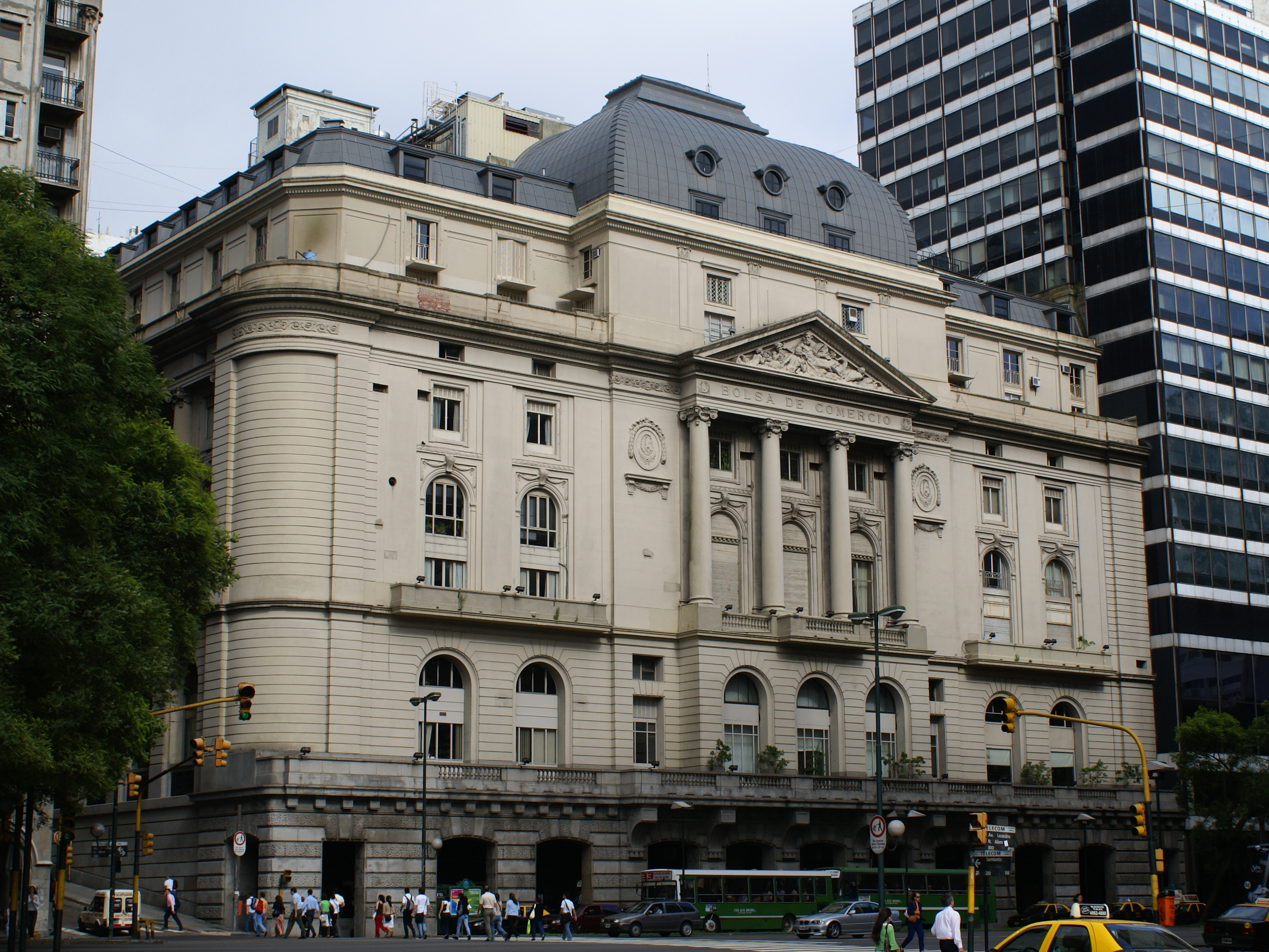
The Buenos Aires Stock Exchange, the main stock exchange and financial center of Argentina

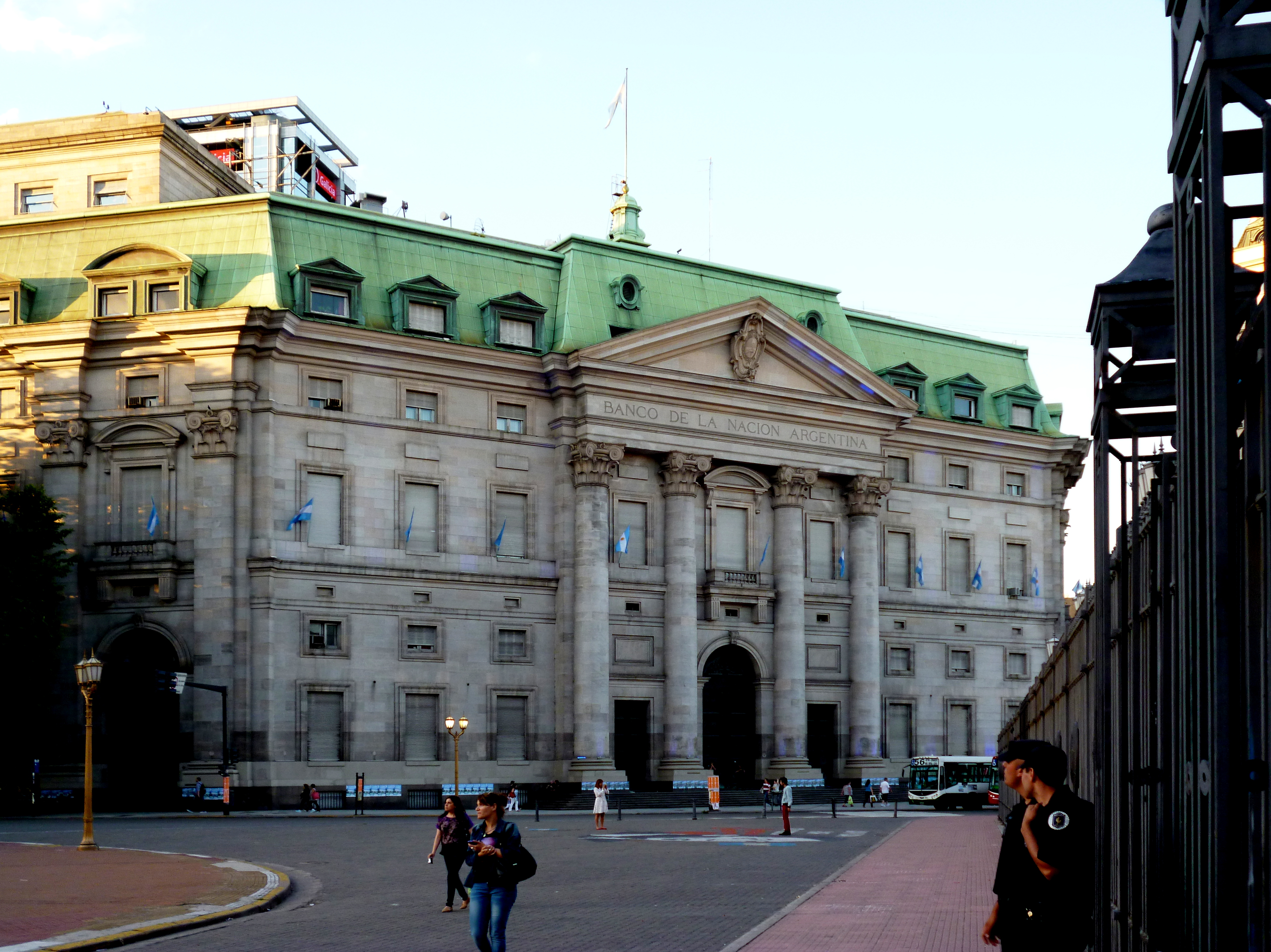
Headquarters of the National Bank of Argentina, the national bank and the largest in the country's banking sector

Buenos Aires is the financial, industrial, and commercial hub of Argentina. The economy in the city proper alone, measured by gross geographic product (adjusted for purchasing power), totaled US$102.7 billion (US$34,200 per capita) in 2020 and amounts to nearly a quarter of Argentina's as a whole. Metro Buenos Aires, according to one well-quoted study, constitutes the 13th largest economy among the world's cities in 2005. The Buenos Aires Human Development Index (0.889 in 2019) is likewise high by international standards.

The city's services sector is diversified and well-developed by international standards, and accounts for 76 percent of its economy (compared to 59% for all of Argentina's). Advertising, in particular, plays a prominent role in the export of services at home and abroad. However, the financial and real estate services sector is the largest and contributes to 31 percent of the city's economy. Finance (about a third of this) in Buenos Aires is especially important to Argentina's banking system, accounting for nearly half the nation's bank deposits and lending. Nearly 300 hotels and another 300 hostels and bed & breakfasts are licensed for tourism, and nearly half the rooms available were in four-star establishments or higher.

Manufacturing is, nevertheless, still prominent in the city's economy (16 percent) and, concentrated mainly in the southern part of the city. It benefits as much from high local purchasing power and a large local supply of skilled labor as it does from its relationship to massive agriculture and industry just outside the city limits. Construction activity in Buenos Aires has historically been among the most accurate indicators of national economic fortunes, and since 2006 around 3 million square meters (32×10^{6} ft^{2}) of construction has been authorized annually. Meat, dairy, grain, tobacco, wool and leather products are processed or manufactured in the Buenos Aires metro area. Other leading industries are automobile manufacturing, oil refining, metalworking, machine-building, and the production of textiles, chemicals, clothing and beverages.

The city's budget, per Mayor Macri's 2011 proposal, included US$6 billion in revenues and US$6.3 billion in expenditures. The city relies on local income and capital gains taxes for 61 percent of its revenues, while federal revenue sharing contributes 11 percent, property taxes, 9 percent, and vehicle taxes, 6 percent. Other revenues include user fees, fines, and gambling duties. The city devotes 26 percent of its budget to education, 22 percent for health, 17 percent for public services and infrastructure, 16 percent for social welfare and culture, 12 percent in administrative costs and 4 percent for law enforcement. Buenos Aires maintains low debt levels and its service requires less than 3 percent of the budget.

=== Tourism ===
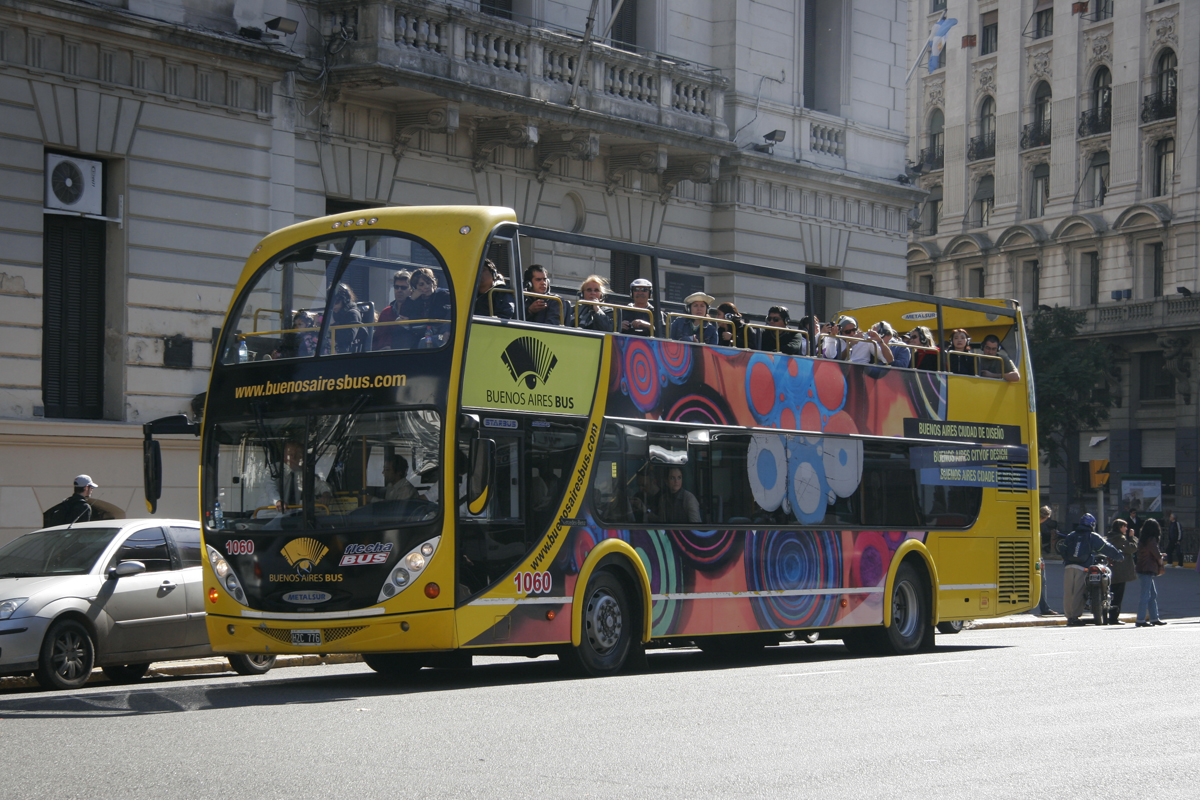
Buenos Aires Bus, the city's tour bus service. The official estimate is that the bus carries between 700 and 800 passengers per day.

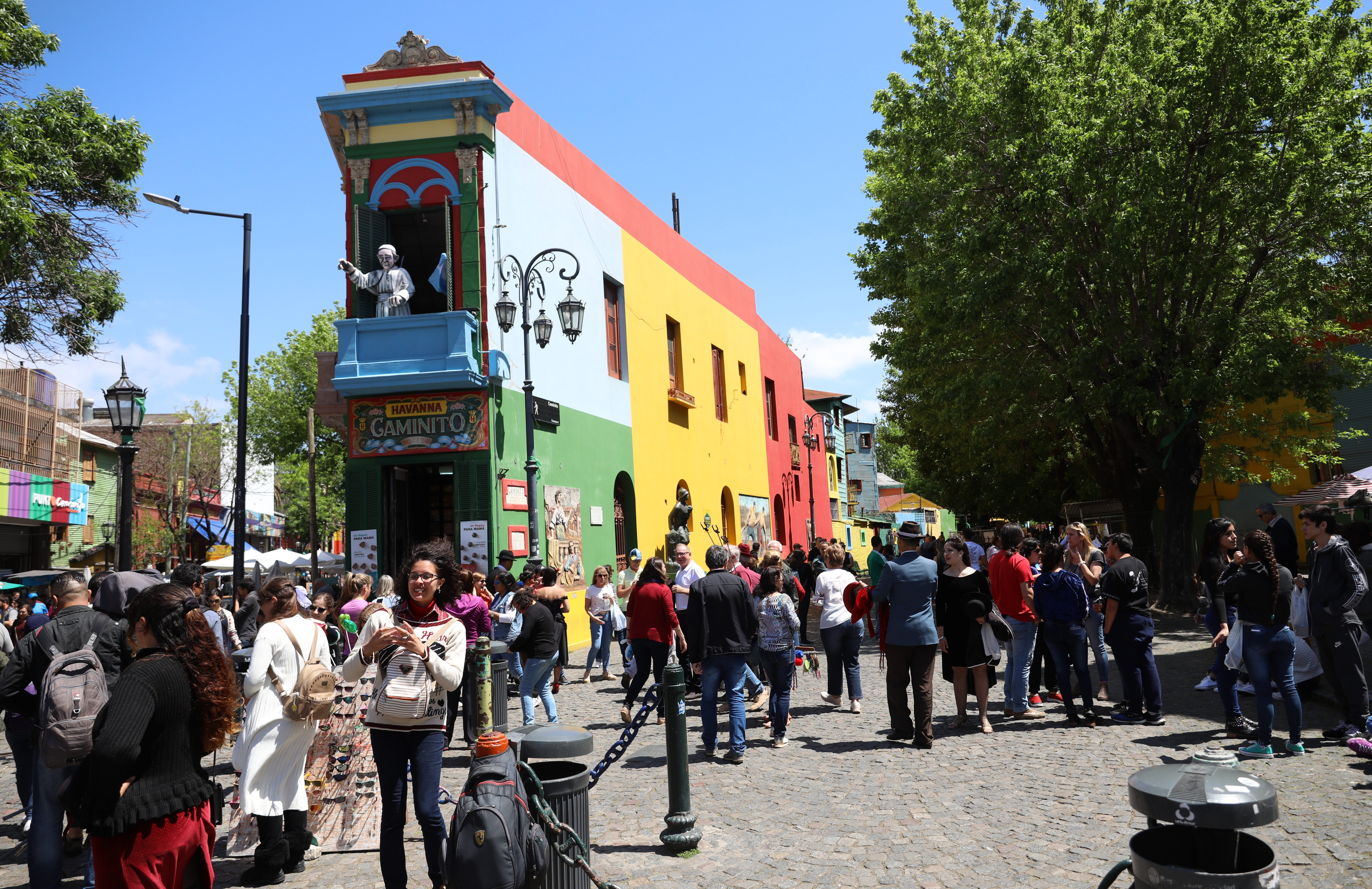
Tourists visiting Caminito in La Boca of Genoese Origin.

According to the World Travel & Tourism Council, tourism has been growing in the Argentine capital since 2002. In a survey by the travel and tourism publication Travel + Leisure Magazine in 2008, visitors voted Buenos Aires the second most desirable city to visit after Florence, Italy. In 2008, an estimated 2.5 million visitors visited the city. Buenos Aires is an international hub of highly active and diverse nightlife with bars, dance bars and nightclubs staying open well past midnight.

Visitors have many options for travel such as going to a tango show, an estancia in the Province of Buenos Aires or enjoying the traditional asado. New tourist circuits have recently evolved, devoted to Argentines such as Carlos Gardel, Eva Perón or Jorge Luis Borges. Before 2011, due to the Argentine peso's favorable exchange rate, its shopping centers such as Alto Palermo, Paseo Alcorta, Patio Bullrich, Abasto de Buenos Aires and Galerías Pacífico were frequently visited by tourists. Nowadays, the exchange rate has hampered tourism and shopping in particular. In fact, notable consumer brands such as Burberry and Louis Vuitton have abandoned the country due to the exchange rate and import restrictions. The city also plays host to musical festivals, some of the largest of which are Quilmes Rock, Creamfields BA, Ultra Music Festival (Buenos Aires), and the Buenos Aires Jazz Festival.

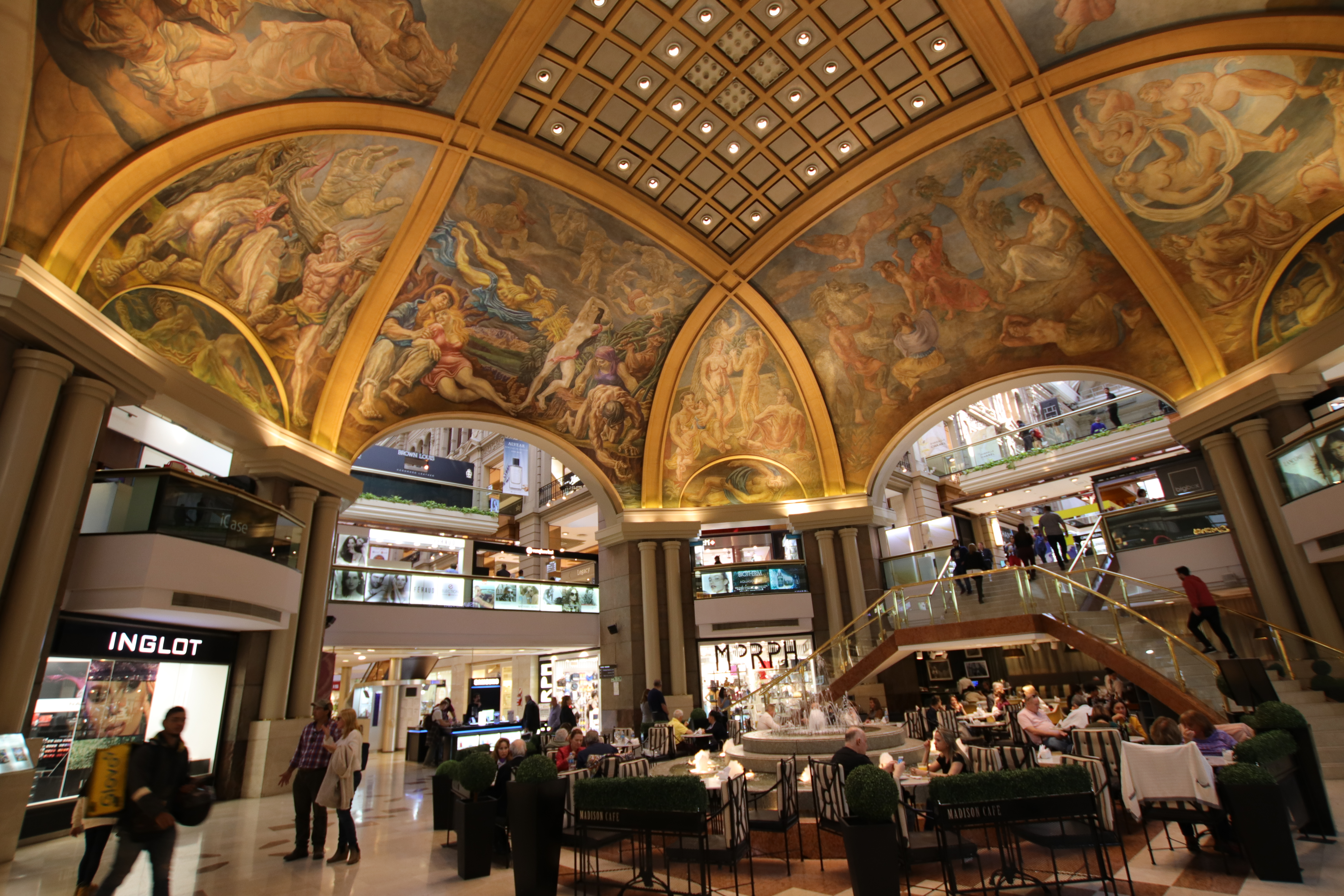
Galerías Pacífico is a shopping centre located at the intersection of Florida Street and Córdoba Avenue.

The most popular tourist sites are found in the historic core of the city, specifically, in the Montserrat and San Telmo neighborhoods. Buenos Aires was conceived around the Plaza de Mayo, the colony's administrative center. To the east of the square is the Casa Rosada, the official seat of the executive branch of the government of Argentina. To the north, the Catedral Metropolitana which has stood in the same location since colonial times, and the Banco de la Nación Argentina building, a parcel of land originally owned by Juan de Garay. Other important colonial institutions were Cabildo, to the west, which was renovated during the construction of Avenida de Mayo and Julio A. Roca. To the south is the Congreso de la Nación (National Congress), which currently houses the Academia Nacional de la Historia (National Academy of History). Lastly, to the northwest, is City Hall.

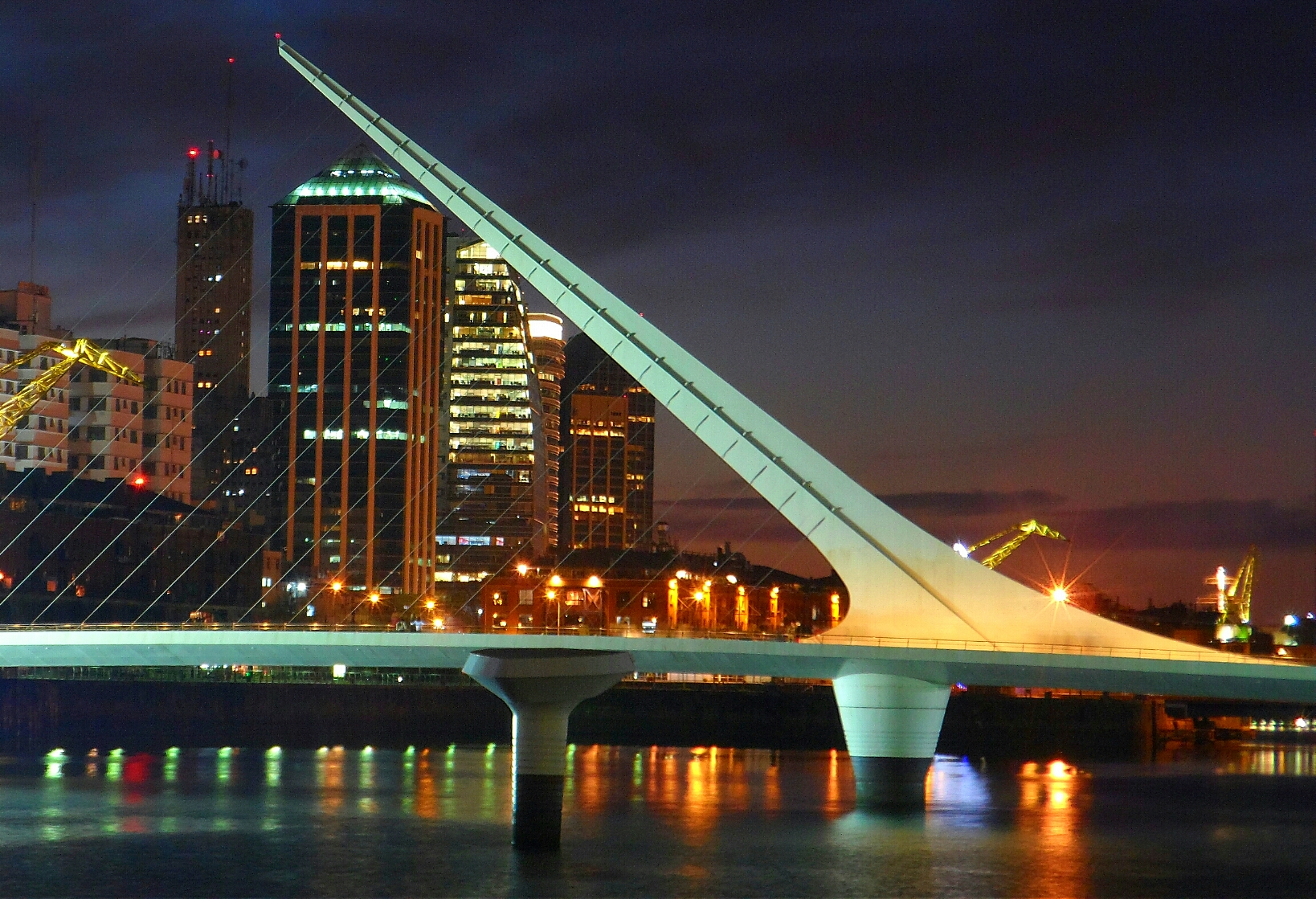
Puente de la Mujer in Puerto Madero

Buenos Aires has become a recipient of LGBT tourism, due to the existence of some gay-friendly sites and the legalization of same-sex marriage on 15 July 2010, making it the first country in Latin America, the second in the Americas, and the tenth in the world to do so. Its Gender Identity Law, passed in 2012, made Argentina the "only country that allows people to change their gender identities without facing barriers such as hormone therapy, surgery or psychiatric diagnosis that labels them as having an abnormality". In 2015, the World Health Organization cited Argentina as an exemplary country for providing transgender rights. Despite these legal advances, however, homophobia continues to be a hotly contested social issue in the city and the country.

Buenos Aires has various types of accommodation ranging from luxurious five star hotels in the city center to budget hotels located in suburban neighborhoods. Nonetheless, the city's transportation system allows easy and inexpensive access to the city. There were, as of February 2008, 23 five-star, 61 four-star, 59 three-star and 87 two or one-star hotels, as well as 25 boutique hotels and 39 apart-hotels; another 298 hostels, bed & breakfasts, vacation rentals and other non-hotel establishments were registered in the city. In all, nearly 27,000 rooms were available for tourism in Buenos Aires, of which about 12,000 belonged to four-star, five-star, or boutique hotels. Establishments of a higher category typically enjoy the city's highest occupation rates. The majority of the hotels are located in the central part of the city, in close proximity to most main tourist attractions.

== Transportation ==
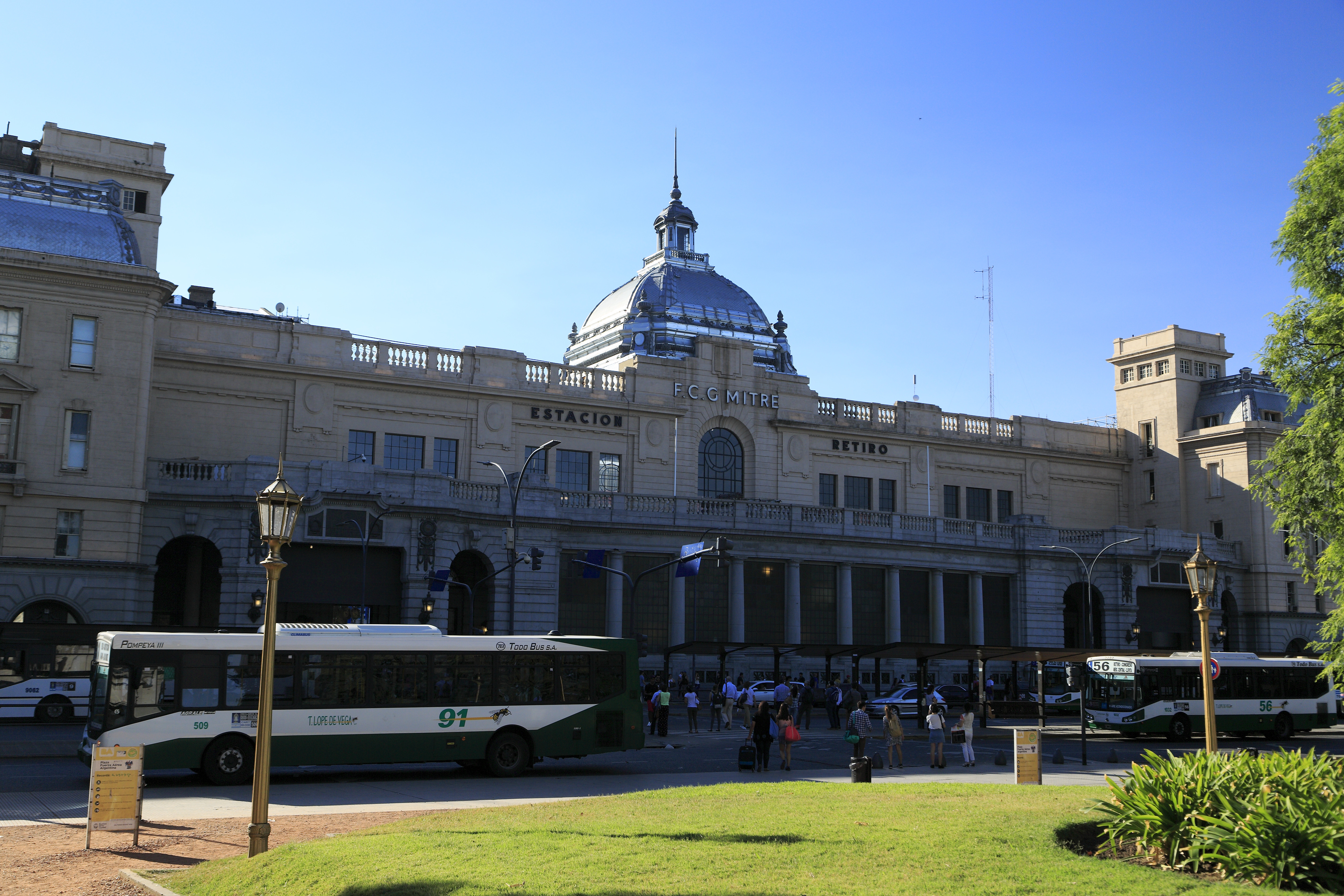
Retiro Mitre railway station.

According to data released by Moovit in July 2017, the average amount of time people spend commuting with public transit in Buenos Aires, for example to and from work, on a weekday is 79 min. 23% of public transit riders, ride for more than 2 hours every day. The average amount of time people wait at a stop or station for public transit is 14 min, while 20 percent of riders wait for over 20 minutes on average every day. The average distance people usually ride in a single trip with public transit is 8.9 km (5.5 mi), while 21% travel for over 12 km (7.5 mi).

=== Roads ===
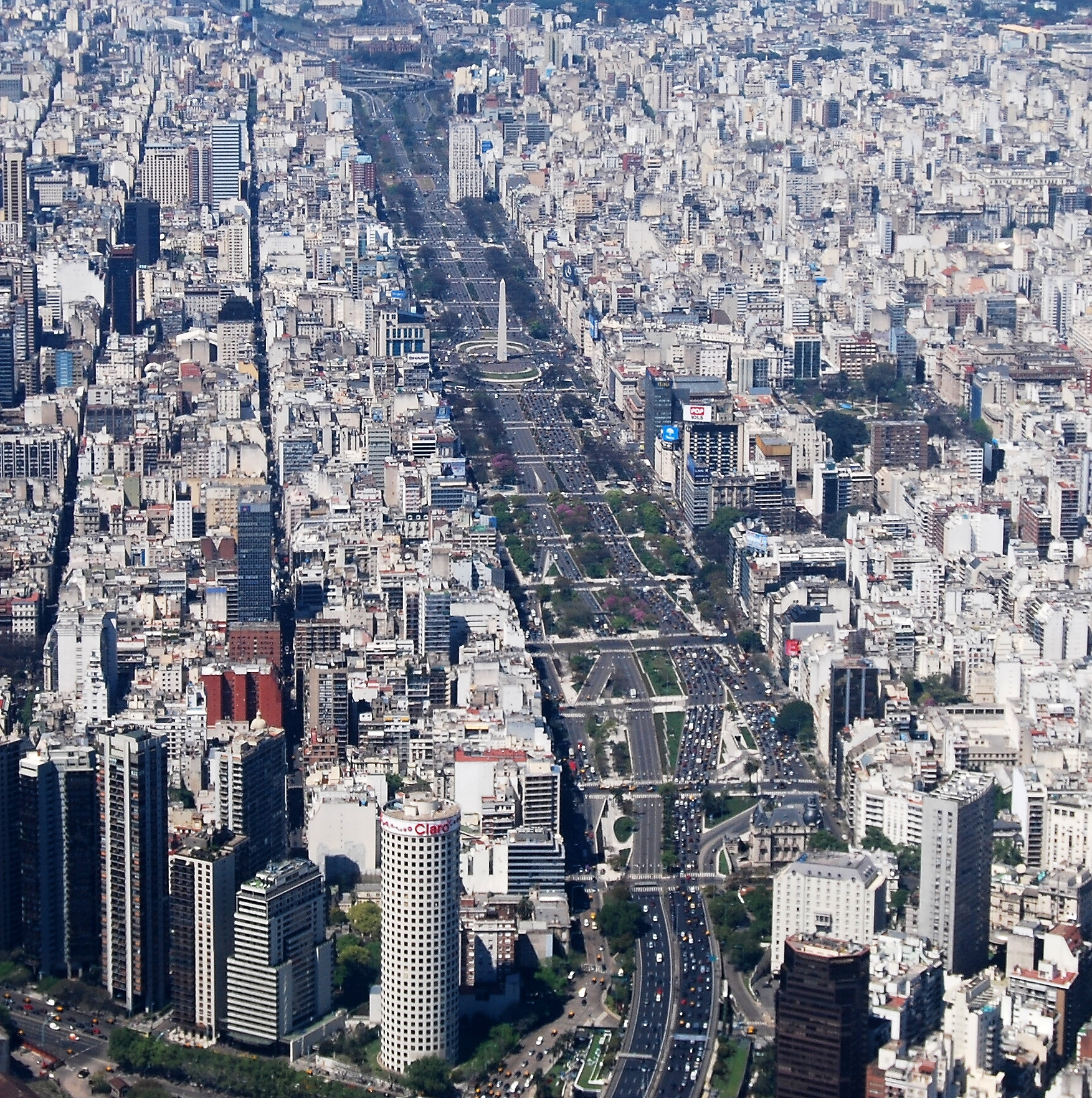
Avenida 9 de Julio

Buenos Aires is based on a rectangular grid pattern, save for natural barriers or the relatively rare developments explicitly designed otherwise (most notably, the Parque Chas neighborhood). The rectangular grid provides for 110-meter (361 ft)-long square blocks named manzanas. Pedestrian zones in the central business district such as Florida Street are partially car-free and always bustling, access provided by bus and the Underground (subte) Line C. Buenos Aires, for the most part, is a very walkable city and the majority of residents in Buenos Aires use public transport.

Two diagonal avenues alleviate traffic and provide better access to Plaza de Mayo and the city center in general; most avenues running into and out of it are one-way and feature six or more lanes, with computer-controlled green waves to speed up traffic outside of peak times. The city's principal avenues include the 140-meter (459 ft)-wide Avenida 9 de Julio, the over 35-kilometer (22 mi)-long Rivadavia Avenue, and Corrientes Avenue, the main thoroughfare of culture and entertainment.

In the 1940s and 1950s, the construction of the General Paz Avenue beltway that surrounds the city along its border with Buenos Aires Province, and the freeways leading to the new international airport and to the northern suburbs, heralded a new era for Buenos Aires traffic. Encouraged by pro-automaker policies that were pursued towards the end of the Perón (1955) and Frondizi administrations (1958–62) in particular, auto sales nationally grew from an average of 30,000 during the 1920–57 era to around 250,000 in the 1970s and over 600,000 in 2008. Today, over 1.8 million vehicles (nearly one-fifth of Argentina's total) are registered in Buenos Aires.

Toll motorways opened in the late 1970s by mayor Osvaldo Cacciatore, now used by over a million vehicles daily, provide convenient access to the city center. Cacciatore likewise had financial district streets (roughly 1 square kilometer (0.39 sq mi) in area) closed to private cars during daytime. Most major avenues are, however, gridlocked at peak hours. Following the economic mini-boom of the 1990s, record numbers started commuting by car and congestion increased, as did the time-honored Argentine custom of taking weekends off in the countryside.

=== Airports ===
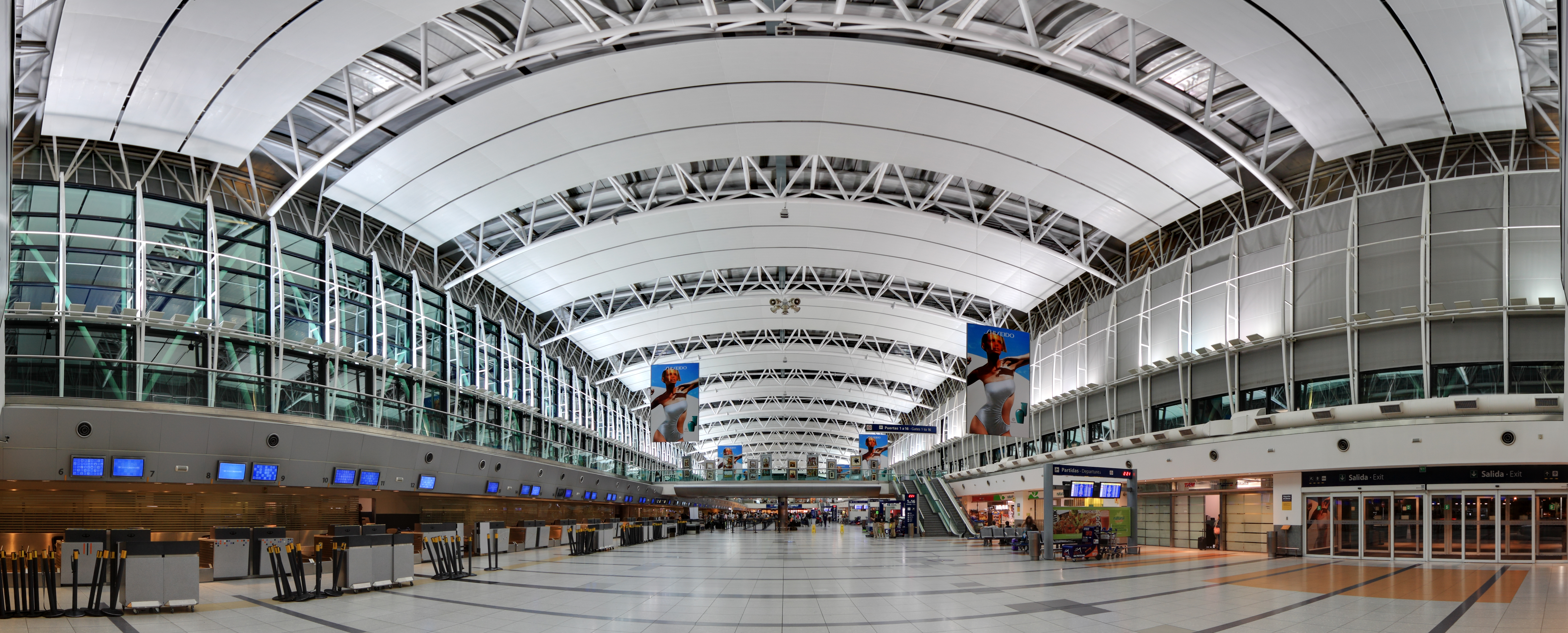
Interior of Ministro Pistarini International Airport

The Ministro Pistarini International Airport, commonly known as Ezeiza Airport, is located in the suburb of Ezeiza, in Buenos Aires Province, approximately 22 km (14 mi) south of the city. This airport handles most international air traffic to and from Argentina as well as some domestic flights.

The Aeroparque Jorge Newbery airport, located in the Palermo district of the city next to the riverbank, is the only one within the city limits and serves primarily domestic traffic within Argentina and some regional flights to neighboring South American countries.

Other minor airports near the city are El Palomar Airport, which is located 18 km (11 mi) west of the city and handles some scheduled domestic flights to a number of destinations in Argentina, and the smaller San Fernando Airport which serves only general aviation.

=== Urban rail ===
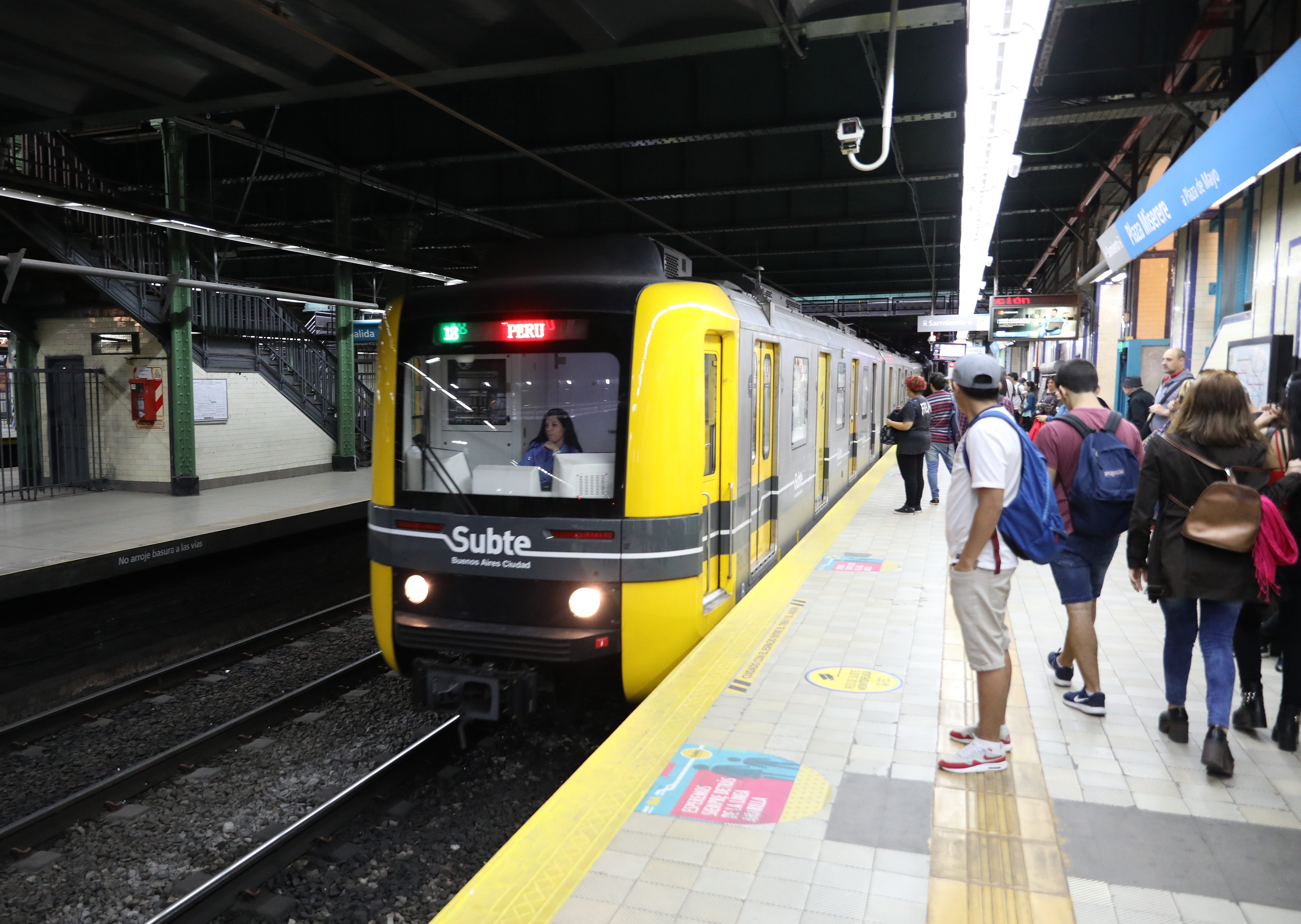
Train entering Plaza Miserere Station, A Line, Buenos Aires Underground

Planned expansion of the Buenos Aires Underground network

The Buenos Aires Underground (locally known as Subte, from "subterráneo" meaning underground or subway), is a high-yield system providing access to various parts of the city. Opened in 1913, it is the oldest underground system in the Southern Hemisphere and oldest in the Spanish-speaking world. The system has six underground lines and one overground line, named by letters (A to E, and H) and there are 107 stations, and 58.8 km (37 mi) of route, including the Premetro line. An expansion program is underway to extend existing lines into the outer neighborhoods and add a new north–south line. Route length is expected to reach 89 km (55 mi) by 2011.

Line A is the oldest one (service opened to public in 1913) and stations kept the "belle-époque" decoration, while the original rolling stock from 1913, affectionately known as Las Brujas were retired from the line in 2013. Daily ridership on weekdays is 1.7 million and on the increase. Fares remain relatively cheap, although the city government raised fares by over 125% in January 2012. A single journey, with unlimited interchanges between lines, costs AR$42, which is roughly US$0.23 as of January 2023.

The most recent expansions to the network were the addition of numerous stations to the network in 2013: San José de Flores and San Pedrito to Line A, Echeverría and Juan Manuel de Rosas to Line B and Hospitales to Line H. Current works include the completion of Line H northwards and addition of three new stations to Line E in the city center. The construction of Line F is due to commence in 2015, while two other lines are planned for construction in the future.

The Buenos Aires commuter rail system has seven lines: Belgrano Norte; Belgrano Sur; Roca; San Martín; Sarmiento; Mitre; and Urquiza. The Buenos Aires commuter network system is very extensive: every day more than 1.3 million people commute to the Argentine capital. These suburban trains operate between 4 am and 1 am. The Buenos Aires commuter rail network also connects the city with long-distance rail services to Rosario and Córdoba, among other metropolitan areas. The city center is home to four principal terminals for both long-distance and local passenger services: Constitucion, Retiro, Federico Lacroze and Once. In addition, Buenos Aires station serves as a minor terminus.

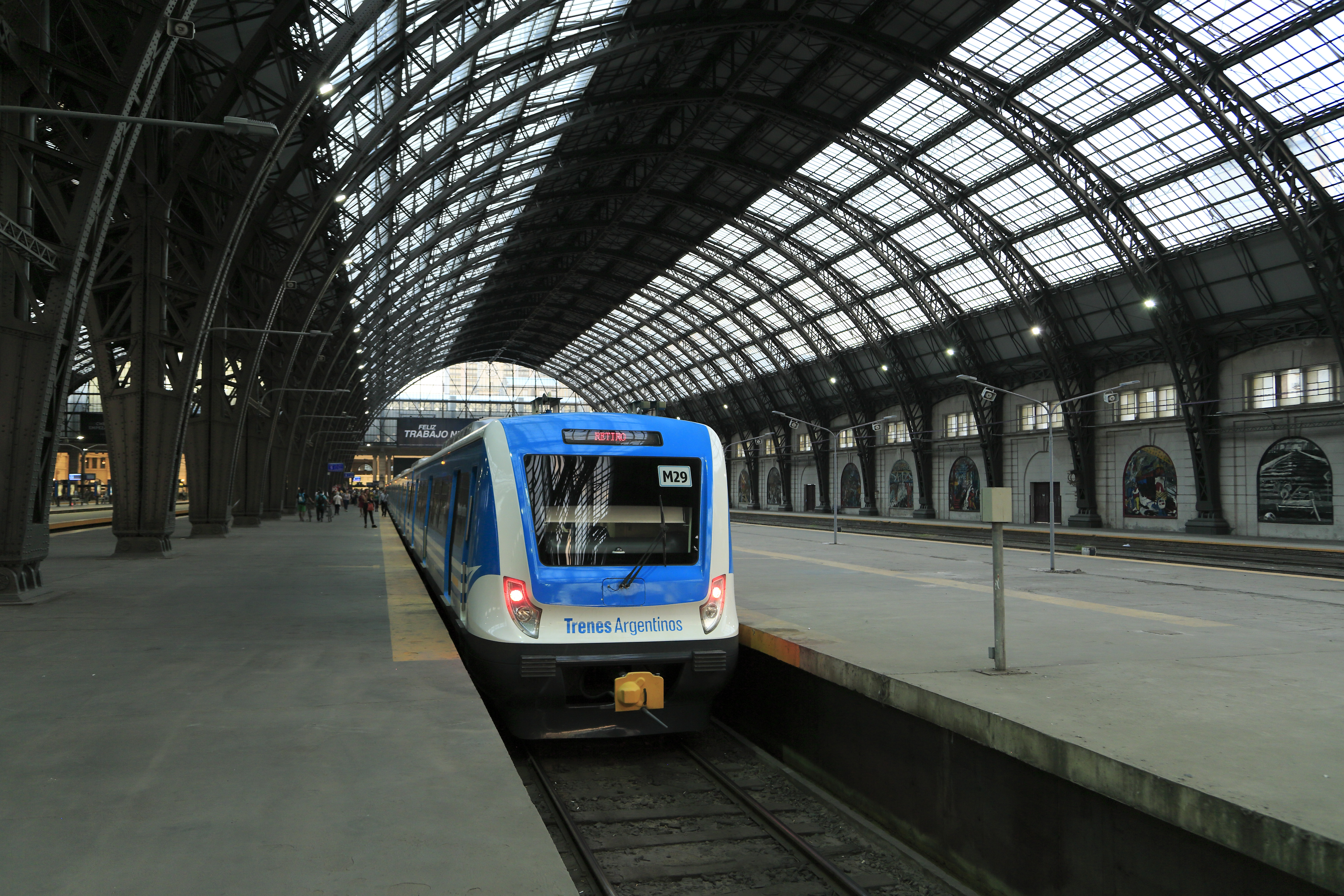
A Mitre Line Trenes Argentinos train in Retiro railway station

Commuter rail in the city is mostly operated by the state-owned Trenes Argentinos, though the Urquiza Line and Belgrano Norte Line are operated by private companies Metrovías and Ferrovías respectively. All services had been operated by Ferrocarriles Argentinos until the company's privatization in 1993, and were then operated by a series of private companies until the lines were put back under state control following a series of high-profile accidents.

Since 2013, there has been a series of large investments on the network, with all lines (with the exception of the Urquiza Line) receiving new rolling stock, along with widespread infrastructure improvements, track replacement, electrification work, refurbishments of stations and building entirely new stations. Similarly, almost all level crossings have been replaced by underpasses and overpasses in the city, with plans to replace all of them in the near future. One of the most major projects under way is the electrification of the remaining segments of the Roca Line – the most widely used in the network – and also moving the entire section of the Sarmiento Line which runs through the heart of the city's underground to allow for better frequencies on the line and reduce congestion above ground.

There are also three other major projects on the table. The first would elevate a large segment of the San Martín Line which runs through the city center and electrify the line, while the second would see the electrification and extension of the Belgrano Sur Line to Constitucion station in the city center. If these two projects are completed, then the Belgrano Norte Line would be the only diesel line to run through the city. The third and most ambitious is to build a series of tunnels between three of the city's railway terminals with a large underground central station underneath the Obelisk, connecting all the commuter railway lines in a network dubbed the Red de Expresos Regionales.

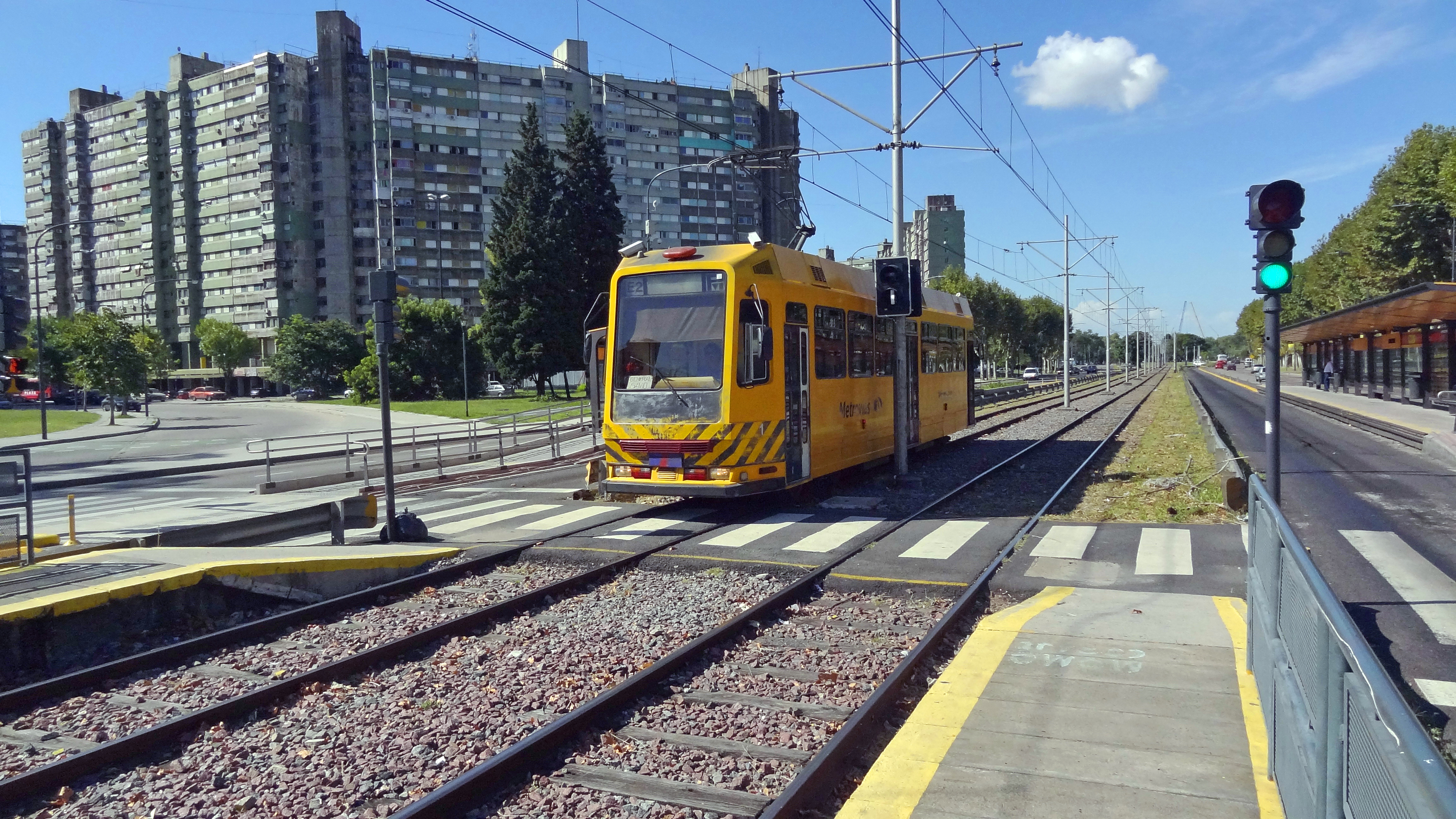
Materfer tram at General Savio station of the Premetro

Buenos Aires had an extensive tram system with over 857 km (533 mi) of track, which was dismantled during the 1960s after the advent of bus transportation, but surface rail transport has made a small comeback in some parts of the city. The PreMetro or Line E2 is a 7.4 km (4.6 mi) light rail line that connects with Underground Line E at Plaza de los Virreyes station and runs to General Savio and Centro Cívico. It is operated by Metrovías. The official inauguration took place on 27 August 1987. A 2 km (1.2 mi) long modern tramway, the Tranvía del Este, opened in 2007 in the Puerto Madero district, initially using two tramcars on temporary loan from Mulhouse, then later a tramcar from Madrid. However, plans to extend the line and acquire a fleet of trams did not come to fruition, and declining patronage led to the line's closure in October 2012. A heritage streetcar maintained by tram fans operates on weekends, near the Primera Junta line A Underground station in the neighborhood of Caballito.

=== Cycling ===
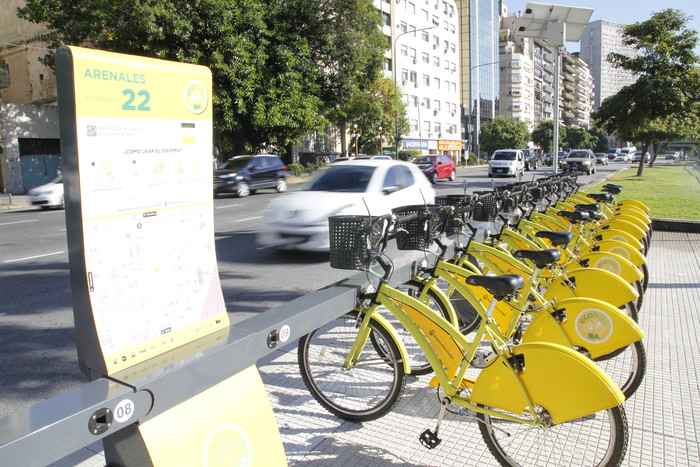
EcoBici

In December 2010, the city government launched a bicycle sharing program with bicycles free for hire by users upon registration. Located in mostly central areas, there are 31 rental stations throughout the city providing over 850 bicycles to be picked up and dropped off at any station within an hour. As of 2013, the city has constructed 110 km (68.35 mi) of protected bicycle lanes and has plans to construct another 100 km (62.14 mi). In 2015, the stations were automated and the service became 24 hours through use of a smart card or mobile phone application.

=== Buses ===
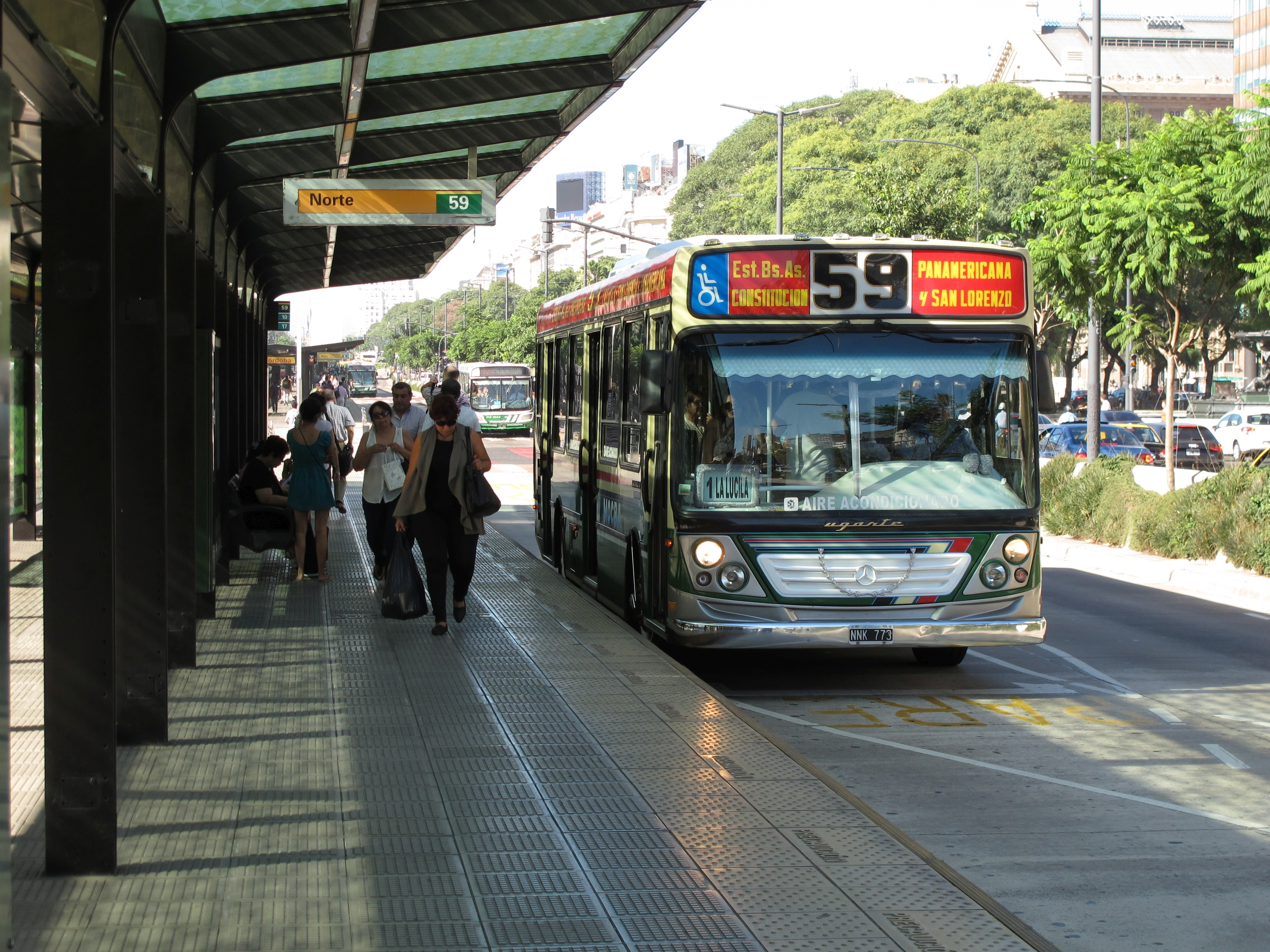
Passengers arriving to a Buenos Aires Metrobus bus stop. Buenos Aires autobus lines can be easily recognized by their colorful designs.

There are over 150 city bus lines called Colectivos, each one managed by an individual company. These high-use bus lines compete with each other and have virtually no public financial support.

Colectivos in Buenos Aires do not have a fixed timetable, but run from four to several per hour, depending on the bus line and time of the day. With inexpensive tickets and extensive routes, usually no further than four blocks from commuters' residences, the colectivo is the most popular mode of transport around the city.

Buenos Aires has incoporated bus rapid transit system, the Metrobus. Metrobus lines are used by standard Colectivo lines, working as exclusive roads for buses to circulate with ease through centric and highly transited areas. The system uses modular median stations that serve both directions of travel, which enable pre-paid, multiple-door, level boarding.

=== Port ===
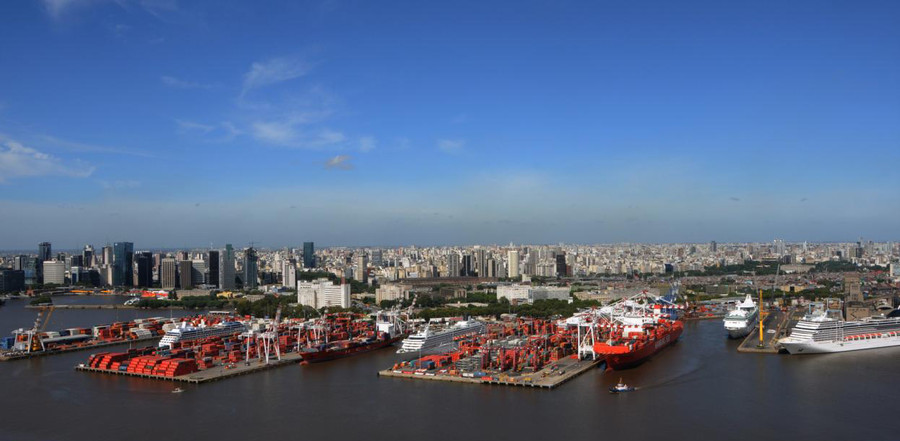
Port of Buenos Aires

The port of Buenos Aires is one of the busiest in South America, as navigable rivers by way of the Rio de la Plata connect the port to northeastern Argentina, Brazil, Uruguay and Paraguay. As a result, it serves as the distribution hub for said vast area of the South American continent. The Port of Buenos Aires handles over 11,000,000 metric tons (11,000,000 long tons; 12,000,000 short tons) annually, and Dock Sud, just south of the city proper, handles another 17,000,000 metric tons (17,000,000 long tons; 19,000,000 short tons). Tax collection related to the port has caused many political problems in the past, including a conflict in 2008 that led to protests and a strike in the agricultural sector after the government raised export tariffs.

=== Ferries ===
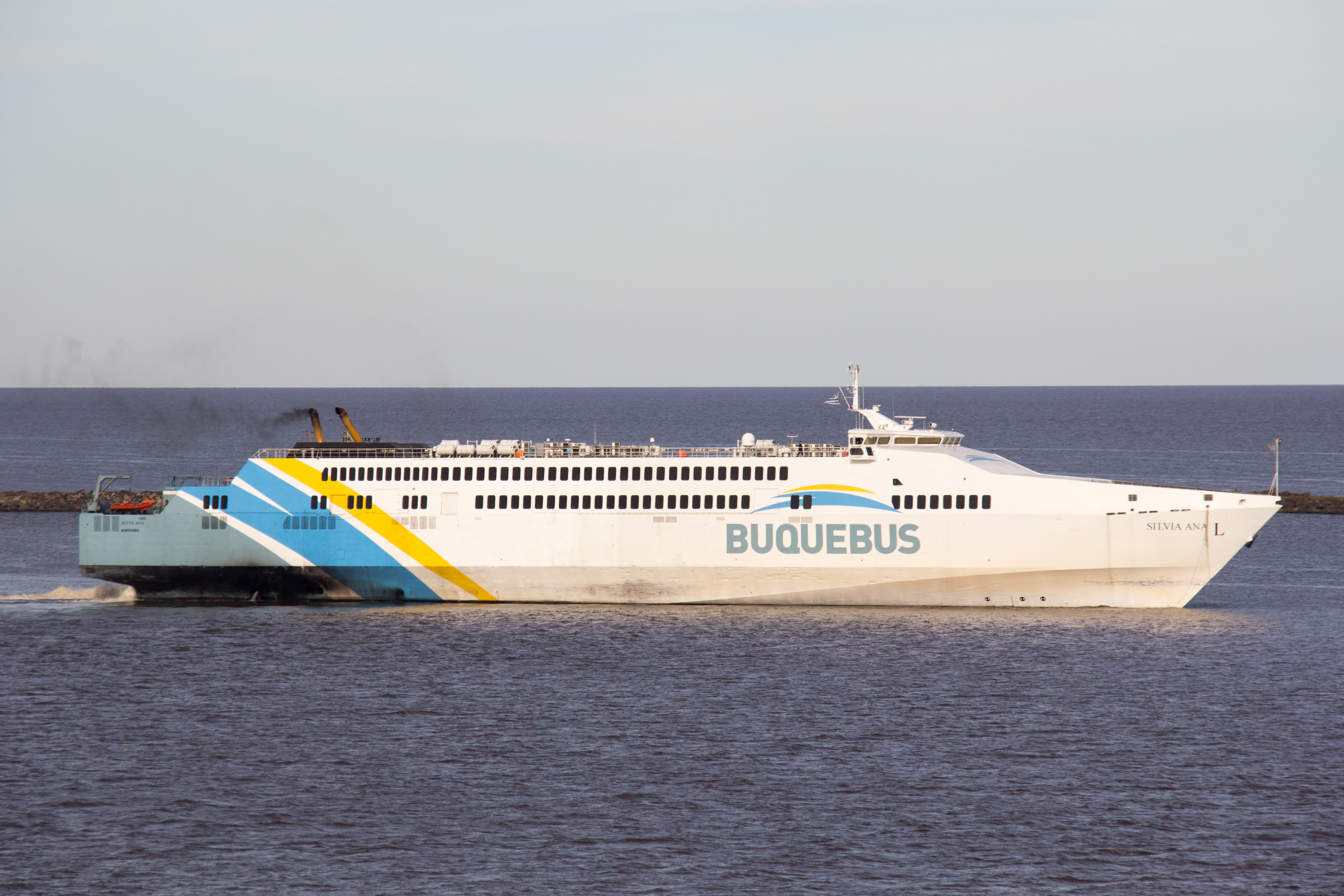
Buquebus high-speed ferries connect Buenos Aires to Uruguay

Buenos Aires is also served by a ferry system operated by the company Buquebus that connects the port of Buenos Aires with the main cities of Uruguay (Colonia del Sacramento, Montevideo and Punta del Este). More than 2.2 million people per year travel between Argentina and Uruguay with Buquebus. One of these ships is a catamaran, which can reach a top speed of about 80 km/h (50 mph).

=== Taxis ===
A fleet of 40,000 black-and-yellow taxis ply the streets at all hours. Some taxi drivers may try to take advantage of tourists, but radio-link companies provide reliable and safe service; many such companies provide incentives for frequent users. Low-fare limo services, known as remises, are also popular. though currently giving way to ridesharing companies like Uber or Cabify, whose legal status has been the cause of much dispute with the city government.

== Culture ==
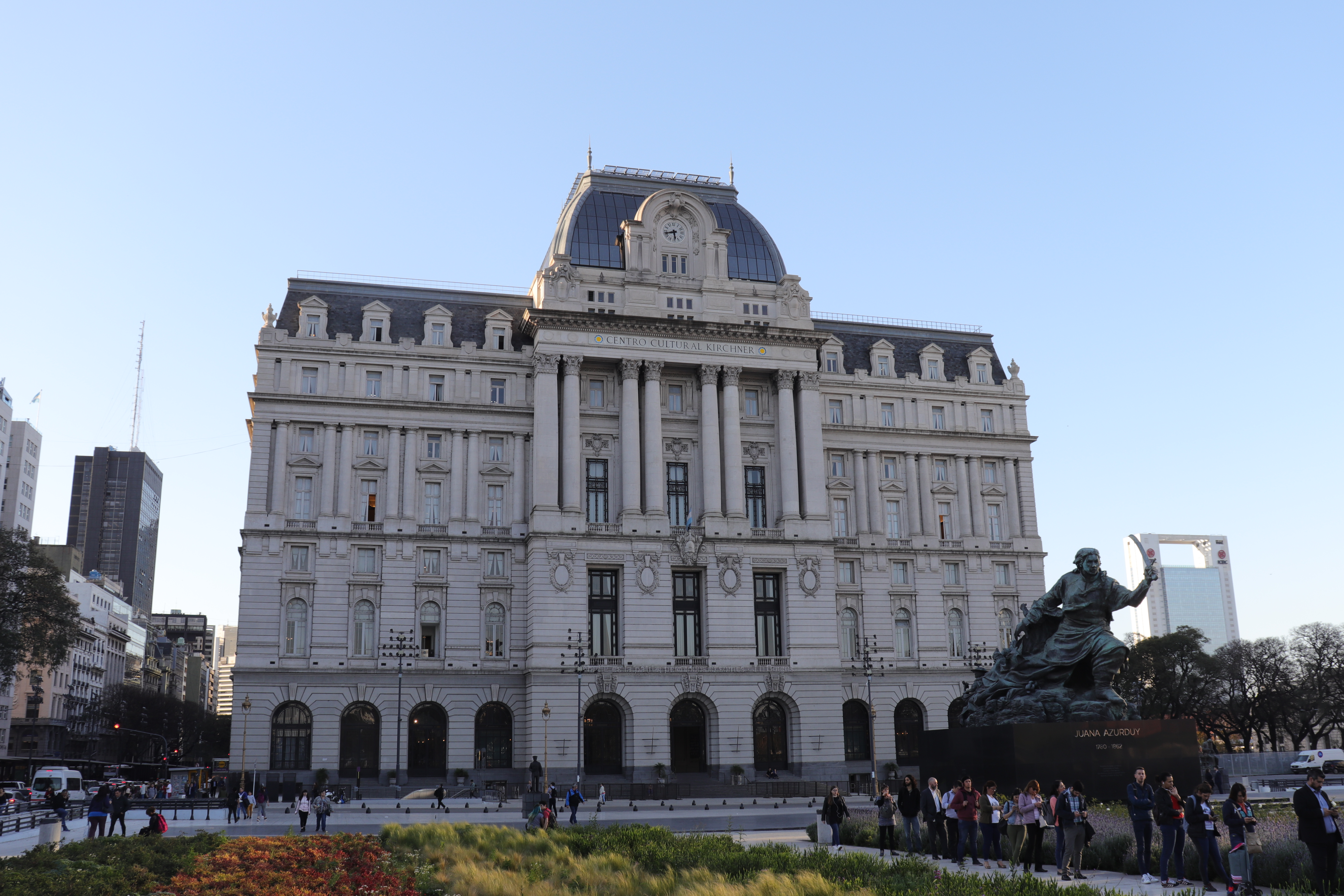
The Post and Telecommunications Palace currently houses the Domingo Faustino Sarmiento Cultural Center, but in the past, it was the largest postal center in South America.

As Buenos Aires is strongly influenced by European culture, the city is sometimes referred to as the "Paris of South America". With its scores of theaters and productions, the city has the busiest live theater industry in South America. In fact, every weekend, there are about 300 active theaters with plays, a number that places the city as 1st worldwide, more than either London, New York or Paris, cultural Meccas in themselves. The number of cultural festivals with more than 10 sites and five years of existence also places the city as 2nd worldwide, after Edinburgh. The Palacio Libertad, located in Buenos Aires, is the largest cultural center of Latin America, and the third worldwide.

Buenos Aires is the home of the Teatro Colón, an internationally rated opera house. There are several symphony orchestras and choral societies. The city has numerous museums related to arts and crafts, history, fine arts, modern arts, decorative arts, popular arts, sacred art, theater and popular music, as well as the preserved homes of noted art collectors, writers, composers and artists. The city is home to hundreds of bookstores, public libraries and cultural associations (it is sometimes called "the city of books"), as well as the largest concentration of active theaters in Latin America. It has a zoo and botanical garden, a large number of landscaped parks and squares, as well as churches and places of worship of many denominations, many of which are architecturally noteworthy.

The city has been a member of the UNESCO Creative Cities Network after it was named "City of Design" in 2005.

=== Art ===
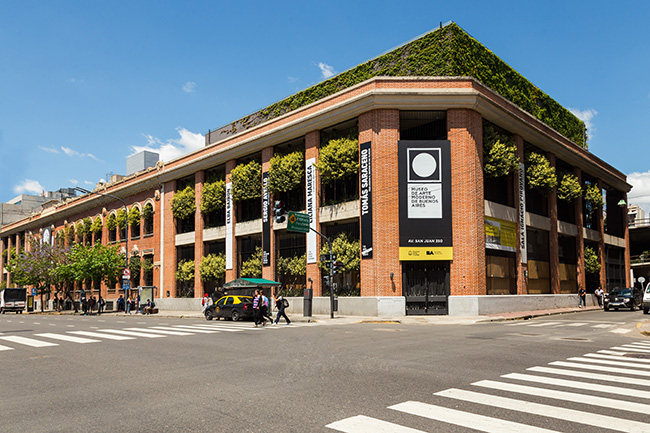
Buenos Aires Museum of Modern Art

Buenos Aires has a thriving arts culture, with "a huge inventory of museums, ranging from obscure to world-class." The barrios of Palermo and Recoleta are the city's traditional bastions in the diffusion of art, although in recent years there has been a tendency of appearance of exhibition venues in other districts such as Puerto Madero or La Boca; renowned venues include MALBA, the National Museum of Fine Arts, Fundación Proa, Faena Arts Center, and the Usina del Arte. Other popular institutions are the Buenos Aires Museum of Modern Art, the Benito Quinquela Martín Museum, the Evita Museum, the Museo de Arte Hispanoamericano Isaac Fernández Blanco, the José Hernández Museum, and the Palais de Glace, among others. A traditional event that occurs once a year is La Noche de los Museos ("Night of the Museums"), when the city's museums, universities, and artistic spaces open their doors for free until early morning; it usually takes place in November.

The first major artistic movements in Argentina coincided with the first signs of political liberty in the country, such as the 1913 sanction of the secret ballot and universal male suffrage, the first president to be popularly elected (1916), and the cultural revolution that involved the University Reform of 1918. In this context, in which there continued to be influence from the Paris School (Modigliani, Chagall, Soutine, Klee), three main groups arose. Buenos Aires has been the birthplace of several artists and movements of national and international relevance and has become a central motif in Argentine artistic production, especially since the 20th century.

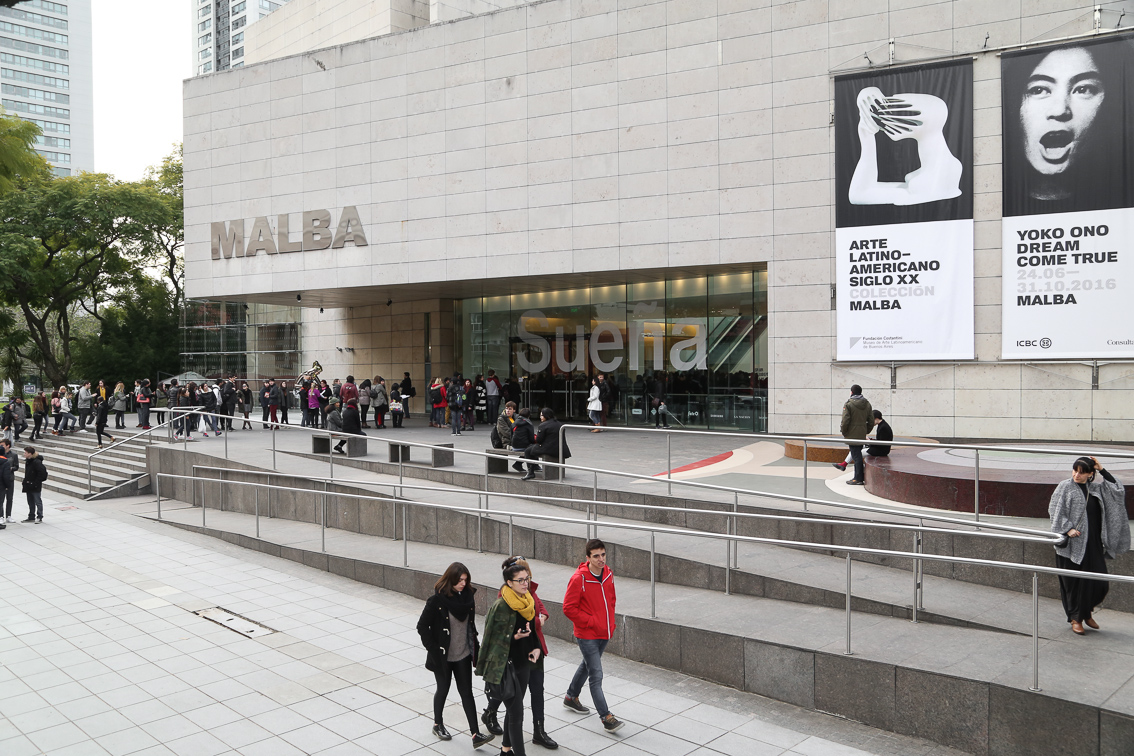
Buenos Aires Latin American Art Museum (MALBA)

Examples include: the Paris Group – so named for being influenced by the School of Paris – constituted by Antonio Berni, Aquiles Badi, Lino Enea Spilimbergo, Raquel Forner and Alfredo Bigatti, among others; and the La Boca artists – including Benito Quinquela Martín and Alfredo Lazzari, among others – who mostly came from Italy or were of Italian descent, and usually painted scenes from working-class port neighborhoods. During the 1960s, the Torcuato di Tella Institute – located in Florida Street – became a leading local center for pop art, performance art, installation art, conceptual art, and experimental theater; this generation of artists included Marta Minujín, Dalila Puzzovio, David Lamelas, Clorindo Testa and Diana Dowek.

Buenos Aires has also become a prominent center of contemporary street art; its welcoming attitude has made it one of the world's top capitals of such expression. The city's turbulent modern political history has "bred an intense sense of expression in porteños", and urban art has been used to depict these stories and as a means of protest. However, not all of its street art concerns politics, it is also used as a symbol of democracy and freedom of expression. Murals and graffiti are so common that they are considered "an everyday occurrence," and have become part of the urban landscape of barrios such as Palermo, Villa Urquiza, Coghlan and San Telmo. This has to do with the legality of such activities —provided that the building owner has consented—, and the receptiveness of local authorities, who even subsidize various works. The abundance of places for urban artists to create their work, and the relatively lax rules for street art, have attracted international artists such as Blu, Jef Aérosol, Aryz, ROA, and Ron English. Guided tours to see murals and graffiti around the city have been growing steadily.

=== Literature ===
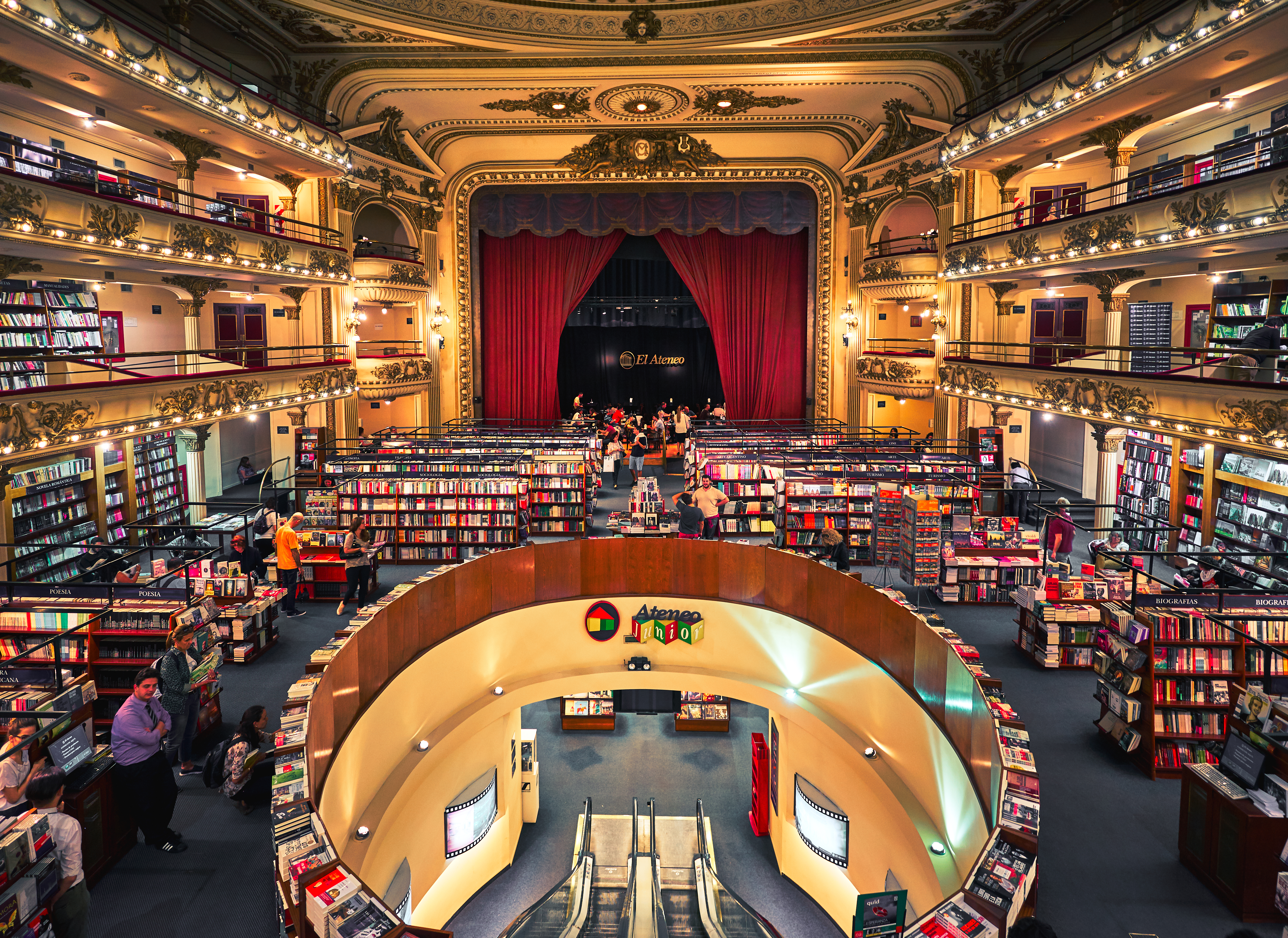
The interior of El Ateneo Grand Splendid, a celebrated bookstore located in the barrio of Recoleta

Buenos Aires has long been considered an intellectual and literary capital of Latin America and the Spanish-speaking world. Despite its short urban history, Buenos Aires has an abundant literary production; its mythical-literary network "has grown at the same rate at which the streets of the city earned its shores to the pampas and buildings stretched its shadow on the curb." During the late 19th and early 20th centuries, culture boomed along with the economy and the city emerged as a literary capital and the seat of South America's most powerful publishing industry, and "even if the economic path grew rocky, ordinary Argentines embraced and stuck to the habit of reading." By the 1930s, Buenos Aires was the undisputed literary capital of the Spanish-speaking world, with Victoria Ocampo founding the highly influential Sur magazine—which dominated Spanish-language literature for thirty years— and the arrival of prominent Spanish writers and editors who were escaping the civil war.

Buenos Aires is one of the most prolific book publishers in Latin America and has more bookstores per capita than any other major city in the world. Buenos Aires has at least 734 bookstores—roughly 25 bookshops for every 100,000 inhabitants—far above other world cities like London, Paris, Madrid, Moscow and New York. The city also has a thriving market for secondhand books, ranking third in terms of secondhand bookshops per inhabitant, most of them congregated along Avenida Corrientes. Buenos Aires' book market has been described as "catholic in taste, immune to fads or fashion", with "wide and varied demand." The popularity of reading among porteños has been variously linked to the wave of mass immigration in the late 19th and early 20th centuries and to the city's "obsession" with psychoanalysis.

The Buenos Aires International Book Fair has been a major event in the city since the first fair in 1975, having been described as "perhaps the most important and largest annual literary event in the Spanish-speaking world," and "the most important cultural event in Latin America". In its 2019 edition, the Book Fair was attended by 1.8 million people.

Buenos Aires was designated as the World Book Capital for the year 2011 by UNESCO.

=== Music ===
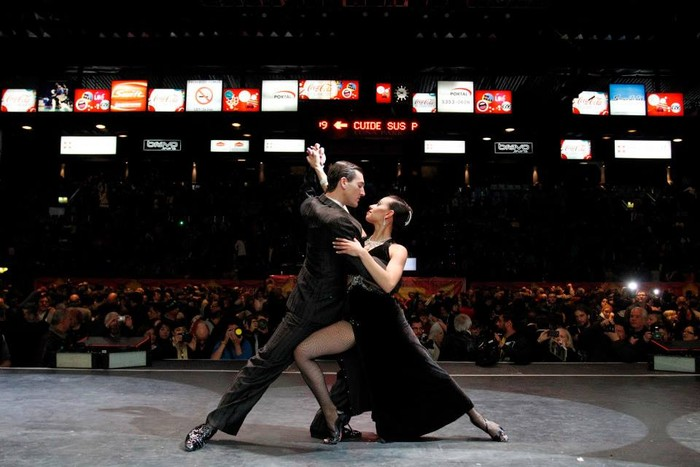
Tango dancers during the World tango dance tournament

According to the Harvard Dictionary of Music, "Argentina has one of the richest art music traditions and perhaps the most active contemporary musical life" in South America. Buenos Aires boasts of several professional orchestras, including the Argentine National Symphony Orchestra, the Ensamble Musical de Buenos Aires and the Camerata Bariloche; as well as various conservatories that offer professional music education, like the Conservatorio Nacional Superior de Música. As a result of the growth and commercial prosperity of the city in the late 18th century, theater became a vital force in Argentine musical life, offering Italian and French operas and Spanish zarzuelas. Italian music was very influential during the 19th century and the early 20th century, in part because of immigration, but operas and salon music were also composed by Argentines, including Francisco Hargreaves and Juan Gutiérrez. A nationalist trend that drew from Argentine traditions, literature and folk music was an important force during the 19th century, including composers Alberto Williams, Julián Aguirre, Arturo Berutti and Felipe Boero. In the 1930s, composers such as Juan Carlos Paz and Alberto Ginastera "began to espouse a cosmopolitan and modernist style, influenced by twelve-tone techniques and serialism"; while avant-garde music thrived by the 1960s, with the Rockefeller Foundation financing the Centro Interamericano de Altos Estudios Musicales, which brought internationally famous composers to work and teach in Buenos Aires, also establishing an electronic music studio.

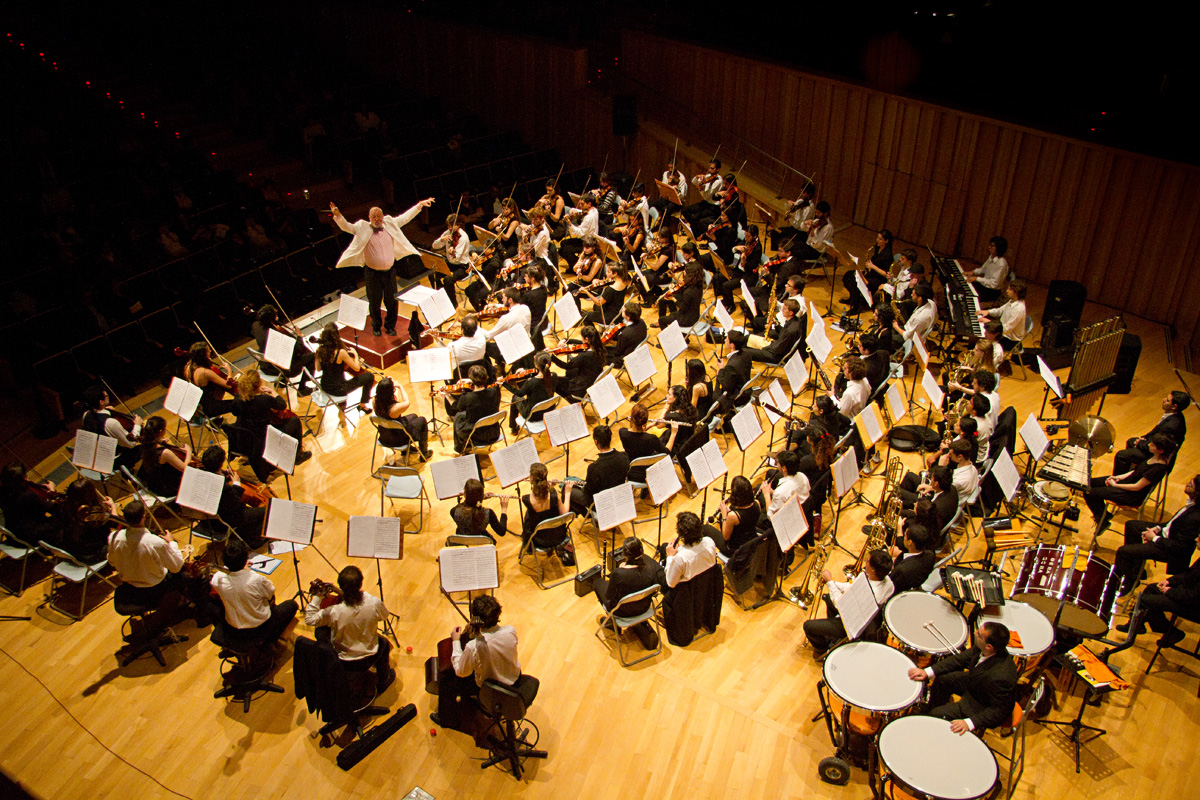
The Buenos Aires Philharmonic

The Río de la Plata is known for being the birthplace of tango, which is considered an emblem of Buenos Aires. The city considers itself the Tango World Capital, and as such hosts many related events, the most important being an annual festival and world tournament. The most important exponent of the genre is Carlos Gardel, followed by Aníbal Troilo; other important composers include Alfredo Gobbi, Ástor Piazzolla, Osvaldo Pugliese, Mariano Mores, Juan D'Arienzo and Juan Carlos Cobián. Tango music experienced a period of splendor during the 1940s, while in the 1960s and 1970s nuevo tango appeared, incorporating elements of classical and jazz music. A contemporary trend is neotango (also known as electrotango), with exponents such as Bajofondo and Gotan Project. On 30 September 2009, UNESCO's Intergovernmental Committee of Intangible Heritage declared tango part of the world's cultural heritage, making Argentina eligible to receive financial assistance in safeguarding tango for future generations.

The city hosts several music festivals every year. A popular genre is electronic dance music, with festivals including Creamfields BA, SAMC, Moonpark, and a local edition of Ultra Music Festival. Other well-known events include the Buenos Aires Jazz Festival, Personal Fest, Quilmes Rock and Pepsi Music. Some music festivals are held in Greater Buenos Aires, like Lollapalooza, which takes place at the Hipódromo de San Isidro in San Isidro.

=== Cinema ===
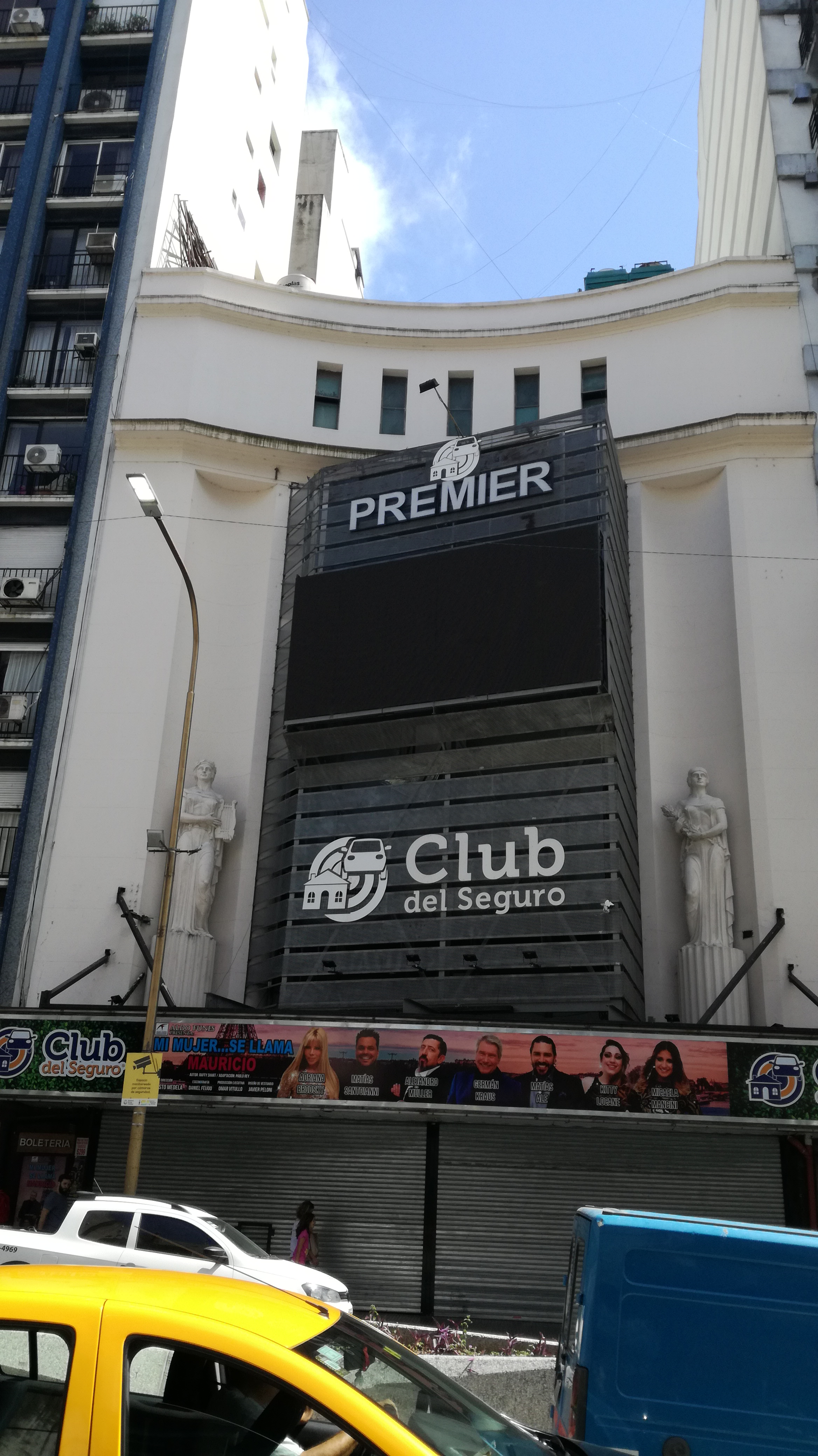
Cine Premier (1944) one of several Art Deco venues in Corrientes Ave.

Argentine cinema history began in Buenos Aires with the first film exhibition on 18 July 1896 at the Teatro Odeón. With his 1897 film, La bandera Argentina, Eugène Py became one of the first filmmakers of the country; the film features a waving Argentine flag located at Plaza de Mayo. In the early 20th century, the first movie theaters of the country opened in Buenos Aires, and newsreels appeared, most notably El Viaje de Campos Salles a Buenos Aires. The real industry emerged with the advent of sound films, the first one being Muñequitas porteñas (1931). The newly founded Argentina Sono Film released ¡Tango! in 1933, the first integral sound production in the country. During the 1930s and the 1940s (commonly referred as the "Golden Age" of Argentine cinema), many films revolved around the city of Buenos Aires and tango culture, reflected in titles such as La vida es un tango, El alma del bandoneón, Adiós Buenos Aires, El Cantor de Buenos Aires and Buenos Aires canta. Argentine films were exported across Latin America, specially Libertad Lamarque's melodramas, and the comedies of Luis Sandrini and Niní Marshall. The popularity of local cinema in the Spanish-speaking world played a key role in the massification of tango music. Carlos Gardel, an iconic figure of tango and Buenos Aires, became an international star by starring in several films during that era.

In response to large studio productions, the "Generation of the 60s" appeared, a group of filmmakers that produced the first modernist films in Argentina during the early years of that decade. These included Manuel Antín, Lautaro Murúa and René Mugica, among others.

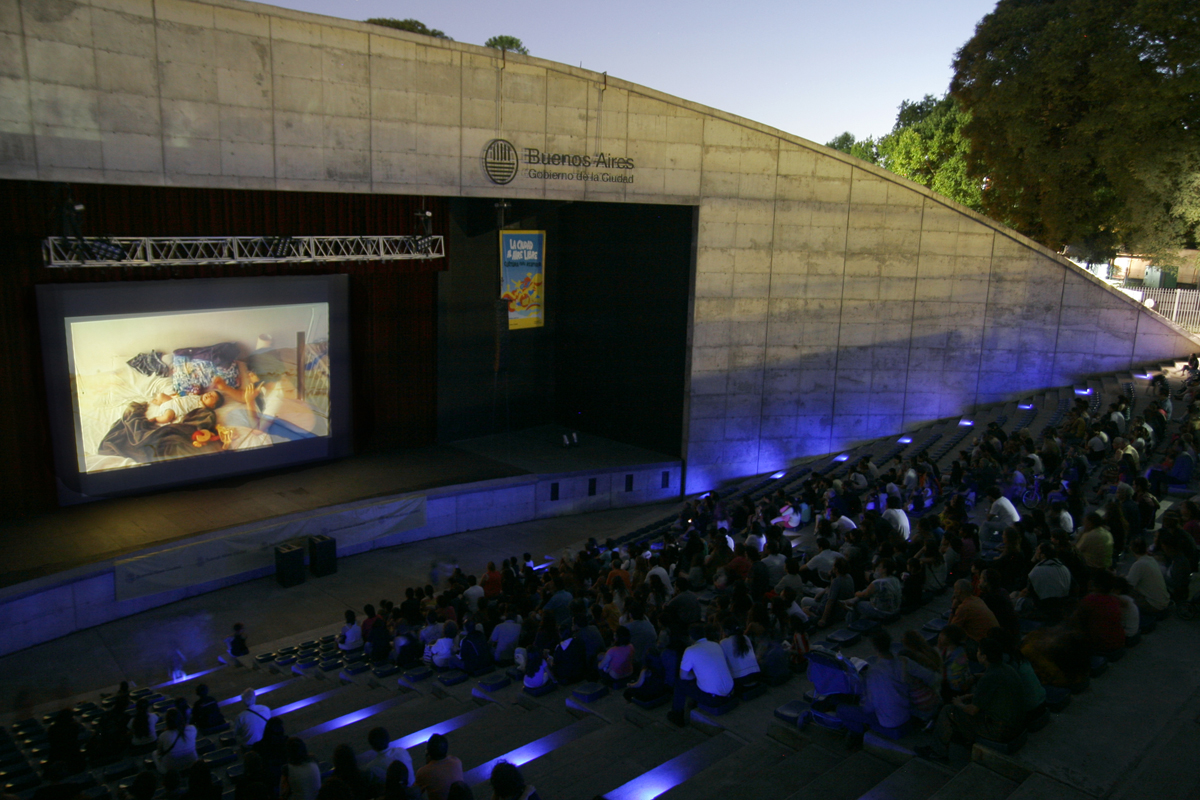
A screening at Parque Centenario, as part of the 2011 edition of BAFICI

During the second half of the decade, films of social protest were presented in clandestine exhibitions, the work of Grupo Cine Liberación and Grupo Cine de la Base, who advocated what they called "Third Cinema". At that time, the country was under a military dictatorship after the coup d'état known as Argentine Revolution. One of the most notable films of this movement is La hora de los hornos (1968) by Fernando Solanas. During the period of democracy between 1973 and 1975, the local cinema experienced critical and commercial success, with titles including Juan Moreira (1973), La Patagonia rebelde (1974), La Raulito (1975), and La tregua (1974) – which became the first Argentine film nominated for the Academy Award for Best Foreign Language Film. However, because of censorship and a new military government, Argentine cinema stalled until the return of democracy in the 1980s. This generation – known as "Argentine Cinema in Liberty and Democracy" – were mostly young or postponed filmmakers and gained international notoriety. Camila (1984) by María Luisa Bemberg was nominated for the Best Foreign Film at the Academy Awards, and Luis Puenzo's La historia oficial (1985) was the first Argentine film to receive the award.

Located in Buenos Aires is the Pablo Ducrós Hicken Museum of Cinema, the only one in the country dedicated to Argentine cinema and a pioneer of its kind in Latin America. Every year, the city hosts the Buenos Aires International Festival of Independent Cinema (BAFICI), which, in its 2015 edition, featured 412 films from 37 countries, and an attendance of 380 thousand people. Buenos Aires also hosts various other festivals and film cycles, like the Buenos Aires Rojo Sangre, devoted to horror.

=== Media ===
Buenos Aires is home to five Argentine television networks: America, Television Pública Argentina, El Nueve, Telefe, and El Trece. Four of them are located in Buenos Aires, and the studios of America is located in La Plata.

=== Fashion ===
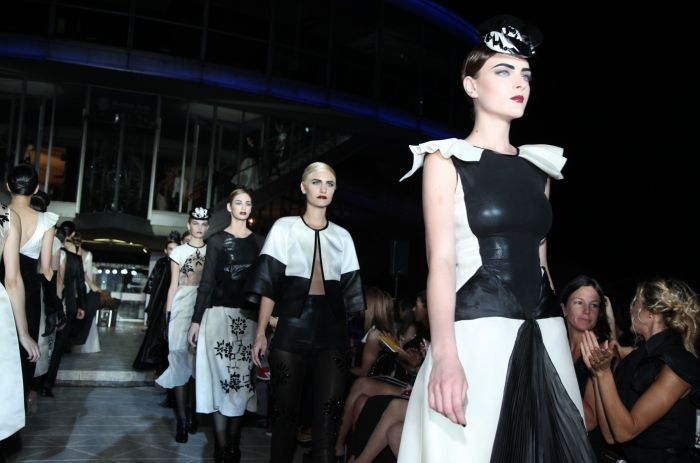
A fashion show at the Planetarium in 2013, as part of BAFWEEK

Buenos Aires' inhabitants have been historically characterized as "fashion-conscious". National designers display their collections annually at the Buenos Aires Fashion Week (BAFWEEK) and related events. Inevitably being a season behind, it fails to receive much international attention. Nevertheless, the city remains an important regional fashion capital. According to Global Language Monitor, as of 2017 the city is the 20th leading fashion capital in the world, ranking second in Latin America after Rio de Janeiro.

In 2005, Buenos Aires was appointed as the first UNESCO City of Design, and received this title once again in 2007. Since 2015, the Buenos Aires International Fashion Film Festival Buenos Aires (BAIFFF) takes place, sponsored by the city and Mercedes-Benz. The government of the city also organizes La Ciudad de Moda ("The City of Fashion"), an annual event that serves as a platform for emerging creators and attempts to boost the sector by providing management tools.

The fashionable neighborhood of Palermo, particularly the area known as Soho, is where the latest fashion and design trends are presented. The "sub-barrio" of Palermo Viejo is also a popular port of call for fashion in the city. An increasing number of young, independent designers are also setting up their own shops in Bohemian San Telmo, known for its wide variety of markets and antique shops. Recoleta, on the other hand, is the epicenter of branches of exclusive and upscale fashion houses. In particular, Avenida Alvear is home to the most exclusive representatives of haute couture in the city.

=== Architecture ===
Buenos Aires architecture is characterized by its eclectic nature, with elements resembling Paris and Madrid. There is a mix, due to immigration, of Colonial, Art Deco, Art Nouveau, Neo-Gothic, and French Bourbon styles. Italian and French influences increased after the declaration of independence at the beginning of the 19th century, although the academic style persisted until the first decades of the 20th century. Attempts at renovation took place during the second half of the 19th century and the beginning of the 20th century, when European influences penetrated into the country, reflected by several buildings of Buenos Aires such as the Iglesia Santa Felicitas by Ernesto Bunge; the Palace of Justice, the National Congress, all of them by Vittorio Meano, and the Teatro Colón, by Francesco Tamburini and Vittorio Meano. The simplicity of the Rioplatense baroque style is evident in Buenos Aires through the works of Italian architects such as André Blanqui and Antonio Masella, in the churches of San Ignacio, Nuestra Señora del Pilar, the Cathedral and the Cabildo.

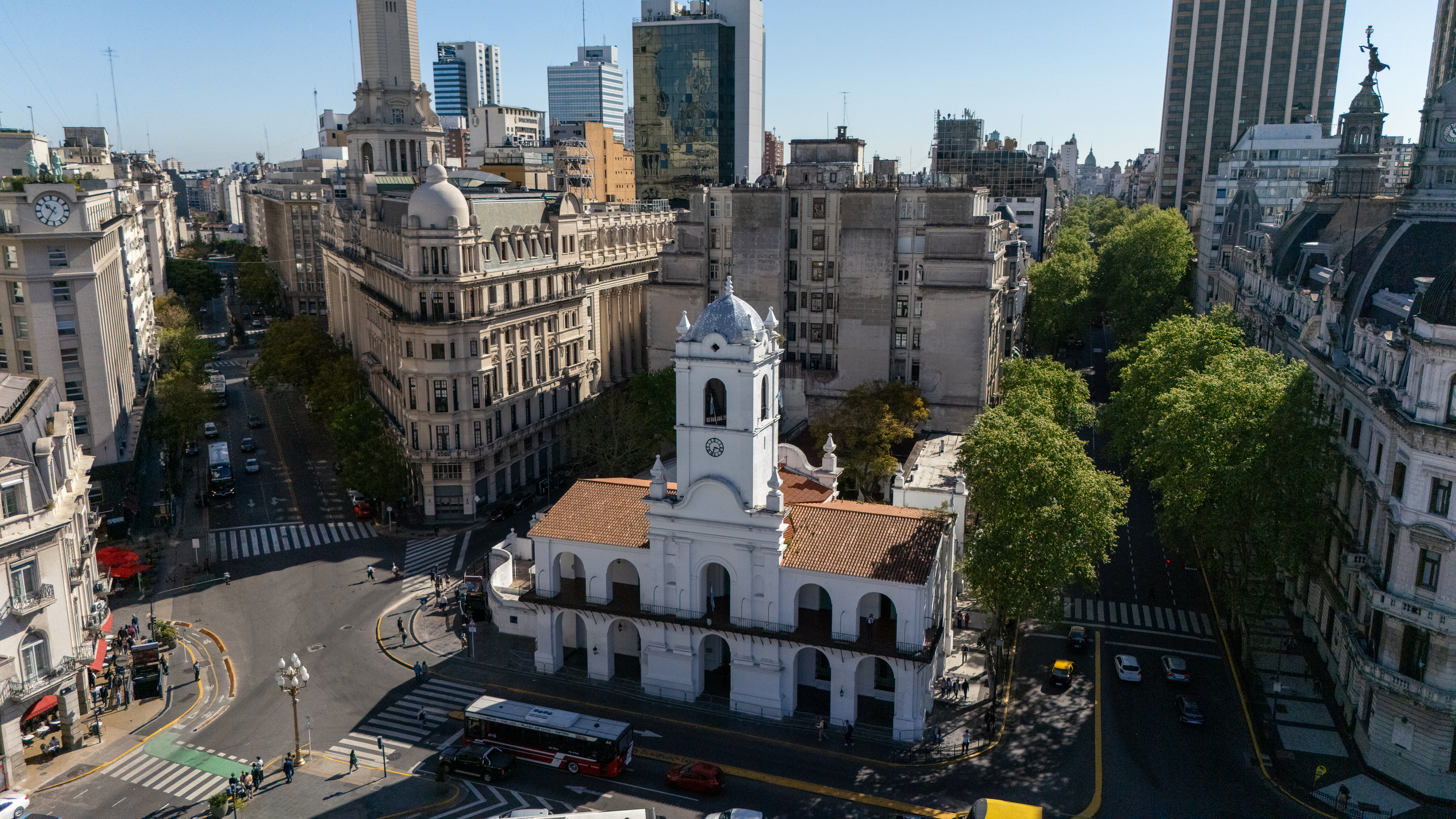
Bolívar Street facing the Cabildo and Diagonal Norte, in Buenos Aires' historical center. The city's characteristic convergence of diverse architectural styles can be seen, including Spanish Colonial, Beaux-Arts and modernist architecture.

In 1912, the Basilica del Santisimo Sacramento was opened to the public; its construction was funded by the generous donation of Argentine philanthropist Mercedes Castellanos de Anchorena, a member of Argentina's most prominent family. The church is an example of French neo-classicism. With high-grade decorations in its interior, the magnificent Mutin-Cavaillé coll organ (the biggest ever installed in an Argentine church with more than four thousand tubes and four manuals) presided the nave. The altar is full of marble and was the biggest ever built in South America at that time.

In 1919, the construction of Palacio Barolo began. This was South America's tallest building at the time and was the first Argentine skyscraper built with concrete (1919–1923). The building was equipped with 9 elevators, plus a twenty-meter-high (65 ft) lobby hall with paintings in the ceiling and Latin phrases embossed in golden bronze letters. A 300,000-candela beacon was installed at the top (110 m), making the building visible even from Uruguay. In 2009, the Barolo Palace went under an exhaustive restoration, and the beacon was made operational again.

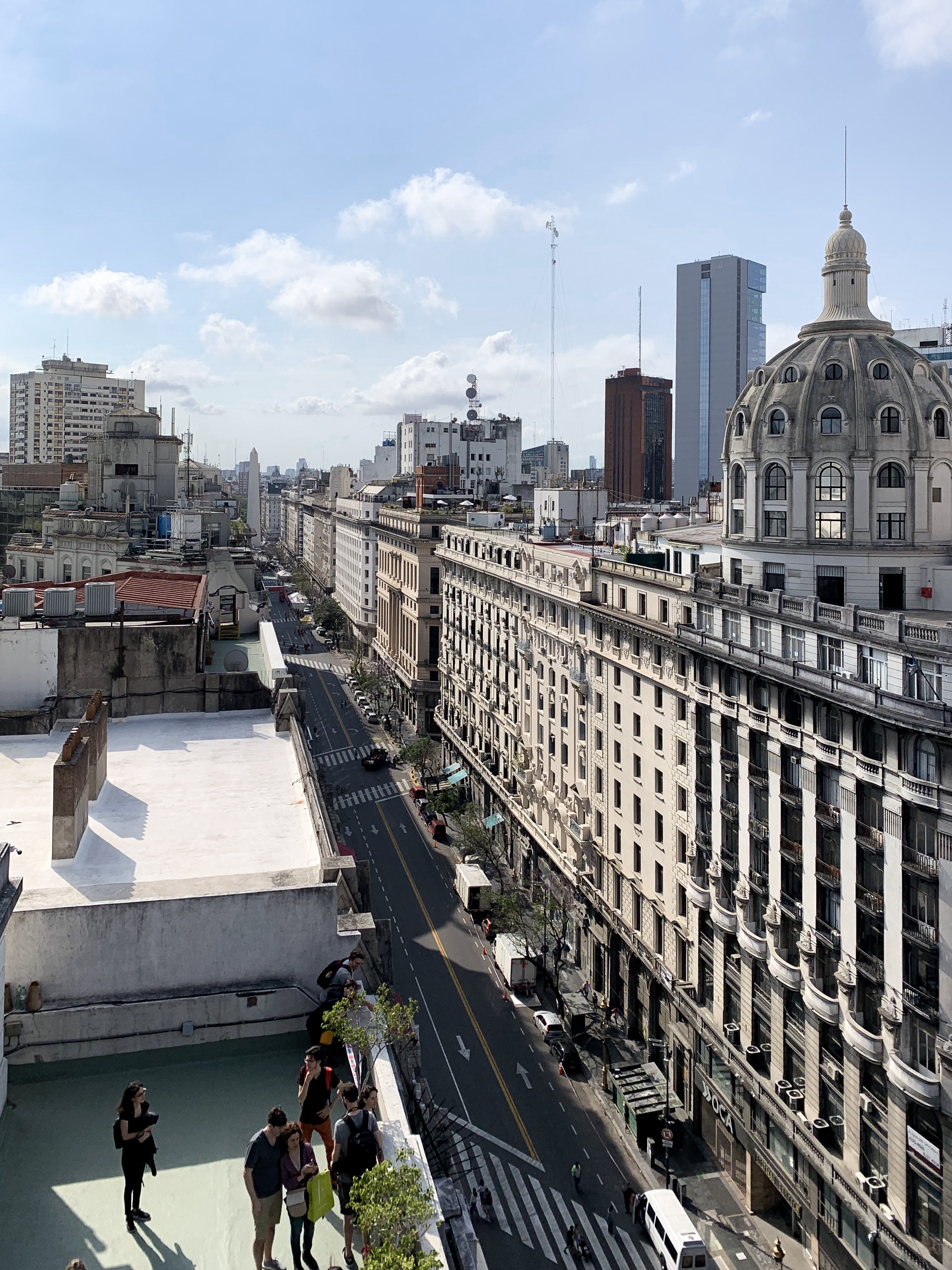
Diagonal Norte

In 1936, the 120-meter-tall (395 ft) Kavanagh Building was inaugurated. The building, with its 12 elevators (provided by Otis) and the world's first central air conditioning system (provided by the North American company Carrier), is still an architectural landmark in Buenos Aires.

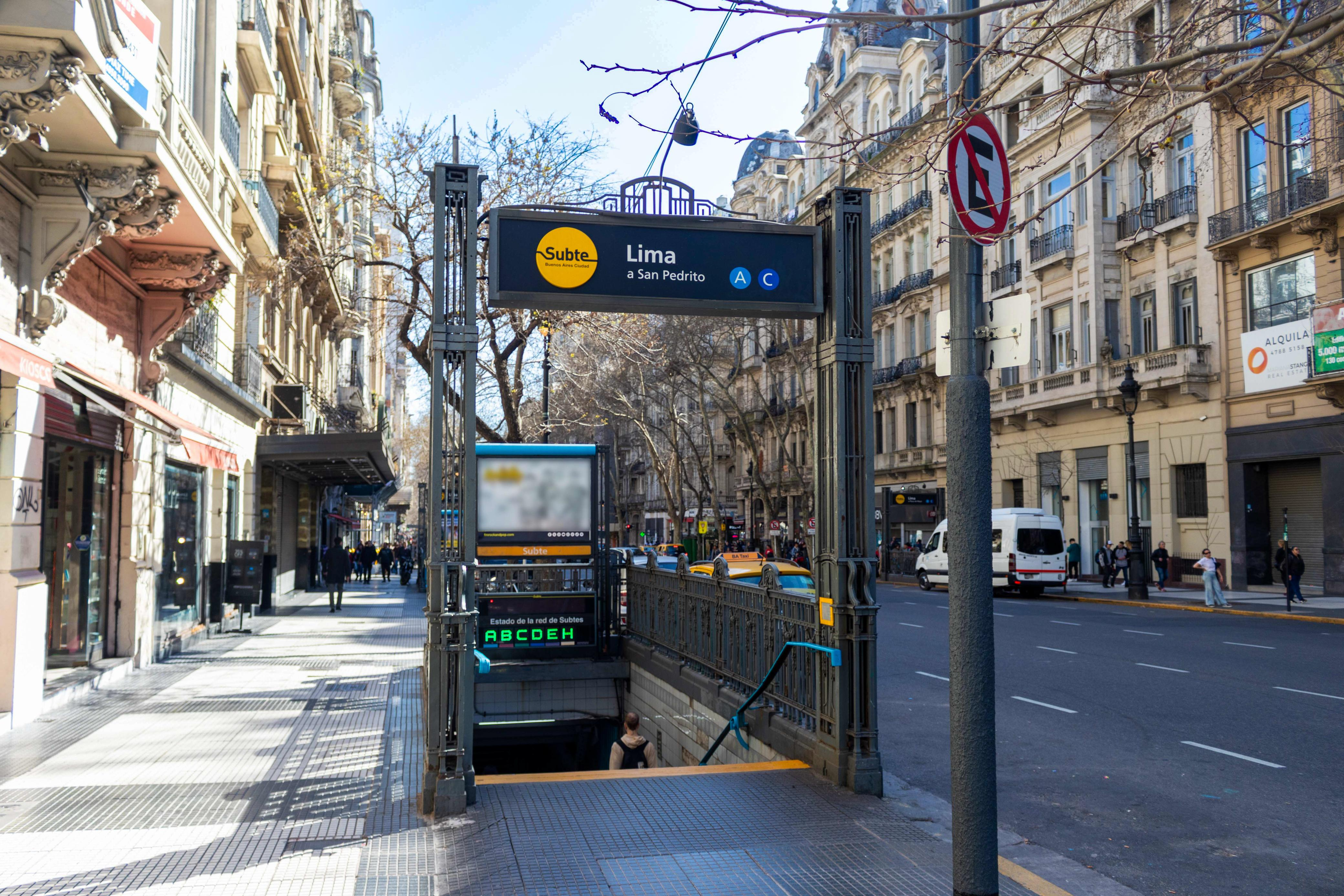
Buenos Aires is known as The Paris of South America.

The architecture of the second half of the 19th century continued to reproduce French neoclassic models, such as the headquarters of the Banco de la Nación Argentina built by Alejandro Bustillo, and the Museo Hispanoamericano de Buenos Aires of Martín Noel. However, since the 1930s, the influence of Le Corbusier and European rationalism consolidated in a group of young architects from the University of Tucumán, among whom Amancio Williams stands out. The construction of skyscrapers proliferated in Buenos Aires until the 1950s. Newer modern high-technology buildings by Argentine architects in the last years of the 20th century and the beginning of the 21st include the Le Parc Tower by Mario Álvarez, the Torre Fortabat by Sánchez Elía, and the Repsol-YPF Tower by César Pelli.

=== Theaters ===
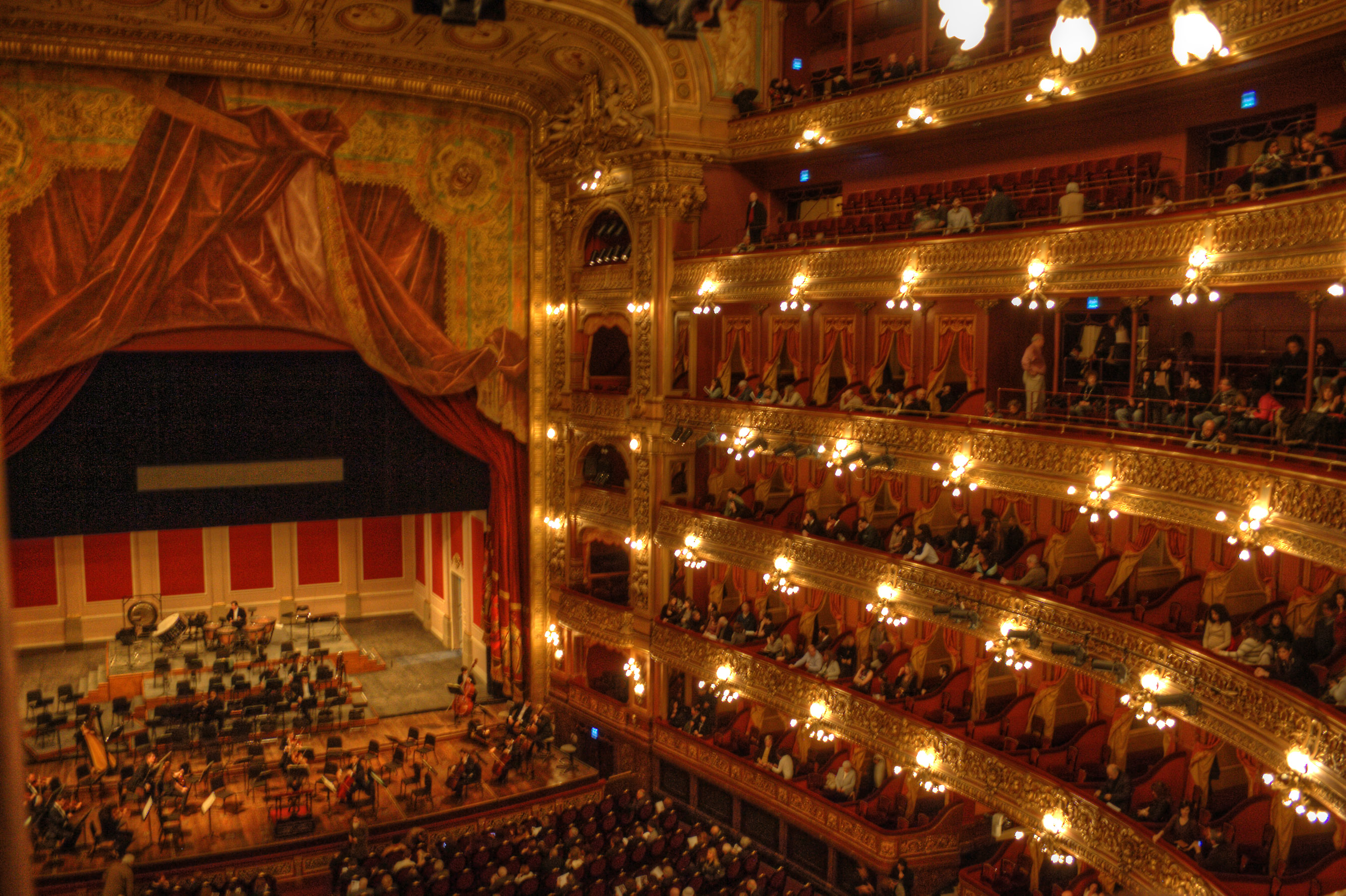
The Teatro Colón.

Buenos Aires has over 280 theaters, more than any other city in the world. Because of this, Buenos Aires is declared the "World's Capital of Theater". They show everything from musicals to ballet, comedy to circuses. Some of them are:

- Teatro Colón is ranked the third best opera house in the world by National Geographic, and is acoustically considered to be among the world's five best concert venues. It is bounded by the wide 9 de Julio Avenue (technically Cerrito Street), Arturo Toscanini Street, Tucumán Street, as well as Libertad Street at its main entrance. It is in the heart of the city on a site once occupied by Ferrocarril Oeste's Plaza Parque station.
- Cervantes Theater (Teatro Nacional Cervantes), located on Córdoba Avenue and two blocks north of Buenos Aires' renowned opera house, the Colón Theater, the Cervantes houses three performance halls, of which the María Guerrero Salon serves as its main hall. Its 456 m^{2} (4,910 ft^{2}) stage features a 12 m (39 ft) rotating circular platform and can be extended by a further 2.7 m (8.9 ft). The Guerrero Salon can seat 860 spectators, including 512 in the galleries. A secondary hall, the Orestes Caviglia Salon, can seat 150 and is mostly reserved for chamber music concerts. The Luisa Vehíl Salon is a multipurpose room known for its extensive gold leaf decor.
- Teatro Gran Rex opened on 8 July 1937 as the largest cinema in South America of its time; it is an Art Deco-style theater.
- Teatro Avenida (Avenida Theater) was inaugurated on Buenos Aires' central Avenida de Mayo in 1908 with a production of Spanish dramatist Lope de Vega's Justice Without Revenge. The production was directed by María Guerrero, a Spanish Argentine theater director who popularized classical drama in Argentina during the late 19th century and would establish the important Cervantes Theater (Teatro Nacional Cervantes) in 1921.

=== Sports ===
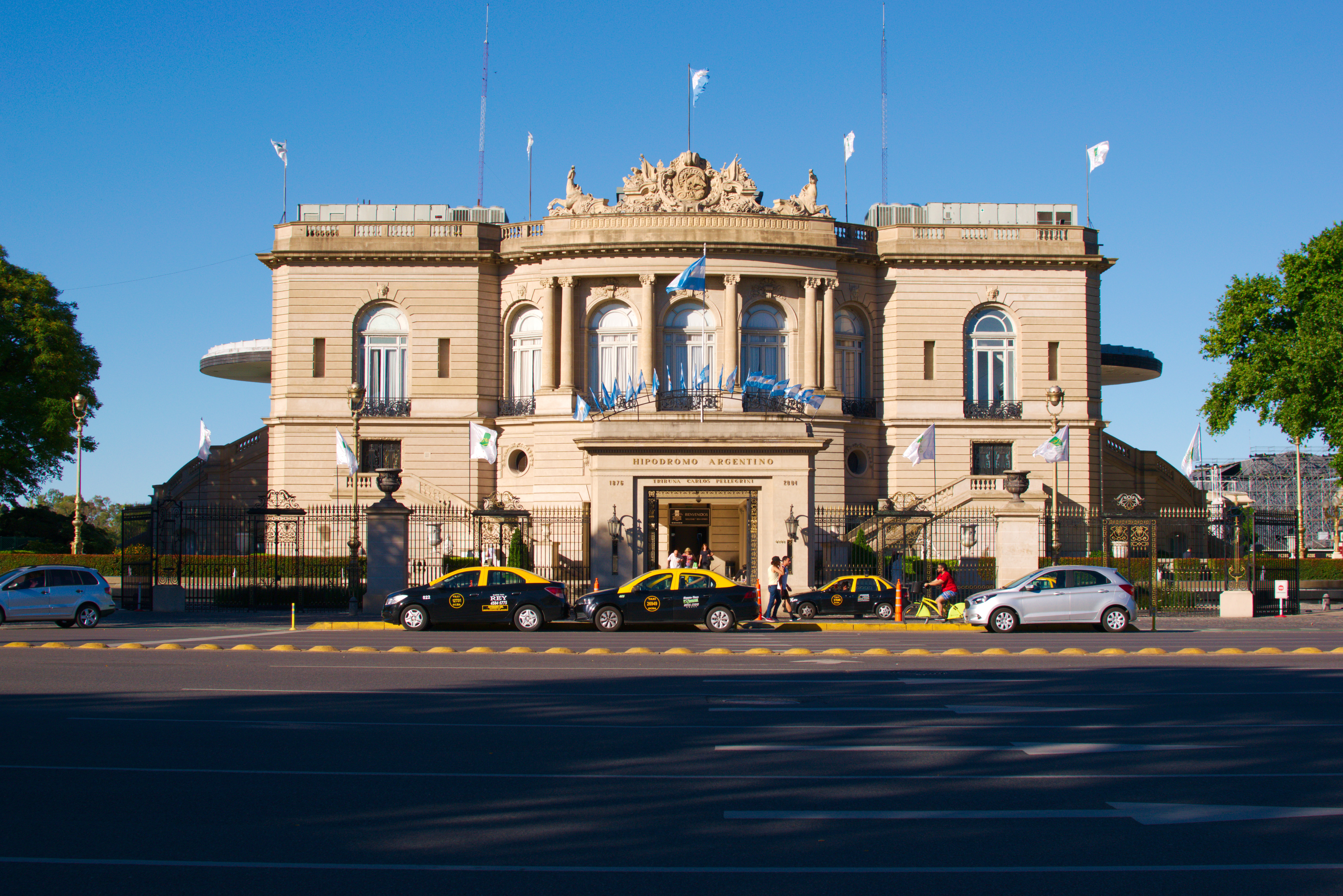
The Argentine Hippodrome of Palermo.

Buenos Aires has been a candidate city for the Summer Olympic Games on three occasions: for the 1956 Games, which were lost by a single vote to Melbourne; for the 1968 Summer Olympics, held in Mexico City; and in 2004, when the games were awarded to Athens. Buenos Aires hosted the first Pan American Games (1951) and was the host city to several World Championship events: the 1950 and 1990 Basketball World Championships, the 1982 and 2002 Men's Volleyball World Championships and, most remembered, the 1978 FIFA World Cup, won by Argentina on 25 June 1978, when it defeated the Netherlands at the Estadio Monumental 3–1.

In September 2013, the city hosted the 125th IOC Session, Tokyo was elected the host city of the 2020 Summer Olympics and Thomas Bach was new IOC President. Buenos Aires bid to host the 2018 Summer Youth Olympics. In July 2013, the IOC elected Buenos Aires as the host city. Buenos Aires hosted the 2006 South American Games.

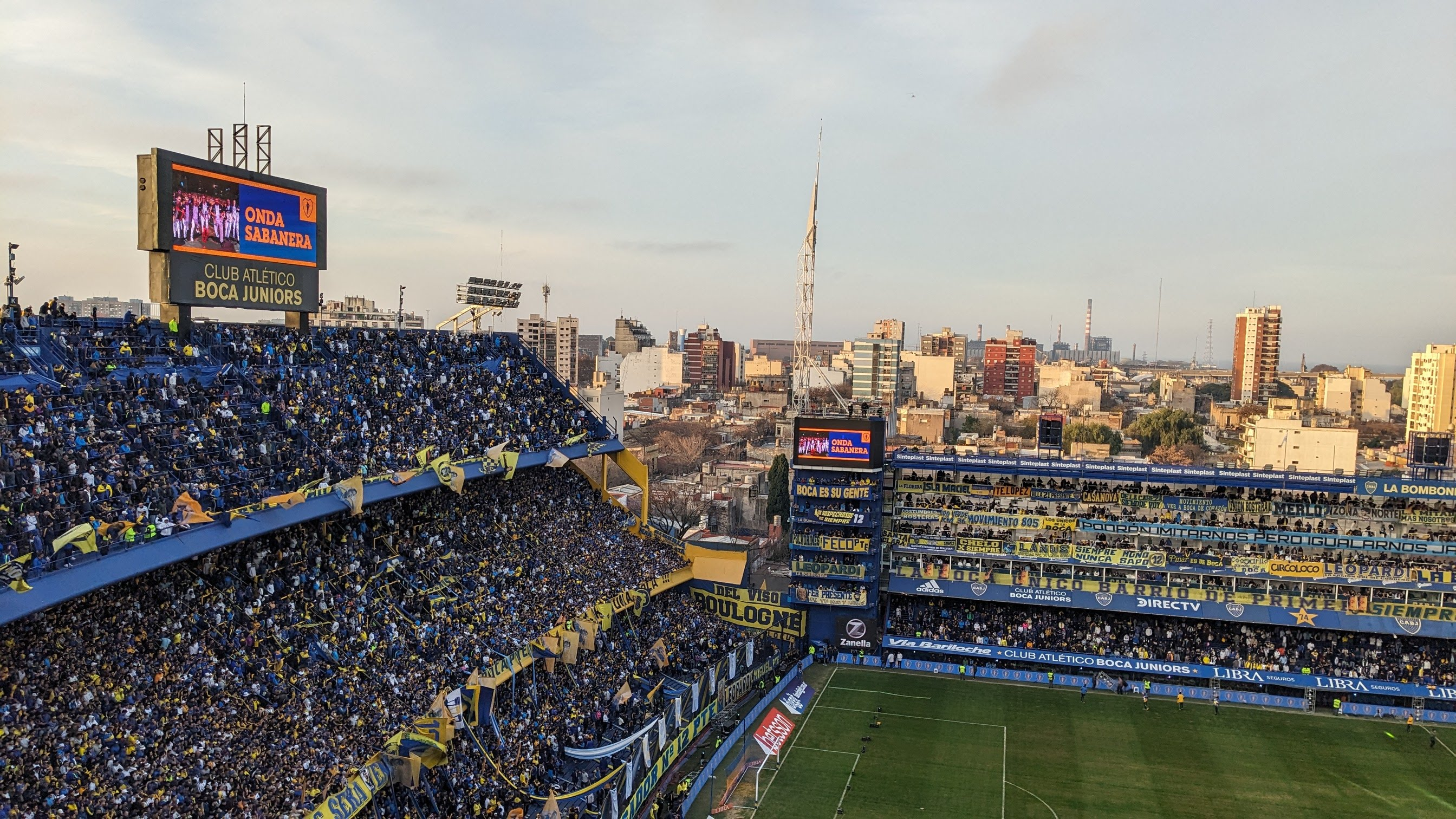
Boca Juniors' supporters at La Bombonera Stadium

Football is a popular pastime among many of the city's citizens, as Buenos Aires, featuring no fewer than 24 professional teams, has the highest concentration of teams of any city in the world. with many of its teams playing in the major league. The best-known rivalry is the one between Boca Juniors and River Plate, the match is better known as Superclásico. Watching a match between these two teams was deemed one of the "50 sporting things you must do before you die" by The Observer.

Other major clubs include San Lorenzo de Almagro, Club Atlético Huracán, Vélez Sarsfield, Chacarita Juniors, Club Ferro Carril Oeste, Nueva Chicago and Asociación Atlética Argentinos Juniors. Diego Maradona, born in Lanús Partido, a county south of Buenos Aires, is widely hailed as one of the sport's greatest players of all time. Maradona started his career with Argentinos Juniors and went on to play for Boca Juniors, the national football team and others (most notably FC Barcelona in Spain and SSC Napoli in Italy).

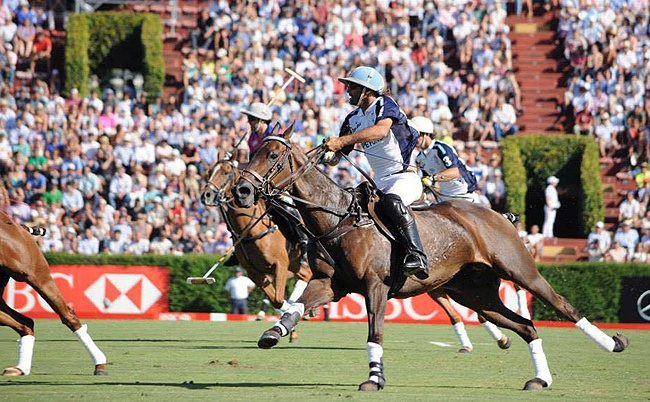
Campo Argentino de Polo, home of the Argentine Open Polo Championship, the most important global event of this discipline

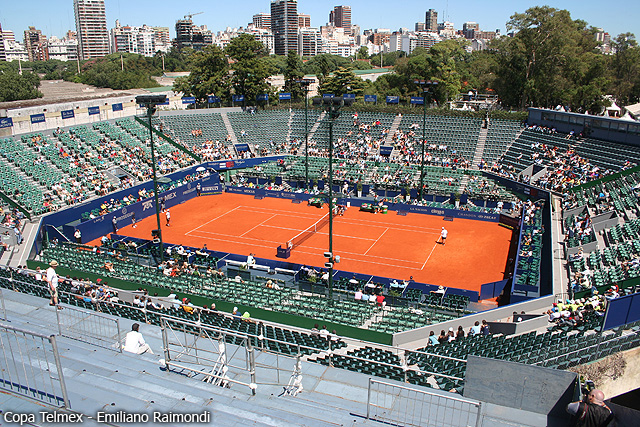
Buenos Aires Lawn Tennis Club

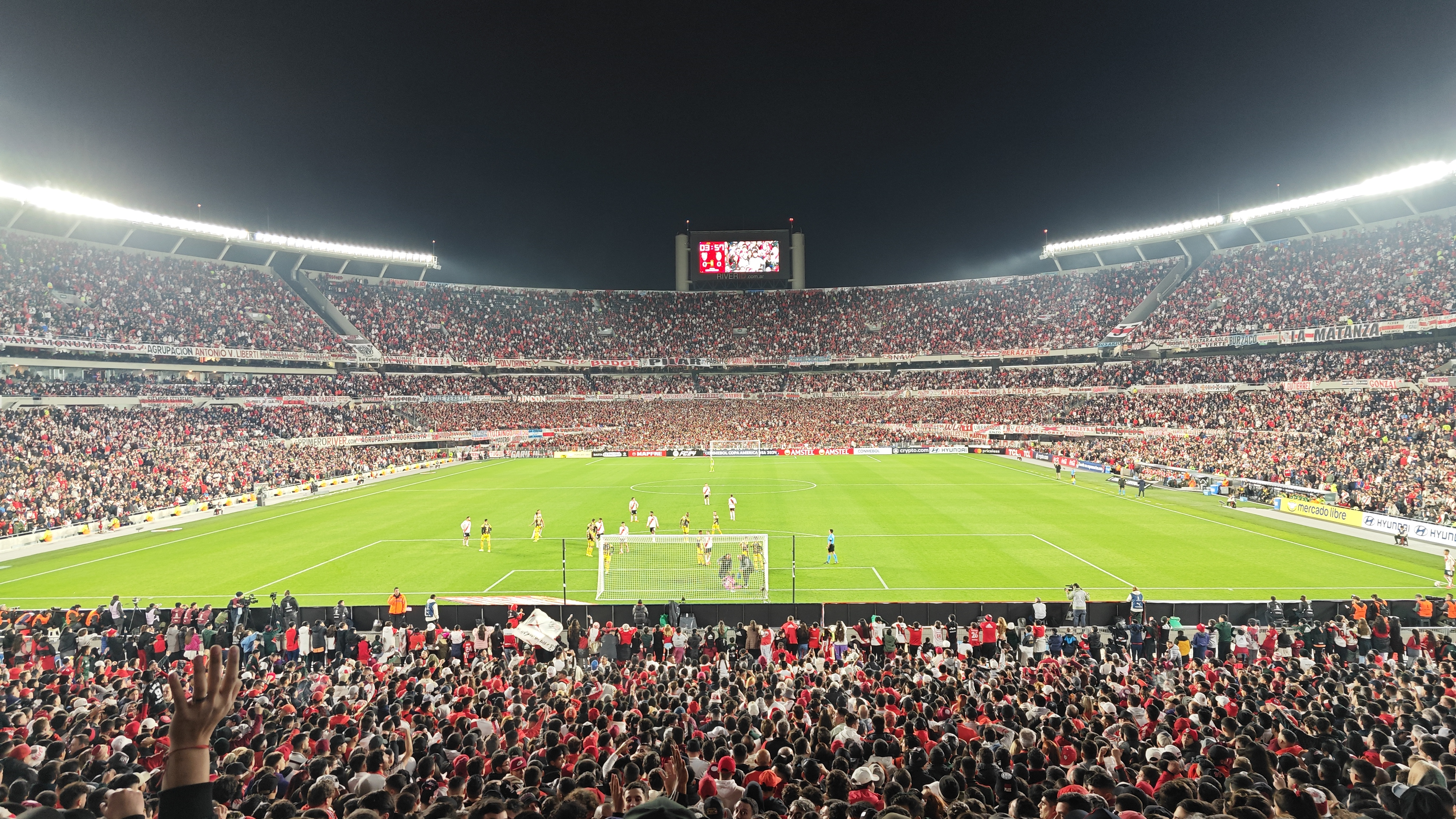
The Estadio Mâs Monumental hosted the 1978 FIFA World Cup final

In 1912, the practice of basketball in Argentina was started by the Asociación Cristiana de Jóvenes (YMCA) of Buenos Aires, when Canadian professor Paul Phillip was in charge of teaching basketball at the YMCA of Paseo Colón Avenue. The first basketball clubs in Argentina, Hindú and Independiente, were located at the YMCAs of the Greater Buenos Aires metropolitan area. By 1912 the first basketball games were held by YMCA headquarters in Buenos Aires. Nowadays, the Argentine Basketball Confederation is headquartered in Buenos Aires.

Argentina has been the home of world champions in professional boxing. Carlos Monzon was a hall of fame World Middleweight champion, and the former lineal Middleweight champion Sergio Martinez hails from Argentina. Omar Narvaez, Lucas Matthysse, Carolina Duer, and Marcos Maidana are five modern-day world champions as well.

Argentines' love for horses can be experienced in several ways: horse racing at the Hipódromo Argentino de Palermo racetrack, polo in the Campo Argentino de Polo (located just across Libertador Avenue from the Hipódromo), and pato, a kind of basketball played on horseback that was declared the national game in 1953. Polo was brought to the country in the second half of the 19th century by English immigrants.

The first rugby union match in Argentina was played in 1873 in the Buenos Aires Cricket Club Ground, located in the neighborhood of Palermo, where the Galileo Galilei planetarium is located today. Rugby enjoys widespread popularity in Buenos Aires, most especially in the north of the city, which boasts more than eighty rugby clubs. The city is home to the Argentine Super Rugby franchise, the Jaguares. The Argentina national rugby union team competes in Buenos Aires in international matches such as the Rugby Championship.

Buenos Aires native Guillermo Vilas (who was raised in Mar del Plata) and Gabriela Sabatini were great tennis players of the 1970s and 1980s and popularized tennis Nationwide in Argentina. Vilas won the ATP Buenos Aires numerous times in the 1970s. Other popular sports in Buenos Aires are golf, basketball, rugby and field hockey.

Juan Manuel Fangio won five Formula One World Driver's Championships, and was only outstripped by Michael Schumacher and Lewis Hamilton, with seven Championships. The Buenos Aires Oscar Gálvez car-racing track hosted 20 Formula One events as the Argentine Grand Prix, between 1953 and 1998; it was discontinued on financial grounds. The track features various local categories on most weekends. The 2009, 2010, 2011, 2015 Dakar Rally started and ended in the city.

Buenos Aires held the 1st FIBA World Championship in 1950 and 11th FIBA World Championship in 1990, the 1st Pan American Games in 1951, was the site of two venues in the 1978 FIFA World Cup and one in the 1982 FIVB Men's World Championship. Most recently, Buenos Aires had a venue in the 2001 FIFA World Youth Championship and in the 2002 FIVB Volleyball Men's World Championship, hosted the 125th IOC Session in 2013, the 2018 Summer Youth Olympics and the 2018 G20 summit.

== International relations ==
=== Twin towns and sister cities ===
Buenos Aires is twinned with the following cities:

- Athens, Greece (since 1992)
- Beijing, China (since 1993)
- Berlin, Germany (since 19 May 1994)
- Bilbao, Spain (since 1992)
- Brasília, Brazil (since 1986)
- Cairo, Egypt (since 1992)
- Cádiz, Spain (since 1975)
- Calabria, Italy (region) (since 1987)
- Guadix, Spain (since 1987)
- Kyiv, Ukraine (since 1993)
- Miami, Florida, United States (since 1978)
- Moscow, Russia (since 1990)
- Naples, Italy (since 1990)
- Osaka, Japan (since 1990)
- Oviedo, Spain (since 1983)
- Prague, Czech Republic (since 1992)
- Rotterdam, Netherlands (since 1990)
- São Paulo, Brazil (since 2007)
- Seoul, South Korea (since 1992)
- Seville, Spain (since 1974)
- Tel Aviv, Israel (since 1976)
- Toulouse, France (since 1990)
- Vigo, Spain (since 1992)
- Warsaw, Poland (since 1992)
- Yerevan, Armenia (since 2000)
- Zagreb, Croatia (since 1998)

=== Union of Ibero-American Capital Cities ===
Buenos Aires is part of the Union of Ibero-American Capital Cities from 12 October 1982 establishing brotherly relations with the following cities:

- Andorra la Vella, Andorra
- Asunción, Paraguay
- Bogotá, Colombia
- Caracas, Venezuela
- Guatemala City, Guatemala
- Havana, Cuba
- La Paz, Bolivia
- Lima, Peru
- Lisbon, Portugal
- Madrid, Spain
- Managua, Nicaragua
- Mexico City, Mexico
- Montevideo, Uruguay
- Panama City, Panama
- Quito, Ecuador
- Rio de Janeiro, Brazil
- San José, Costa Rica
- San Juan, Puerto Rico, United States
- San Salvador, El Salvador
- Santiago, Chile
- Santo Domingo, Dominican Republic
- Tegucigalpa, Honduras

=== Partner cities ===
- Beirut, Lebanon
- Budapest, Hungary
- Cape Town, South Africa
- Hanoi, Vietnam
- Jerusalem, Israel
- Lisbon, Portugal
- Lugano, Switzerland
- Ottawa, Canada
- Paris, France
- Rome, Italy
- Saint Petersburg, Russia
- Santiago de Compostela, Spain

== See also ==
- C40 Cities Climate Leadership Group
- Cicerones de Buenos Aires
- Largest cities in the Americas
- List of mayors and chiefs of government of Buenos Aires
- List of twin towns and sister cities of Buenos Aires
- OPENCities
- Outline of Argentina
