= Dacia Duster =

Subcompact crossover SUV/Pick-up truck by Dacia

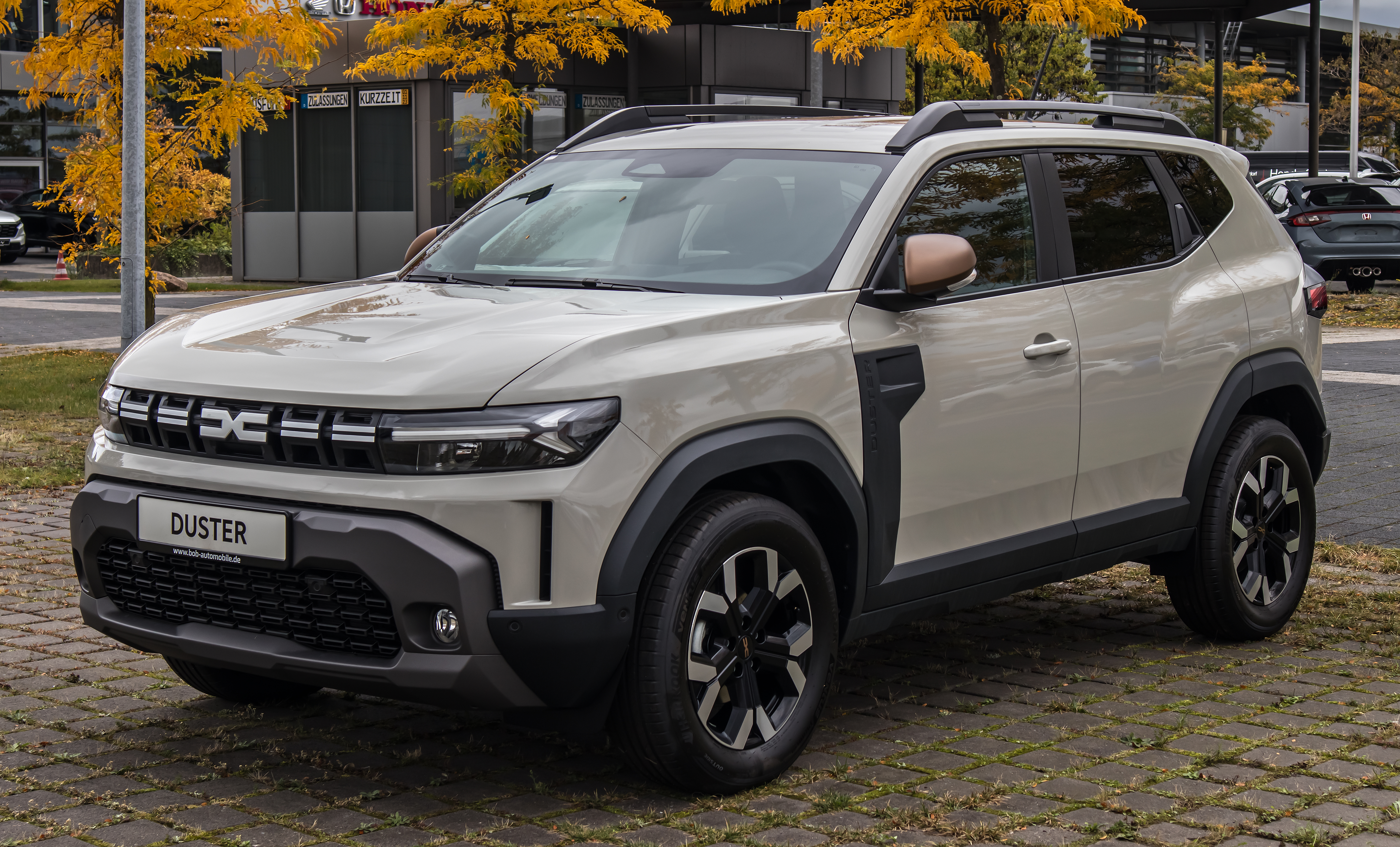
- 2024 Dacia Duster

Overview
- Manufacturer: Dacia (Renault)
- Also called: Renault Duster
- Production: 2010–present

Body and chassis
- Class: Subcompact SUV; Compact pickup truck
- Body style: 5-door crossover SUV; 2-door pickup 4-door pickup
- Layout: Front-engine, front-wheel-drive Front-engine, all-wheel-drive

The Dacia Duster is a family of subcompact crossovers produced and marketed jointly by the French manufacturer Renault and its Romanian subsidiary Dacia since 2010, currently in its third generation. It is marketed as the Renault Duster in certain markets such as Latin America, Russia, Ukraine, Asia, the Middle East, South Africa, Australia and New Zealand. The first generation was rebadged and restyled as the Nissan Terrano in CIS countries and India. It was introduced in March 2010, and is the third model of the Dacia brand based on the Logan platform, after the Sandero.

The four-door double cab pick-up was launched at the end of 2015 in South America, marketed as the Renault Duster Oroch, while the single cab Dacia Duster Pick-Up was introduced in 2020.

Renault Duster is by far the most popular car among Ukrainian law enforcement agencies and other government bodies, with some 1500 of those procured in 2024 alone.

== First generation (HS; 2010) ==
First generation
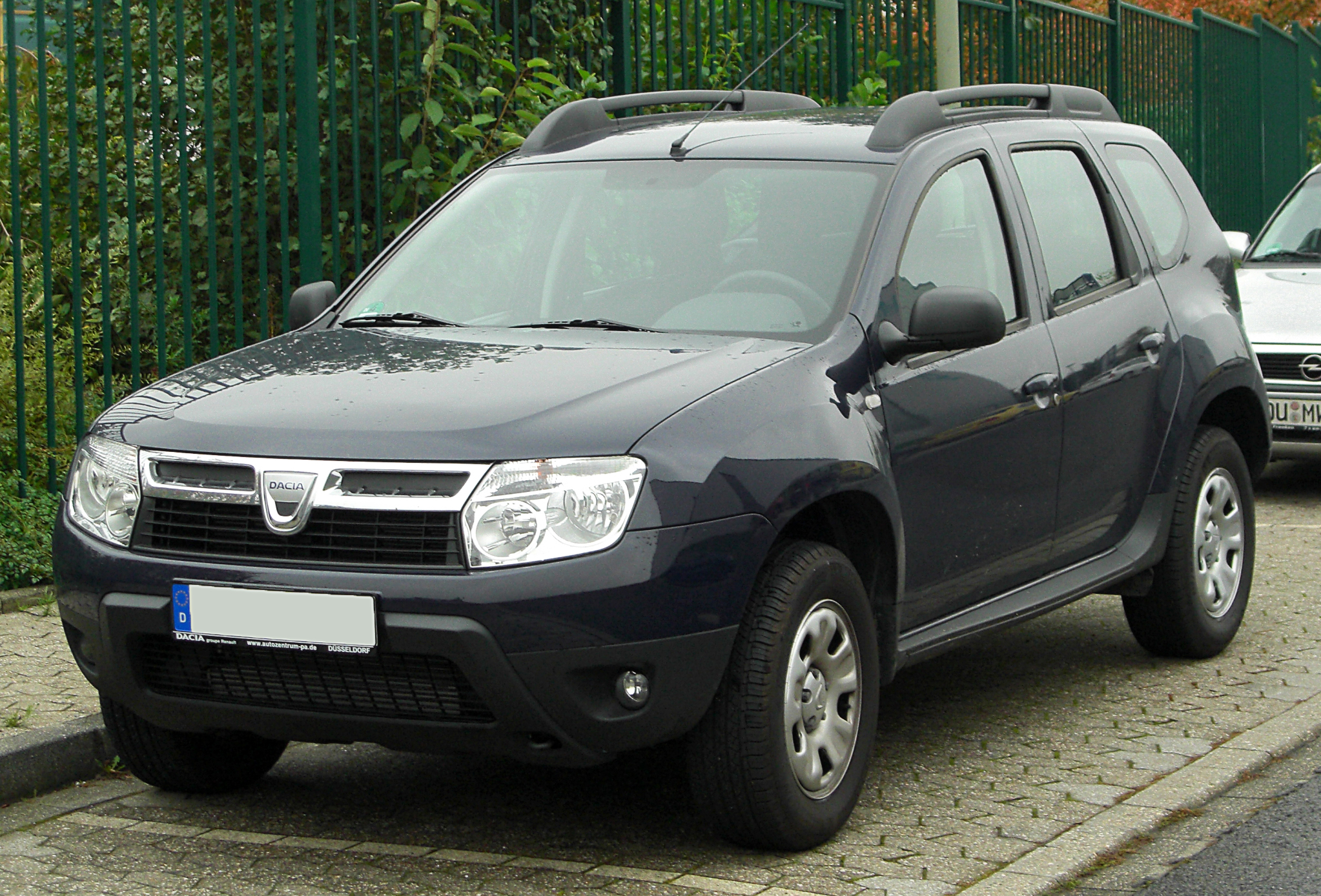
- Dacia Duster pre-facelift

Overview
- Model code: HS
- Also called: Renault Duster; Nissan Terrano (India and Russia)
- Production: 2010–2017; 2012–2020 (Brazil); 2012–2021 (Colombia); 2011–2021 (Russia); 2012–2022 (India)
- Assembly: Romania: Mioveni; Brazil: São José dos Pinhais (Renault Brazil); Colombia: Envigado (SOFASA); Russia: Moscow (Avtoframos/Renault Russia); India: Chennai (Renault Nissan India); Indonesia: East Jakarta (National Assemblers)
- Designer: Renault Design Central Europe; Erde Tungaa (exterior)

Body and chassis
- Body style: 5-door crossover SUV; 4-door pick-up
- Platform: Dacia B0 platform
- Related: Dacia Logan; Dacia Sandero; Renault Duster Oroch; Renault Captur/Kaptur (HA); Nissan Kicks (D15)

Powertrain
- Engine: Petrol: 1.2 L H5Ft I4 turbo; 1.3 L H5Ht I4 turbo; 1.5 L H4K I4; 1.6 L K4M I4; 1.6 L K4M I4 (ethanol); 1.6 L K4M I4 (LPG); 2.0 L F4R I4; 2.0 L F4R I4 (ethanol); Diesel: 1.5 L K9K I4 turbo
- Transmission: 5-speed manual 6-speed manual 4-speed automatic 6-speed automated manual 6-speed EDC; CVT

Dimensions
- Wheelbase: 2,673 mm (105.2 in)
- Length: 4,315 mm (169.9 in)
- Width: 1,822 mm (71.7 in)
- Height: 1,630–1,690 mm (64.2–66.5 in)
- Curb weight: 1,160–1,294 kg (2,557–2,853 lb)

Chronology
- Successor: Nissan Kicks (D15) (for Terrano, India)

=== Design ===
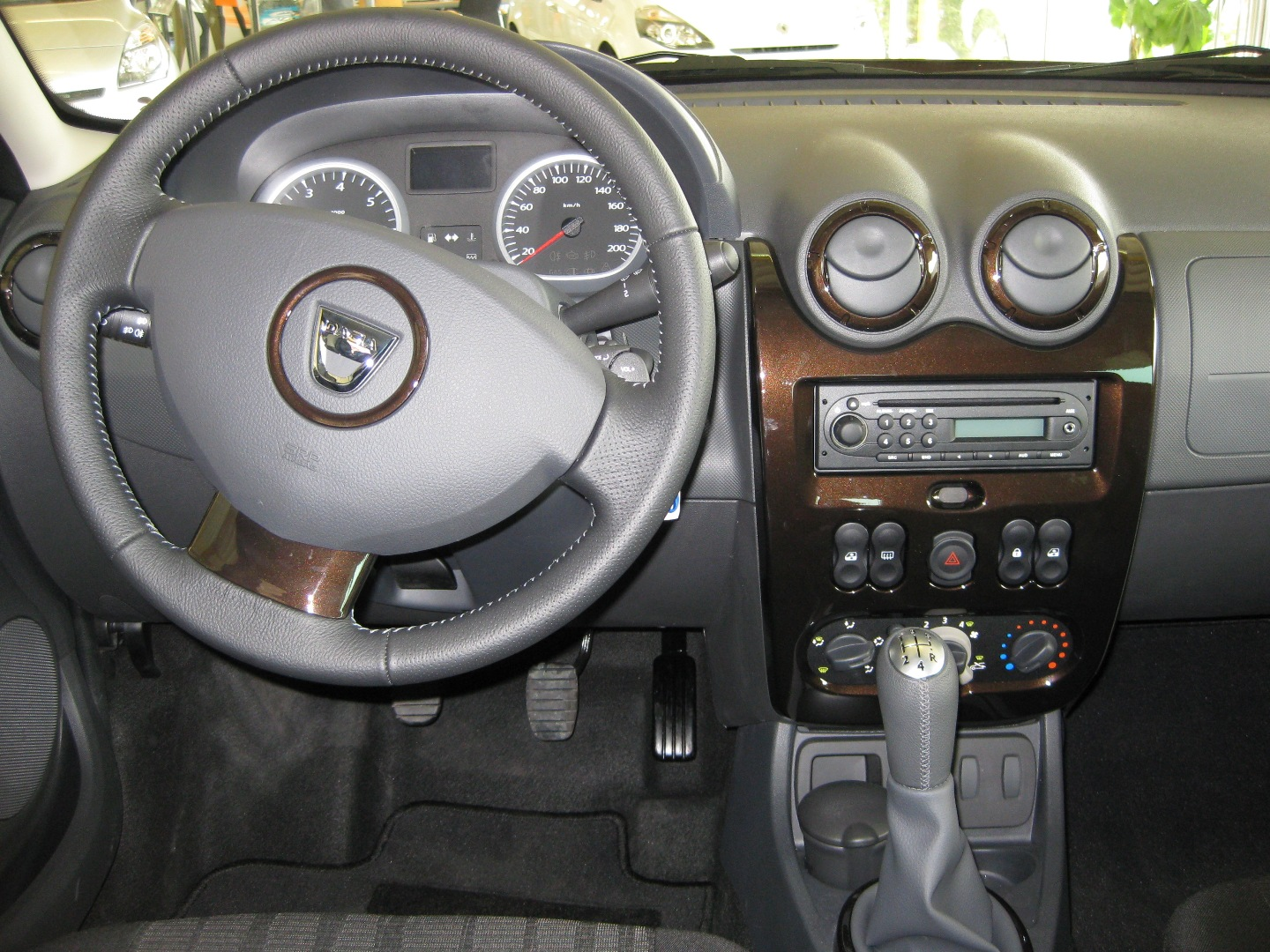
Interior

The Duster was initially introduced in the ice racing version prepared for the Andros Trophy, presented for the first time on 17 November 2009. The production version was revealed to the media on 8 December 2009, and was subsequently launched at the Geneva Motor Show in March 2010.

Based on the B0 platform, the Duster measures 4.31 metres (169.7 in) in length, 1.82 metres (71.7 in) in width and has 210 mm (8.3 in) of ground clearance. Its luggage space has a volume of up to 475 litres (16.8 cu ft), while with the rear bench seat folded and tipped forward, its carrying ability can exceed 1,600 litres (57 cu ft).

The first-generation Duster was offered with two-wheel drive or four-wheel-drive. The 4x4 variants make use of Nissan's all-wheel drive system, which allows the driver to choose from three different driving modes: Auto, in which the rear-wheel drive is engaged automatically in case the front wheels lose grip, Lock, the rear axle spins at the same speed as the front, and 2WD where the transmission is locked into front-wheel drive for maximum fuel efficiency.

The Renault 4 had some influence on the Duster's design.

=== Facelift ===
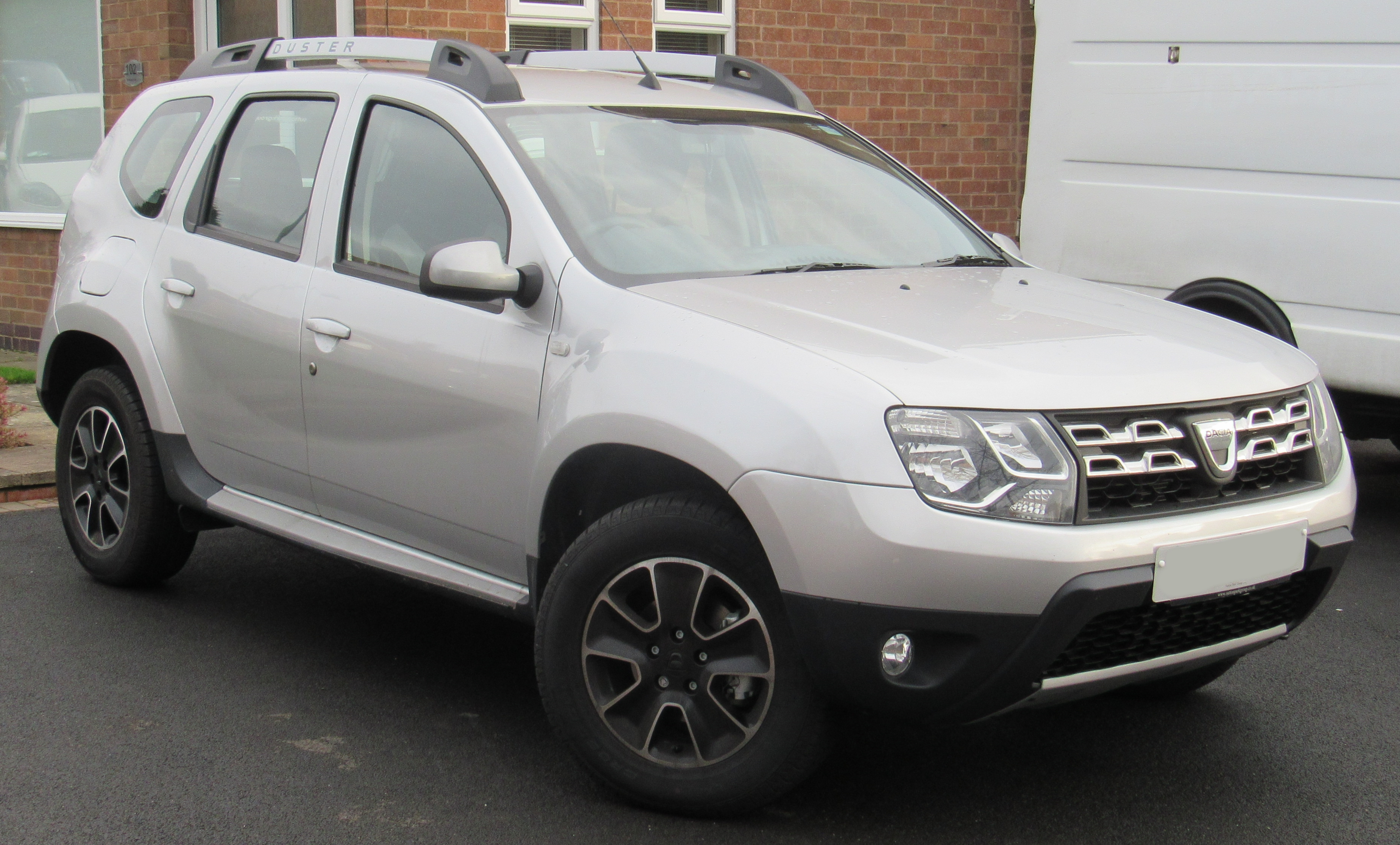
Facelift

In September 2013, the facelifted Dacia Duster was presented at the Frankfurt Motor Show. The exterior received important changes in the front with a new chromed grille and redesigned headlights, restyled roof bars, new 16-inch wheels and modest modifications in the rear. The interior was also renewed, with design and features similar to those introduced the previous year on the new models in the Dacia line-up. A new TCe 125 1.2-litre direct-injection turbo engine was introduced.

In 2016, the Duster received a new steering wheel and a Blackshadow trim.

=== Safety ===
Euro NCAP test results* Dacia Duster (2011)
Test	Points	%
Overall:	3 /5 stars	
Adult occupant:	27	74%
Child occupant:	38	78%
Pedestrian:	10	28%
Safety assist:	2	29%

The Dacia Duster features Bosch 8.1 ABS, as well as electronic brakeforce distribution (EBD) and emergency brake assist (EBA). It also features electronic stability control (ESC) as an option on certain versions, as well as understeer control (CSV) and traction control (ASR). This option also allows torque to be transferred away from a spinning wheel in 4x4 mode to improve traction when diagonal wheel spin occurs.

On the passive safety front, the Dacia Duster comes as standard with two front airbags (depending on market) and three-point seat belts with load limiters for the front seats. Depending on version, two lateral head/thorax airbags are fitted in addition to the driver and passenger front airbags to provide additional protection in the case of side impact. The pyrotechnic pretensioners for the front seats (depending on version) complete Dacia Duster's retention system.

The Duster for India with no airbags and no ABS received 0 stars for adult occupants and 2 stars for toddlers from Global NCAP 1.0 in 2017.

The Duster for India with driver airbag and no ABS received 3 stars for adult occupants and 2 stars for toddlers from Global NCAP 1.0 in 2017 (similar to Latin NCAP 2013).

The Duster in its most basic Latin American market configuration with 1 airbag and no ABS received 4 stars for adult occupants and 2 stars for toddlers from Latin NCAP 1.0 in 2015.

Latin NCAP 1.5 test results Renault Duster + 1 Airbag (2015, similar to Euro NCAP 2002)
Test	Points	Stars
Adult occupant:	11.00/17.0	4 /5 stars
Child occupant:	21.37/49.00	2 /5 stars

In 2011, the Duster in its standard European market configuration was tested by the Euro NCAP, receiving a three-star rating. It was awarded 27 points (74%) for the adult occupant protection, 38 points (78%) for the child occupant protection, 10 points (28%) for the pedestrian protection and two points (29%) for the safety assist features. In the latter category, the rating was influenced by the lack of the speed limiter and the fact that the electronic stability control was available only as an option.

=== Engines ===
Name	Code	Capacity	Configuration	Power	Torque	Top speed
Petrol
1.2 TCe 125	H5Ft	1,197 cc (73.0 cu in)	I4 DOHC Turbo	92 kW (125 PS; 123 hp) at 5250 rpm	205 N⋅m (151 lb⋅ft) at 2000 rpm	175 km/h (109 mph)
1.3 TCe	H5Ht	1,332 cc (81.3 cu in)	I4 DOHC Turbo	116 kW (158 PS; 156 hp)	254 N⋅m (187 lb⋅ft)	N/A
1.5 16V	H4K	1,498 cc (91.4 cu in)	I4 DOHC	78 kW (106 PS; 105 hp) at 5600 rpm	142 N⋅m (105 lb⋅ft) at 4000 rpm	160 km/h (99 mph)
1.6 16V 105	K4M 690	1,598 cc (97.5 cu in)	I4 DOHC	77 kW (105 PS; 103 hp) at 5750 rpm	148 N⋅m (109 lb⋅ft) at 3750 rpm	164 km/h (102 mph)
1.6 16V Ethanol	K4M Hi-Flex	1,598 cc (97.5 cu in)	I4 DOHC	84 kW (114 PS; 113 hp) at 5750 rpm	152 N⋅m (112 lb⋅ft) at 3750 rpm	165 km/h (103 mph)
1.6 16V LPG	K4M Bi-fuel	1,598 cc (97.5 cu in)	I4 DOHC	75 kW (102 PS; 101 hp) at 5750 rpm	144 N⋅m (106 lb⋅ft) at 3750 rpm	162 km/h (101 mph)
1.6 16V 105	K4M 606	1,598 cc (97.5 cu in)	I4 DOHC	77 kW (105 PS; 103 hp) at 5750 rpm	148 N⋅m (109 lb⋅ft) at 3750 rpm	160 km/h (99 mph)
2.0 16V	F4R	1,998 cc (122 cu in)	I4 DOHC	99 kW (135 PS; 133 hp) at 5500 rpm	195 N⋅m (144 lb⋅ft) at 3750 rpm	177 km/h (110 mph)
2.0 16V Ethanol	F4R Hi-Flex	1,998 cc (122 cu in)	I4 DOHC	104 kW (141 PS; 139 hp) at 5500 rpm	205 N⋅m (151 lb⋅ft) at 3750 rpm	180 km/h (112 mph)
Diesel
1.5 dCi 85	K9K 796	1,461 cc (89.2 cu in)	I4 SOHC Turbodiesel	63 kW (86 PS; 84 hp) at 4000 rpm	200 N⋅m (148 lb⋅ft) at 1900 rpm	156 km/h (97 mph)
1.5 dCi 110	K9K 896	1,461 cc (89.2 cu in)	I4 SOHC Turbodiesel	79 kW (107 PS; 106 hp) at 4000 rpm	240 N⋅m (177 lb⋅ft) at 1750 rpm	171 km/h (106 mph)
1.5 dCi 110	K9K 896	1,461 cc (89.2 cu in)	I4 SOHC Turbodiesel	81 kW (110 PS; 109 hp) at 4000 rpm	240 N⋅m (177 lb⋅ft) at 1750 rpm	168 km/h (104 mph)

=== Marketing and production ===
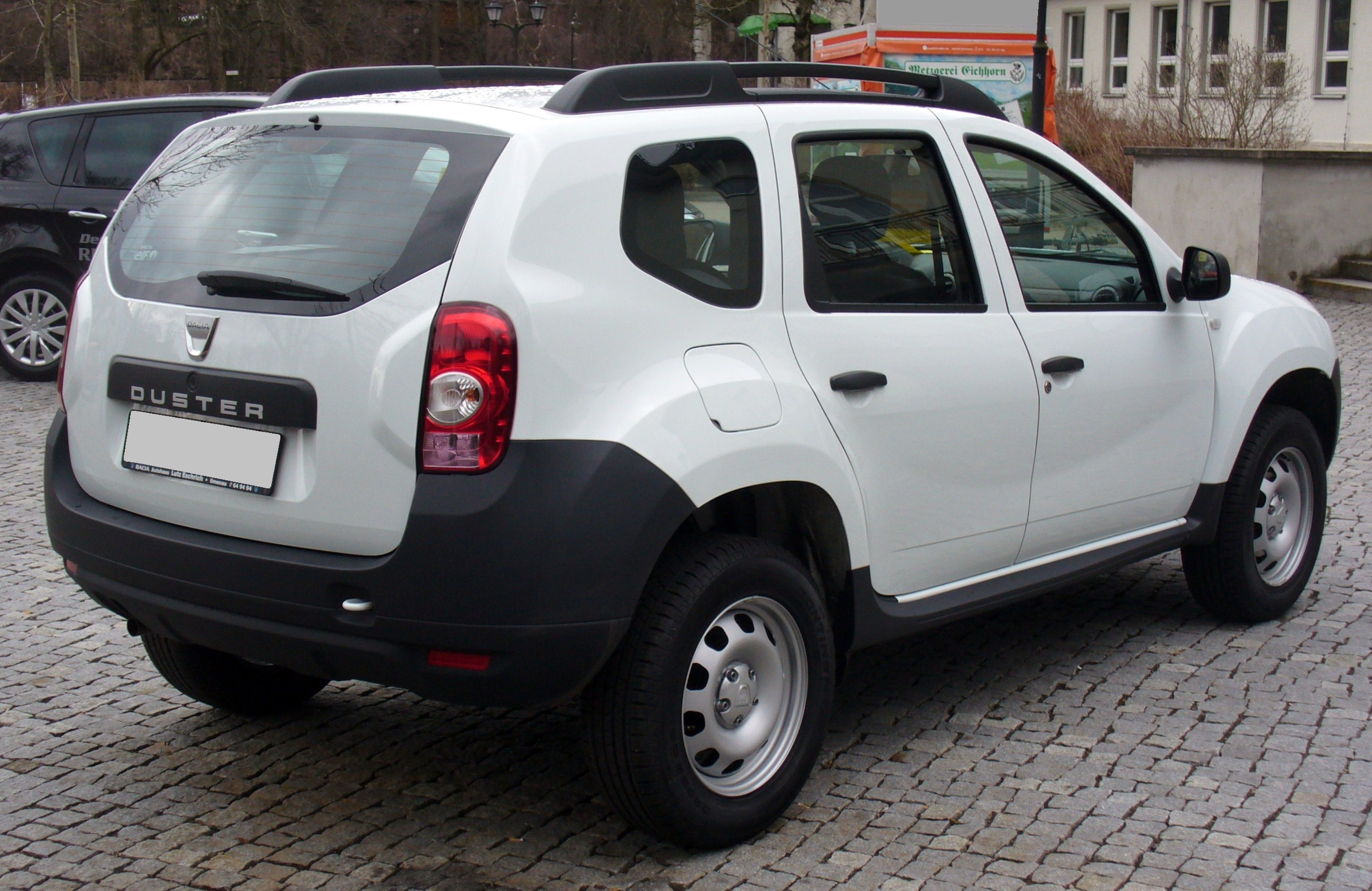
Dacia Duster Ambiance (Europe; pre-facelift)

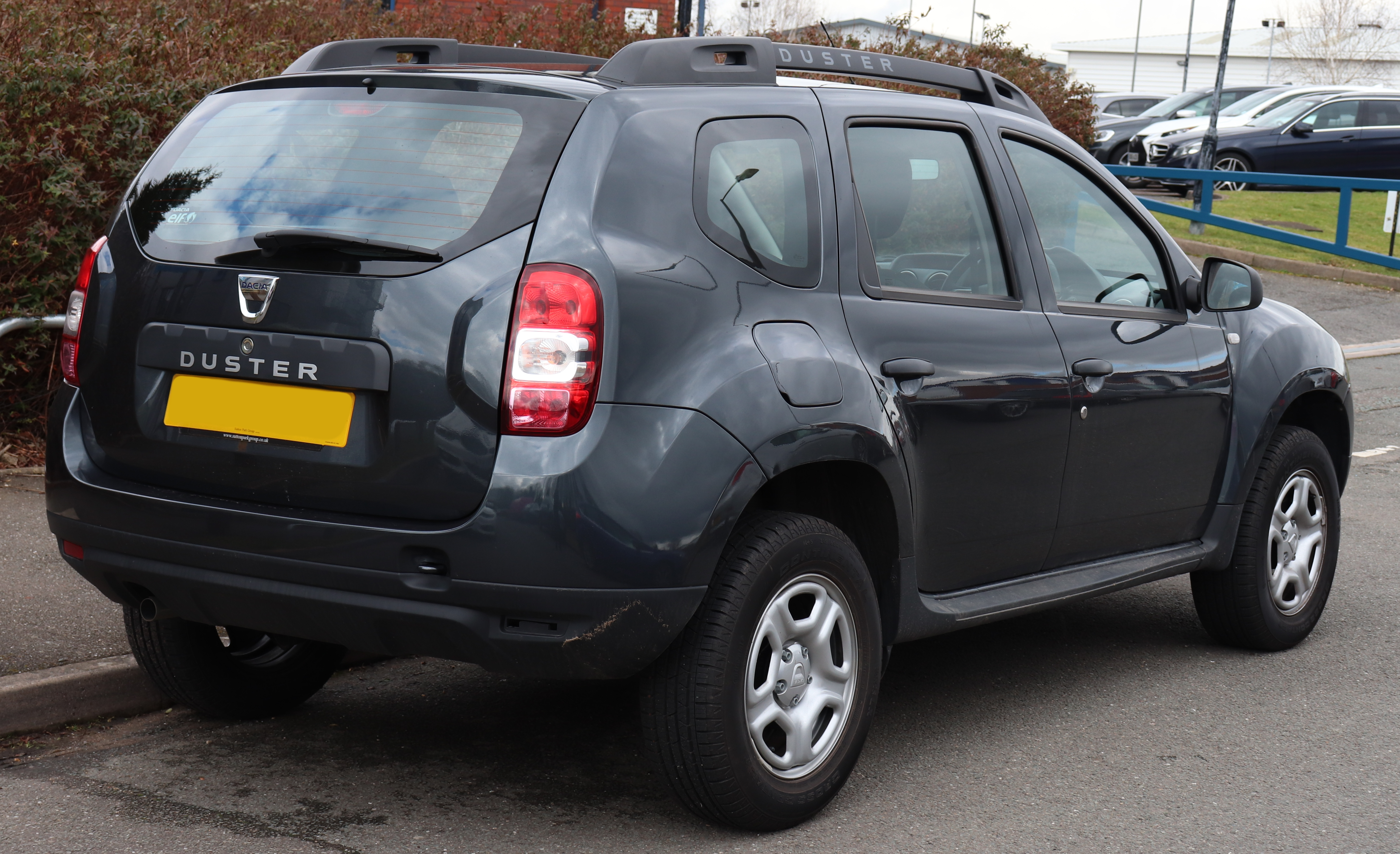
Facelift Dacia Duster (UK)

The first-generation Dacia Duster was offered in Europe, Turkey, Algeria and Morocco from March 2010, with prices starting from €11,900 (or €10,500 in Romanian domestic market) for the two-wheel drive version, and from €13,900 (or €11,500 in Romanian domestic market) for the 4x4 version. From June 2010, the Duster was also available in Ukraine, Jordan, Syria, Saudi Arabia, Egypt and Lebanon and in some African countries rebadged as a Renault, while in 2011, it is sold in the Persian Gulf States.

In 2014, 40% of the Duster units sold worldwide were badged as Dacia and 60% (70% in 2013) as Renault.

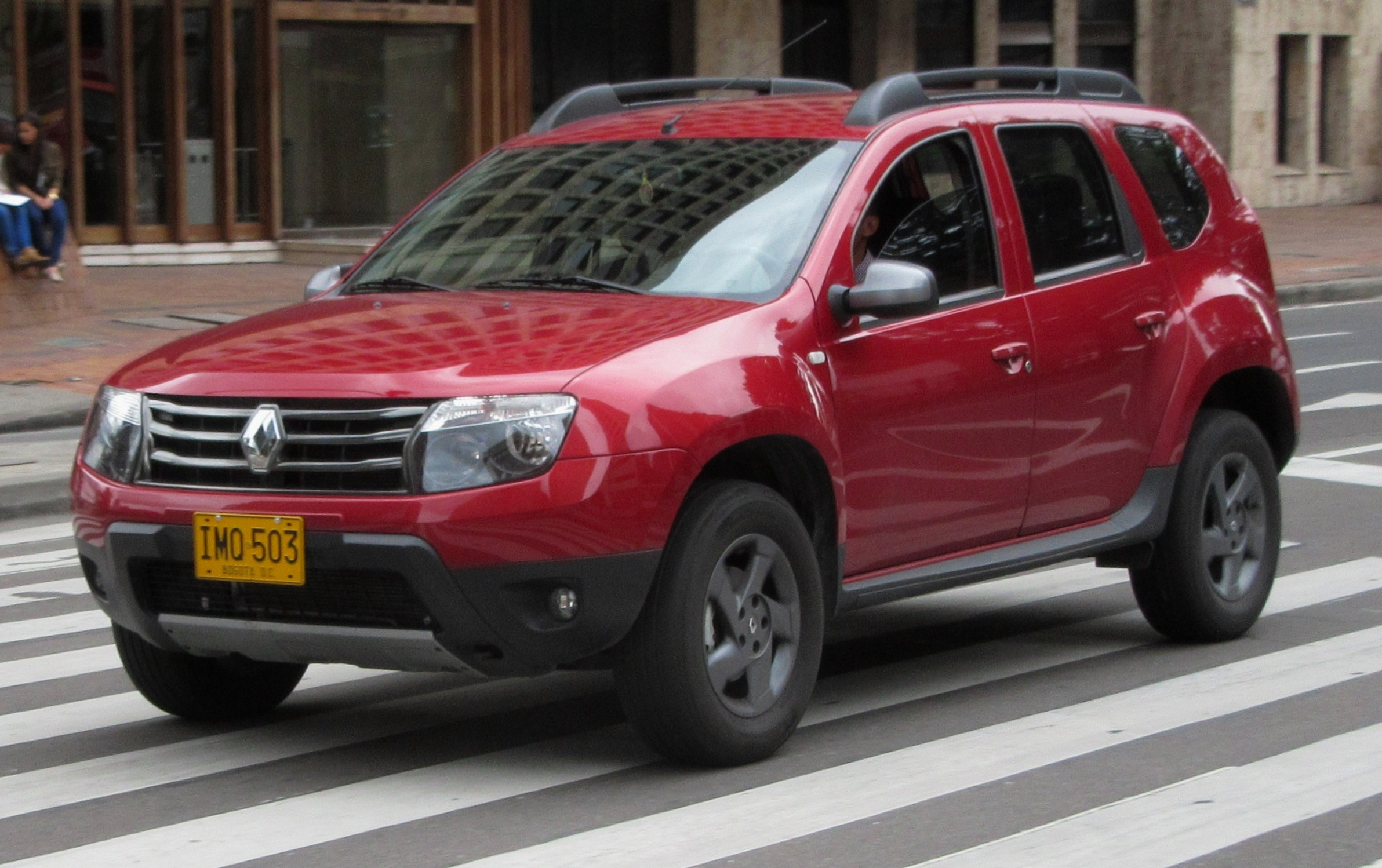
Renault Duster (Colombia)

In June 2011, Renault revealed the Duster in South America at the Buenos Aires Motor Show. It will be produced at its Curitiba plant in Brazil for distribution in Brazil, Argentina, and Chile, and at the Sofasa plant in Colombia, to be sold in Mexico and Ecuador with marketing planned to start in the last quarter of 2011.

The first-generation Duster was manufactured at the Avtoframos plant in Moscow, Russia with about 80,000 annual quantities, being available since 1 March 2012 with prices starting from about $14,400 and reaching 200,000 sales in 2.5 years. In June 2015, an updated version of the Duster was launched in Russia with some improved engines and features.

The Dacia brand was launched in 2012 in the UK. The Duster was named "Scottish Car of the year", "SUV of the year" and "Budget car of the year" by the Association of Scottish Motoring Writers. In 2012, the Duster was also introduced in Ireland.

Since 2011, the flexi-fuel (ethanol) version was available in several Western European countries, while the Bi-Fuel (LPG) version, an OEM Landi Renzo, was offered in Eastern Europe, Italy, Germany, Poland, Spain and the Netherlands. As of January 2013, the Bi-Fuel version was also available in France. The Bi-Fuel (LPG) version has proved to be very popular in Poland. Since the Duster's K4M engine has hydraulic lifters, the LPG version needs no regular valve adjustments. As of 2014, the United Kingdom, Ireland, Belgium, Romania and Luxembourg are the only countries in the European Union where the LPG version was not offered by Dacia.

==== UK ====
The Dacia Duster was launched in the UK in 2012, and has received several awards since, including: 2012 Top Gear Bargain of the Year, 2012 Scottish Car of the Year, and 2014 Carbuyer.co.uk Best Small SUV.

The Duster was Dacia's best selling vehicle in the UK, with 20,000 sales as of 2016, from the 70,000 total Dacia sales in the same period.

==== Russia ====
The Duster was introduced in Russia in 2012, as Renault Duster. Its off-road capabilities for the relatively modest price have made Duster very popular. Initial strong demand has caused preorder waiting times of up to 18 months. In the first half of 2013, Renault Duster sold 40710 units, making it the 4th best-selling car model in Russia overall. The Duster was adapted to Russian consumers' expectations with for example the Renault Start innovative system of remote engine start, useful during the cold days to heat the car's body and engine, which decreases polluting emissions. In June 2015, a renewed version of the Duster was launched in Russia with a new range of more powerful and low-consumption engines, an automatic gearbox, some new options, new interior ergonomics and materials of interior trim, and a new exterior design.

==== India ====
Renault launched the Duster on 4 July 2012 in India, with various modifications for the Indian market. The suspension and the underside of the car were strengthened to increase the car's off-roading suitability. Renault India also launched the all-wheel drive (AWD) version of Duster in 2014. The all-wheel drive feature of the SUV can be controlled via a toggle switch that has three options to choose from – two-wheel drive, automatic, and four-wheel drive, which can be manually locked. The AWD version was discontinued in 2020.

In April 2019, Renault India had confirmed that the second-generation Renault Duster will not be coming to India, which meant the first-generation Duster production was extended up until the third-generation Duster launch scheduled for 2026. Renault India launched a second facelift for the car, featuring an updated bumper and grille design that slightly mimics the second-generation Duster, including a hood cutout to accommodate the Renault logo, reflecting Renault's design language. It was offered with a 1.5 L K9K diesel engine until April 2020, when it was discontinued due to the implementation of Bharat Stage 6 emission standards. Renault ended production of the Duster in February 2022.

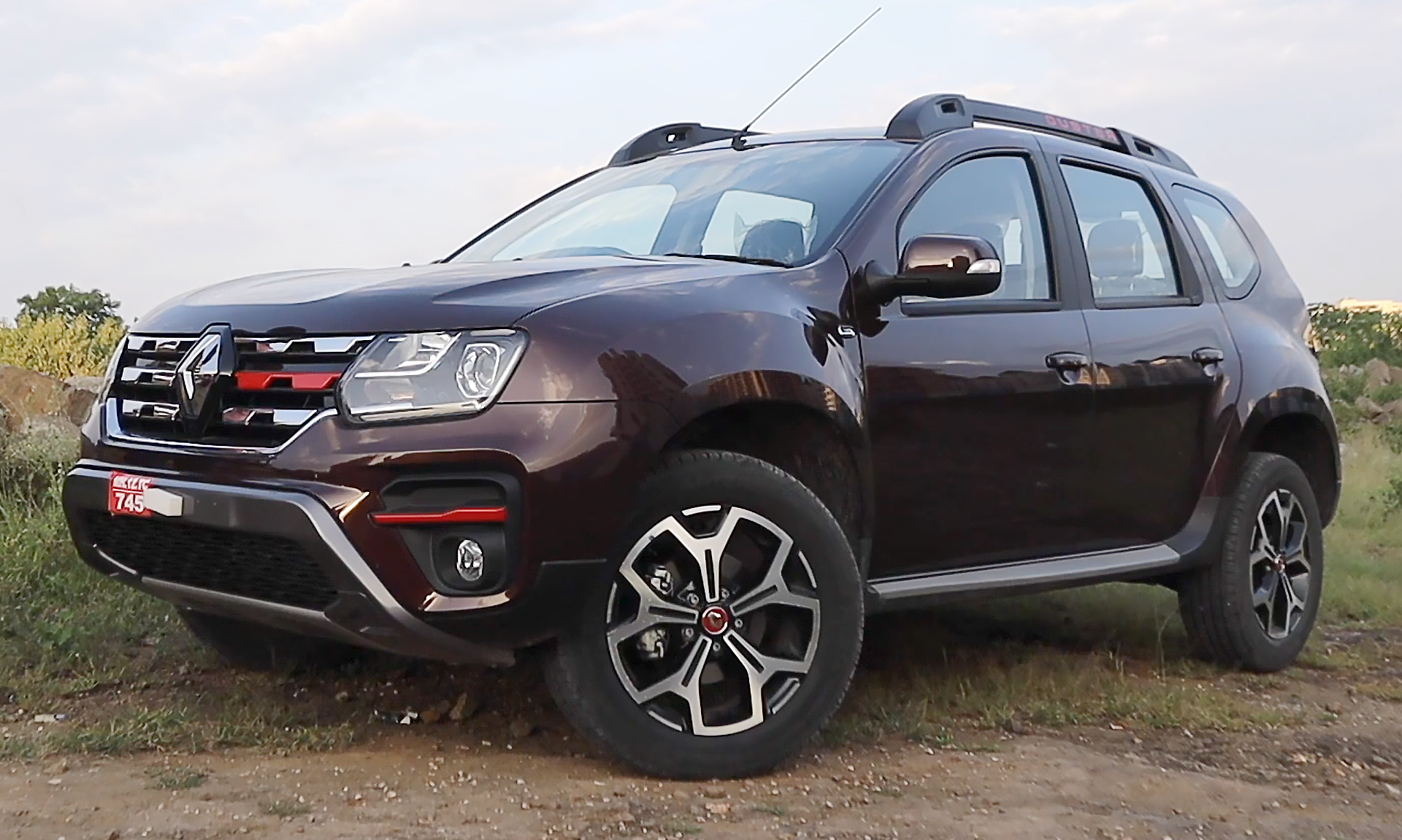
2020 Renault Duster RXZ (India, second facelift)

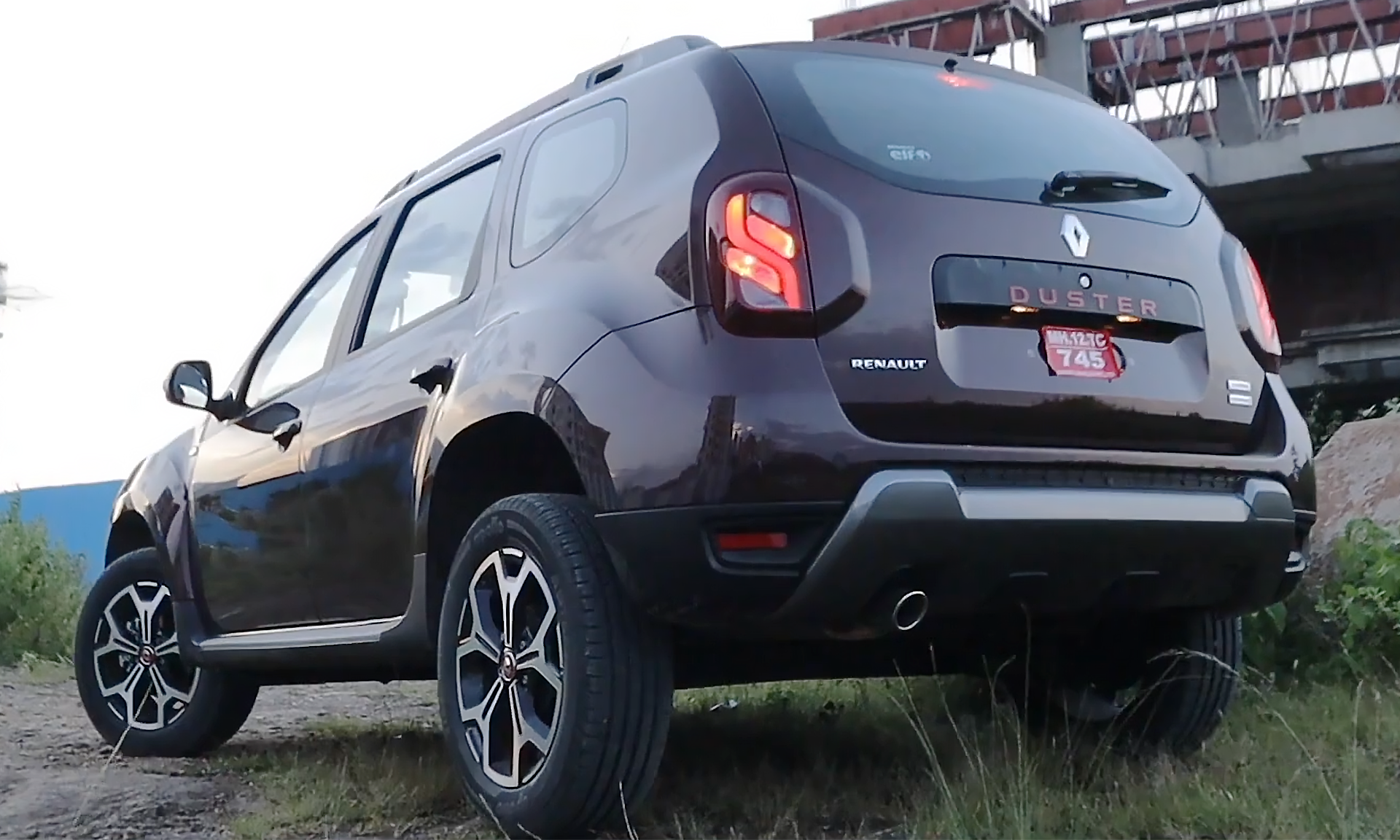
2020 Renault Duster RXZ (India, second facelift)

In March 2026, the 3rd generation of Renault Duster is launched in India as a more feature loaded model with more equipment and luxury features in India. The car is offered with 1.0 and 1.3L petrol powertrains and is expected to be launched with a 1.8L hybrid powertrain in the near future.

==== South Africa ====
Renault introduced the Duster in South Africa in October 2013. The Duster was originally imported from India, where it was also produced under the Dacia brand for other left-hand drive markets, namely the United Kingdom, Ireland, Cyprus and Malta. In September 2015, South Africa received the facelifted version of the Duster, with cars being imported from Romania.

==== Colombia ====
It was introduced in 2012 as the Renault Duster, and has been the best selling SUV in the country since then. It was assembled in the plant of SOFASA in Envigado, in four versions:

- 1.6 Expression: It equips driver's airbag and front electric windows. It is powered by a 1.6 16 valve, 110 PS engine. Also equips a 5-speed manual gearbox.
- 2.0 Dynamique: It equips two frontal airbags, rear electric windows, ABS, foglights, leather wheel, electric mirrors and a 6-speed manual gearbox. Also includes GPS system and leather seats as optional.
- 2.0 AT: Same as the Dynamique version but with a 4-speed automatic gearbox.
- 2.0 Dynamique 4X4: It is equipped the same as the Dynamique version, but includes 4WD system and black background headlights.

The Duster was exported from Colombia mostly to countries as Mexico, Ecuador and Bolivia. All versions are powered by a 16 valve, petrol engine. Also, since May 2014 it includes Media Nav system with GPS in Dynamique versions as optional.

The production of this generation in Colombia stopped in 2021.

==== Romania ====
In October 2015, a special edition called "Dacia Duster Connected by Orange" was released, featuring a Wi-Fi hotspot with a two-year free contract from the mobile operator Orange, a rear-view camera, a new brown paint colour, a new version of 16-inch rims and electric-heated front seats.

=== Renault Duster Oroch ===
The Renault Duster Oroch is a double cab pick-up version of the Duster. The Duster Oroch is the first Renault-badged pick-up and creates a new range in the pick-up market: 30 cm larger than the small ones and smaller than the large pick-up, but yet with 4 real doors instead of 2 or 3 for the usual smaller pick-up. It was unveiled on 18 June 2015 at the Buenos Aires Motor Show and was previewed by a concept car at the 2014 São Paulo Motor Show.

The Duster Oroch is available since September 2015 in South America and will get an automatic gearbox in 2016. It is powered by either the 1.6 litre or the 2.0 litre petrol engine, mated to 5-speed or 6-speed gearbox respectively.

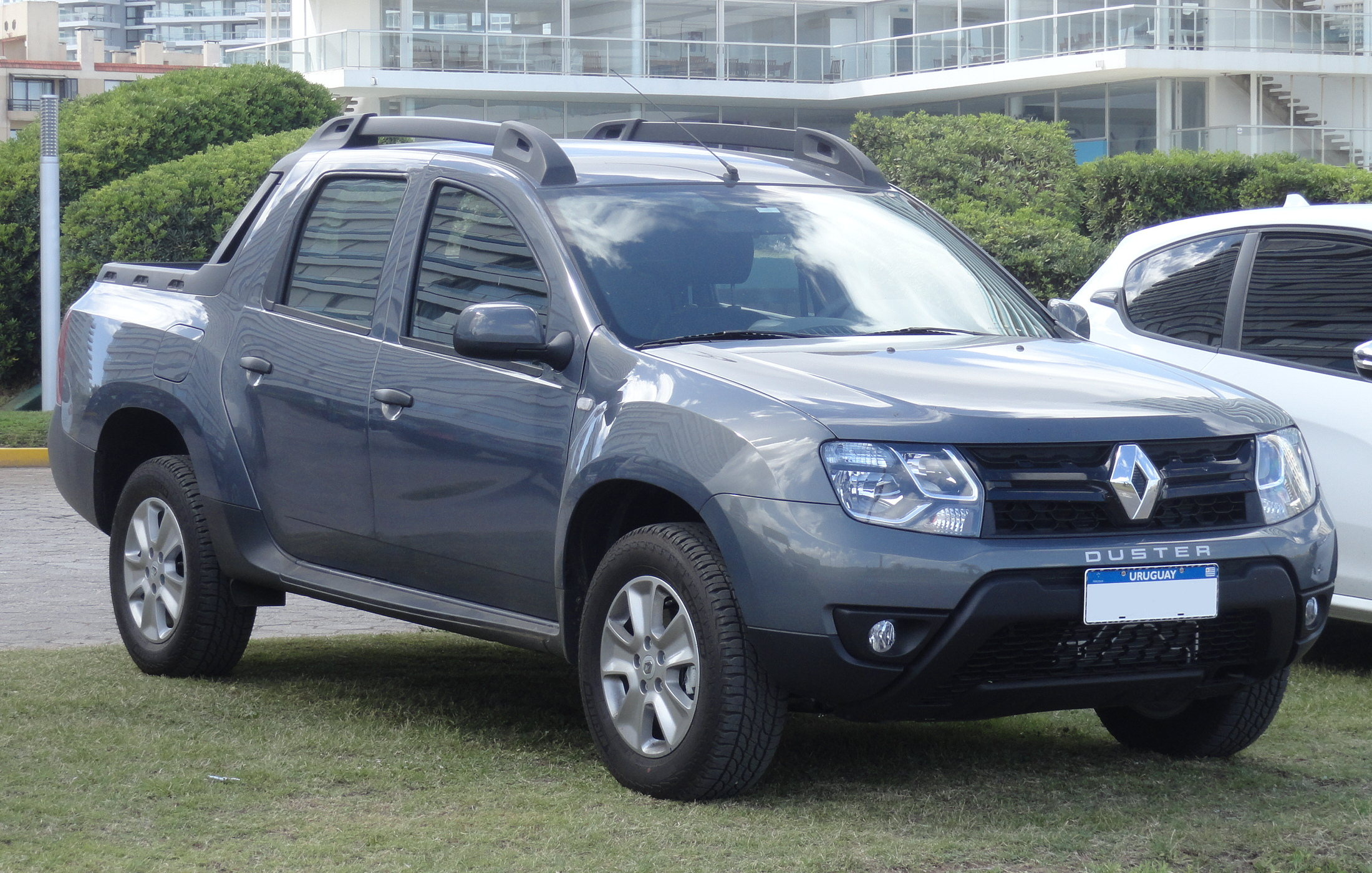
Front view

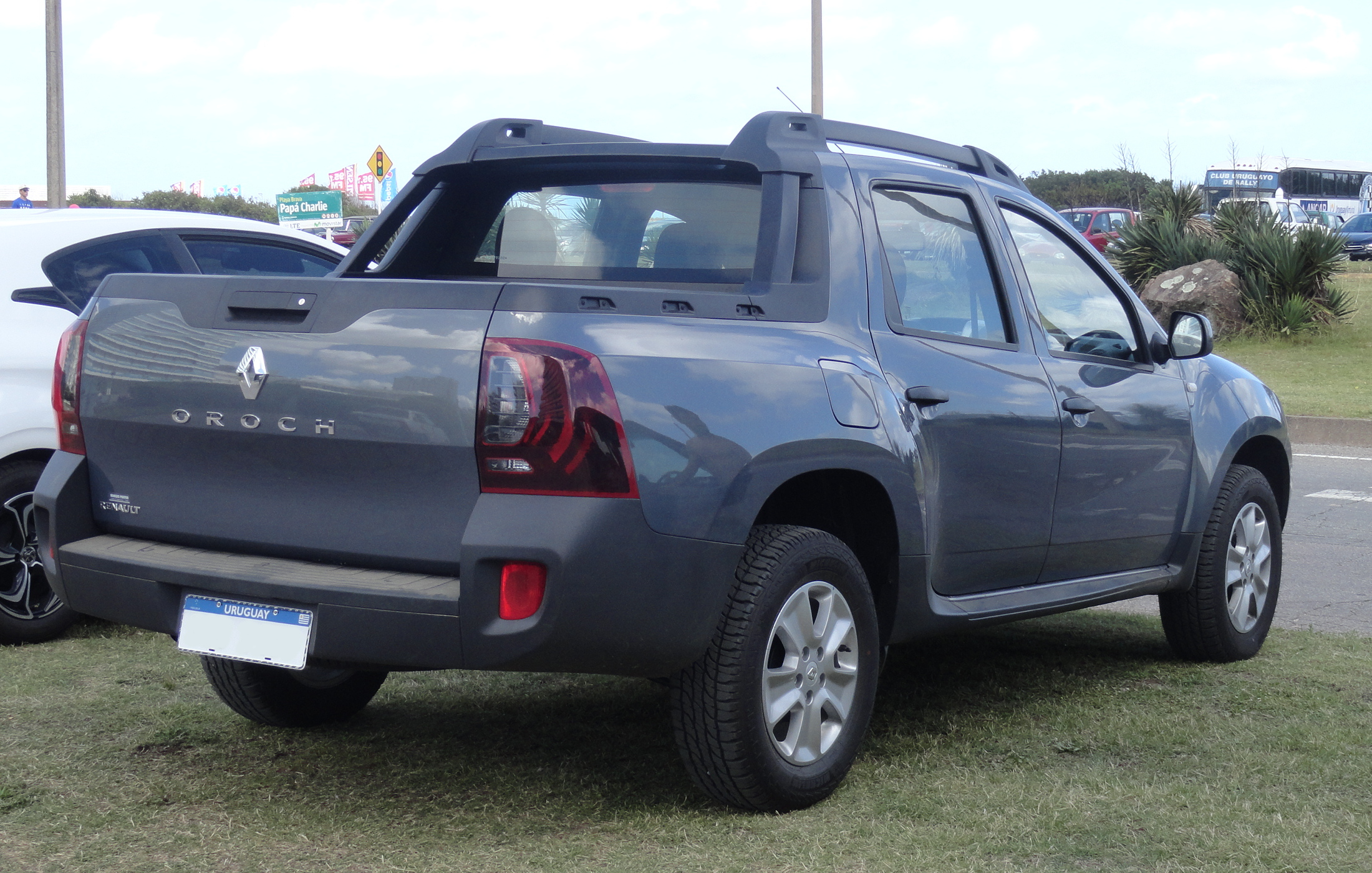
Rear view

=== Nissan Terrano ===
The Duster is also restyled and sold as the Nissan Terrano in CIS markets and India. The nameplate was used before as an alternative name to the Nissan Pathfinder. It is succeeded by the B0 platform-based Nissan Kicks in India.

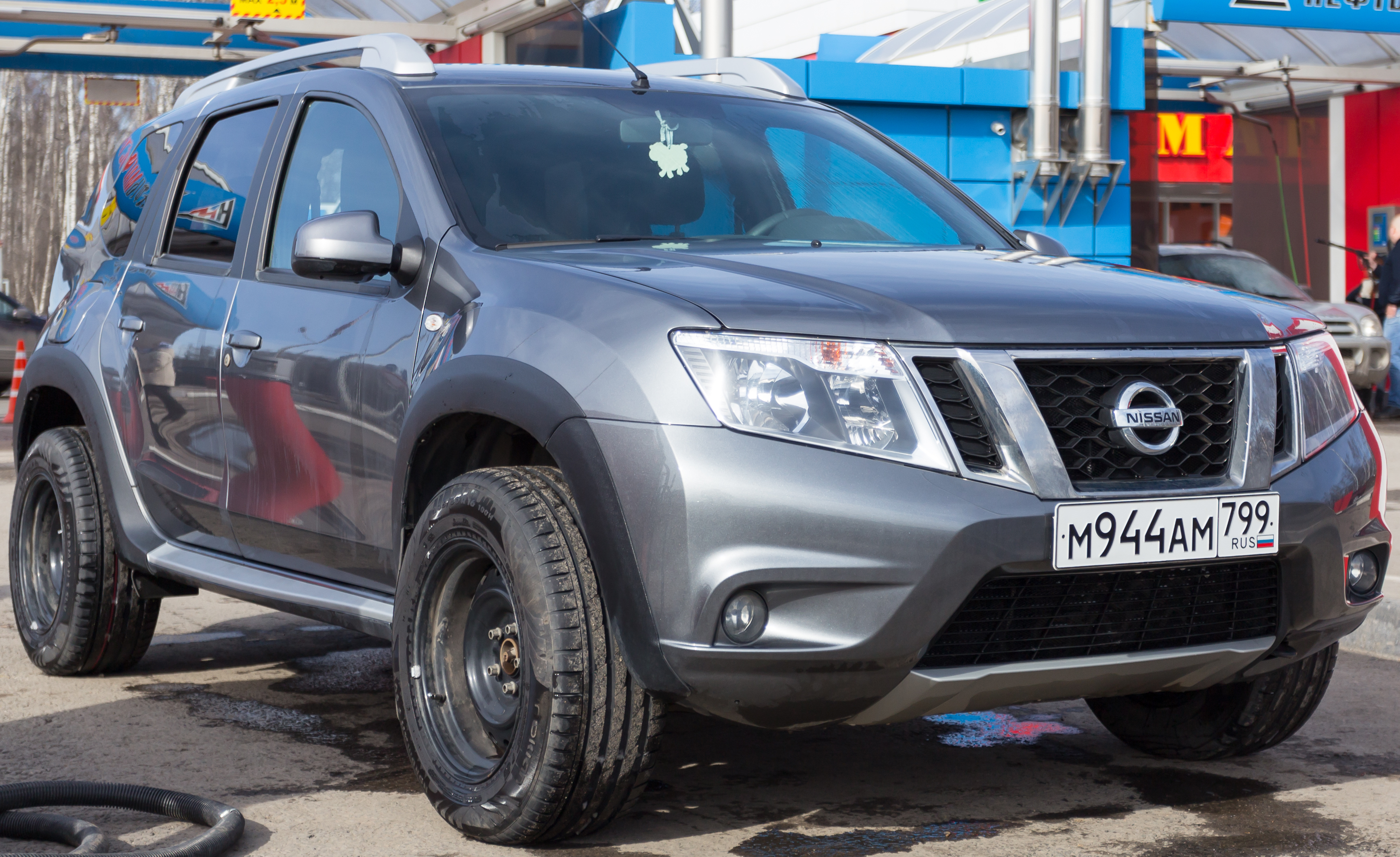
Front view

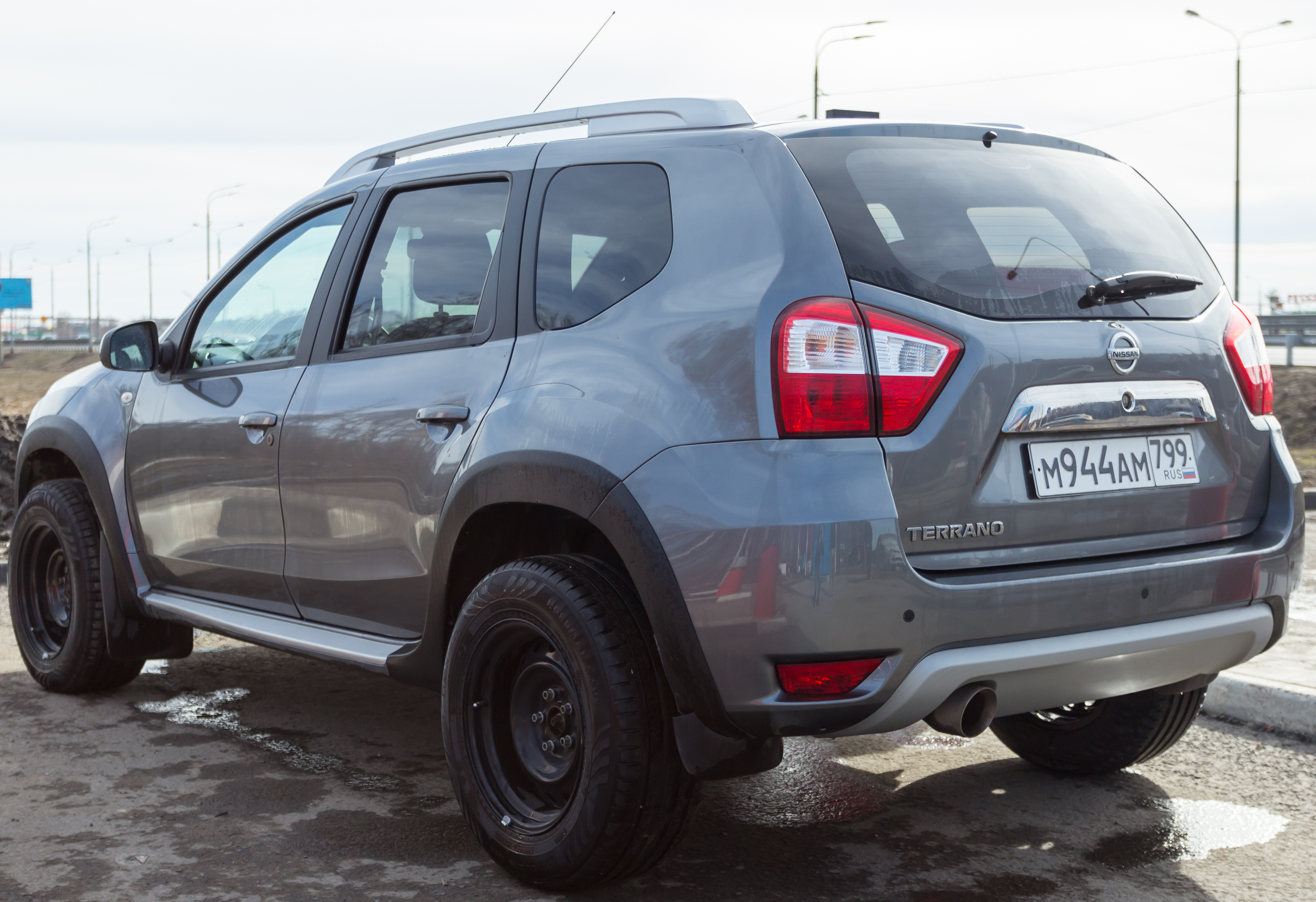
Rear view

=== Travec Tecdrah TTi ===
The Travec Tecdrah TTi is an off-road vehicle based on the first gen Dacia Duster, launched in 2011. which utilizes an APAL (of Russia) developed plastic body-on-space frame first used on the APAL Stalker.

=== Reception ===
British motoring journalist Jonny Smith took the Duster on a road test in Morocco for the Fifth Gear TV programme, describing it as "brilliant"; "I really like this". He particularly praised its handling on poorly maintained mountain roads, while commenting on its poor standard of finish. Another drive test in Morocco was performed by James May for the Top Gear magazine.

The Dacia Duster was awarded the "Autobest 2011" prize by the members of the Autobest jury, coming from fifteen countries (Bulgaria, Croatia, Czech Republic, Cyprus, Macedonia, Hungary, Poland, Romania, Russia, Serbia, Slovakia, Slovenia, Turkey, Ukraine and Malta). Ten members of the jury have designated the Duster as the winner, after scoring in 13 criteria such as fuel consumption, versatility, roominess or design. It outran the Renault Fluence, placed third.

The Dacia Duster was nominated among the finalists of the "2011 European Car of the Year" award. It received praise for being "a real bargain", "a competent off-roader", as well as "attractive" and "practical".

The Dacia Duster was named the "Scottish Car of the Year 2012" at a ceremony held in Glasgow on 14 October 2012. It was also named "The Bargain of the Year 2012" by the Top Gear magazine.

In India, the Renault Duster received the "2013 Indian Car of the Year" award from a jury comprising leading automotive magazines of the country.

== Second generation (HM; 2017) ==
Second generation
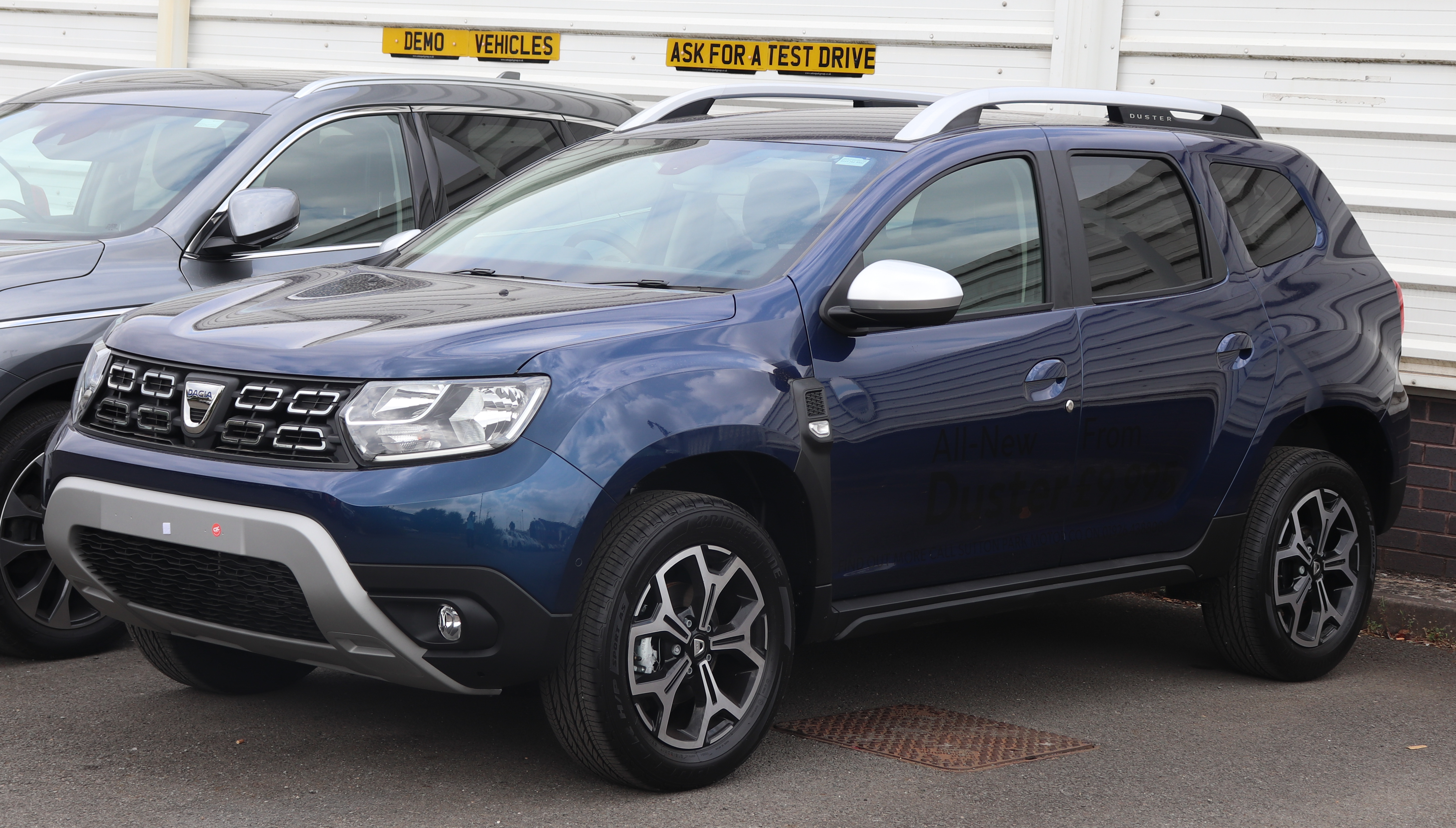
- 2018 Dacia Duster (pre-facelift)

Overview
- Model code: HM
- Also called: Renault Duster
- Production: 2017–2024 (Europe); 2020–present (Brazil); 2021–present (Colombia); 2021–present (Nigeria); 2021–2022 (Russia)
- Assembly: Romania: Mioveni; Brazil: São José dos Pinhais (Renault Brazil); Colombia: Envigado (SOFASA); Russia: Moscow (Renault Russia); Nigeria: Lagos (Coscharis)
- Designer: Renault Technocentre & Renault Technologie Roumanie; Erde Tungaa (exterior); Emmanuel Klissarov (exterior)

Body and chassis
- Body style: 5-door crossover SUV; 2-door pickup
- Platform: Dacia B0+ platform
- Related: Renault Arkana (Russia); Renault Captur/Kaptur (HA); Nissan Kicks (D15)

Powertrain
- Engine: Petrol: 1.0 L H5D I3 turbo; 1.2 L H5Ft I4 turbo; 1.3 L H5Ht I4 turbo; 1.6 L H4M I4; 2.0 L F4R I4; Diesel: 1.5 L K9K I4
- Transmission: 5-speed manual 6-speed manual 6-speed EDC; CVT

Dimensions
- Wheelbase: 2,673 mm (105.2 in)
- Length: 4,320 mm (170.1 in); 4,341 mm (170.9 in) (pick-up)
- Width: 1,822 mm (71.7 in)
- Height: 1,630–1,700 mm (64.2–66.9 in)

A second generation was announced between 14 and 24 September 2017 during the Frankfurt Motor Show with the production models reaching the Romanian market in November 2017. The new model has nearly the same dimensions, and built on the same B0 platform as the first generation. Although it is near-identical in terms of dimensions, according to Renault design chief, Laurens van den Acker, every body panel is new. The interior design has been revamped and the interior noise has been reduced to half of the previous generation. It has a nearly the same boot volume of 445 litres on two-wheel-drive versions, or 376 litres on four-wheel-drive versions, and a total dedicated storage space of 28.6 litres. A facelifted version was unveiled in 2021.

It now features an electric power steering, a MultiView camera system consisting of four cameras, blind spot warning system, automatic climate control, keyless entry and ignition system, and daytime running lights. The ground clearance has been increased and a hill-start assist system is also offered, as well as hill descent control. The top trim level features 17 inch wheels. The mid-range Comfort model offers as standard Bluetooth, air conditioning, SatNav, rear parking sensors, rear camera, cruise control, six speed gearbox, alloy wheels, sports front seats.

It retains tweaked versions of the same 1.5-litre diesel, and 1.6-litre and 1.2-litre petrol engines as the outgoing model. The diesel can be mated to a dual-clutch automatic transmission (EDC). GCC markets and several Latin American markets continue to offer a 2.0-litre petrol engine as the main option; this engine is not available in Europe where it does not meet CO_{2}, emissions, and fuel consumption requirements.

In 2018, Renault first rolled out across its Dacia range its new modified Euro 6 compliant 1.5-litre common-rail turbodiesel engine. To keep its NOx emissions low, this engine requires the injection of AdBlue fluid into the exhaust system.

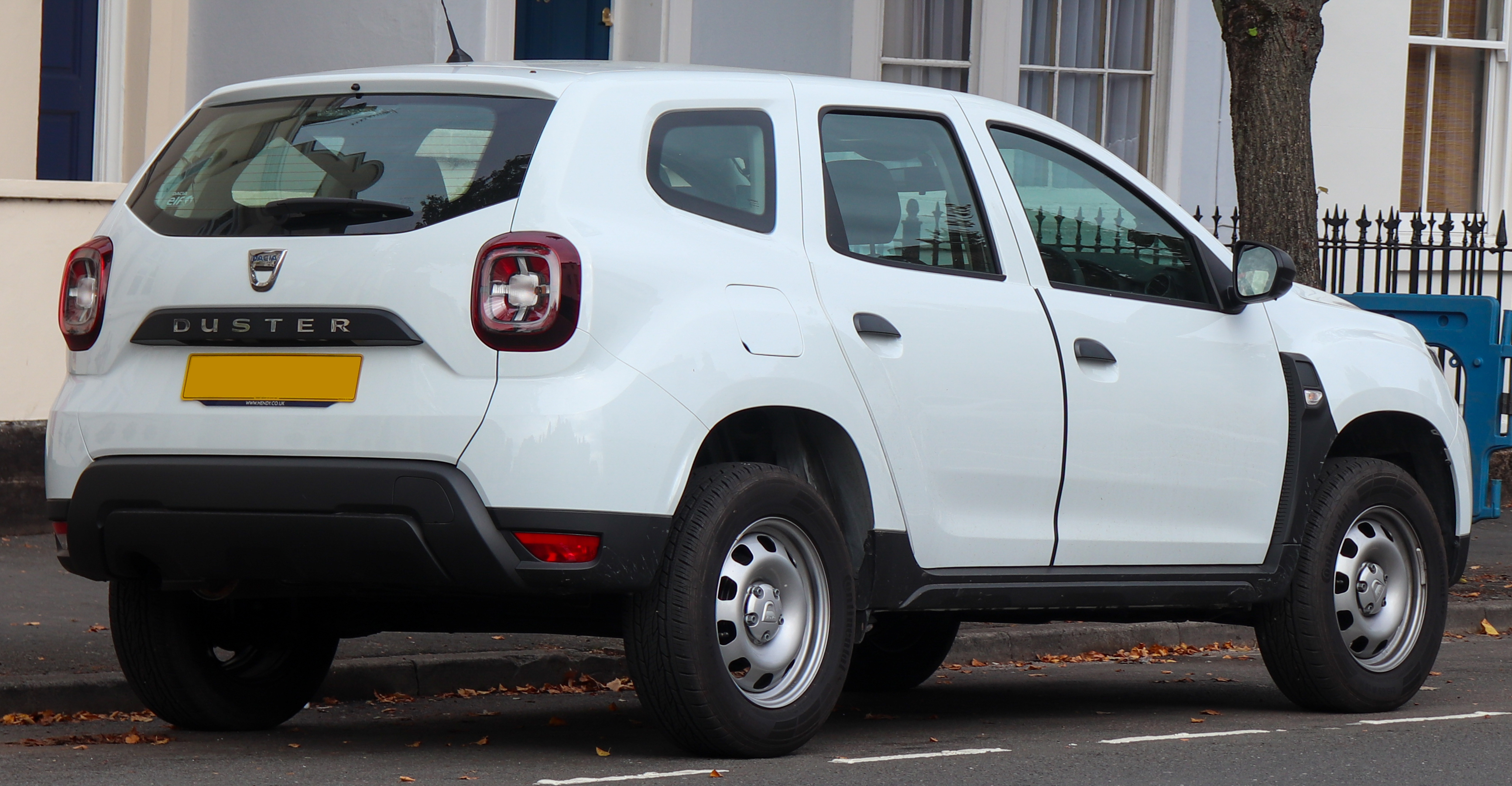
2019 Dacia Duster Access (UK, pre-facelift)

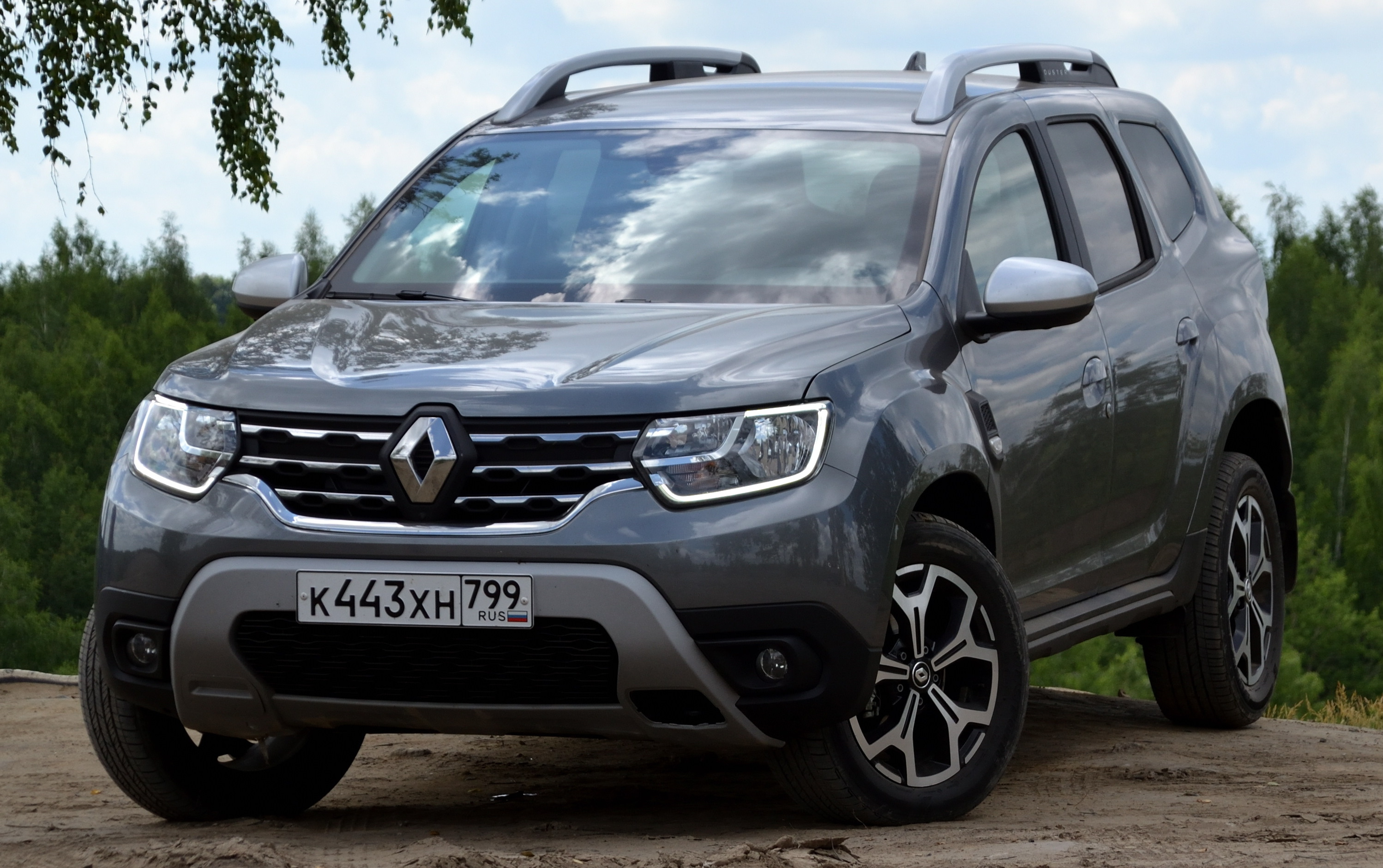
2021 Renault Duster (Russia)

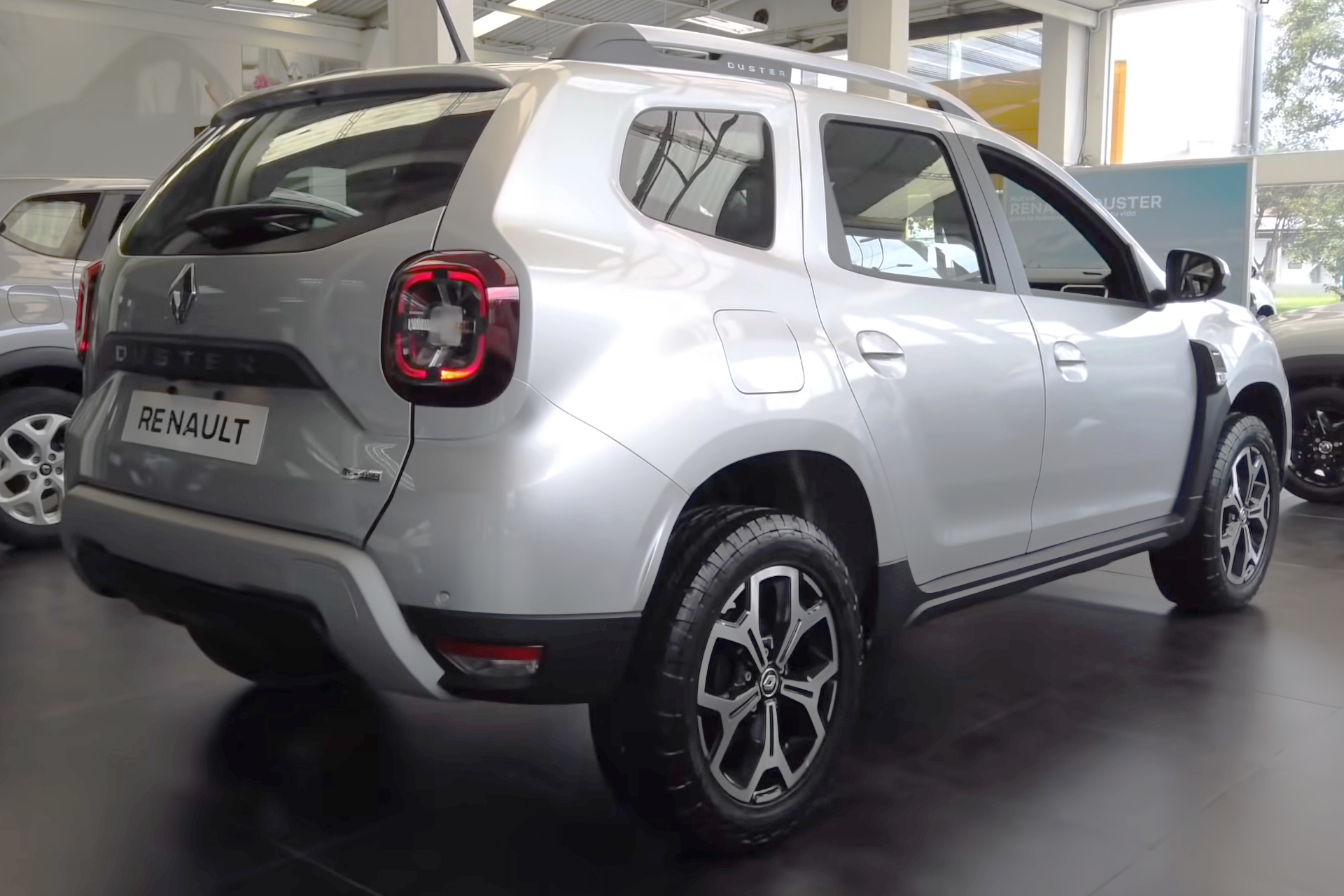
2022 Renault Duster Intens 4x4 (Colombia)

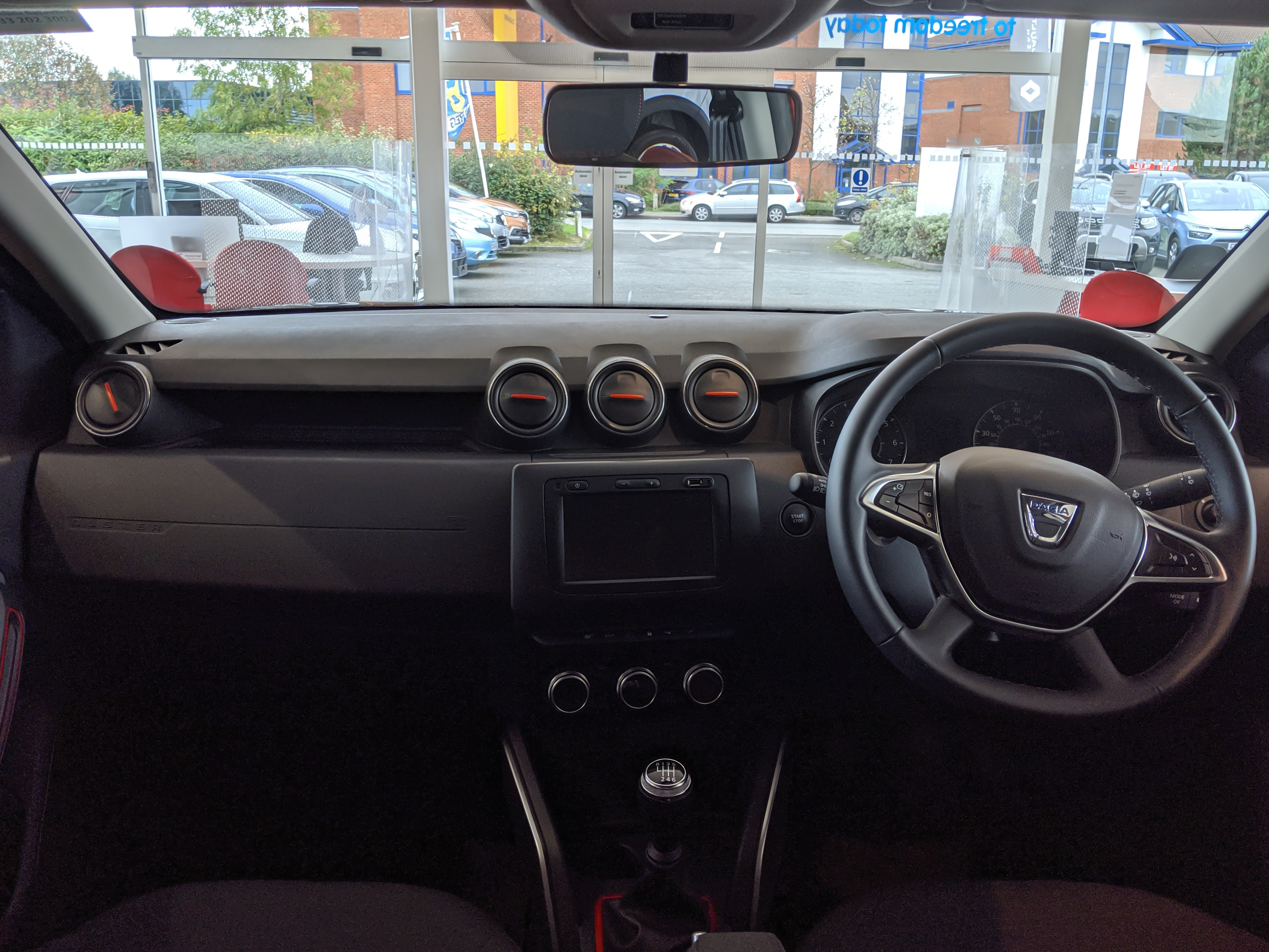
Interior (Dacia Duster, pre-facelift)

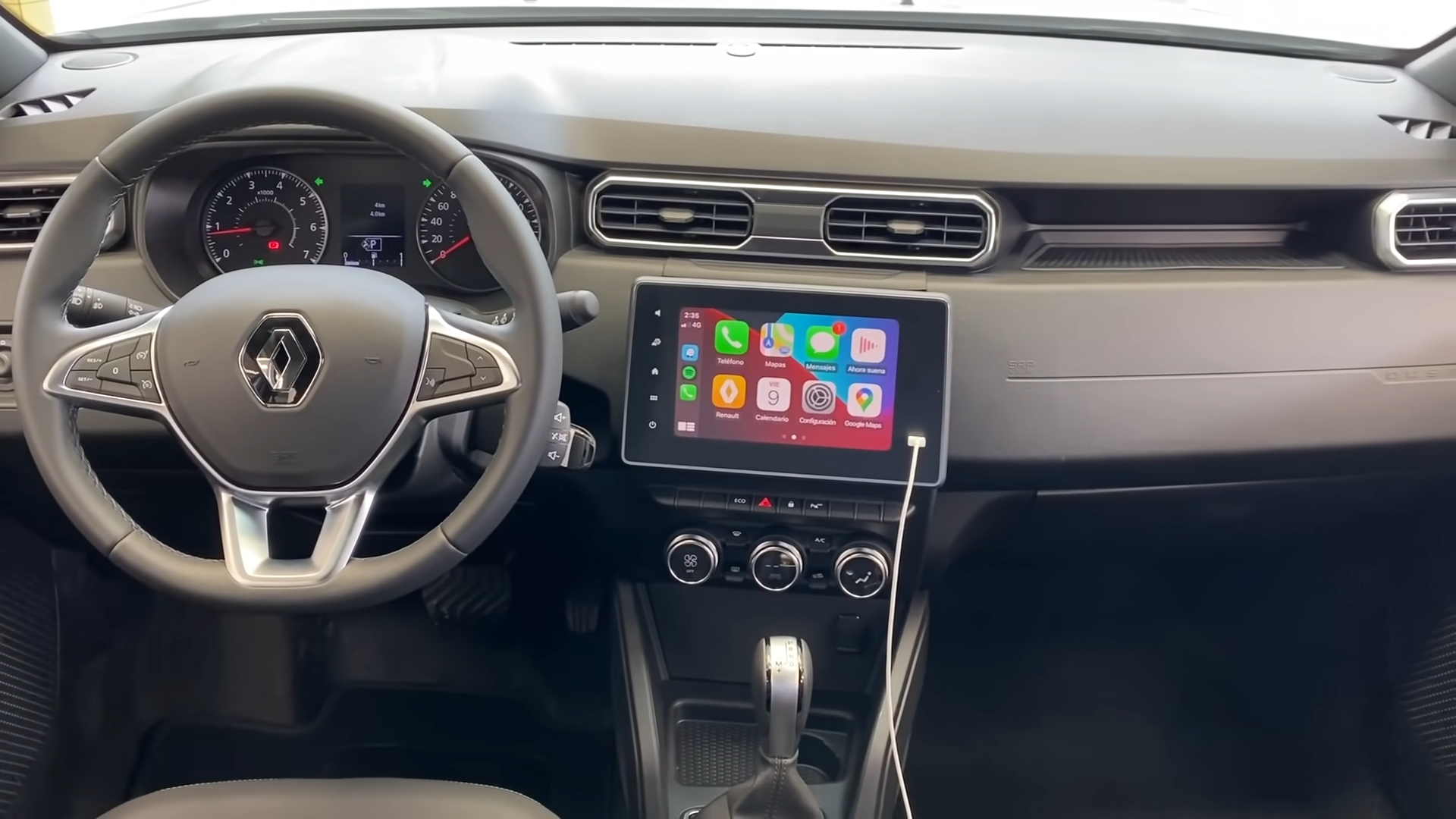
Interior (Renault Duster, Latin America)

=== Safety ===
==== Latin NCAP ====
The Duster in its most basic Latin American market configuration with 2 airbags and ESC received 4 stars for adult occupants and 3 stars for toddlers from Latin NCAP 2.0 in 2019.

Latin NCAP 2.0 test results Renault New Duster + 2 Airbags (2019, based on Euro NCAP 2008)
Test	Points	Stars
Adult occupant:	26.01/34.0	3 /5 stars
Child occupant:	28.50/49.00	3 /5 stars

Latin NCAP 3.0 did a crash test of the 2021 Renault Duster manufactured in Brazil or Romania, in its most basic Latin American market configuration with 2 airbags, airbag switch, and ESC obtaining 0 stars in the crash tests, during the tests the passenger side door was opened and the car had a fuel leak. that made the Latin NCAP call for attention to Renault to recall the cars sold and prevent the car from leaking fuel during an accident.

Latin NCAP 3.0 test results 2021 Renault Duster (2021, similar to Euro NCAP 2014)
Test	Points	%
Overall:	0 /5 stars	
Adult occupant:	11	29%
Child occupant:	11	23%
Pedestrian:	24	51%
Safety assist:	15	35%

==== Euro NCAP ====
Euro NCAP test results* Dacia Duster (2017)
Test	Points	%
Overall:	3 /5 stars	
Adult occupant:	27	71%
Child occupant:	32	66%
Pedestrian:	24	56%
Safety assist:	5	37%

In December 2017, Euro NCAP has published the results for the crash-tests of the second generation model. It received three out of five stars, the result being considered an expected one, although most of its rivals received five stars. It was awarded 27 points (71%) for the adult occupant protection, 32 points (66%) for the child occupant protection, 24 points (56%) for the pedestrian protection and five points (37%) for the safety assist features.

In the frontal offset test, the driver received marginal to good protection ratings, while the passenger occupant received adequate to good ratings. In the frontal full width test, the driver's head received a poor protection rating and an adequate to good rating for the rest of the body.

Pedestrian protection was "predominantly good or adequate but poor results were recorded along the base of the windscreen and along the stiff windscreen pillars. The bumper provided good protection to pedestrians' legs and protection of the pelvis was also good at all test locations."

In terms of safety equipment, it was downrated because of the lack of knee airbags, rear side chest airbags, side pelvis airbags, automatic emergency braking system or lane assist system, but it received points for the availability of the speed limiter and the seat belt reminder.

=== Powertrain ===
In January 2020, Dacia introduced the Duster Eco-G at the Brussels Motor Show, equipped with the 1.0 TCe 100 PS three-cylinder engine running on both LPG and petrol.

Engine	Years	Configuration	Displacement	Power	Torque	Top speed	Acceleration (0–100 km/h)	Fuel tank	Fuel consumption (combined)	CO2 emissions (combined)	Notes
Petrol:
1.0 TCe 90	09/2020–03/2023	Turbocharged inline 3-cylinder	999 cc	67 kW (91 PS) @ 4,900 rpm	160 N⋅m @ 2,750 rpm	166 km/h	13.8 s	50 L	5.6–5.7 L/100 km	138–143 g/km	Euro 6d-ISC-FCM
1.0 TCe 100	07/2019–09/2020	Turbocharged inline 3-cylinder	999 cc	74 kW (101 PS) @ 5,000 rpm	160 N⋅m @ 2,750 rpm	168 km/h	13.5 s	50 L	5.3–5.6 L/100 km	121–127 g/km	Euro 6d-TEMP
1.6 SCe 115	01/2018–09/2018	Inline 4-cylinder	1,598 cc	84 kW (114 PS) @ 5,500 rpm	156 N⋅m @ 4,000 rpm	172 km/h	11.9 s	50 L	6.6 L/100 km	149 g/km	Euro 6
1.6 SCe 115	09/2018–07/2019	Inline 4-cylinder	1,598 cc	84 kW (114 PS) @ 5,500 rpm	156 N⋅m @ 4,000 rpm	170 km/h	11.9 s	50 L	6.5 L/100 km	149 g/km	Euro 6
1.6 SCe 115 4×4	01/2018–09/2018	Inline 4-cylinder	1,598 cc	84 kW (114 PS) @ 5,500 rpm	156 N⋅m @ 4,000 rpm	170 km/h	12.9 s	50 L	7.0 L/100 km	158 g/km	Euro 6
1.6 SCe 115 4×4	09/2018–07/2019	Inline 4-cylinder	1,598 cc	84 kW (114 PS) @ 5,500 rpm	156 N⋅m @ 4,000 rpm	173 km/h	12.9 s	50 L	6.9 L/100 km	158 g/km	Euro 6
1.2 TCe 125	01/2018–09/2018	Turbocharged inline 4-cylinder	1,197 cc	92 kW (125 PS) @ 5,250 rpm	205 N⋅m @ 2,300 rpm	177 km/h	10.4 s	50 L	6.2 L/100 km	138 g/km	Euro 6
1.2 TCe 125 4×4	01/2018–09/2018	Turbocharged inline 4-cylinder	1,197 cc	92 kW (125 PS) @ 5,250 rpm	205 N⋅m @ 2,300 rpm	179 km/h	11.0 s	50 L	6.4 L/100 km	145 g/km	Euro 6
1.3 TCe 130	01/2019–09/2020	Turbocharged inline 4-cylinder	1,332 cc	96 kW (131 PS) @ 5,000 rpm	240 N⋅m @ 1,600 rpm	191–193 km/h	10.6–11.1 s	50 L	5.8–6.1 L/100 km	132–140 g/km	Euro 6d-TEMP
1.3 TCe 130	09/2020–07/2024	Turbocharged inline 4-cylinder	1,332 cc	96 kW (131 PS) @ 6,000 rpm	240 N⋅m @ 1,600 rpm	191 km/h	10.6 s	50 L	5.6–5.7 L/100 km	128–129 g/km	Euro 6d-ISC-FCM
1.3 TCe 130 4×4	05/2019–09/2020	Turbocharged inline 4-cylinder	1,332 cc	96 kW (131 PS) @ 5,000 rpm	240 N⋅m @ 1,600 rpm	188 km/h	11.1 s	50 L	6.1–6.4 L/100 km	140–145 g/km	Euro 6d-TEMP
1.3 TCe 130 4×4	09/2020–09/2021	Turbocharged inline 4-cylinder	1,332 cc	96 kW (131 PS) @ 6,000 rpm	240 N⋅m @ 1,600 rpm	188 km/h	11.1 s	50 L	6.1 L/100 km	140 g/km	Euro 6d-ISC-FCM
1.3 TCe 150	01/2019–09/2020	Turbocharged inline 4-cylinder	1,332 cc	110 kW (150 PS) @ 5,000 rpm	250 N⋅m @ 1,700 rpm	200–202 km/h	9.7–10.4 s	50 L	5.8–6.1 L/100 km	132–140 g/km	Euro 6d-TEMP
1.3 TCe 150	09/2020–07/2024	Turbocharged inline 4-cylinder	1,332 cc	110 kW (150 PS) @ 6,000 rpm	250 N⋅m @ 1,700 rpm	200 km/h	9.7 s	50 L	5.6–5.7 L/100 km	128–129 g/km	Euro 6d-ISC-FCM
1.3 TCe 150 4×4	05/2019–09/2020	Turbocharged inline 4-cylinder	1,332 cc	110 kW (150 PS) @ 5,000 rpm	250 N⋅m @ 1,700 rpm	197–198 km/h	10.6 s	50 L	6.1–6.4 L/100 km	140–145 g/km	Euro 6d-TEMP
1.3 TCe 150 4×4	09/2020–07/2024	Turbocharged inline 4-cylinder	1,332 cc	110 kW (150 PS) @ 6,000 rpm	250 N⋅m @ 1,700 rpm	198 km/h	10.6 s	50 L	6.1 L/100 km	140 g/km	Euro 6d-ISC-FCM
Petrol / LPG:
1.0 TCe 100 ECO-G	01/2020–07/2024	Turbocharged inline 3-cylinder	999 cc	74 kW (101 PS) @ 5,000 rpm	170 N⋅m @ 2,000 rpm	166 km/h (petrol) / 168 km/h (LPG)	14.4 s (petrol) / 13.8 s (LPG)	50 L + 33.6 L LPG	5.5 L/100 km (petrol) / 6.8–6.9 L/100 km (LPG)	125–126 g/km (petrol) / 111–112 g/km (LPG)	Euro 6d-TEMP
1.6 SCe 115 LPG	01/2018–09/2018	Inline 4-cylinder	1,598 cc	84 kW (114 PS) @ 5,500 rpm (petrol) / 80 kW (109 PS) @ 5,500 rpm (LPG)	156 N⋅m @ 4,000 rpm (petrol) / 144 N⋅m @ 4,000 rpm (LPG)	172 km/h (petrol) / 169 km/h (LPG)	12.2 s (petrol) / 12.6 s (LPG)	50 L + 33.6 L LPG	6.9 L/100 km (petrol) / 8.8 L/100 km (LPG)	156 g/km (petrol) / 141 g/km (LPG)	Euro 6
1.6 SCe 115 LPG	09/2018–07/2019	Inline 4-cylinder	1,598 cc	84 kW (114 PS) @ 5,500 rpm (petrol) / 80 kW (109 PS) @ 5,500 rpm (LPG)	156 N⋅m @ 4,000 rpm (petrol) / 144 N⋅m @ 4,000 rpm (LPG)	170 km/h (petrol) / 160 km/h (LPG)	12.2 s (petrol) / 12.6 s (LPG)	50 L + 33.6 L LPG	6.8 L/100 km (petrol) / 8.7 L/100 km (LPG)	156 g/km (petrol) / 141 g/km (LPG)	Euro 6d-TEMP
Diesel:
1.5 dCi 90	01/2018–09/2018	Turbocharged inline 4-cylinder	1,461 cc	66 kW (90 PS) @ 3,750 rpm	200 N⋅m @ 1,750 rpm	158 km/h	13.8 s	50 L	4.4 L/100 km	115 g/km	Euro 6
1.5 Blue dCi 95	09/2018–07/2019	Turbocharged inline 4-cylinder	1,461 cc	70 kW (95 PS) @ 3,750 rpm	240 N⋅m @ 1,750 rpm	167 km/h	12.6 s	50 L	4.4 L/100 km	115 g/km	Euro 6d-TEMP
1.5 dCi 110	01/2018–09/2018	Turbocharged inline 4-cylinder	1,461 cc	80 kW (109 PS) @ 4,000 rpm	260 N⋅m @ 1,750 rpm	171 km/h	11.8 s	50 L	4.4 L/100 km	115 g/km	Euro 6
1.5 dCi 110 4×4	01/2018–09/2018	Turbocharged inline 4-cylinder	1,461 cc	80 kW (109 PS) @ 4,000 rpm	260 N⋅m @ 2,000 rpm	169 km/h	12.4 s	50 L	4.7 L/100 km	123 g/km	Euro 6
1.5 Blue dCi 115	09/2018–09/2020	Turbocharged inline 4-cylinder	1,461 cc	85 kW (116 PS) @ 3,750 rpm	260 N⋅m @ 2,000 rpm	183 km/h	10.3–10.5 s	50 L	4.1–4.4 L/100 km	108–115 g/km	Euro 6d-TEMP
1.5 Blue dCi 115	09/2020–07/2024	Turbocharged inline 4-cylinder	1,461 cc	85 kW (116 PS) @ 3,750 rpm	260 N⋅m @ 1,750 rpm	183 km/h	10.2 s	50 L	4.2–4.3 L/100 km	110–112 g/km	Euro 6d-ISC-FCM
1.5 Blue dCi 115 4×4	10/2018–09/2020	Turbocharged inline 4-cylinder	1,461 cc	85 kW (116 PS) @ 3,750 rpm	260 N⋅m @ 2,000 rpm	180 km/h	10.4–12.1 s	50 L	4.7 L/100 km	118–123 g/km	Euro 6d-TEMP
1.5 Blue dCi 115 4×4	09/2020–07/2024	Turbocharged inline 4-cylinder	1,461 cc	85 kW (116 PS) @ 3,750 rpm	260 N⋅m @ 1,750 rpm	183 km/h	10.4 s	50 L	4.7 L/100 km	118–119 g/km	Euro 6d-ISC-FCM

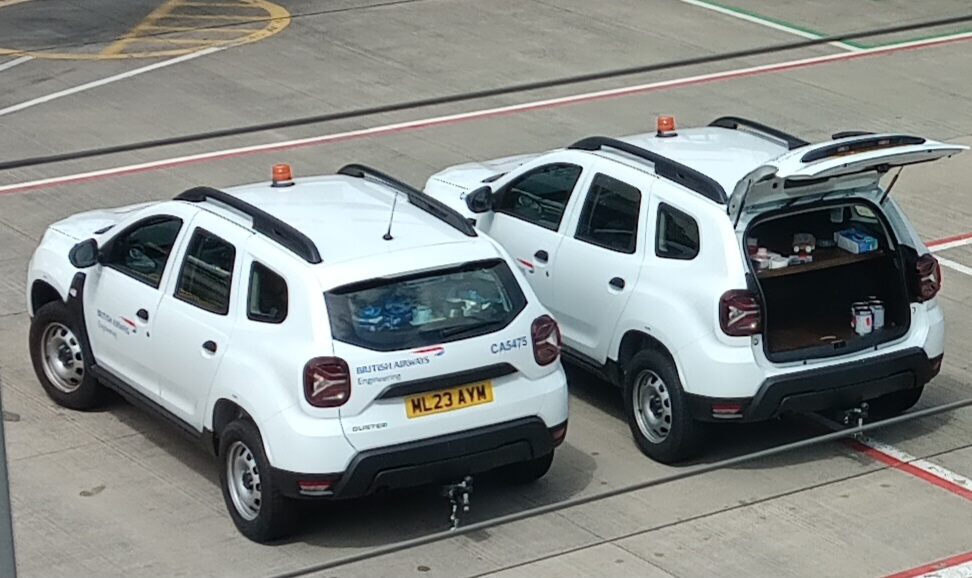
Dacia Duster utility vehicles at Heathrow Airport

=== Duster Pick-Up ===
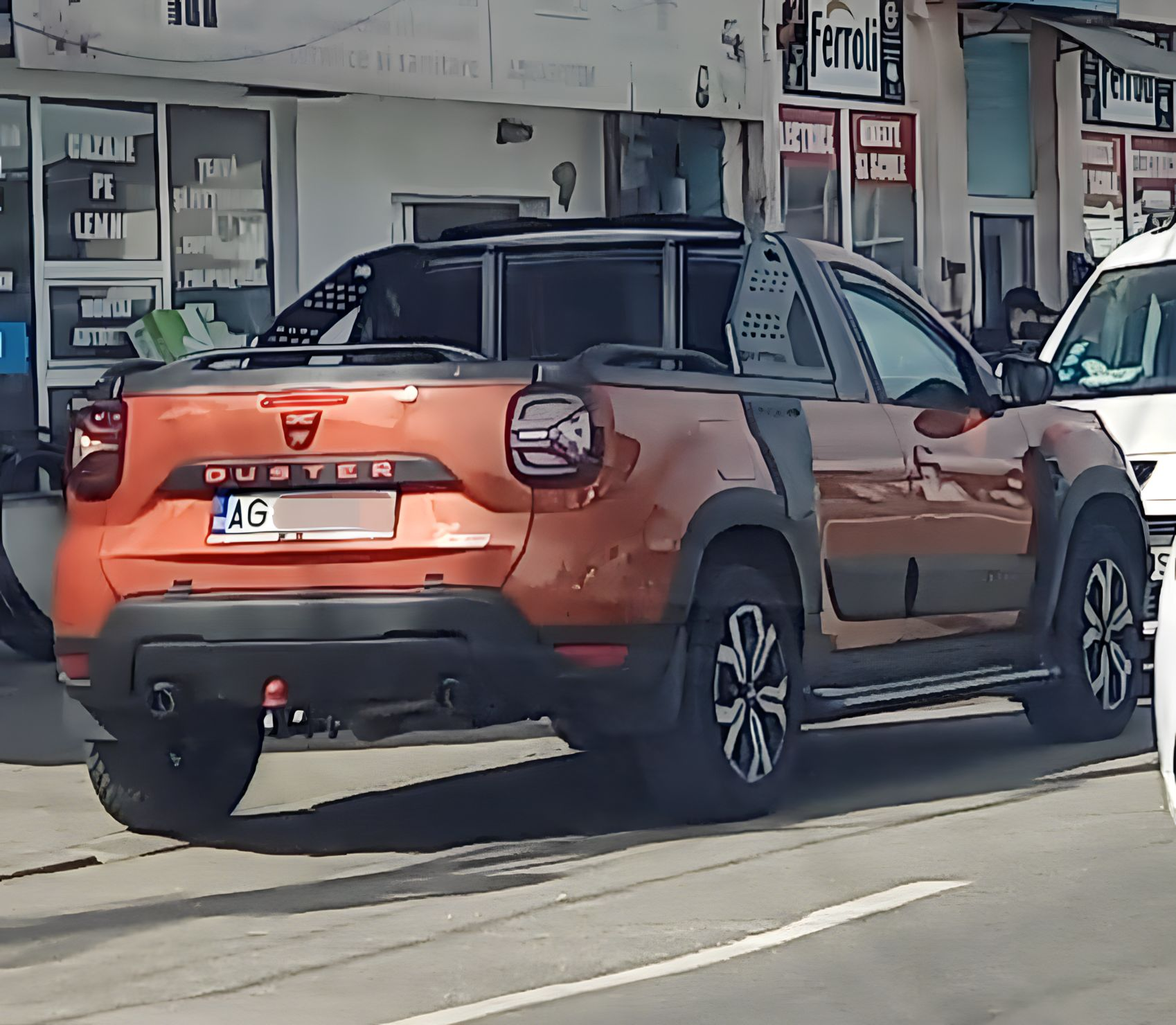
Dacia Duster Pick-Up (facelift)

In October 2020, Dacia introduced the single cab pick-up version based on the four-wheel drive Duster model. Developed in collaboration with the Romanian engineering consultancy and coachbuilder Romturingia from Câmpulung who converted, at around €3,000 each, around 500 Dusters into pickups starting in 2014 for Romanian utility company OMV Petrom, the Duster Pick-Up features a 1.65 m (5.4 ft) length cargo bed with a loading capacity of 1,000 L (220 imp gal; 260 US gal) and a maximum payload of 500 kg (1,100 lb), has a ground clearance of 224 mm (8.8 in), and is equipped with the Blue dCi diesel engine that develops 115 hp (86 kW) and 260 N⋅m (190 lbf⋅ft) of torque.

=== Duster Fiskal ===
In 2018, Dacia's Austrian importer developed a panel van version of the second generation Duster called the Dacia Duster Fiskal. This has a flat metal loading floor, a metal cargo divider, and blanked rear side windows. The rear side doors still opened, although the Duster Fiskal is a strict two-seater. The Austrian importer had also offered a Fiskal version of the original Duster.

=== Reception ===
British website carwow has reviewed the car in July 2018. It was criticised for the poor range of equipment in the lowest trim level, considering its price, for its plasticky, dark-coloured and "cheap-feeling" interior, the lack of light for the vanity mirror or the noisy electric motor for the windows. Among the good points there are its accessible folding seats, the rear-view and panoramic cameras, the in-depth-adjustable steering wheel, the good visibility and handling inside town, the soft suspension and the lock mode for the four-wheel-drive.

=== Facelift ===
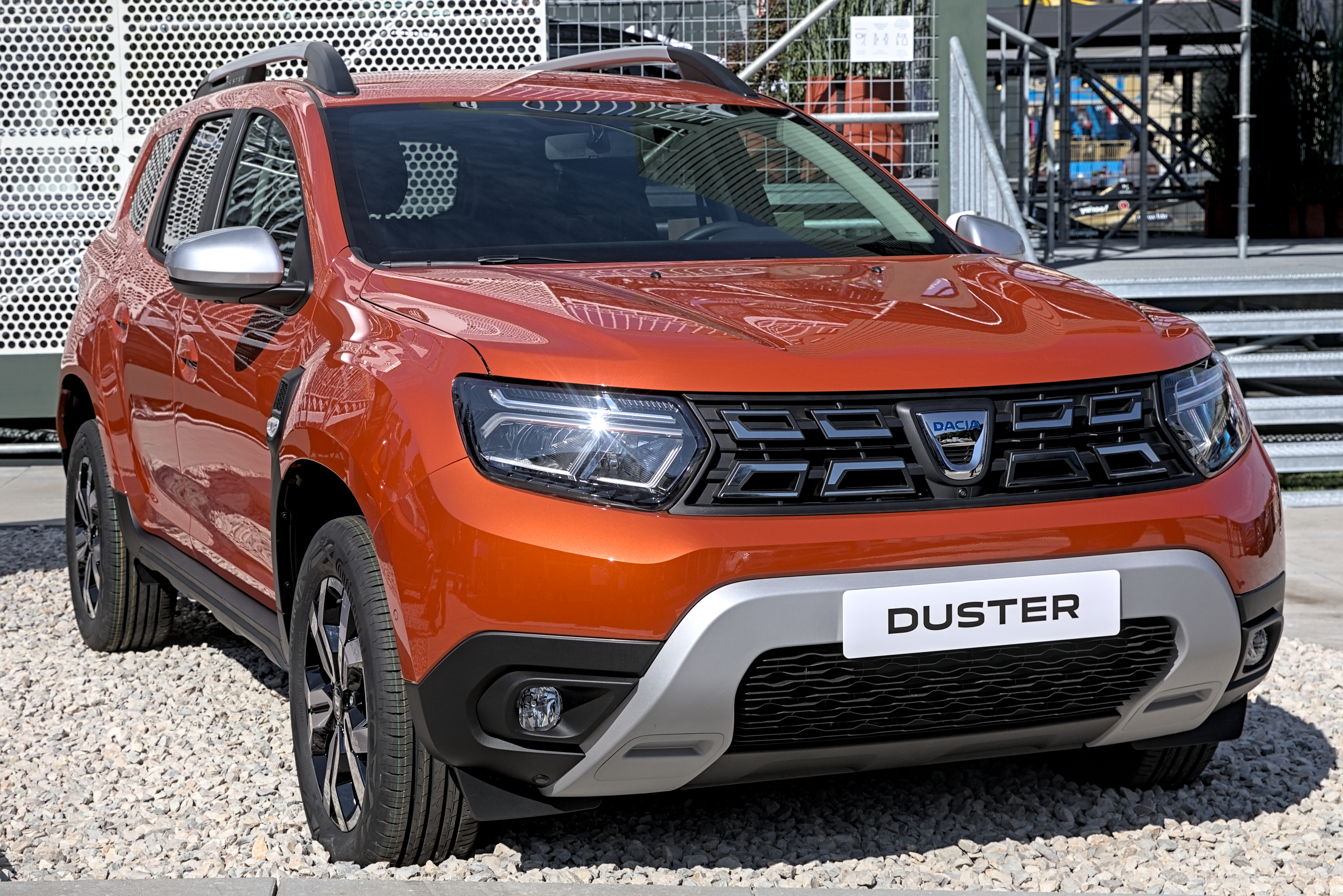

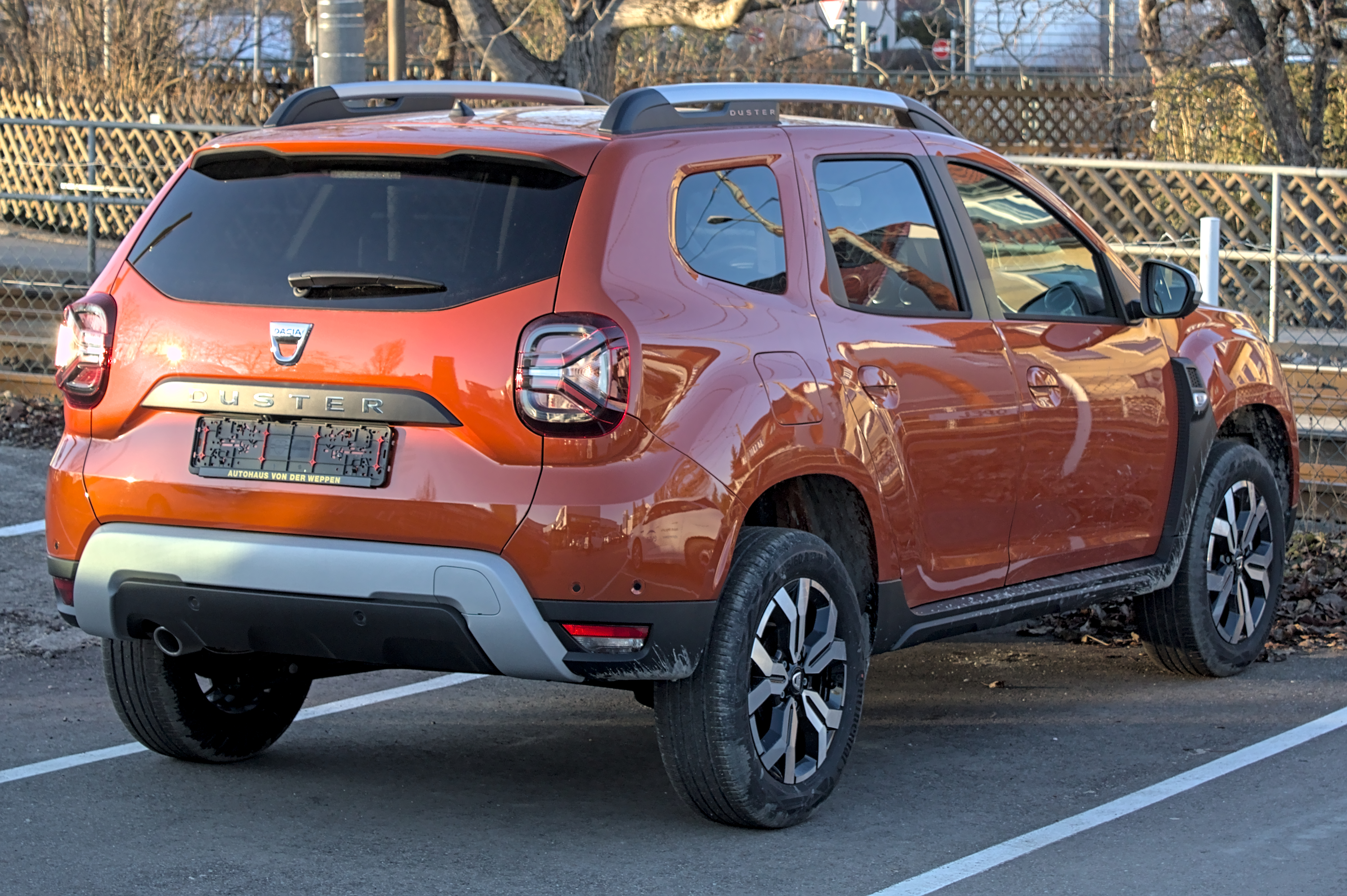
2021 Dacia Duster (facelift)

The restyled version of the Duster was presented on 22 June 2021 and went on sale in September 2021. The updated Duster comes equipped with a new light signature, both front and rear, similar to the third-generation Sandero. The pattern of the grille has been slightly simplified and a sliding central armrest is also available inside.

The number of engines available was reduced, with there being two petrol engines of 130 and 150 hp, a petrol/LPG version of 100 hp, and a 115 hp diesel engine available in all-wheel drive. The most powerful engine is now available as standard with the 6-speed automatic transmission (EDC6).

=== 2022 refresh ===
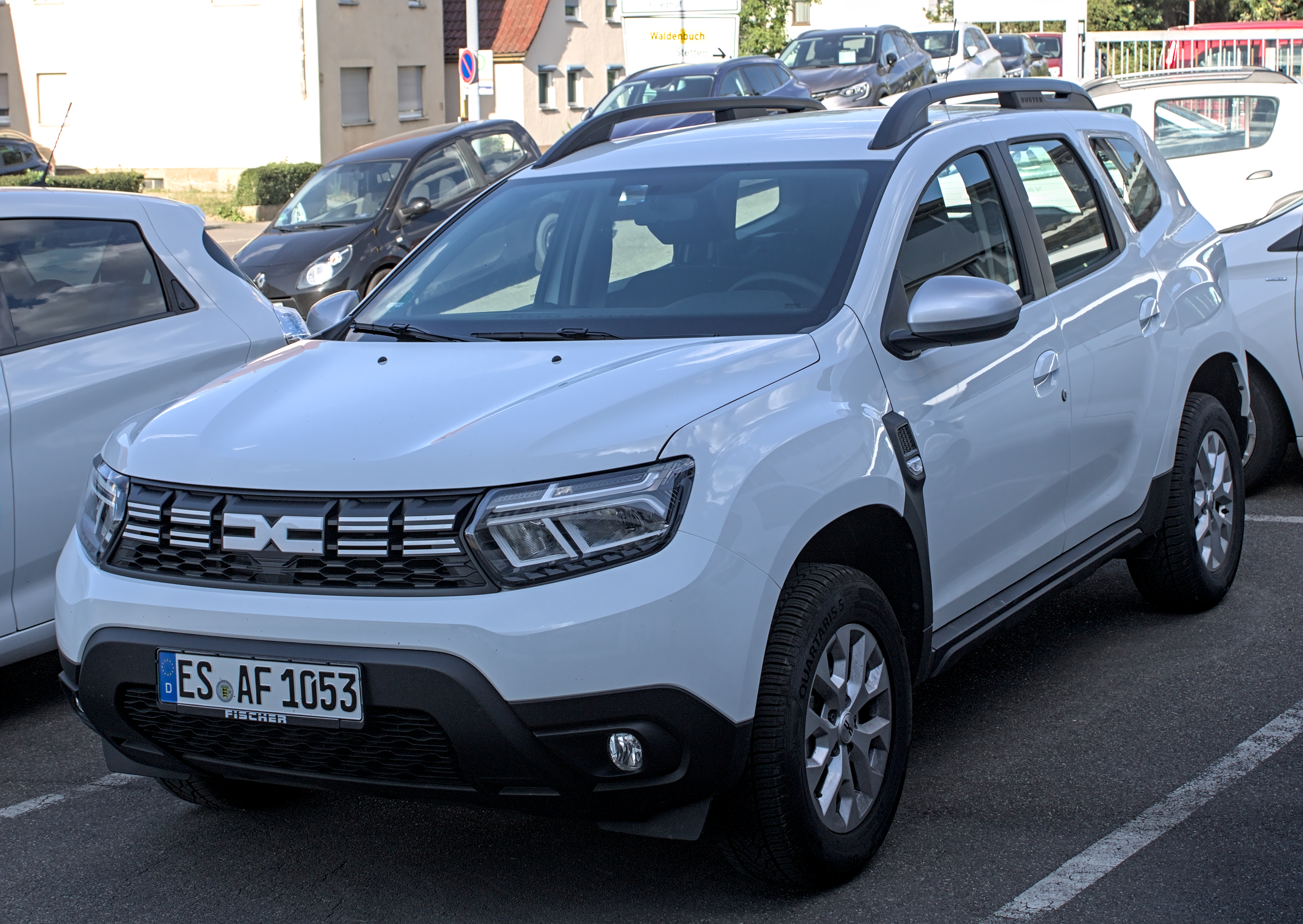
2023 Dacia Duster

In June 2022, like the entire Dacia range, the Duster received a slight update featuring the brand's new logo. The grille was redesigned, the steering wheel was updated with the new logo, and all the other badges were replaced. The air vents were also updated to the same design as the Renault Duster on left-hand drive versions. The facelift also applied to the Commercial version, sold only in the United Kingdom.

==== Duster Pick-up ====
The Dacia Duster Pick-up facelift, manufactured by Romturingia and approved by the brand, is available in France from November 2022 from the specialist Borel.

=== Special editions ===
==== Techroad ====
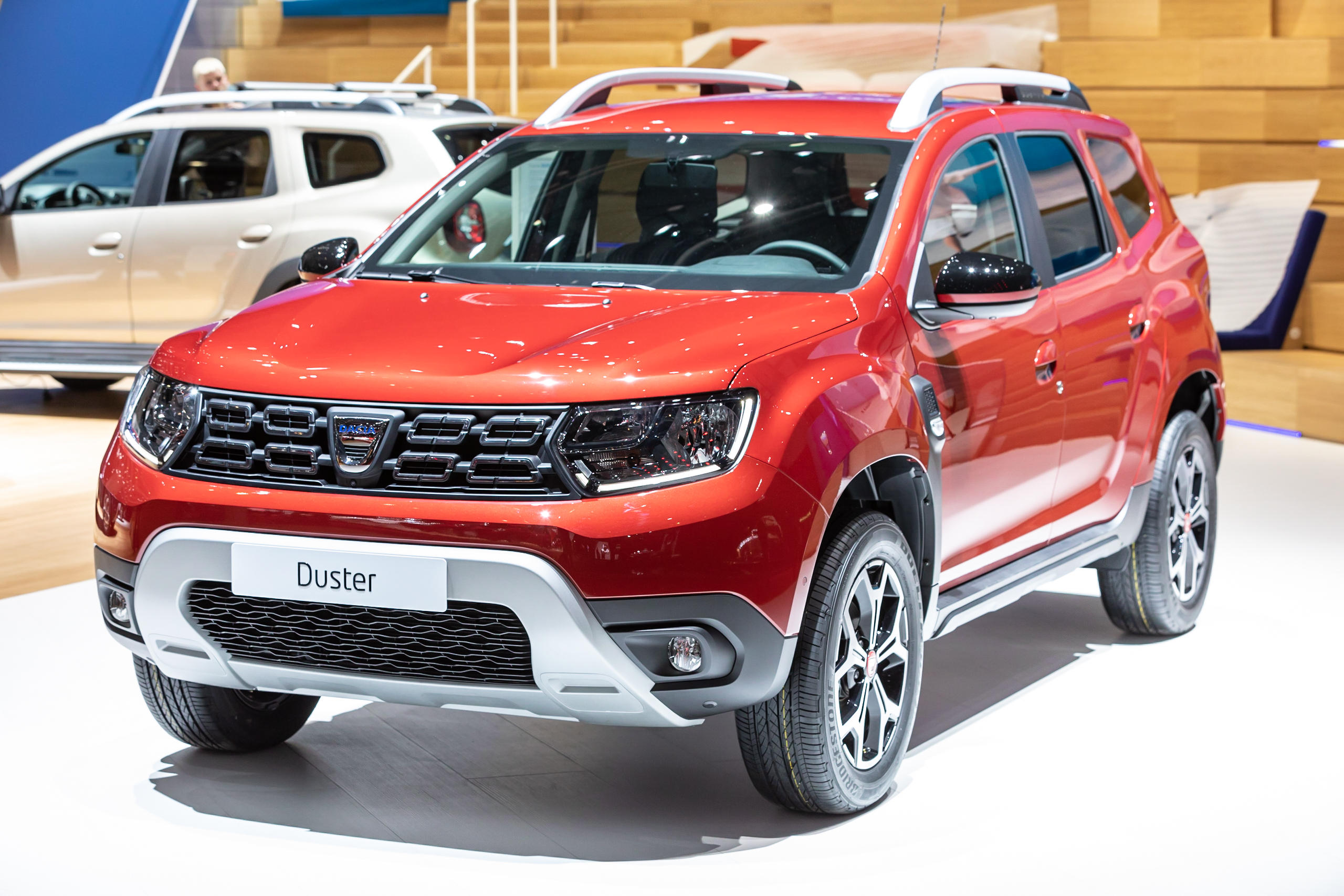
Duster Ultimate at the 2019 Geneva International Motor Show

Dacia presented the special edition in March 2019 at the Geneva Motor Show, being launched under the names Charisma or Ultimate in some markets, and in Romania it was known as Techroad.

==== Black Collector ====
Launched in September 2019, the Dacia Duster Black Collector Edition was an exclusive version for France, sold exclusively online.

==== SE Twenty ====
In January 2020, Dacia celebrated two decades of Renault ownership by launching the SE Twenty special edition for the Sandero Stepway, Logan MCV Stepway and Duster.

==== Duster Extreme ====
Unveiled in August 2021, the Dacia Duster Extreme is a limited edition, with prices starting at 21,900 euros, which was launched in January 2022.

It was discontinued after the June 2022 update, but was brought back in October of that year.

==== Duster "Mat Edition" ====
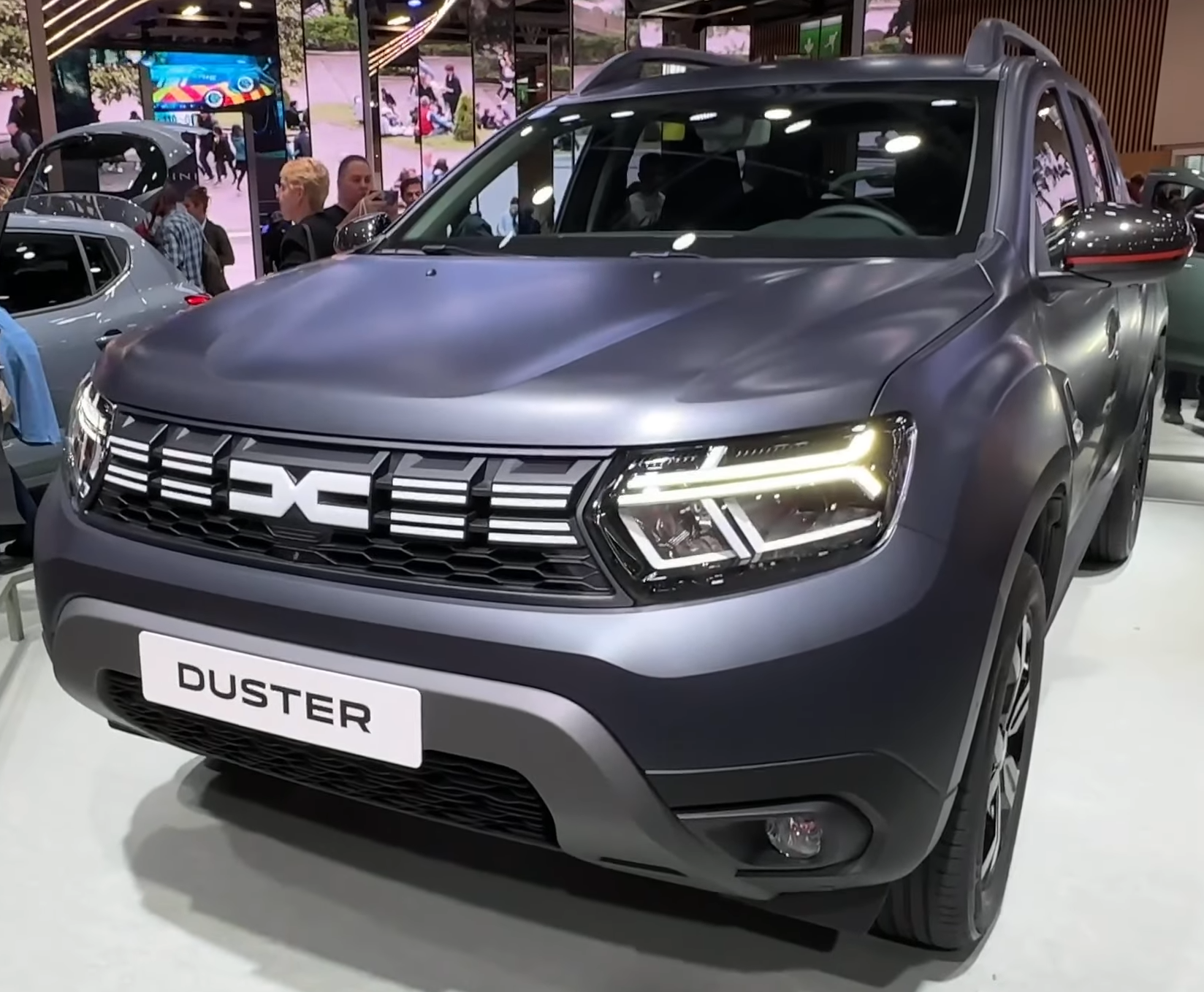
2023 Duster "Mat Edition"

A new special edition called the "Mat Edition" was presented at the 2022 Paris Motor Show, with orders open from the beginning of 2023. The model is distinguished by a special matte gray body colour and is equipped as standard with all available options. It is powered by the 1.3-litre TCe 150 petrol engine producing 148 bhp (110 kW), mated to an EDC automatic gearbox.

=== Discontinuation ===
The second generation Dacia Duster was removed from the Romanian configurator website in early 2024, production of its replacement starting in late 2023, offering customers the possibility to configure the newly-launched third generation in March of the same year.

It was removed from Dacia's range because of General Safety Regulation 2 (GSR 2) emissions and safety regulations pack. The car couldn't comply to these regulations packages, due to the fact that it was produced from 2018 with no major changes to the bodywork or the powerplants and the engines at the time were complying with the then-current Euro 6 emission standards, soon to be replaced by new standards requiring Euro 7 by 2025. Production did continue until June, with the stock sold by dealers until July. The last orders were in particular for the stalwart 1.5 dCi diesel engine, as the third generation car did not offer it in the configurator, being replaced by the HYBRID 140 engine used in the Jogger since itself was launched in 2021.

== Third generation (P1310; 2023) ==
Third generation
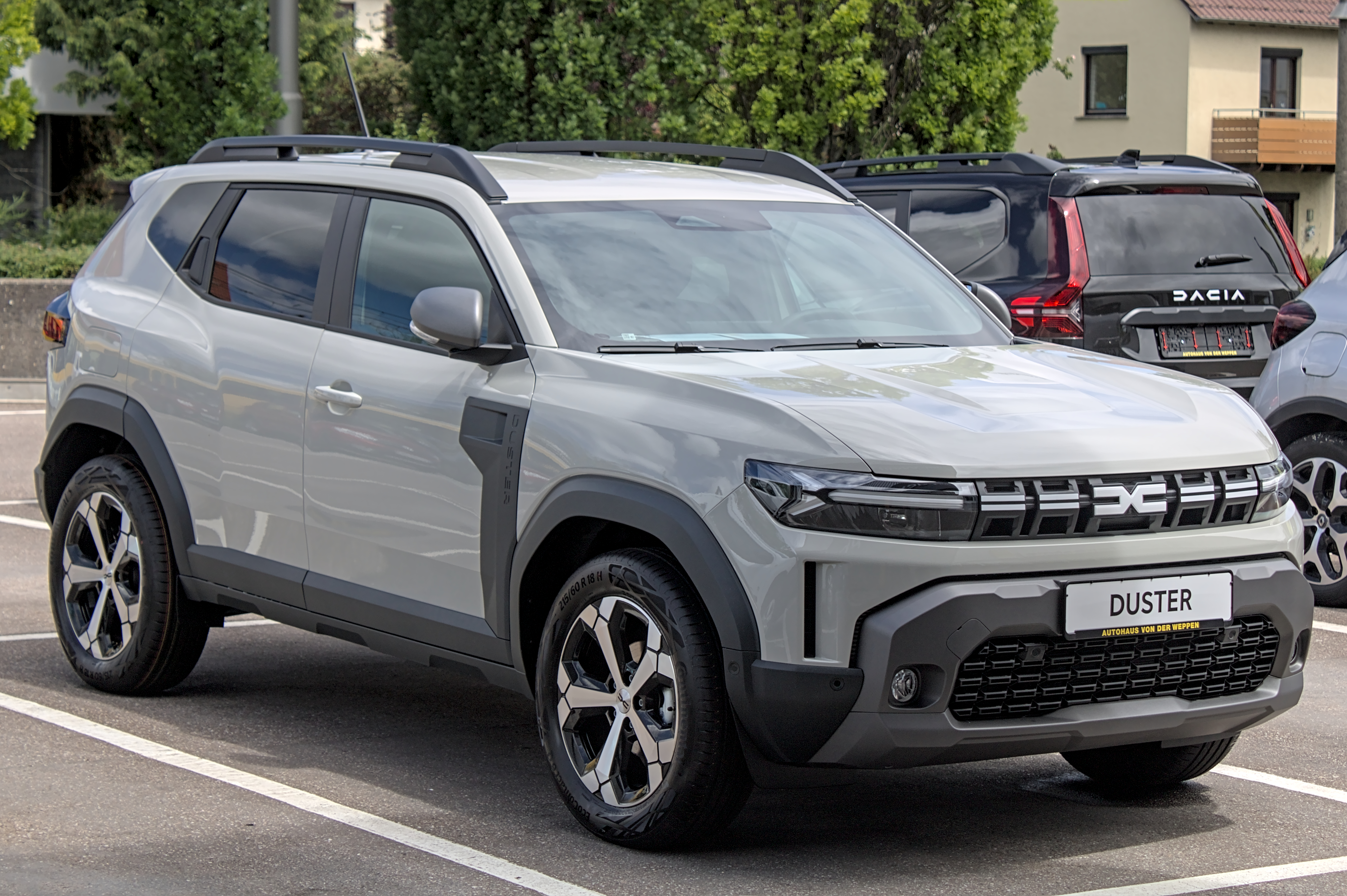
- Dacia Duster

Overview
- Model code: P1310
- Also called: Renault Duster
- Production: December 2023 – present (Romania); November 2024 – present (Turkey); March 2026 – present (India)
- Assembly: Romania: Mioveni; Turkey: Bursa (Oyak-Renault); India: Chennai (Renault Nissan India)
- Designer: Eduard Grigoroiu (head of the design team); David Durand (design director)

Body and chassis
- Body style: 5-door crossover SUV
- Platform: Renault–Nissan CMF-B LS; RGMP (Renault Group Modular Platform (India)
- Related: Nissan Tekton; Dacia Bigster; Renault Boreal; Renault Niagara; Dacia Logan; Dacia Sandero / Renault Kardian; Dacia Jogger

Powertrain
- Engine: Petrol / LPG: 1.0 L ECO-G I3 turbo Petrol hybrid: 1.2 L HR12DDV I3 turbo (mild hybrid); 1.3 L H5Ht I4 turbo 1.6 L H4M I4 (Hybrid 140); 1.8 L Horse HR18 HEV I4 (Hybrid 155); Petrol; 1.0L Turbo 100 I3 turbo 1.3L Turbo 160 I4 turbo Diesel: 1.5 L K9K I4
- Transmission: 7-speed EDC; 6-speed manual; EDC; 4-speed automatic (Hybrid 140)
- Battery: 0.9 kWh (TCe 130); 1.2 kWh lithium-ion (Hybrid 140)

Dimensions
- Wheelbase: 2,657 mm (104.6 in)
- Length: 4,343 mm (171.0 in)
- Width: 1,829 mm (72.0 in)
- Height: 1,660 mm (65.4 in)

=== History of development ===
The design and general technical specifications of the third generation Duster were previewed by the Bigster concept car, presented on 14 January 2021, during the Renaulution restructuring plan. It has been claimed that 90% of the concept will be similar to the production model.

In October 2020, Dacia confirmed that it is working on developing a replacement for the second generation Duster. It has also been reported that the new generation will not have any diesel engine options. During 2023, multiple camouflaged prototypes were spotted on public roads being tested before the official launch. Also, authorized sources within Dacia stated in June 2023 that production of pre-production models had begun in preparation for mass production.

The unveiling took place on 29 November 2023 in Portugal, with a public launch scheduled for the Geneva International Motor Show in February 2024. Prior to this, photos of the exterior and even a promotional trailer were leaked online 2 days before the official introduction.

Orders in Europe opened at the beginning of 2024, with deliveries beginning between May and June 2024.

The third-generation Duster is marketed under the Renault marque in India, Ukraine, South America, Australia, New Zealand, Turkey and Egypt The third-generation Duster platform will also spawn many derivatives in different markets, such as a larger SUV named the Dacia Bigster, a coupe SUV named the Dacia Striker, and a half-ton pickup truck previewed as the Renault Niagara Concept.

The third-generation was unveiled in India on 26 January 2026 after a 4-year hiatus, since the first generation Duster was sold. The India-spec Duster will come with a strong-hybrid petrol engine. The powertrain pairs a 109 hp 1.8-litre four-cylinder petrol engine with a 49 hp electric motor and a 20 hp hybrid starter generator (HSG), backed by a 1.4kWh (280 V) battery, taking the total system output to 160 hp and 172Nm. However, this powertrain will be introduced in India by Diwali 2026.

The third-generation Duster is also available with a 1.3-litre turbo-petrol engine that produces 163 hp and 280Nm, as well as a 1.0-litre turbo-petrol engine that produces 100 hp and 160Nm. The bigger turbocharged engine is paired with either a 6-speed manual or a 6-speed DCT, while the smaller engine comes with a 6-speed manual gearbox only.

The Renault Duster Hybrid E-Tech 160 was launched in India on 17 October 2026, with introductory ex-showroom prices ranging from ₹16.99 lakh to ₹19.49 lakh. It is powered by a 1.8-litre petrol strong-hybrid powertrain that produces 158 bhp and has an ARAI-certified fuel efficiency of 29 km/l.

=== Exterior ===
Featuring a more rugged and boxier exterior design with a new Y-shaped light signature on the optical units, it was designed under lead designer David Durand. Also up front is a large plastic skid plate and plastic cladding on the wheel arches, and the rear door handles are integrated into the C-pillar.

In total, 20% of the plastic used in the Duster III will be recycled, a material called Starkle introduced by the Manifesto concept, that will have a non-homogeneous composition, not being painted. It will also be larger in size compared to the previous generation.

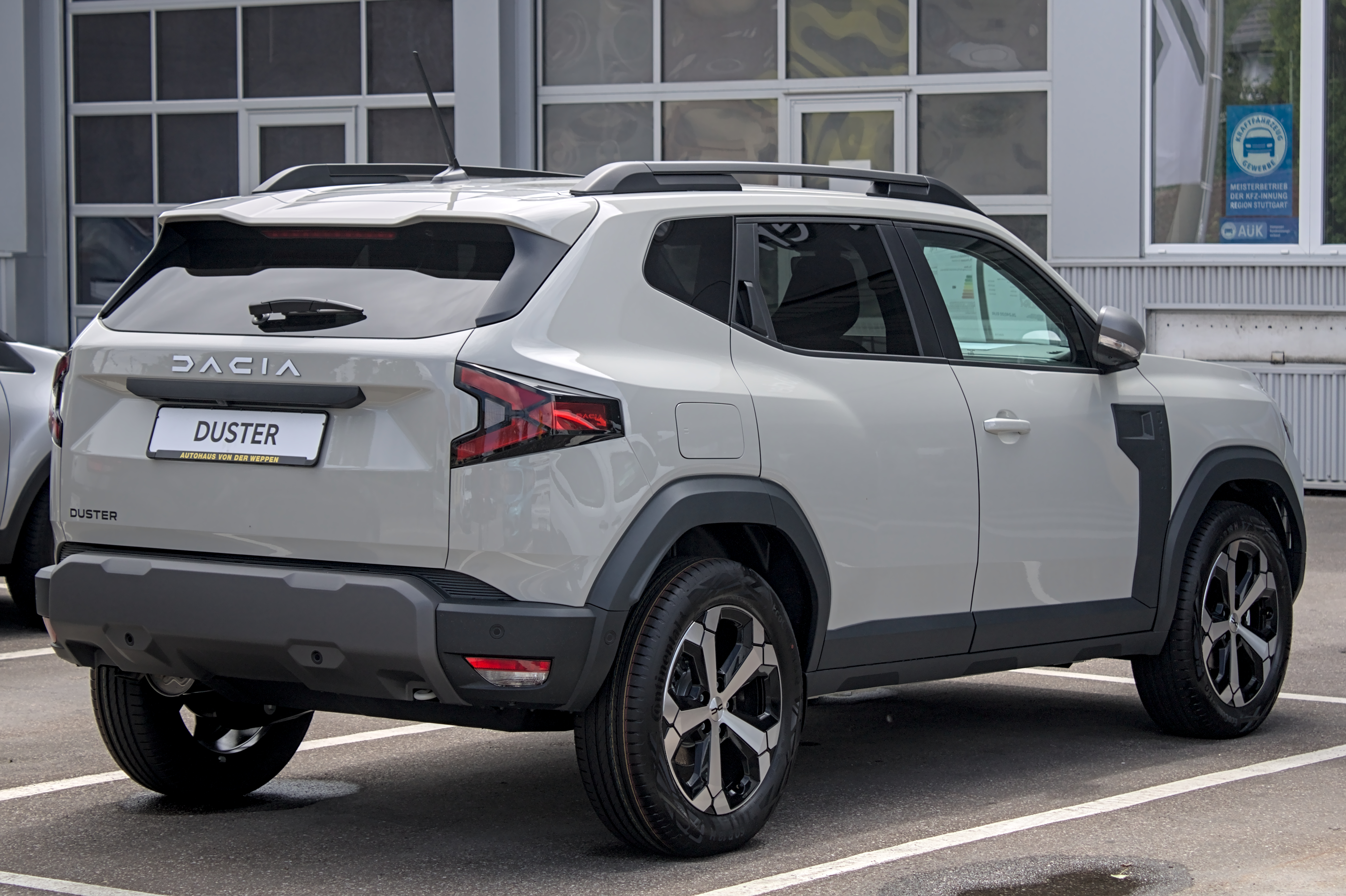
Rear View

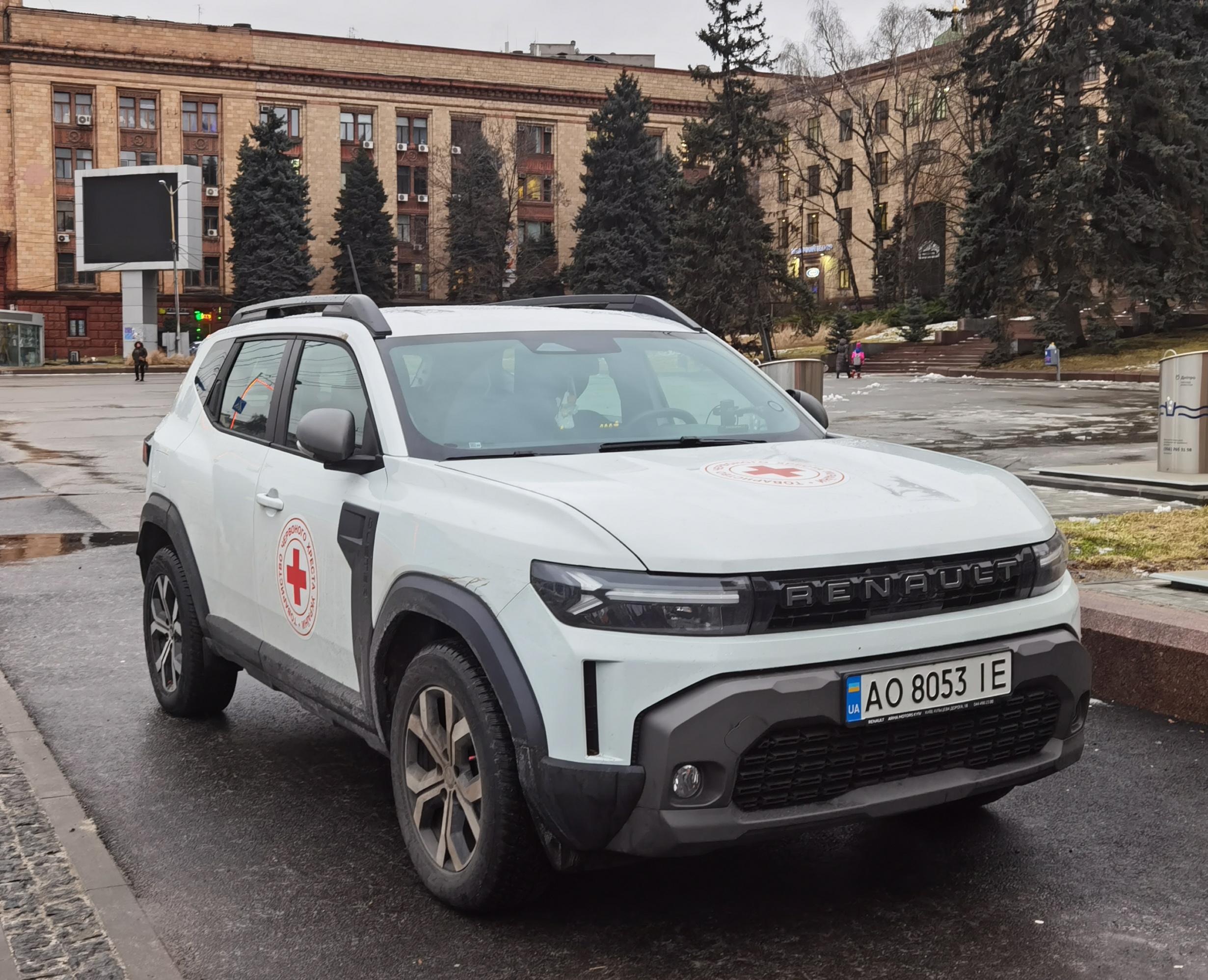
Renault Duster (Ukraine)

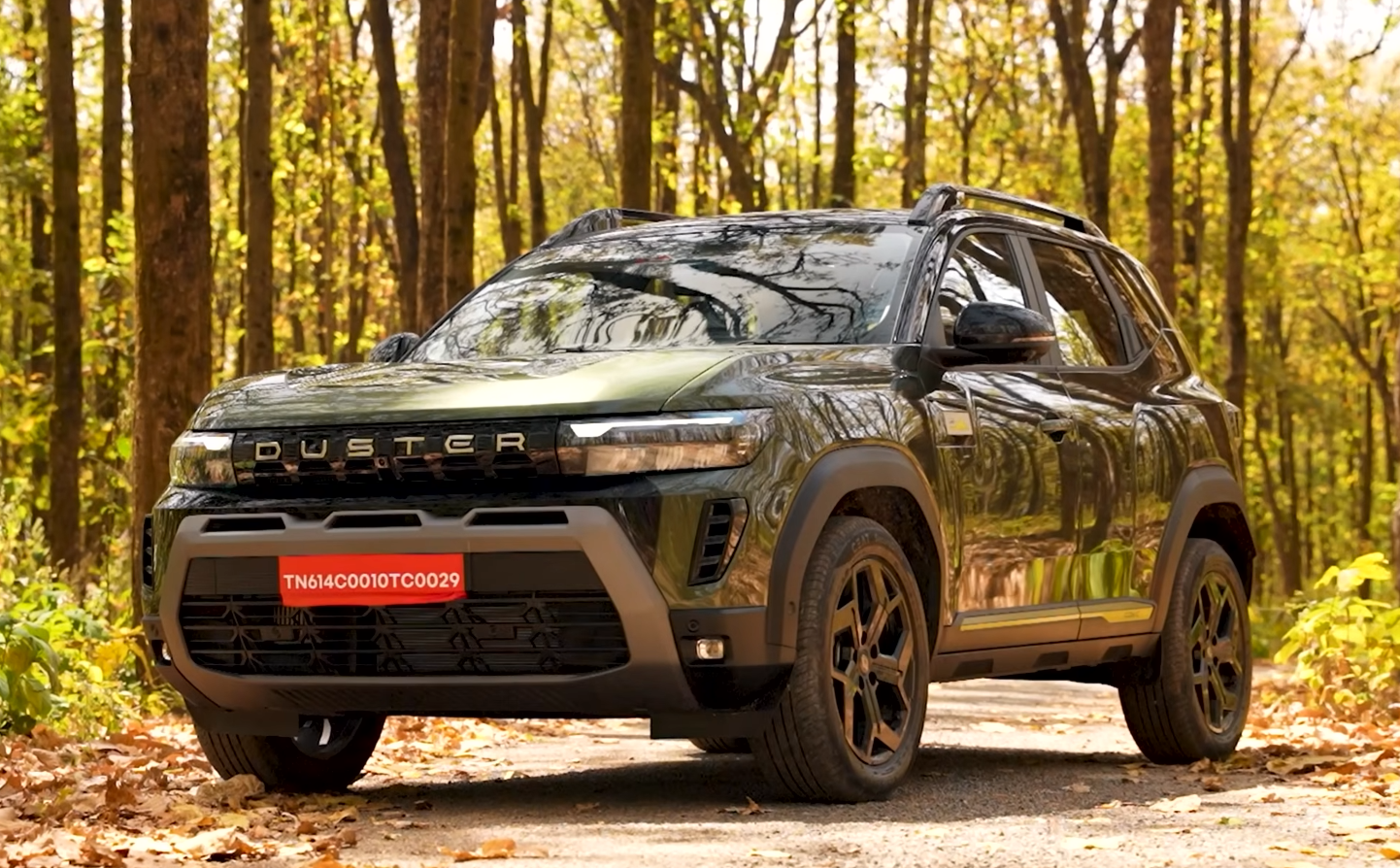
2026 Renault Duster Iconic (India)

=== Interior ===
The interior, also inspired by the Bigster, includes a new steering wheel and 10.1-inch central touchscreen, but also for the first time a 7-inch digital instrument cluster. The system includes Apple CarPlay and Android Auto wireless connectivity, plus a reversing camera.

The loading volume of the trunk has increased to 472 lt, 6% more than the old model. Also in the back, it can be offered with an optional Sleep Pack, which comes with a folding double bed accompanied by a table and storage area.

With the Duster, Dacia is launching a new accessory system called Youclip, composed of a series of square-shaped supports positioned throughout the car, each capable of withstanding around 8 kg (18 lb) of force.

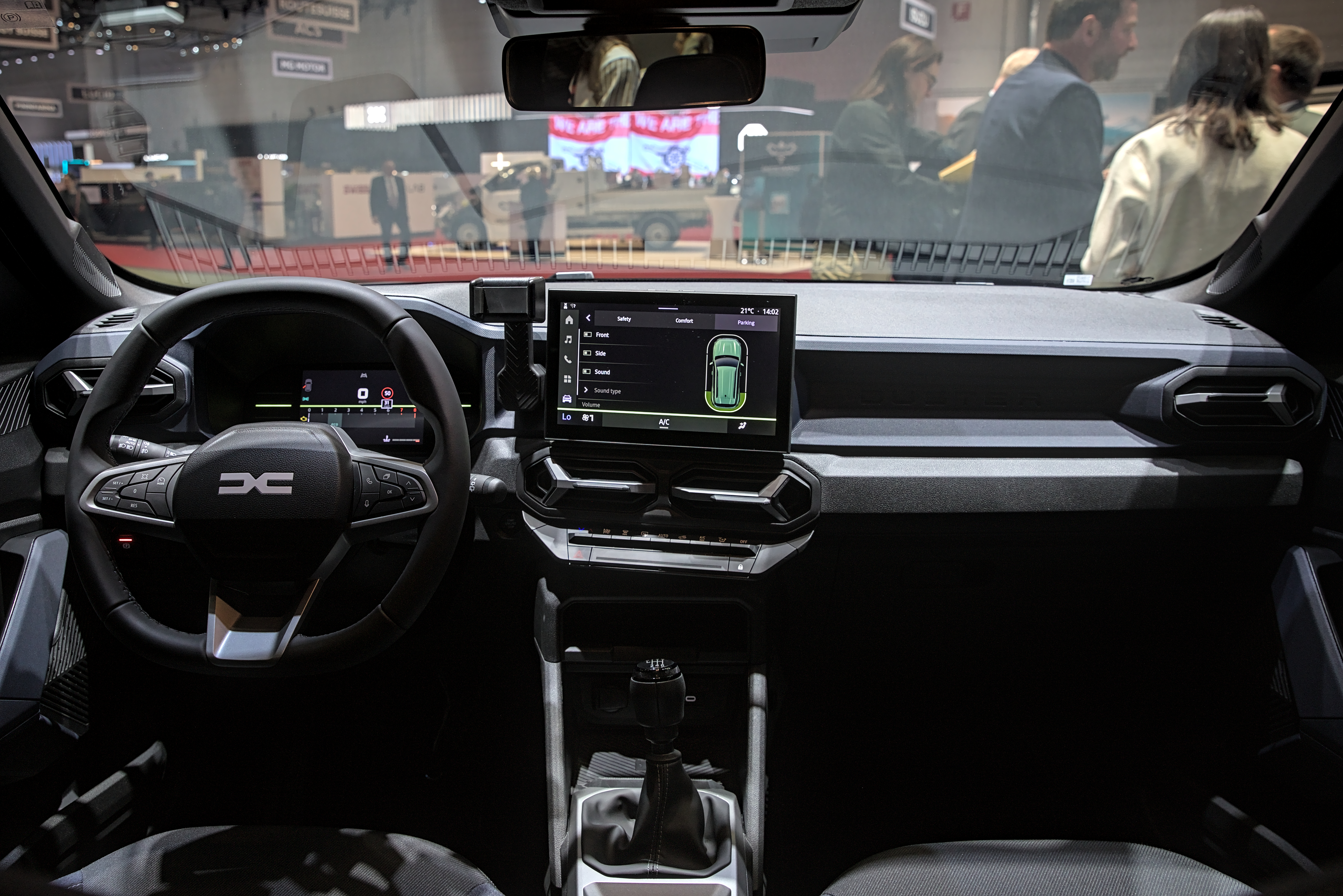
Interior (Dacia Duster)

=== Trim levels ===
There are four trim levels for the new Duster: Essential, Expression, Journey and Extreme. The top trim level is the Extreme, which comes with copper-coloured accents on the mirrors, badges and interior pieces. In Turkey, the new Duster is offered in Evolution and Techno trim levels.

=== Features ===
Developed on the CMF-B platform, shared with the Logan, Sandero and Jogger, the third generation is available for the first time with a mild-hybrid and full-hybrid powertrain, along with a bi-fuel option.

The model will benefit from a new multi-link rear axle (which will be found on the upcoming R5, R4 and Alpine A290) and a new electronic architecture called Sweet 400. This allows the arrival of the necessary driving aids to comply with the GSR.2 standard that will enter effective 1 July 2024. It is therefore equipped with automatic emergency braking with pedestrian and two-wheeler detection, traffic sign recognition with overspeed alert, lane keep warning and alert, drowsiness monitoring, rear park assist and emergency stop signal, with cruise control/cruise limiter being standard on all versions, as is automatic low-beam headlamps.

The optional 4×4 version has five selectable driving modes (Auto, Snow, Mud/Sand, Off-Road and Eco) and a ground clearance of up to 217 mm (8.5 in), compared to the 4x2 version which has a lower ground clearance of 209 mm (8.2 in).

=== Powertrain ===
The engines equipped on the Duster, as well as the rest of the Dacia range, will be produced by Horse Romania SA.

Engine	Years	Code	Displacement	Configuration	Power	Torque	Drivetrain	Battery	Notes
Petrol:
1.0 TCe 100	2026–present	H4Dt	999 cc (61.0 cu in)	I3 turbo	102 PS; 75 kW (101 hp)	160 N⋅m	FWD	–	Available exclusively in India. Complies with Bharat Stage 6 emission standards.
1.3 TCe 150	2025–present	H5Ht	1,332 cc (81.3 cu in)	I4 turbo	150 PS (110 kW; 148 hp)	–	FWD	–	Available only in selected markets, including Turkey. Complies with Euro 6c emission standards in Australia, Ukraine and Saudi Arabia.
1.3 TCe 160	2026–present	HR13DDT	1,332 cc (81.3 cu in)	I4 turbo	164 PS; 121 kW (162 hp)	280 N⋅m	FWD	–	Available exclusively in India. Complies with Bharat Stage 6 emission standards.
Petrol / LPG:
1.0 ECO-G 100	2023–2025	H4Dt	999 cc (61.0 cu in)	I3 turbo	100 PS (74 kW; 99 hp)	–	FWD	–	Euro 6d compliant.
1.2 ECO-G 120	2025–present	HR12	1,199 cc (73.2 cu in)	I3 turbo	120 PS (88 kW; 118 hp)	–	FWD	–	Replaced the ECO-G 100.
Petrol hybrid:
1.2 Mild Hybrid 130	2023–2025	HR12	1,199 cc (73.2 cu in)	I3 turbo	130 PS (96 kW; 128 hp)	–	FWD / 4WD	48 V, 0.9 kWh	Euro 6d compliant.
1.2 Mild Hybrid 140	2025–present	HR12	1,199 cc (73.2 cu in)	I3 turbo	140 PS (103 kW; 138 hp)	–	FWD	48 V, 0.8 kWh	Replaced the Mild Hybrid 130.
1.6 Hybrid 140	2023–2025	H4M	1,598 cc (97.5 cu in)	I4	93 PS (68 kW; 92 hp); Combined: 140 PS (103 kW; 138 hp)	–	FWD	1.2 kWh	Euro 6d compliant.
1.8 Hybrid 155	2025–present	N7HEV (also marketed as H5P260)	1,793 cc (109.4 cu in)	I4	110 PS (81 kW; 108 hp); Combined: 155 PS (114 kW; 153 hp)	–	FWD	1.4 kWh	Replaced the Hybrid 140. Adaptive cruise control is available as standard on the Journey trim and optional on the Extreme trim.
Petrol hybrid / LPG:
1.2 TCe Hybrid-G 150	2025–present	HR12	1,199 cc (73.2 cu in)	I3 turbo	140 PS (103 kW; 138 hp); Combined: 155 PS (114 kW; 153 hp)	–	e4WD	48 V, 0.84 kWh	Equipped with a 31 PS (23 kW; 31 hp) electric motor mounted on the rear axle, paired with a two-speed gearbox.
Diesel:
1.5 dCi	2025–present	K9K	1,461 cc (89.2 cu in)	I4 turbodiesel	115 PS (85 kW; 113 hp)	–	FWD	–	Available only in Moldova, Ukraine and Morocco.

=== Other models ===
Along with the LWB Bigster, there are also reports of a pick-up variant (codename H1312) and a coupe variant (codename D1312), both for the South American market. In September 2025, Dacia announced a new pickup variant for Romania, and a van variant for the UK.

=== Nissan Tekton ===
Nissan Tekton, based on the CM-F platform and sharing underpinnings with the Duster will be released in India markets.

The name "Tekton" is derived from Greek word meaning "craftsman" or "architect".

It is a successor to the D15 Nissan Kicks sold in India and some other markets.

=== Safety ===
Being developed on the Renault CMF architecture, it will offer improved crash safety and driving assistance aids. It will not qualify for a five-star ANCAP rating in Australia.

Euro NCAP test results Dacia Duster 1.6 Hybrid (LHD) (2024)
Test	Points	%
Overall:	3 /5 stars	
Adult occupant:	28.1	70%
Child occupant:	41.6	84%
Pedestrian:	38.2	60%
Safety assist:	10.3	57%

ANCAP test results Renault Duster 2WD variants (2024, aligned with Euro NCAP)
Test	Points	%
Overall:	3 /5 stars	
Adult occupant:	28.15	70%
Child occupant:	42.42	86%
Pedestrian:	38.20	60%
Safety assist:	10.46	58%

Bharat NCAP test results Renault Duster (2026, based on Latin NCAP 2016)
Test	Score	Stars
Adult occupant protection	30.49/32.00	5 /5 stars
Child occupant protection	45.00/49.00	5 /5 stars

=== Production and sales ===
Production started by the end of 2023 at the Mioveni plant, with sales expected to start by spring 2024. The long-wheelbase variant, the Bigster, started production at the same plant in 2025, as the head of Dacia Romania stated.

It has been announced that the model will be offered for sale in Europe, but also under the Renault brand in India (where the first generation was also sold), and for the first time in Australia from 2025, as confirmed by the managing director of Renault Australia, Glen Sealey.

== Motorsport ==
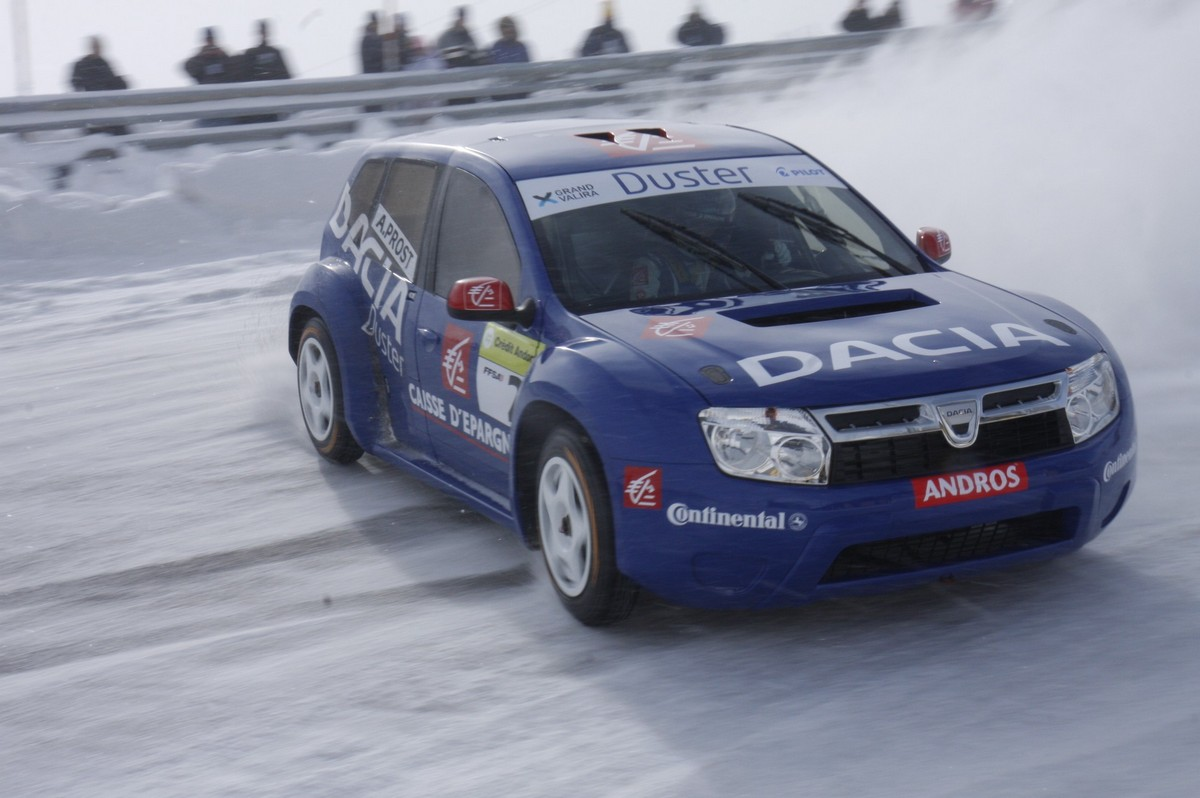
The Duster race car during the Andorra round of the Andros Trophy

A competition version of the Duster, fitted with a 350 hp (261 kW) V6 petrol engine and driven by Alain Prost, took part in the 2009–2010 edition of the French ice racing championship Andros Trophy, finishing in second place at the end of the season.

In 2010, the Duster participated in the Rallye Aicha des Gazelles, being first in the crossover class. The two Dacia teams successfully finished the Rallye on board the Duster: Dounia and Isabelle (Team 315 - Dacia) were first in the general ranking, while Nathalie and Dorothée (Team 316 - Dacia) finished in 5th place (out of 8 teams competing in the class).

In 2011, Dacia announced that they would be racing the Duster in the "Unlimited Class" of the Pikes Peak International Hill Climb. The Dacia Duster 'No Limit' was powered by an 850 bhp version of the VR38DETT engine, used in the Nissan GT-R, mated to a six-speed sequential transmission. The car was tuned by Tork Engineering, Sodemo and Renault Sport and was driven by three-time Trophée Andros winner Jean-Phillipe Dayraut.

In 2013, two Renault Duster prototypes took part in the Dakar Rally, which took place in Peru, Argentina and Chile. They were powered by 3.5-litre V6 engines, developing over 300 hp (224 kW), and were driven by Emiliano Spataro and José García, with Benjamin Lozada and Javier Mauricio as co-drivers.

For the 2015 and 2016 editions of the Dakar Rally the Renault Dusters were significantly changed and now feature a Nissan VK50VE V8 engine, SADEV gearbox, Reiger shock absorbers and Powerbrake 6-piston calipers.

=== Dakar results ===
Year	Class	Driver	Co-Driver	Result	Stages
2013	Car	(Argentina) Emiliano Spataro	(Argentina) Benjamín Lozada	DNF	0
2013	Car	(Argentina) José Francisco García	(Argentina) Mauricio Javier Malano	29th	0
2014	Car	(Argentina) Emiliano Spataro	(Argentina) Benjamín Lozada	14th	0
2014	Car	(Argentina) José Francisco García	(Argentina) Mauricio Javier Malano	DNF	0
2015	Car	(Argentina) Emiliano Spataro	(Argentina) Benjamín Lozada	21st	0
2015	Car	(Argentina) José Francisco García	(Argentina) Mauricio Javier Malano	DNF	0
2015	Car	(Argentina) Fernando Luis Bradach	(Argentina) Roberto Samuel Corvalan	DNF	0
2016	Car	(France) Christian Lavieille	(France) Jean Michel Polato	19th	0
2016	Car	(Argentina) Emiliano Spataro	(Argentina) Benjamín Lozada	18th	0
2016	Car	(Argentina) Fernando Luis Bradach	(Argentina) Roberto Samuel Corvalan	DNF	0
2017	Car	(Argentina) Emiliano Spataro	(Argentina) Benjamín Lozada	DNF	0
2017	Car	(Argentina) Facundo Ardusso	(Argentina) Gerardo Scicolone	22nd	0
2018	Car	(Portugal) Carlos Sousa	(France) Pascal Maimon	DNF	0
2018	Car	(Argentina) Emiliano Spataro	(Argentina) Santiago Hansen	DNF	0

== Concept cars ==
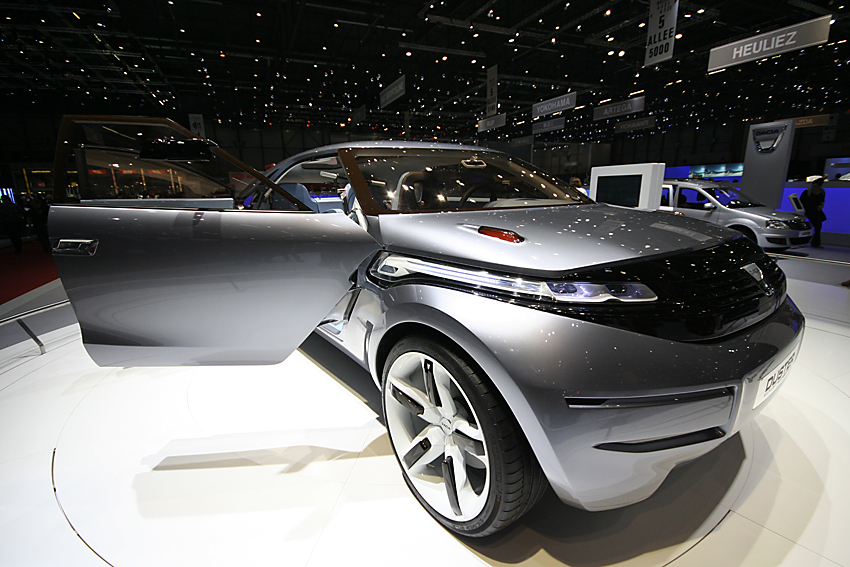
The Dacia Duster Concept at the 2009 Geneva Motor Show

Renault Design Central Europe presented a concept car named Dacia Duster at the 2009 Geneva Motor Show. This concept vehicle was a 5-door crossover SUV with rear suicide doors for easy access, that addressed the needs of families, with a roomy cabin in a compact package and a large 470 L (124 US gal; 103 imp gal) trunk. The Duster was based on the 2004 Nissan Qashqai concept, with many of the same features as the Nissan concept. These did not make it onto the production vehicle. The engine emission level was 139 grams of carbon dioxide per kilometer and it had a fuel consumption of 5.3 L/100 km (44 mpg_{‑US}; 53 mpg_{‑imp}). The Dacia Duster was the first concept car developed by Dacia, in collaboration with the Renault Design Technocentre. The Duster normally has four seats but can be converted into a two-seat car, the passenger seat slides under the driver's seat and the right back seat slides under the left back seat freeing an extra room of 2,000 L (71 cu ft) ideal for a bicycle.

The Duster concept car had a 1.5-litre inline-four diesel engine, equipped with Bosch Mono-Jetronic fuel injection producing 106 PS (78 kW; 105 hp) at 5400 rpm and 240 N⋅m (177 ft⋅lbf) at 2000 rpm of torque. It was a front-engine, two-wheel-drive or four-wheel-drive vehicle, based on the Nissan B platform. It could accelerate from 0 to 100 km/h (62 mph) in 9.6 seconds. If the model had been produced, its initial price would have been around 15,000 euro (US$18,750).

At the 2012 São Paulo Motor Show, Renault presented the DCross Concept, based on the production version of the Renault Duster. It was designed by Renault Design América Latina and was meant to "underline the robustness and all-terrains capability of the Duster". It featured a bright green and matte black paint scheme, a raised ride height, roof racks and a spare tire atop, but no other details were given.

Romania has demonstrated a combat version of the Duster, complete with armoring, a winch, and roof-mounted machine gun.

In October 2014, a double cab pick-up show car called Duster Oroch was presented by Renault at the São Paulo Motor Show. The concept car takes design clues from the DCross Concept, revealed at the previous edition of the event.

In 2016 Dacia revealed a concept 6x6 vehicle called the 'Dustruck', a portmanteau of Duster and truck in which a Duster body had been adapted to a truck type frame and may be powered by a V8 engine.

== Former use of the name ==
Dacia Duster was also the name used to sell the ARO 10 on some markets, such as the United Kingdom, during the 1980s and early 1990s. It was offered in soft-top roadster and 2-door estate variants.

== Sales ==
Year	Europe (Note: Europe: 2020 EU 27 + UK + Switzerland + Norway + Iceland)	Turkey	Russia	Mexico	Colombia	Brazil	India	
Year	Europe	Turkey	Russia	Mexico	Colombia	Brazil	Duster	Terrano
2010	57,438							
2011	134,001		40					
2012	101,452		47,344	8,464		46,897	23,731	
2013	88,082		83,702	10,994		50,224	51,411	7,390
2014	127,772		76,138	12,652		48,877	39,807	21,286
2015	125,416		43,923	10,213		34,199	24,172	10,670
2016	139,826		44,001	12,360		25,373	18,700	4,717
2017	145,682		43,828	10,919		17,791	15,158	3,035
2018	180,391		41,409	10,663		23,581	10,937	1,162
2019	220,167		39,031	7,521		26,093	8,974	429
2020	139,269	17,402	31,640	4,048		19,477	3,685	
2021	144,772	19,038	41,471	6,257	9,280	22,459	2,870	
2022	149,648	25,011		6,039	10,679	22,516		
2023		24,065		5,521	7,017	26,507		
2024	215,024	14,635 (2nd gen) + ? (3rd gen)				20,697		
2025						18,449		

== See also ==
- Dacia Spring
- Dacia Sandero
