= Tucumán Provincial Police =

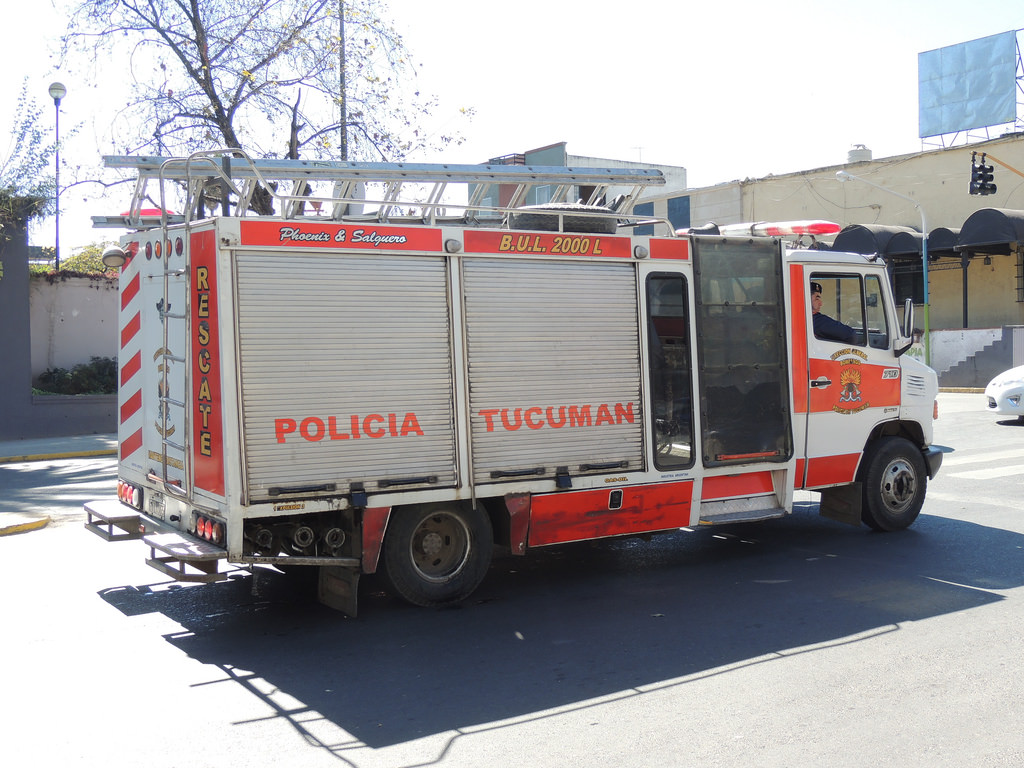
'Policía de Tucumán

The Policía de la Provincia de Tucumán (Tucumán Province Police; PPT) is an Argentine police agency, responsible for policing the Tucumán province.

== See also ==
- Argentine Federal Police
- Buenos Aires Police
- Buenos Aires Urban Guard
- Santa Fe Province Police
- Interior Security System
