= Buenos Aires Police =

Buenos Aires Police may refer to:

== Police Agencies ==
- Buenos Aires Provincial Police (Serving Buenos Aires Province).
- Buenos Aires City Police (Serving the Autonomous City of Buenos Aires).
- Buenos Aires Metropolitan Police (Old police department of the Autonomous City of Buenos Aires).
