= Buenos Aires Metropolitan Police =

Buenos Aires Metropolitan Police Policía Metropolitana de Buenos Aires
- Motto: Una policía integrada a la comunidad A police corp integrated to the community

Agency overview
- Formed: 2008
- Preceding agency: (None)
- Dissolved: 2017; 9 years ago
- Employees: 4,000

Jurisdictional structure
- Operations jurisdiction: Buenos Aires
- General nature: Local civilian police

Operational structure
- Elected officer responsible: Guillermo Montenegro, Minister of Security
- Agency executive: Horacio Giménez, Chief of Police
- Divisions: Security, Investigation, Scientific, Technical

Facilities
- Stations: 4

The Metropolitan Police was the police force under the authority of the Autonomous City of Buenos Aires until it merged with the city's division of the Argentine Federal Police by creating the Buenos Aires City Police in 2017. The force was created in 2010 and is composed of 1,850 officers, and is planned to expand to 16,000. Security in the city was concurrently the responsibility of the Metropolitan Police and the Argentine Federal Police.

The city government claims the force was based on the model of the British London Metropolitan Police and the New York Police Department. The force was intended to use high technology support and adopted a policy of zero tolerance.

== Structure and organization of the Metropolitan Police ==
The police was headed by a chief and a deputy chief. Both were appointed by the head of the executive branch of the city. There were four major departments, each headed by a director general:

- Public Security
- Investigations and Research
- Scientific and Technical
- Administration

Geographically, the force was divided into 15 precincts.

Of the 1,850 officers, 900 were used for patrolling the streets.

== Ranks ==
The Metropolitan Police used nine ranks, the highest being "Superintendent".

1. Officer
2. Senior Officer
3. Sub-Inspector
4. Inspector
5. Sub-Commissioner
6. Commissioner
7. Senior Commissioner
8. Commissioner-General
9. Superintendent

== Controversy ==
A lot of controversies surrounded Buenos Aires Metropolitan Police BAMP officers, primarily due to the department's "zero-tolerance" policy: many officers used to be violent against protesters and used excessive force. However, the department has managed to boost its reputation. However, the public opinion was more positive about the Metropolitan Police than Argentine Federal Police, and citizens tended to choose the Metropolitan Police over the Federal Police, due to high levels of corruption in the latter.

== See also ==
- Metropolitan Police
- Guardia Urbana de Buenos Aires
- Argentine Federal Police
- Buenos Aires Police
- Santa Fe Province Police
- Interior Security System
