= Nissan Tekton =

Subcompact crossover SUV

Overview
- Manufacturer: Nissan
- Production: July 2026 − present
- Assembly: India: Chennai (Renault Nissan Automotive India)

Body and chassis
- Class: Subcompact SUV (B-segment)
- Body style: 5-door crossover SUV
- Layout: Front-engine, front-wheel-drive
- Platform: RGMP (Renault Group Modular Platform)
- Related: Renault Duster; Dacia Bigster; Renault Boreal; Renault Niagara

Dimensions
- Wheelbase: 2,657 mm (104.6 in)
- Length: 4,348 mm (171.2 in)
- Width: 1,815 mm (71.5 in)
- Height: 1,674 mm (65.9 in)

Chronology
- Predecessor: Nissan Kicks (D15)

The Nissan Tekton is a subcompact crossover SUV to be produced by Nissan exclusively for India. It is based on the CMF-B platform shared with third-generation Dacia Duster, which will also be sold in India as Renault Duster.

The name "Tekton" is derived from the Greek word meaning "craftsman" or "architect".

== Overview ==
The Tekton was initially announced in March of 2024 as one of 2 cars to be introduced by Nissan in India by 2026 and as one of 4 models to be introduced by Nissan and alliance partner Renault in the region, with each brand launching 2 models respectively.

It is the first of four models that Nissan has planned to launch in India by 2026-27. The Tekton's launch will take place in the middle of 2026, with production planned to start in the first quarter of 2026. Pre-production models are already undergoing testing.

It competes with the Hyundai Creta, Kia Seltos, Toyota Urban Cruiser Hyryder, Suzuki Grand Vitara, Tata Sierra and Suzuki Victoris.

It was introduced in India on 9 July 2026.

The Nissan Tekton is offered in Visia, Visia+, Acenta, N-Connecta, Tekna and Tekna+ variants.

=== Design and features ===
The front of the Tekton uses C-shaped headlights and chrome trim on the grille. Both the front and rear bumpers use a rugged design with aluminum-style inserts around the intakes. The taillights' design is inspired by the Nissan Patrol/Armada, and full-width light bars are present at both the front and back. No details are present about the interior's design, except that the dashboard combines body-colored trim with gloss black and metal accents.

Carscoops initially stated that the Tekton's headlights, when the model was first teased,Nissan's senior design director, Ken Lee, has stated that the Tekton is intended to be a "baby Patrol" in terms of visual appeal.

The Tekton's interior is expected to use a fully digital driver's display, auto AC, ambient lighting, a premium sound system, a wireless smartphone charger, push-button engine start/stop, and a panoramic sunroof. Electronic stability control, an automatic braking system with electronic brakeforce distribution, and Level 2 ADAS capacity are expected to be utilized on the Tekton.

=== Powertrains ===
The Tekton is available with two powertrain options: a 1.0-litre engine delivering 100 hp (75 kW) and 116 N⋅m (86 lb⋅ft) of torque, paired with a 6-speed manual gearbox, and a more powerful 1.3-litre turbo-petrol engine delivering 163 hp (122 kW) and 280 N⋅m (207 lb⋅ft), available with either a 6-speed manual or a 6-speed DCT gearbox.

== Safety ==
Bharat NCAP test results Nissan Tekton (2026, based on Latin NCAP 2016)
Test	Score	Stars
Adult occupant protection	30.49/32.00	5 /5 stars
Child occupant protection	45.00/49.00	5 /5 stars
