= Jorge Alberto Palacios =

Argentine policeman

Jorge Alberto Palacios (April 7, 1949 – March 20, 2020), also known as "Fino" Palacios, was a controversial Argentine policeman.

== Career ==
Head of the Argentine Federal Police Anti-Terrorism Unit, in 2009 he was appointed by Mayor Mauricio Macri to lead the Metropolitan Police, the new police force of the Autonomous City of Buenos Aires. This designation was questioned by the public, because of charges levied on him. The appointment ended with his arrest on the charges below, in December 2009.

== Accusations and controversies ==
He was under indictment in the AMIA court case, "considered a necessary participant in the crime of concealment, author criminally responsible for the crime of abuse of authority and author of the crime of violation of evidence."

Previously he was prosecuted for the causes of repression and killing of protesters in 2001, which was finally acquitted by the Federal Chambers. He was also publicly linked to the murder of Axel Blumberg, the son of Juan Carlos Blumberg, although Palacios defended himself by saying that "is an invention, as reflected in the statements of the father" of the victim.

For his part, Palacios denies all allegations and claims that there is a "smear campaign" against him.

He was also controversial for his book Terrorismo en la aldea global (Terrorism in the global village), especially the bias of its analysis. In particular, he asserted that "Argentina was the theater of Marxist revolutionaries who sow violence and terror in the citizenry", but does not mention state-sponsored terrorism in Argentina at all.

=== Wiretapping scandal ===
In October 2009, Sergio Burstein, one of the leaders of the Jewish community who had led the opposition against the appointment of Fino Palacios as Chief of Police (because of his connections with the terrorist attack on the AMIA), he denounced in court was being spied on by the Police of the City of Buenos Aires. Shortly thereafter, the Justice observed that in fact, Burnstein was being spied upon by a band that would be part Fino and his successor Osvaldo Palacios Chamorro, a federal police lawyer and two judges from the Misiones Province.

The investigation revealed that the wiretapping victims included several political figures, both in the governing and opposition parties as well as businessmen, trade unionists and their families, including president Macri's father, Franco Macri, and his brother in law .

== See also ==
- Metropolitan Police (Buenos Aires)
- Buenos Aires wiretapping case
