= Buenos Aires wiretapping case =

The Buenos Aires wiretapping case refers to a scandal involving illegal wiretapping and intimidation, possibly for political purposes, made using government research structures and thought to be connected to the Argentine Federal Police (PFA) and the then newly created Metropolitan Police Force.

== Chronology ==
Sergio Burstein, one of the leaders of the Jewish community who had led the opposition against the appointment of Fino Palacios as Chief of Police of Buenos Aires, because of their connections to the 1994 AMIA bombing was warned by an anonymous phone call that one of his phone lines was being tapped. Soon thereafter, following an investigation the Justice determined that Burstein was, in fact, being spied upon by a rogue element of the PFA under the orders of Fino Palacios and his successor Osvaldo Chamorro, with the cooperation of Ciro James, a lawyer working with the federal police and two judges from the province of Misiones, among others.

The then president Mauricio Macri said that the case, headed by the judge Norberto Oyarbide, was an attempt by the opposition to frame him. Judge Sebastián Casanello cleared Macri from all charges, stating that there was no proof of president Macri's involvement in the case.
