= Renault Geely do Brasil =

Brazilian automobile manufacturer

Renault do Brasil S.A.
- Type: Subsidiary
- Industry: Automotive
- Founded: 1997
- Headquarters: São José dos Pinhais, Brazil
- Key people: Ricardo Gondo (CEO)
- Production output: ▲291,346 vehicles (2018)
- Revenue: ▲ R$13.19 billion (2018)
- Operating income: ▼ R$537.37 million (2018)
- Net income: ▼ R$335.92 million (2018)
- Total assets: ▲ R$8 billion (2018)
- Total equity: ▲ R$2.04 billion (2018)
- Number of employees: 6,300 (2012)
- Parent: Renault (73.57%); Geely Auto (21.29%); Zhejiang Geely Holding (5.11%)
- Subsidiaries: Renault do Brasil Comércio e Participações Ltda. (automotive parts selling)
- Website: renault.com.br

Renault Geely do Brasil (Brazilian Portuguese pronunciation: [ʁeˈno d͡ʒiˈli du bɾaˈziw]), formerly Renault do Brasil or Renault do Brasil Automoveis, is the Brazilian subsidiary of the French car manufacturer Renault and Chinese manufacturer Geely. It was established in 1997, and is Brazil's fifth largest automaker by sales. In 2012, Brazil was the second largest market for Renault.

== History ==
Renault has been present in Brazil since the 1960s, initially through a partnership with the American company Willys Overland, which produced under license cars of the French automaker. At the end of 1961, Willys introduced the Interlagos, a copy of the Alpine A110, producing also other models, like the Dauphine and the Dauphine Gordini, until 1968. That year Willys Overland sold its operations to Ford do Brasil, which inherited the "project M". This project, developed by the Renault and Willys partnership, resulted in the launch of the Ford Corcel, a car whose style can be considered, roughly, an Americanized version of the Renault 12 with a CH1 engine.

In the 1970s, Brazil ended car imports and Renault did not return until 1992, when the company's Argentinean and Brazilian operations were taken by the holding company COFAL SA. In 1997, Renault retook the control of its operations in Argentina and Brazil. In Brazil, Renault formed the subsidiary Renault do Brasil Automoveis. In 1998, it opened the Ayrton Senna manufacturing complex in São José dos Pinhais, Curitiba. With the aim of financing the construction of the facilities Renault agreed to give the State of Paraná a 40% stake in exchange of US$1.2 billion. This stake would be mostly returned to Renault after seven years. Despite its success, the agreement found some political dissensus.

The first Renault cars manufactured in Brazil were the Scenic and the Clio (the production of the latter was moved to Renault Argentina in 2007). The company also produced the Megane in sedan and estate versions, which ended between 2010 and 2012. Later, it entered into production the Sandero, the Logan and the Duster.

=== Partnership with Geely ===
In February 2024, Renault and Geely announced a framework agreement to expand their strategic collaboration in the production and sale of electric vehicles in Brazil. Under the agreement, Geely Holding Group will invest in Renault do Brasil, acquiring a minority stake in the company. This investment will grant Geely access to localized production, sales, and service resources in Brazil, enhancing its presence in the region.

In June 2025, Geely Auto, Geely Holding and Renault announced to establish joint venture to manufacture electric vehicle in Brazil. The JV company would be owned 73.57% by Renault, 21.29% by Geely Auto, 5.11% by Geely Holding, and 0.03% by an independent third party.

In November 2025, Geely formally acquires a 26.4% stake in Renault do Brasil, with Renault Group remaining the majority shareholder and continuing to consolidate the entity in its accounts. Renault do Brasil will produce Geely Auto branded vehicles alongside Renault vehicles at the Ayrton Senna plant in São José dos Pinhais, Paraná. On 19th November, Renault and Geely announced to invest 3.8 billion reais (US$ 714 million) to the joint venture and renamed it to Renault Geely do Brasil.

== Operations ==
The Ayrton Senna complex, with 2.5 million square meters, consists of a passenger car plant (bodywork and assembly) opened in 1998, an engine plant, Mecanica Mercosul, opened in 1999, and a light commercial vehicle (LCV) plant, operated jointly with Nissan.

In August 2011, Renault announced an investment plan of R$1.5 billion for expanding the production to 320,000 vehicles by 2015. In 2011, the Brazilian growth of Renault was seven times bigger than the market average, with 194,300 cars sold and a market share of 5.7%. That year the company produced 256,200 cars and vans and 332,000 engines.

A 41% of the cars, engines and parts produced are exported, with destinations such as the Renault subsidiaries in Argentina (22%), Colombia (13%), Romania and Mexico (4%).

On 2 August 2012, Renault announced its plans to expand Mecanica Mercosul's production output with 25% by 2013.

=== Renault Design America Latina ===
In April 2008, Renault opened in São Paulo its first design center in the Americas. It designed the Sand'Up concept, which was unveiled at the 2008 São Paulo International Motor Show, It also conceived the Sandero Stepway concept in 2010 and collaborated in the Duster design. The center also designed the D-Cross (a Duster-based concept), which was unveiled at the 2012 São Paulo International Motor Show. The design studio also modified the production Sandero and Logan to adapt them to the local markets.

== Product ==
=== Current Renault models ===
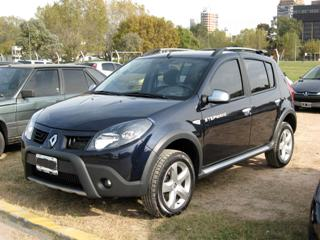
A Sandero Stepway manufactured at São José dos Pinhais

- Renault Master III (2012–present)
- Renault Duster (October 2011–present)
- Renault Oroch (2015–present)
- Renault Kwid (2017–present)
- Renault Kardian (2023–present)
- Renault Boreal (2025–present)
- Renault Koleos (2025–present)

=== Discontinued Renault models ===
- Renault Clio II (October 1999–2007)
- Renault Scénic (January 1999–July 2010)
- Renault Mégane II (2006–circa 2012)
- Renault Master II (2001–2012)
- Renault Logan I (2007–2013)
- Renault Logan II (2013–2025)
- Renault Sandero I (2007–2014)
- Renault Sandero II (2014–2025)
- Renault Captur (2016–2023)

== Ownership ==
As of 2011, 80.29 percent of the company was controlled indirectly by Renault through the holding Compagnie Financière pour L'Amérique Latine (COFAL), which also had shares in Renault Argentina and is mainly owned by the automaker. A 19.56 percent was owned directly by Renault of France. The State of Paraná held the remaining shares.
