= Renault Argentina =

Argentine motor vehicle manufacturing company

Renault Argentina S.A.

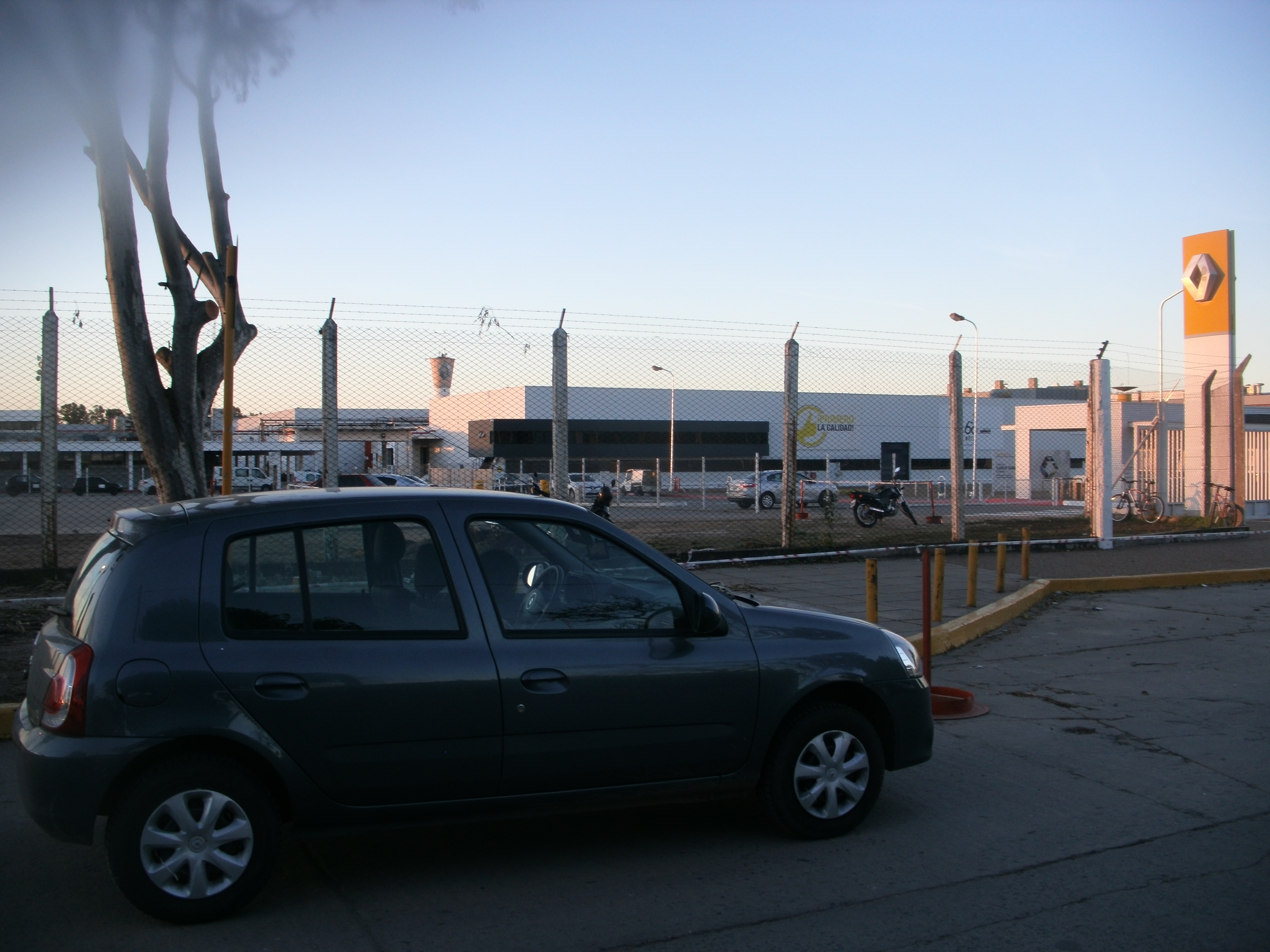
- A Clio model in front of the Renault Argentina factory in Santa Isabel, Córdoba
- Type: Subsidiary
- Industry: Automotive
- Predecessor: IKA
- Founded: 1975; 51 years ago
- Headquarters: Buenos Aires, Argentina
- Area served: Argentina
- Key people: Pablo Sibilia (CEO)
- Products: Automobiles, vans, pickup trucks
- Revenue: ▲ARS12.9 billion (2012)
- Total assets: ▲ARS4.9 billion (2012)
- Owner: Renault SAS (96.33%); RDIC (3.67%)
- Number of employees: 3,656 (2012)
- Parent: Renault
- Subsidiaries: Centro Automotores S.A. and Centro del Norte S.A. (car dealerships); Plan Rombo S.A. and Courtage S.A. (automotive financing)
- Website: renault.com.ar

Renault Argentina is the Argentine subsidiary of the French car manufacturer Renault. It is one of the oldest Renault operations in the world and is ranked consistently in first place by sales between the local automakers. Renault Argentina was officially established in 1975, but the French company had a long presence in Argentina before that.

== History ==
=== Early years ===
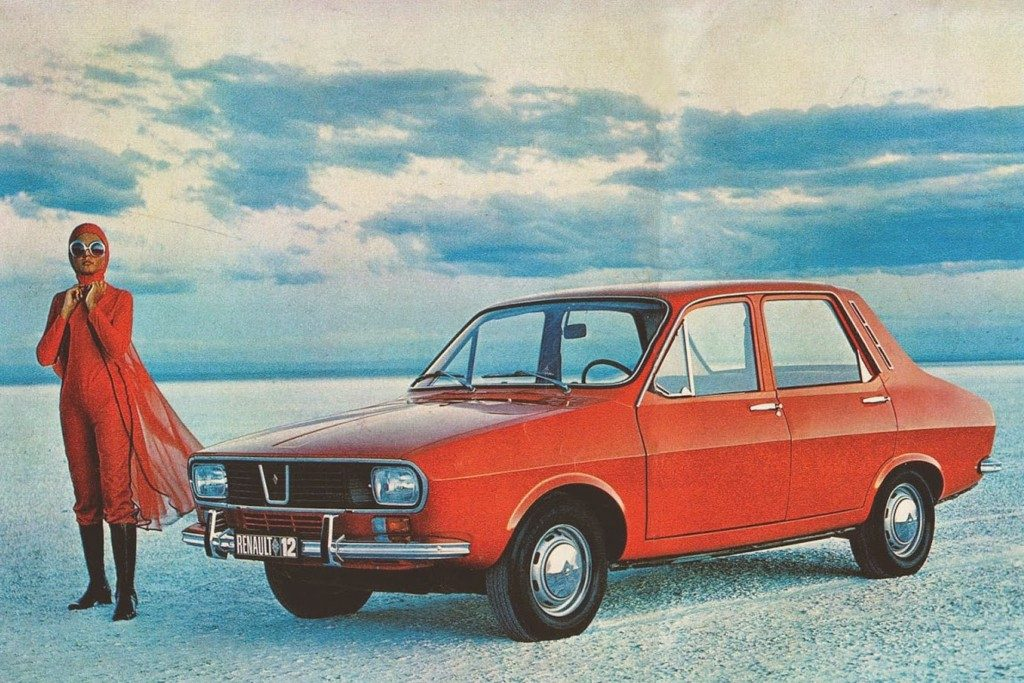
The Renault 12 (launched in 1971) was one of the most iconic cars produced by Renault Argentina

Renault partnered with Industrias Kaiser Argentina, a company created by Kaiser-Frazer Automobile Corporation and the Argentine government, which had a factory in Santa Isabel, Córdoba and a network of smaller factories around the country. In 1967, Renault took control of Industrias Kaiser Argentina by acquiring a majority stake, renaming it IKA Renault SAICF. In 1970, Renault purchased the remaining company's shares, introducing in 1971 the Renault 12, which would become one of its most popular cars in the Argentine market with more than 444,000 units produced. That car was manufactured in the country until 1994.

In 1975, the French automaker renamed its operations again, this time as "Renault Argentina S.A." The firm remained in the Santa Isabel factory that had belonged to IKA.

=== Market expansion and decline ===
During the next years, Renault launched a series of successful Argentine-built models such as the Renault 18 and the Renault 11, but at the end of the 1980s it was hit by the country's economic crisis. Renault Argentina was manufacturing 70 vehicles per day with an installed capacity up to 400 and it had an aged, overly large workforce. The French parent company decided to divest from its Argentine operations.

=== CIADEA ===
When Carlos Saúl Menem assumed the Argentine presidency, the markets were opened and Renault ceased many of its minor operations in Argentina, improving its economic situation. In 1992, the entrepreneur Manuel Antelo agreed the purchase of a majority stake in Renault Argentina. According to some journalists, the terms of this agreement were very advantageous for Antelo. He only had to pay if the company made profits and also received ARS100 million from Renault. Renault Argentina was renamed Compañia Interamericana de Automóviles SA (American Automobile Company) or CIADEA, S.A. The actual ownership of it was transferred to a holding called Compagnie Financière pour l'Amérique Latine (Financial Company for Latin America) or Cofal, from which Antelo owned two-thirds and the rest was from Renault of France. The holding also took control of the newly established Brazilian operations. Cofal in turn only held 72.3% of CIADEA. The remaining shares were listed on the Buenos Aires stock exchange.

Antelo reorganized the corporate structure, fired workers and installed facility improvements, bringing the level of quality to that of the Renault factories in France. The company introduced the Renault 19 and Renault 9 and became one of the leading automakers.

==== 1994 allegations ====
In 1994 the Argentine courts began proceedings against Antelo alleging smuggling and defrauding due to a complaint by the Dirección General de Aduanas (National Customs Administration), which accused him of making fraudulent imports and exports of vehicles. The move was related to the exportation of auto parts to Uruguay before returning it to Argentina as Renault Trafic units.

According to the charges, these operations allowed CIADEA to improperly collect exportation refunds and exemption taxes for imported vehicles. In April 1998, the Federal Court dismissed the accusations to Antelo. The Federal Court of Appeal reversed the judgment ordering again prosecutions. In August 2000, a court set a bail of ARS1 million to Antelo and exempted him from going to prison. In February 2006, the case was dismissed.

=== Return to Renault ===
In spite of the introduction of the Clio and the Mégane, CIADEA struggled to achieve profitability in the 1990s. In 1997, Antelo sold a majority stake of Cofal to Renault. CIADEA was called again Renault Argentina. The company had mixed results during the next years. From 2001 to 2010, Renault Argentina was in charge of Nissan sales in Argentina.

In 2005, Renault ordered to its stock operations company, Renault Développement Industriel et Commercial (RDIC), to launch a takeover bid for its shares, leaving the stock exchange in 2006.

In 2018, the Santa Isabel factory started to produce in Argentina the Frontier pickup, as part of the global Renault-Nissan alliance that began in March 1999. Production required an investment of US$600 million, and 50% of the production would be exported. Despite being produced at Renault factory, the pickup kept its original name and brand.

Two years later Renault Argentina started to manufacture its own pickup model, the Alaskan. This model shared platform and engine (and most components) with the Nissan Frontier. Both pickups have been produced in the Santa Isabel factory.

== Santa Isabel factory ==
The Santa Isabel factory is located 10 kilometers away from Córdoba province's capital, in a land area of 238.5 hectares, within which the building covers approximately 400,000 square meters. This industrial facility is divided into several workshops: Drawing and Welding Department, stamping, Assembly Department and Painting Department, supported by the Departments of Industrial Logistics, Engineering and Quality, all dependents on the factory's management. It also has Departments of Human Resources, Logistic, Financial Management, Business, among others.

In 2006, the 50th anniversary of its inauguration, Renault organised a commemorative parade where participated all the vehicles produced at the plant since 1956.

== Produced models ==
List of vehicles by the company (models previously produced by Industrias Kaiser Argentina only count since 1975 then "Renault Argentina" was established)

=== Current models ===
Name	Type	Origin	Produced	Image
Kangoo (Note: The second generation was based on the Dacia Dokker and produced since 2018.)	Van	ROM	1999–present	

=== Past models ===
Name	Type	Origin	Produced	Image
4 (Note: Previously manufactured by IKA under license of Renault.)	Economy / Van	FRA	1975–86	
Torino (Note: Previously manufactured by IKA, based on the 1965 AMC's Rambler American and redesigned by Pininfarina.)	Mid-size	USA; ARG	1969–81	
6	C-segment	FRA	1975–84	
12	Mid-size / Station wagon	FRA	1970–93	
18	D-segment / Station wagon	FRA	1981–93	
Fuego	Sport compact	FRA	1982–91	
11	C-segment	FRA	1984–93	
Trafic	Van	FRA	1986–2002	
9	C-segment	FRA	1987–96	
21	D-segment	FRA	1988–97	
19	C-segment	FRA	1992–99	
Mégane I	C-segment	FRA	1997–2008	
Clio	B-segment	FRA	1996–2016	
Symbol	Subcompact	FRA	2008–13	
Logan (Note: Rebranded Dacia model.)	Subcompact	ROM	2016–25	
Sandero	Subcompact	ROM	2016–25	
Stepway (Note: Originally a version of the Sandero model, the Stepway is marketed as a separate model from the Sandero in Latin America.)	Crossover	ROM	2019–25	
Alaskan (Note: The model is part of the Renault-Nissan alliance.)	Pickup truck	JPN	2020–25	
Fluence	Sedan	FRA	2010–18	

== Imported models ==
- Arkana E-Tech (2025–present)
- Boreal (2026–present)
- Duster (2011–present) (Note: Marketed in Europe under Renault subsidiary Dacia brand.)
- Duster Oroch (2016–present) (Note: Marketed in Europe under Renault subsidiary Dacia brand.)
- Kardian (2024–present)
- Koleos (2009–present)
- Kwid (2017-present)
- Master (2001–present)
- Megane E-Tech (2024–2026)
- Captur (2016–23)
- Express (1985–2001)
- Grand Scénic (2007–10)
- Laguna (1995–2001)
- Laguna II (2002–08)
- Latitude (2011–14)
- Mégane II (2005–11)
- Mégane III (2010–17)
- Kangoo Z.E (2018-22)
- Kangoo E-Tech (2022-26)
- Scénic (1998–2010)
- Twingo (1995–2003)
- 25 (1991–199?)

== Motorsport ==
Renault Argentina manages a sporting division called Renault Sport Argentina. The division participates in Super TC2000, TC2000, Turismo Nacional and organises the local Formula Renault championship. In TC2000, Renault achieved a great success with the Argentine-built Renault Fuego during the 1980s and 1990s. Renault Sport Argentina also formed the Renault Duster Team to participate at the 2013 Dakar Rally with two units.
