= Renault Niagara =

Compact pickup truck

Overview
- Manufacturer: Renault
- Production: 2026–present
- Assembly: Argentina: Santa Isabel, Córdoba (Renault Argentina)
- Designer: Under the lead of Laurens van den Acker

Body and chassis
- Class: Compact pickup truck
- Body style: 4-door pickup truck
- Layout: Front-engine, front-wheel-drive; Front-engine, all-wheel-drive
- Platform: RGMP (Renault Group Modular Platform)
- Chassis: Unibody
- Related: Renault Boreal; Dacia/Renault Duster; Dacia Bigster; Nissan Tekton

Powertrain
- Engine: Petrol flex fuel: 1.3 L TCe turbo I4
- Transmission: 6-speed manual; 6-speed wet dual-clutch

Dimensions
- Wheelbase: 2,960 mm (116.5 in)
- Length: 4,910–4,940 mm (193.3–194.5 in)
- Width: 1,830 mm (72.0 in)
- Height: 1,720 mm (67.7 in)

Chronology
- Predecessor: Renault Oroch

The Renault Niagara is a compact pickup truck produced by Renault since 2026. It was revealed on 10 September 2026, and is developed for Latin American markets as a successor to the Renault Oroch.

The Niagara is closely related to the Renault Boreal, sharing the same Renault Group Modular Platform (RGMP) platform, body panels, and much of its interior. It is the first Renault pickup sold in Brazil to offer all-wheel drive.

The Niagara is assembled at Renault's Santa Isabel plant in Córdoba, Argentina, and forms part of the company's strategy to launch 14 new models across markets outside Europe by 2030.

== History ==
The production Niagara is derived from the Niagara Concept, an E-Tech Hybrid 4x4 study revealed in October 2023 that previewed the pickup's dimensions and hybrid architecture.

In March 2024, Renault Argentina president Pablo Sibilla confirmed the production version would be built at the Santa Isabel plant on a dedicated assembly line, separate from the medium-sized Renault Alaskan and Nissan Frontier pickups also produced there. Renault also confirmed at the time that Nissan would develop its own variant of the pickup, mirroring the existing Alaskan/Frontier arrangement. By April 2025, the Nissan variant had been dropped from Nissan's public plans amid a broader restructuring, and the automaker ended its Argentine production that November.

Renault globally revealed the production Niagara on 10 September 2026, with sales in Brazil scheduled to begin that November. A hybrid version, sharing its 48-volt mild hybrid system with the Boreal, is planned to launch in Brazil in November 2027.

Niagara's principal target markets are Brazil, Argentina, and Colombia, with exports planned to additional Latin American countries at a later date. In Brazil, it succeeds the Oroch and competes with pickups including the Fiat Toro, Ram Rampage, and Ford Maverick.

== Design and equipment ==
The Niagara shares its front-end design with the Boreal up to the B-pillar, including its full-LED headlamps, bonnet, and bumper, though the range-topping Outsider 4x4 version receives a more pronounced lower bumper section. The grille features the Renault name spelled out in pixelated chrome lettering, flanked by full-LED headlamps with gloss black surrounds and a distinct daytime running light signature.

Past the B-pillar, the design is distinct from the Boreal. In the tailgate, the Niagara name stamped directly into the metal and a black strip connecting its LED tail lights, with the tailgate release button concealed within the Renault logo. Roof bars are standard, with restyled roll bars available for securing bulky cargo, and wheels range from 17 to 18 inches depending on trim.

Much of the Niagara's interior is shared with the Boreal, including a 10.2-inch digital instrument cluster and a 10.1-inch OpenR Link infotainment touchscreen with Google built in, including the Google Gemini voice assistant. A Multi-Sense drive-mode system and customisable ambient lighting are also fitted. Compared with the Boreal, the Niagara's rear seat backrest is reclined by around 25 degrees, and the cabin adds dedicated rear air-conditioning vents, USB-C ports, and a 36 L (1.3 cu ft) storage space behind the rear seats; the Boreal's Harman Kardon sound system and sunroof are not offered.

Driver-assistance features include adaptive cruise control with stop-and-go, forward collision warning with automatic emergency braking, lane departure warning, blind-spot warning, traffic sign recognition, a 360-degree camera, automatic parking, and reverse automatic emergency braking.

== Platform and chassis ==
The Niagara is built on the Renault Group Modular Platform (RGMP), designed to accommodate vehicles between 4 and 5 m (13 and 16 ft) long with a wheelbase of 2.6 to 3 m (8.5 to 9.8 ft). The production Niagara measures 4.94 m (16.2 ft) long (4.91 m (16.1 ft) on the front-wheel-drive version), with a wheelbase of 2.96 m (9.7 ft); the Outsider 4x4 variant is 1.83 m (6.0 ft) wide and 1.72 m (5.6 ft) tall, with 233 mm (9.2 in) of ground clearance. The load bed has a volume of 938 L (33.1 cu ft) and a stated payload of up to 654 kg (1,442 lb), while towing capacity is rated at 710 kg (1,565 lb).

Unlike the Oroch, the Niagara replaces a torsion beam rear suspension with a multi-link setup, which Renault says allows the four-wheel-drive system to be fitted even on the front-wheel-drive versions' architecture. The suspension tuning is exclusive to the Niagara.

== Powertrain ==
The Niagara is powered by a 1.3-litre turbocharged TCe petrol engine running on flex-fuel, producing 156 PS (154 hp; 115 kW) on petrol or 160 PS (158 hp; 118 kW) on ethanol, with 270 N⋅m (199 lb⋅ft) of torque on either fuel. A six-speed manual gearbox with front-wheel drive is offered on entry-level versions, with two further front-wheel-drive variants using a six-speed wet dual-clutch transmission; the range-topping Outsider adds four-wheel drive, biased toward the front axle and engaging the rear through a driveshaft and clutch pack, with a driver-selectable 50:50 locked mode.

A hybrid version is under development and expected to launch in Brazil in November 2027. The system is expected to combine the 1.3 TCe engine with 48-volt mild-hybrid assistance at the front axle and a separate rear-mounted electric motor producing 31 PS (31 hp; 23 kW) and 87 N⋅m (64 lb⋅ft), fed by a 0.84 kWh battery.

== See also ==
- List of Renault vehicles
