= Guardia Urbana de Buenos Aires =

Defunct urban civilian force in Argentina

- Active: 2004
- Disbanded: By March 2008
- Country: Argentina
- Role: Urban crime
- Equipment: Radio, whistle

Commanders
- General Director: Comodoro General Leandro Iván Chulack
- Adjunct General Director: Comodoro Mauro Sestua

The Guardia Urbana de Buenos Aires (Buenos Aires Urban Guard) was a specialized civilian force of the city of Buenos Aires, Argentina. It dealt with urban conflicts with the objective of prevention, dissuasion, and mediation, promoting behaviors that guarantee the security and the integrity of public order and social coexistence. The unit assisted the Argentine Federal Police, especially in emergency situations and the protection of tourist establishments.

The group helped enforce seat belt use, blood alcohol content tests, and traffic order. Its agents are enabled to offer quick and objective information to tourists and foreign people. Other functions include taking part in cases of intentional damage or negligence.

The Urban Guard were not armed. Their basic tools were a radio and a whistle.

As of March 2008, the Guardia Urbana was disbanded. Its people were transferred into a new law enforcement organization addressing traffic order called the Seguridad Vial.

== Ranks ==
Ranks of the Urban Guard were novel and had a maritime theme, reflecting Buenos Aires' status as a major port.

The ranks were:

- Brigadier Comisionado en Jefe, "Commissioned Brigadier-in-Chief" (only used on one occasion)
- Comodoro General, "Commodore General"
- Comodoro, "Commodore"
- Vice-comodoro, "Vice-Commodore"
- Edecán Mayor, "Aide-de-camp Major"
- Edecán, "Aide-de-camp"
- Inspector Porteño, "Porteño Inspector"
- Grumete Furriel, "Quartermaster Shipmate"
- Grumete-Tropa, "Troop Shpimate"
- Aprendiz de los Buenos Aires, "Buenos Aires Apprentice"

== See also ==
- Argentine Federal Police
- Buenos Aires Police
- Santa Fe Province Police
- Interior Security System
