= Buenos Aires City Police =

Police force of Buenos Aires

Buenos Aires City Police Policía de la Ciudad de Buenos Aires
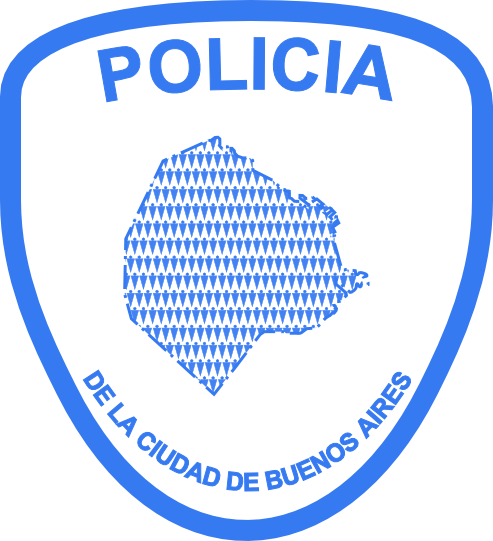

Agency overview
- Formed: January 1, 2017; 9 years ago
- Preceding agency: Buenos Aires Metropolitan Police Argentine Federal Police (City of Buenos Aires Division)
- Employees: 25,000

Jurisdictional structure
- Operations jurisdiction: Buenos Aires
- General nature: Local civilian police

Operational structure
- Elected officer responsible: Eugenio Burzaco, Minister of Security and Justice
- Agency executive: Gabriel Berard, Chief of Police
- Divisions: Security, Investigation, Scientific, Technical

Facilities
- Stations: 56

Website
- policiadelaciudad.gob.ar

The Buenos Aires City Police (Spanish: Policía de la Ciudad de Buenos Aires) is the municipal police force of Buenos Aires.

== History ==
It began operation in 2017 following the merger of the Buenos Aires Metropolitan Police and the city's division of the Argentine Federal Police. The force is composed of over 25,000 officers. It operates under the authority of the Autonomous City.

== Structure ==
The Buenos Aires City Police is led by a Chief of Police who is appointed by the head of the executive branch of the City Government. The chief must be a civilian.

The four major operational areas are:

- Public Security
- Investigations and Research
- Scientific and Technical
- Administration

The force is made up of eleven superintendencies and seven autonomous departments.

The force supports 56 stations. Station employees are all civilians.

== Ranks ==
The Buenos Aires City Police has 13 ranks, led by the Chief Superintendent. The ranking system was inherited from the Metropolitan Police. The Chief Superintendent rank is an addition, used only by the head of the BACP.

- Officer
- First Officer
- Senior Officer
- Principal Officer
- Inspector
- Chief Inspector
- Deputy Commissioner
- Commissioner
- Senior Commissioner
- Deputy Commissioner General
- Commissioner-General
- Superintendent
- Chief Superintendent of the City Police

== Equipment ==
=== Arms ===
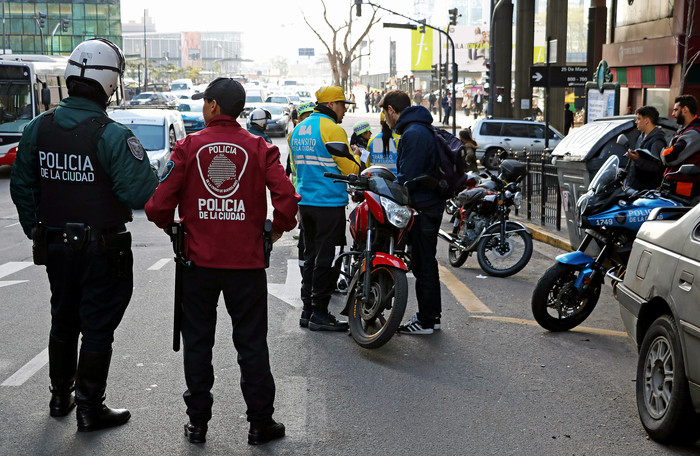
Buenos Aires City Police checkpoint

The force employs a variety of weapons.

Weapon	Origin	Type	User
Beretta PX4 Storm	Italy	Semi-automatic pistol	Standard issue
Bersa Thunder 9	Argentina	Semi-automatic pistol	Standard issue
SIG Sauer 1911	United States	Semi-automatic pistol	DOEM tactical group
Benelli M3	Italy	Shotgun	Standard issue
SIG Sauer MPX	United States	Submachine gun	DOEM tactical group
SIG Sauer SIG516	United States	Carbine	DOEM tactical group
SIG Sauer SIG716 DMR	United States	Sniper rifle	DOEM tactical group
FN 303	Belgium	Riot control	Standard issue

=== Vehicles ===
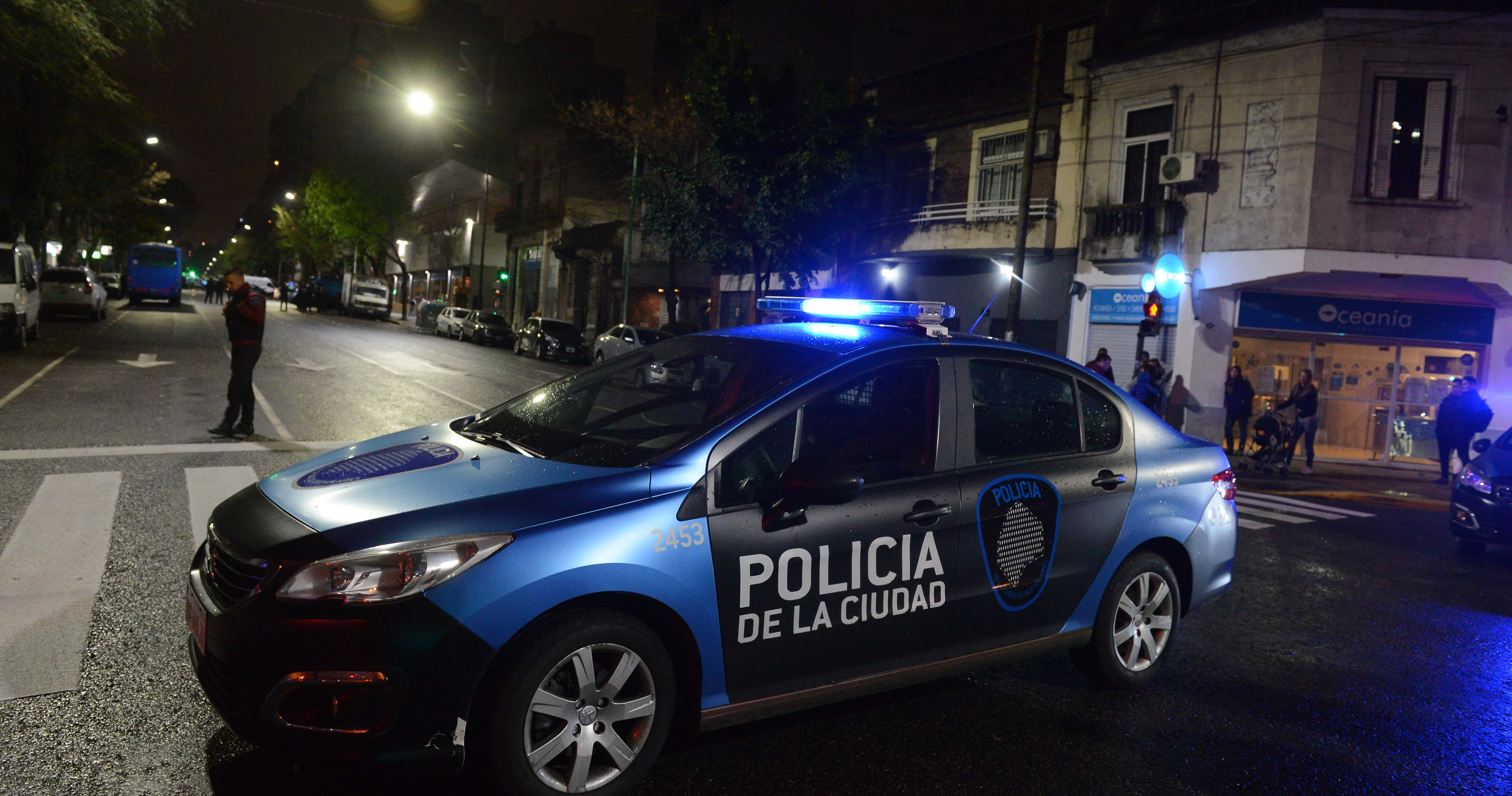
Peugeot 408 police car

- Ford Focus EXE
- Peugeot 408
- Citroën C4 Lounge
- Chevrolet Meriva
- Ford Ranger
- Toyota Hilux
- Piaggio MP3
- Honda Deauville NT700

== See also ==
- Buenos Aires Metropolitan Police
- Argentine Federal Police
- Buenos Aires Province Police
- Interior Security System
- Municipal police
