= Buenos Aires Provincial Police =

Buenos Aires Provincial Police Policía de la Provincia de Buenos Aires
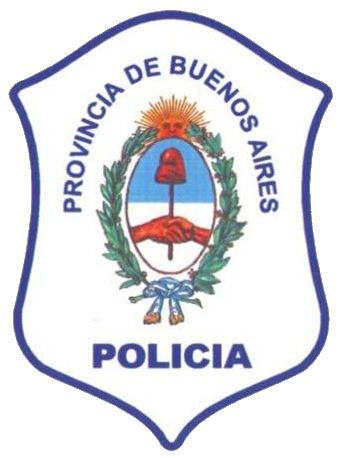

Agency overview
- Formed: December 24, 1821; 204 years ago
- Employees: +90,000

Jurisdictional structure
- General nature: Local civilian police

Operational structure
- Elected officer responsible: Javier Alonso, Ministry of Security of PBA
- Agency executive: Javier Villar, Chief of Police

Website
- policia.mseg.gba.gov.ar

The Buenos Aires Provincial Police (Spanish: Policía de la Provincia de Buenos Aires, informally Policía Bonaerense) is the police service responsible for policing the Buenos Aires Province of Argentina.

== Organisation ==
It is one of the biggest police services of Argentina, responsible for policing a province of over 15 million inhabitants, about 38% of Argentina's entire population.

The Federal Capital district of Buenos Aires city is under the separate jurisdiction of the Buenos Aires City Police.

The institution is usually referred to as Policía Bonaerense, where bonaerense is the demonym for the Province of Buenos Aires. This contrasts with porteño, used for the inhabitants of the Buenos Aires city.

This police force is subordinate to the Provincial Ministry of Security headed by Javier Alonso.

== Ranks ==
=== Former ===
Until January 2005, the Buenos Aires Police used the same rank system as employed by the Federal Police and other Argentine provincial police forces.

This system consisted of seventeen ranks, of which nine were for (commissioned) officers and eight were for sub-officers (including the basic rank of agent).

A new and simplified rank system was established through passage of a law governing police personnel.

This system officially abolished the distinction between (commissioned) officers and sub-officers. It instituted a rank system consisting of the following nine ranks, listed in descending order:

Rank	English translation
Superintendente	Superintendent
Comisionado	Commissioner
Inspector	Inspector
Capitán	Captain
Teniente Primero	First Lieutenant
Teniente	Lieutenant
Subteniente	Sublieutenant
Sargento	Sergeant
Oficial de Policía	Police Officer

=== Current ===
As of 2009, a new law modified the police ranks and established some variations (Ley 13.982/09).

It establishes different personnel rankings ("Escalafones" as they are called in Spanish), which relate to operational responsibilities:

- Officers of the General ranking;
- Officers of the Command ranking;
- Professional Officers;
- Administrative Officers;
- Technical Officers;
- General Services personnel;
- 911 personnel;
- Civilian personnel.

Current rank system
Command
Rank	Insignias
Comisario General	
Comisario Mayor	
Comisario Inspector	
Comisario	
Subcomisario	
Oficial Principal	
Oficial Inspector	
Oficial Subinspector	
Oficial Ayudante	
Oficial Subayudante	
General
Mayor	
Capitán	
Teniente 1º	
Teniente	
Subteniente	
Sargento	
Oficial	

The current levels for the Command sub-ranking are (ten levels) in descending order:

- 1) Conducting Officers:

Comisario General
Comisario Mayor

- 2) Supervision Officers:

Comisario Inspector

- 3) Chief Officers:

Comisario
Subcomisario

- 4) Subordinate Officers:

Oficial Principal
Oficial Inspector
Oficial Subinspector
Oficial Ayudante
Oficial Subayudante
The General sub-ranking defines seven levels (the general sub-ranking is subordinate to the commando sub-ranking, so its highest ranking is subordinate to the lowest ranking of commando officers):

- 1) Superior Officers:

Mayor (Major)
Capitán (Captain)
Teniente 1ro. (First Lieutenant)

- 2) Subordinate Officers:

Teniente (Lieutenant)
Subteniente (Sublieutenant)
Sargento (Sergeant)
Oficial (Officer)

- 3) Police Academy cadet.

Both the Commando and General rankings represent the sworn officers (armed personnel). The other rankings constitute the support staff. For the Professional, Technical and Administrative sub-rankings, the levels of the Commando sub-ranking is employed. The subordinate relationship between the subrankings makes the Commando ranking the highest group over all.

== Equipment ==
=== Arms ===
Weapon	Origin	Type
Bersa Thunder 9	Argentina	Semi-automatic pistol
Taurus PT92	Brazil	Semi-automatic pistol
Glock	Austria	Semi-automatic pistol
FMK-3	Argentina	Submachine gun
Uzi	Israel	Submachine gun
Hatsan Escort AimGuard	Turkey	Shotgun
Mossberg Maverick 88	United States	Shotgun
Ithaca 37	United States	Shotgun
FN FAL	Argentina	Assault rifle
Bersa BAR-15	United States	Assault rifle
Remington 700	United States	Sniper rifle

=== Vehicles ===
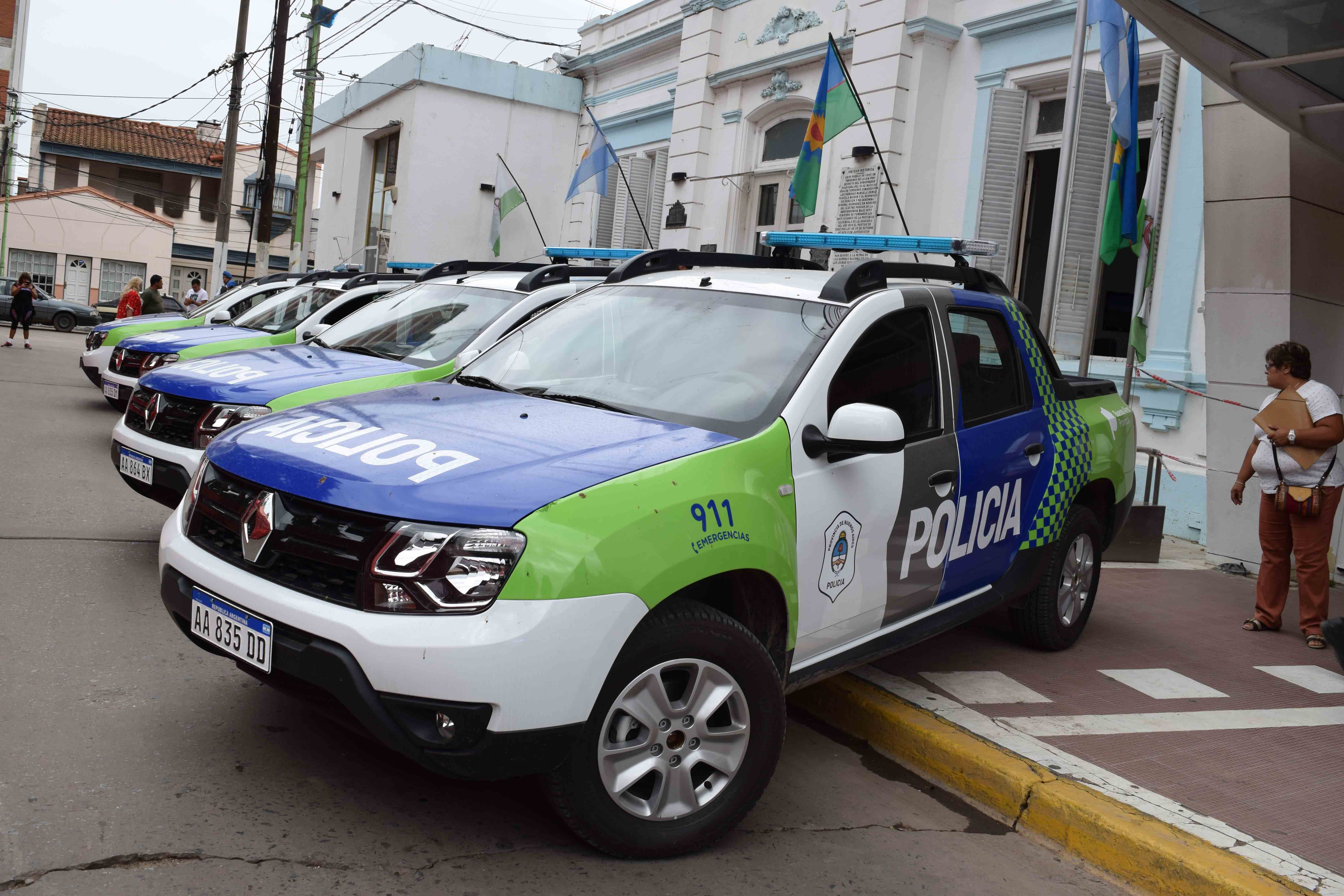
Renault Duster Oroch in service

- Toyota Hilux
- Fiat Cronos
- Renault Duster Oroch
- Chevrolet Astra
- Ford Ranger
- Ford Focus
- Toyota Etios
- Volkswagen Voyage
- Fiat Siena
- Iveco Daily
- Ram 1500

=== Helicópters ===
- MBB Bo 105
- Eurocopter AS350 Ecureuil

== See also ==
- Argentine Federal Police
- Buenos Aires Police Intelligence
- Buenos Aires Urban Guard
- Santa Fe Province Police
- Interior Security System
