= Renault Kardian =

Subcompact crossover SUV

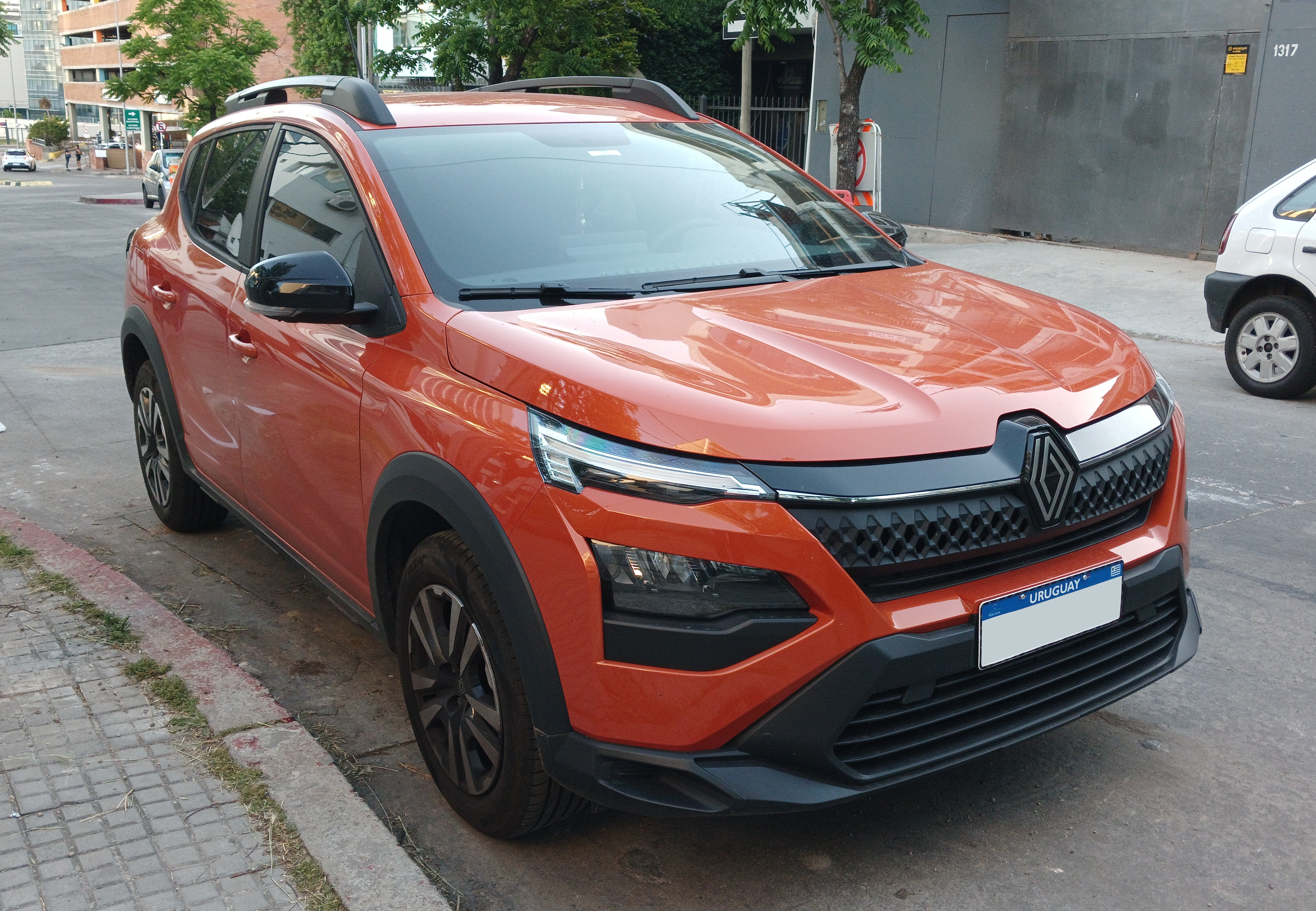
- 2024 Renault Kardian Evolution

Overview
- Manufacturer: Renault
- Production: November 2023 – present
- Assembly: Brazil: São José dos Pinhais (Renault do Brasil); Morocco: Casablanca (Somaca)
- Designer: Thomas Félix; Luiz Antonelli; Yuri Hayek; Gabriel Sfiazof

Body and chassis
- Class: Subcompact crossover SUV (B)
- Body style: 5-door hatchback
- Layout: Front-engine, front-wheel-drive
- Platform: RMP
- Related: Dacia Sandero III; Renault Taliant

Powertrain
- Engine: Petrol: 1.6 L K7M I4; Petrol flex-fuel: 1.0 L I3 turbo; Diesel: 1.5 L K9K dCi I4 (Morocco production)
- Transmission: 5-speed manual; 6-speed DCT; CVT (Morocco production)

Dimensions
- Wheelbase: 2,604 mm (102.5 in)
- Length: 4,119 mm (162.2 in)
- Width: 1,770 mm (69.7 in)
- Height: 1,540 mm (60.6 in)

Chronology
- Predecessor: Renault Stepway (Latin America, Ukraine)

The Renault Kardian is a subcompact crossover SUV (B-segment) produced by Renault since 2023. The vehicle is based on the third-generation Dacia Sandero, and mainly sold in Latin America, South Africa, Morocco and Ukraine (East Europe).

== Overview ==
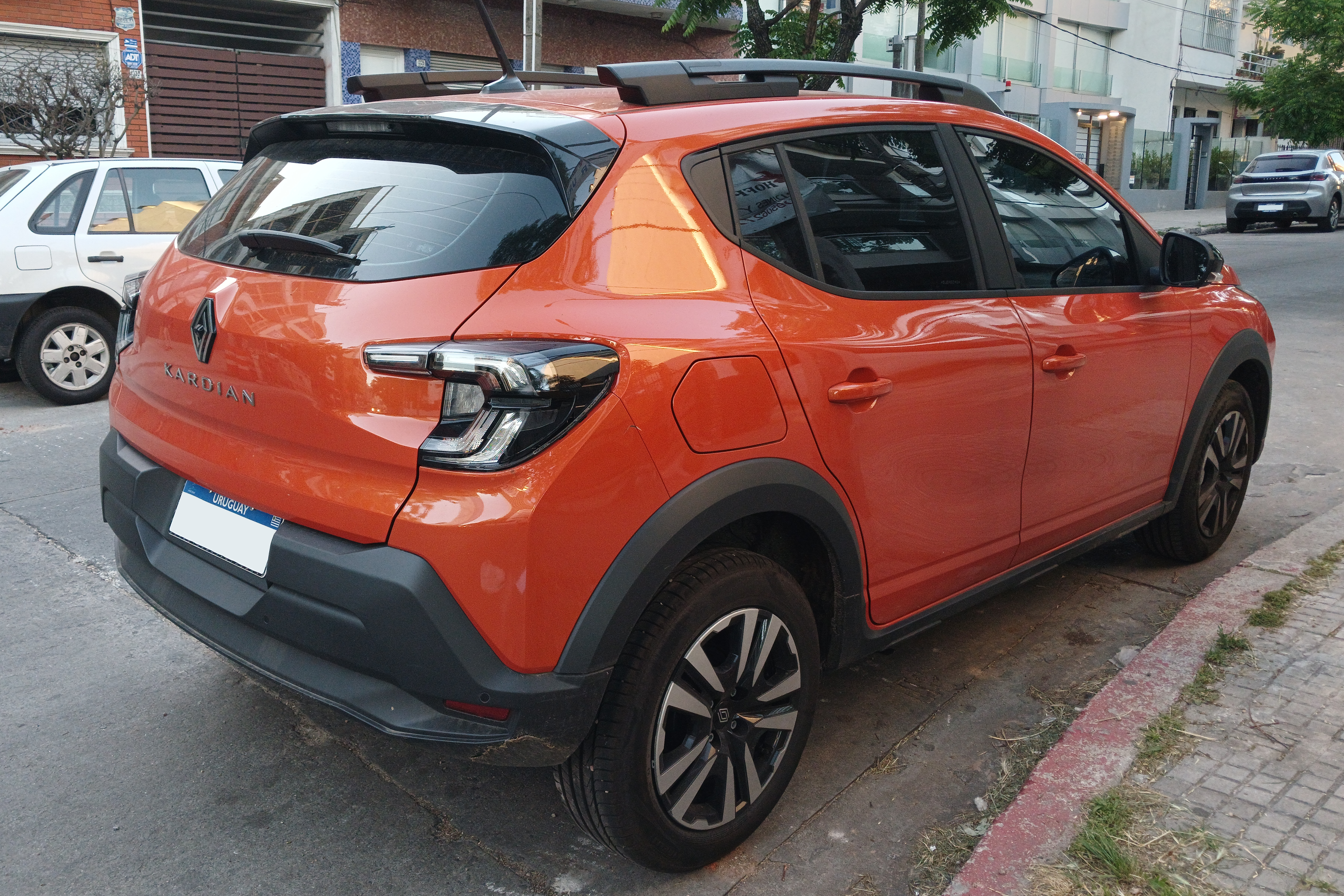
Rear view

The Kardian is built on a new iteration of the CMF architecture, called RMP (Renault Modular Platform). It shares some parts with the third generation Dacia Sandero, and the dashboard with the Renault Taliant. It is manufactured since November 2023 in Curitiba, Brazil for the South American market, and from late 2024 in Casablanca, Morocco for North African, Middle Eastern and Eastern Europe markets (Ukraine, Moldova).

=== Design ===
During the presentation of the model, Gilles Vidal, the design director, emphasized that the Kardian was the result of joint work between the Renault styling teams in France and Brazil.

== Powertrain ==
A new 125 hp (93 kW) flexfuel engine debuts, an evolution of the 1.0 TCe found on the Sandero. For the first time, this engine can be equipped with an all-new dual-clutch automatic transmission (codename DW23), which is due to be available in Europe with the launch of the third-generation Duster, scheduled for spring 2024.

In some countries such as Mexico, the Kardian is powered by a 1.6-litre engine producing 114 PS (112 hp; 84 kW).

== Safety ==
=== Latin NCAP ===
Latin NCAP 3.5 test results Renault Kardian + 6 Airbags (2024, similar to Euro NCAP 2017)
Test	Points	%
Overall:	4 /5 stars	
Adult occupant:	33.36	83%
Child occupant:	40.63	83%
Pedestrian:	23.02	48%
Safety assist:	36.03	84%

Latin NCAP 3.5 test results Renault Kardian + 6 Airbags (2025, similar to Euro NCAP 2017)
Test	Points	%
Overall:	5 /5 stars	
Adult occupant:	33.36	83%
Child occupant:	40.63	83%
Pedestrian:	35.02	73%
Safety assist:	36.03	84%

== Production and sales figures ==
=== Sales ===
Year	Brazil	Argentina	Colombia	Mexico	Morocco	Egypt	Ukraine
2024	24,402	3,145	1,993	1,312	452	/	/
2025	19,350	11,343	5,046	2,125	9,220	980	200

=== Total production ===
Year	Brazil	Morocco
2023	117	/
2024	44,019	1,067
2025	38,913	13,053
