= Dacia Bigster =

Compact crossover SUV

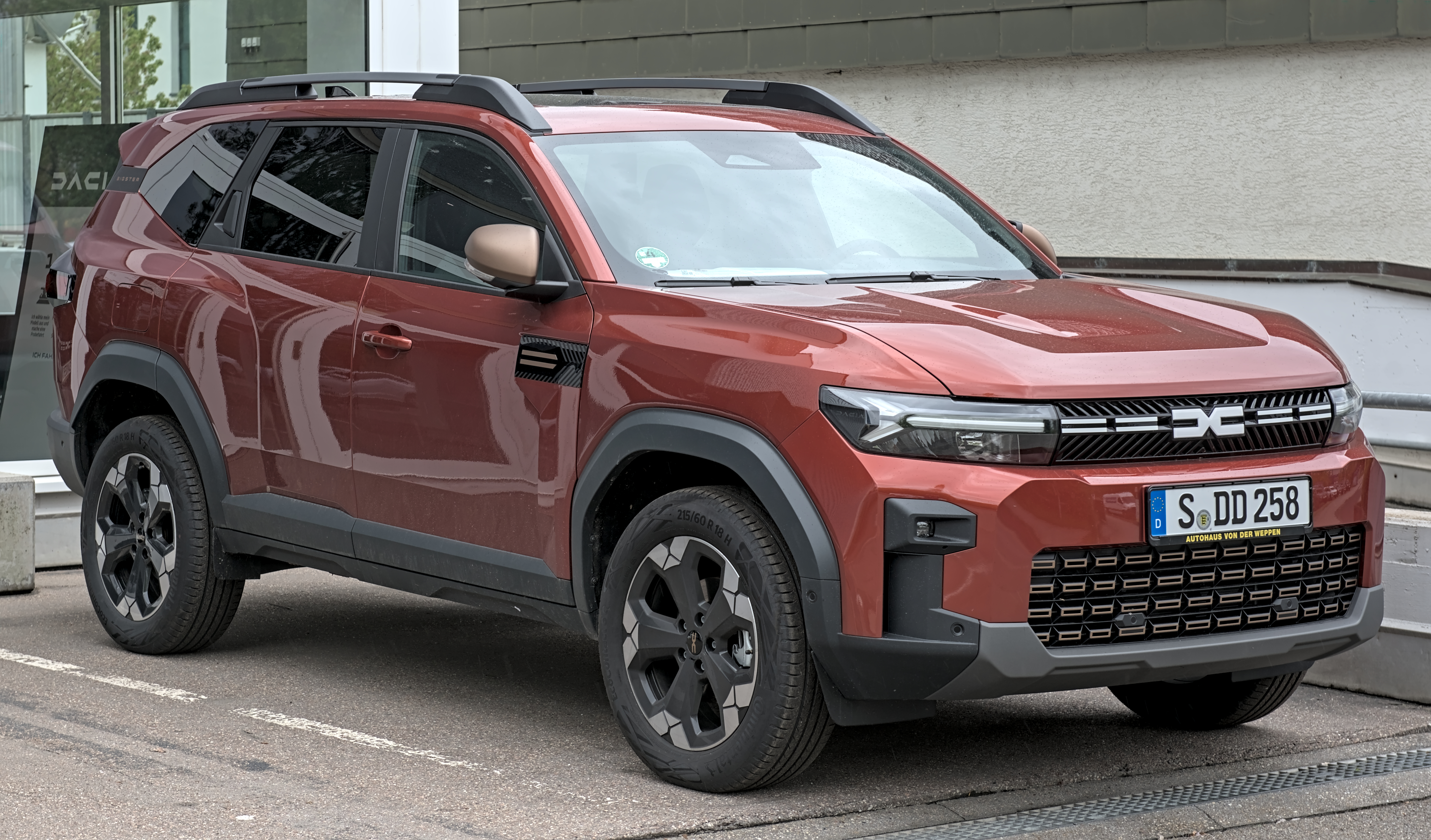
- 2025 Dacia Bigster

Overview
- Manufacturer: Dacia (Renault)
- Model code: R1310
- Production: December 2024 – present
- Assembly: Romania: Mioveni

Body and chassis
- Class: Compact crossover SUV (C)
- Body style: 5-door SUV
- Layout: Front-engine, front-wheel-drive / all-wheel drive
- Platform: Renault–Nissan CMF-B LS
- Related: Renault Boreal; Dacia Duster III; Renault Niagara; Dacia Logan III; Dacia Sandero III; Dacia Jogger; Dacia Striker

Powertrain
- Engine: Petrol / LPG: 1.2 L ECO-G I3 turbo Petrol hybrid: 1.2 L TCe I3 turbo (mild hybrid); 1.8 L Horse HR18 HEV I4 (Hybrid 155; 2026–present)
- Transmission: 6-speed manual 6-speed DCT

Dimensions
- Wheelbase: 2,702 mm (106.4 in)
- Length: 4,570 mm (179.9 in)
- Width: 1,812 mm (71.3 in)
- Height: 1,711 mm (67.4 in)
- Curb weight: 1,364–1,440 kg (3,007–3,175 lb)

The Dacia Bigster is a compact crossover SUV developed by a joint venture between the French automaker Renault and its Romanian subsidiary Dacia, produced in 2024 for a market launch in 2025. It is based on the third-generation Dacia Duster with an extended body length and wheelbase.

The Bigster was presented at the 90th edition of the 2024 Paris Motor Show in October.

== Design ==
The Bigster is based on the Renault Group CMF-B platform. The model is available with a full hybrid petrol engine and a liquefied petroleum gas (LPG) engine in the European market, and with a diesel option on other markets.

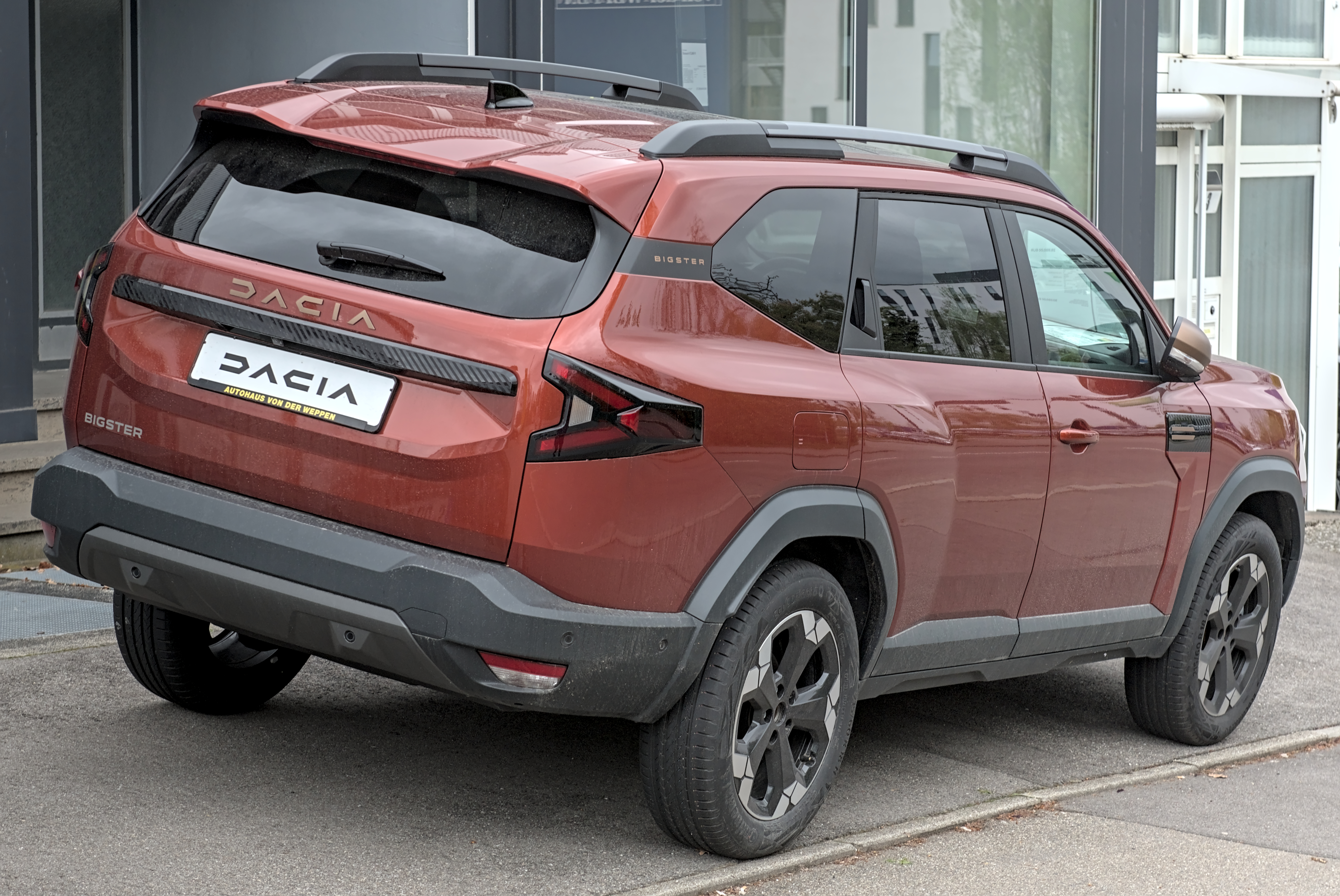
Rear view

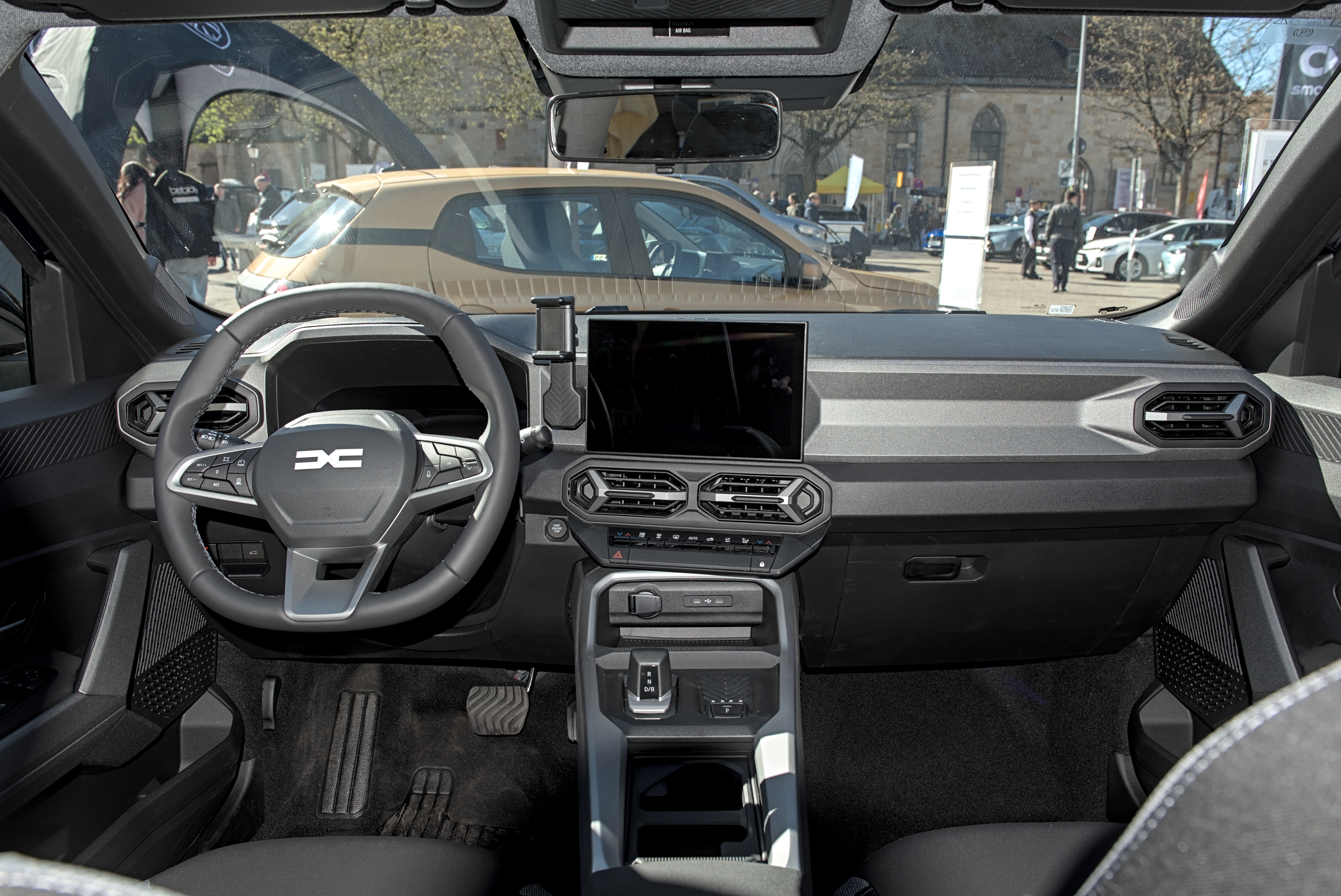
Interior

== Concept car ==
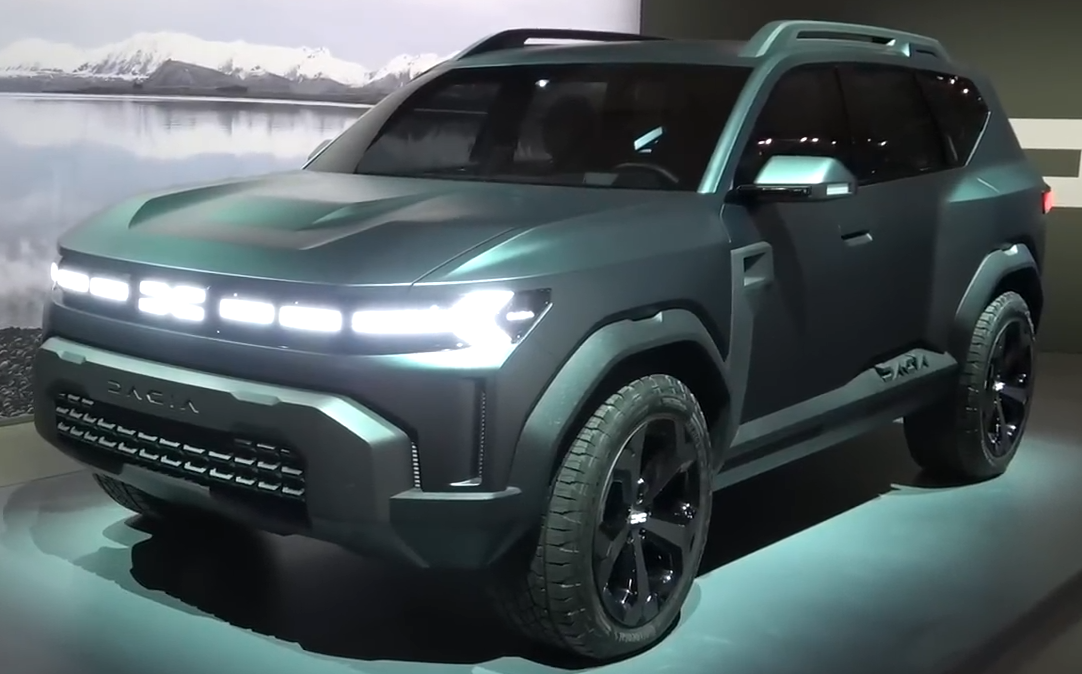
Front view

The Dacia Bigster was previewed by the Dacia Bigster concept presented on 14 January 2021 by Luca de Meo.

== Safety ==
Euro NCAP test results Dacia Bigster 1.8 HEV (LHD) (2024)
Test	Points	%
Overall:	3 /5 stars	
Adult occupant:	27.7	69%
Child occupant:	42	85%
Pedestrian:	38.2	60%
Safety assist:	10.3	57%

== Awards ==
Dacia Bigster has won many notable industry awards including German Car of the Year (category up to 25000 euro), Lithuanian Car of the Year (category up to 35000 euro), Irish SUV of the Year (Medium size category) and others. It also received many awards from motoring publications, e.g. Cinch's Car of the Year, or Family Car of the Year by News UK.
