= Interior Security System =

The Argentine Interior Security System (Spanish: Sistema de Seguridad Interior or SSI) is the official name of the public security service of Argentina.

The Interior Security System consists of the following individuals, agencies and dependencies:

- President of Argentina
- Governors and police agencies of the Argentine provinces
- Argentine National Congress
- Ministries of Interior, Security, Defence, and Justice
- Policía Federal Argentina (Argentine Federal Police; PFA)
- Gendarmería Nacional Argentina (Argentine National Gendarmerie; GNA)
- Prefectura Naval Argentina (Argentine Naval Prefecture; PNA)

The Interior Security System came online with the 1991.

== See also ==
- Argentine Federal Police
- Argentine National Gendarmerie
- Argentine Naval Prefecture
- Buenos Aires Police
- Santa Fe Province Police
