= Renault Boreal =

Compact crossover SUV

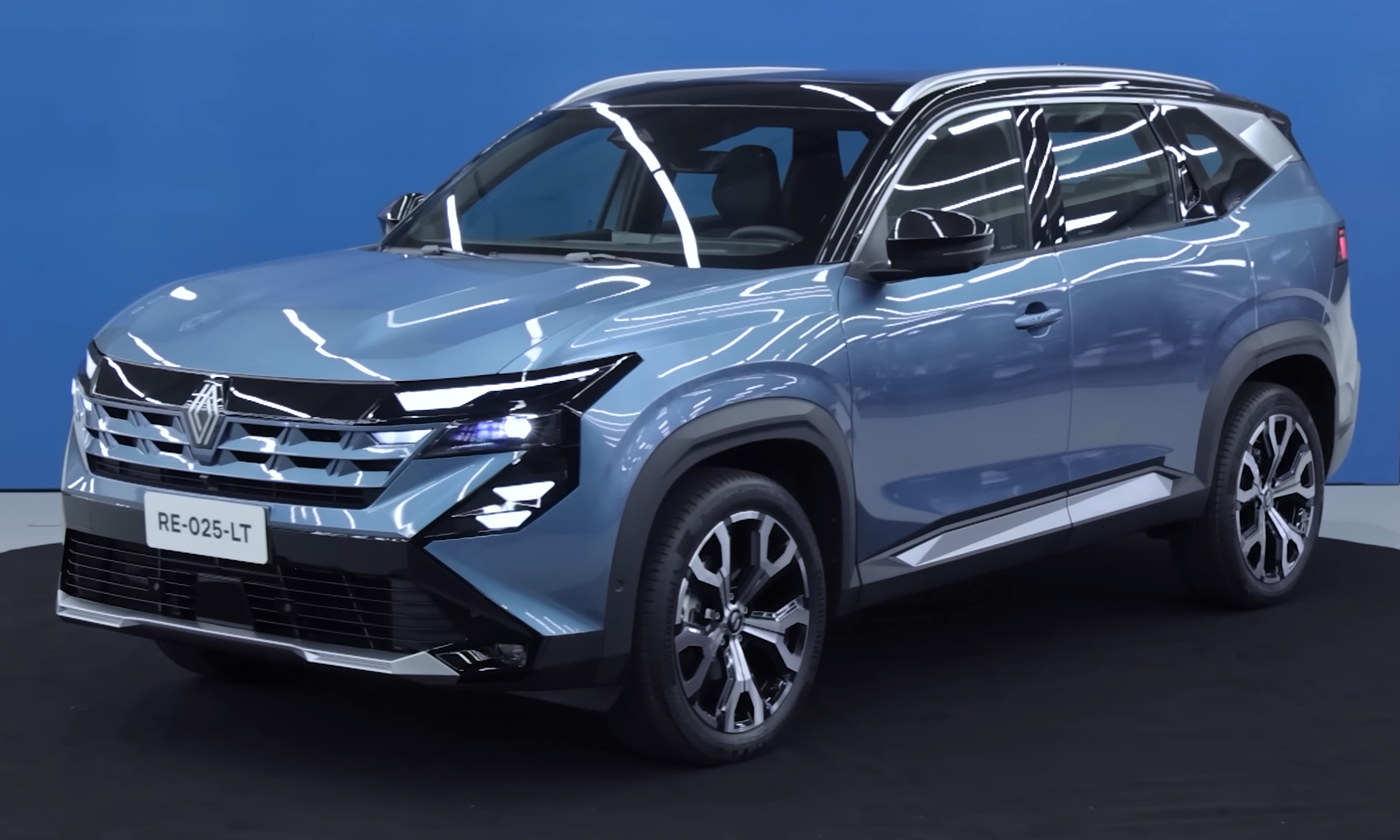

Overview
- Manufacturer: Renault
- Production: October 2025 – present
- Assembly: Brazil: Curitiba (Renault Geely Brazil); Turkey: Bursa (Oyak-Renault); India: Chennai (Renault Nissan India)

Body and chassis
- Class: Compact SUV (C-segment)
- Body style: 5-door crossover SUV
- Layout: Front-engine, front-wheel-drive / all-wheel drive
- Platform: RGMP (Renault Group Modular Platform)
- Related: Dacia Bigster; Renault Niagara

Powertrain
- Engine: Petrol: 1.3 L TCe H5Ht I4 turbo
- Power output: 138–163 hp (103–122 kW; 140–165 PS)
- Transmission: 6-speed DCT

Dimensions
- Wheelbase: 2,700 mm (106.3 in)
- Length: 4,550 mm (179.1 in)
- Width: 1,840 mm (72.4 in)
- Height: 1,650 mm (65.0 in)

Chronology
- Predecessor: Renault Mégane (Turkey)

The Renault Boreal is a compact crossover SUV by French car manufacturer Renault that is being produced since 2025. It is derived from the Dacia Bigster.

== Overview ==
From 2025, the Boreal is produced in Bursa, Turkey, for 54 markets, such as Eastern European countries (outside the European Union), the Middle East and countries around the Mediterranean.

It will also be manufactured in Chennai, India and in Curitiba plant in Brazil for Latin America.

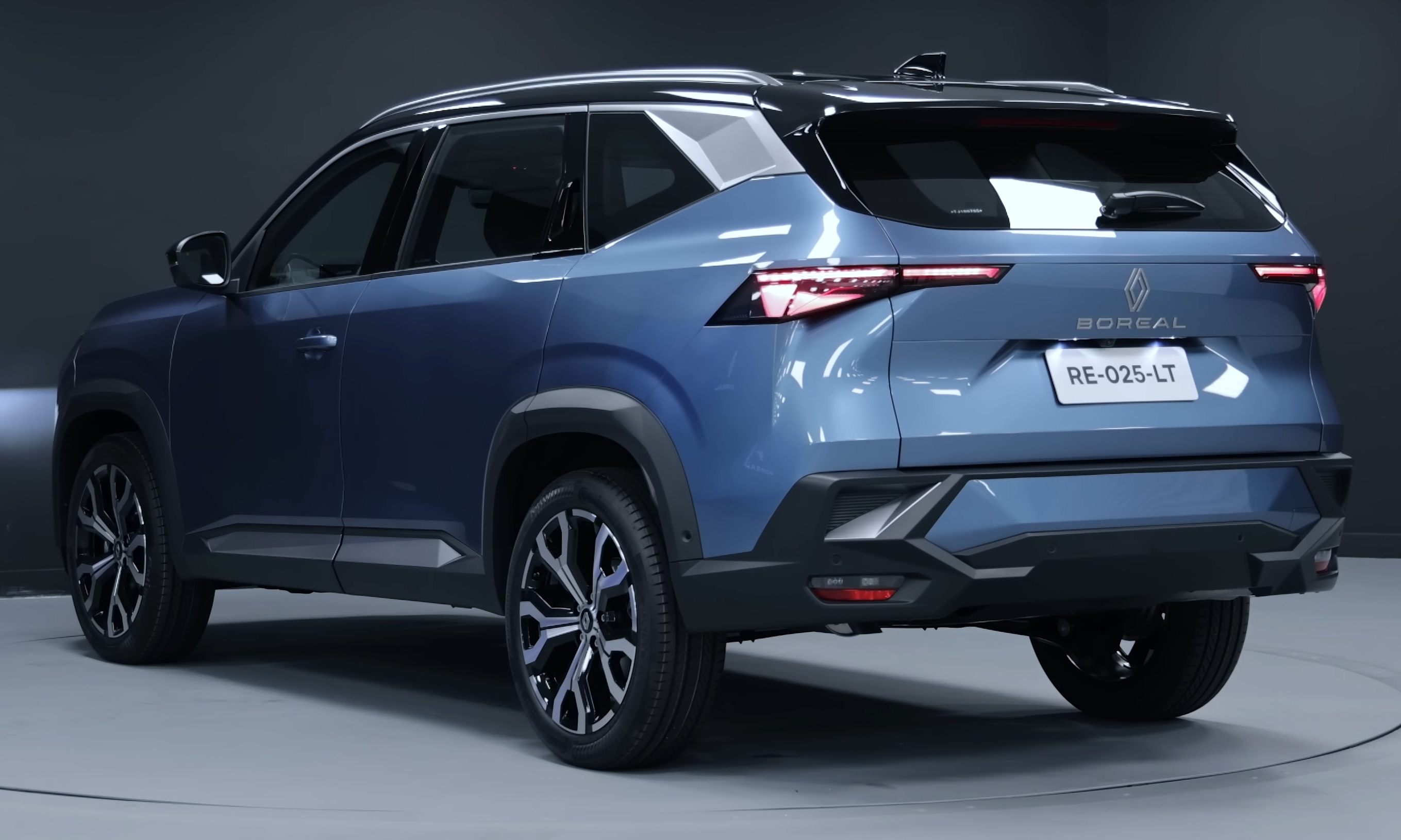
Rear view

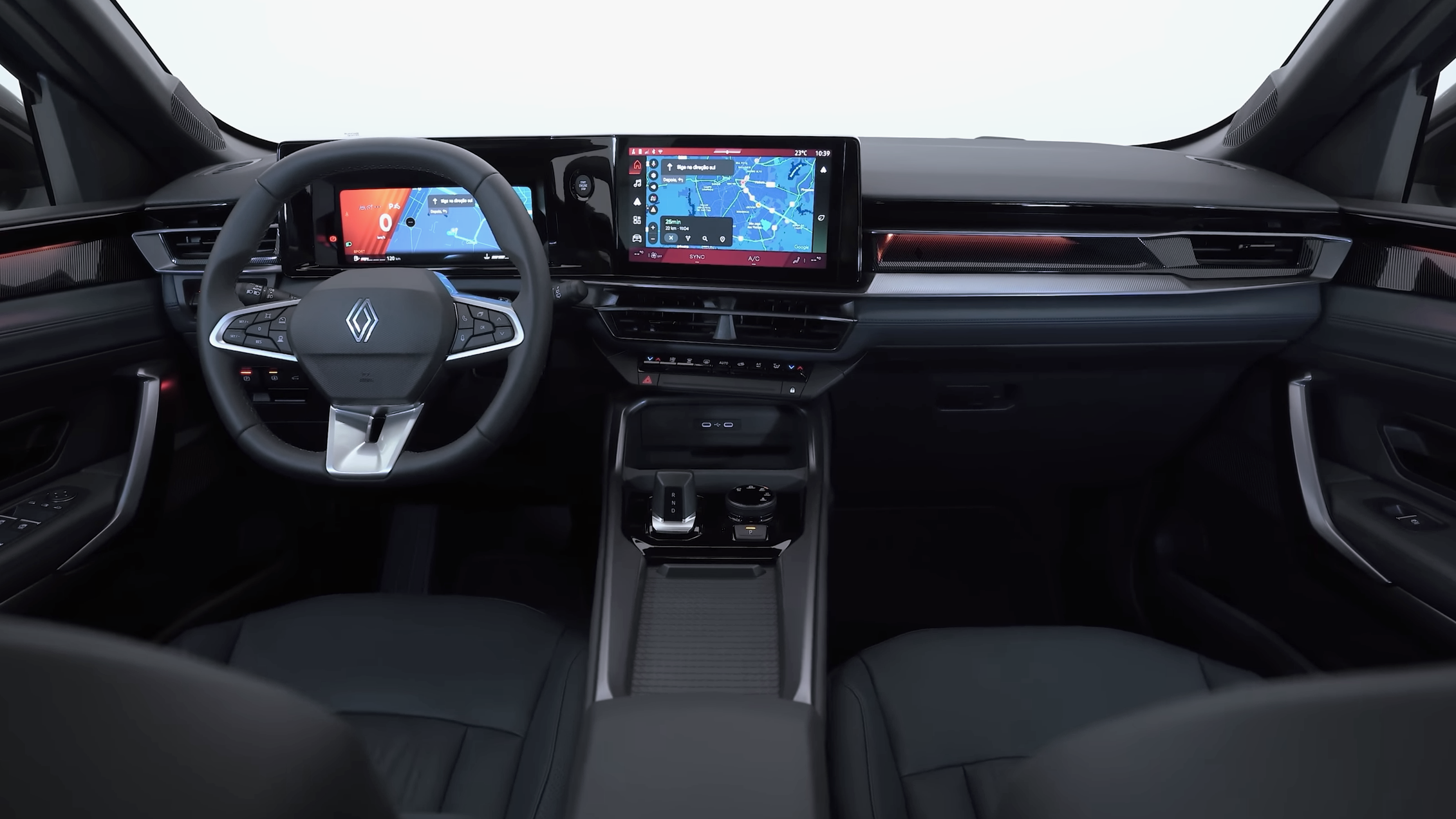
Interior

== Production ==
Calendar year	Production	
Calendar year	Turkey	Brazil
2025	54	6,632
