= Renault Duster Oroch =

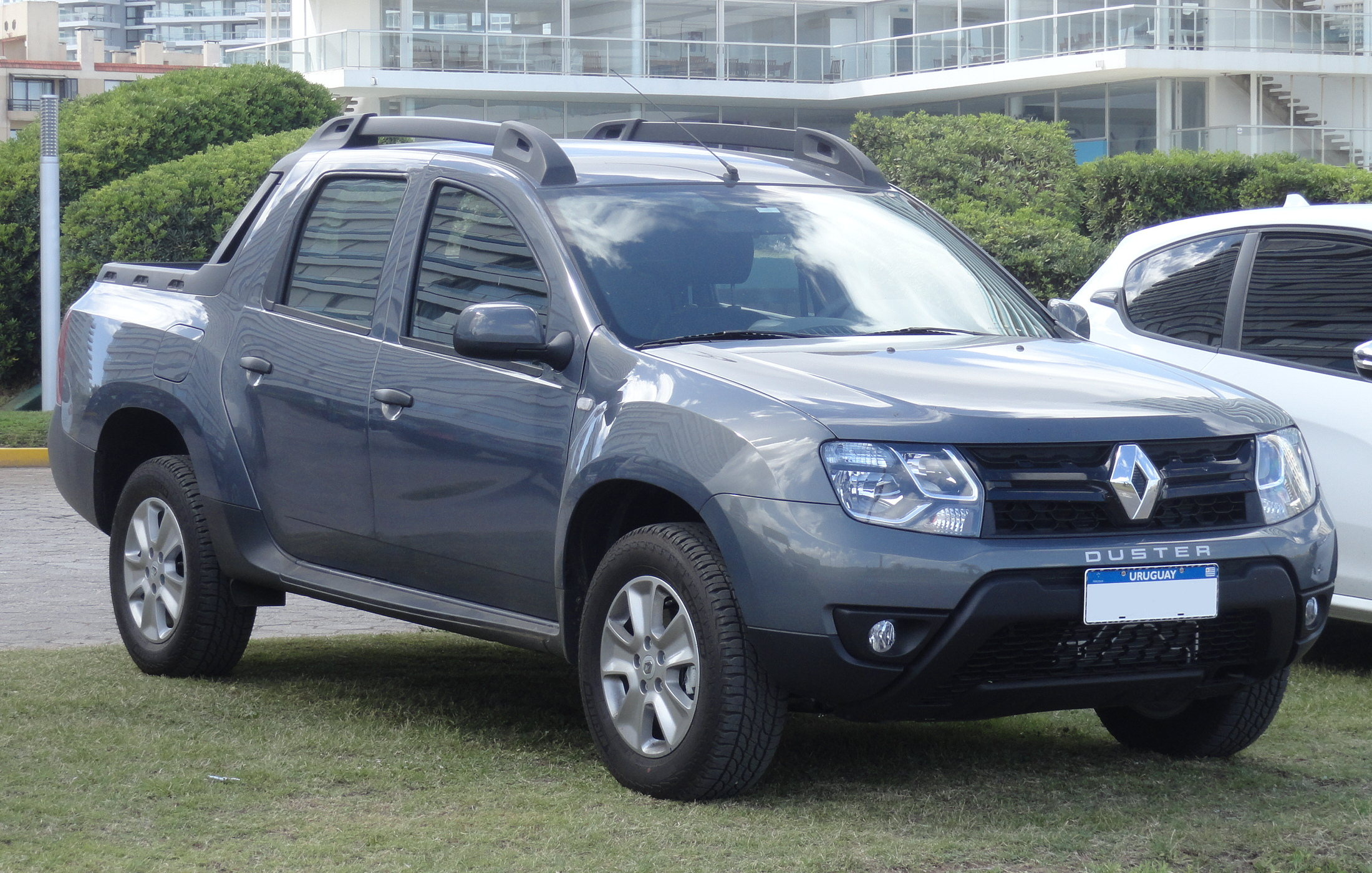
- Renault Duster Oroch (2016)

Overview
- Manufacturer: Renault
- Also called: Renault Duster Oroch (2015–2022)
- Production: 2015–2026
- Assembly: Brazil: São José dos Pinhais (Renault do Brasil); Colombia: Envigado

Body and chassis
- Class: Compact pickup truck
- Body style: 4-door pickup truck
- Layout: Front-engine, front-wheel-drive Front-engine, four-wheel-drive
- Related: Renault Duster

Powertrain
- Engine: 1.3 L turbo flex fuel I4; 1.6 L gasoline/flex fuel I4; 2.0 L gasoline/flex fuel I4
- Transmission: 5/6-speed manual; 4-speed automatic; CVT

Dimensions
- Wheelbase: 2,829 mm (111.4 in)
- Length: 4,700 mm (185.0 in)
- Width: 1,822 mm (71.7 in)
- Height: 1,694 mm (66.7 in)

Chronology
- Successor: Renault Niagara

The Renault Duster Oroch (renamed to Renault Oroch in 2022) is a 4-door compact pickup truck produced by the French manufacturer Renault from September 2015 to 2026, primarily for the South American market. It has four doors, space for five passengers, a 680 kg (1,499 lb) payload capacity and a 683 litres (150 imp gal; 180 US gal) rear volume.

It is based on the Dacia Duster SUV, with a wheelbase extended by 155 mm (6.1 in) and a total length extended to 4.7 metres (15 ft). This is the first Renault-badged pick-up and it creates a new size class for pickup trucks in terms of size, space and doors.

== Overview ==
The Renault Duster Oroch was originally developed by Renault Technlogie Roumanie in Romania. The Duster Oroch concept car was presented at the 2014 São Paulo Motor Show. The production version was officially released at the 2015 Buenos Aires Motor Show and has been on sale in South America since September 2015.

The bed size is 1,175 mm (46.3 in) wide and 1,350 mm (53.1 in) long, and has a capacity of 683 litres (24.1 cu ft).

It is powered by either a 1.6-litre or a 2.0-litre petrol 16-valve four-cylinder engine, mated to a 5-speed or 6-speed gearbox respectively. A version with an automatic gearbox was released in 2016.

In April 2022, the Oroch received an update (revised exterior and interior design, new security equipments, new infotainment system), accompanied by dropping the "Duster" part of the model name. It is now powered by either the 1.6 litre with 118 PS (87 kW) or a new 1.3-litre turbo engine producing 170 PS (125 kW).

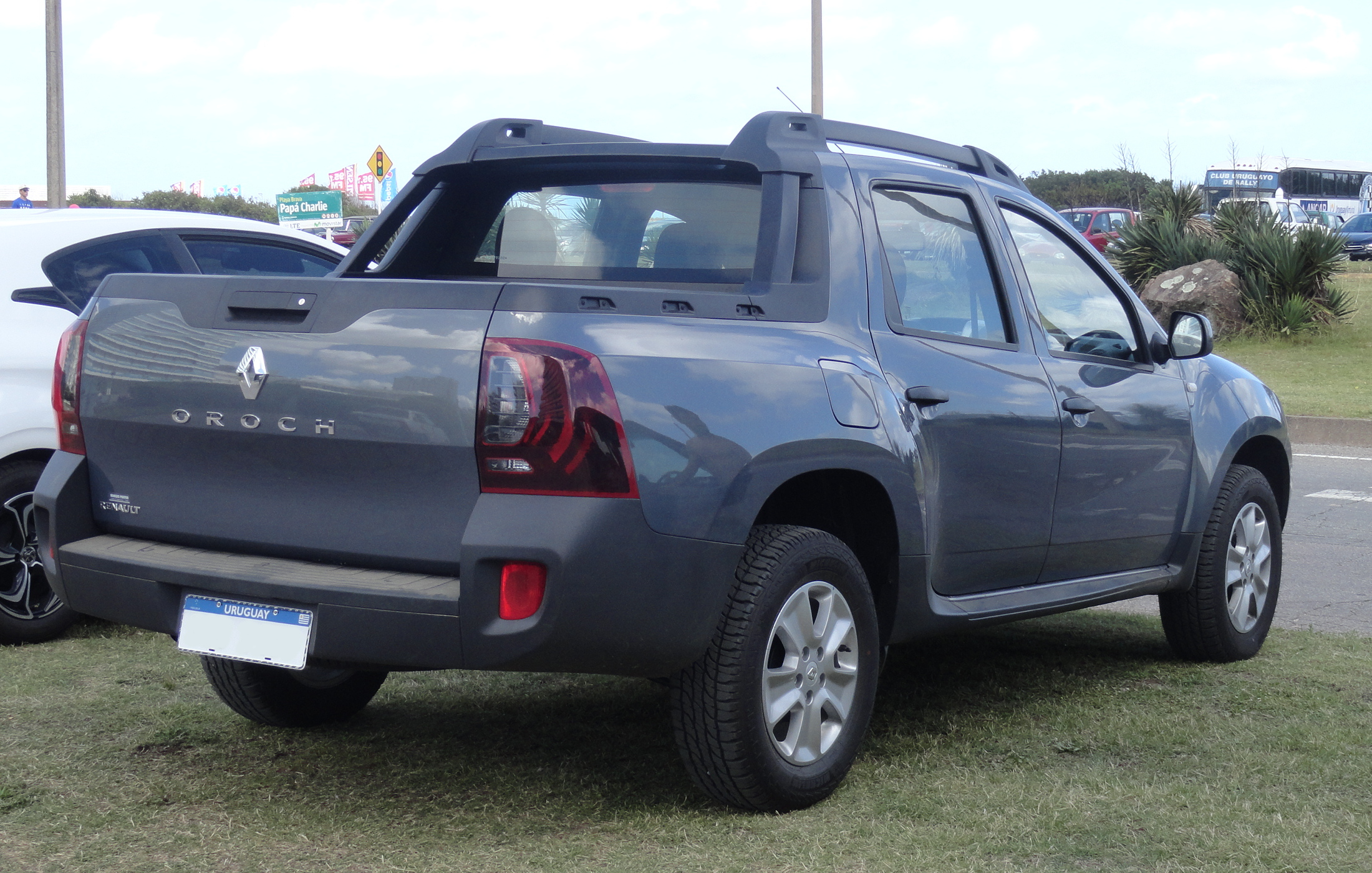
Rear view (pre-facelift)

== Awards ==
The Renault Oroch has received several "Best Pickup Truck of the Year" awards in 2016 by Revista Autoesporte, Car and Drivers Brasil "CAR Magazin" and 10Best.

== Sales ==
Year	Brazil
2015	3,201
2016	14,247
2017	11,048
2018	13,411
2019	13,363
2020	6,071
2021	12,133
2022	12,009
2023	12,734
2024	12,886
2025	11,624
