= Santa Fe Provincial Police =

Santa Fe Provincial Police Policía de la Provincia de Santa Fe

Agency overview
- Formed: 1864; 162 years ago
- Employees: 20,000

Jurisdictional structure
- General nature: Local civilian police

Operational structure
- Headquarters: Santa Fe, Argentina
- Agency executive: Luis Maldonado, Commissioner
- Parent agency: Ministry of Security of Santa Fe Province

Facilities
- Stations: 19

The Santa Fe Provincial Police (Spanish: Policía de la Provincia de Santa Fe, "PPSF") is an Argentine police agency, responsible for policing the Santa Fe Province.

== History ==
The first police functions were ejecutioned by Majors and Councilor designed by the Cablido, which was the Government of the Province by then.

By 1578 Councilor Don Bernabé de Luxán established that Major, as stated in the records of the Cabildo of Santa Fe. After the wars for the Independence of Argentina, the Cabildo would be lose representativeness

In 1833, with the purpose of "solving the administration of the Province of Santa Fe", it was promulgated a regulation that established the position of Chief of Police (amongst others) that had been carried out by the Cabildo until then.

== Organization ==
A new set of ranks have been in use since 2007:

- Director General de Policia (Director General of Police)
- Director de Policia (Director of Police),
- Subdirector de Policia (Deputy Director of Police),
- Comisario Supervisor (Commissioner Supervisor),
- Comisario (Commissioner),
- Subcomisario (Deputy Commissioner),
- Inspector (Inspector),
- Subinspector (Deputy Inspector),
- Official de Policia (Police Officer),
- Suboficial de Policia (Police deputy Officer)

This makes the SFPP one of several that sport a unique rank system.
