= Argentine Federal Police =

Argentine federal law enforcement agency

Coordinates: 34°36′47″S 58°23′17″W

Argentine Federal Police Policía Federal Argentina

- Abbreviation: PFA
- Motto: Al Servicio de la Seguridad de Estado; To serve the community

Agency overview
- Formed: December 24, 1943; 82 years ago
- Preceding agencies: Policía de Buenos Aires (1580–1880); Policía de la Capital (1880–1943)

Jurisdictional structure
- Federal agency (Operations jurisdiction): Argentina
- Operations jurisdiction: Argentina
- Legal jurisdiction: As per operations jurisdiction
- General nature: Federal law enforcement; Civilian police

Operational structure
- Headquarters: Departamento Central de Policía, 1650 Moreno Street, Montserrat, Buenos Aires
- Sworn members: 25,000
- Agency executives: Juan Carlos Hernández, Chief, Comisario General; Osvaldo Mato, Deputy Chief, Comisario General

Website
- argentina.gob.ar/policiafederal
- The Policía Federal Argentina, while a federal agency, also provides direct policing to the capital city Buenos Aires

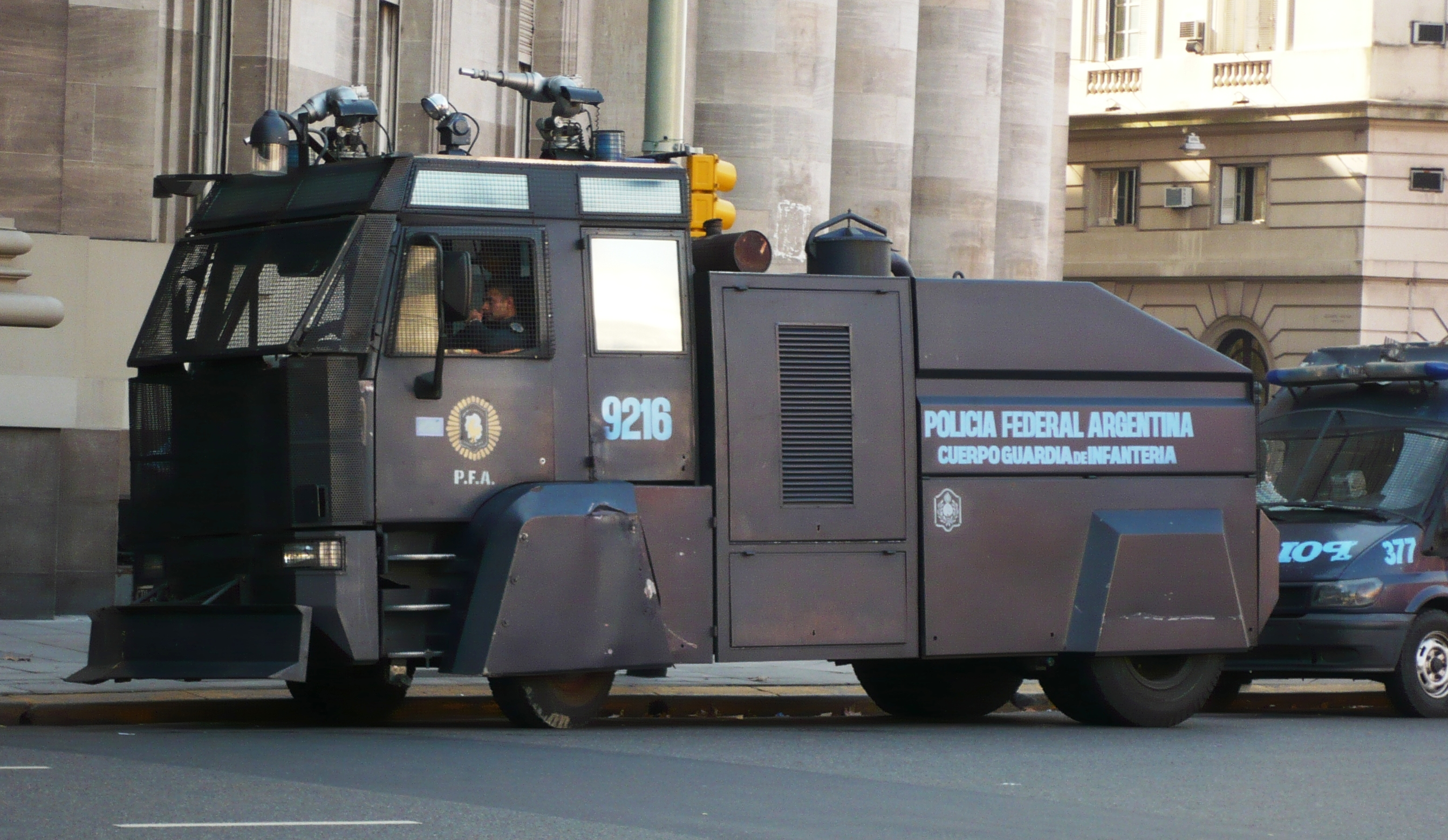
Riot control vehicle of the Policía Federal, Buenos Aires, 2008

The Argentine Federal Police (Spanish: Policía Federal Argentina or PFA) is the national civil police force of the Argentine federal government. The PFA has detachments throughout the country. Until January 1, 2017, it also acted as the local law enforcement agency in the capital, Buenos Aires.

== History ==
The history of this police force can be traced to 1580, when the founder of Buenos Aires, Captain Juan de Garay, established a local militia for defense against potential Native American raids. The Policía de Buenos Aires (Buenos Aires Police) operated for the first three hundred years up to 1880, when the Federalization of Buenos Aires resulted in the creation of the Policía de la Capital (Police of the Capital).

Incidents of social unrest in subsequent years helped prompt the Fraga Law in 1904, which provided for the inclusion of neighborhood representatives as commissioners in their respective precincts. The failed Revolution of 1905, by which the UCR sought to bring about reforms to the undemocratic electoral system, led to the appointment of a conservative congressman, retired Col. Ramón Falcón, to the post of chief of police; Falcón's repressive tenure ended with his 1909 assassination.

The current entity resulted from an initiative by the chief of police, Col. Emilio Ramírez, assisted by LTCOL Enrique Fentanes. A panel convened by the police chief presented its findings to support the establishment of the Federal Police on November 8, 1943, and on December 24, Decree 17.750 was signed by President Pedro Pablo Ramírez (the father of the chief of police). The new force did not immediately replace the Capital Police, but was instead transferred duties under the latter's purview incrementally. The first important such transfer was the February 7, 1944, assignment as the Presidential Guard of the Casa Rosada, and on March 10, the process of unifying the two forces was initiated by decree, concluding officially on January 1, 1945.

The Federal Police changed slowly in its organizational structure in subsequent decades. Initially maintaining 45 precincts, it added five in 1946, two in 1976, and a 53rd in 1999. Its subordinate role to the national executive increasingly made the force a political instrument during the country's often authoritarian regimes. General Juan Carlos Onganía, president after a 1966 coup, named a Federal Police director, Luis Margaride, who shared his distaste for modern culture, resulting in crusades against nightclubs, long hair, and miniskirts. Facing a government policy backdrop such as this, numerous avant-garde artists (and others, particularly in academia) left Argentina, many never to return. The return of exiled President Juan Perón in 1973 resulted in conflict with the PFA, when the calculating populist had Alberto Villar named as chief at the behest of adviser José López Rega. Villar was a member of López Rega's newly organized paramilitary group, the Argentine Anticommunist Alliance, and Villar's participation in spiraling violence between the group and those on the far left led to his assassination in 1974. The institution's prestige was further damaged following the March 1976 coup, when the force participated in the abduction, torture and murder of thousands of dissidents and others. It was only with the 1983 presidential elections (and the return to democratic rule) that the FP began restoring its prestige and its relations with the Argentine people, especially with the 1986 appointment of Juan Angel Pirker as police commissioner general.

The 1993 Olivos Pact between President Carlos Menem and his predecessor, UCR leader Raúl Alfonsín resulted in the 1994 reform of the Argentine Constitution, whose article 129 granted the City of Buenos Aires greater self-governance. This in principle included the transfer of control of the 25,000-strong Federal Police to the Jefe de Gobierno (elected Mayor), and the Buenos Aires City Legislature. Shortly before the historic, June 30, 1996, elections to these posts, however, a senior Peronist Senator, Antonio Cafiero, succeeded in limiting the city's autonomy by advancing National Law 24.588, which reserved control of the force, among other faculties, to the national government.

The controversial bill, signed in 1996 by President Menem, remained a sticking point between successive Presidents (most of whom have been Peronist) and Buenos Aires Mayors (none of whom have been). A 2005 agreement on principles between Mayor Aníbal Ibarra and President Néstor Kirchner was followed by the modification of the especially contentious article 7, which denied the city its own, local police force, in 2007 - though the "Cafiero Law" otherwise remains in force. Efforts since 2007 by Mayor Mauricio Macri to declare it unconstitutional have thus far failed, and though the Mayor inaugurated a Metropolitan Police, issues of revenue sharing for its financing remain pending.

The PFA, since 1974, maintains a university specializing in criminology, is associated with Interpol, and participates in special forces training programs at the Los Angeles Police Department.

In January 2017, most of the Federal Police agents serving in the city of Buenos Aires were transferred to a new local law enforcement agency, the Buenos Aires City Police. The new agency took over the local policing responsibilities in the capital city.

== General organization ==
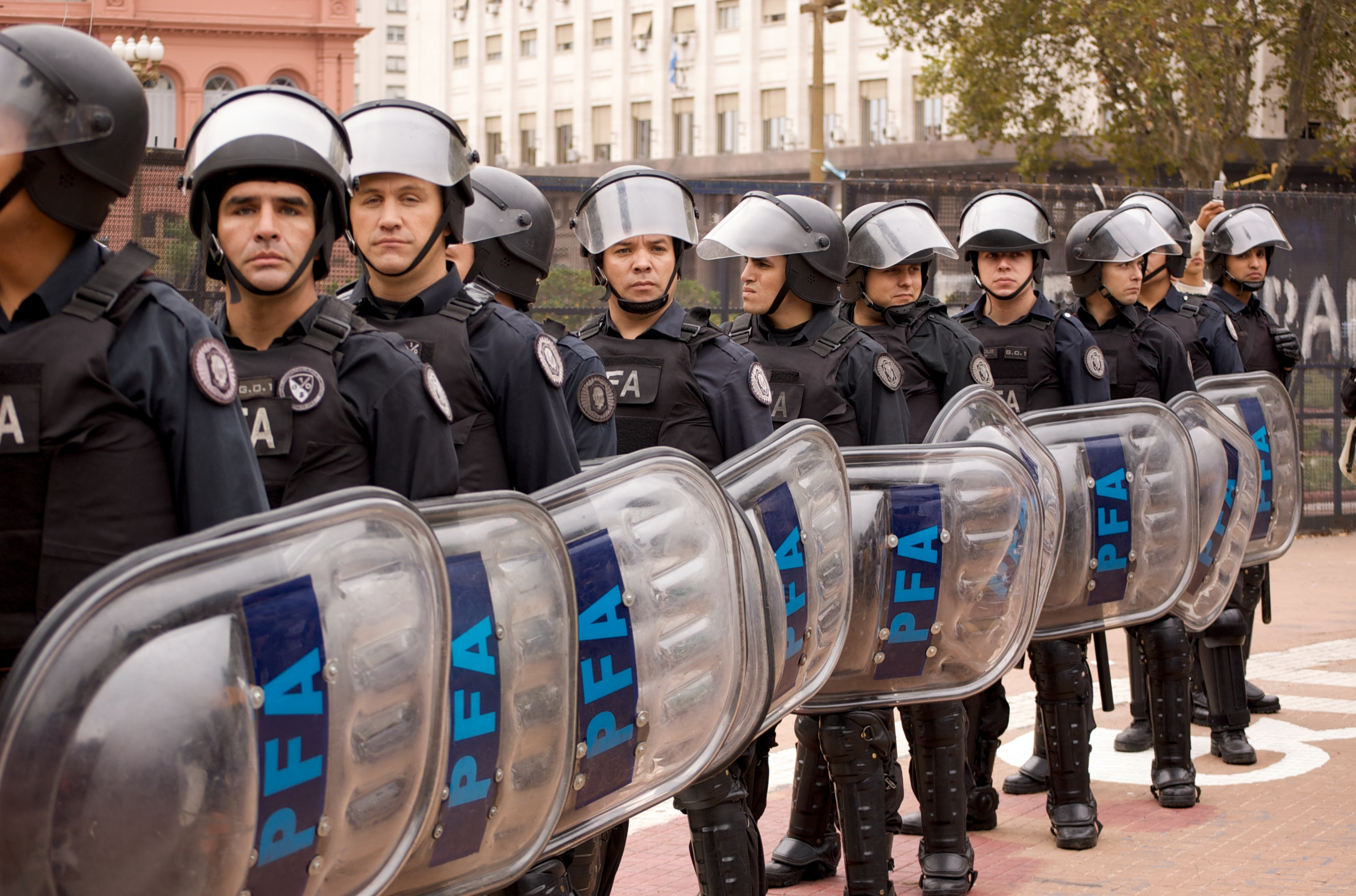
PFA officers during the 2008 Olympic Torch Relay in Buenos Aires

The PFA is subordinate to the Ministry of National Security. The organization is headed by the Chief of the PFA, the Comisario General Juan Carlos Hernández, assisted by the Deputy Chief of the PFA, Comisario General Osvaldo Mato.

The PFA's headquarters, known as the Departamento Central de Policía, is located at 1650 Moreno Street, in the Montserrat section of Buenos Aires. The over 12,000 m^{2} (128,000 ft²) resulted from an 1868 proposal for its construction, which was ultimately approved in 1884. Designed by Juan Antonio Buschiazzo, and engineered by Francesco Tamburini, the ornate headquarters is an eclectic structure with influences from Baroque architecture, and features a number of patios, notably the central, Palm Tree Patio. Argentine Passports were issued to local residents at this location until 1996.

The organization of the PFA is as follows:

- Jefatura (General Headquarters)
- Subjefatura (Subheadquarters)
- Superintendencias (Superintendencies)
    - Superintendencia de Administración (Superintendency of Administration)
    - Superintendencia de Bienestar (Superintendency of Welfare)
    - Superintendencia Federal de Bomberos (Federal Firefighting Superintendency)
    - Departamento Federal de Investigaciones de la PFA (Department of Federal Investigation)
    - Superintendencia de Planificación y Desarrollo (Superintendency of Planning and Development)
    - Superintendencia de Personal, Instrucción y Derechos Humanos (Superintendency of Personnel, Instruction and Human Rights)
    - Superintendencia de Policía Científica (Superintendency of Scientific Police)
    - Superintendencia Federal de Tecnologías de la Información y Comunicaciones (Federal Superintendency of Information Technologies and Communications)
    - Superintendencia de Interior y Delitos Federales Complejos (Superintendency of Interior and Federal Complex Crimes)
    - Superintendencia de Drogas Peligrosas (Superintendency of Dangerous Drugs)
    - Superintendencia de Asuntos Internos (Superintendency of Internal Affairs)
    - Superintendencia Federal de Transporte (Federal Superintendency of Transportation)
  - Direcciones Generales Autónomas (General Autonomic Directorates)
    - Dirección General Autónoma de Asuntos Jurídicos (General Autonomic Directorate of Legal Affairs)
    - Dirección General Autónoma de Asuntos Internos (General Autonomic Directorate of Internal Affairs)

Superintendencies are commanded by a superintendente, a less common word in Spanish. Both superintendente and the much more common Spanish word comisario normally translate into English as superintendent, which creates some translation problems when discussing Argentine police services.

Training for all serving agents of the service is done by the following institutions:

- Federal Police Agents and NCOs School "Commissioner General Alberto Villar"
- Federal Police Academy "Colonel (AA) Ramon Falcon"
- Federal Police Staff College "Commissioner General Enrique Fentanes"

Aside from its former stations in Buenos Aires, it maintains provincial stations in select capital cities and several towns of the Provinces of Argentina. The FFS also doubles as the state fire service as well.

== Special forces ==
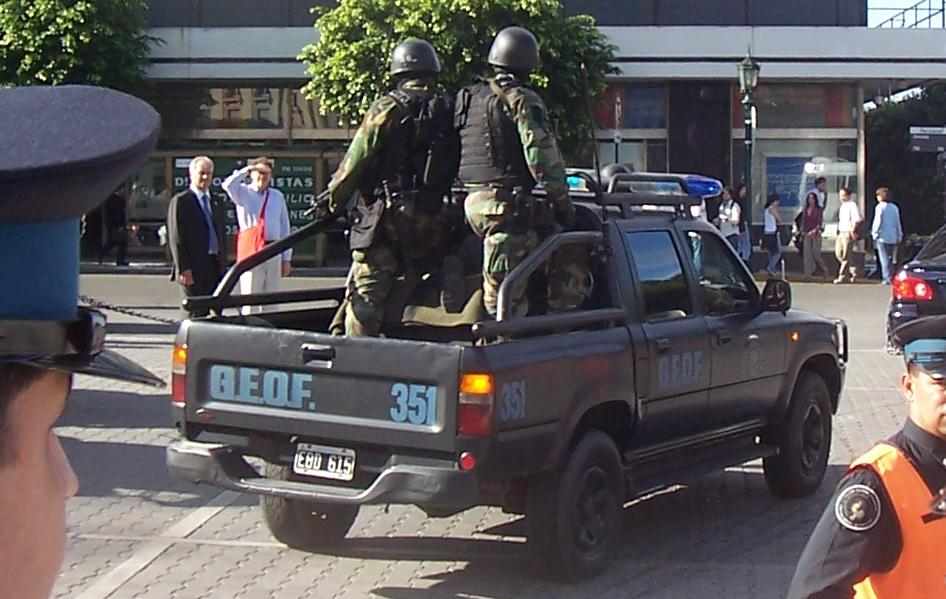
Grupo Especial de Operaciones Federales (GEOF)

=== Federal Operations Special Group (G.E.O.F) ===
The GEOF is a specialized police unit of the General Directorate of International Terrorism and Complex Crimes. Although the existence of special forces in Argentina begins in 1930, the unit was officially created after the 1994 AMIA bombing. In 1994 its first section was established in Tucumán and in 1997 a second division was constituted in Rosario. In the next year the Buenos Aires group was formed.

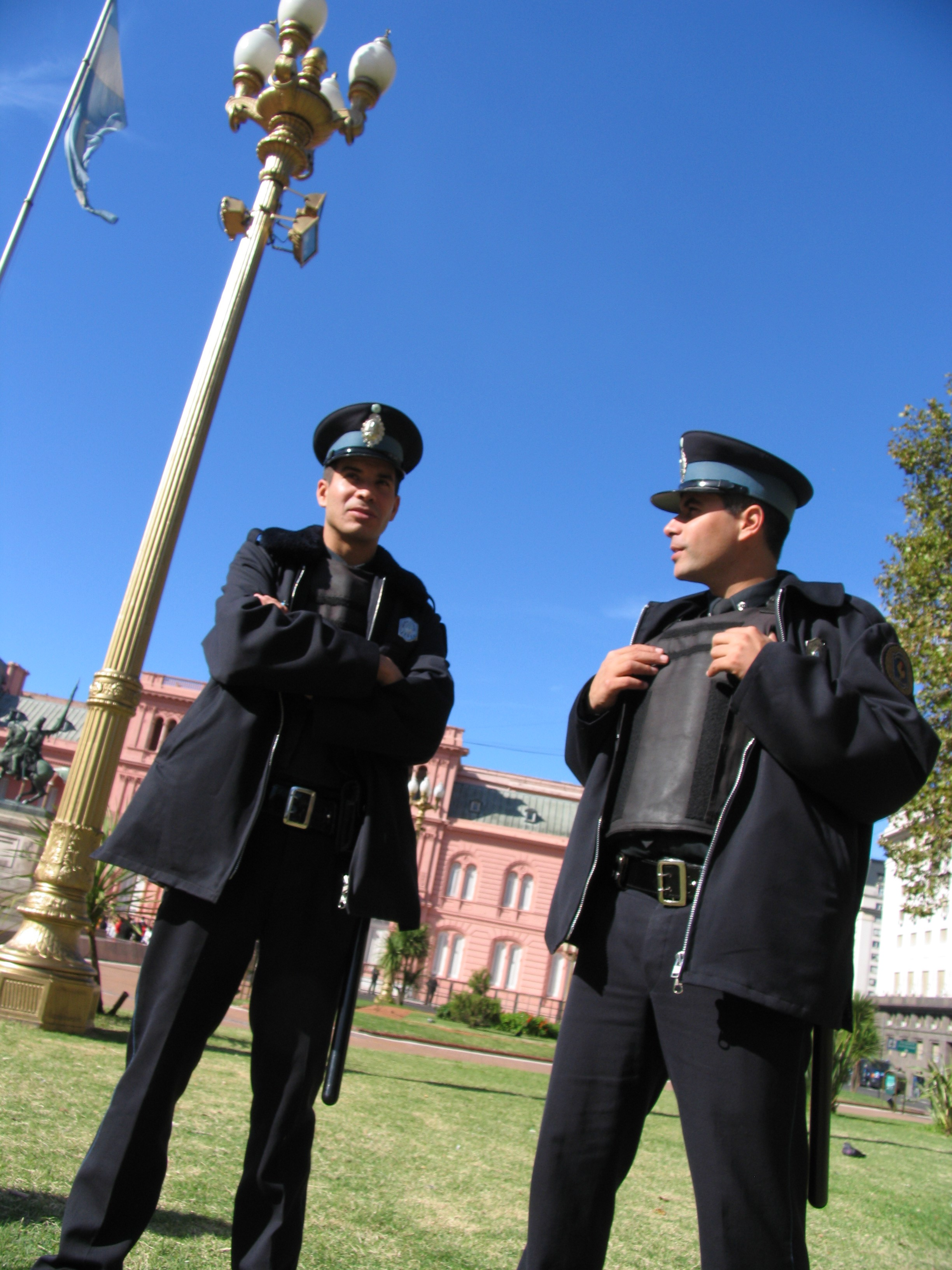
Agents of the Argentine Federal Police in Plaza de Mayo, Buenos Aires, 2004.

=== Special Group One ===
The unit was established under the denomination of Special Combat Teams in 1978, when Argentina hosted the Football World Cup. Ten years later, in 1988, the division changed its name to Police Operations Group and officially became the premier counter-terrorism team of the Federal Police.

== Police ranks ==
Officer Ranks (in descending order)

Rank	Approximate English translation	Badge of rank
Comisario General - Jefe de Policia	Superintendent-General / Commissioner-General - Chief of Police	Four gold pips above a gold band & wreath
Comisario General	Superintendent-General or Commissioner-General	Three gold pips above a gold band & wreath
Comisario Mayor	Superintendent-Major or Commissioner-Major	Two gold pips above a gold band & wreath
Comisario Inspector	Superintendent-Inspector or Commissioner-Inspector	One gold pip above a gold band & wreath
Comisario	Superintendent or Commissioner	Two gold pips above a gold band
Subcomisario	Sub-commissioner	One gold pip above a gold band
Oficial Principal	Principal Officer	Three silver pips
Oficial Inspector	Inspector Officer (or just Inspector)	Two silver pips
Oficial Sub-Inspector	Sub-inspector Officer (or just Sub-Inspector)	One silver pip above one gold pip
Oficial Ayudante	Adjutant Officer or Assistant Officer	One silver pip

Constable and NCO Ranks (in descending order)

Rank	Approximate English translation	Badge of rank
Suboficial Mayor	Senior Sub-Officer	Four chevrons above an Austrian knot
Suboficial Auxiliar	Auxiliary Sub-Officer	Three chevrons above three arcs
Suboficial Escribiente	Clerk Sub-Officer or Administrative Sub-Officer or Staff Sub-Officer	Three chevrons above two arcs
Sargento Primero	First Sergeant	Three chevrons above an arc
Sargento	Sergeant	Three chevrons
Cabo Primero	Corporal	Two chevrons
Cabo	Lance Corporal	One chevron
Agente / Bombero	Officer / Firefighter
Aspirante	Candidate or Cadet

== Equipment ==
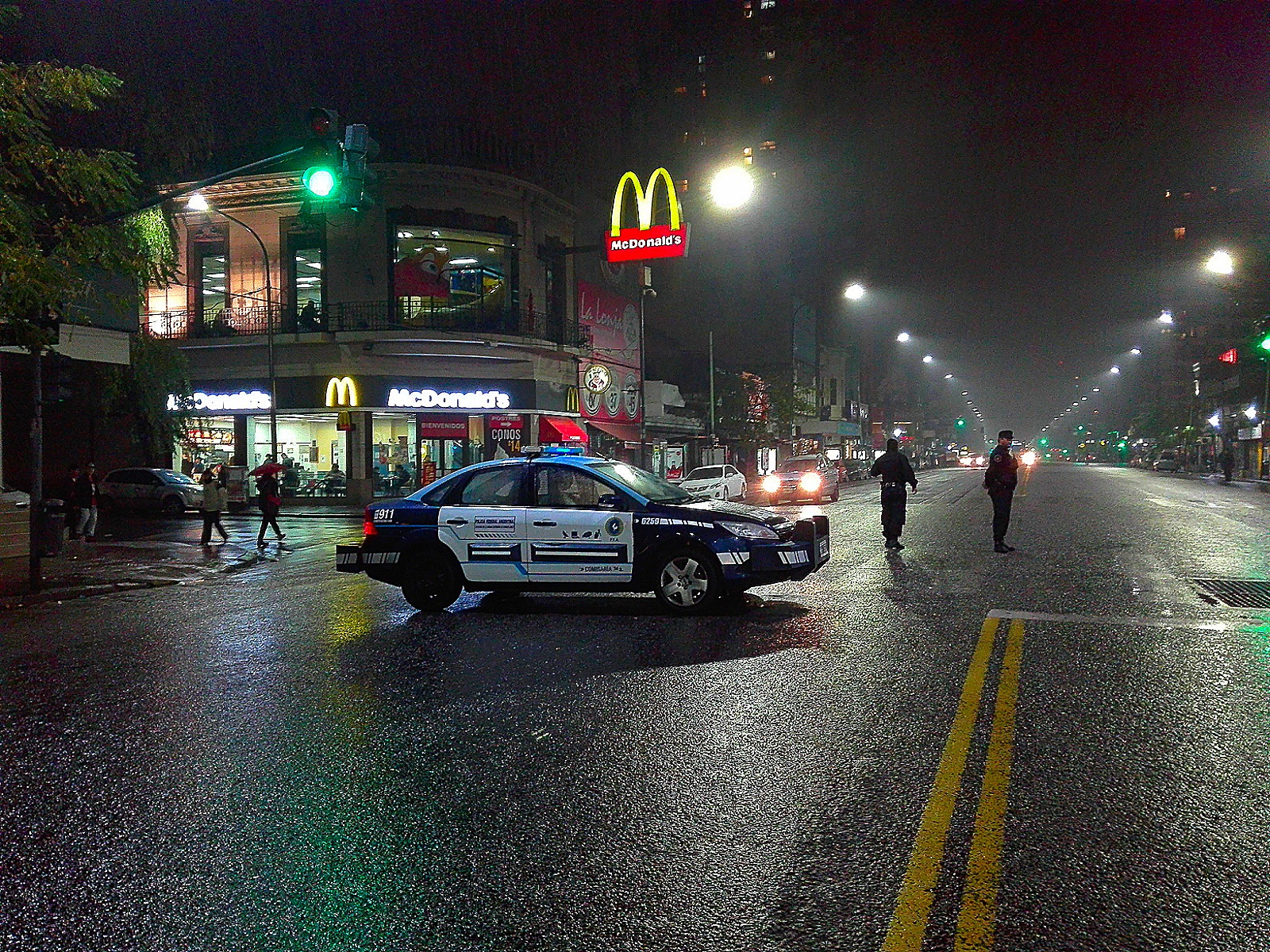
Ford Focus of the PFA

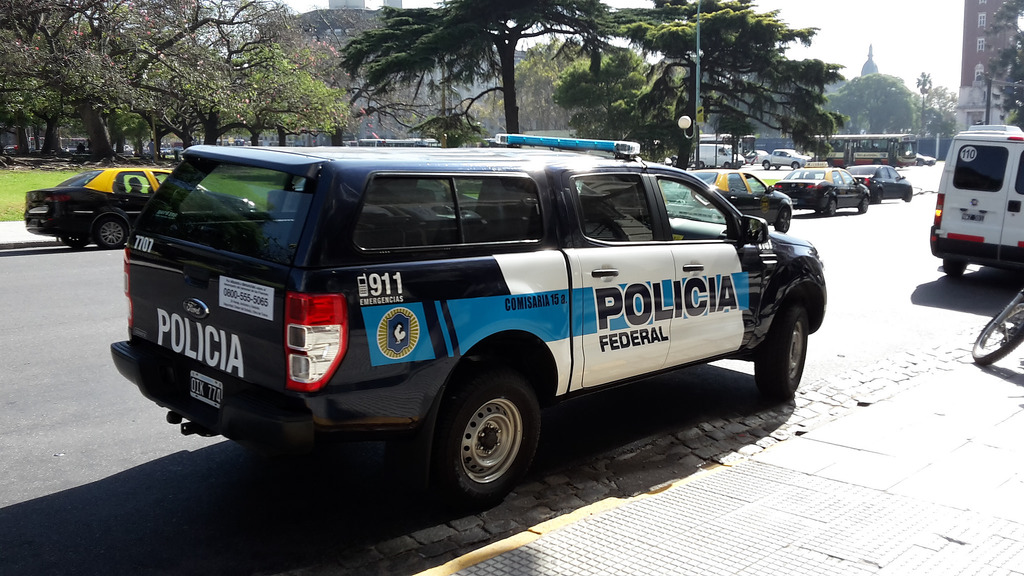
Ford Ranger of the PFA

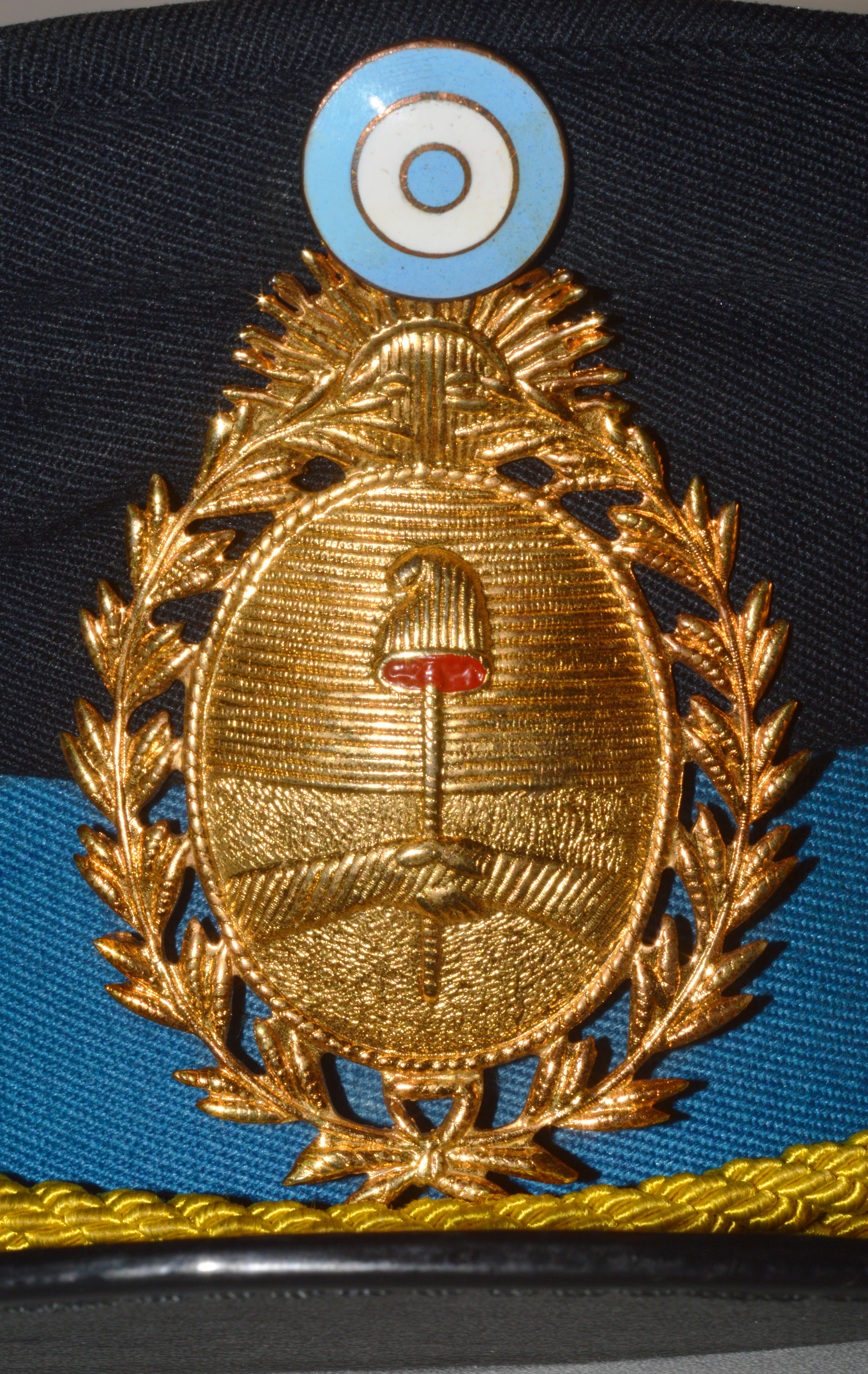
Emblem on the PFA's peaked cap (Full image at File:PFA Peaked Cap.jpg)

=== Aircraft ===
The Dirección General de Aviación Federal is a unit of PFA agents, responsible for transportation policeman to anywhere in the country, besides the air support operations to the Federal Police. It has multipurpose aircraft for health functions, VIP transport, search, patrol, fire fighting, rescue and tactical operations. Its operational base is the heliport of Isla Demarchi (Heliport Dársena Sur). Its current fleet includes:

- MBB Bo 105
- MBB/Kawasaki BK 117
- Eurocopter EC135
- Eurocopter EC145
- Cessna Citation I
- Cessna 421

=== Vehicles ===
- Ford Focus
- Ford Ranger
- Chevrolet Classic
- Iveco Daily
- Mercedes-Benz Sprinter
- BDX
- Dongfeng Mengshi

=== Firearms ===
Weapon	Origin	Type
Bersa Thunder 9	Argentina	Semi-automatic pistol
Glock 17	Austria	Semi-automatic pistol
Beretta 92	Italy	Semi-automatic pistol
FMK-3	Argentina	Submachine gun
Halcón ML-63	Argentina	Submachine gun
Heckler & Koch MP5	Germany	Submachine gun
Uzi	Israel	Submachine gun
Remington 870	United States	Shotgun
Ithaca 37	United States	Shotgun
FN FAL	Argentina; Belgium	Assault rifle
Heckler & Koch HK33	West Germany	Assault rifle
SIG SG 552 Commando	Switzerland	Assault rifle
IWI ACE	Israel	Assault rifle
FN Minimi	Belgium	Machine gun
FN MAG	Belgium	Machine gun
IWI Negev	Israel	Machine gun
M24 SWS	United States	Sniper rifle
H-S Precision HTR	United States	Sniper rifle
M110 SASS	United States	Sniper rifle
