= List of police tactical units =

This is a list of active police tactical units.

== Definition ==
Police tactical units are specialized units of a police force tasked with resolving high risk / critical incidents, including:

- high risk armed offender / suspect searches / apprehensions including arrest warrants
- high risk search warrants involving an armed / dangerous offender / suspect
- siege / barricade incidents involving an armed offender / suspect
- domestic counter-terrorism incidents such as hostage rescue and / or armed intervention (including units that may be granted authority for overseas operations)

In the United States, police tactical units are known by the generic term Special Weapons and Tactics (SWAT) team (other countries have adopted this term, including China). In Australia, the term police tactical group is used for police tactical units. The European Union uses the term special intervention unit for national counter terrorist police tactical units.

== Albania ==
Albanian State Police

- RENEA
- Shqiponjat
- FNSH

== Algeria ==
Sûreté Nationale

- Police Special Operations Group (French: Groupement des Opérations Spéciales de la Police, GOSP)
- Research and Intervention Brigade (BRI)

Gendarmerie Nationale

- Special Intervention Detachment (DSI)

== Andorra ==
Police Corps of Andorra

- Grup d'Intervenció Policia d'Andorra' (GIPA)

== Angola ==
Angola National Police Force

- Rapid Intervention Police (PIR)

== Antigua and Barbuda ==
Royal Police Force of Antigua and Barbuda

- Special Service Unit

== Argentina ==
Argentine Federal Police

- Federal Special Operations Group (GEOF)
- Grupo Especial Uno "GE-1" (Special Group One)

Argentine National Gendarmerie

- Equipo Antiterrorista (Anti-Terrorist Team)
- Scorpion Group – Formerly the Escuadrón Especial de la Gendarmería Nacional
- Sección Operaciones Especiales de Monte de Gendarmería Nacional "Groupe Monte" ('National Gendarmarie Jungle Special Operations Section')
- Unidad Especial de Lucha Contra Narcotraficante (UELCON)

Argentine Naval Prefecture

- Albatross Group
  - Grupo de Respuesta Imediata de Alto Riesgo (GRIAR; 'Immediate High Risk Response Group')

Airport Security Police

- Special Tactical Assault Group (Grupo Especial de Asalto Táctico, GEAT)

Argentine Federal Penitentiary Service

- Special Intervention Group (Grupo Especial de Intervención, GEI)

Local and other units

- Hawk Special Operations Brigade (BEOH) – Buenos Aires Provincial Police
- Special Operations Troops Company (TOE) – Santa Fe Provincial Police
- Equipo Táctico Especial Recomendado (E.T.E.R.) – Córdoba Provincial Police
- División Operaciones Especiales Metropolitanas (DOEM) - City Police of Buenos Aires
- Policía de Alto Riesgo (PAR) - Corrientes Provincial Police
- División de Operaciones Especiales “Kuntur” (DOE Kuntur) - Catamarca Provincial Police
- Grupo Especial de Operaciones Policiales (GEOP) - Chubut Provincial Police
- Grupo Especial de Seguridad (GES) - Mendoza Provincial Police

== Armenia ==
National Security Service

- Alpha Group

Police of Armenia

- Police tactical unit

== Australia ==
Australian Federal Police

- Tactical Response Team (TRT)

New South Wales Police Force

- Tactical Operations Unit (TOU)
- Tactical Operations Regional Support (TORS)

Northern Territory Police

- Territory Response Group (TRG)

Queensland Police

- Special Emergency Response Team (SERT)

South Australia Police

- Special Tasks and Rescue Group (STAR)

Tasmania Police

- Special Operations Group (SOG)

Victoria Police

- Special Operations Group (SOG)
- Critical Incident Response Team (CIRT)

Western Australia Police

- Tactical Response Group (TRG)

New South Wales Corrective Services

- Security Operations Group (SOG)

Western Australia Department of Corrective Services

- Special Operations Group (SOG)

== Austria ==
Federal Ministry of the Interior

- EKO Cobra – Special operations and counterterrorism unit

Federal Police

- WEGA
- Linz Special Services Police Inspectorate
- SIG (Schnelle Interventionsgruppe)

Justizwache (Penitentiary police)

- Justizwache Einsatzgruppe (JEG) – Penitentiary police SWAT

== Azerbaijan ==
Ministry of Internal Affairs

- OPON
- Rapid Police Unit

== Bahamas ==
Royal Bahamas Police Force

- Security and Intelligence Branch

== Bahrain ==
Public Security Forces

- Special Security Force Command

== Bangladesh ==
Bangladesh Police

- Rapid Action Battalion
- Counter Terrorism and Transnational Crime
- Anti Terrorism Unit
- Special Weapons and Tactics (SWAT)
- Crisis Response Team

== Barbados ==
Barbados Police Service

- Tactical Response Unit

== Belarus ==
Militsiya

- Almaz Special Anti-Terrorism Unit (SPBT Almaz)
- OMON (AMAP) Special Purpose Police Unit
- Special Rapid Response Unit

== Belgium ==
Federal Police

- Federal Police Special Units (DSU; Directorate of the Special Units)

Local Police

- Peloton Anti-Banditisme (PZ 5277) - Liège
- Groupe d'Interventions Spéciales (PZ 5303) - Namur
- Groupe d'Appui Spécialisé Proactif (GASP - PZ 5324) - Mons and Quévy
- Groupe Alpha (PZ 5325) - La Louvière
- Groupe Spécial d'Appui (GSA - PZ 5330) - Charleroi
- Service d'Assistance Spéciale (SAS-PZ 5331) - Châtelet
- Brigade Anti-Agression / Anti-Overvalbrigade (PZ 5339) - Bruxelles
- Brigade Anti-Banditisme (BAB-PZ 5340) - Bruxelles-West and Molenbeek
- Special Response Unit (PZ 5341) - Bruxelles-South
- Bijstands Team d'Appui (BTA-PZ 5344) - Bruxelles-North and Schaerbeek
- Arrestatie Eenheid (PZ 5345) - Anversa
- Special Assistance Unit (PZ 5364) - Turnhout
- Community Orientend Police Support Team (COPS-PZ 5415) - Ghent
- Tactisch Responsteam (PZ 5456) - Kortrijk
- Unité d'Appui Spécialisé (UAS-PZ 5297) - Arlon
- DELTA (PZ 5327) - Borinage
- FLAG (PZ 5342) - Uccle / Watermael-Boitsfort / Auderghem
- Ondersteuningscapaciteit Risicovolle en Complexe Operaties (ORCO-PZ 5440) - Aalst
- Cel Overbrenging Bescherming Reactie Arrestatie (COBRA-PZ 5444) - Bruges
- Team voor Handhaving van Openbare orde en Rust (THOR-PZ 5449) - Oostende
- Arrestatie En Steun (PZ 5904) - Waasland and Noord
- Speciale Assistance Unit Tactische Intervention Groep (PZ 5907) - Hasselt
- FALCO (PZ 5905) - Halle

== Bhutan ==
Royal Bhutan Police

- Special Reserve Police Force

== Bolivia ==
Bolivian National Police

- Unidad Tactica de Operaciones Policiales (UTOP) – Tactical Response Unit
- Special Force to Fight Drug Trafficking (FELCN) – Bolivian anti-narcotics force
  - Mobile Police Unit for Rural Areas (UMOPAR)
- Fuerza especial de lucha contra el crimen (FELCC) – Bolivian anti-criminal force

== Bosnia and Herzegovina ==
Bosnian Police Force

- State Investigation and Protection Agency (SIPA)
  - Special Support Unit

Other units

- MUP FBiH Federal Counter-terrorism branches
  - Special Police Unit
- MUP RS Counter-terrorism branches
  - Police of Republika Srpska
    - Specijalna antiteroristička jedinica (SJP)
    - Žandarmerija
    - Posebne snage policije

== Botswana ==
Botswana Police Service

- Special Support Group (SSG)

Directorate of Intelligence and Security

- Special Task Team (STT)

== Bulgaria ==
Ministry of Interior

- Main Directorate of Gendarmerie, Special Operations and Counter-Terror
  - SOBT

General Directorate Combating Organized Crime

- GDBOP tac teams

Bulgarian Gendarmerie

- СТЗБД-МВР

== Brazil ==
National Public Security Force

- Quick Deployment Special Battalion

Federal Police Department

- Comando de Operações Táticas (COT) – is a specialized counter terrorism unit with headquarters in Brasília
- Grupos de Pronta Intervenção (GPI) – are SWAT like tactical units that supports local operations. Each state has its own G.P.I. unit

Polícia Militar

- BOE/BOPE (Batalhão de Operações Especiais) units:
  - Special Operations Battalion (PMAC) – in Acre
  - Special Operations Battalion (PMDF) – in the Federal District
  - Specials Battalion Operations (PMMT) – in the state of Mato Grosso
  - Special Operations Battalion (PMPR) – the state of Paraná
  - Special Operations Battalion (PMPI) – the state of Piauí
  - Special Police Operations Battalion (PMAL) – the state of Alagoas
  - Special Police Operations Battalion (PMRR) – in the state of Roraima
  - Special Police Operations Battalion (PMSC) – the state of Santa Catarina
  - Special Police Operations Battalion (PMERJ) – in the state of Rio de Janeiro
  - Special Police Operations Battalion (PMRN) – in Rio Grande do Norte state
  - Special Police Operations Battalion (PMBA) – the state of Bahia
  - Special Police Operations Battalion (PMRS) – in Rio Grande do Sul state
  - Special Police Operations Battalion (PMAP) – in Amapá state
  - Special Police Operations Battalion (PMMG) – is a GATE type unit of the Military Police of Minas Gerais State
- Tobias de Aguiar Ostensive Patrols (ROTA) – An elite ostensive patrol battalion and quick reaction force of the Military Police of São Paulo State.
- Group of Special Tactical Actions (GATE) – A special operation Forces of the Military Police of São Paulo State tasked with hostage rescue operations And Counter-Terrorism.
- Commandos and Special Operations (COE) – A special forces unit of the Military Police of São Paulo State, tasked with operations against violent crime in complex environments such as favelas, forest regions and at sea. Both GATE and COE are part of the 4th Shock Police Battalion.

Policia Civil

- Grupo Tático 3 (GT3) – in the state of Goiás
- Grupo Especial de Reação (GER) – is tactical unit similar to GOE operating in the state of São Paulo
- Grupo de Operações Especiais (GOE) – is the elite arm of the Civil Police of the state of São Paulo
- Centro de Operações Policiais Especiais (COPE) – is a specialized division within the civil police of Paraná state
- Tático Integrado de Grupos de Repressão Especial (TIGRE) – is a SWAT type tactical unit that specializes in hostage rescue operations in the state of Paraná
- Coordenadoria de Recursos Especiais (CORE) – is a paramilitary police unit within the Civil Police of Rio de Janeiro State
- Divisão de Operações especiais (DOE) – is a special tactics unit based in Federal District
- Grupo de Operações Especiais (GOE) – is the GOE unit of the state of Pernambuco

== Brunei ==
Royal Brunei Police Force

- Special Operations Squad (SOS; Malay: Pasukan Gerak Khas — PGK)

== Canada ==
Federal units

- Royal Canadian Mounted Police (RCMP; French: Gendarmerie royale du Canada – GRC)
  - Emergency Response Team (ERT; French: Groupe Tactique d’intervention – GTI)
- Parliamentary Protective Service (PPS; French: Service de protection parlementaire) – Mobile Response Team
- Correctional Service of Canada (CSC; French: Service correctionnel du Canada)
  - Institutional Emergency Response Team (IERT)
  - Institutional Crisis Intervention Team (ICIT)

Provincial and Municipal units

- Abbotsford Police Department – Emergency Response Team
- Barrie Police Service – Tactical Support Unit (TSU)
- Bathurst Police Force – Emergency Response Team (ERT)
- Brandon Police Service – Tactical Response Unit (TRU)
- Brantford Police Service – Emergency Response Team (ERT)
- Brockville Police Service – Emergency Response Team (ERT)
- Calgary Police Service – Tactical Unit
- Cape Breton Regional Police Service – Emergency Response Team (ERT)
- Service de police de la MRC des Collines-de-l'Outaouais – Unité spéciale d’intervention
- Charlottetown Police Service - Priority Tactical Response and Containment Team
- Cornwall Police Service – Cornwall Emergency Response Team (CERT)
- Durham Regional Police Service – Tactical Support Unit
- Edmonton Police Service – Tactical Unit
- Estevan Police Service - Containment / Warrant Entry Team (CWET) and Joint Tactical Support Team with Weyburn Police Service
- Fredericton Police Force - Emergency Response Team
- Service de police de la Ville de Gatineau – Groupe d’intervention
- Greater Sudbury Police Service – Tactical Unit
- Guelph Police Service – Tactics and Rescue Unit
- Halifax Regional Police – Emergency Response Team (ERT)
- Halton Regional Police Service – Tactical Rescue Unit (TRU)
- Kingston Police – Emergency Response Unit
- Service de police de la Ville de Laval – Groupe d’intervention
- London Police Service – Emergency Response Unit (ERU)
- Service de police de l'agglomération de Longueuil – Groupe d’intervention
- Miramichi Police Force and Bathurst Police Force – Miramichi/Bathurst Joint Emergency Response Team
- Moose Jaw Police Service - Tactical Response Team (TRT)
- Service de Police de la Ville de Montreal – Groupe Tactique d’intervention
- Niagara Regional Police Service – Emergency Task Unit (ETU)
- Ontario Provincial Police
  - Tactics and Rescue Unit (TRU)
  - Emergency Response Team (ERT)
- Ottawa Police Service – Tactical Unit
- Peel Regional Police – Tactical and Rescue Unit
- Service de police de la Ville de Québec – Groupe Tactique d'intervention
- Regina Police Service – SWAT (Regina)
- Royal Newfoundland Constabulary – Tactics and Rescue Unit (TRU)
- Saskatoon Police Service – Tactical Support Unit (TSU)
- Saint John Police Force & Kennebecasis Regional Police Force – Emergency Tactical Services (ETS)
- South Simcoe Police Service – Containment Team/Emergency Response Unit (ERU)
- Stratford Police Services – Emergency Response Unit (ERU)
- Sûreté du Québec – Groupe d'intervention tactique
- Thunder Bay Police Service – Emergency Task Unit (ETU)
- Toronto Police Service – Emergency Task Force (ETF)
- Vancouver Police Department – Emergency Response Team (ERT)
- Victoria Police Department & Saanich Police Department – Greater Victoria Emergency Response Team
- Waterloo Regional Police Service – Special Response Unit
- Weyburn Police Service - Joint Tactical Support Team with Estevan Police Service
- Windsor Police Service – Tactical Unit
- Winnipeg Police Service – Tactical Support Team (TST)
- Woodstock Police Service – Containment Team
- York Regional Police – Emergency Response Unit (ERU)
- Atlona Police Service, Morden Police Service & Winkler Police Service – Regional Support Tactical Team

Other units

- Atomic Energy of Canada Limited (AECL) – Nuclear Security Response Team
- Bruce Power – Nuclear Response Team (NRT)
- Canadian Nuclear Laboratories – Nuclear Response Force (NRF)
- NB Power – Nuclear Response Team (NRT)
- Ontario Power Generation – Nuclear Security

== Chile ==
Carabineros de Chile

- Grupo de Operaciones Policiales Especiales (GOPE; 'Police Special Operations Group')

Chilean Investigation Police (Policía de Investigaciones de Chile)

- Equipo de Reacción Táctica Antinarcóticos (ERTA; 'Antinarcotics Tactical Response Team')

Chilean Gendarmerie (Prison Service)

- Sección de Operaciones Tácticas (SOT; 'Tactical Operations Section')

== People's Republic of China ==
Given the numerous police tactical units in the country, only a partial list of examples is provided below:

People's Police

- Public Security Police
  - Local public security bureaus
    - Beijing Municipal Public Security Bureau Counter-Terrorism and Special Police Department
    - Shanghai Municipal Public Security Bureau Special Police Department
      - Shanghai Municipal Public Security Bureau Zhabei subbureau SWAT team (defunct)
    - Guangzhou Municipal Public Security Bureau SWAT division
    - Xi'an Municipal Public Security Bureau SWAT division
    - Sichuan Provincial Public Security Department SWAT unit
    - Liangshan Prefectural Public Security Bureau SWAT division
    - Daishan County Public Security Bureau SWAT team
    - Puge County Public Security Bureau SWAT team
    - Dingxi Municipal Public Security Bureau SWAT division
    - Meishan Municipal Public Security Bureau SWAT division
    - Guiyang Municipal Public Security Bureau SWAT division
    - Qiandongnan Prefectural Public Security Bureau SWAT division
    - Ili Prefectural Public Security Bureau SWAT division
    - Markam County Public Security Bureau SWAT team
    - Qidong County Public Security Bureau Patrol and Anti-Riot team (Note: Despite the name, the unit also has tasks similar to police tactical units such as arresting high-risk criminals and anti-terrorism)
    - Gonggar County Public Security Bureau SWAT team
    - Zunyi Municipal Public Security Bureau Bozhou Division SWAT team
    - Yueyang Municipal Public Security Bureau SWAT division
    - Jinan Municipal Public Security Bureau SWAT division
      - Black Leopard Commando team
      - Huaiyin Subbureau SWAT team
    - Minhou County Public Security Bureau SWAT and Anti-terrorism team
    - Anqing Municipal Public Security Bureau SWAT division
    - Xuzhou Municipal Public Security Bureau Quanshan Subbureau SWAT team
    - Zhenjiang Municipal Public Security Bureau SWAT division
    - Old Barag Banner Public Security Bureau Gyrfalcon Mounted Police Team
  - MPS Railway Public Security Bureau
    - Shenyang Railway Public Security Bureau, Dalian Railway Public Security Office, SWAT division
    - Nanchang Railway Public Security Bureau, Fuzhou Railway Public Security Office, SWAT division
  - CAAC Public Security Bureau
    - Beijing Capital International Airport Public Security Bureau SWAT division
  - National Immigration Administration:
    - Hulunbuir Border Management Detachment, Barga Commando Unit
- Judicial Administrative Police
  - Guangdong Prison Administrative Bureau Yingde Prison SWAT team
  - Sichuan Provincial Prison Administrative Bureau Ya'an Prison SWAT team
  - Beijing Municipal Administration of Prisons Qingyuan Prison SWAT team
  - Guizhou Provincial Prison Administrative Bureau Baiyun Prison SWAT team
  - Sichuan Provincial Prison Administrative Bureau Qiaowo Prison Female SWAT team
  - Guangdong Prison Administrative Bureau Panyu Prison SWAT team
- Court Judicial Police
  - Yulin City Intermediate People's Court Judicial Police SWAT team

People's Armed Police

- Mobile Units
  - 1st Special Operations Detachment, 1st Mobile Corps (Falcon Commando Unit)
  - 2nd Special Operations Detachment, 1st Mobile Corps (Overseas Guards Special Operations Detachment)
  - 3rd Special Operations Detachment, 1st Mobile Corps
  - 1st Special Operations Detachment, 2nd Mobile Corps (Snow Leopard Commando)
  - 2nd Special Operations Detachment, 2nd Mobile Corps
- Internal Guard Corps
  - People's Armed Police Xinjiang Corps Special Operations Detachment (Mountain Eagle Commando)
  - People's Armed Police Hebei Corps Mobile Detachment 1st Special Operations Company (Sky sword unit)
  - People's Armed Police Shanghai Corps, 2nd Mobile Detachment, Special Operations Company
  - People's Armed Police Shandong Corps Special Operations Detachment
  - People's Armed Police Guizhou Corps special operations detachment
  - People's Armed Police Liangshan detachment special operations Company
  - People's Armed Police Jinan detachment mobile battalion Special Operations Company (Lightning Commando unit)
  - People's Armed Police Zhaotong detachment Special Operations Company
  - People's Armed Police Pu'er detachment Special Operations company
  - People's Armed Police Shenzhen Detachment Special Operations Company (Wild Wolf unit)
  - People's Armed Police Ningxia Corps Mobile Detachment Special Operations Battalion

=== Hong Kong ===
Hong Kong Police Force

- Airport District
  - Airport Security Unit (ASU)
- Counter Terrorism and Major Incidents Bureau
  - Counter Terrorism Response Unit (CTRU)
  - Special Duties Unit (SDU)
- Crime Wing
  - Operation Support Unit (Hit Team)
- Marine Police
  - Maritime Emergency Response Team (MERT)

Hong Kong Correctional Services

- Correctional Emergency Response Team (CERT)
- Regional Response Team (RRT)

Independent Commission Against Corruption

- Witness Protection and Firearms Section

Immigration Department

- Emergency Response Team (ERT)

=== Macau ===
Public Security Police Force

- Police Tactical Intervention Unit
  - Special Operations Group (GOE)

Judicial Police

- Special Response Team (GRE)

Correctional Services Bureau

- Tactical Response Unit

== Taiwan (Republic of China) ==
National Police Agency (NPA)

- Special Operations Group (SOG)
- Criminal Investigation Bureau Special Tactical Unit (CIB STU)

Local Police Departments

- Thunder Squads

Coast Guard Administration (CGA)

- Special Task Unit (STU)

== Colombia ==
National Police of Colombia

- (COPES) Comandos de Operaciones Especiales (Special Operations Commandos)
- (JUNGLA) Jungle
- (GOES) Grupo de Operaciones Especiales (Special operations group) (SWAT equivalent)

== Costa Rica ==
Department of Intelligence and Security

- Special Intervention Unit (UEI)

== Croatia ==
Special Police

- Lučko Anti-Terrorist Unit (ATJ Lučko)
- Zadar special police units (Zadar County police administration)
- Bjelovar special police units (Bjelovar-Bilogora County police administration)
- Osijek special police units (Osijek-Baranja County police administration)
- Slavonski Brod special police units (Brod-Posavina County police administration)
- Split special police units (Split-Dalmatia County police administration)
- Special Police Units (SJP Split "BATT", SJP Rijeka "AJKULA", SJP Osijek "ORAO")
- Riot Police Units- EPZ (Ekipa za Posebne Zadaće) tactical platoon within Intervention/riot police

== Cuba ==
Ministry of the Interior (Cuba)

- Special National Brigade, abbreviated SNB

== Cyprus ==
Cyprus Police

- Mobile Immediate Action Unit (MMAD)

== Czech Republic ==
Police of the Czech Republic

- Útvar rychlého nasazení [ÚRN/URNA] Rapid Reaction Unit, national police CT unit
- Krajská zásahová jednotka – [KZJ] 8 regional police intervention units

Celní správa České republiky

- Skupina operativního nasazení – [SON]

== Denmark ==
Rigspolitiet

- Politiets Aktionsstyrke (Special Intervention Unit)

Københavns Politi (Copenhagen Police Department)

- Udrykningssektionen (First Response Unit)

== Ecuador ==
National Police of Ecuador

- Grupo de Operaciones Especiales (GOE)
- Grupo de Intervención y Rescate (GIR)

== Egypt ==
Ministry of Interior

- Egyptian Homeland security
  - Unit 333
- Central Security Forces
  - Black Cobra (Counterterrorism special unit)
  - Special operations forces

== Estonia ==
Police and Border Guard Board

- K-Commando (Special unit of the Central Crime Police)
- Kiirreageerimisüksused (Rapid response units of the 4 prefectures)

== Fiji ==
Fiji Police Force

- Police National Operations Support Unit
- Police Special Response Unit (PSRU)

== Finland ==
Police of Finland

- Police Rapid Response Unit

== France ==
National Police

- Recherche Assistance Intervention Dissuasion (RAID). RAID is composed of a central unit based in Bièvres (near Paris) and 13 regional branches named Antennes du RAID. The 13 Regional branches are located in metropolitan and overseas France and were formerly known as GIPNs.
- Brigade anticommando (BRI-BAC). The Paris Police Prefecture (PP) anti-terrorism task force. It is activated in emergency situations. BRI-BAC is primarily composed of personnel from the Paris Police Prefecture Brigade de recherche et d'intervention (BRI-PP) (from the Judiciary Police directorate) with reinforcements from other PP units. Although the official name of the unit when activated is Brigade anticommando, it is often simply referred to by the press as BRI (which can be confusing as there are BRIs in each region of France). Groupes d'Intervention de la Police Nationale (GIPN) are tactical units of the French National Police based in large cities in metropolitan France and in French overseas territories.

In an emergency situation, BRI-BAC and RAID can also form a task-force called FIPN (Force d'intervention de la Police nationale), under the command of the RAID commander.

Gendarmerie

- Groupe d'Intervention de la Gendarmerie Nationale (GIGN; "National Gendarmerie Intervention Group"). GIGN is composed of a central unit based in Versailles-Satory, near Paris and 14 regional branches based in metropolitan and overseas France which are known as Antennes du GIGN (AGIGN).
- Pelotons spécialisé de protection de la Gendarmerie (PSPG). 20 units primarily dedicated to protecting the French civilian nuclear sites. Can be engaged as tactical units in a secondary role.

Helicopter support for GIGN and RAID

- Groupe interarmées d'hélicoptères (GIH). A joint army/air force helicopter unit belonging to COS (Commandement des opérations spéciales : Special operations command). Its primary role is support of GIGN and RAID.

Ministry of Justice

- Équipes régionales d'intervention et de sécurité (ERIS, "Regional Intervention and Security Teams"). Unit under the command of the carceral administration, formed partially by the GIGN, to intervene inside prison in case of particular events (riots, mutiny, evasion, terrorism).

== Ghana ==
Ghana Police Service

- National SWAT Unit

== Georgia ==
State Security Service of Georgia

- Counterterrorist Center
- Special Operations Center

Ministry of Internal Affairs of Georgia

- Counter Intelligence Department
- Special Emergency and Situations Management Center
- Central Anti Crime Department
- Regional Special Task Divisions

Special State Protection Service (SSPS)

- Tactical Response Group

== Germany ==
Federal

- Bundespolizei (Federal Police)
  - GSG 9 der Bundespolizei (GSG 9 or GSG 9 BPOL, formerly Grenzschutzgruppe 9 of the Bundesgrenzschutz) – Special Operations and Counter-Terrorism Tactical Intervention Unit
  - Beweissicherungs- und Festnahmeeinheit (BFE) – Evidence Preservation and Arrest Unit of the Federal Readiness (Riot) Police (Bundesbereitschaftspolizei) for violent crime
  - Beweissicherungs- und Festnahmeeinheit plus (BFE+) – Evidence Preservation and Arrest Unit Plus of the Federal Police for counter-terrorism
  - Polizeiliche Schutzaufgaben Ausland der Bundespolizei – Police Foreign Protection Tasks of the Federal Police: for German Diplomatic Missions
- Bundeskriminalamt (Federal Criminal Investigation Office)
  - Mobiles Einsatzkommando (MEK) – Mobile Deployment Force: primarily responsible for the investigation and apprehension of fugitives, also provides support for observation and arrests for the federal and state police
  - Auslands- und Spezialeinsätze (ASE) – Foreign and Special Deployments: Close protection unit for safeguarding members of the federal constitutional bodies when traveling to crisis areas, as well as their high-risk guests from abroad
- Zollkriminalamt (Customs Criminal Investigation Office)
  - Zentrale Unterstützungsgruppe Zoll (ZUZ) – Customs Central Support Group: Equivalent to the State Police SEK units
- Feldjäger (Military Police)
  - Zugriffskräfte – Tactical Action Force

State

- Landespolizei (State Police)
  - Spezialeinsatzkommando (SEK) – Special Deployment Force of the state police forces
  - Beweissicherungs- und Festnahmeeinheit (BFE) – Evidence Preservation and Arrest Unit of the State Readiness (Riot) Police (Bereitschaftspolizei) for violent crime
  - Mobiles Einsatzkommando (MEK) – Mobile Deployment Force: primarily responsible for the investigation and apprehension of fugitives, part of the State Police Forces

== Greece ==
Greek Police

- Special Anti-Terrorist Unit (EKAM)

Greek Coast Guard

- Underwater Missions Unit^{(el)} (ΜΥΑ - Greek: Μονάδα Υποβρυχίων Αποστολών, romanized: Monáda Ypovrychíon Apostolón) – counterterrorism unit authorized to conduct ship inspections, high-risk operations, hostage rescue, and dealing with specific violent crimes in a maritime environment, as well as carrying out specialized diving activities up to 120 meters.

== Guyana ==
Guyana Police Force

- Tactical Services Unit

== Haiti ==
Haitian National Police

- Le Groupe d'Intervention de la Police Nationale d'Haïti (GIPNH) – National Police Intervention Group

== Honduras ==
Honduran National Police

- special operations command (Comando de Operaciones Especiales, COECO)
- Intelligence Troop and Special Security Response Groups (Tropa de Inteligencia y Grupos de Respuesta Especial de Seguridad, TIGRES)

== Hungary ==
- Counter Terrorism Centre (TEK – Terrorelhárítási Központ)
- Készenléti Rendőrség (Crowd control Police)

== Iceland ==
Icelandic Police

- Víkingasveitin ('Viking Squad') – Special Operations Unit of the National Commissioner

== India ==
Law Enforcement in India

Federal

- National Security Guard
  - Special Action Group (SAG) – the main offensive or the strike wing of the NSG
    - 51 Special Action Group – counter-terrorism operations
    - 52 Special Action Group – counter-hijack operations
  - Special Ranger Group (SRG) – provides logistical support to the SAGs during operations
    - 11 Special Ranger Group
    - 12 Special Ranger Group
    - 13 Special Ranger Group
  - Special Composite Group (SCG) – conduct regional counter terror operations
    - 26 Special Composite Group in Mumbai
    - 27 Special Composite Group in Chennai
    - 28 Special Composite Group in Hyderabad
    - 29 Special Composite Group in Kolkata
    - 30 Special Composite Group in Gandhinagar
- Border Security Force (BSF)
  - Creek Crocodile Commando
- Railway Protection Force
  - Commandos for Railway Safety (CORAS)
- Anti-Terrorism Squad
- Central Reserve Police Force
  - Commando Battalion for Resolute Action (COBRA) – Special operation force of the CRPF
  - Rapid Action Force – A specialized riot control wing of CRPF
- Andhra Pradesh Police
  - Organisation for Counter Terrorist Operations
- Jammu and Kashmir Police
  - Special Operation Group (SOG) – specialized in anti-irregular military, apprehension of armed and dangerous criminals, counterinsurgency, counterterrorism and hostage rescue crisis management, and operating in difficult to access terrain
- Gujarat Police
  - Chetak Commandos
- Odisha Police
  - Special Operation Group (Odisha)
    - Special Tactical Unit – Urban counter-terrorist unit of the parent force
- Maharashtra Police
  - C-60 Commando force
  - Mumbai Police
    - Force One – specialized in anti-irregular military, apprehension of armed and dangerous criminals, counterterrorism and hostage rescue crisis management, executive protection, and providing security in areas at risk of attack or terrorism
- West Bengal Police
  - Counter Insurgency Force – Counter insurgency & Counter terrorism unit of West Bengal Police
- Greyhounds – Police special force unit operating in the Indian States of Andhra Pradesh and Telangana for anti-insurgency operations
- Punjab Police SWAT Team
- Kerala Police
  - Kerala Thunderbolts – specialized in anti-irregular military, apprehension of armed and dangerous criminals, counterinsurgency, counterterrorism and hostage rescue crisis management, executive protection, operating in difficult to access terrain especially in mountainous forest areas, providing security in areas at risk of attack or terrorism, and support search and rescue for victims of natural disasters

Protective Service Unit

- Special Protection Group
- SWAT teams of Punjab, Delhi & Jammu and Kashmir

== Indonesia ==
Indonesian National Police (POLRI)

- Mobile Brigade Corps (Indonesian: Korps Brigade Mobil) abbreviated as Brimob
  - Gegana is a detachment from Brimob which specializes in bomb disposal, counter-terrorism, CBR defense and intelligence operations.
- Detachment 88, known locally as (Densus 88) is the special counter-terrorism unit of the Indonesian National Police.

Directorate General of Customs and Excise (Bea Cukai)

- "Customs Tactical Unit" also known as "CTU" is the special unit of the Indonesian Customs

Maritime Security Agency (Bakamla)

- "Maritime Rapid Reaction Unit" (Unit Reaksi Cepat Laut) abbreviated as URCL.

== Iran ==
Iranian Police

- Iranian Police Special Units
  - Counter-terrorism Special Force

== Iraq ==
Iraqi Police

- Golden Counterterrorism Squad
- Hilla SWAT Team
- Special Police Commandos
- Wolf Brigade (Iraq)

== Ireland ==
Garda Síochána (National Police)

- Emergency Response Unit (ERU)
- Armed Support Unit (ASU)

== Israel ==
Israel Police

- Yasam
- Gidonim

Israel Border Police

- Yamam
- Yamas
  - Metilan

Israel Prison Service

- Nachshon
- Dror
- Metzada

== Italy ==
Carabinieri (National Gendarmerie)

- Gruppo di Intervento Speciale (GIS)
- Aliquota Primo Intervento, Squadre Operative Supporto (API, SOS)

Polizia di Stato (State Civil Police)

- Nucleo Operativo Centrale di Sicurezza (NOCS)
- Unità Operativa Primo Intervento (UOPI)

Polizia Penitenziaria (Penitentiary Police)

- Gruppo Operativo Mobile (GOM)

Guardia di Finanza (Border and Financial Police)

- Antiterrorismo Pronto Impiego (AT-PI)

== Jamaica ==
Jamaica Constabulary Force

- SWAT

== Japan ==
Security Bureaus of Prefectural police headquarters

- Special Assault Team (SAT) – national-level counter-terrorism units
- Anti-firearms squads – territorial-level counter-terrorism units

Criminal Investigation Bureaus of Prefectural police headquarters

- Special Investigation Team (SIT) – Akita/Iwate/Ibaraki/Miyagi/Fukushima/Tochigi/Tokyo/Shizuoka/Aichi/Mie/Fukuoka/Nagasaki
- Martial Arts Attack Team (MAAT) – Osaka
- Assault Response Team – Chiba
- Special Tactical Section – Saitama
- Special Investigation Section – Kanagawa
- Technical Special Team – Aomori
- Hostage Rescue Team – Hiroshima

Japan Coast Guard

- Special Security Team (SST) – national-level maritime counter-terrorism teams
- Special Riot Squads (特別警備隊, Tokubetsu-keibi-tai, "Tokkei-tai") – regional-level riot control and special reaction teams

== Jordan ==
General Directorate Of Gendarmerie

- Unit 14

GID

- GID Special Unit

== Kazakhstan ==
Ministry of Internal Affairs

- Arlan Special Purpose Unit;
- Sunkar Special Purpose Detachment
- National Guard
  - Berkut Special Forces Unit

== Kenya ==
Kenya Police Service

- General Service Unit (GSU)
  - Recce Company
    - Rapid Response Team (RRT)

Criminal Investigation Department

- Anti-Terrorism Police Unit (ATPU)

Administration Police Service

- Rapid Deployment Unit (RDU)
- Border Patrol Unit (BPU)
  - Special Operations Group (SOG)

== Kyrgyzstan ==
- Alpha (Elite police unit)
- Kalkan (Special Armed Unit)
- GSKN (Special Unit)
- GSIN (Special Unit)
- Shumkar (Special police unit)
- Sher (Anti-terrorist special unit)
- SOBR (Rapid response unit)

== Korea – ROK ==
Korean National Police Agency (KNPA)

- Special Operation Unit (SOU)
  - Seoul Metropolitan Police SOU – metropolitan area central SOU
  - Gyeonggi Nambu Provincial Police SOU
  - Gyeonggi Bukbu Provincial Police SOU
  - Incheon Metropolitan Police SOU
  - Busan Metropolitan Police SOU – Yeongnam area central SOU
  - Daegu Metropolitan Police SOU – inland area central SOU
  - Ulsan Metropolitan Police SOU
  - Gyeongbuk Provincial Police SOU
  - Gyeongnam Provincial Police SOU
  - Daejeon Metropolitan Police SOU
  - Chungbuk Provincial Police SOU
  - Chungnam Provincial Police SOU
  - Sejong City Police SOU – central area central SOU
  - Gwangju Metropolitan Police SOU
  - Jeonnam Provincial Police SOU
  - Gangwon Provincial Police SOU – Honam area central SOU
  - Jeonbuk Provincial Police SOU
  - Jeju Provincial Police SOU

Korea Coast Guard (KCG)

- Sea Special Attack Team (SSAT)
  - Korea Coast Guard Region-Central SSAT
  - Korea Coast Guard Region-East SSAT
  - Korea Coast Guard Region-West SSAT
  - Korea Coast Guard Region-South SSAT
  - Korea Coast Guard Region-Jeju SSAT

Presidential Security Service (PSS)

- Counter Assault Team (CAT)

ROK Military Police (MP)

- Special Duty Team (SDT)

== Kosovo ==
- IG EULEX (Intervention Group)

== Kuwait ==
- Kuwait Special Force (Al Quwat Al Khasa)
- Kuwait Swat team

== Latvia ==
State Police of Latvia

- Special Tasks Battalion (Latvian: Speciālo Uzdevumu Bataljons) former as Special Tasks Battalion "ALFA"
- Counter-terrorist unit "OMEGA" (Latvian: Pretterorisma vienība "OMEGA")

== Lebanon ==
Lebanese Internal Security Forces Directorate

- Black Panthers (Al Fouhoud) – Special Operations Unit
- Information Branch – Intelligence Unit

== Liechtenstein ==
Landespolizei

- Intervention Unit (German: Interventionseinheit (IVE))

== Lithuania ==
Police Department

- ARAS – Lithuanian Police Anti-terrorist Operations Unit (Lithuanian: Lietuvos policijos antiteroristinių operacijų rinktinė)
- Mobile Squads – Lithuanian Public Police Tactical Support, Riot Control, and Crimesupression units (Lithuanian: Lietuvos viešosios policijos mobili kuopa)

State Border Guard Service

- SPV "Kovas" – Special Purpose Command (Lithuanian: Specialios Paskirties Valdyba "Kovas")

Public Security Service

- ORKA – Operative Reaction Counterattack Squad (Lithuanian: Viešojo Saugumo Tarnybos Operatyvus Kontratakos Būrys)

Dignitary Protection Service

- Tactical Support Group – (Lithuanian: Vadovybės Apsaugos Tarnybos Taktinės Paramos Grupė)

== Luxembourg ==
Grand Ducal Police

- Unité Spéciale de la Police

== Madagascar ==
Malagasy National Police

- Specialized Units of the National Police (French: Unités spécialisées de la Police Nationale, USPN)
  - Special Intervention Unit (French: Unité spéciale d’intervention, USI)
  - Rapid Intervention Unit (Malagasy: Unité d’intervention Rapide, UIR)
  - Anti-Gang Service (French: Service Anti-Gang, SAG)

Malagasy National Gendarmerie

- National Gendarmerie Intervention Forces (French: Forces d’intervention de la Gendarmerie Nationale, FIGN)
- Security and Special Intervention Group (French: Groupement de sécurité et d’intervention spéciale, GSIS)

== Malaysia ==
Royal Malaysia Police

- Pasukan Gerakan Khas (PGK; 'Special Operation Command')
  - 69 Commando Battalion (VAT 69; Malay: Batalion Komando 69) – Police special forces unit that specialised in jungle warfare. Some also trained as a counter-terrorism unit.
  - Special Actions Unit (Malay: Unit Tindakhas — UTK) – Police special forces unit that specialised in counter-terrorism in the urban area and big cities. Some also assigned as close-protection to the top government executives.
- General Operations Force
  - Tiger Platoon – Paramilitary police front-line special combat unit
- Marine Operations Force
  - Marine Assault Team (MAST; Malay: Unit Gempur Marin — UNGERIN) – Marine police counter-terrorism unit

Malaysia Coast Guard

- Special Task and Rescue (STAR) – Coast Guard's counter-terrorism unit

Other federal government agencies

- Trup Tindakan Cepat (TTC) – Prison's SWAT team
- Pasukan Taktikal Khas (PASTAK) – Immigration's SWAT team
- Customs Operational Battle Force Response Assault (COBRA) – Customs' SWAT team

== Maldives ==
Maldives Police Service

- Special Weapons and Tactics (SWAT)

== Malta ==
Malta Police Force

- Rapid Intervention Unit (RIU) and Special Intervention Unit (SIU)

== Mexico ==
Guardia Nacional

- Special Reaction and Intervention Force (Fuerza Especial de Reacción e Intervención, FERI)

== Monaco ==
Public Security of Monaco

- Protection, Surveillance and Intervention Group

== Mongolia ==
National Police Agency (Mongolia)

- Special Operations Department
  - Special Operations Unit
  - Special Response Unit
  - SWAT

Internal Troops of Mongolia

- 809th Internal Troops Unit

== Montenegro ==
Police Directorate of Montenegro

- Sector for Combatting Crime
  - Special Operational Support Section
- Special Purpose Police Sector
  - Counterterrorism Unit (PTJ)
  - Special Police Unit (PJP)

== Morocco ==
Royal Gendarmerie

- Groupe d'intervention de la Gendarmerie royale (G.I.G.R)

National Police

- Bureau central des investigations judiciaire (B.C.I.J)

== Myanmar ==
Myanmar Police Force

- Special Weapons and Tactics (S.W.A.T)

== Namibia ==
Namibian Police Force

- Special Reserve Force (SRF)

== Netherlands ==
Nationale Politie (National Police)

- Dienst Speciale Interventies (Special Intervention Service) – Collection of joint, on-call or part-time basis SWAT teams recruiting from police, military police and army (but falling under civilian police command). The Service consists of four Units:
  - Aanhoudings- en Ondersteuningsteams (Arrest and Support Teams) – High-risk arrests, protection of undercover police officers and secret agents and supporting investigation work.
  - Unit Interventie (Intervention Unit) – Small-scale high-risk operations, deployed in situations involving heavy firearms, explosions, hazardous substances and/or suicidal gunmen.
  - Unit Expertise en Operationele Ondersteuning (Expertise and Operational Support Unit) – Specialized teams. Police and army each provide one half of the snipers.
- Dienst Bewaken & Beveiliging (Guard & Security Service) – VIP security, most notably the royal family, politicians and diplomats.
- Mobiele Eenheid (ME) (Mobile Unit) – Part-time non-lethal riot police. When not deployed, officers serve as regular police.

Koninklijke Marechaussee (Royal Military Constabulary)

- Brigade Speciale Beveiligingsopdrachten (Special Protection Tasks Brigade) – Very high-risk arrests, infiltration and VIP security. Unlike the secret agents of the AIVD, its undercover police officers are allowed to carry weapons.
- Bijstandseenheid (Support Unit) – Various SWAT duties and, most notably, serving as heavy riot police and internal security force cleared to use lethal force if necessary to restore public order.

Dienst Justitionele Inrichtingen (Custodial Institutions Agency)

- Intern Bijstand Team (Internal Support Team) – Low-risk prison riot squads and backup teams for regular prison officers, available around the clock at every institution
- Dienst Vervoer en Ondersteuning (Transport and Support Service) – In addition to the offices and training facilities of the Agency, also consists out of:
  - Landelijke Bijzondere Bijstandseenheid (National Special Support Unit) – High-risk prison riot, shakedown and evacuation unit. Also includes canine units and escorts for when prisoners have to go to hospitals.
  - Bijzonder Ondersteunings Team (BOT) (Special Support Team) – High-risk prisoner transport.

== New Zealand ==
New Zealand Police

- Armed Offenders Squad (AOS), Specialist part- time squads from the NZ Police that involve high risk duties and weapons outside the scope of general duties police.
- Special Tactics Group (STG), Specialist full- time counter terrorism unit.

== Nicaragua ==
Policia Nacional-DOEP

- Tácticas y Armas Policiales de Intervención y Rescate (TAPIR)
- Departamento de Intervención Rápida (GIR)

== Nigeria ==
Nigeria Police Force

- Anti-Terrorism Squad (ATS) – counter terrorist unit
- Rapid Response Squad (RRS)
- Criminals Investigation Department (CID)
- Special Anti-Cultism Squad (SACS)
- Anti-Riot Squad
- Nigerian Mobile Police Force
- Anti-Bomb Squad.

State Security Service (Nigeria)

- Department of State Security (DSS), VIP protection/counter terrorist

== Norway ==
Norwegian Police Service

- Delta (Norwegian: Beredskapstroppen)
- Utrykningsenheten (UEH)

== North Macedonia ==
Macedonian Police

- Special Anti-Terrorism Unit – "Tigers" (Специјална Антитерористичка Единица —Тигар)
- Rapid Deployment Unit

== Oman ==
Royal Oman Police

- Special Task Unit

== Papua New Guinea ==
Royal Papua New Guinea Constabulary

- Kumul 23

== Paraguay ==
Paraguayan National Police

- Special Police Operations Forces (FUERZAS DE OPERACIONES POLICIALES ESPECIALES, FOPE)

== Pakistan ==
Federal agencies

- Ministry of Interior — Counter Terrorism Department (CTD)

Provincial agencies

- Punjab Police — Crime Control Department, Dolphin Force & Elite Force
- Sindh Police — Special Security Unit
- Khyber Pakhtunkhwa Police — Special Combat Unit

== Panama ==
- Darien-Kuna Yala Border Security Police (DARKUN)

== Peru ==
National Police of Peru

- Tactical Action Sub-Unit – (Sub-Unidad de Acción Táctica) SUAT
- Sinchis
- GRECCO - Grupo Especial Contra el Crimen Organizado (Special Response Group Against Organized Crime)

== Philippines ==
Philippine National Police

- Special Action Force
- SWAT
- Maritime Group
- AVSEGROUP
- Regional Mobile Force Battalions (RMFB) in each Regional Police Offices.
- District Mobile Force Battalions (DMFB) in each Police District under the National Capital Region Police Office.
- Provincial Mobile Force Companies (PMFC) in each Provincial Police Office.
- City Mobile Force Companies (CMFC) in City Police Offices in Major cities outside Metro Manila.

Department of Justice

- National Bureau of Investigation
  - Special Action Unit (NBI-SAU)

Department of Finance

- Bureau of Customs
  - Enforcement and Security Service (Customs Police)
    - Quick Reaction Team (ESS-QRT)

Department of Transportation

- Philippine Coast Guard
  - Special Operations Force (CGSOF)
- Philippine Ports Authority (Port Police)
  - Special Reaction Team (SRT)
- Manila International Airport Authority
  - Airport Police Department - Light Reaction Section (LRS)

== Poland ==
ABW
SOP
Police

- BOA
- CBŚP
- Samodzielny Pododdział Kontrterrorystyczny Policji (SPKP)

Straż Graniczna (SG)

== Portugal ==
Public Security Police

- Special Police Unit (UEP)
  - Intervention Corps – riot control unit
  - Special Operations Group (GOE) – special tactical assault unit
  - Personal Security Corps – VIP protection unit
  - Center for Explosive Disposal and Subsoil Security (CIESS) – EOD and subsoil security unit
  - Cino-technical Operational Group – K9 unit

National Republican Guard

- Intervention Unit (UI)
  - Special Operations Intervention Group (GIOE) – special tactical assault unit
  - Public Order Intervention Group (GIOP) – riot control unit
  - Protection and Rescue Intervention Group (GIPS) – Rescue and firefighting unit
  - Center for Explosive Disposal and Subsoil Security (CIESS) – EOD and subsoil security unit
  - Cino-technical Intervention Group (GIC) – K9 unit

Prison Guard

- Cino-technical Operational Group – K9 unit
- Intervention and Prison Security Group (GISP) – tactical intervention unit

Maritime Police

- Tactical Actions Group (GAT) – special boarding unit
- Forensic Diving Group – underwater forensic investigation unit

== Romania ==
Ministry of Interior and Administrative Reform

- Special Group for Protection and Intervention (GSPI)

Police

- Detașamentul de Poliție pentru Intervenție Rapidă
  - SAS – the service for special actions
  - SIIAS Serviciul Independent pentru Intervenții și Acțiuni Speciale (Independent Special Actions and Intervention Service)

Romanian Gendarmerie

- BSIJ Special Intervention Brigade "Vlad Țepeș"

Romanian Secret Service (SRI)

- BAT – Anti-Terror Brigade

== Russia ==
Center of Special Operations of the FSB

- Directorate "A" (Spetsgruppa Alpha)
- Directorate "V" (Spetsgruppa Vympel)
- Directorate "S" (Spetsgruppa Smerch)
- Directorate "K" (Kavkaz – formerly Special Purpose unit for the city of Yessentuki)
- Directorate "T" (Spetsgruppa Tavrida) (Crimea, previously – 2nd service "SN" of FSB)
- Special Arms Service

Foreign Intelligence Service

- Special Operations Department of Directorate Z (Zaslon)

Ministry of Internal Affairs

- OSN "Grom" for Counter-Drugs operations (formerly it was subordinated to the defunct Federal Drug Control Service of Russia)

National Guard of Russia

All the special forces of Russian National Guard (Rosgvardia) was operated under Police of Russia and Russian Ministry of Internal Affairs.

- Special Purpose Mobile Unit (O.M.O.N.)(Formerly operated under the ministry of internal affairs)
- Special Rapid Response Units (S.O.B.R.)(Formerly operated under the ministry of internal affairs)

Ministry of Justice

- Dozens of various independent detachments, such as OSN Saturn.

Federal Penitentiary Service OSNs:

- OSN "Fakel"
- OSN "Rossy"
- OSN "Akula"
- OSN "Ajsberg"
- OSN "Gurza"
- OSN "Korsar"
- OSN "Rosomaha"
- OSN "Sokol"
- OSN "Saturn"
- OSN "Taifun" Region St. Petersburg
- OSN "Tornado"
- OSN "Kondor"
- OSN "Yastreb"
- OSN "Berkut"
- OSN "Grif"
- OSN "Titan"
- OSN "Gepard"
- OSN "Shark"
- OSN "Wisent" (European bison)

== Saudi Arabia ==
Presidency of State Security

- Saudi Emergency Force (SEF)
- Saudi Special Security Forces

Ministry of Interior (Saudi Arabia)

- Special Forces for Security and Protection

General Directorate of Public Security

- Special forces of roads security
- Hajj and Umrah special forces
- Diplomatic Security special forces

== Singapore ==
Singapore Police Force

- Emergency Response Team (ERT)
- Special Operations Command (SOC)
- Rapid Deployment Troops
- Police Tactical Unit (PTU)
- Special Tactics and Rescue (STAR)
- Special Guard and Counter-Terrorism Unit (GC)
- Special Action Group (GC)
- Special Tactical Unit (GC)
- In-Situ Reaction Team (ProCom)
- Counter Assault Unit

Singapore Prison Service

- Singapore Prisons Emergency Action Response (SPEAR)

Police Coast Guard

- Special Task Squadron (STS)
- Emergency Response Force

== Slovenia ==
- Specialna Enota Policije (SEP) – the principle counter-terrorist & hostage rescue unit,
- Posebna Policijska Enota (PPE) – the principle public order & peace enforcement unit.

== Senegal ==
Senegal National Police

- National Police Intervention Brigade

Senegalese National Gendarmerie

- National Gendarmerie Intervention Group

== Serbia ==
- Special Anti-Terrorist Unit
- Specialist units of the Gendarmery

== Seychelles ==
Seychelles Police Force

- Public Order and Tactical Response Unit (POTRU)

== Slovakia ==
Slovak Police Force

- Útvar Osobitného Určenia (UOU) Lynx commando – Special Designation Unit of the Presidium of Police, National Police Special Anti-Terrorist Unit
- Pohotovostný policajný útvar (PPÚ – 8 regional police intervention units)
- Mobilná zásahová jednotka ÚHCP (Mobile intervention unit of border and foreign police)
- Zásahová skupina NAKA (National Crime Agency Intervention group)

Finančná správa Slovenskej republiky

- Jednotka služobných zákrokov Kriminálneho úradu finančnej správy (Intervention Unit of the Criminal Office of the Financial Administration)

== Somalia ==
Somali Police Force

- Special Operations Command Battalion (Cheetah Unit)

== South Africa ==
South African Police Service

- Special Task Force (STF)
- National Intervention Unit (NIU) – respond to incidents of medium to high risk.
- Tactical Response Team (TRT) - respond to incidents of medium to high risk.

== Spain ==
Guardia Civil (Spanish gendarmerie)

- Unidad Especial de Intervención (UEI, Special Intervention Unit) – special forces unit for counter-terrorism and hostage rescue among other critical tasks.
- Grupo de Acción Rápida (GAR, Rapid Action Group) – special forces unit formerly focused on counter-terrorism in rural areas, now multipurpose.

National Police Corps of Spain

- Grupo Especial de Operaciones (GEO, Special Operations Group) – special forces unit for counter-terrorism and hostage rescue among other critical tasks.
- Grupos Operativos Especiales de Seguridad (GOES, Special Operative Security Groups) – smaller SWAT-like teams throughout Spain.

Mossos d'Esquadra (Catalonian regional police)

- Grup Especial d'Intervenció (GEI, Special Intervention Group) – Catalonian regional special unit similar to UEI and GEO.

Ertzaintza (Basque regional police)

- Berrozi Berezi Taldea (BBT, Special Intervention Group) – Basque regional special unit similar to UEI and GEO.

Policía Foral (Navarrese regional police)

- Grupo de Intervención Especial (GIE, Special Intervention Group) – Navarrese regional special unit similar to UEI and GEO.

== Sri Lanka ==
Sri Lanka Police Service

- Special Task Force (STF)

== Sweden ==
Swedish Police Authority

- National Task Force (Nationella insatsstyrkan)
- Reinforced Regional Task Force (Förstärkt Regional Insatsstyrka)
  - Reinforced Regional Task Force Stockholm (Förstärk Regional Insatsstyrka Stockholm)
  - Reinforced Regional Task Force South (Förstärkt Regional Insatsstyrka Syd)
  - Reinforced Regional Task Force West (Förstärkt Regional Insatsstyrka Väst)
- Regional Task Force (Regional Insatsstyrka)
  - Regional Task Force East
  - Regional Task Force Bergslagen
  - Regional Task Force Middle
  - Regional Task Force North

== Switzerland ==
Federal Office of Police (FedPol)

- Einsatzgruppe TIGRIS

Cantonal (states) police

- Basel State Police
  - Interventionseinheit Barracuda
- Bern State Police
  - Einsatzgruppe Enzian
- Central Switzerland Police
  - Interventionseinheit Lynx
- Fribourg State Police
  - Groupe d'intervention de la police cantonale fribourgeoise (GRIF)
- Geneva State Police
  - Groupe d'Intervention Police Genève (GIPG)
- Jura State Police
  - Groupe d'intervention et Tireurs d'Elite (GITE)
- Neuchatel State Police
  - GI COUGAR
- Ticino State Police
  - Reparti Speciali-Gruppo d'Intervento (ReS-GI)
- Valais State Police
  - Groupe d'intervention "Edelweiss" (GI Edelweiss)
- Vaud State Police
  - Détachement d'Action Rapide et de Dissuasion (DARD)
- Zürich State Police
  - Einsatzgruppe Diamant
  - Interventionseinheit Skorpion

== Thailand ==
Royal Thai Police

- Border Patrol Police Bureau (BPP)
  - 43th Border Patrol Police Sub-Division
    - Delta Special Operations Team
    - SINGA Special Operations Team
  - 44th Border Patrol Police Sub-Division
    - Long Range Surveillance Unit (LRSU)
  - Aerial Reinforcement Division aka Police Aerial Reinforcement Unit (PARU)
    - Naresuan 261 Special Operation Unit
    - Search and Rescue Company (SAR)
    - Special Forces Company (SFC)
- Central Investigation Bureau
  - Crime Suppression Division (CSD)
    - Hanuman Special Operations Unit
  - Special Service Division (SSD)
    - Counter Terrorism Special Operations Unit
  - Thai Marine Police Division (TMPD)
    - Matchanu Special Operations Unit
- Metropolitan Police Bureau (MPB)
  - Investigation Division Metropolitan Police Bureau (IDMB)
    - Crisis Response Team (CRT)
  - Patrol and Special Operation Division (PSD)
    - Arintaraj 26 Special Operations Unit
- Narcotics Suppression Bureau (NSB)
  - Sayobpairee 43 Special Operations Unit aka NSB Commando
- Provincial Police Region (PPR)
  - Provincial Special Operation Sub-Division (PSO) aka Special Operations Unit (SOU/SWAT)
    - Provincial Police Region 1
      - Prappaireearisatruphay Special Operations Unit
    - Provincial Police Region 2
      - Burapa 491 Special Operations Unit
    - Provincial Police Region 3
      - Kumhang-Songkram Special Operations Unit
    - Provincial Police Region 4
      - Thotsarot 491 Special Operations Unit
    - Provincial Police Region 5
      - Yakkharajh 49 Special Operations Unit
    - Provincial Police Region 6
      - Siharaj 65 Special Operations Unit
    - Provincial Police Region 7
      - Eagle 7 Special Operations Unit
    - Provincial Police Region 8
      - Rajadej Special Operations Unit
      - Sarasin Special Operations Unit
    - Provincial Police Region 9
      - Danthai 54 Special Operations Unit
      - Pali 63 Special Operations Unit (Mobile rapid response SWAT team)
- Special Branch Bureau (SBB)
  - Black Tiger Special Operations Unit

Independent agencies

- Court of Justice (COJ)
  - Office of Security (OOS)
    - Fugitive Unit (FU)

Ministry

- Ministry of Finance (MOF)
  - Customs Department (CD)
    - Special Operations Unit (SOU)
- Ministry of Interior (MOI)
  - Department of Provincial Administration (DOPA)
    - Department of Provincial Administration Special Wisdom and Tactics (DOPA S.W.A.T.)
- Ministry of Justice (MOJ)
  - Department of Corrections (DC)
    - Special Operations Section (SOS)
  - Department of Special Investigation (DSI)
    - DSI Special Weapons and Tactics (DSI SWAT) Teams aka Indiraja 10
  - Office of the Narcotics Control Board (ONCB)
    - Eagle 19 Special Operations Team (Eagle 19 SOT)
- Ministry of Natural Resources and Environment (MNRE)
  - Royal Forest Department (RFD)
    - Naam Peung 62 Special Operations Unit (Naam Peung 62 SOU)
    - Small Ranger Unit (SRU)
- Office of the Prime Minister (OPM)
  - National Intelligence Agency (NIA)
    - Special Operations Unit (SOU)

== Togo ==
National Police

- Rapid Intervention Group of the National Police (GIPN)

Togolese National Gendarmerie

- Special Intervention Unit of the Gendarmerie (USIG)

== Turkey ==
General Directorate of Security

- Police Special Operation Department
- Police Counter Attack Team

Turkish Gendarmerie

- Gendarmerie Special Public Security Command
- Gendarmerie Special Operations

== United Arab Emirates ==
Dubai Police Force

- Police Special Unit

== United Kingdom ==
Firearms unit (with SFO or CTSFO)
National

- British Transport Police Specialist Response Unit
- Ministry of Defence Police Tactical Firearms Unit
- Civil Nuclear Constabulary
  - Dynamic Entry Team
  - Interdiction Team
  - Strategic Escort Group

Territorial police forces

- Avon & Somerset Constabulary Firearms unit and Dog unit
- Cambridgeshire Constabulary Tactical Firearms Unit
- City of London Police Tactical Firearms Group
- Cleveland Police Specialist Operations Unit
- Devon and Cornwall Constabulary Tactical Aid Group
- Dorset Police Tactical Firearms Unit
- Durham Constabulary, Northumbria Police. Specialist Operations Unit
- Greater Manchester Police Tactical Firearms Unit
- Kent Police Training and Tactical Firearms Unit
- Hampshire Constabulary Tactical Firearms Support Unit
- Metropolitan Police Service Specialist Firearms Command and Territorial Support Group
- Norfolk Constabulary Firearms Training & Operations Unit
- North Yorkshire Police Firearms Support Unit
- Police Service of Northern Ireland Headquarters Mobile Support Unit
- Police Scotland Counter Terrorist Specialist Firearms Unit
- South Wales Police, Gwent Police & Dyfed-Powys Police Joint Firearms Unit
- Suffolk Constabulary Tactical Firearms Unit
- Surrey Police Tactical Firearms Unit
- Sussex Police Tactical Firearms Unit
- Staffordshire Police Central Firearms Unit
- Thames Valley Police Tactical Firearms Team
- West Midlands Police Firearms Operations Unit
- Wiltshire Police Armed Response Group

== United States ==
Federal Law Enforcement Agencies

The federal law enforcement agencies in the United States have tactical units.

- U.S. Department of Energy
  - Special Response Team (SRT)
  - National Nuclear Security Administration (NNSA)
    - Special Response Force (SRF)
- U.S. Department of Homeland Security
  - Customs and Border Protection (CBP)
    - Office of Field Operations (OFO)
      - Special Response Team (SRT)
      - Quick Reaction Force (QRF) – CBP National Capital Region
    - U.S. Border Patrol
      - Border Patrol Tactical Unit (BORTAC)
  - Federal Protective Service (FPS)
    - Rapid Protection Force (RPF)
  - Immigration and Customs Enforcement (ICE)
    - Homeland Security Investigations (HSI)
      - Special Response Teams (SRT)
    - Enforcement and Removal Operations (ERO)
      - Special Response Teams (SRT)
  - U.S. Coast Guard
    - Deployable Specialized Forces (DSF)
      - Maritime Security Response Team (MSRT)
      - Maritime Safety and Security Team (MSST)
      - Tactical Law Enforcement Teams (TACLET)
    - Helicopter Interdiction Tactical Squadron (HITRON)
  - U.S. Secret Service
    - Counter Sniper (CS) Team
    - Emergency Response Team (ERT)
    - Counter Assault Team (CAT)
- United States Department of Justice
  - Bureau of Alcohol, Tobacco, Firearms, and Explosives (ATF)
    - Special Response Teams (SRT)
  - Drug Enforcement Administration (DEA)
    - Special Response Team (SRT)
  - Federal Bureau of Investigation (FBI)
    - Critical Incident Response Group (CIRG)
      - Hostage Rescue Team (HRT)
      - Special Weapons and Tactics Teams (SWAT)
      - Tactical Helicopter Unit (THU)
  - Federal Bureau of Prisons
    - Special Operations Response Team (SORT)
  - U.S. Marshals Service (USMS)
    - Special Operations Group (SOG)
    - Special Response Team (SRT)
- U.S. Department of State
  - Bureau of Diplomatic Security
    - Mobile Security Deployments (MSD)
- U.S. Department of the Treasury
  - U.S. Mint Police
    - Special Response Teams (SRT)
- National Park Service
  - United States Park Police
    - Special Weapons and Tactics (SWAT) teams
- U.S. Department of Health and Human Services
  - National Institutes of Health Police
    - Special Response Team (SRT)

Independent Federal Agencies

- Amtrak Police
  - Special Operations Unit (SOU)
- Federal Reserve Police – Special Response Team (SRT)
- National Security Agency Police (NSAP) – Emergency Response Team (ERT)
- Pentagon Force Protection Agency
  - Emergency Response Team (ERT)
- U.S. Capitol Police – Containment Emergency Response Team (CERT)
- National Aeronautics and Space Administration
  - Emergency Response Team (ERT)

State Police/Highway Patrol Agencies

The state police (state troopers) and highway patrols of the United States have tactical units.

- Alabama Police Departments, County Sheriff's Department or Office and DPS (ASPD's, CSODO's, DPS) – Special Emergency Response S.W.A.T Team (SERT)
- Arizona Department of Public Safety – Special Weapons and Tactics (SWAT) Team
- California Highway Patrol – Special Weapons and Tactics (SWAT) Team
- Connecticut State Police – State Police Tactical Unit (SPTU)
- Delaware State Police – Special Operations Response Team (SORT)
- Florida Highway Patrol – Tactical Response Teams (TRT)
- Florida Department of Law Enforcement (FDLE) – Special Operations Teams (SOT)
- Florida Fish and Wildlife Conservation Commission – Special Operations Group (FWCSOG)
- Georgia Counter-Terrorism Task Force (CTTF) (State level multi-agency tactical team)
- Georgia State Patrol – Special Weapons and Tactics (SWAT) Team
- Hawaii Department of Public Safety Sheriff Division – Sheriff's Emergency Response Team (SERT)
- Illinois State Police – Tactical Response Team (TRT)
- Indiana State Police – Emergency Response Team (ERT)
- Kansas Highway Patrol – Special Response Team (SRT)
- Louisiana State Police – Special Weapons and Tactics (SWAT) Team
- Maine State Police – Tactical Team
- Maryland Department of Natural Resources Police – Special Operations Division, Tactical Response Team
- Maryland State Police
  - Special Tactical Assault Team Element (STATE)
  - Tactical Medical Unit (TMU)
- Maryland Transportation Authority Police – Special Response Team (SRT)
- Maryland Transit Administration Police – Visible Intermodal Prevention and Response (VIPR) Teams/Tactical Unit (formerly Special Response Team – SRT)
- Maryland Maritime Tactical Operations Group (MTOG) – Joint federal, state, and local tactical unit specializing in maritime tactical operations
- Massachusetts State Police – Special Tactical Operations Team (STOP)
- Michigan State Police – Emergency Support Team (EST)
- Minnesota State Patrol – Special Response Team (SRT)
- New Hampshire Division of State Police – Special Weapons and Tactics (SWAT) Unit
- New Jersey State Police – Technical Emergency And Mission Specialists (TEAMS)
- New Jersey Transit Police – Emergency Services Unit (ESU)
- New Jersey Transit Police – Conditions Tactical Unit (CTU)
- New Mexico State Police – Tactical Team
- New York State Police – Special Operations Response Teams (SORT)
- North Carolina State Bureau of Investigation (SBI) – Special Response Team (SRT)
- Ohio State Highway Patrol – Special Response Team (SRT)
- Oklahoma Highway Patrol – Tactical Team
- Oregon State Police – Special Weapons and Tactics (SWAT) Team
- Pennsylvania State Police – Special Emergency Response Team (SERT)
- Port Authority Police Department (PAPD) – Emergency Services Unit (ESU)
- Rhode Island State Police – Tactical Team, WMD Tactical Team
- South Carolina State Law Enforcement Division (SLED) – Special Weapons and Tactics (SWAT) Team
- Tennessee Highway Patrol – Special Operations Unit (SOU)
- Texas Department of Public Safety
  - Ranger Division
    - Ranger Recon Teams (RRT)
    - Special Weapons and Tactics (SWAT) Team
- Texas Department of Public Safety – Special Response Teams (SRT)
- Texas Parks and Wildlife Department – SCOUT Team (Tactical Response)
- Utah Highway Patrol – Special Emergency Response Team (SERT)
- Vermont State Police – Tactical Services Unit
- Virginia State Police – Special Weapons and Tactics Teams (SWAT)
- Washington State Patrol – Special Weapons and Tactics (SWAT)

Local Police/County Sheriff Agencies

The police departments and sheriff's offices of thousands of towns, cities, and counties across the United States have tactical units, which are usually called Special Weapons and Tactics (SWAT), Sheriff's Emergency Response Team, (SERT), or Emergency Response Team (ERT). Some examples are below.

- Anchorage Police Department – Special Weapons and Tactics (SWAT) team
- Chicago Police Department – Special Weapons and Tactics (SWAT) Team
- Columbus Indiana Police Department – Special Weapons and Tactics Team (SWAT)
- Denver Police Department – Special Weapons and Tactics (SWAT) Team
- Fairbanks Police Department – Special weapons and tactics (SWAT) team
- Greensboro Police Department – Special Response Team (SRT)
- Hawaii County Police Department – Special Response Team (SRT)
- Honolulu Police Department – Special Weapons and Tactics (SWAT)
- Kauai County Police Department – Special Response Team (SRT)
- Las Vegas Metropolitan Police Department – Special Weapons and Tactics Team
- Los Angeles Police Department – Special Weapons and Tactics (SWAT) Team
- Los Angeles County Sheriff's Department - Special Enforcement Bureau
- Maui County Police Department – Special Response Team (SRT)
- Miami Police Department – Special Threat Response: Special Weapons and Tactics Team (SWAT) and Hostage Negotiators
- Nassau County Police Department – Bureau of Special Operations (BSO), Emergency Service Unit (ESU)
- New York City Police Department – Emergency Service Unit (ESU), Critical Response Command (CRC) and Strategic Response Group (SRG)
- Oakland Police Department – Special Weapons and Tactics (SWAT) Team
- Orange County Sheriff's Department - Special Weapons and Tactics (SWAT) Team
- Portland Police Bureau – Special Emergency Response Team (SERT)
- Raleigh Police Department – Selective Enforcement Unit (SEU)
- San Diego Police Department - Special Weapons and Tactics (SWAT) Team
- San Diego County Sheriff's Office - Special Enforcement Detail
- Tulsa County Sheriff's Office – Special Weapons and Tactics (SWAT) Team
- Putnam County Sheriff's Office - Special Weapons and Tactics (SWAT) Team

== Ukraine ==
National Police of Ukraine

- Rapid Operational Response Unit (KORD) (Ukrainian: КОРД (Корпус Оперативно-Раптової Дії), Corps of Operational-Sudden Action)

== Uruguay ==
Policía Nacional del Uruguay

- Guardia Republicana

== Vanuatu ==
Vanuatu Police Force

- Tactical Response Group (TRG)

== Vatican City ==
Corps of Gendarmerie of Vatican City

- Rapid Intervention Group (Gruppo di Intervento Rapido, GIR, Celeris Interventio Cohors, CIC)

== Venezuela ==
Policía Nacional Bolivariana

- Unidad de Operaciones Tácticas Especiales (UOTE)

== Vietnam ==
Vietnam People's Public Security

- Vietnam Mobile Police (Cảnh sát cơ động) – Counter-terrorist and riot police

Bộ Tư lệnh Cảnh sát Cơ động K20 (K20 Police Headquarters)

- Vietnam Rapid Response Police (Cảnh sát Phản ứng nhanh), also known as CS113 – Counter criminal police
- Vietnam Special Criminal Investigation Police (Cảnh sát Hình sự Đặc nhiệm) – Investigation of special criminal cases

== Yemen ==
Special Security Forces

- Counter-Terrorism Unit (CTU)

== Zambia ==
Zambia Police Service

- Paramilitary Battalion (Special Support Group, SSG3)
- Mobile Unit (Special Support Group, SSG1)

== Zimbabwe ==
Zimbabwe Republic Police (ZRP)

- SWAT
- Police Support Unit

== See also ==
- ATLAS Network
- List of military special forces units
- List of military diving units
