= HRG =

HRG may refer to:

== Science ==
- Hemispherical resonator gyroscope
- Histidine-rich glycoprotein, a plasma protein
- Horizontal ribbon growth, a method of crystal growth
- HRG, a Rockwell scale of materials' hardness
- Human reference genome

== Organizations ==
- HRG Engineering Company, a British car manufacturer
- HRG Group, an American holding company
- Healthcare Resource Group, within the English healthcare system
- Henley Residents Group, an English political party
- Hogg Robinson Group, a defunct corporate travel management company
- Home Retail Group, an English company
- Hostage Response Group of New South Wales, Australia

== People ==
- Branko Hrg (born 1961), Croatian politician
- Noah Bennet (a.k.a. Horn Rimmed Glasses), a character in the TV series Heroes

== Other ==
- Hurghada International Airport, in Egypt
