= Correctional emergency response team =

Team of correction officers

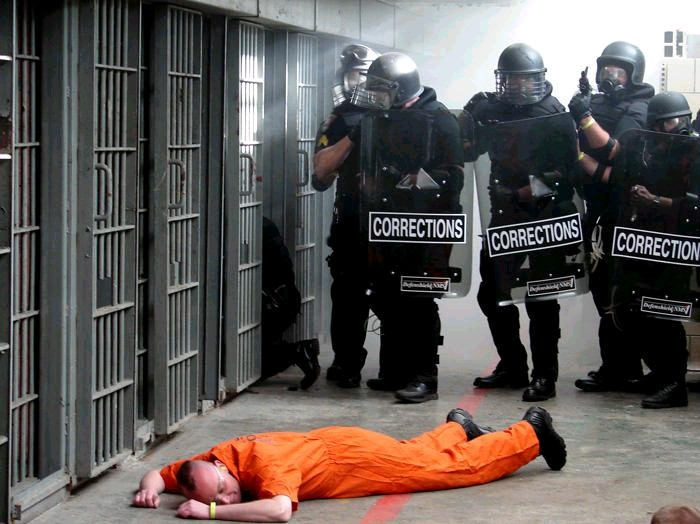
Prison tactical team (riot control)

A correctional emergency response team (abbreviated CERT or CRT) is a team of specially trained prison officers tasked with responding to disturbances, riots, cell extractions, mass searches, and other situations in prisons that are likely to involve uncooperative or violent prisoners.

== Duties ==
Possible duties of a CRT include transport of high risk inmates, extracting uncooperative prisoners from their cells, daily full cell searches and high profile security, barricaded persons, riots, mass arrest, high risk or high profile transport and hostages situations, as well as crowd control.

== Gear ==
CRT officers are outfitted with extensive gear, including body armor, helmets, tactical gloves, handcuffs, leg shackles, and riot shields.

A CRT officer may also be outfitted with a less-than-lethal shotgun, taser, OC spray, or lethal weapons such as firearms.

== Countries ==
=== China ===
==== Hong Kong ====
With a size of around 152 part-time personnel, the special response unit of the Correctional Services Department was set under the organisation of the escort and support group.

The Hong Kong CERT handles emergency and riots with Hong Kong's prison system. Members are equipped with less lethal weaponry such as pepper spray.

Firearms are used as a last resort.

=== France ===
Logo of ÉRIS

The nine Regional Intervention and Security Teams (Équipes régionales d'intervention et de sécurité (ÉRIS)) - one for interregional directorates of penitentiary services in France - were created in 2003 after the successive mutinies in the central prisons of Moulins-Yzeure and Clairvaux. When the teams were created, they comprised 210 personnel; in 2010, the ÉRIS were made up of around 400 people from the French prison administration. (As of 1994, a regional unit made up of agents from various establishments of Marseille).

=== Soviet Union ===
The Internal Troops conducted prisoner security and transport operations, among other paramilitary tasks. Most post-Soviet states have transferred these duties to dedicated prison service teams like Saturn.

=== United States ===
In the United States, CRT organization and training requirements differ from state to state. The Special Operations Response Teams serve under the Federal Bureau of Prisons.

== See also ==
- Initial Reaction Force
