= Nicoletta della Valle =

Swiss jurist

Nicoletta della Valle (born 28 December 1961) is a Swiss jurist. She was the director of the Federal Office of Police (fedpol) from 1 August 2014 until 31 January 2025.

== Life ==
Nicoletta della Valle was born in Bern to an Italian immigrant father and a Swiss mother. Her father taught her boxing, and later she trained in judo. She made it to the brown belt. Between the ages of 40 and 45, she trained kickboxing.

She studied law at the University of Bern. She worked as a forestry police officer at the Federal Office for the Environment and at the Finance Directorate of the City of Bern before moving to the General Secretariat of the Federal Department of Justice and Police. From 2006 to 2011, she was deputy director at fedpol. From 2012 to July 2014, she served as director of the University Psychiatric Services of Bern, before taking over as director of the Federal Office of Police (fedpol) on 1 August 2014.

Nicoletta della Valle is divorced, mother of an adult daughter and lives in Bern.
