= Oberstleutnant =

Rank of officer in the armed forces of German-speaking countries

Oberstleutnant (German pronunciation: [ˈʔoːbɐstlɔʏtnant]) (English: Lieutenant Colonel) is a senior field officer rank in several German-speaking and Scandinavian countries, equivalent to lieutenant colonel. It is currently used by both the ground and air forces of Austria, Germany, Switzerland, Denmark, Finland and Norway. The Swedish rank överstelöjtnant is a direct translation, as is the Finnish rank everstiluutnantti.

== Austria ==
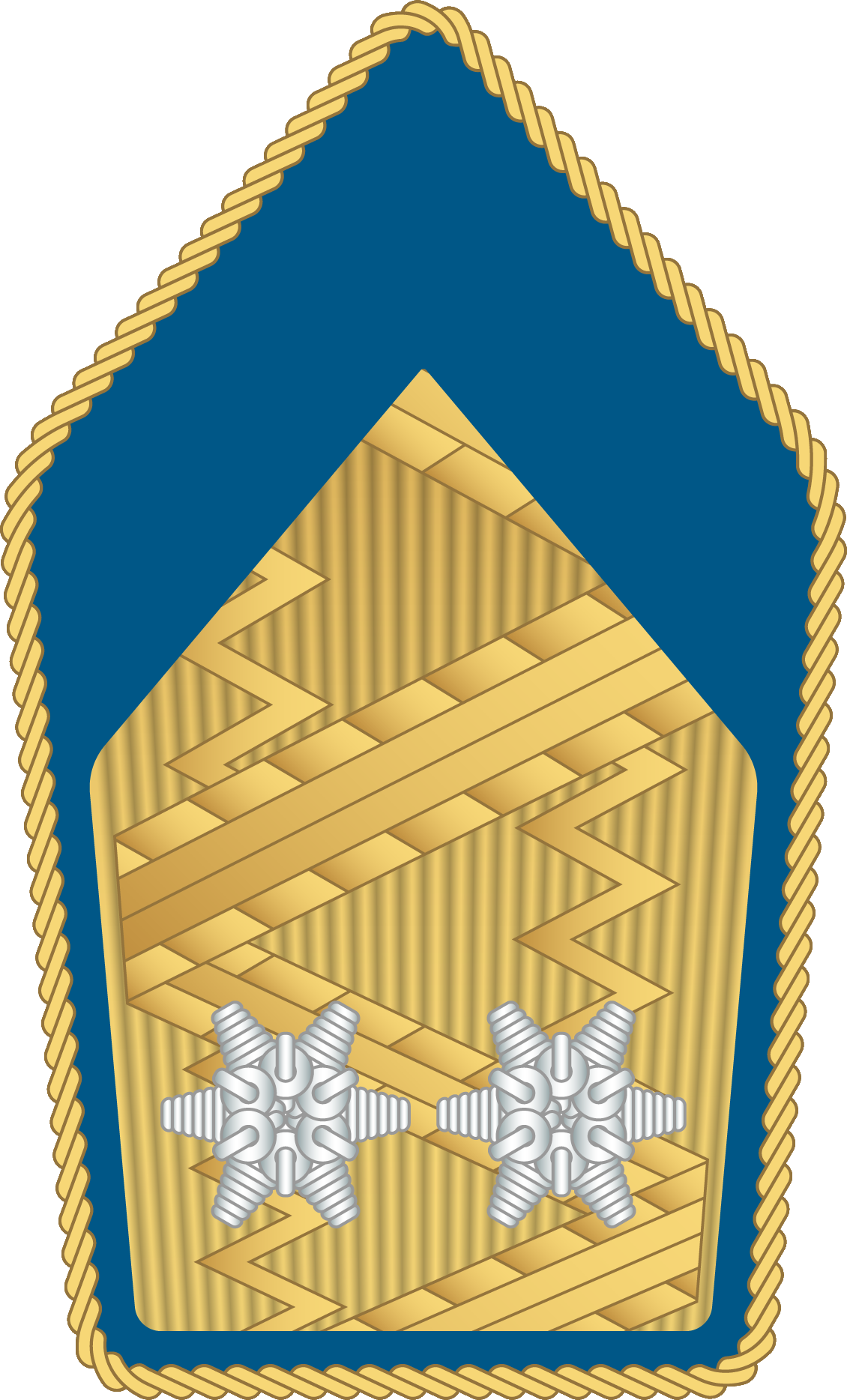
Insignia for Austrian oberstleutnant

The Habsburg Monarchy used the rank obristlieutenant (or oberstleutnant) in the 18th century.

Austria's armed forces, the Bundesheer, uses the rank Oberstleutnant}} as its sixth-highest officer rank. Like in Germany and Switzerland, Oberstleutnants are above Majors and below Obersts. The term also finds usage with the Austrian Bundespolizei (federal police force) and Justizwache (prison guards corps). These two organizations are civilian in nature, but their ranks are nonetheless structured in a military fashion.

== Belgium ==
Rank insignia for Oberstleutnant

Flemish: Luitenant-kolonel
German: Oberstleutnant

== Denmark ==
Oberstløjtnant
- Army and air force insignia
- Country: Denmark
- Service branch: Royal Danish Army; Royal Danish Air Force
- Rank group: Senior officer (Chefniveau)
- NATO rank code: OF-4
- Pay grade: M401
- Next higher rank: Oberst
- Next lower rank: Major
- Equivalent ranks: Kommandørkaptajn

The Danish rank of oberstløjtnant is based around the German term. Ranked OF-4 within NATO and having the paygrade of M401, it is used in the Royal Danish Army and the Royal Danish Air Force. The equivalent rank in the Royal Danish Navy is kommandørkaptajn. An oberstløjtnant is the lowest ranking officer to receive a commission from the reigning Monarch.

On 25 May 1671, the ranks were codified, by King Christian V, with the publication of the Danish order of precedence. Here there were two types of oberstløjtnants. The oberstløjtnant of the Life Guards placed below oberstløjtnants of the infantry and cavalry, and above general-qvarteermester. Standard oberstløjtnants was below general-qvarteermester and above Majors.

As part of the Army Reform of 1867, the ranks of major and oberstløjtnant were removed, making oberst the only senior officer. By 1889, oberstløjtnant was reintroduced.

== Germany ==
Oberstleutnant
- Army and Air Force insignia (Germany)
- Country: Germany
- Service branch: German Army; German Air Force
- Abbreviation: OTL
- NATO rank code: OF-4
- Next higher rank: Oberst
- Next lower rank: Major
- Equivalent ranks: Lieutenant colonel; Fregattenkapitän (German Navy)

Typically, suffixes can be applied to the word Oberstleutnant to specify the individual type of officer. Retired officers that are not incapacitated (i.e. theoretically available for reactivation) from service continue to use their title with the suffix a.D. (Germany) or aD (Switzerland), an abbreviation of außer Dienst, 'out of service'. Suffixes that specify military specialization in active service include Oberstleutnant i.G. (im Generalstabsdienst) for general staff officers or Oberstleutnant d.R. ('der Reserve') for reservists. The suffix i.R. ('im Ruhestand}}), implying retirement without the legal specification of a.D., is unofficial.

=== Bundeswehr ===
The armed forces of West Germany and unified Germany since 1955, the Bundeswehr uses the Oberstleutnant rank in the German Army and German Air Force. Equivalents in the other branches are Fregattenkapitän for the German Navy, Oberfeldarzt for medical staff, Flottillenarzt for naval medical staff, Oberfeldapotheker for apothecary staff, Flottillenapotheker for naval apothecary staff, and Oberfeldveterinär for veterinary medical staff.

Within the German state employee paygrade system, the Oberstleutnant is placed within Besoldungsgruppe A and receives either the A14 or A15 paygrades, depending on individual seniority. Thus, the Oberstleutnant is paid an equivalent wage to that of first-class consuls and legates in the foreign service (A14) or state-employed school directors, ambassadors and general consuls (A15).

The age limit for Oberstleutnant-rank officers is 61.

The Oberstleutnant's shoulder straps in Army and Air Force are marked by two vertically aligned stars above oak leaves.

Army	Luftwaffe
Oberstleutnant i.G. (Gen. staff service) Oberstleutnant (Army reconnaissance) Oberstleutnant d.R. (Mech. infantry reserve)	Oberstleutnant (flecktarn) Oberstleutnant (tropentarn)

=== Bundesgrenzschutz ===
The Federal Border Guard (Bundesgrenzschutz) used the rank Oberstleutnant until 1976, after which it was replaced by the terms Polizeioberrat and Polizeidirektor as part of the government's effort to transform West Germany's federal border guard agency into a less militarized structure.

=== Wehrmacht and Waffen-SS ===
The Wehrmacht (1935–1945) of Nazi Germany used the rank of Oberstleutnant for Army and Air Force, much in the same style the Bundeswehr does. The Waffen-SS (1933–1945) used the rank Obersturmbannführer as an equivalent.

=== Nationale Volksarmee (NVA) ===
The National People's Army (1956–1990) of East Germany used the rank Oberstleutnant (abbr. OSL) for its army and air force, whereas the Volksmarine used the term Fregattenkapitän.

== Norway ==
The rank of Oberstløytnant was introduced around the same time as Denmark, as Norway at the time was part of Denmark–Norway.

Rank insignia for oberstløytnant

Army

Air Force

== Sweden ==
The Swedish variant överstelöjtnant, is a senior field grade military officer rank in the Swedish Army and the Swedish Air Force, immediately below the rank of colonel and just above the rank of major. It is equivalent to the naval rank of Commodore captain in the Swedish Navy.

Rank insignia for överstelöjtnant

Army

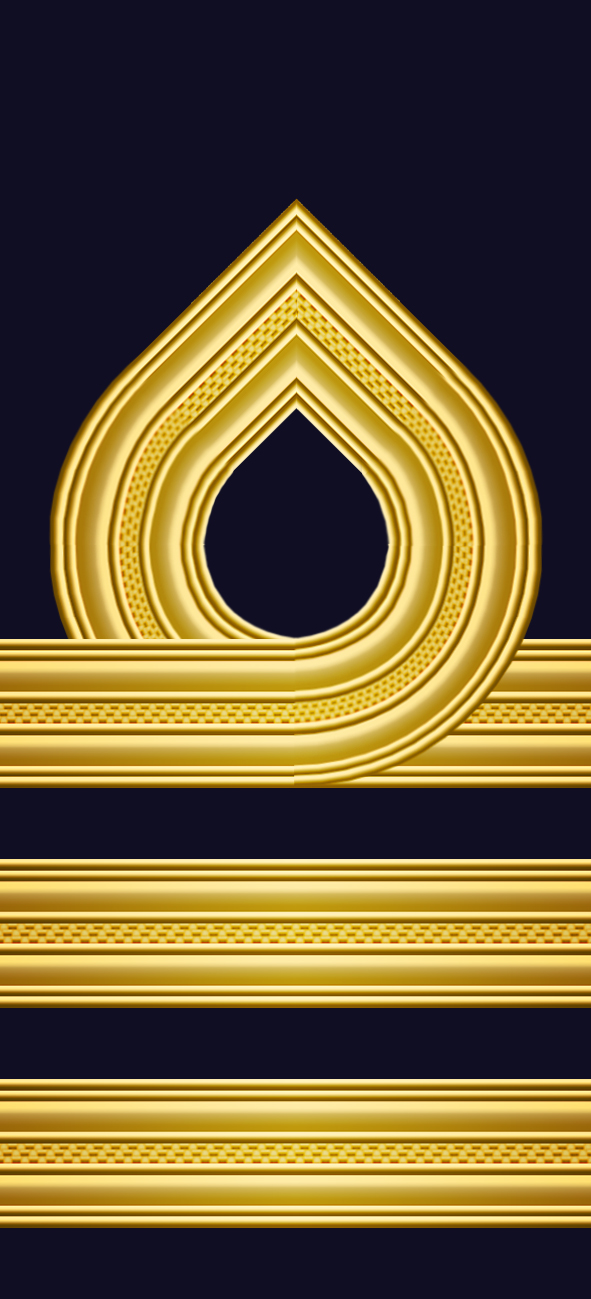
Amphibious Corps

Air Force

== Switzerland ==
Rank insignia for oberstleutnant

Army

=== Swiss Guard ===
Rank insignia for oberstleutnant

Army

== See also ==
- Ranks of the German Bundeswehr
- Rank insignia of the German Bundeswehr
- Comparative military ranks of World War I
- Comparative military ranks of World War II
