= Special Combat Unit =

Pakistani provincial law enforcement agency

- Active: 2015 - present
- Country: Pakistan
- Branch: Khyber Pakhtunkhwa Police
- Type: Special Forces/Light Infantry
- Role: Special Operations Force, Counter-Terrorism, Sting operation
- Size: 150
- Nickname: SCU

Commanders
- Ceremonial commander: Chief Minister of Khyber Pakhtunkhwa

The Special Combat Unit (SCU) is a rapid-deployment counter-terrorism branch of the Khyber Pakhtunkhwa Police with its jurisdiction in Khyber Pakhtunkhwa, Pakistan. Operating across the province, the force handles sting operations, interdictions, counter-terrorism operations, including airborne operations and amphibious operations—both independently and in support of other police units or law enforcement agencies.

The training of the first contingent of 150 personnel begin on 13 May 2014. A contingent of 32 women commandos joined the force on 11 February 2015. By the end of 2015, the unit aims to have 1050 personal deployed in 12 stations across the province.

== See also ==
- List of Special Response Units
- Elite Police Academy
