= Grup Taktikal Khas =

Elite counter-terrorism unit for the Malaysian Immigration Department

- Abbreviation: GTK

Agency overview
- Formed: January 2014
- Dissolved: February, 2018
- Superseding agency: Special Tactical Team
- Employees: About 11 operators

Jurisdictional structure
- Operations jurisdiction: Malaysia
- Primary governing body: Government of Malaysia
- Secondary governing body: Immigration Department of Malaysia

Operational structure
- Overseen by: Ministry of Home Affairs
- Headquarters: Seremban, Negeri Sembilan
- Elected minister responsible: Ahmad Zahid Hamidi

Notables
- Person: Faizal Fazri Bin Othman, first commander

The Grup Taktikal Khas (GTK or Special Tactical Group) was an elite counter-terrorism unit for the Malaysian Immigration Department. However, its role has been taken over by the present Special Tactical Team of the Immigration Department (PASTAK) as of February 2018.

== History ==
The team was formed to raise the capability and ability of the Immigration Department of Malaysia, in conducting high-risk raids and very tough special operation. The unit was officially established in January 2014 as a part of Immigration Department of Malaysia.

The state of Negeri Sembilan became the team's location. The first Commanding Officer of this team is Faizal Fazri Othman, who is also The Immigration Director of Negeri Sembilan State, and the first Operation Leader of the team is Roslan Bin Mat Sahad. The other operators are not revealed to the public.

However, The Special Tactical Group was succeeded by the Special Tactical Team of the Immigration Department, known as PASTAK, on February 13, 2018.

== Operations ==
GTK is deployed in a high-risk, special operation where a 'special capability' is needed, or the task are unable to be executed by a normal operation unit of the department due to the complexity of the operation.

GTK are operational for up to 10 days in any location in Malaysia in any geographical structure.

Thus, the main focus of the team are fighting well-organised syndicates related to the Immigration Act 1959/63, Anti Trafficking in Person and Anti Smuggling of Migrants Act (ATIPSOM 2007), Passport Act 1966, and other transnational/transborder crime syndicates.

== Recruitment and training ==
The Special Tactical Group Assessment and Selection Program consists of two selection modes: the Camp Mode and the Jungle Mode. These two modes had been executed at Labu, Negeri Sembilan and Asahan Camp, Malacca and the best of 9 from 64 candidates were selected to join the first nucleus of the team.

== Equipment ==
=== Weaponry ===
Model	Type	Origin
Heckler & Koch USP Compact	Semi-automatic pistol	Germany
Remington 870	Shotgun	USA

=== Individual gear ===
- SPECTRA helmet
- Body padding protector
- Tactical Goggles
- Level III Kevlar vest
- Rope Operation Equipment (Static Rope (Black), Tactical Carabiner (Black), Fig of Eight (Black), etc.)
- Local map Scale of 1:63360 and other navigation equipment
- Breacher, OxyAcethylene Cutter for Silent Entry / Force Entry
- Personal Multiple Channel Localized Radio
- Government Integrated Radio Network (GIRN) Radio
- Tactical Ladder
- Bushnell Night Vision Gen-II
- Two tactical vehicles

== See also ==
- List of special police units
