= SWAT (Regina) =

Canadian police tactical unit

Special Weapons and Tactics
- Active: 1975–present
- Country: Canada
- Agency: Regina Police Service
- Type: Police tactical unit
- Operations jurisdiction: Regina, Saskatchewan
- Part of: Under Support Services Division
- Headquarters: Regina, Saskatchewan
- Abbreviation: SWAT

Structure
- Officers: 24

Website
- Official website

Special Weapons and Tactics (SWAT) is the police tactical unit (PTU) of the Regina Police Service (RPS), the primary police service for the city of Regina, Saskatchewan, Canada. It is one of the few PTUs in Canadian law enforcement to use the "SWAT" name, which is normally associated with American law enforcement. (Note: Research conducted by Sam Alvaro for a Carleton University thesis found that less than 2 percent of Canadian police departments adopt the SWAT name. The majority of PTUs use names such as Emergency Response Team, Emergency Response Unit, Emergency Task Force, Emergency Services Unit and Groupe d'intervention (English: Intervention Group).)

Established in 1975, the unit has evolved to counter various threats, expand the unit with more officers and better equipment, and assist other police forces based in Saskatchewan in tactical operations. SWAT currently has approximately 24 officers.

== History ==
SWAT was established in 1975, with five two-man teams formed in 1976. The teams were sent to Bozeman, Montana, for training. SWAT became operational by 1979. In the 1980s, the Los Angeles Police Department (LAPD) started to provide training assistance to the RPS, given that the LAPD was the first police department in the U.S. to raise a SWAT unit. According to a former SWAT officer, links between the RPS and the LAPD are so strong that RPS SWAT officers went to Los Angeles to pay respects to Randal David Simmons, who was the first LAPD SWAT officer to be killed in the line of duty. (Note: Randal Simmons was killed in the line of duty in 2008.) On May 31, 1991, Constable Angela MacDougall, a former school resource officer, was the first female officer recruited to the unit. (Note: According to the RPS, Cst. MacDougall was recruited into SWAT in January 1992.) At the time of her recruitment, there were few female officers interested in the SWAT selection process.

In 2005, SWAT was relocated to a building acquired by the RPS, formerly used as a fire dispatch building by the Regina Fire & Protective Services. The RPS hosted a SWAT school session in June 2008, where 68 candidates from Canadian law enforcement agencies went to Regina for training under the LAPD Metropolitan Division. In 2009, Regina-based paramedics worked with SWAT to create the tactical emergency medical services under the then-Regina Qu'Appelle Health Region in order to ensure paramedics can safely conduct medical work on anyone who needs medical assistance, but are under fire.

On December 19, 2013, the RPS and the Royal Canadian Mounted Police (RCMP)'s F Division agreed to have SWAT trained in the RCMP's Tactical Armoured Vehicle (TAV). The agreement was done with the assistance of Bob Gallegos, a law enforcement and ex-LAPD SWAT officer. The RPS announced that all SWAT officers would be required to complete TAV Operator training courses in order to officially use the TAV in situations where cover is needed. On December 12, 2017, the SWAT unit worked with the Crisis Negotiator Team, Saskatchewan Polytechnic, and Shock Trauma Air Rescue Society (STARS) to train in a simulated attack on a post-secondary institute.

On December 20, 2017, the RPS' budget reported a CAD$750,000 expenditure to upgrade aging police equipment, including the potential purchase of a new tactical rescue vehicle (TRV) with enhanced body armour. Then RPS chief Evan Bray justified this due to concerns that borrowing the RCMP's TAV is not always available and the RPS has to pay for costs in gas and maintenance in the face of criticism on police militarization. By January 29, 2018, it is reported that CAD$5 million from the budget of CAD$78 million was set aside to plan for the purchase of a TRV. In July 2018, it was reported that the Terradyne Armored Vehicles Gurkha was purchased. On January 15, 2019, SWAT brought its TRV into service, designated Rescue 1.

In 2020, SWAT assisted the Moose Jaw Police Service (MJPS) by training MJPS Staff Sergeant Taylor Elder and Constable Rodney Zoerb when they travelled to Regina. Both officers were selected in 2019 prior to being sent to Regina. This eventually led to the MJPS creating the Tactical Response Team (TRT). In 2023, RPS Deputy Chief Lorilee Davies announced that the RPS will make SWAT into a full-time unit instead of having it part-time by 2024. She said that this status would allow SWAT to be constantly ready when a situation requires its immediate presence.

On May 19, 2024, the Serious Incident Response Team (SIRT) was called in to investigate the actions of SWAT in an undisclosed incident.

=== Duties and known operations ===
SWAT is tasked to work with other RPS units in resolving a situation, including armed/barricaded suspects, hostage situations, prisoner transport, active shooters and high-risk warrants. The unit is also called in for witness and VIP protection when required.

On February 7, 1979, a sniper opened fire on the city streets less than a block away from the RPS (then known as Regina Police Department) Headquarters building, which took place eight hours after the Communication Centre went operational. SWAT was deployed and apprehended the sniper.

On September 23, 2008, SWAT was called in due to a 911 call made at Luther College High School where an expelled student reportedly made threats to shoot a pastor during mass. The firearm seized during the arrest was a pellet pistol. In April 2009, SWAT was deployed in the aftermath of a shooting incident at 1073 Garnet Street in a case of mistaken identity, which was attributed to the Native Syndicate Killers.

In 2014, Balfour Collegiate was evacuated while SWAT responded to reports that a student flashed a gun in public, which was later confirmed to be an air gun. On May 18, 2019, SWAT was deployed to assist police in Moose Jaw in a manhunt operation with patrol and K-9 officers.

On April 13, 2021, SWAT arrested a 40-year-old man in Regina for allegedly manufacturing firearms in his residence. On August 11, 2022, SWAT worked alongside the RCMP Emergency Response Team in executing search warrants for alleged illegal firearms and drugs.

On September 3, 2025, the SWAT unit assisted RCMP officers to arrest Romana Didulo for firearms possession.

== Organization ==
SWAT had 16 officers in 1996, which grew to 22 officers by 2011. The unit decreased to 20 officers by 2016, then increased to 24 officers by 2018. As of 2024, SWAT includes 24 officers who have full-time duties in other parts of the RPS. They're only called in when firearms are reported to be involved.

SWAT is armed with the Glock 22 pistol, Colt C8 carbine and the Benelli M4 Super 90 shotgun. Tasers and tear gas grenades are used by SWAT as non-lethal weapons. The unit has its armored TRV used for incidents involving firearms. Since January 2021, SWAT has access to drones for conducting reconnaissance.

== Training ==
According to the RPS, SWAT is required to do training days per month with the whole team doing it on day one with sniper and rappelling training on day two. A five-day training block is conducted every three months. All SWAT officers need to qualify every month with their issued weapons while SWAT officers in specialist units must be able to stay qualified on a yearly basis. SWAT officers in counter-sniper duties must be able to fire five rounds into a one-inch circle at 100 yards. The unit does joint training with other PTUs, such as the MJPS's TRT.
