= Sichuan Provincial Prison Administration =

Provincial prison administration authority in Sichuan, China

Agency overview
- Jurisdiction: Sichuan, China
- Headquarters: 1 Binjiang Middle Road, Jinjiang, Chengdu, Sichuan
- Parent agency: Sichuan Provincial Department of Justice
- Website: jyglj.sc.gov.cn

The Sichuan Provincial Prison Administration (Chinese: 四川省监狱管理局; pinyin: Sìchuān Shěng Jiānyù Guǎnlǐ Jú) is a provincial government agency under the Sichuan Provincial Department of Justice. Located in Jinjiang, Chengdu, the agency is responsible for the administration of the provincial prison system of Sichuan, China. It also provides professional guidance to municipal parison administrations in the province.

== Legal responsibilities ==
Under the Prison Law of the People's Republic of China, prisons are state organs responsible for carrying out criminal punishments imposed on offenders sentenced to imprisonment. The national prison system falls within the administrative responsibilities of the Ministry of Justice, while the legality of sentence enforcement and prison activities is subject to supervision by the people's procuratorates.

Within this framework, the Sichuan Provincial Prison Administration implements national laws, regulations and policies concerning prisons and formulates provincial prison policies and development plans. Its officially defined functions include directly administering provincial prisons and guiding municipal prisons, supervising sentence enforcement, prison management, and internal investigations. It also oversees prisoner education, rehabilitation, psychological correction, healthcare, disease prevention, facilities, equipment, and information systems, while supporting post-release and community corrections. In addition, it plans prison construction and modernization, directs prisoner labor and vocational training, ensures occupational safety, and manages the prison enterprise system and its subsidiaries.

The administration is included with the Sichuan Provincial Department of Justice in the provincial government's list of bodies authorized to formulate administrative normative documents.

== History ==
A major reorganization of Sichuan's prison infrastructure began in 2001 with the relocation of Jinjiang Prison. According to a 2016 retrospective published by the Sichuan Legal Daily, many of the province's prisons had historically been located in rural or mountainous areas distant from major population and transportation centers. The restructuring program eventually involved 72 construction projects at 35 prisons, including the construction of 29 new prison facilities. A major phase of the program was completed in December 2013 with the relocation of Chuan'nan Prison.

The restructuring moved many institutions closer to large cities or major transportation corridors and was accompanied by improvements to prison infrastructure. The prison system also sought to withdraw prison enterprises from hazardous and heavily polluting industries and to replace them with forms of prison labor considered more compatible with modern institutional management.

Sichuan also participated in the nationwide reform of China's prison financing and prison-enterprise system. In 2008, the Ministry of Finance reported that Sichuan was implementing reforms based on the principles of full government financial support, separation of prisons from prison-run enterprises, separation of government revenue and expenditure, and standardized prison operations. The reforms provided separate accounting for prison administrative functions and prison enterprises and reduced the dependence of prison operating expenditures on enterprise production income.

== Prison system ==
The Sichuan Provincial Prison Administration directly administers a network of prisons and specialized correctional institutions. Its official directory includes prisons serving different areas of Sichuan, such as Aba Prison, Bazhong Prison, Chuanbei Prison, Chuandong Prison, Chuanxi Prison, Chuanzhong Prison, Dazhou Prison, Ganzi Prison, Guangyuan Prison, Liangshan Prison, Mianyang Prison, Yibin Prison and Zigong Prison.

The system also includes institutions with specialized functions. These include the Sichuan Provincial Women's Prison, Chengdu Women's Prison, Chengdu Prison for Sick Prisoners and the Chengdu Juvenile Offender Reformatory. The administration is responsible for provincial planning of prison locations and capacity, construction and renovation projects, security infrastructure, police equipment and prison information technology.

In addition to the prisons themselves, the administration has responsibilities relating to the province's prison enterprise structure. Officially defined duties include directing the prison enterprise group and its subsidiaries and overseeing prisoner vocational and labor programs.

== Management ==
=== Sentence enforcement and management standards ===
Standardization has been a significant component of prison-management reform in Sichuan. The provincial prison system began developing standardized management practices in the late 2000s. A 2016 retrospective reported that a standardization program introduced in 2007 had by 2010 been extended across 11 areas of prison work.

In 2018, Sichuan incorporated major prison law-enforcement and management procedures into a set of provincial local standards. These standards covered processes relating to the admission and release of prisoners, sentence enforcement, prison administration and other core operations. A 2020 report by Xinhua News Agency stated that the system consisted of 23 standards and 18 operational manuals and that the standardization project passed a national standardization evaluation in 2019.

The standards were subsequently revised. In December 2025, Sichuan issued the provincial standard DB51/T 2440.1-2025, Prison Management Specifications—Standards for Sentence Enforcement, replacing the corresponding 2018 standard. The Sichuan Provincial Prison Administration was one of the organizations responsible for drafting the standard. It covers matters including imprisonment procedures, prisoner complaints and reports, temporary execution of sentences outside prison, sentence commutation, parole, release, disclosure of prison affairs, and supervision and evaluation.

Another provincial standard, DB51/T 2440.2-2025, Prison Management Specifications—Standards for Prison Administration, was issued at the same time and covers institutional organization, routine prison administration and the management of prisoners.

=== Rehabilitation and preparation for release ===
Prisoner rehabilitation is among the administration's statutory administrative responsibilities. The administration develops programs for prisoner education and rehabilitation, provides guidance on psychological intervention and correction, and assists with social-support programs intended to facilitate the transition of prisoners back into the community. It is also responsible for vocational training associated with prisoner labor.

In 2011, following a Ministry of Justice initiative concerning preparation for release, the Sichuan Provincial Department of Justice and the Sichuan Provincial Prison Administration designated Jinjiang Prison as Sichuan's first prison specializing in pre-release preparation. The program included education and training intended to assist prisoners approaching the end of their sentences in adapting to employment, family and community life after release.

=== Oversight of sentence enforcement ===
Sentence enforcement by Sichuan prisons is subject to several forms of review and supervision. Under national law, people's procuratorates exercise legal supervision over prison enforcement activities. Within the provincial system, the administration supervises matters including prison admissions, sentence commutation, parole, temporary execution outside prison and release procedures.

A 2020 Xinhua report described a system of procedural controls in Sichuan under which applications for sentence commutation and parole were reviewed at multiple levels within individual prisons and the provincial administration. It also described coordination with procuratorial, public-security and health authorities in cases involving temporary execution of sentences outside prison, as well as a combination of internal supervision, procuratorial supervision and mechanisms for outside or social supervision.

== See also ==
- Penal system in China
