= Regional Intervention and Security Teams =

Units of French prison administration

- Équipes régionales d'intervention et de sécurité (French)
- Active: 27 February 2003-Present
- Country: France
- Agency: French Prison Administration
- Type: Police tactical unit
- Role: Law Enforcement; Correctional Emergency Response Team

Website
- www.metiers.justice.gouv.fr/surveillant-penitentiaire-12629/le-metier-12630/les-equipes-regionales-dintervention-et-de-securite-27283.html

The Regional Intervention and Security Teams (in French: Équipes régionales d'intervention et de sécurité or ÉRIS) are the intervention units of the French prison administration responsible for intervening in the event of scenarios such as terrorism, aggression, prison escapes, etc. in a prison establishment. They were created on 27 February 2003 in response to incidents that occurred in detention and are attached to each of the nine interregional prison services directorates.

== History ==
The ÉRIS were created in 2003, by the Prefect Didier Lallement, director of the penitentiary administration, after the successive mutinies in prisons in Moulins and Clairvaux. When the teams were created, they comprised 210 personnel; In 2010, the ÉRIS were made up of around 400 people from the French prison administration.
