= Mountain Eagle Commando Unit =

Police tactical unit

- 山鹰突击队 (Chinese)
- Country: China
- Agency: People's Armed Police
- Type: Police tactical unit
- Operations jurisdiction: Xinjiang Autonomous Region

Commanders
- Current commander: Wang Gang

The Mountain Eagle Commando Unit (Chinese: 山鹰突击队) is a police tactical unit of the People's Armed Police based in the Xinjiang Autonomous Region. The unit was publicly shown to the media on 20 August 2019. Its name is derived from its designated operational areas, consisting of mountains and plateaus.

It is the third police tactical unit to be established by the People's Armed Police after the Snow Leopard Commando Unit and the Falcon Unit.

== Mission ==
The Mountain Eagle Commando was revealed under the 2017-2018 People's Armed Police reform and is tasked to deal with anti-irregular military, apprehension of armed and dangerous criminals, counterterrorism and hostage rescue crisis management missions in Xinjiang, executive protection, high-risk tactical law enforcement situations, operating in difficult to access terrain, and tactical special operations. The unit is specially trained in order to conduct operations on horseback to deal with terrain difficult for vehicles.

== Operations ==
According to the People's Liberation Army Daily, the unit has an intense operational history.
