= Histidine-rich glycoprotein =

Glycoprotein

HRG

Identifiers
- Aliases: HRG, HPRG, HRGP, THPH11, histidine rich glycoprotein
- External IDs: OMIM: 142640; MGI: 2146636; GeneCards: HRG

Gene location (Human)
Chr.	Chromosome 3 (human)
Band	3q27.3	Start	186,660,216 bp
Band	3q27.3	End	186,678,234 bp

Gene location (Mouse)
Chr.	Chromosome 16 (mouse)
Band	16 B1|16 13.79 cM	Start	22,769,822 bp
Band	16 B1|16 13.79 cM	End	22,780,406 bp
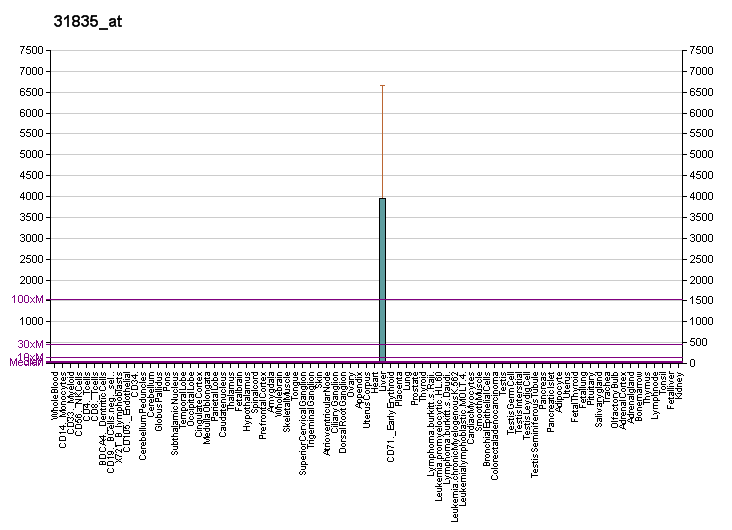

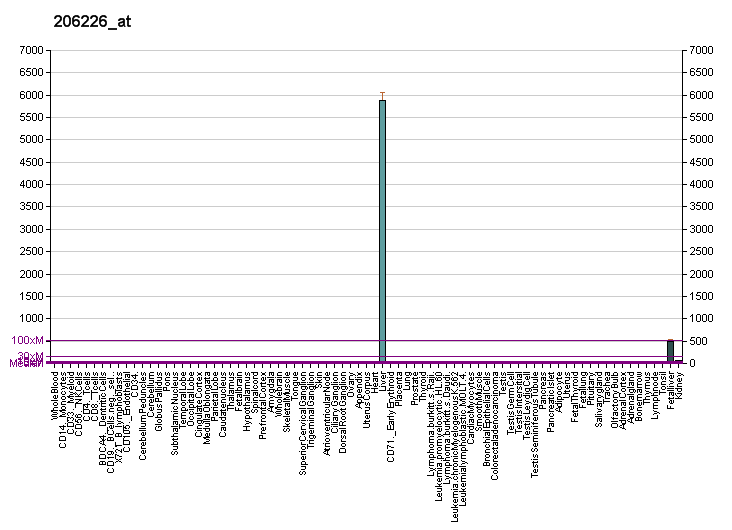
RNA expression pattern
Bgee	Human / Mouse (ortholog); Top expressed in: liver; right lobe of liver; kidney tubule; renal medulla; glomerulus; metanephric glomerulus; oocyte; secondary oocyte; human kidney; testicle / Top expressed in: left lobe of liver; gallbladder; proximal tubule; right kidney; sexually immature organism; embryo; medial head of gastrocnemius muscle; human kidney; thoracic diaphragm; lens; More reference expression data
BioGPS	More reference expression data
Gene ontology
Molecular function	heparin binding; cysteine-type endopeptidase inhibitor activity; zinc ion binding; immunoglobulin binding; metal ion binding; protein binding; heme binding; serine-type endopeptidase inhibitor activity; heparan sulfate proteoglycan binding; signaling receptor binding
Cellular component	endolysosome; blood microparticle; plasma membrane; extracellular region; extracellular exosome; platelet alpha granule lumen; cell surface; collagen-containing extracellular matrix
Biological process	hemostasis; negative regulation of cell adhesion; negative regulation of fibrinolysis; regulation of actin cytoskeleton organization; negative regulation of blood vessel endothelial cell migration; positive regulation of immune response to tumor cell; fibrinolysis; platelet degranulation; heme transport; negative regulation of endothelial cell chemotaxis; chemotaxis; positive regulation of blood vessel remodeling; negative regulation of cell growth; angiogenesis; positive regulation of apoptotic process; regulation of gene expression; negative regulation of angiogenesis; positive regulation of focal adhesion assembly; negative regulation of vascular endothelial growth factor signaling pathway; regulation of platelet activation; regulation of blood coagulation; regulation of protein-containing complex assembly; negative regulation of cell adhesion mediated by integrin; negative regulation of cell population proliferation; negative regulation of lamellipodium assembly; regulation of peptidyl-tyrosine phosphorylation; blood coagulation; platelet activation; negative regulation of endopeptidase activity; antimicrobial humoral immune response mediated by antimicrobial peptide
Sources:Amigo / QuickGO
Orthologs
Databases	NCBI: entry; OMA: entry
Species	Human	Mouse
Entrez	3273	94175
Ensembl	ENSG00000113905	ENSMUSG00000022877
UniProt	P04196	Q9ESB3
RefSeq (mRNA)	NM_000412	NM_053176
RefSeq (protein)	NP_000403	NP_444406
Location (UCSC)	Chr 3: 186.66 – 186.68 Mb	Chr 16: 22.77 – 22.78 Mb
PubMed search
- Wikidata
View/Edit Human	View/Edit Mouse

Histidine-rich glycoprotein (HRG) is a glycoprotein that in humans is encoded by the HRG gene. The HRG protein is produced in the liver, and it could also be synthesized by monocytes, macrophages, and megakaryocytes. It possesses a multi-domain structure, which makes it capable of binding to numerous ligands and modulating various biological processes including immunity, vascularization and coagulation.

== Structure ==
=== Gene ===
The HRG gene lies on location of 3q27 on the chromosome 3, spans approximately 11kb, and consist of 7 exons. Two common isoforms of the HRG gene have been found in humans. These isoforms exist due to a polymorphism occurring in exon 5.

=== Protein ===
HRG is a glycoprotein of 70-75kDa present at a relatively high concentration in the plasma of vertebrates. The primary structure of human HRG is predicted to be a 507 amino acid multidomain polypeptide consisting of two cystatin-like regions at the N-terminus, a histidine-rich region (HRR) flanked by proline-rich regions (PRR), and a C-terminal domain. HRG has an unusually high concentration of histidine and proline residues, each constituting approximately 13% of total amino acids, concentrated within the HRR and PRR. The high concentration of both histidine and proline residues has resulted in HRG also being termed 'histidine–proline-rich glycoprotein' (HPRG). Human HRG is also composed of approximately 14% carbohydrate attached to six predicted N-linked glycosylation sites.

== Function ==
This histidine-rich glycoprotein contains two cystatin-like domains and is located in plasma and platelets. It is known that HRG binds heme, dyes, and divalent metal ions and it is thought to have multiple roles in the human blood, including roles in immunity, angiogenesis and coagulation. It can inhibit rosette formation and interacts with heparin, thrombospondin, and plasminogen. Two of the protein's effects, the inhibition of fibrinolysis and the reduced inhibition of coagulation, indicate a potential prothrombotic effect. HRG is also reported to be involved in clearance of apoptotic phagocytes, immune complexes, cell adhesion, migration and angiogenesis, due to its ability to bind various ligands such as phospholipids, fibrinogen, plasminogen, heparin, heparansulfate, tropomyosin, and heme, as well as the divalent metal ions zinc, copper, mercury, cadmium and nickel. Mutations in this gene lead to thrombophilia due to abnormal histidine-rich glycoprotein levels.

== Clinical significance ==
The implications of HRG in cancer have been described as "multi-faceted". For example, the protein appears to have both pro- and anti-angiogenic effects. In biomarker studies, the protein has been found to have potential prognostic and diagnostic value for cancer. Furthermore, the absence of the protein is associated with thrombophilia. HRG has also been shown to inhibit the M2-like phenotype of tumor-associated macrophages.

In addition, HRG has been discovered to play a role in infection. Some studies have found HRG has the antibacterial activity against Streptococcus pyogenes and a direct interaction between a S. pyogenes virulence factor (sHIP) and the human HRG has been identified.

== Interactions ==
This protein is known to interact with:

- Thrombospondin
- Haem
- Zn^{2+}
- Heparin
- Plasminogen
- IgG
