= Task Force TIGRIS =

Swiss police tactical unit

Einsatzgruppe TIGRIS
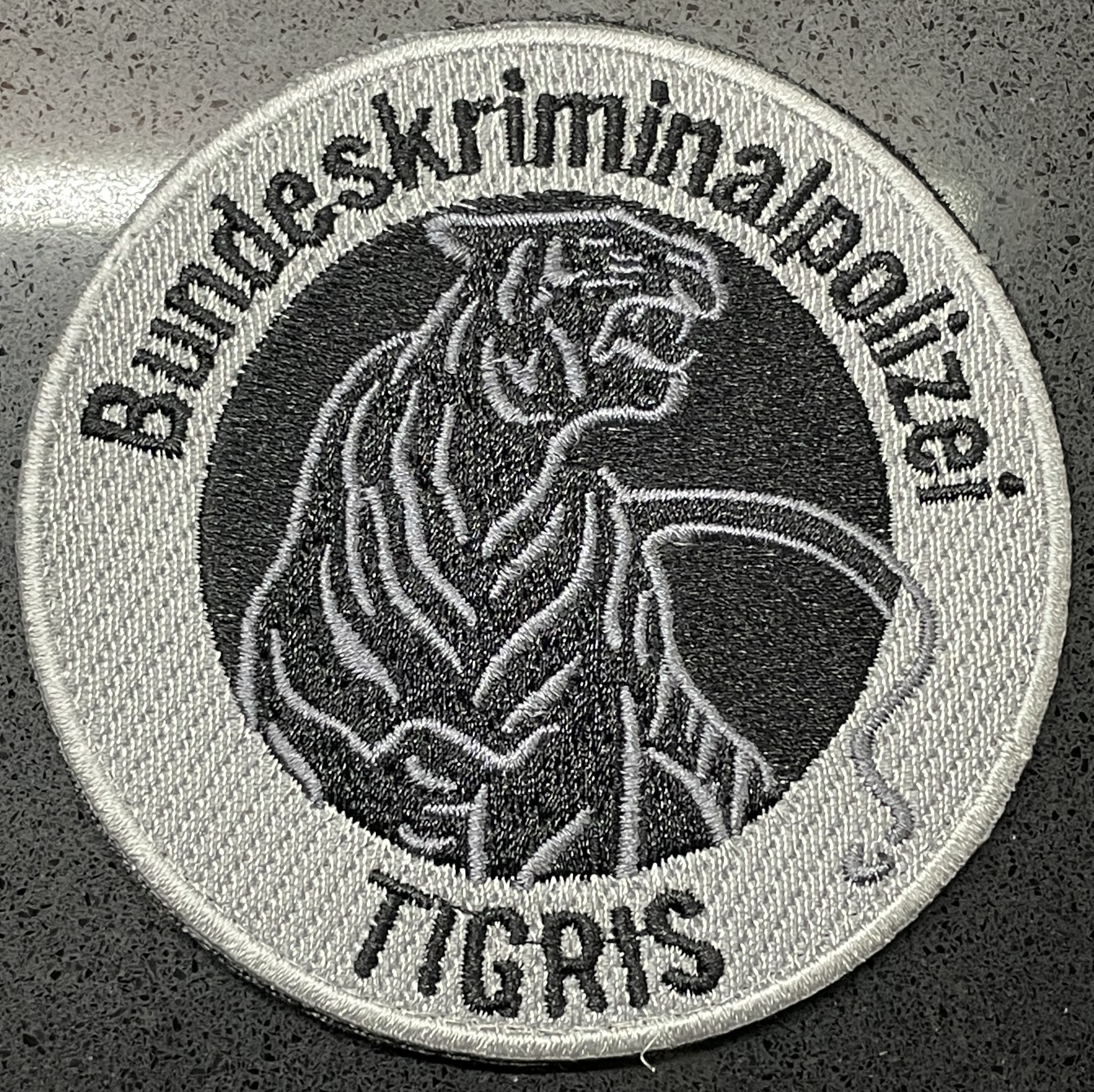
- Einsatzgruppe TIGRIS Patch
- Active: January 1, 2002 (created); 2003 (unofficially formed) - present (existence revealed in September 2005 to Swiss law enforcement, public existence revealed in March 2009)
- Country: Switzerland
- Agency: Federal Criminal Police
- Type: Police tactical unit
- Role: Counter-terrorism; Law enforcement
- Headquarters: Worblaufen

Structure
- Officers: 14

The Einsatzgruppe TIGRIS (English: Task Force TIGRIS, French: Groupe d'intervention TIGRIS, Italian: gruppo d'intervento TIGRIS) is a police tactical unit of the Federal Criminal Police, the investigative arm of the Swiss Federal Office of Police.

== History ==
In the past, plans to create a specialist federal police unit had failed twice — in 1978 and in 2002 — due to jurisdiction issues with the cantons.

After the Swiss Parliament approved the formation of TIGRIS in the year 2000, the unit was covertly created under the watch of ex-Justice Minister Christoph Blocher on January 1, 2002. The unit was created under "Project Effort".

== Duties ==
The unit normally operates as a tactical unit for the needs of the Federal Criminal Police.

For instance, they are tasked with arrests of particularly dangerous individuals, tailing and observation of targets (intelligence gathering), tactical training for the armed personnel of the Federal Criminal Police.

TIGRIS would also intervene in situations where cantonal police agencies would need federal assistance. TIGRIS's missions are based on special operations with high risks and will not intervene in missions where canton police specialist units can handle the job themselves.

A report on TIGRIS was publicly announced, saying that the unit could probably operate in international territory according to its mandate.

== Organisation ==
As of 2009, it consists of 14 officers and is based at the military police base in Worblaufen near Bern.

Manpower for the unit is currently being increased to recruit more officers.

The exact budget allocated to the unit has been made classified by the Federal Office of Police, only being known as part of its allocated budget.

As of 2009, TIGRIS operators had been deployed in 130 operations in Switzerland. No shots had been fired by TIGRIS during these operations.

== Equipment ==
The Weltwoche had reported that the unit has been provided with state-of-the-art counterterrorism equipment and weapons as well as computerised training facilities. Its known budget is a total of 2.7 million Swiss francs.

=== Individual gear ===
Operatives of TIGRIS are known to wear black helmets and combat uniforms.

=== Small arms ===
The operatives of TIGRIS are seen armed with the following firearms:

Model	Origin	Type
Glock 19	Austria	Semi-automatic pistol
Walther P99	Germany	Semi-automatic pistol
Heckler & Koch MP5	Germany	Submachine gun

== Operations ==
Federal officials were first informed about the existence of TIGRIS in September 2005 in a routine meeting of high-ranking police officials, catching most of them by surprise as they were not aware of its creation.

It was not, however, a matter of public knowledge until March 2009, when it was revealed by an article in the Swiss weekly magazine Die Weltwoche.

=== Known instances ===
TIGRIS was deployed in its first mission in May 2003, when they apprehended two foreign nationals, one for the breaking out of a German prison and another for committing fraud.

In June 2006, TIGRIS operatives, assisting Zürich police, arrested a Moldavian national wanted for armed robbery, followed by another arrest operation resulting in the apprehension of a Polish national on December 11, 2006.

On April 3, 2007, TIGRIS units joined with St. Gallen police in arresting a Turkish national for forgery. TIGRIS arrested Gerhard Ulrich, the founder of "Call to the People" on March 27, 2009.

In 2021, Federal Counselor Alain Berset is accused of abusing his power by sending Tigris to the house of his former lover. The Swiss Federal Assembly announced an investigation in the case.

== Criticism ==
Several politicians were angered at the creation of TIGRIS when the unit was officially revealed to the public due to its covert nature.

Markus Notter, Zurich Director of Justice and President of the Police and Justice directors, claimed that Switzerland had too many civilian specialist units serving under various cantons which would not warrant TIGRIS's existence.

Additionally, the police forces in various cantons have responsibility for maintaining security in their own jurisdiction while the Federal Police are supposed to protect Switzerland's territory.

Eveline Widmer-Schlumpf had ordered an investigation into whether the covert creation of TIGRIS was legal and whether the agency is needed for Swiss law enforcement. She concluded that TIGRIS is not needed when she had announced the investigation.

The matter of the unit's existence was raised in the Federal Assembly of Switzerland, questioning its structure and operational methods.

=== Defense ===
In an interview with Blick, Federal Criminal Police commander Kurt Blöchlinger insisted that the feedback from various police cantons was positive regarding TIGRIS's deployment to assist them.

In addition, he said that he had told police officials about TIGRIS's existence in 2005, which contradicted their claims that they never knew about TIGRIS.

TIGRIS' Worblaufen facility is said to be a violation of Swiss law since it was said to be using Swiss military facilities when a reply to the Federal Assembly had insisted that TIGRIS and the military police did not share any building facilities.

== See also ==
- Crime in Switzerland
- Military of Switzerland
- Federal Office of Police
- Law enforcement in Switzerland
