= OSN Saturn =

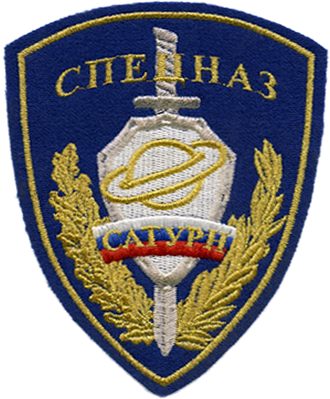
- Active: April 29, 1992
- Country: Russia
- Type: Police tactical unit
- Part of: Federal Penitentiary Service
- Garrison/HQ: Moscow, Russia

Commanders
- Current commander: Boris Nikolaev

OSN Saturn (ОСН Сатурн УФСИН России по г. Москве; Otdel Spetsialnogo Naznacheniya Saturn) is the Moscow department of the Federal Penitentiary Service (FSIN)'s OSN special purpose unit.

== History ==
Saturn was formed in April 1992 as a part of the Moscow Department of Punishment Execution (UIN) under the Ministry of the Interior.

In 2006, the UIN system (including all regional departments and special purpose units) was renamed the Federal Penitentiary Service, and was moved from the jurisdiction of the Ministry of Interior to the Russian Ministry of Justice.

The Saturn unit is also often called "Jail Spetsnaz".

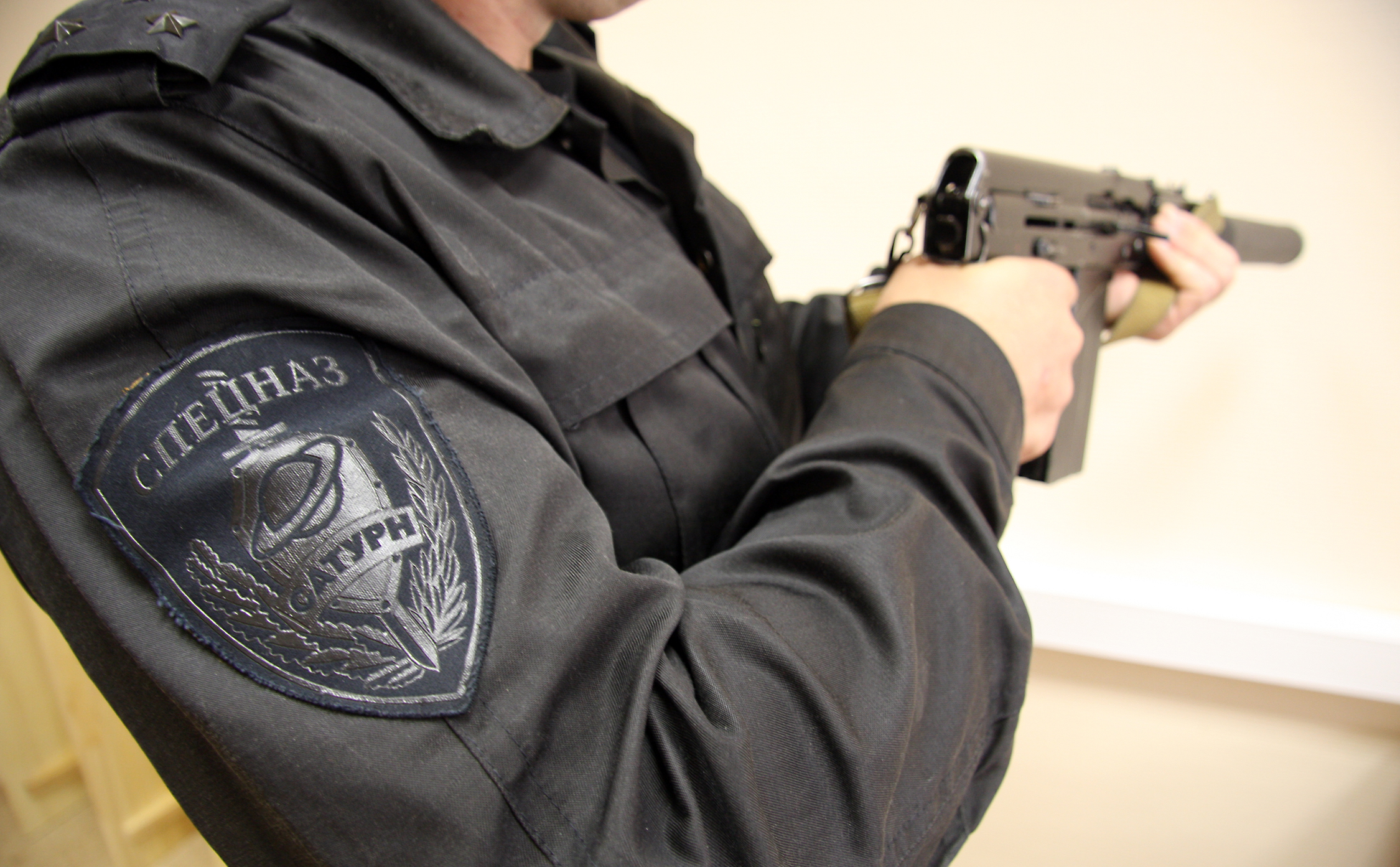
Saturn officer with a silenced 9A-91 carbine assault rifle

== Equipment ==
=== Vehicles ===
- KAMAZ 43269 Vistrel
- Ford E-series armored prisoners van
- Armored Volkswagen T5 Transporter TDI
- KAMAZ-43114
- Toyota Land Cruiser 100
- Nissan Patrol GR (Y60)
- VAZ-2131 Niva
- GAZ-2217 Barguzin passenger van

=== Small arms and Light weapons ===
Model	Origin	Type
Makarov PMM	Soviet Union	Semi-automatic pistol
MP-443 Grach	Russia	Semi-automatic pistol
GSh-18	Russia	Semi-automatic pistol
Glock 17	Austria	Semi-automatic pistol
Glock 19	Austria	Semi-automatic pistol
CZ 75	Czechoslovakia	Semi-automatic pistol
AEK-919K	Soviet Union	Submachine gun
PP-91 KEDR	Russia	Submachine gun
PP-19 Bizon	Russia	Submachine gun
PP-19-01 Vityaz-SN	Russia	Submachine gun
KS-23M Drozd	Soviet Union	Shotgun
AEK-971	Soviet Union	Assault rifle
AN-94	Soviet Union	Assault rifle
9A-91	Russia	Assault rifle
AK-74M	Russia	Assault rifle
AK-103	Russia	Assault rifle
RPK-74	Soviet Union	Light machine gun
SVD	Soviet Union	Sniper rifle
SVU	Russia	Sniper rifle
OSV-96	Russia	Sniper rifle
GP-25	Soviet Union	Grenade launcher
RPG-7	Soviet Union	Grenade launcher
6G-30	Soviet Union	Grenade launcher
AGS-30	Russia	Grenade launcher

== See also ==
- List of special police units
