= Customs Operational Battle Force Response Assault =

Customs Operational Battle Force Response Assault Pasukan Tempur Operasi Medan Jabatan Kastam ڤاسوكن تمڤور اوڤراسي ميدن جابتن كستم
- Abbreviation: COBRA

Agency overview
- Formed: 28 November 2016; 9 years ago
- Employees: 205 operators

Jurisdictional structure
- Federal agency: Malaysia
- Operations jurisdiction: Malaysia
- Governing body: Government of Malaysia
- General nature: Federal law enforcement; Civilian police
- Specialist jurisdictions: Counter terrorism, special weapons operations; protection of internationally protected persons, other very important persons, or state property; Customs, excise, gambling

Operational structure
- Overseen by: Royal Malaysian Customs
- Headquarters: Kuala Lumpur
- Elected officer responsible: YAB Dato’ Sri Anwar Bin Ibrahim, Datuk Seri Haji Ahmad Maslan
- Parent agency: Ministry of Finance

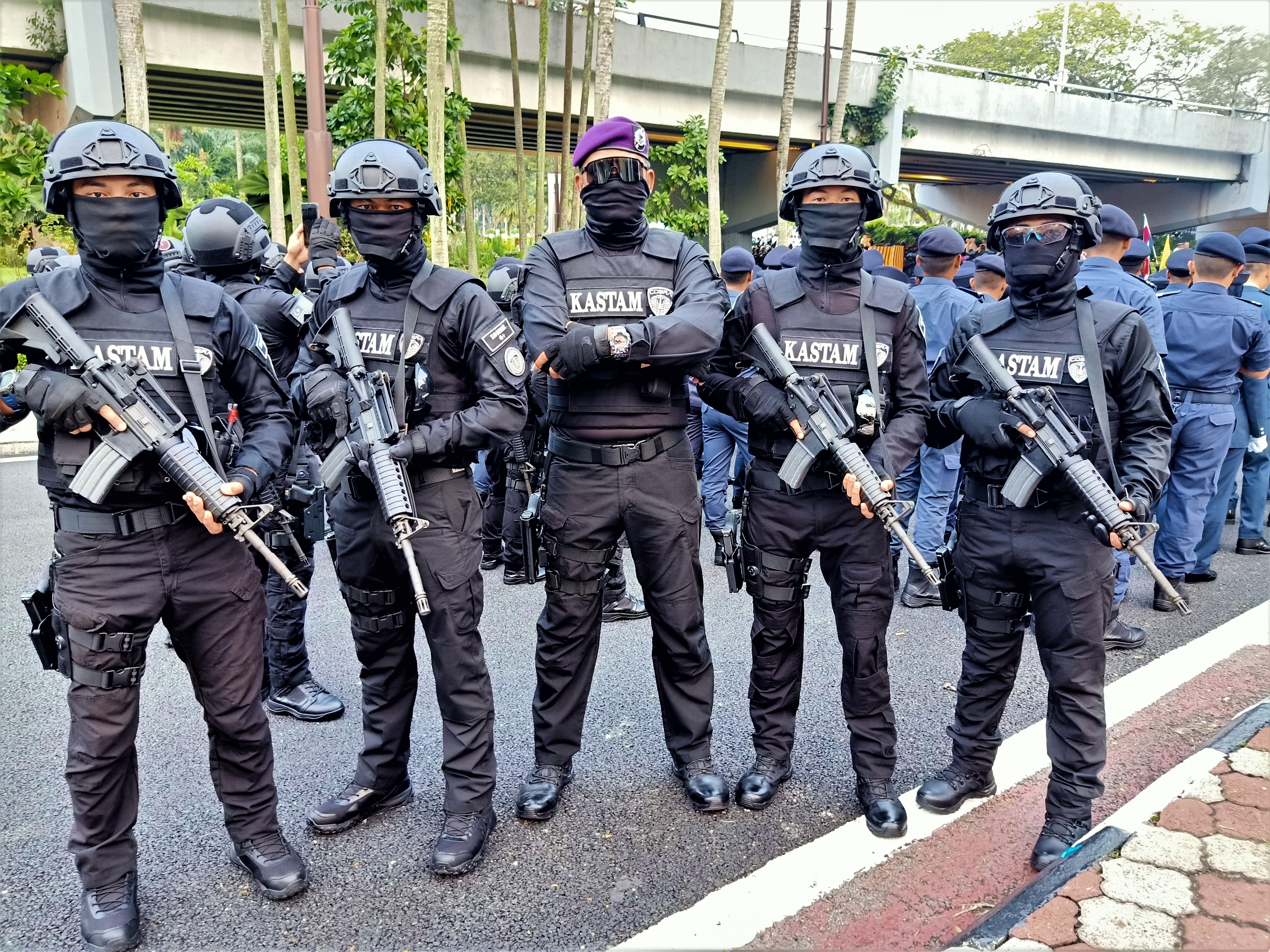
An operatives of the Customs COBRA

Customs Operational Battle Force Response Assault (Malay: Pasukan Tempur Operasi Medan Jabatan Kastam, Jawi:ڤاسوكن تمڤور اوڤراسي ميدن جابتن كستم), commonly abbreviated COBRA, is an elite counter terrorism and armed tactical unit of the Royal Malaysian Customs.

== History ==
As the response of the threats such as intimidation, obstacles, and harassment by touts while on duty, the COBRA team was established to protect the customs raiding team from all kinds of threats and busting a high-profile threats.

Formed on 28 November 2016, a strength of 23 custom officers as the first batch of armed tactical team, underwent training at the General Operations Force Training Centre in Ulu Kinta, Perak in two months, started from 18 July and ended at 16 August.

== Equipment ==
Just like other special ops unit, COBRA team equipped with tactical uniform, equipments and firearms, in addition to moving in a small group depending on the risk level of a case.

In addition to an extensive fleet, COBRA members are armed with the following weapons:

Model	Origin	Type
Glock 34	Austria	Semi-automatic pistol
Heckler & Koch MP5	Germany	Submachine gun
CZ Scorpion Evo 3	Czech Republic	Submachine gun
Benelli M4 Super 90	Italy	Shotgun
Colt M4A1	United States	Assault rifle

To increase the mobility, COBRA utilises the new Isuzu D-Max 3.0 four-wheel drives with upgraded accessories, such as a bull bar and dashboard video camera for use as fast response vehicle and crush down the armed smugglers.

== Operations ==
- 19 December 2017 - Combined KLIA Custom Enforcement Division and the COBRA tactical unit busted an attempt to smuggle 20.4 tonnes of firecrackers and fireworks with raided three stores, located at Batu Arang in Rawang and seized the consignment valued at RM825,714, which included unpaid taxes. Also, the team seized 1,225 litres of liquor from various countries value of RM17,133.60, with unpaid taxes of RM70,697.05.
- 16 Jun 2017 - The Customs seized a various types of drugs worth about RM150,000 after detaining two individuals in Petaling Jaya, Selangor. During the operation on 10 June, the Custom narcotics team with assisted by the COBRA team detained a man and a woman in a condominium.

== See also ==
- Zentrale Unterstützungsgruppe Zoll - German equivalent
- U.S. Customs and Border Protection - US equivalent
