= Security Operations Group =

- Active: 1975–present
- Country: Australia
- Agency: Corrective Services NSW
- Operations jurisdiction: Statewide
- Part of: Security and Intelligence Division
- Motto: "Negotiari Stria Nonvisiblis"

Commanders
- Notable commanders: Ron Woodham

The Security Operations Group (SOG) is a unit of elite corrections officers of Corrective Services NSW, Australia formerly known as the Hostage Response Group (HRG).

== Overview ==
The Security Operations Group is responsible for responding to emergencies such as hostage situations, escapes, riots, barricaded cells and trains other officers to respond to potential security threats.

In 2012-13, the Hostage Response Group was amalgamated with the State Emergency Unit, K9 units and the Tactical Training Unit to form the Security Operations Group. The Security Operations Group has officers responsible for searches to eliminate contraband from prisons from the amalgamation of the State Emergency Unit and K9 units.

In the event of a prison riot, Immediate Action Teams of three or four officers respond and the regional Security Operations Group officers are available together with K9 units for major disturbances and in worst-case scenarios the deployment of all the Security Operations Group.

== Tactical Organisation ==
The Security Operations Group consists of the following:

- command team,
- negotiators,
- intelligence unit,
- tactical response officers

== Tactical Roles ==
- Resolving siege and hostage situations;
- Providing a negotiation service in high risk and critical situations;
- Escorting and securing dangerous prisoners in high risk situations;
- Undertaking searches of cells in high risk situations;
- Armed escort of high risk offenders in custody;
- Specialist surveillance operations.

== See also ==
- Western Australia - Special Operations Group (Department of Corrective Services)
- (Australia) Police Tactical Group
