= Justizwache =

Prison guards corps of Austria

The Justizwache (English: Judicial Guard, literally Justice Watch) is the prison guards corps of Austria. The corps is a department of the Ministry of Justice. Their tasks are the safeguarding of penitentiaries, the safeguarding of inmates, and the security of Courts in Austria. The Justizwache also provides a special unit, the Justizwache Einsatzgruppe (JEG) (German: Judicial Guard Task Force).

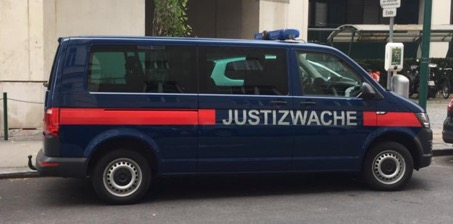
Standard vehicle of the Justizwache

== Organisation ==
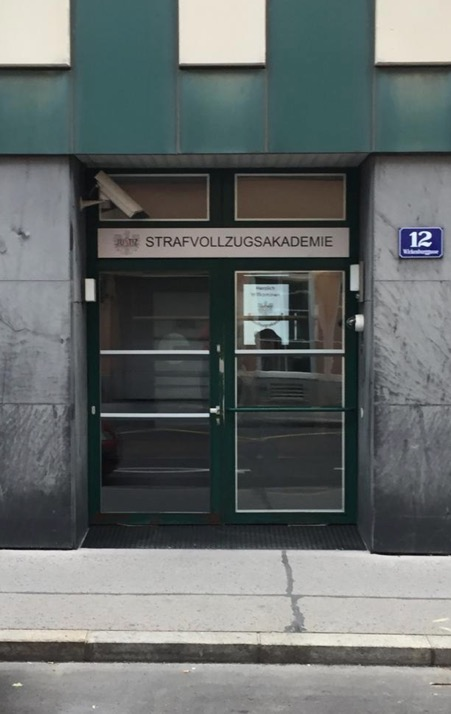
The Strafvollzugsakademie in Vienna

The Justizwache is a uniformed security guard corps, organized in a military manner and provided with executive powers. This is according to § 13a of the Prisons Act. From the point of view of service and remuneration, they are an equivalent unit to the Federal Police. In addition, the educational institution is the Strafvollzugsakademie (German for "penal system academy"), the penitentiary police academy.

=== Special units ===
==== Justizwache Einsatzgruppe – JEG ====
As a special unit, the Justizwache Einsatzgruppe (JEG) has been available to the Justizwache since 1997 for especially dangerous situations. The JEG is not located at any specific prison.

==== Prison Service Extradition Unit ====
Since 2019, the Prison Service Extradition Unit, is the special "transfer unit" of the Justizwache. The Prison Service Extradition Unit transfers foreign inmates from Austria to their home countries to serve their sentences in their home countries. The transport takes place by land with special vehicles.

== Equipment ==
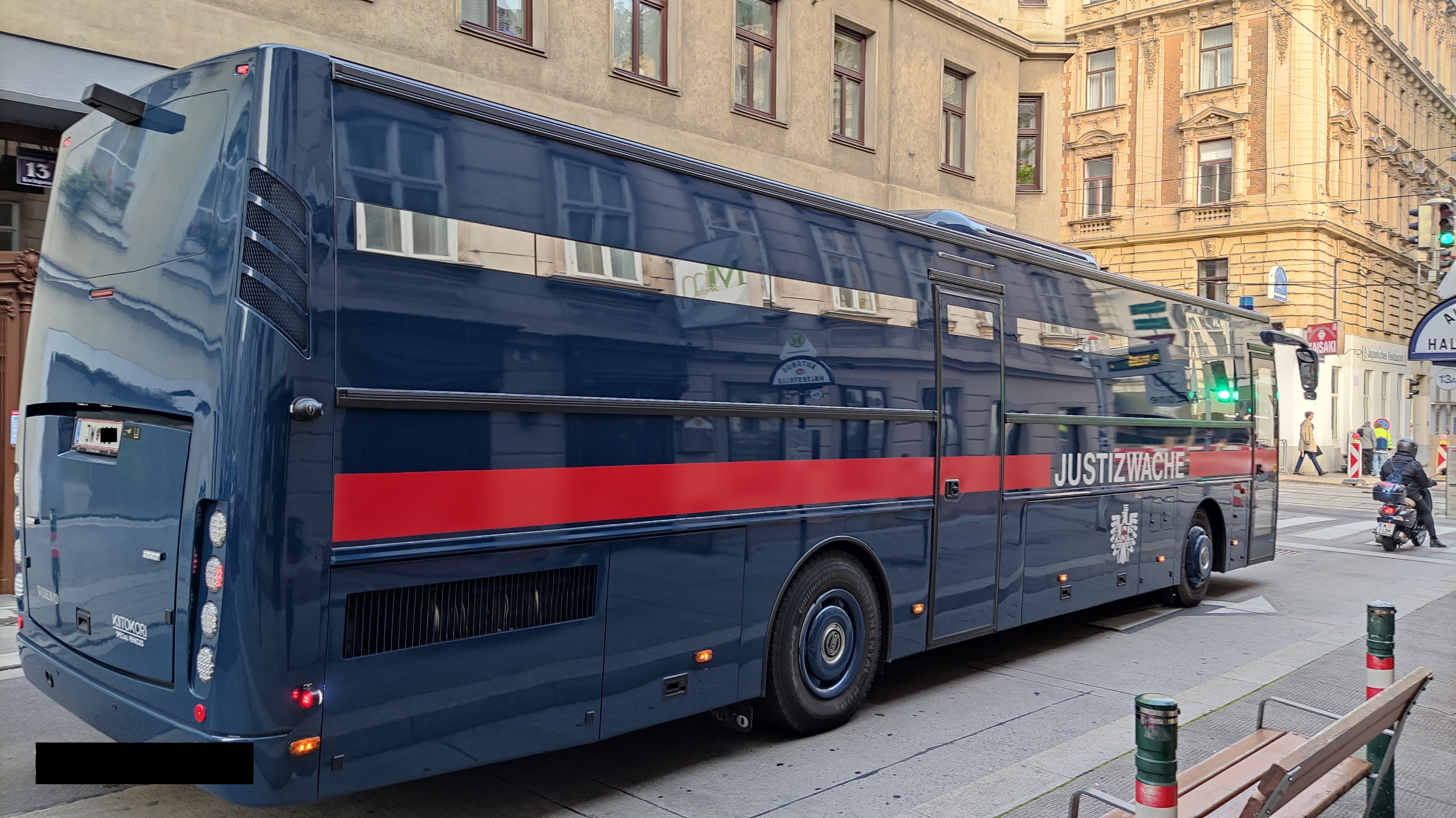
Cell bus of the Justizwache

The general equipment includes a truncheon (and, as a special version, a tonfa baton) and a pepper spray MK-3. During the night service and, if necessary, the officials also carry the service pistol Glock 17. The assault rifle Steyr AUG A3 9 mm, the tear gas gun, the tear gas atomizer and the pepper spray OJ 400a are among the weapons that must be specifically ordered.

In addition, the use of the electric shock gun Taser X26 in the Austrian prisons was temporarily permitted from 10 November 2004 to 20 February 2008, but after massive protests, the Minister of Justice resumed the use of the non-lethal weapon. In June 2009 a new Minister of Justice allowed the use of the electric shock gun under particularly strict conditions again.

The members of the special unit JEG are also equipped with protective shields and helmets in addition to the tonfa baton, in order to be able to take additional protection when necessary.

Vehicles belonging to the Justizwache use the abbreviation JW on their license plates.

== Uniforms ==
Before 2006, the corps insignia of the judicial guard was as follows: within a round border was a binding shield, represented by Austria's colors red-white-red, which was partially covered by a vertical sword. The handle of the sword concealed a chain that showed two links on each side of the handle. A laurel wreath continuing the chain links encircled the binding shield. Both shield, sword and chain symbolized the jurisdictions' existence since time immemorial. A band connected the legal symbols with a laurel wreath, which was based on dignity and honoring all persons involved in the administration of justice.

The Justizwache corps badge shows the Austrian coat of arms, which is surrounded by a circular enclosure. It thus deviates only marginally from the corps badge of the Police, in which the Austrian coat of arms is surrounded by an oak leaf wreath.

Since 2010, the rank insignia of the Justizwache have been the same as those of the Federal Police.
