= Federal Office of Police =

Swiss security agency

- (In German) Bundesamt für Polizei (In French) Office fédéral de la police (In Italian) Ufficio federale di polizia (In Romansh) Uffizi federal da polizia

Agency overview
- Jurisdiction: Federal administration of Switzerland
- Minister responsible: Beat Jans, Federal Councillor
- Agency executives: Eva Wildi-Cortés, Director; Yanis Callandret, Vice Director, Head of Federal Criminal Police (FCP) (Directorate); Marco Erni, Vice Director, Head of Resource Management & Strategy (RMS) (Directorate); Emre Ertan, Vice Director, Head of Police Systems & Identification (PSI) (Directorate); Martin Föhse, Vice Director, Head of Crime Prevention & Law (CPL) (Directorate); Simon Spoerri, Vice Director, Head of International Police Cooperation (IPC) (Directorate); Adrian Brügger, Interim Co-head of Federal Security Service (FSS) (Directorate); Martin Spari, Interim Co-head of Federal Security Service (FSS) (Directorate); Marco Jeker, Member of the Management Board, Co-head of Communications and Staff Office (CSO)
- Parent agency: Federal Department of Justice and Police
- Website: www.fedpol.ch

The Federal Office of Police (Fedpol) (Note: German: Bundesamt für Polizei, French: Office fédéral de la police, Italian: Ufficio federale di polizia, Romansh: Uffizi federal da polizia) of Switzerland is subject to the Federal Department of Justice and Police. It is responsible for the coordination between cantonal police corps and between Swiss and foreign police forces. It also controls the Swiss internal intelligence agency, Dienst für Analyse und Prävention (DAP; Analysis and Prevention Service) prior to being transferred to the Federal Department of Defence, Civil Protection and Sport in 2008. and investigates organised crime, money laundering and terrorism.

Fedpol publishes a yearly report on domestic security. Its investigative arm is the Federal Criminal Police, which operates a small special operations unit—Task Force TIGRIS—whose existence was not made public until 2009.

== Scandals ==
On 3 June 2023, hackers have stolen data from Fedpol servers and published them on the Darknet.

== Organisation ==
Fedpol is structured as of 2023 with the following units:

- Directorate and Staff
- International Police Cooperation Bureau (INTERPOL Bureau)
- Federal Criminal Police
  - Swiss Coordination Unit for Cybercrime Control (CYCO)
  - Task Force TIGRIS
- Services
  - AFIS/DNA Services Division
  - Identity Documents and Special Tasks Division
  - ICT Management and Services Division
  - National Police Information Systems Division
- Federal Security Service
  - Security of Persons Division ― Dignitary Protection and Security of Foreign Missions and Foreign Visitor Protection and Aviation Security.
  - Building Security Division – Property Security Section, Property Protection Section and Management Support Division.
- Resources Group

== Full-time positions since 2001 ==
Raw data

"Federal Finance Administration FFA: State financial statements".
"Federal Finance Administration FFA: Data portal".

== See also ==
- Crime in Switzerland
