= Regina Police Service =

Police branch of Canada

- Regina Police Service badge

- Patch (i.e. shoulder flash) of the Regina Police Service
- Abbreviation: RPS
- Motto: Vigilius Genus (English: A most vigilant breed)

Agency overview
- Formed: 1892
- Preceding agency: Regina Police Department

Jurisdictional structure
- Legal jurisdiction: Regina, Saskatchewan, Canada
- Governing body: Regina Board of Police Commissioners
- Constituting instrument: The Police Act, 1990 The Municipal Police Discipline Regulations, 1991
- General nature: Civilian police

Operational structure
- Headquarters: 717 Saskatchewan Dr.
- Agency executive: Lorilee Davies, Chief of Police

Website
- https://www.reginapolice.ca/

The Regina Police Service (RPS) is the primary police service for the city of Regina, Saskatchewan and holds both municipal and provincial jurisdiction. Formed in 1892, it employs 347 sworn officers and 139 unsworn employees. The current chief of police is Lorilee Davies. Its activities are governed based on The Police Act, 1990 and The Municipal Police Discipline Regulations, 1991.

The RPS has partnerships with the Royal Canadian Mounted Police, Canadian National Railway Police Service and the Canadian Pacific Railway Police Service.

== History ==
The RPS can be traced back to 1892 when the city of Regina appointed James Williams to serve as the first town constable. In 1903, R.J. Harwood was appointed as the first Chief Constable, abolishing the town constable position.

In 1931, the first RPS police station was built in Regina by Harold Dawson in an Art Deco style. The service was originally based in City Hall before they moved to the basement of Alexandra School. In 1953, the RPS Headquarters Building at 1770 Halifax Street (turned to the Municipal Justice Building) was expanded in response to demand for more space. In 1962, Smith & Wesson revolvers were issued to the RPS to replace the Colt and Webley revolvers.

From September 2000, RPS officers were sent to the United Nations Interim Administration Mission in Kosovo as UN police officers.

In July 2012, the RPS adopted a new badge with the motto Vigilius Genus (A Most Vigilant Breed) used to replace the previous Century of Service, which was adopted in 1992.

In December 2015, the Municipal Justice Building was closed off to be demolished and sold.

In December 2017, the RPS considered purchasing an armored tactical vehicle. In January 2018, Regina City Council announced that they were considering a budget proposal with funding for said vehicle.

In June 2023, the news RPS Headquarters was unveiled in a ceremony, located at 1717 Saskatchewan Dr.

In April 2024, the RPS created the Alternate Response Officers (AROS) program for public safety events, enforce bylaws, assist in protecting crime scenes and transport arrested persons, allowing armed officers to be freed up. They are appointed as special constables.

== Organization ==
The following are under the RPS as of 2025:

- Headquarters
- Community Services Division
- Corporate Services Division
- Support Services Division
- Investigative Services Division

=== Oversight ===
The RPS is governed under the Board of Police Commissioners.

== Ranks ==
The following ranks are observed in the RPS:

Chief	Deputy chief	Superintendent	Inspector	Staff sergeant	Sergeant	Corporal	Constable	Special constable
