= List of hostile incidents at the Argentine border =

This is a list of hostile incidents at the Argentine border. This timeline does not include events from the 1982 Falklands War, nor the 1978 peak of the Beagle crisis with Chile. It should be note that Argentina's use of force against Chile and the United Kingdom has been the exception rather than the rule, and some of the hostile acts or armed incidents appear to have been caused by zealous local commanders, and not as the result of a widespread strategy.

Most of the naval incidents involve illegal fishing boats predating squids and fish species outside exploitation seasons and allowed seizing by the Argentine law in Argentine Exclusive Economic Zone waters.

== Incidents ==
26 July 1952
The Argentine National Gendarmerie took control of the disputed areas in Hondo Valley, Horquetas Valley, and Lagunas del Engaño, in the border with Chile, notifying settlers that they had one month to regularize their situation with the Argentine government. This prompted a diplomatic protest from Chile. On August 4, Argentine gendarmes returned to the area.
2 May 1956
Chilean settlers in Valle California, Alto Palena, were notified by Argentine authorities from Esquel that they had to apply for Argentine property titles. The Carabineros de Chile instructed the settlers to disregard the order and notified the commander of the Gendarmerie in Esquel that Carabineros would prevent any actions violating the status quo agreed upon by the two countries.
9 June 1958
The Argentine Navy destroyer ARA San Juan shelled and destroyed a Chilean lighthouse in the unpopulated Snipe islet in the Beagle Channel, during the Snipe incident.
3 November 1958
Argentine gendarmes again entered the Horquetas and Hondo Valley in the Alto Palena–Encuentro River disputed area with Chile.
1965
A group of gendarmes, led by an Argentine second lieutenant, attempted to assault an unarmed Chilean settler, prompting Chilean Foreign Minister Gabriel Valdés to file a formal protest. The Chilean press launched a campaign to cancel President Eduardo Frei Montalva's visit to Argentina, which aimed to advance pending border delimitation tasks between the two countries.

6 November 1965
During a skirmish between border patrols in an area south of O'Higgins/San Martín Lake, Argentine Gendarmerie shot and killed Chilean Carabineros' Lieutenant Hernán Merino Correa in what became known as the Laguna del Desierto incident.
28 September 1966
A group of 18 Argentine nationalist militants hijacked a civilian Aerolineas Argentinas airliner whilst flying over Puerto Santa Cruz and forced the captain at gunpoint to land in the Falkland Islands, where they took several civilians hostage. The crisis was resolved 36 hours later when the hijackers agreed to release their hostages and return to Argentina for trial.
October 1966
Forces of the Tactical Divers Group conducted covert landings in the Falklands from the submarine ARA Santiago del Estero.
29 November 1967
The Chilean torpedo boat PTF-82 was shelled by the ARA Francisco de Gurruchaga from Ushuaia's harbour.
24 June 1968
The Argentine destroyer ARA Santa Cruz found the Soviet trawlers Pavlovo and Golfstrim fishing in Argentine territorial waters. Pavlovo managed to slip away, but Golfstrim was hit by two 40 mm rounds fired by the destroyer and captured. The fishing vessel was escorted to Mar del Plata, where she was released on 9 July after paying a $ 25,000 fine.
4 February 1976
The Argentine destroyer ARA Almirante Storni fired warning shots at the British research ship RRS Shackleton.
3–4 October 1977
The Argentine Navy shelled and captured the Soviet trawler Prokopyevsk and the Bulgarians Ofelia and Aurelia off Puerto Madryn. Three Argentine seamen died from drowning and one Bulgarian sailor was wounded.
19 October 1984
According to the Chilean Ministry of Defense, the Argentine Army fired eight artillery rounds at a Chilean lighthouse at Punta Gusanos, near Puerto Williams.
28 May 1986
The Argentine patrol vessel PNA Prefecto Derbes shelled and sunk the Taiwanese trawler Chian-der 3. Two Taiwanese fishermen were killed; four others were injured.
5 July 1991
The British trawler Pict, which had been part of the British Task Force in the Falklands War as an auxiliary minesweeper, was captured by the patrol boat PNA Azopardo, from the Argentine Naval Prefecture.
1995
According to British reports, the Argentine corvette ARA Granville harassed seven trawlers around Falklands waters and illuminated RFA Diligence with her radar.
5 February 2000
The Argentine corvette ARA Spiro shelled and captured the Taiwanese trawler Hou Chun 101 off San Jorge Gulf.
12 June 2002
The Argentine Naval Prefecture's patrol boat PNA Thompson shelled and damaged the Russian squid trawler Odoyevsk off Puerto Madryn.
11 February 2004
The Argentine corvette ARA Drummond shelled and sunk the Taiwanese trawler Jim Chin Tsai off Comodoro Rivadavia.
15 March 2004
The icebreaker ARA Almirante Irízar entered a maritime area designated as conservation zones under the jurisdiction of the Falkland Islands and issued demands for other ships to identify themselves.
20 February 2006
The British squid trawler John Cheek was seized by the patrol boat PNA Prefecto Fique from the Argentine Naval Prefecture.
14 March 2016
The Argentine patrol vessel PNA Prefecto Derbes shelled and sunk the illegal Chinese fishing trawler Lu Yan Yuan Yu 010 after the ship refused to obey in a 4-hour pursuit and attempted to ram the patrol vessel, all 32 crew members were rescued.
27 September 2023
A riverine patrol boat from Argentine Naval Prefecture intercepted a small vessel escorted by a Paraguayan Navy patrol boat on the Paraná river, off Puerto Maní, Misiones. In the ensuing shootout, a Paraguayan seamen was wounded and two Paraguayan civilians arrested by Argentine authorities under the charge of smuggling fuel. The Paraguayan Navy claims that the patrol boat was assisting a Paraguayan fishing boat in distress.
