= PNA Doctor Manuel Mantilla =

Halcon class patrol vessel

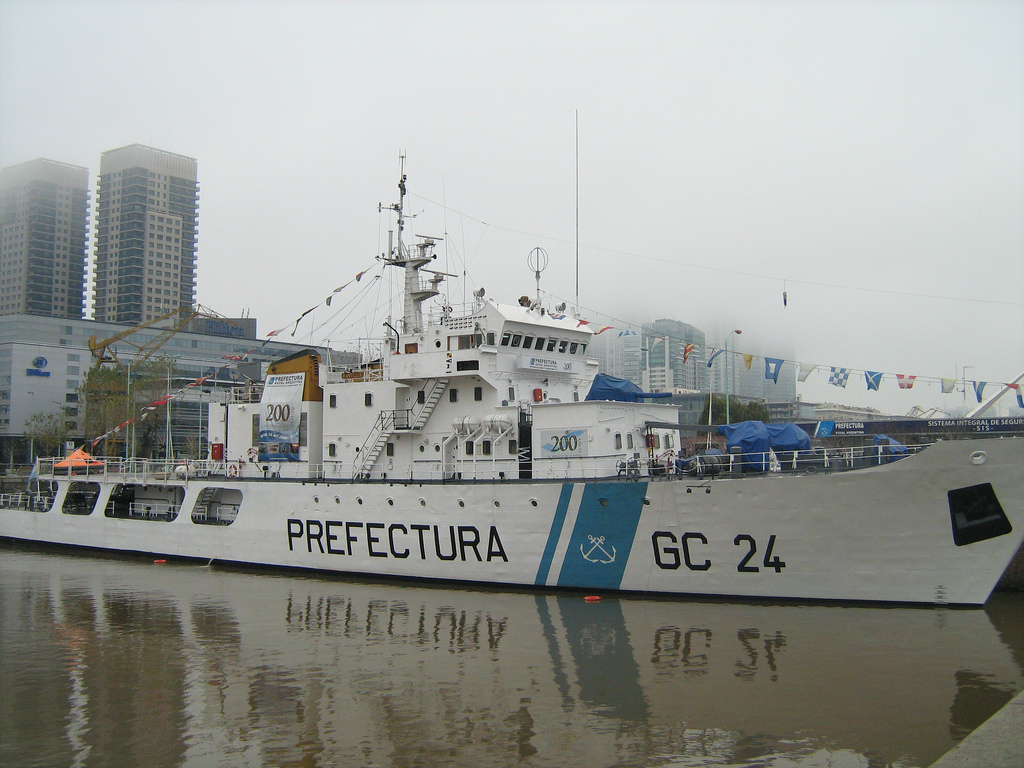

History

(Prefectura Naval Argentina)Argentina
- Name: Doctor Manuel Mantilla
- Namesake: Manuel Florencio Mantilla
- Builder: Empresa Nacional Bazán, Ferrol, Spain
- Laid down: 1981
- Launched: 1981
- Completed: 1983
- Commissioned: 1983
- Home port: Buenos Aires
- Identification: MMSI number: 701523000; Callsign: L2AA
- Status: In service as of 2016

General characteristics
- Class & type: Mantilla-class patrol boat
- Type: Offshore Patrol Boat
- Displacement: 980 tons
- Length: 66.50 m (218.2 ft)
- Beam: 10.6 m (34.8 ft)
- Draft: 3.2 m (10 ft)
- Installed power: 5,000 ihp (3,700 kW)
- Propulsion: 2-shaft, 2 × Bazán-MTU 16V-956 marine diesel engines
- Speed: max 18 knots (21 mph; 33 km/h)
- Range: 3650 nautical miles
- Complement: 38
- Armament: 1 × 40 mm (1.6 in) L/70 Bofors AA gun
- Notes: Career and characteristics data from “Histarmar” website.

PNA Doctor Manuel Mantilla (GC-24) is the lead ship of the Mantilla-class of patrol boats in service with the Argentine Naval Prefecture, (Note: The Argentine Naval Prefecture ((in Spanish) Prefectura Naval Argentina, acronym PNA) is the equivalent of a Coast Guard.) built at the Empresa Nacional Bazán shipyards and commissioned in 1983. The vessel is named after Manuel Florencio Mantilla, an Argentine politician who promoted the first law creating the PNA; she is the first ship of this service with this name.

== Design ==
Doctor Manuel Mantilla is one of five Mantilla-class patrol boats ordered by the Argentine Naval Prefecture (PNA) in 1981, corresponding to the coast guard cutter “Halcon II” type, designed and build by the Spanish Empresa Nacional Bazán shipyard. The design is optimised for long range open seas patrols, for prolonged periods of time away from port.

Mantilla has a steel hull and superstructure, with a single mast atop, behind the bridge. She is powered by two Bazán-MTU 16V-956-TB91 marine diesel engines of 2500kw each (maximum intermittent power 3000kw), driving two Variable-pitch propellers; with a maximum speed of 18kn (19kn at maximum intermittent power). The design has a maximum range of 3650 nautical miles at a cruise speed of 16kn. She has an additional bedroom at the bow to allow her functioning as a training ship.

She has 3 electrical generators of 185Kva each, powering a varied array of systems: controls and communications system that integrates with other PNA air and surface assets; navigation radar; echosound; direction finder; and helicopter navigation control.

Mantilla is equipped with two water cannons for firefighting, anti-contamination gear, active stabilizers and a retractable hangar and landing pad with support facilities for an Alouette-sized helicopter. (Note: The Alouette is classified as a light utility helicopter.) She is armed with a single 40mm L/70 Bofors dual-purpose autocannon in a position at the front of the bridge.

== History ==
Mantilla was ordered by the Argentine Naval Prefecture (PNA) in 1981 as part of the five-ship Mantilla-class, composed by the patrol boats GC-24 to GC-28. She was built in 1981-83 by the Spanish Empresa Nacional Bazán shipyard. She was launched in June 1981, completed in December 1982, and left Ferrol, Spain, arriving in Buenos Aires on 30 March 1983. She was commissioned on 5 April 1983 and assigned to the Coast Guard Service ((in Spanish) Servicio de Buques Guardacostas}).

In June 1983 she sailed on her first patrol of the Argentine Sea, from her base in Buenos Aires.

As of 2016, she is based at Puerto Nuevo, part of the Port of Buenos Aires.

== See also ==
- Z-28 class patrol boat
