= PNA Thompson =

Argentine patrol boat

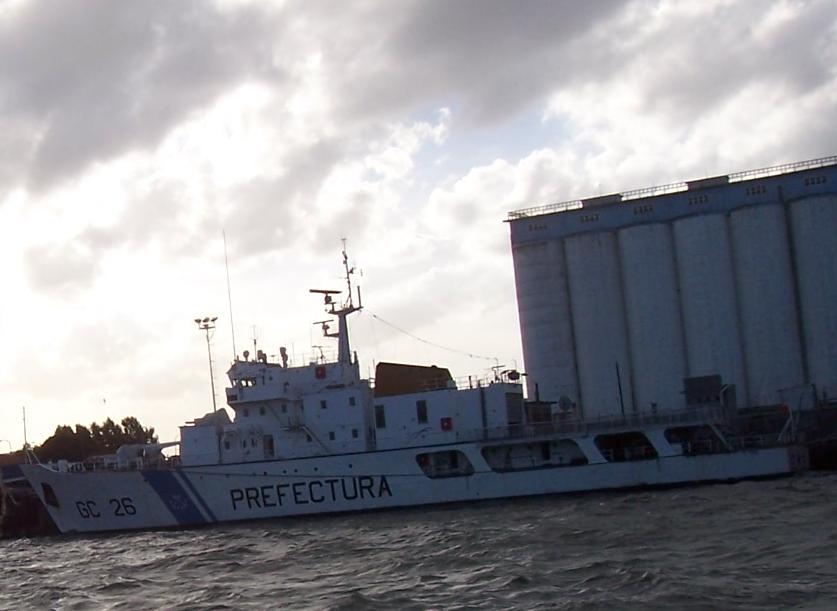

History

(Prefectura Naval Argentina)Argentina
- Name: Thompson
- Namesake: Martín Jacobo Thompson
- Builder: Empresa Nacional Bazán, Ferrol, Spain
- Laid down: 1981
- Launched: 1981
- Completed: 1983
- Commissioned: 1983
- Home port: Buenos Aires
- Identification: MMSI number: 701537000; Callsign: L2AC
- Status: In service as of 2016

General characteristics
- Class & type: Mantilla-class patrol boat
- Type: Offshore Patrol Boat
- Displacement: 900 tons
- Length: 65 m (213.3 ft)
- Beam: 10.5 m (34.4 ft)
- Draft: 3.2 m (10 ft)
- Installed power: 5,000 ihp (3,700 kW)
- Propulsion: 2-shaft, 2 × Bazán-MTU 16V-956 marine diesel engines
- Speed: max 21.5 knots (24.7 mph; 39.8 km/h)
- Range: 5,000 nautical miles
- Complement: 38
- Armament: 1 × 40 mm (1.6 in) L/70 Bofors AA gun
- Notes: Career and characteristics data from “Histarmar” website.

PNA Thompson (GC-26) is a Mantilla-class patrol boat of the Argentine Naval Prefecture, (Note: The Argentine Naval Prefecture ((in Spanish) Prefectura Naval Argentina, acronym PNA) is the equivalent of a Coast Guard.) built at the Empresa Nacional Bazán shipyards and commissioned in 1983. The vessel is named after Martín Jacobo Thompson, an Argentine naval officer during the Independence War, and first Harbourmaster of Buenos Aires; she is the first PNA ship with this name.

== Design ==
Thompson is one of five Mantilla-class patrol boats ordered by the Argentine Naval Prefecture (PNA) in 1981, corresponding to the coast guard cutter “Halcon II” type, designed and build by the Spanish Empresa Nacional Bazán shipyard. The design is optimised for long range open seas patrols, for prolonged periods of time away from port.

Thompson has a steel hull and superstructure, with a single mast atop, behind the bridge. She is powered by two Bazán-MTU 16V-956-TB91 marine diesel engines of 2500 kW each (maximum intermittent power 3000 kW) totalling to 7,500 horsepower, driving two Variable-pitch propellers; with a maximum speed of 21.5kn. The design has a maximum range of 5,000 nautical miles at a cruise speed of 16kn.

She has three electrical generators of 185Kva each, powering a varied array of systems: controls and communications system that integrates with other PNA air and surface assets; navigation radar; echosound; direction finder; and helicopter navigation control. Thompson is equipped with two water cannons for firefighting, anti-contamination gear, active stabilizers and a retractable hangar and landing pad with support facilities for an Alouette-sized helicopter. (Note: The Alouette is classified as a light utility helicopter.) She is armed with a single 40mm L/70 Bofors dual-purpose autocannon in a position at the front of the bridge.

== History ==
Thompson was ordered by the Argentine Naval Prefecture (PNA) in 1980 as part of the five-ship Mantilla-class, designed to fill Argentina's need for a deep water coast guard. composed by the patrol boats GC-24 to GC-28. She was built in 1981-83 by the Spanish Empresa Nacional Bazán shipyard. She was launched in December 1981, completed in June 1983, and left Ferrol, Spain, on 18 August 1983, arriving in Buenos Aires later that month. She was commissioned on 26 August 1983 and assigned to the Coast Guard Service ((in Spanish) Servicio de Buques Guardacostas}).

In 1986 she was assigned to the “Prefectura de Mar del Plata” based in Mar del Plata.

== Service ==
On 14 June 2002, the patrol ship Thompson shot three times without warning at a Russian fishing vessel Odoevsk. Argentines claimed that Russians were fishing squid in the economic zone of this country.

== See also ==
- Z-28 class patrol boat
