= PNA Prefecto Fique =

History

Prefectura Naval Argentina
- Name: Prefecto Fique
- Namesake: Luis Pedro Fique
- Builder: Empresa Nacional Bazán, Ferrol, Spain
- Laid down: 1981
- Launched: 1982
- Completed: 1983
- Commissioned: 1983
- Home port: Caleta Olivia
- Identification: MMSI number: 701536000; Callsign: L2AD; Hull number: GC-27
- Status: In service as of 2016

General characteristics
- Class & type: Mantilla-class patrol vessel
- Displacement: 980 tons
- Length: 66.50 m (218 ft 2 in)
- Beam: 10.6 m (34 ft 9 in)
- Draft: 3.2 m (10 ft 6 in)
- Installed power: 5,000 ihp (3,700 kW)
- Propulsion: 2-shaft, 2 × Bazán-MTU 16V-956 marine diesel engines
- Speed: 18 knots (33 km/h; 21 mph) max
- Range: 3,650 nmi (6,760 km; 4,200 mi)
- Complement: 36
- Armament: 1 × 40 mm (1.6 in) L/70 Bofors AA gun
- Notes: Career and characteristics data from “Histarmar” website.

PNA Prefecto Fique (GC-27) is a Mantilla-class patrol vessel in service with the Argentine Naval Prefecture (PNA), (Note: The Argentine Naval Prefecture in Spanish is (Prefectura Naval Argentina (PNA)), and is the Argentine equivalent of a coast guard.) built at the Empresa Nacional Bazán shipyards and commissioned in 1983. The vessel is named after Luis Pedro Fique, a former commander of the Prefectura de Ushuaia of the PNA; she is the first ship of this service with this name.

== Design ==
Prefecto Fique is one of five Mantilla-class patrol vessels ordered by the Argentine Naval Prefecture (PNA) in 1981, corresponding to the coast guard cutter "Halcon II" type, designed and built by the Spanish Empresa Nacional Bazán shipyard. The design is optimised for long range open seas patrols, for prolonged periods of time away from port.

Prefecto Fique has a steel hull and superstructure, with a single mast atop, behind the bridge. She is powered by two Bazán-MTU 16V-956-TB91 marine diesel engines of 2,500 kilowatts (3,400 hp) each (maximum intermittent power 3,000 kW, 4,000 hp), driving two variable-pitch propellers; with a maximum speed of 18 knots (33 km/h; 21 mph) (19 kn, 35 km/h, 22 mph at maximum intermittent power). The design has a maximum range of 3,650 nautical miles (6,760 km; 4,200 mi) at a cruise speed of 16 knots (30 km/h; 18 mph).

She has three electrical generators of 185Kva each, powering a varied array of systems: controls and communications system that integrates with other PNA air and surface assets; navigation radar; echosound; direction finder; and helicopter navigation control.

Prefecto Fique is equipped with two water cannons for firefighting, anti-contamination gear, active stabilizers and a retractable hangar and landing pad with support facilities for an Alouette-sized helicopter. (Note: The Alouette is classified as a light utility helicopter.) She is armed with a single 40-millimetre (1.6 in) L/70 Bofors dual-purpose autocannon in a position at the front of the bridge.

== History ==
Prefecto Fique was ordered by the PNA in 1981 as part of the five-ship Mantilla class. She was built from 1981 to 1983 by the Spanish Empresa Nacional Bazán shipyard. She was launched in February 1982, completed in 1983, and left Ferrol, Spain, arriving at Buenos Aires on 15 October 1983. She was commissioned on 18 November 1983 and assigned to Coast Guard Service (Servicio de Buques Guardacostas). In November 1983 she sailed on her first patrol of the Argentine Sea. In 1997 is assigned to the port of Caleta Olivia, reporting to Prefectura Comodoro Rivadavia. As of 2016, she is based at Caleta Olivia.

== See also ==
- Z-28-class patrol boat
