= PNA Prefecto Derbes =

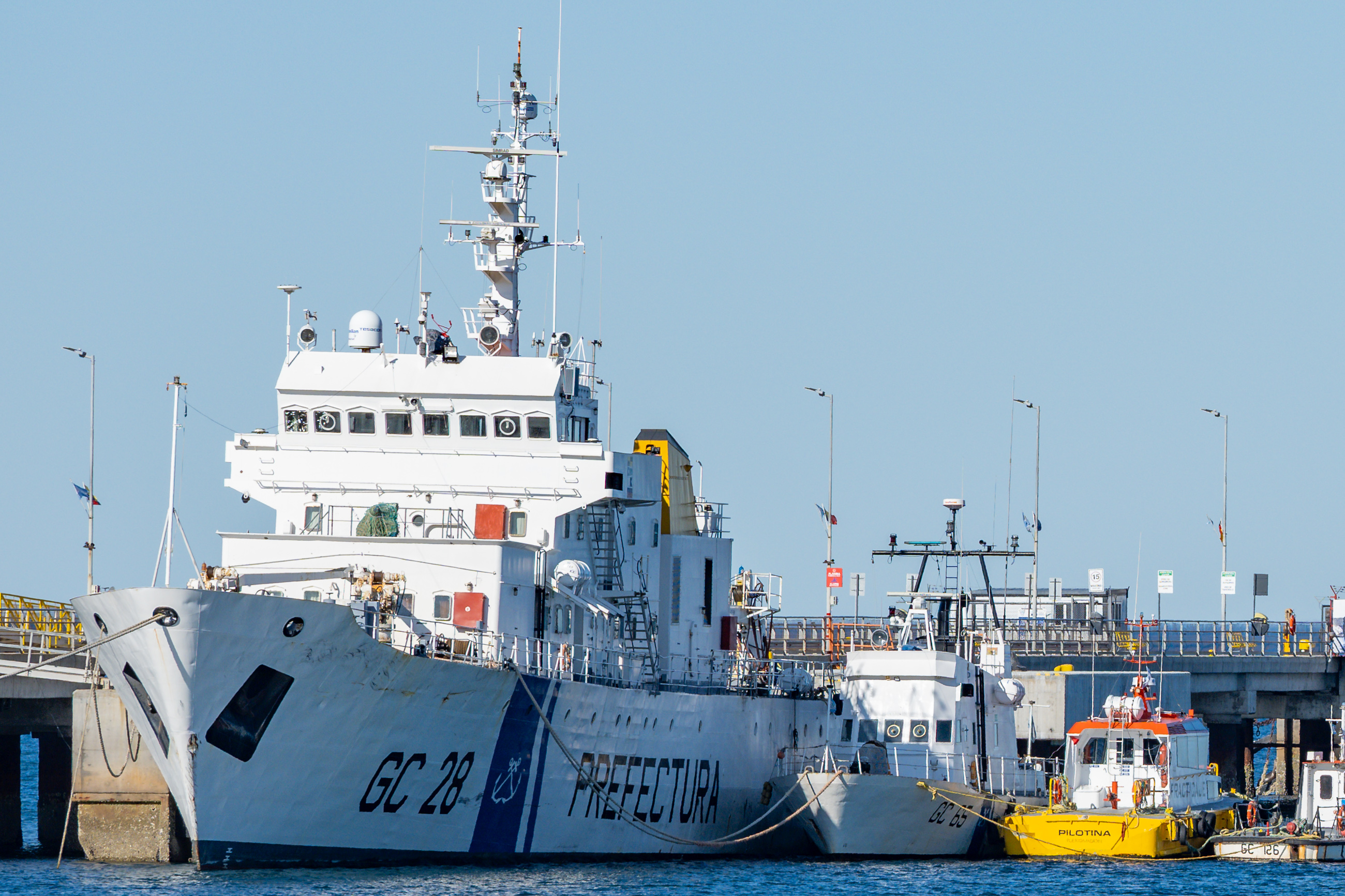

History

Prefectura Naval Argentina
- Name: Prefecto Derbes
- Namesake: Pedro Derbes
- Builder: Empresa Nacional Bazán, Ferrol
- Laid down: 1981
- Launched: 1982
- Completed: 1983
- Commissioned: 1984
- Home port: Puerto Madryn
- Identification: MMSI number: 701535000; Callsign: L2AE; Hull number: GC-28
- Status: In service as of 2016

General characteristics
- Class & type: Mantilla-class patrol vessel
- Displacement: 980 tons
- Length: 66.50 m (218 ft 2 in)
- Beam: 10.6 m (34 ft 9 in)
- Draft: 3.2 m (10 ft 6 in)
- Installed power: 5,000 ihp (3,700 kW)
- Propulsion: 2-shaft, 2 × Bazán-MTU 16V-956 marine diesel engines
- Speed: max 18 knots (33 km/h; 21 mph)
- Range: 3,650 nmi (6,760 km; 4,200 mi)
- Complement: 36
- Armament: 1 × 40 mm (1.6 in) L/70 Bofors AA gun
- Notes: Career and characteristics data from “Histarmar” website.

PNA Prefecto Derbes (GC-28) is a Mantilla-class patrol vessel in service with the Argentine Naval Prefecture, (Note: The Argentine Naval Prefecture ((in Spanish) Prefectura Naval Argentina, acronym PNA) is the equivalent of a Coast Guard.) built at the Empresa Nacional Bazán shipyards and commissioned in 1984. The vessel is named after Pedro Derbes, a former commander of the “Prefectura de Puerto Madryn” of the PNA; she is the first ship of this service with this name.

== Design ==
Prefecto Derbes is one of five Mantilla-class patrol boats ordered by the Argentine Naval Prefecture (PNA) in 1981, corresponding to the coast guard cutter "Halcon II" type, designed and built by the Spanish Empresa Nacional Bazán shipyard. The design is optimised for long range open seas patrols, for prolonged periods of time away from port.

Prefecto Derbes has a steel hull and superstructure, with a single mast atop, behind the bridge. She is powered by two Bazán-MTU 16V-956-TB91 marine diesel engines of 2,500 kilowatts (3,400 hp) each (maximum intermittent power 3,000 kW, 4,000 hp), driving two variable-pitch propellers; with a maximum speed of 18 knots (33 km/h; 21 mph) (19 knots, 35 km/h, 22 mph at maximum intermittent power). The design has a maximum range of 3,650 nautical miles (6,760 km; 4,200 mi) at a cruise speed of 16 knots (30 km/h; 18 mph).

She has three electrical generators of 185 Kva each, powering a varied array of systems: controls and communications system that integrates with other PNA air and surface assets; navigation radar; echosound; direction finder; and helicopter navigation control.

Prefecto Derbes is equipped with two water cannons for firefighting, anti-contamination gear, active stabilizers and a retractable hangar and landing pad with support facilities for an Alouette-sized helicopter. (Note: The Alouette is classified as a light utility helicopter.) She is armed with a single 40-millimetre (1.6 in) L/70 Bofors dual-purpose autocannon in a position at the front of the bridge. She fields a crew of 38 sailors, as do other ships of the Mantilla class.

== History ==
Prefecto Derbes was ordered by the PNA in 1981 as part of the five-ship Mantilla class. She was built from 1981 to 1983 by the Spanish Empresa Nacional Bazán shipyard. She was launched in June 1982, completed and handed over to Argentina in November 1983. The vessel left Ferrol, Spain, on 15 January 1984, arriving at Buenos Aires on 30 January. She was commissioned on 14 March 1984 and assigned to the Coast Guard Service (Servicio de Buques Guardacostas).

In July 1984 she sails on her first patrol of the Argentine Sea. In August 1991 is assigned to the port of Bahía Blanca, reporting to Prefectura de Zona Mar Argentino Norte, replacing her sister ship Azopardo. In August 2000 is visited by the Argentine President, Fernando de la Rúa, while at Puerto Madryn. In February 2009 she was formally assigned to the port of Puerto Madryn to be based there. In December 2012 she was revised and upgraded at TANDANOR shipyard, in Buenos Aires. As of 2016, she is based at Mar del Plata.

== See also ==
- Z-28-class patrol boat
