= Lu Yan Yuan Yu 010 =

Chinese fishing trawler sunk in 2016

History
- Name: Lu Yan Yuan Yu 010
- Owner: Shandong Yantai Marine Fisheries Co., a subsidiary of the China National Fisheries Corporation (CNFC)
- Port of registry: China
- Out of service: 15 March 2016
- Fate: Sunk by Argentine Coast Guard

General characteristics
- Class & type: Fishing trawler
- Length: 66 m (216 ft 6 in)
- Beam: 10 m
- Crew: 32
- Notes: MMSI: 412331038; Call sign: BZSE7

Lu Yan Yuan Yu 010 was a fishing trawler registered in China. The vessel had a length of 66 m (217 ft). It was sunk on 15 March 2016 off the coast of Argentina by the Argentine Coast Guard during a territorial fishing dispute. There were no fatalities.

== Sinking ==
On 14 March 2016, the Argentine Mantilla-class patrol vessel Prefecto Derbes shelled and sunk Lu Yan Yuan Yu 010; all 32 crew members were rescued. According to the Argentine Coast Guard, the vessel was found fishing illegally within the exclusive economic zone (EEZ) of Argentina (42°34.8′S 55°4.7′W) off the coast of Puerto Madryn, a zone known for squid. The Coast Guard reported that it hailed the fishing vessel over radio—in Spanish and English—and both visual and audio signals were sent to make contact. However, the vessel turned off its fishing lights and proceeded to flee towards international waters without responding. Next, the Coast Guard fired "warning shots", but the trawler allegedly made some attempts to ram the Coast Guard ship during the pursuit. Prefecto Derbes opened fire on the trawler, which stopped only before sinking. The Coast Guard rescued four people, including the captain, while the remaining 28 crew were rescued by a nearby Chinese vessel.

== Aftermath ==
According to the Chinese news agency Xinhua, the Chinese embassy in Argentine declared, that while the incident was under investigation, it has asked Chinese fishing companies active in the South Atlantic to exercise caution.

The Argentine foreign minister, Susana Malcorra, said that they hoped the incident would not damage the bilateral relations. According to trade sources, the ship had been involved in disputes over fishing rights before.
