= PNA Azopardo (GC-25) =

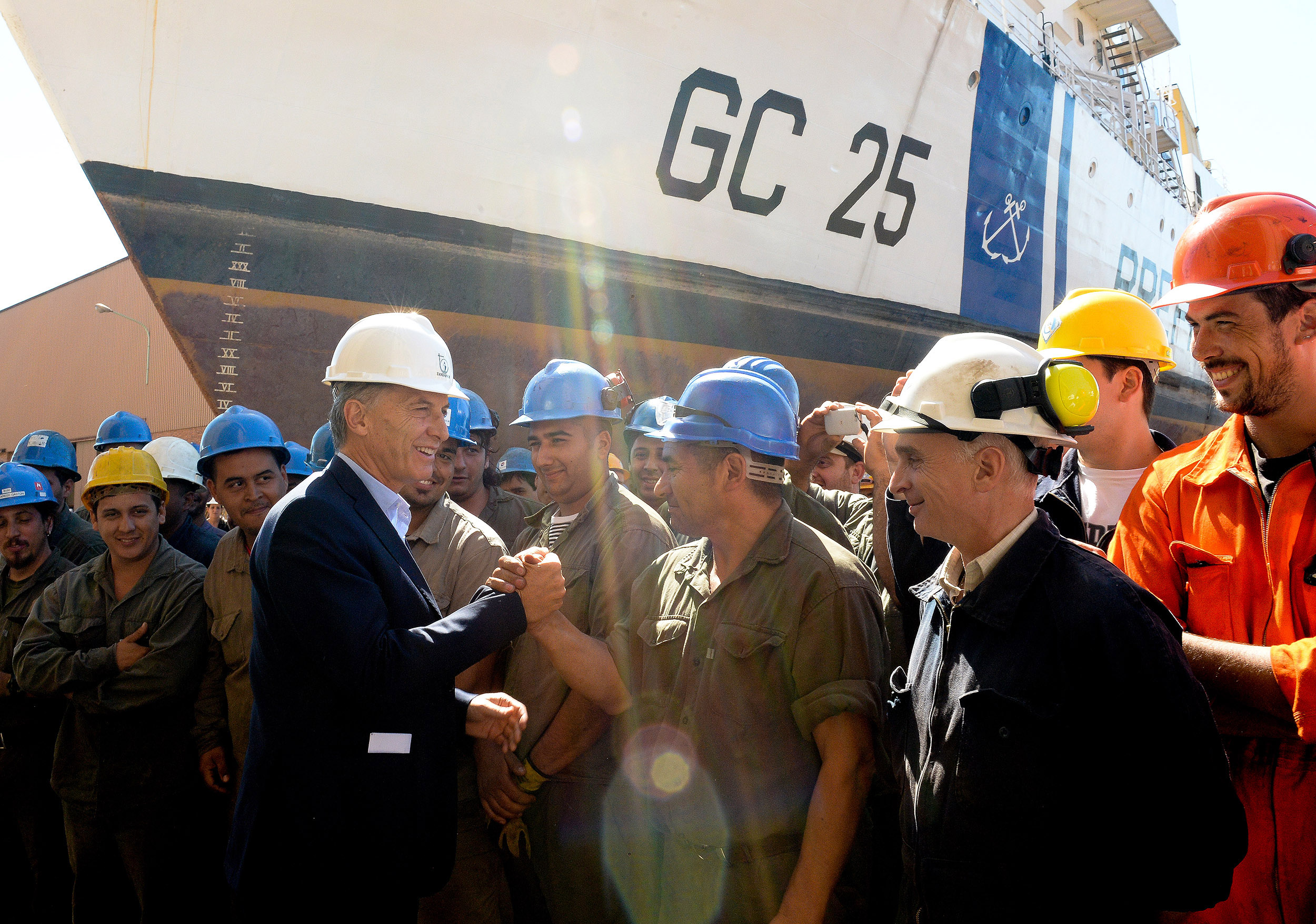
- PNA Azopardo seen during an overhaul.

History

Argentina
- Name: Azopardo
- Namesake: Juan Bautista Azopardo
- Builder: Empresa Nacional Bazán, Ferrol, Spain
- Laid down: 1981
- Launched: 1981
- Completed: 1983
- Commissioned: 1983
- Home port: Buenos Aires
- Identification: MMSI number: 701522000; Callsign: L2AB
- Status: In service as of 2016

General characteristics
- Class & type: Mantilla-class patrol boat
- Type: Offshore Patrol Boat
- Displacement: 980 tons
- Length: 66.50 m (218.2 ft)
- Beam: 10.6 m (34.8 ft)
- Draft: 3.2 m (10 ft)
- Installed power: 5,000 kW (6,700 hp)
- Propulsion: 2-shaft, 2 × Bazán-MTU 16V-956 marine diesel engines
- Speed: max 18 knots (21 mph; 33 km/h)
- Range: 3650 nautical miles
- Complement: 38
- Armament: 1 × 40 mm (1.6 in) L/70 Bofors AA gun
- Notes: Career and characteristics data from “Histarmar” website.

PNA Azopardo (GC-25) is a Mantilla-class patrol boat of the Argentine Naval Prefecture, (Note: The Argentine Naval Prefecture ((in Spanish) Prefectura Naval Argentina, acronym PNA) is the equivalent of a Coast Guard service.) built at the Empresa Nacional Bazán shipyards and commissioned in 1983. The vessel is named after Juan Bautista Azopardo, a Maltese privateer and officer of the Argentine Navy during the Independence and Cisplatine wars, and Harbourmaster of Buenos Aires; she is the second PNA ship with this name. (Note: Not counting the steam transport ARA Azopardo which was used temporarily in coast guard functions before the PNA was officially created.)

== Design ==
Azopardo is one of five Mantilla-class patrol boats ordered by the Argentine Naval Prefecture (PNA) in 1981, corresponding to the coast guard cutter “Halcon II” type, designed and built by the Spanish Empresa Nacional Bazán shipyard. The design is optimised for long range open seas patrols, with prolonged periods of time away from port.

Azopardo has a steel hull and superstructure, with a single mast atop, behind the bridge. She is powered by two Bazán-MTU 16V-956-TB91 marine diesel engines of 2500 kW each (maximum intermittent power 3000 kW), driving two Variable-pitch propellers; with a maximum speed of 18 knots (19 knots at maximum intermittent power). The design has a maximum range of 3650 nautical miles at a cruise speed of 16 knots.

She has 3 electrical generators of 185Kva each, powering a varied array of systems: controls and communications system that integrates with other PNA air and surface assets; navigation radar; echosound; direction finder; and helicopter navigation control. Azopardo is equipped with two water cannons for firefighting, anti-contamination gear, active stabilizers and a retractable hangar and landing par with support facilities for an Alouette-sized helicopter. (Note: The Alouette is classified as a light utility helicopter.) She is armed with a single 40mm L/70 Bofors dual-purpose autocannon in a position at the front of the bridge.

== History ==
Azopardo was ordered by the Argentine Naval Prefecture (PNA) in 1981 as part of the five-ship Mantilla-class, composed by the patrol boats GC-24 to GC-28. She was built in 1981-83 by the Spanish Empresa Nacional Bazán shipyard. She was launched in October 1981, completed in early 1983, and left Ferrol, Spain, on 22 May 1983, arriving in Buenos Aires 15 June that year. She was commissioned on 15 July 1983 and assigned to the Coast Guard Service ((in Spanish) Servicio de Buques Guardacostas) of the PNA.

In 1986 she was assigned to the “Prefectura de Zona del Mar Argentino Norte” based in Bahía Blanca, being relocated to Buenos Aires in 1988. Between March and September 2000 she was overhauled at Río Santiago Shipyard.

As of 2016, she is based at Puerto Nuevo, part of the Port of Buenos Aires.

In 2019, the patrol boat was modernised at Tandanor shipyard. This included updating its sensors, work on water treatment plants, replacing sheet metal and adapting the bathrooms for female staff, among other things.

== See also ==
- Z-28 class patrol boat
