= Mantilla-class patrol vessel =

Class of patrol vessels utilized by the Argentine Coast Guard

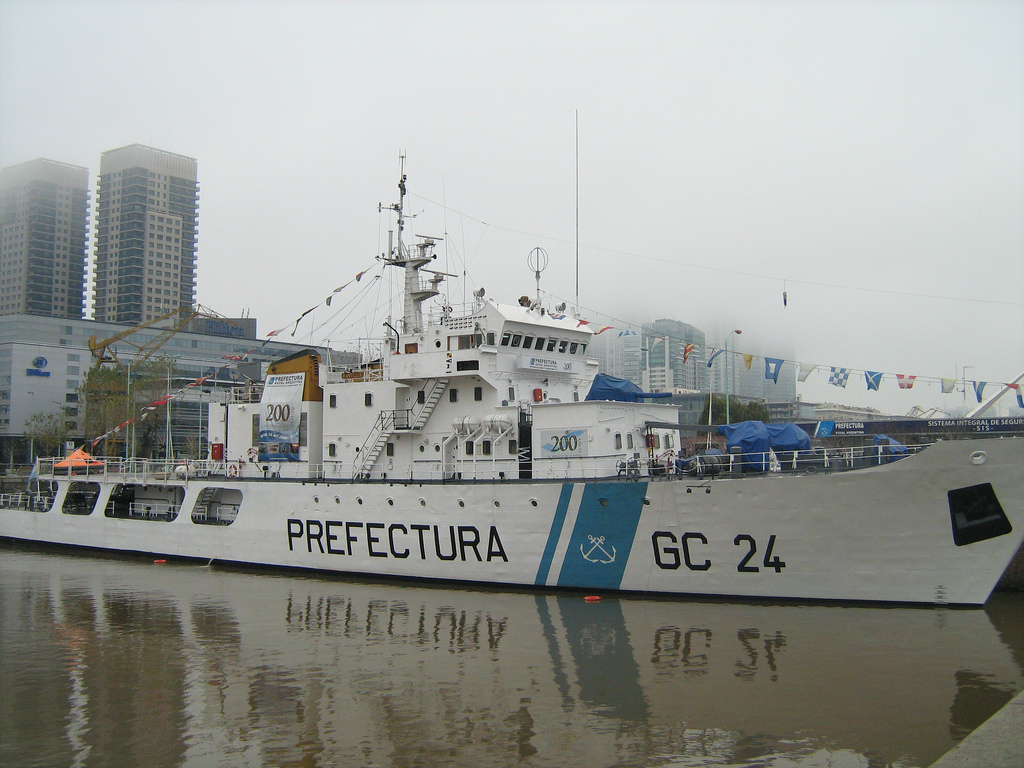
- PNA Doctor Manuel Mantilla

Class overview
- Name: Mantilla (Halcón II)
- Builders: Empresa Nacional Bazán
- Operators: Prefectura Naval Argentina
- Built: 5
- In service: 5
- Active: 5

General characteristics
- Type: Offshore patrol vessel
- Displacement: 1,084 tons (normal load)
- Length: 67.0 m (219 ft 10 in)
- Beam: 10.5 m (34 ft 5 in)
- Height: 5.9 m (19 ft 4 in)
- Draught: 3.25 m (10 ft 8 in)
- Propulsion: 2 Diesel electric drive MTU 16V. 956 9,000 hp (6,700 kW)
- Speed: 21.5 knots (39.8 km/h; 24.7 mph) (maximum)
- Range: 5,000 nmi (9,300 km; 5,800 mi) at 18 knots (33 km/h; 21 mph).
- Troops: 0
- Crew: 38
- Armament: 1 × 40 mm L70 Bofors DP; 2 × 12.7 mm machine gun
- Aircraft carried: 1 AS.365 Dauphin; or 1 AS.350 Écureuil helicopters
- Aviation facilities: One helicopter hangar and helipad

Mantilla-class patrol vessels are offshore patrol vessels in use by the Argentine Coast Guard since 1983.

== Description ==
The class was developed by the Spanish company Empresa Nacional Bazán in 1982.

It is a multi-role patrol craft with twin funnels and a helicopter deck. These ships have main armament (40 mm L70 DP gun) at B position. Ships of the Mantilla class were the first vessels of the Argentine Coast Guard able to operate on board helicopters (AS.365 Dauphin or AS.350 Écureuil).

Starting 2014 the ships of the class undergone a modernization program at Tandanor which will extend its operating life for 30 years

== List of vessels ==
Name	Pennant No.	Builder	Launched	Commissioned	Status	References
Doctor Manuel Mantilla	GC-24	Empresa Nacional Bazán	June 1981	5 April 1983	In service	
Azopardo	GC-25	Empresa Nacional Bazán	October 1981	15 July 1983	In service	
Thompson	GC-26	Empresa Nacional Bazán	December 1981	26 August 1983	In service	
Prefecto Fique	GC-27	Empresa Nacional Bazán	February 1982	18 November 1983	In service	
Prefecto Derbes	GC-28	Empresa Nacional Bazán	June 1982	14 March 1984	In service	

== Gallery ==
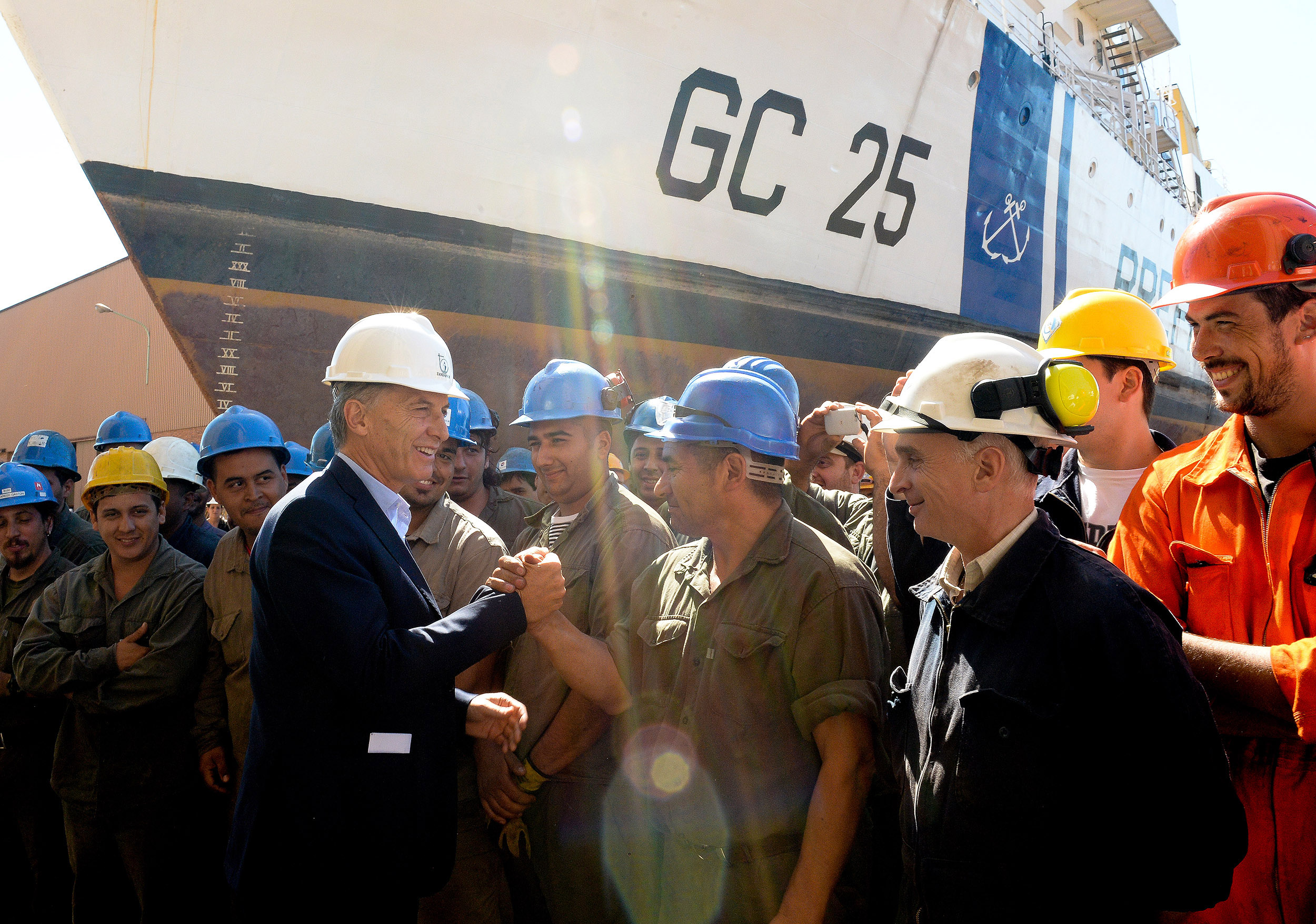
PNA Azopardo (GC-25) during overhaul

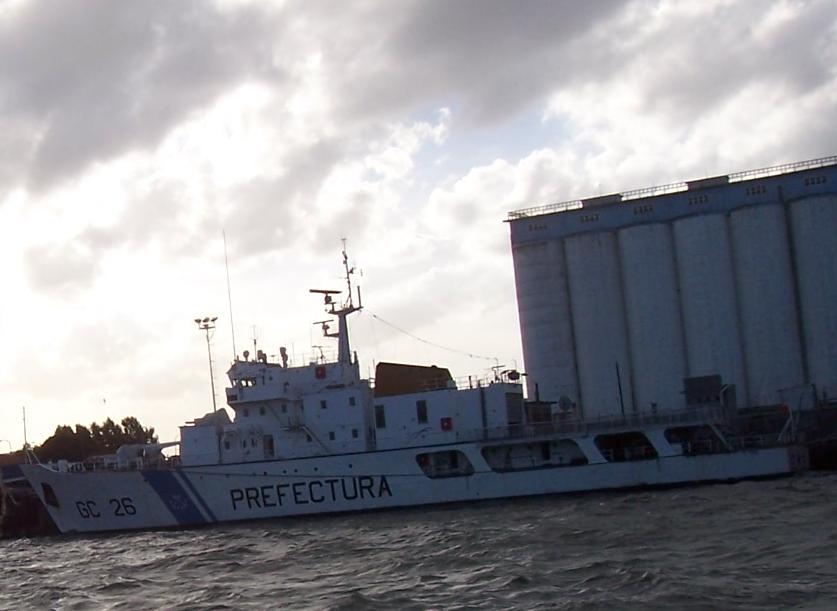
PNA Thompson (GC-26)

== See also ==
- Uribe-class patrol vessel
- Sinking of Chian-der 3
