= Chilean torpedo boat Quidora =

Torpedo boat

History

Chile
- Name: Quidora
- Builder: Astillero Bazán, in Cádiz (later Navantia)
- Cost: U$D 750,000
- Yard number: 83
- Launched: 29 April 1965
- Identification: Hull number: PTF-82; LSG-1605

General characteristics
- Type: Torpedo boat
- Tonnage: 134 t (132 long tons)
- Length: 36.20 m (118 ft 9 in)
- Beam: 5.60 m (18 ft 4 in)
- Draught: 2.20 m (7 ft 3 in)
- Installed power: 3,200 hp (2,400 kW)
- Propulsion: 2 diesel Mercedez Benz 839 Bb engines
- Speed: 28–32 knots (52–59 km/h; 32–37 mph)
- Range: 1,200 nmi (2,200 km; 1,400 mi) at 17 kn (31 km/h; 20 mph)
- Complement: 20
- Armament: as PTF: 2 × Bofors L/70 40 mm guns, 4 × 533 mm torpedo tubes; as LSG: 1 × Bofors L/70 40 mm gun, 2 × Oerlikon 20 mm cannon.

Quidora was one of four torpedo boats built in Spain for the Chilean Navy since 1962, based on the German FPB-36 Jaguar-class fast attack craft design by Lürssen Werft. Her sister ship Fresia (PTF-81) is now a museum ship in Punta Arenas.

== Design ==
The original design of the German Jaguar-class fast attack craft included four Mercedes-Benz MB 518 B diesel engines, a speed of 42 knots (78 km/h; 48 mph) and a 700-nautical-mile (1,300 km; 810 mi) range of operation. But in order to operate in the fjords and channels of Chile the boat needed a greater range and time of operation in sea, hence only two engines were installed and the speed was reduced to 28 knots (52 km/h; 32 mph). This class was later named Barceló class in Spain.

Boat name	HCS	HCS	Launched
Guacolda	PTF-80	LSG-1607	
Fresia	PTF-81	LSG-1608	
Quidora	PTF-82	LSG-1605	1965
Tegualda	PTF-83	LSG-1606	1965

== Quidora incident ==
In November 1967, under the command of Lieutenant Leonardo Prieto Vial, Quidora entered in the Argentine Bay of Ushuaia repelling Argentine warships that where occupying the disputed canals during the Beagle conflict. Lieutenant Prieto was retired from the navy after the incident by Chilean President Eduardo Frei.

== ARA Gurruchaga incident ==
On February 19, 1982, six weeks before the beginning of the Falklands War, an incident occurred that could have sparked a full-fledged war between Chile and Argentina during the Papal mediation in the Beagle conflict. An Argentine patrol boat, ARA Gurruchaga was anchored at Deceit Island inside the Beagle zone under mediation in Vatican, ostensibly providing support for sports boats participating in the Rio de Janeiro-Sydney boat race. Quidora approached and ordered the Argentine ship to leave the area. She fired several warning shots when the Argentine craft refused to move, as other Chilean ships converged to the scene. Although originally ordered not to leave the area and to wait for Argentine warships to arrive, the Argentine patrol boat received new orders to proceed to port as it became obvious that the Chilean Navy had no intentions of backing down.

== Service boat ==
In 1997 the boat was refitted as general service boat (Lancha de Servicio General) and served at Valparaíso, Coquimbo, Iquique and Arica. Her hull classification symbol was changed to LSG-1605.

== Museum ==
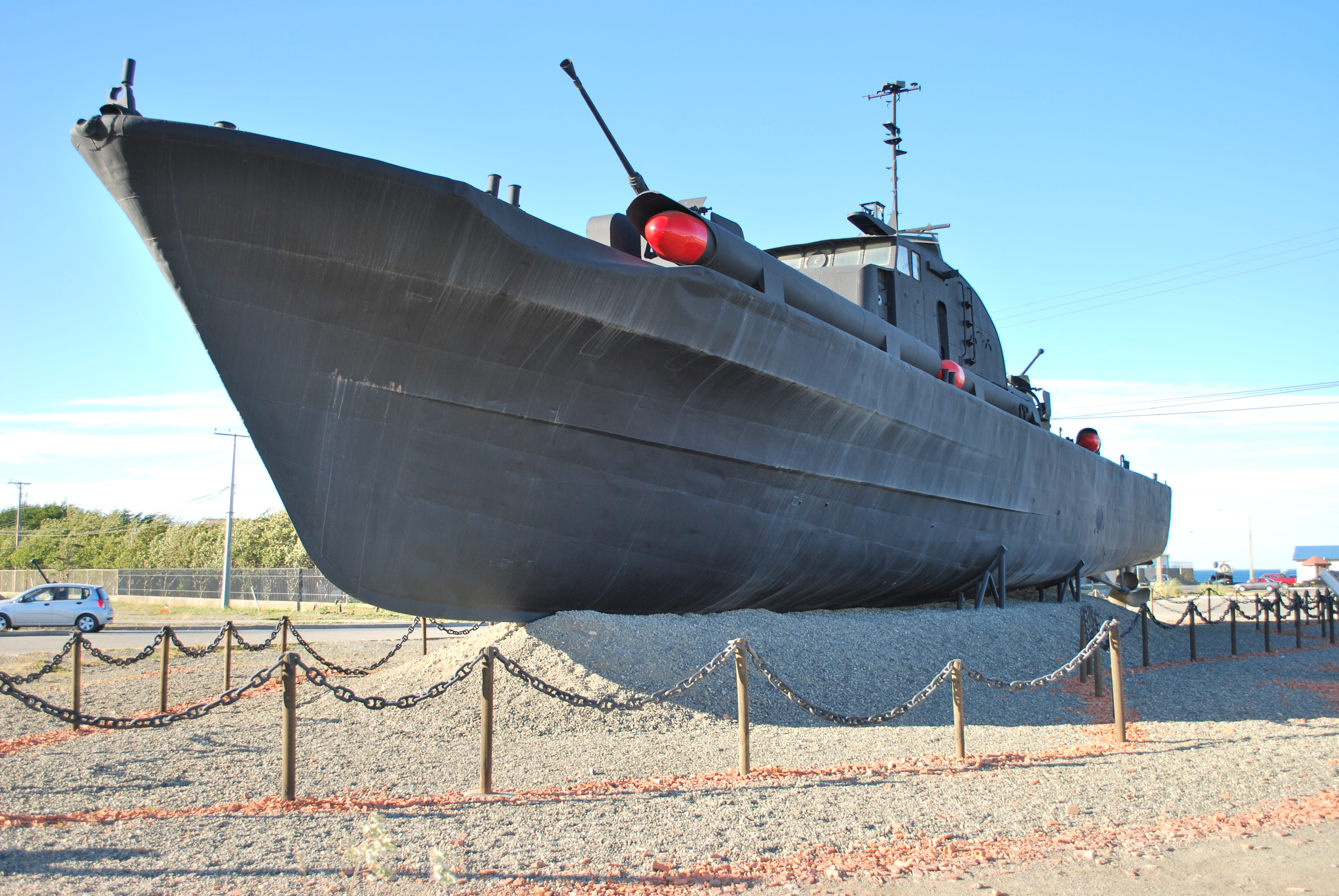
Fresia PTF-81, one of the four boats, as Museum in Punta Arenas

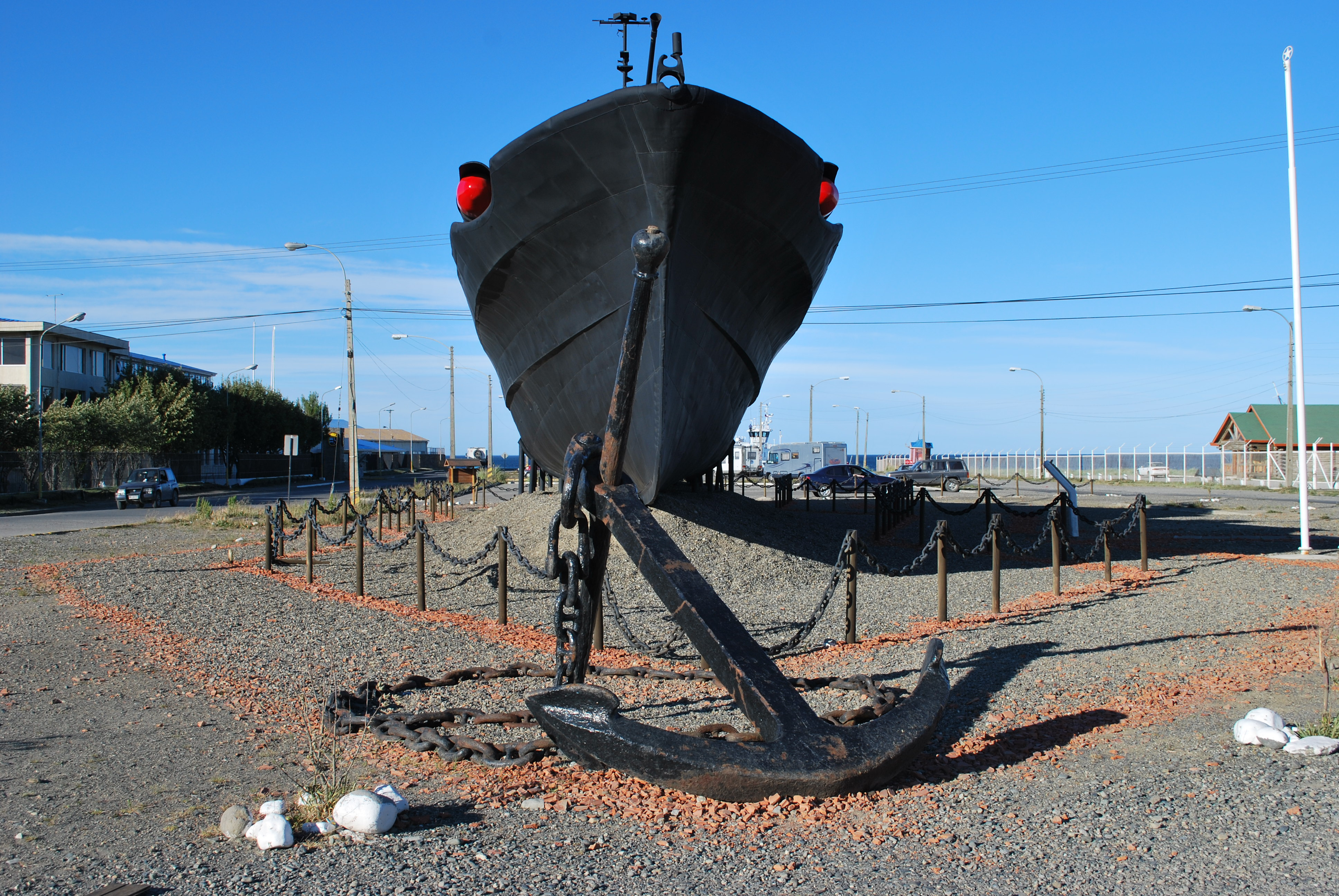
Fresia at Punta Arenas

Of the four boats, Fresia is now exhibited within Embarcadero Tres Puentes at the Punta Arenas Naval Base.

== See also ==
- List of violent incidents at the Argentine border
- List of decommissioned ships of the Chilean Navy
