= HMS Tiger Bay =

Royal Navy patrol boat captured from Argentina in the Falklands War

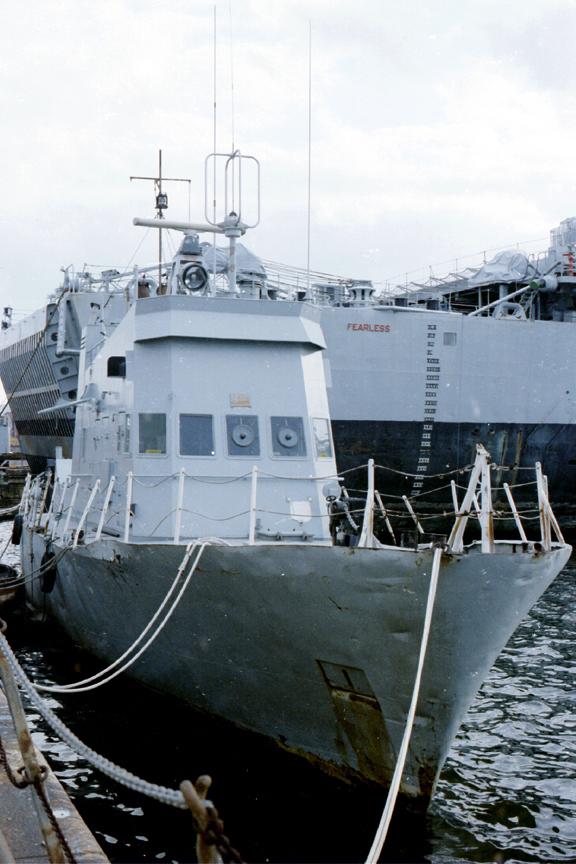
- HMS Tiger Bay alongside HMS Fearless at Portsmouth, 1985

History

Argentina
- Name: Islas Malvinas
- Operator: Prefectura Naval Argentina
- Builder: Blohm + Voss, Hamburg, Germany
- In service: 1978
- Identification: GC-82
- Fate: Seized, 14 June 1982

United Kingdom
- Name: HMS Tiger Bay
- Namesake: Tiger Bay
- Acquired: 14 June 1982
- Fate: Sold, 1986

General characteristics
- Class & type: Z-28-class patrol boat
- Displacement: 65 long tons (66 t)
- Length: 27.6 m (90 ft 7 in)
- Beam: 5.3 m (17 ft 5 in)
- Draught: 1.65 m (5 ft 5 in)
- Depth: 3.3 m (10 ft 10 in)
- Propulsion: 2 × MTU diesel engines, 785 kW (1,053 hp); 2 shafts
- Speed: 28 knots (52 km/h; 32 mph)
- Range: 1,200 nmi (2,200 km; 1,400 mi) at 12 knots (22 km/h; 14 mph)
- Complement: 15
- Armament: 2 × M2 Browning .50 calibre machine guns

HMS Tiger Bay was a Z-28-class patrol boat operated by the British Royal Navy, previously the Argentine Coast Guard vessel PNA Islas Malvinas (GC-82), which was seized at Port Stanley by the crew of HMS Cardiff on 14 June 1982 following the Argentine surrender during the Falklands War.

== Operational history ==
Islas Malvinas was one of twenty vessels of the class built for Argentina by Blohm + Voss of Hamburg, Germany, all of which entered service in 1978.

Following the Argentine 1982 invasion of the Falkland Islands on 2 April 1982, Islas Malvinas and her sister ship Río Iguazú sailed from Puerto Nuevo, Buenos Aires, on 6 April, calling at Puerto Madryn and Puerto Deseado to refuel and take on supplies. The two vessels then covered the 700 kilometres (380 nmi) to Port Stanley, arriving on 13 April. The next day they were repainted from white to brown and green camouflage colours.

Islas Malvinas undertook reconnaissance patrols, radar sweeps, search-and-rescue missions, and pilotage of vessels entering Stanley Harbour. She also escorted supply ships to remote military outposts. On 30 April, a fault on one propeller shaft reduced her speed by half, though she continued to operate.

On 1 May, while escorting the supply ship ARA Forrest off Kidney Island, she engaged a British Lynx HAS.2 helicopter from the frigate HMS Alacrity. One crewman, Corporal Antonio Grigolato, was wounded by shrapnel before the helicopter retired after sustaining machine-gun hits from Forrest, which damaged its engine, fuselage, fuel tank, tail rotor, and cockpit.

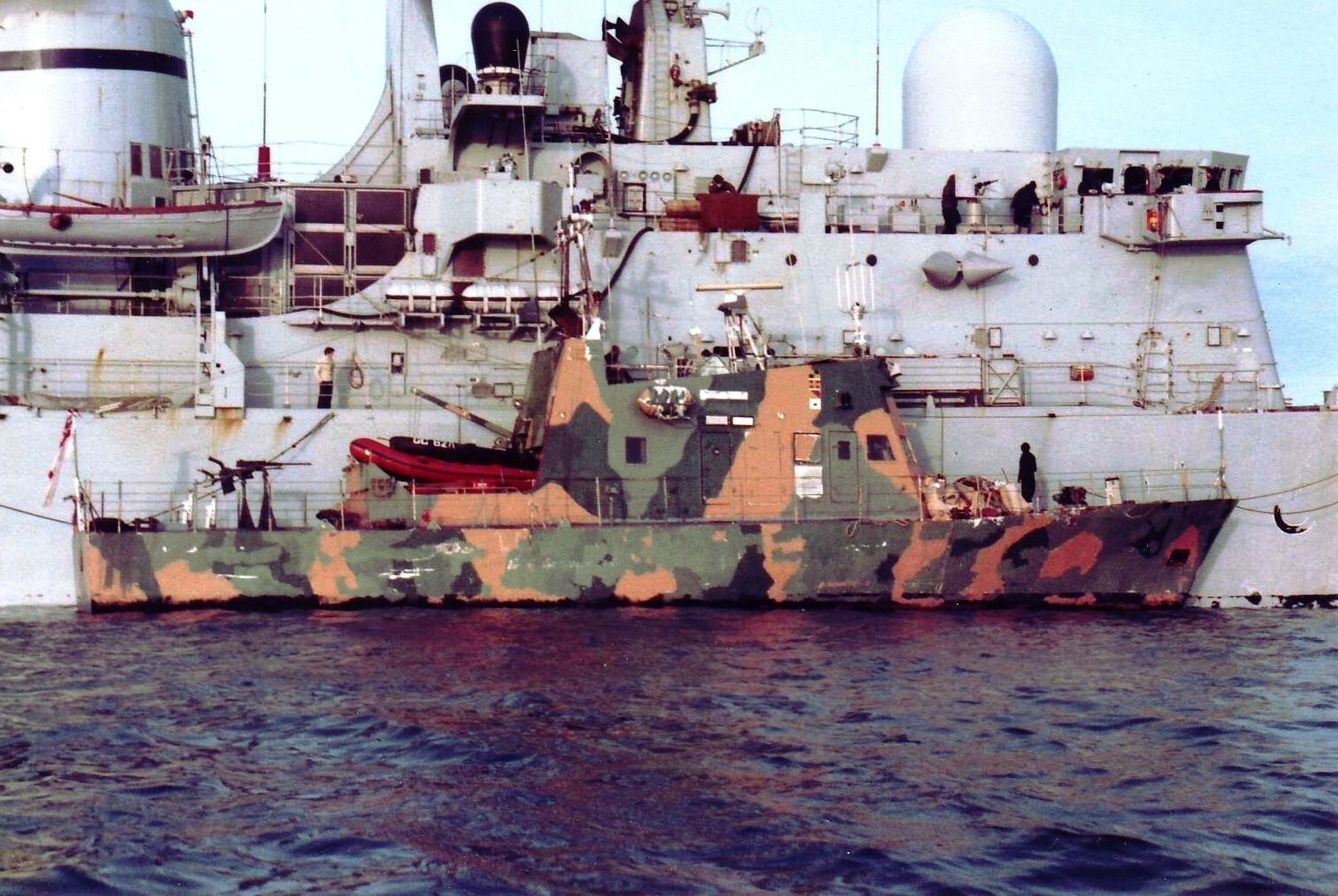
HMS Tiger Bay, formerly PNA Islas Malvinas, alongside HMS Cardiff near Port Stanley Harbour, 1982

On 14 June, following the cessation of hostilities, she was manned by five sailors from HMS Cardiff and HMS Bristol, and operated as HMS Tiger Bay, named after the Tiger Bay district of Cardiff.

She originally carried a tripod mast, which was lost while transferring wounded personnel to the hospital ship Uganda in moderate swells, when Uganda’s hull rose and crushed the upper structure. The mast was not replaced. She later served as a courier vessel, ferrying essential stores and supplies from anchored ships to personnel ashore at various points around the islands. Soon after the Royal Navy crew took command, a booby-trap was discovered in the aft ammunition locker, left by the departing Argentine crew. The Argentine engineer responsible was located and compelled to return to disarm the device.

After the Argentine surrender, HMS Tiger Bay and her Royal Navy crew came under fire on several occasions while operating around the Falklands. Some incidents involved isolated Argentine personnel who had not yet surrendered, while others were caused by British troops unaware the vessel was now under British control.

After completing post-war patrol duties, the vessel was transported to HM Naval Base Portsmouth, before being sold out of naval service in June 1986. She was reportedly sold into private ownership, and renamed Survey Challenger, although no verified registry or operational record confirms subsequent ownership or fate. No traceable entry appears in Lloyd's Register or the UK ship-disposal archives after 1986, suggesting the vessel was either scrapped shortly after sale or remained unregistered in private hands.

== Legacy ==
A name board from Islas Malvinas, which had been presented to Royal Marine Colonel Ian Baxter, was sold at auction in 2009 for more than £5,000, ten times its estimated value.
