= Sinking of Chian-der 3 =

1986 maritime incident

Coordinates: 51.50°S 64.70°W

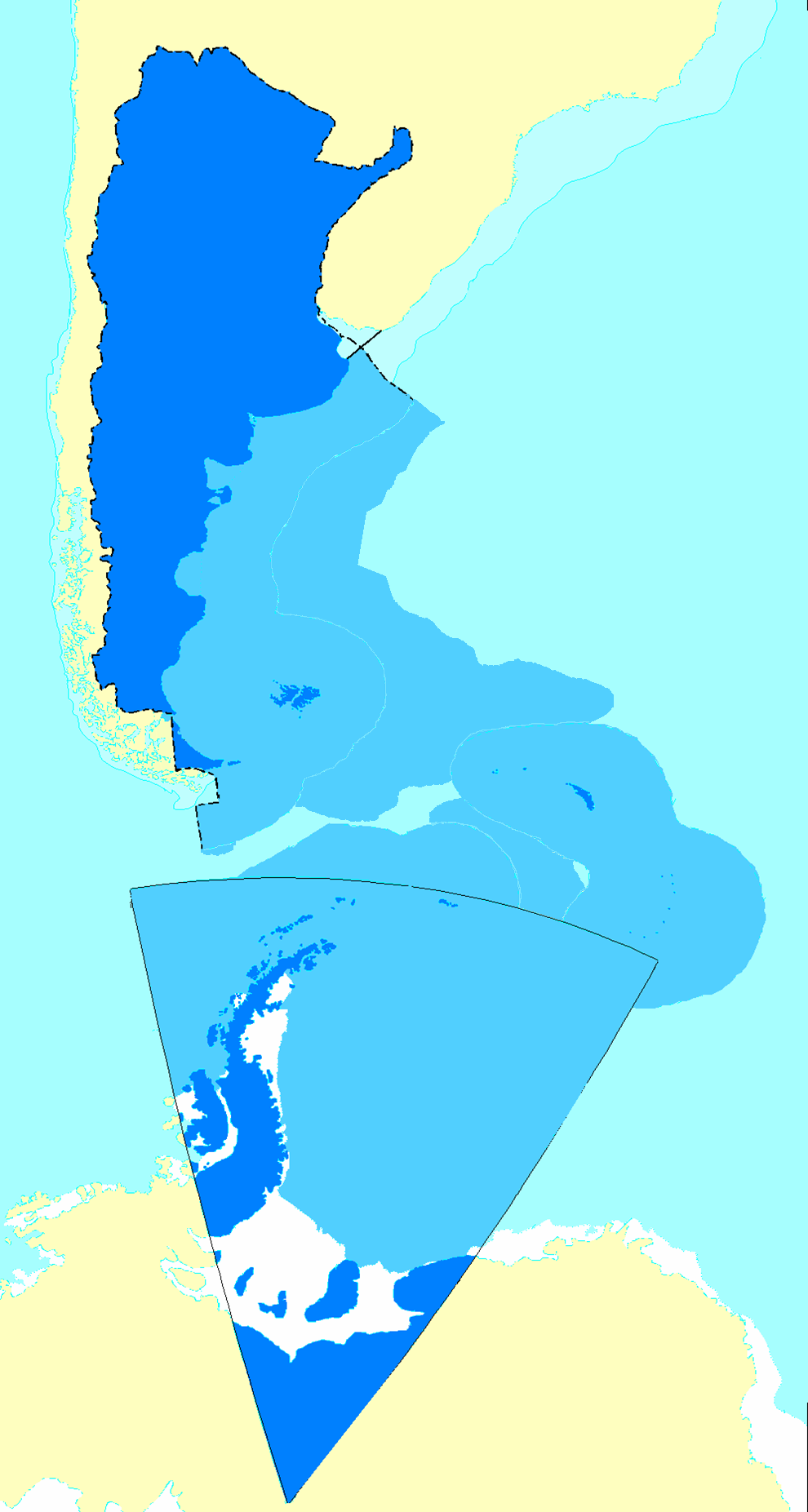
Territories and exclusive economic zones claimed by Argentina

The sinking of Chian-der 3 was an incident that occurred on 28 May 1986, when the Taiwanese-flagged trawler Chian-der 3 was detected, tracked, fired upon, set on fire and eventually sunk by the Mantilla-class patrol vessel PNA Prefecto Derbes of the Prefectura Naval Argentina, at a location 24 nautical miles (44 km; 28 mi) outside the United Kingdom's Total Exclusion Zone, which covers a circle of 200 nautical miles (370 km; 230 mi) from the centre of the Falklands Islands. Two Taiwanese fishermen were killed; four others were injured.

== Background ==
The overlapping of the exclusive economic zone of the Argentine mainland and the Falkland Islands and the British exclusion zone for Argentine ships is used by fishing fleets in order to fish without permission, said the Argentine government.

According to an Argentine statement the trawler Chi-Fu 6 was detected fishing in the Argentine zone at 11:45, but she took refuge in the British zone. At 18:25 the trawler Chian-der 3 was spotted again within the Argentine zone of 200 nautical miles (230 mi). Despite requests to stop and warning shots being fired by Prefecto Derbes, the trawler escaped and was chased. At 21:05 the Argentine commander stated that he saw that the trawler stopped and emitting smoke from the engine room. He ordered the rescue of the trawler's crew. According to official sources, the trawler was hit by non-explosive rounds. As a result of the incident, one Taiwanese fisherman was killed and four others wounded. Another member of the crew became missing.

The Taiwan fishermen's union called it a "barbaric act" and the British government condemned it as "unjustifiable and excessive".
