= Martín Jacobo Thompson =

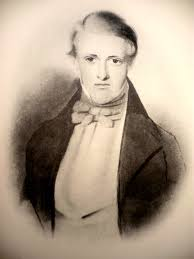
- portrait of Martín Jacobo Thompson

Capitán del Puerto de Buenos Aires
- In office 1810–1815

Personal details
- Born: Martín Jacobo José Thompson y López Escribano; April 23, 1777 Buenos Aires, Viceroyalty of Río de la Plata
- Died: October 23, 1819 (aged 42) At sea
- Spouse: Mariquita Sánchez
- Occupation: Politician
- Profession: naval Officer
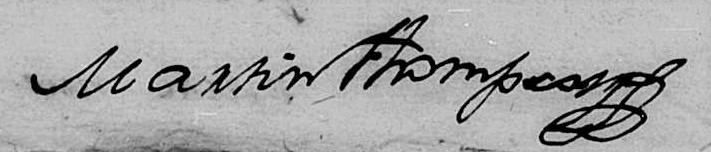
- Signature

Military service
- Allegiance: Spain — until 1810 (Argentina) United Provinces of the River Plate
- Branch/service: Spanish Navy; Argentine Navy
- Years of service: 1800-1819
- Rank: Colonel
- Battles/wars: British invasions of the Río de la Plata; May Revolution

Martín Jacobo Thompson (1777–1819) was an Argentine patriot, who had an active participation during the English invasions, and the Revolution of May. He is considered the founder of the Argentine Naval Prefecture.

== Biography ==
Martín Jacobo Thompson was educated at the Royal College of San Carlos, and also in London, England. In 1796, he entered the Naval Academy in Ferrol. On July 11, 1800, he began his military career in the Spanish navy. Thompson had participated in the defense of the city during the British invasion in Montevideo, where he was wounded, and in Rio de la Plata, where captured several enemy brigs, being promoted to the rank of ensign of the Spanish Armada.

He was one of the promoters of the May Revolution of 1810, and attended the Cabildo Abierto on May 22. He was appointed by the Primera Junta as Captain of the port of Buenos Aires, where he served until 1815.

In 1813 Thompson held the rank of lieutenant colonel, and was promoted to colonel in 1816. That year, he was appointed by the Supreme Director, Ignacio Álvarez Thomas, to a diplomatic mission to United States. He arrived in Washington, D.C., in August 1816, with the intention of meeting with President James Madison. However, Madison was on vacation, so Thompson decided to travel to New York City, where he started negotiations for the purchase of war material.

Martín Jacobo Thompson died on October 23, 1819, at sea.

== Family ==
Martín Jacobo was the son of William Paul Thompson, born in 1721 in London, and Tiburcia Valeriana López, a criolla, born in Buenos Aires, who was a descendant of Pedro Sánchez Rendón. His father had arrived in Buenos Aires in 1750. He belonged to the elite of English merchants, who were established in Cádiz. Martín Thompson had married on July 29, 1805, with Mariquita Sánchez, daughter of Cecilio Sánchez de Velasco and María Magdalena Trillo y Cárdenas, belonging to a distinguished family.

His wife descended from distinguished lineages of the Río de la Plata, including Melchor Casco de Mendoza, and the Portuguese family of Gonzalez de Mora and Ines Nuñez Cabral (sister of Margarida Cabral de Melo). Thompson and Mariquita Sánchez were parents of five children: Clementina (1805), Juan Thompson b. 1809 (educated in Europe, Magdalena (1811), Florencia Martina (1812), and Albina Dolores born on February 28, 1815.
