= Melchor Casco de Mendoza =

Alcalde (2nd vote) of Buenos Aires
- In office 1605–1606
- Monarch: Philip III

Personal details
- Born: Melchor Casco de Mendoza y Valderrama; 1581 Asunción, Paraguay
- Died: 1658 (aged 76–77) Buenos Aires, Argentina
- Occupation: Politician
- Profession: Militia
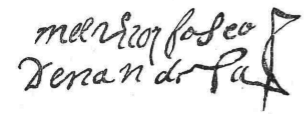
- Signature

Military service
- Allegiance: Spain
- Branch/service: Spanish Army
- Rank: Captain

Melchor Casco de Mendoza (1581–1658) was a Spanish nobleman, alcalde and alferez real of Buenos Aires. He also served as regidor of Asunción in 1620.

== Biography ==
Melchor was born in Asunción, the son of Víctor Casco de Mendoza and Lucía Valderrama, daughter of Juan de Fustes. He was married to Catalina Astor, daughter of Pedro de Izarra Astor and Úrsula Gómez y Luyz.

Melchor Casco de Mendoza was grandson of Gonzalo Casco and María Mendoza, daughter of Gonzalo de Mendoza and Isabel Irala (daughter of Domingo Martínez de Irala).
