= USS Luiseno =

Tugboat of the United States Navy

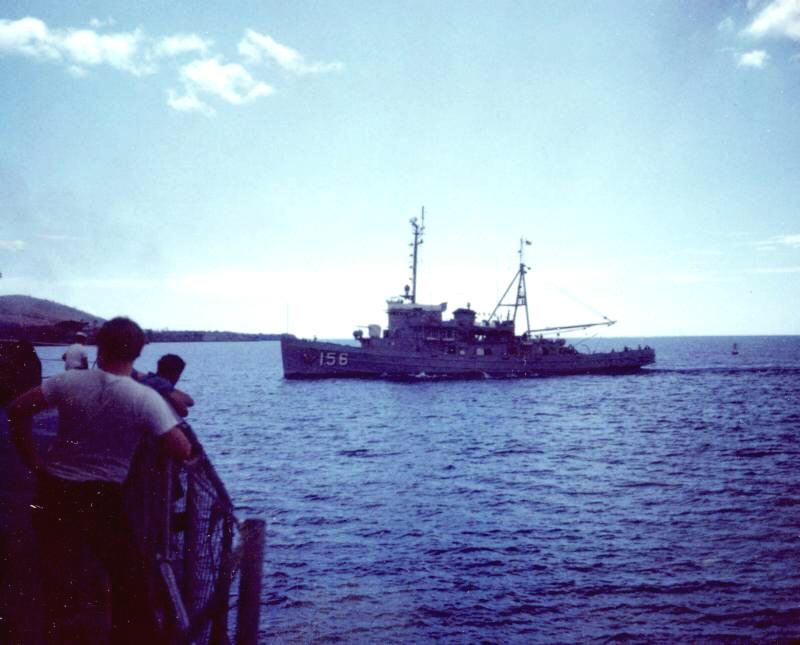
- USS Luiseno

History

United States
- Name: USS Luiseno
- Builder: Charleston Shipbuilding & Drydock Co.
- Laid down: 7 November 1944
- Launched: 17 March 1945
- Commissioned: 16 June 1945
- Decommissioned: 1 July 1975
- Stricken: 1 July 1975
- Fate: Transferred to Argentina, 1 July 1975
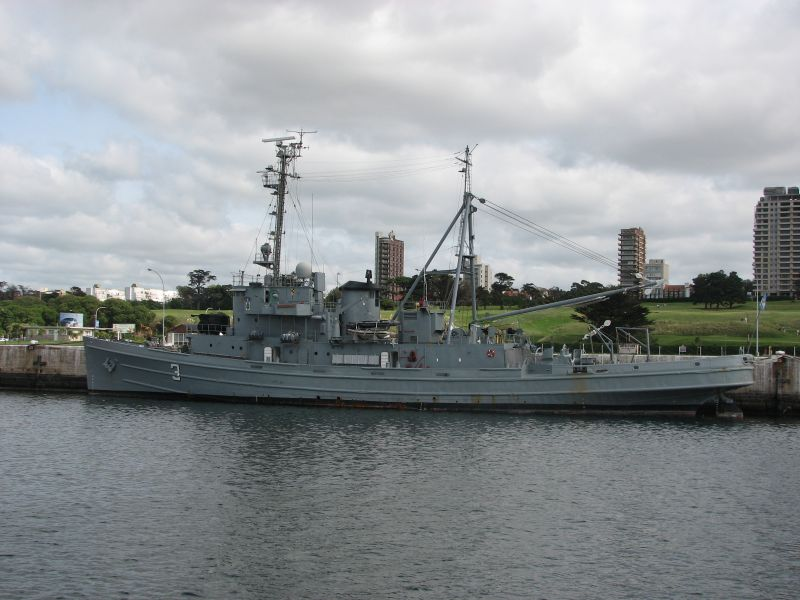
- ARA Francisco de Gurruchaga (A-3)

History

Argentina
- Name: ARA Francisco de Gurruchaga (A-3)
- Commissioned: July 1, 1975
- Decommissioned: 2024
- Fate: Sunk in a naval shooting exercise in the Argentine Sea between 22 and 25 October 2024

General characteristics
- Class & type: Abnaki-class fleet ocean tug
- Displacement: 1,205 long tons (1,224 t) light; 1,646 long tons (1,672 t) full
- Length: 205 ft (62 m)
- Beam: 38 ft 6 in (11.73 m)
- Draft: 17 ft (5.2 m)
- Propulsion: Diesel-electric; 4 × General Motors 12-278A diesel main engines driving 4 × General Electric generators and 3 × General Motors 3-268A auxiliary services engines, single screw
- Speed: 16.5 knots (19.0 mph; 30.6 km/h)
- Complement: 8 officers, 68 enlisted men
- Armament: 1 × 3-inch/50-caliber gun; 2 × twin 40 mm guns; 2 × 20 mm guns; 2 × depth charge tracks

USS Luiseno (ATF-156) was an Abnaki-class fleet ocean tug built for the United States Navy during World War II. Named after the Luiseño peoples (the southernmost division of the Shoshone Indians of California, who received their name from Mission San Luis Rey de Francia, the most important Spanish mission in their territory), she was the only U.S. Naval vessel to bear the name.

Transferred to the Argentine Navy in 1975, the ship remained in service as ARA Francisco de Gurruchaga (A-3) until October 2024 when she was decommissioned and sunk as part of a naval training exercise.

== Construction ==
Luiseno was laid down on 7 November 1944 by the Charleston Shipbuilding & Drydock Company of Charleston, South Carolina; launched on 17 March 1945; sponsored by Mrs. William J. Roth Jr.; and commissioned on 16 June 1945.

== Service history ==
=== US Navy service ===
After shakedown, Luiseno operated out of Norfolk, Virginia and Boston before sailing for Florida 28 July. For the rest of the year she performed salvage and target towing services in the Florida/Cuba area. During the summer of 1946 the fleet tug made a cruise to Bremerhaven, Germany to tow a 350-ton crane to Cristóbal in the Canal Zone, arriving there 20 September. From 1946 Luiseno performed miscellaneous duties including target towing, salvage operations, and other vital services, along the east coast, in the Caribbean and from her home port, Newport, Rhode Island.

During the Cuban Missile Crisis in October 1962 she operated out of the Guantanamo Naval Base, ready to perform any duty for which she would be called. Luiseno removed aircraft wreckage from the 1966 Palomares B-52 crash for dumping in the Atlantic.

Luiseno received the Navy Unit Commendation, Navy Expeditionary Medal (2-Cuba), American Campaign Medal, World War II Victory Medal, National Defense Service Medal, and the Armed Forces Expeditionary Medal (1-Cuba).

=== Argentine Navy service ===
Decommissioned and struck from the Naval Vessel Register on 1 July 1975, Luiseno was subsequently transferred to Argentina under terms of the Security Assistance Program and renamed ARA Francisco de Gurruchaga (A-3). She served with the Argentine Navy until 2024, when she was sunk in a naval shooting exercise.

==== Gurruchaga incident ====
On 19 February 1982, six weeks before the beginning of the Falklands War, an incident occurred that could have sparked a full-fledged war between Chile and Argentina during the Papal mediation in the Beagle conflict. ARA Gurruchaga was anchored at Deceit Island inside the Beagle zone under mediation in Vatican, ostensibly providing support for sports boats participating in the Rio de Janeiro-Sydney boat race. The Quidora torpedo Boat approached and ordered the Argentine ship to leave the area. She fired several warning shots when the Argentine craft refused to move, as other Chilean ships converged to the scene. Although originally ordered not to leave the area and to wait for Argentine warships to arrive, the Argentine patrol boat received new orders to proceed to port as it became obvious that the Chilean navy had no intentions of backing down.

==== Falklands war ====
During the Falklands war, Gurruchaga was assigned to support Task Group 79.3, centered around the cruiser ARA General Belgrano. When Belgrano was torpedoed by the British submarine HMS Conqueror on 2 May 1982, she sailed from Ushuaia to participate in rescue operations. From a total of 770 crewmembers rescued, 365 were saved by Gurruchaga, whose powerful searchlights and low freeboard proved particularly useful in recovering survivors from their liferafts.
