= Pizzaro-class gunboat =

Class of escort vessels

Class overview
- Builders: Sociedad Española de Construcción Naval, Ferrol
- Operators: Spanish Navy
- Preceded by: Eolo-class minelayer
- In commission: 1946–1982
- Completed: 8
- Scrapped: 8

General characteristics
- Type: Gunboat/Frigate
- Displacement: 1,740 t (1,710 long tons) standard
- Length: 95.20 m (312 ft 4 in) o/a
- Beam: 12.15 m (39 ft 10 in)
- Draught: 3.40 m (11 ft 2 in)
- Installed power: 5,000 shp (3,700 kW)
- Propulsion: 2 × Yarrow boilers; 2 × steam turbines
- Speed: 18.5 knots (34.3 km/h; 21.3 mph)
- Complement: 250
- Armament: 6× 120 mm (4.7 in) guns; 8× 37 mm anti-aircraft guns; 6× 20 mm anti-aircraft guns; 30 mines; Depth charges

The Pizzaro class was a class of eight escort vessels built for the Spanish Navy in the 1940s. Built at Ferrol, they were completed in 1946–1950 rated as gunboats, and were redesignated as frigates in 1959. They started to be withdrawn from use in 1968, with the last of the class, Vincente Yañez Pinzon, stricken in 1982.

== Design ==
The Pizarro class were based on the Eolo-class minelayers, two of which were built for the Spanish Navy, launched in 1939–40 and completed in 1942–43. While the Eolo class were designed to combine the role of minelaying and escort, the Pizarros were more specialist escort vessels, with a heavy gun armament.

The ships were 95.20 metres (312 ft 4 in) long overall and 87.54 metres (287 ft 2 in) between perpendiculars, with a beam of 12.15 metres (39 ft 10 in) and a draught of 3.40 metres (11 ft 2 in). Displacement was 1,740 tonnes (1,710 long tons) standard and 2,282 tonnes (2,246 long tons) full load. Two Yarrow boilers fed steam to two sets of Parsons geared steam turbines. The machinery was rated at 5,000 shaft horsepower (3,700 kW), giving a speed of 18.5 knots (34.3 km/h; 21.3 mph). A maximum of 402 tons of oil fuel could be carried, giving a range of 3,000 nautical miles (5,600 km; 3,500 mi) at 14 knots (26 km/h; 16 mph).

The ships' main gun armament consisted of six 120-millimetre (4.7 in) guns in three twin mounts, with one forward and two aft. Eight 37 mm (1.5 in) and six 20 mm (0.8 in) guns comprised the close-in anti-aircraft armament. Some of the class (including Pizarro, Vasco Núñez de Balboa and Vicente Yáñez Pinzón) were originally armed with two 105 mm (4.1 in) anti-aircraft guns instead of the 120 mm guns before being rearmed with the intended armament. Anti-submarine armament consisted of four depth charge throwers, and up to 30 naval mines could be carried. (Note: Gardiner and Chesneau state a load of 40 mines.) The ships had a crew of 250.

Legazpi and Vicente Yáñez Pinzón were modernised in 1960 as part of a major programme of modernising ships of the Spanish Navy. (Note: A total of 30 Spanish warships were fitted with more modern anti-aircraft and anti-submarine armament and sensors between 1959 and 1960.) The two ships were completely re-armed, with a gun armament of two American 127 mm (5 in) 38 calibre dual purpose guns in two single mounts, with a close-in anti-aircraft armament of four 40 mm (1.6 in) Bofors L/70 guns. Anti-submarine armament consisted of two racks for anti-submarine torpedoes (eight torpedoes were carried), two Hedgehog anti-submarine mortar batteries, eight depth-charge throwers and two depth-charge racks.

== Service ==
The eight ships were all launched at the Sociedad Española de Construcción Naval (SECN) shipyard at Ferrol dockyard in August 1944. Financial problems in Francoist Spain delayed construction of the ships, which were completed from 1947 to 1951. They were initially rated as Cañoneros (gunboats) and were re-rated as Fragatas (frigates) in 1958.

Two ships were discarded in 1968, with most of the rest of the class stricken in the next few years. By 1978, only Vicente Yáñez Pinzón remained in service. She remained in service until 1982.

== Ships ==
Name	Pennant Number (Note: From 1961)	Launched	Completed	Fate
Hernán Cortés	F32	3 August 1944	18 September 1947	Stricken 2 December 1971
Legazpi	F42	8 August 1944	8 August 1951	Stricken 4 November 1978
Magallanes	F35	8 August 1944	20 December 1948	Stricken 1972
Martín Alonso Pinzón	F34	3 August 1944	18 March 1948	Stricken 1968
Pizarro	F31	3 August 1944	9 August 1946	Stricken 1968
Sarmiento de Gamboa	F36	8 August 1944	2 May 1950	Stricken 1973
Vasco Núñez de Balboa	F33	3 August 1944	15 March 1947	Stricken 1972
Vicente Yáñez Pinzón	F41	3 August 1944	5 August 1949	Stricken 1982
