= Argentine Naval Prefecture =

Argentine Naval Prefecture Prefectura Naval Argentina
- Emblem of the Prefecture.
- Abbreviation: PNA
- Motto: Robur et quies iuxta litora et in undis Valour and safety in coasts and waters

Agency overview
- Formed: June 1810

Jurisdictional structure
- Federal agency (Operations jurisdiction): Argentina
- Operations jurisdiction: Argentina
- Legal jurisdiction: As per operations jurisdiction
- General nature: Federal law enforcement; Gendarmerie
- Specialist jurisdiction: Coastal patrol, marine border protection, marine search and rescue

Operational structure
- Headquarters: Ave. E. Madero 235, Buenos Aires
- Elected officer responsible: Patricia Bullrich, Minister of Security
- Agency executives: Prefect General Eduardo Scarzello, National Prefect; Prefect General Hugo Ilacqua, National Subprefect
- Parent agency: Ministry of Security
- Zones: 10: Alto Paraná; Alto Uruguay; Paraná Superior and Paraguay; Lower Uruguay; Lower Paraná; Delta; Río de la Plata; North Argentine Sea; South Argentine Sea; Lacustre and Comahue

Facilities
- Helicopters: 7
- Planes: 10

Website
- argentina.gob.ar/prefecturanaval
- Phone: 54 11 4318 7400; March: March of the Naval Prefecture

The Argentine Naval Prefecture (Spanish: Prefectura Naval Argentina or PNA) is a service of Argentina's Security Ministry charged with protecting the country's rivers and maritime territory. It therefore fulfills the functions of other countries' coast guards, and furthermore acts as a gendarmerie force policing navigable rivers.

According to the Argentine Constitution, the Armed Forces of the Argentine Republic cannot intervene in internal civil conflicts, so the Prefecture is defined as a civilian "security force of a military nature". It maintains a functional relationship with the Ministry of Defense, as part of both the National Defense System and the Interior Security System. It therefore maintains capabilities arising from the demands required by joint military planning with the armed forces.

The PNA is a large organization for a coastguard. With a strength of 45,750 sworn members, the PNA is a larger organization than most national navies, and is in fact slightly larger than the Argentine Navy – the organization upon which it had been attached for a long time until the 1980s, when it was transferred to direct control of the Ministry of Defense.

== History ==
=== Creation ===
The Prefecture's predecessor is the ports service founded by the first autonomous Argentine government in June 1810, six years before Argentina declared independence. In Argentina this is considered the official founding date of the PNA. The first commander of the force was Colonel Martín Jacobo Thompson, a Porteño of partially English descent who had served against the British in the invasions of 1806–7.Thompson was given the title of "Captain of Ports" ("Capitán de Puertos").

Although the PNA traces itself back to its predecessor of 1806, the modern Prefecture was in fact founded in the late nineteenth century as the "National Maritime Prefecture" on the initiative of Manuel Florencio Mantilla, a well-known Argentine senator who was also a respected academic and intellectual. The law pertaining to it was enacted in October 1896.

=== Falklands War ===
The Prefecture had a minor role in the Falklands War (Spanish: Guerra de las Malvinas). As with other Argentine military services, participation in this conflict is given considerable weight in the institutional memory of the service.

Two PNA patrol vessels, Islas Malvinas (GC-82) and Rio Iguazu (GC-83), were sent to provide an Argentine coastguard service to the islands. According to Argentine sources, Rio Iguazu came into contact with a British Sea Harrier aircraft on 21 May and one member of the vessel's crew was killed while firing a 12.7 mm machine gun at the British jet. The ship ran aground, but most of its cargo -among them two 105 mm howitzers- was recovered later.

The crew of the patrol boat claimed the shooting down of the aircraft, but this was later proved to be unfounded. The sortie was actually carried out by two Sea Harriers of 800 Naval Air Squadron, Nº XZ460 and XZ499, which strafed the vessel with 30 mm cannon fire. The patrol vessel Islas Malvinas was captured and operated by the Royal Navy, as HMS Tiger Bay.

The Argentine Naval Prefecture purchased five Short SC.7 Skyvan unarmed light transport aircraft in 1971, which they gave the call signs PA-50 to PA-54. During the Falklands War these aircraft were assigned to conduct search and reconnaissance, rescue and transport duties. PA-50 arrived at BAN Río Grande on 15 April 1982 and was joined by PA-54 arrived on 17 April 1982. PA-54 was subsequently deployed to Stanley/EAN Malvinas on 20 April 1982 and was joined on the Falklands by PA-50 on 30 April 1982, which was based at Pebble Island/EAN Calderón. Meanwhile, PA-51 was deployed to EAN Río Gallegos on 24 April 1982 and PA-52 to BAN Río Grande on 11 May 1982. While waiting to be put into service PA-54 was damaged while sitting on the Stanley racecourse by British naval gunfire on the evening of 3 May 1982. It did not fly again and was finally destroyed by shellfire during British bombardments on 12/13 June 1982. PA-50 saw some action at Pebble Island, but it ended up becoming bogged down in the soft ground, and on 15 May 1982 it was destroyed by a British raiding party. At the conclusion of the war PA-51 and PA-52 returned to Aeroparque Jorge Newbery/Buenos Aires on 26 June 1982.

== Illegal fishing ==
The Prefecture is constantly battling illegal fishing vessels in the Argentine exclusive economic zone (EEZ), mostly from eastern countries. The Argentine Naval Aviation also collaborates in detection of such ships with their CASA 212 S68 and Beechcraft 350ER' maritime surveillance aircraft.

=== Chian-der 3 incident ===
The sinking of Chian-der 3 was an incident which occurred on 28 May 1986 when the Taiwanese flag naval trawler Chian-der 3 was detected, tracked, shot, set on fire and finally sunk by the PNA. The sinking was carried out by PNA vessel Prefecto Derbes. Two Taiwanese fishermen were killed; four others were injured. The Taiwanese fishermen's union called the incident a "barbaric act" and the British government condemned it as "unjustifiable and excessive".

== Organization ==
=== Headquarters ===
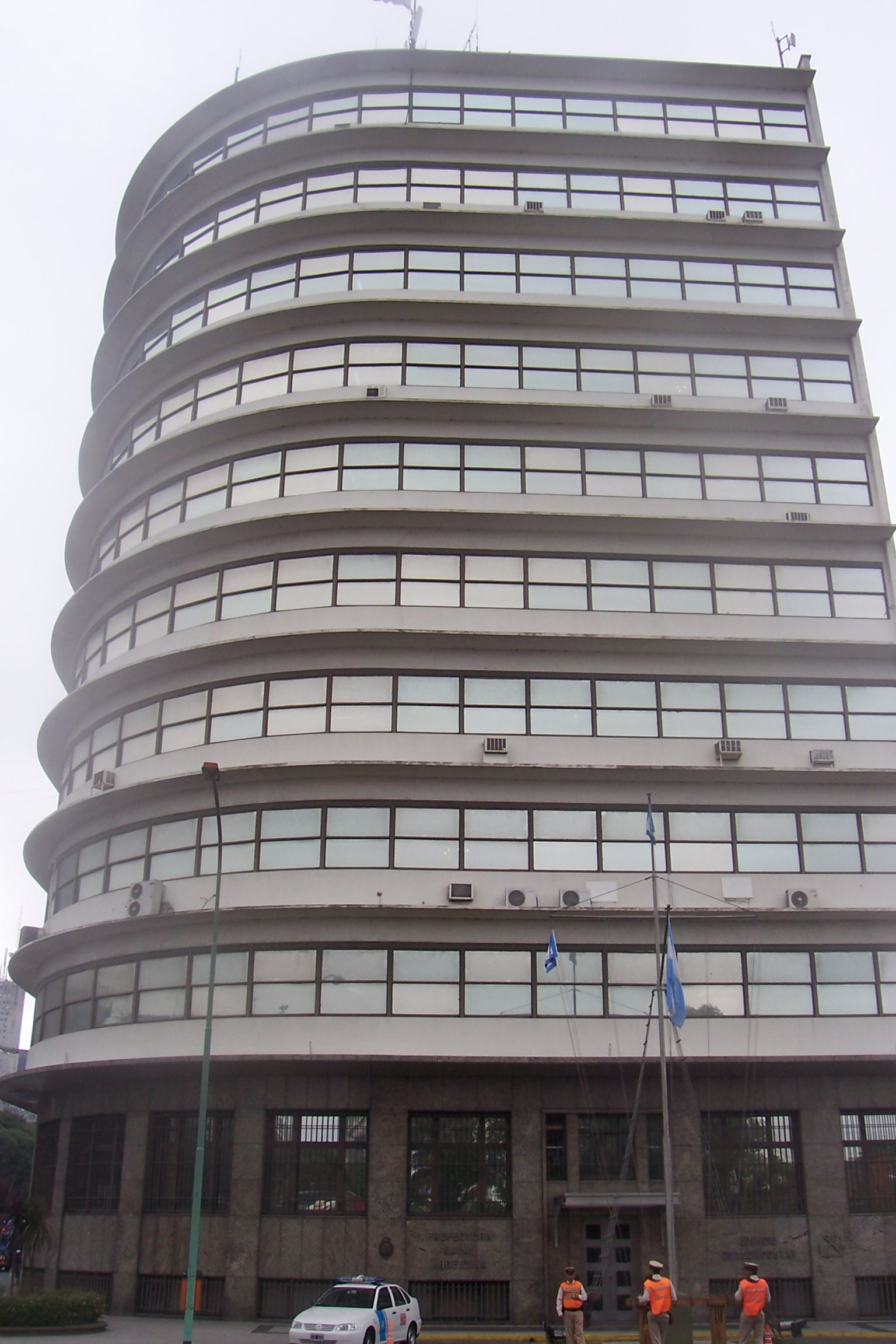
Guardacostas Building

The PNA is subordinate to the Ministry of Security. The organization is headed by the National Naval Prefect (Prefecto Nacional Naval), currently Prefect-General Carlos Edgardo Fernandez, assisted by the Deputy National Naval Prefect (Subprefecto Nacional Naval), currently Prefect-General Ricardo Rodriguez.

The Prefecture's main facility is located in the Edificio Guardacostas (which translates as "the Coastguard Building") at 235 E. Madero Avenue, Buenos Aires.

The PNA headquarters is divided into three main departments, each headed by a Director-General with the rank of Prefecto General. These are each divided into a number of directorates, each headed by a Director with the rank of Prefect-General (Prefecto General).

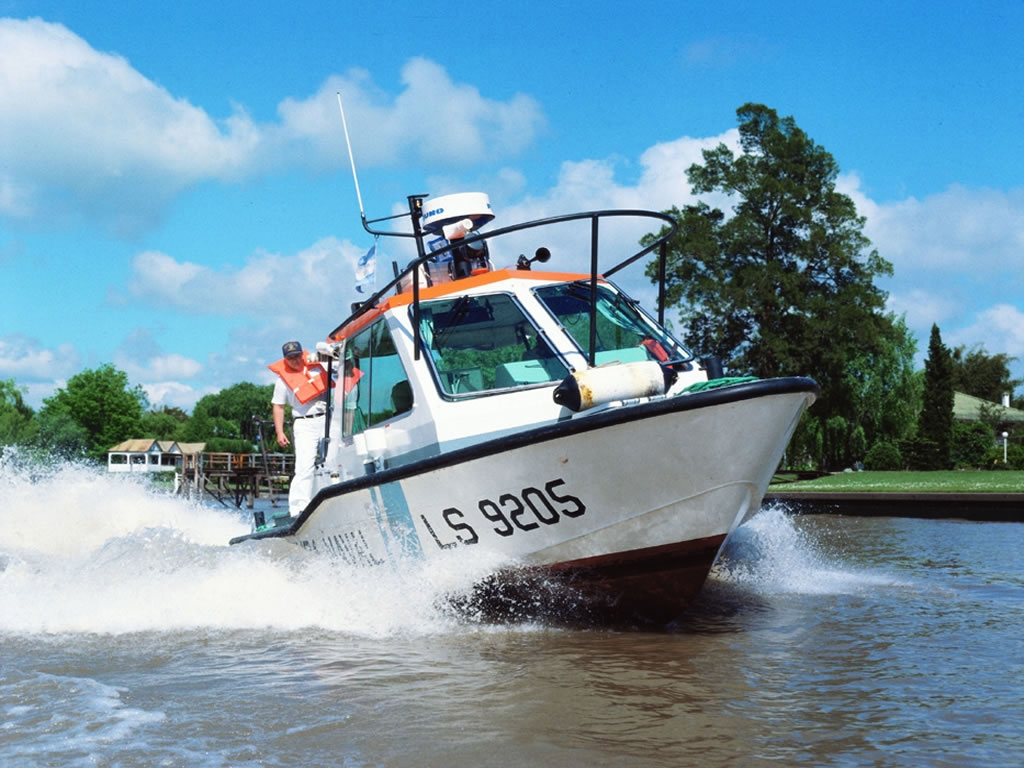
A Zodiac 920 class at Tigre

The Intelligence Service (Servicio de Inteligencia) is directly responsible to the National Naval Prefect and is also headed by a Prefect-General.

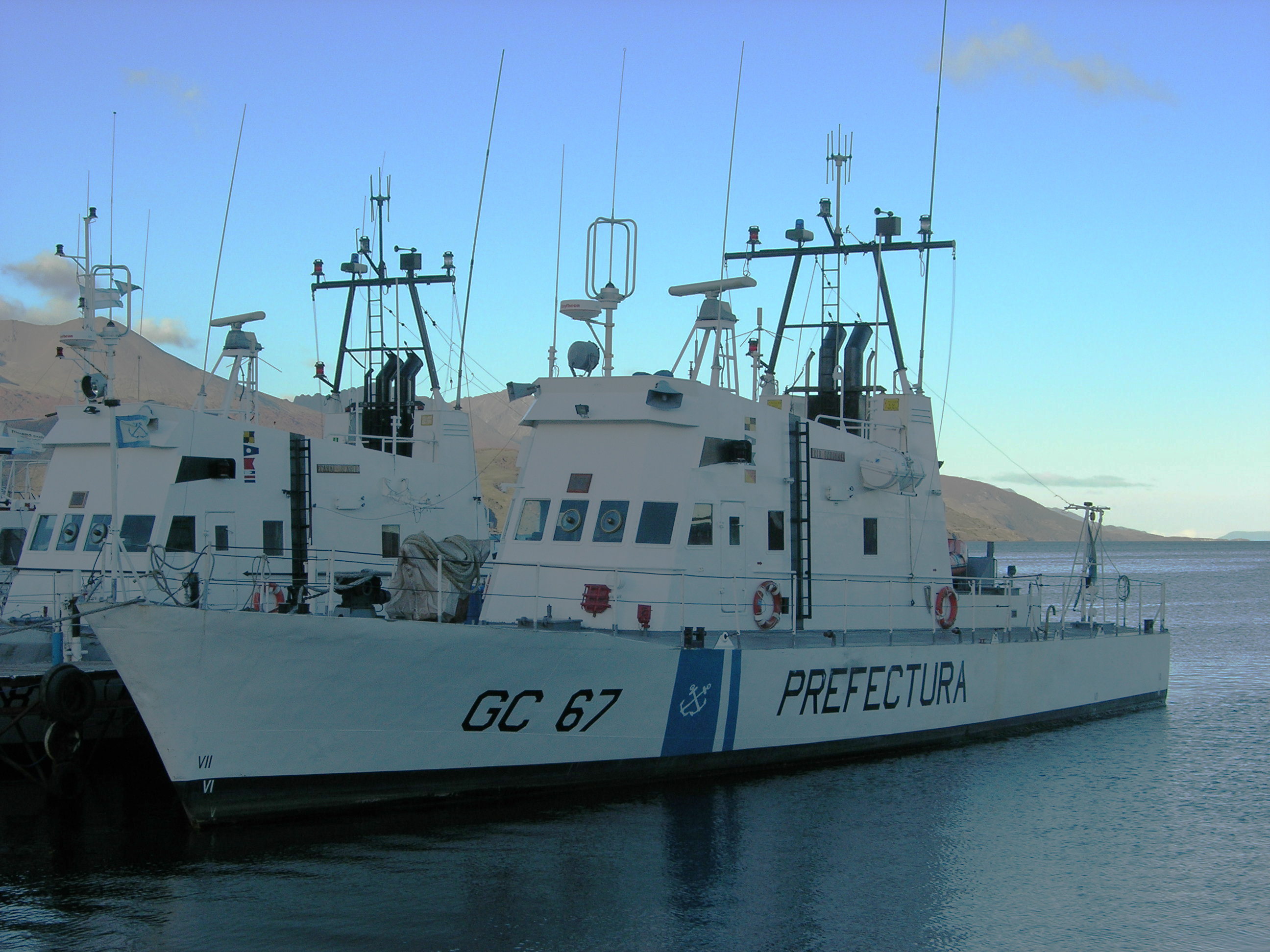
GC67 in Ushuaia

- Dirección General de Seguridad (Directorate-General of Security)
  - Dirección de Operaciones (Directorate of Operations)
  - Dirección de Policía de Seguridad de la Navegación (Directorate of Navigation Security Police)
  - Dirección de Policía Judicial, Protección Marítima y Puertos (Directorate of Judicial Police, Maritime Protection and Ports)
  - Dirección de Protección Ambiental (Directorate of Environmental Protection)
- Dirección General de Logística (Directorate-General of Logistics)
  - Dirección de Personal (Directorate of Personnel)
  - Dirección de Material (Directorate of Materiel)
  - Dirección de Educación (Directorate of Education)
  - Dirección de Administración Financiera (Directorate of Financial Administration)
  - Dirección de Bienestar (Directorate of Welfare)
- Dirección General de Planeamiento y Desarrollo (Directorate-General of Planning and Development)
  - Dirección de Planeamiento (Directorate of Planning)
  - Secretaría General (Secretariat-General; headed by the Secretary-General, a Prefecto Mayor)

=== Regions ===
The PNA is divided into ten zones:

- Alto Paraná (prefectures of Posadas, Iguazú, San Javier, Itá Ibaté, Ituzaingó, Libertador General San Martín, and Eldorado)
- Alto Uruguay
- Paraná Superior and Paraguay (prefectures of Corrientes, Formosa, Barranqueras, Pilcomayo, Reconquista, Goya, and Paso de la Patria e Itatí)
- Lower Uruguay (prefectures of Concepción del Uruguay, Gualeguaychú, Colón, Concordia, Salto Grande, and Federación)
- Lower Paraná
- Delta
- Río de la Plata
- North Argentine Sea
- South Argentine Sea
- Lacustre and Comahu

== Ranks ==
The highest rank of the service, Prefect-General, is held by both the National Naval Prefect and Deputy National Naval Prefect, as well as by many of the most senior officers of the prefecture, such as the heads of the different directorates of the national headquarters. While the rank itself equals that of Rear Admiral in the Argentine Navy, the National Naval Prefect and the Deputy National Naval Prefect titles are both equated to the ranks of Admiral and Vice Admiral, respectively, and wear corresponding insignia.

Officer ranks are as follows:

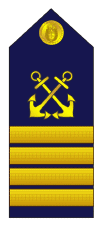
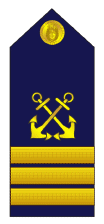
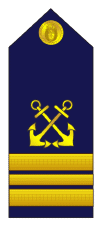
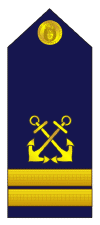
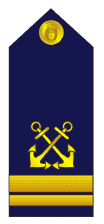
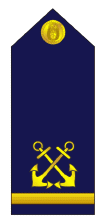
Rank group	General / flag officers			Senior officers			Junior officers
Argentine Naval Prefecture
Argentine Naval Prefecture	Prefecto General (Prefecto Nacional Naval)	Prefecto General (Subprefecto Nacional Naval)	Prefecto General	Prefecto Mayor	Prefecto Principal	Prefecto	Subprefecto	Oficial Principal	Oficial Auxiliar	Oficial Ayudante
Equivalent U.S. Coast Guard Rank	Vice admiral	Rear admiral	Rear admiral (lower half)	Captain	Commander	Lieutenant Commander	Lieutenant	Lieutenant (Junior Grade)	Ensign	No equivalent

The non-commissioned officer and enlisted ranks of the Prefecture are as follows:

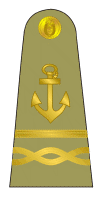
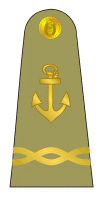
Rank group	Senior NCOs					Junior NCOs		Enlisted
Argentine Naval Prefecture
Argentine Naval Prefecture	Ayudante mayor	Ayudante principal	Ayudante de primero	Ayudante de segundo	Ayudante de tercera	Cabo primero	Cabo segundo	Marinero
Equivalent U.S. Coast Guard Rank	Master Chief Petty Officer	Senior Chief Petty Officer	Chief Petty Officer	Petty Officer First Class	Petty Officer Second Class	Petty Officer Third Class	Seaman	Seaman Apprentice

== Inventory ==
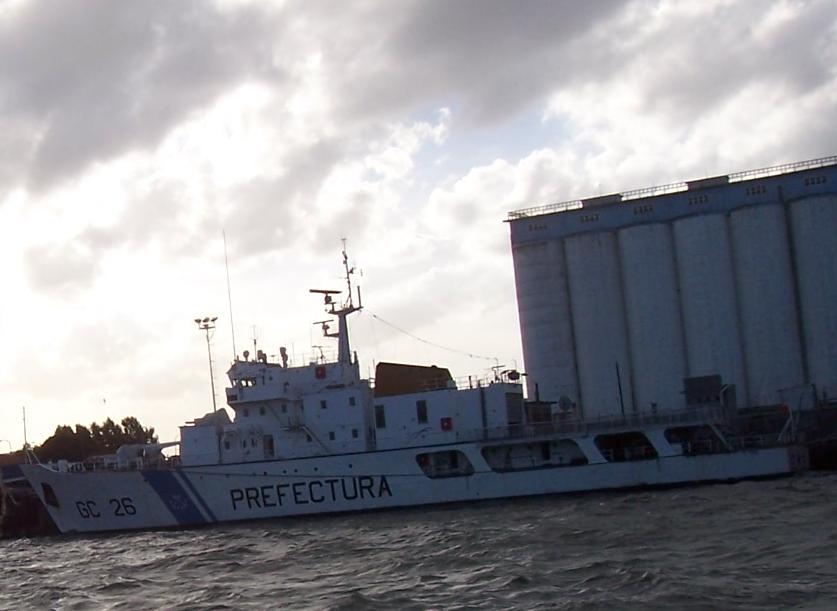
GC-26 at Mar del Plata.

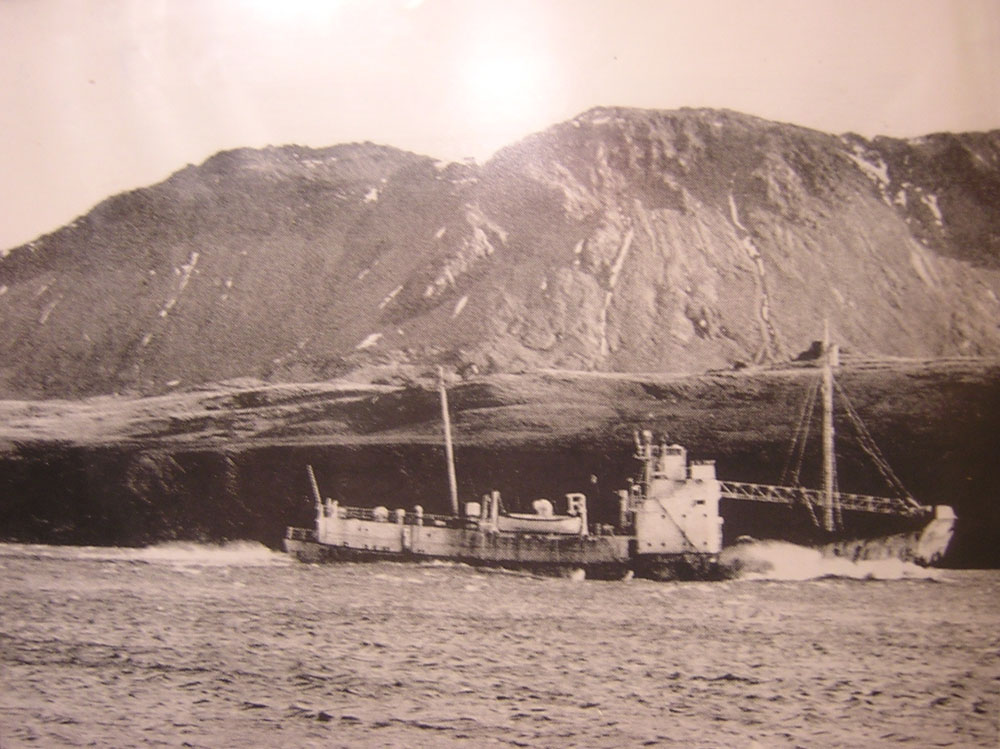
PNA Delfín

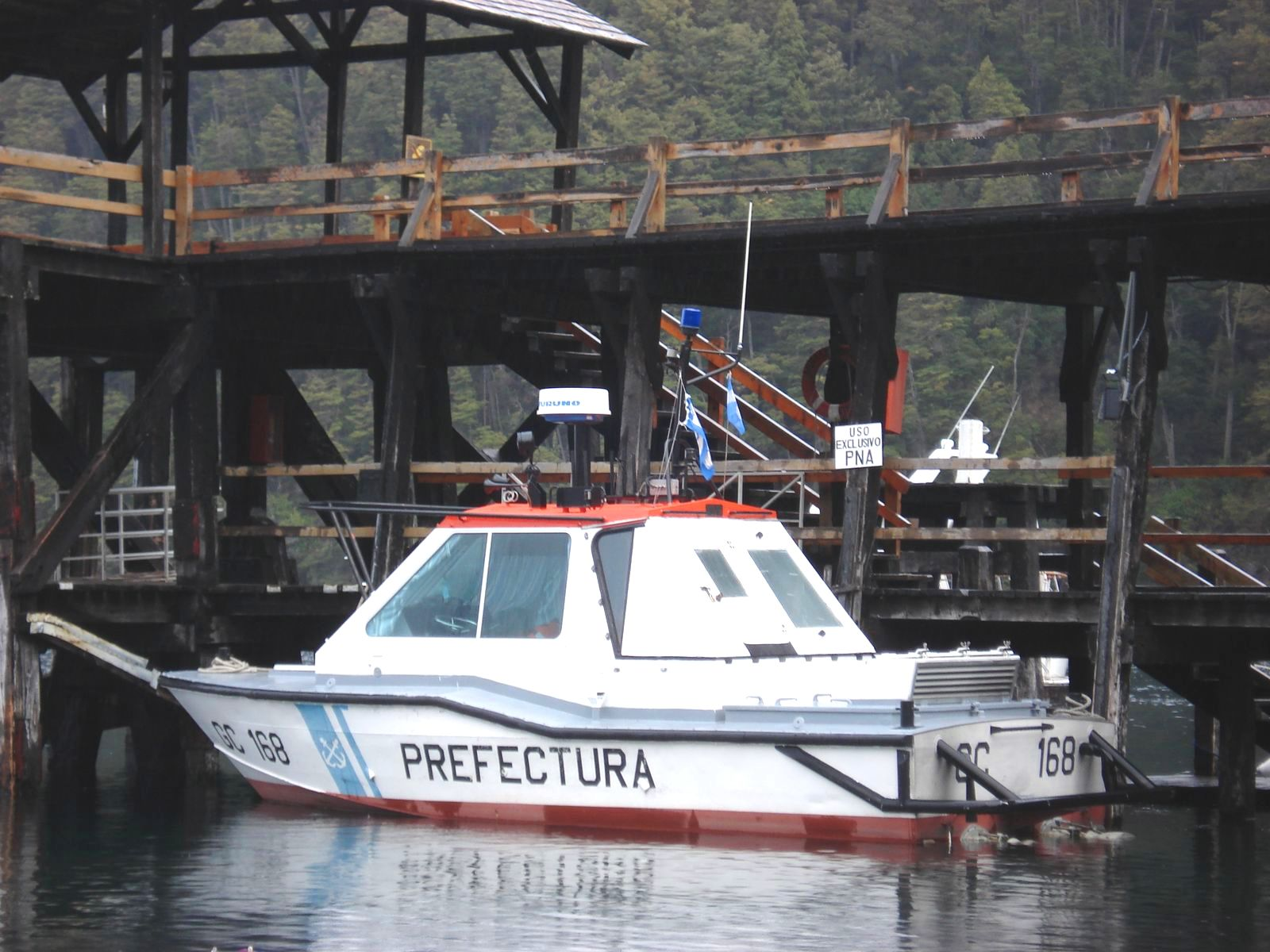
GC168 in Villa la Angostura

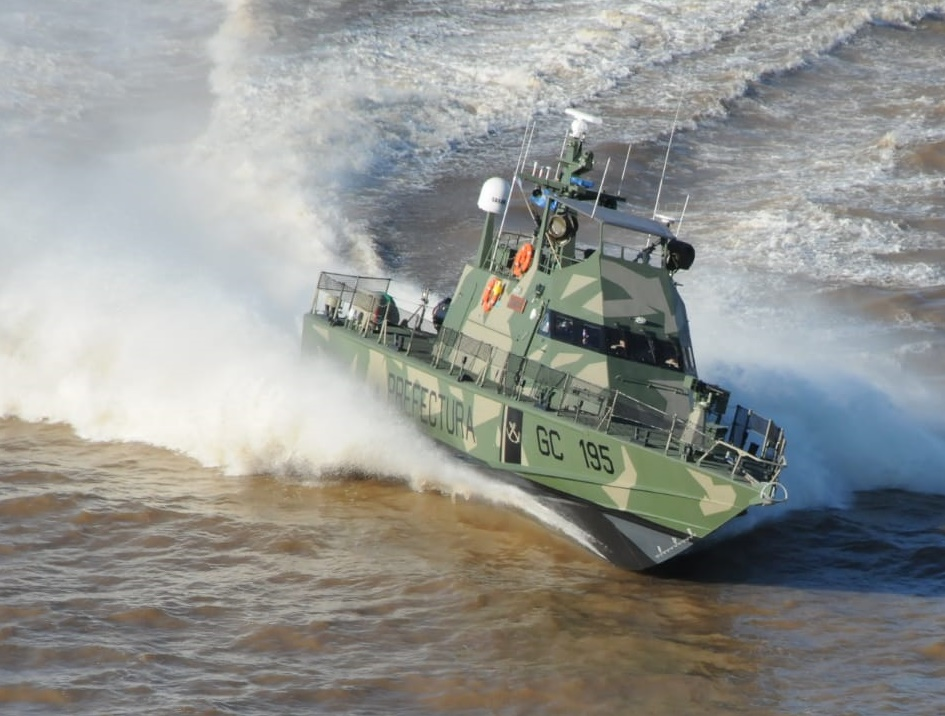
GC-195 Guaraní, Paraná River 2018

=== Main ships ===
==== Patrol vessels ====
The Argentine Naval Prefecture use the following ships for patrol purposes.

- Mantilla class (Halcón II class): 1,000 tons with helicopter deck built by Bazan (Ferrol), Spain
  - GC-24 PNA Doctor Manuel Mantilla
  - GC-25 PNA Azopardo
  - GC-26 PNA Thompson
  - GC-27 PNA Prefecto Fique
  - GC-28 PNA Prefecto Derbes
- GC-13 PNA Delfín, 700-ton patrol vessel
- Z-28 class: 81 tons built by Blohm + Voss, Germany
  - GC-64 to GC-83: Last two lost in Falklands War(GC-82 and 83)
  - GC-64 Mar del Plata
  - GC-65 Martin Garcia
  - GC-66 Rio Lujan
  - GC-67 Río Uruguay
  - GC-68 Rio Paraguay
  - GC-69 Río Paraná
  - GC-70 Río de la Plata
  - GC-71 La Plata
  - GC-72 Buenos Aires
  - GC-73 Cabo Corrientes
  - GC-74 Quequén
  - GC-75 Bahía Blanca
  - GC-76 Ingeniero White
  - GC-77 Golfo San Matías
  - GC-78 Madryn
  - GC-79 Río Deseado
  - GC-80 Ushuaia
  - GC-81 Canal Beagle
  - GC-82 Islas Malvinas
  - GC-83 Rio Iguazu
- Stan Tender 2200 class: 61 tons built by Damen, Netherlands
  - GC-122, 123, 124, 125, 129, 130, 150, 151
- Stan Tender 1750 class: 55 tons built by Damen, Netherlands
  - GC-118, 119, 133
- Damen Alucat 1050 class: 15 tons built by Damen, Netherlands
  - GC-137, 138, 139, 143, 144, 145, 146, 147, 148, 149
- Shaldag-class patrol boat MK II
  - GC-195 Guaraní
  - GC-196 Mataco
  - GC-197 Timbu
  - GC-198 Toba

At least other 50 vessels on the 8–15-ton range.

==== Other vessels ====
- PNA Dr. Bernardo Houssay (MOV1): 334 GRT Ketch rigged sail training and research vessel named for Dr Bernardo Houssay. She was originally built for Woods Hole Oceanographic Institution by Burmeister & Wain in 1930. She was acquired by CONICET in 1966 and was transferred to PNA in 1996.
- SB-15 Tango: salvage cutter. Former 635 GRT research/survey ship Seismic Surveyor (IMO 7048128), built 1969 in United States and purchased in 2005.
- DF-19 Recalada: former 17,707 GT Shell Argentina oil tanker Estrella Atlantica ex-Humberto Beghin, built 1982 in Argentina and purchased in 2011. Converting in Buenos Aires to a pilot boarding station. Tanker Estrella Austral will be similarly converted to pilot boarding station DF-20.

=== Aircraft ===
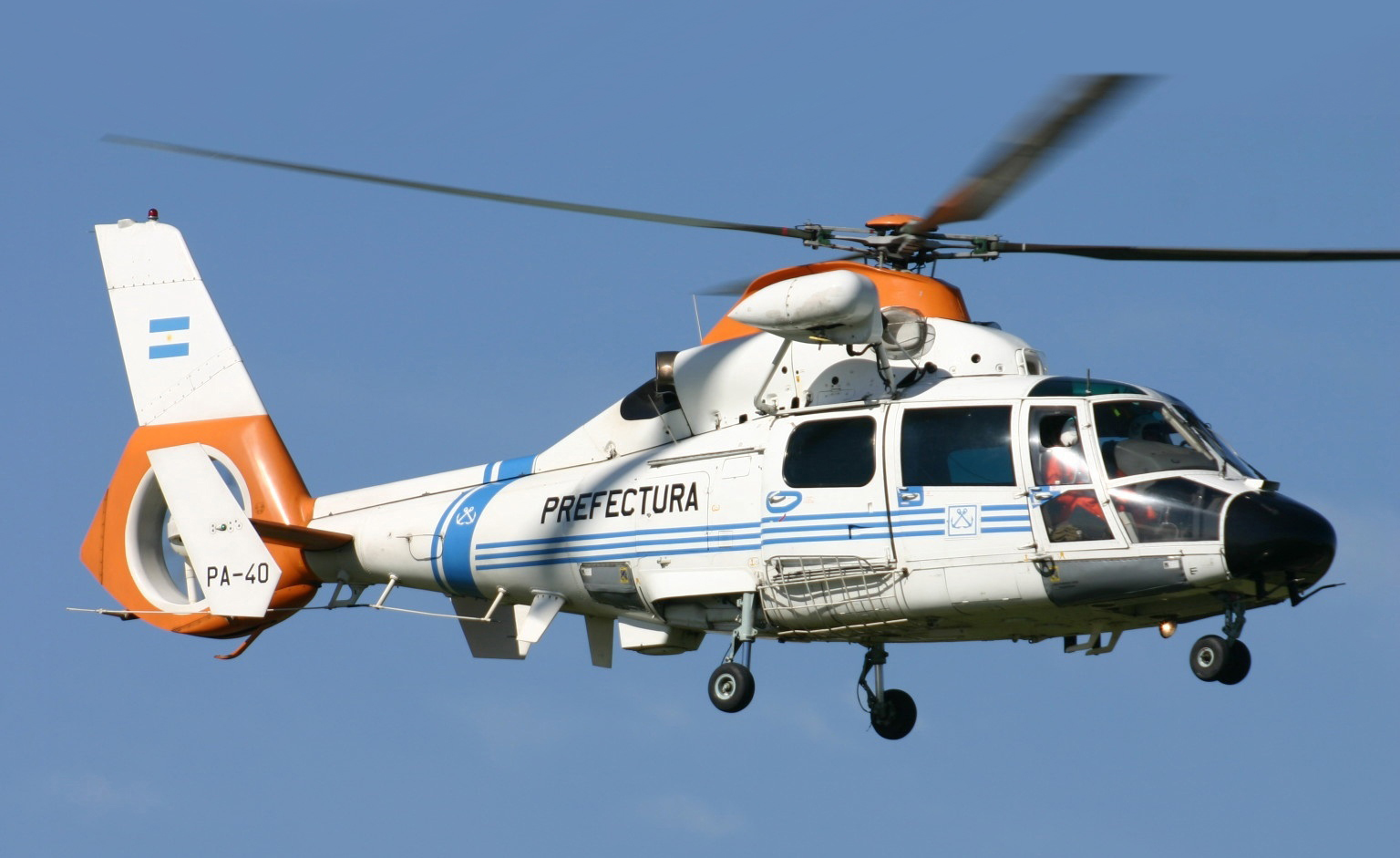
A Eurocopter AS365

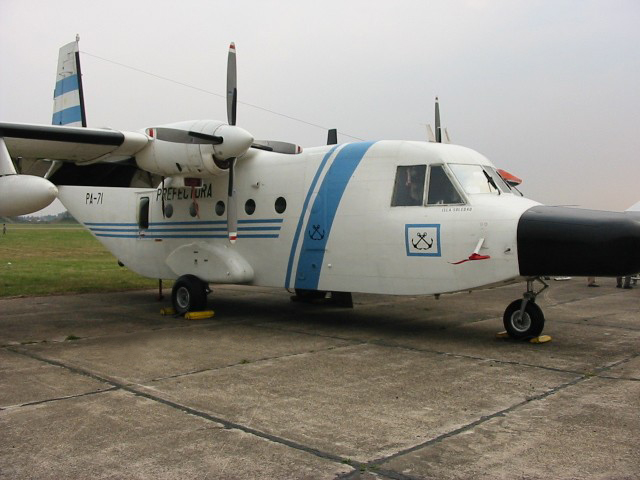
CASA 212 Aviocar

Aircraft	Origin	Type	Variant	In service	Notes
Transport
CASA C-212	Spain	maritime patrol		5	
Piper PA-28	United States	utility		2	
Beechcraft King Air	United States	transport	350	1	
Helicopters
Schweizer 300	United States	patrol		7	
Eurocopter AS355	France	utility		2	
Eurocopter AS365	France	SAR	365 N2	4	
Eurocopter EC225	France	SAR / transport	EC225LP	2	

==== Former aircraft ====
Previous helicopters operated by the Coast Guard were the Aérospatiale Puma (3), Hughes 369 (6), Bell 47J (5), and the Sikorsky H-5 (1). Previous fixed-wing types include Grumman G-21 Goose (6), de havilland DH.104 Dove (2), Nord 1203 Norécrin (4), Douglas C-47 (2), Short SC.7 Skyvan (5)

=== Firearms ===
Model	Origin	Type	Caliber	Notes
Beretta 92	Italy	Pistol	9×19mm	Service pistol
Bersa TPR9	Argentina	Pistol	9×19mm	
Heckler & Koch MP5	Germany	Submachine gun	9×19mm	
FN FAL	Argentina	Battle rifle	7.62×51mm	Service rifle
SIG SG550	Switzerland	Assault rifle	5.56×45mm	Used by Grupo Albatros
IWI X95	Israel	Assault rifle	5.56×45mm	Used by Grupo Albatros
FN MAG	Belgium	Machine gun	7.62×51mm	
Benelli M3	Italy	Shotgun	12 gauge	
Franchi SPAS-15	Italy	Shotgun	12 gauge	Used by Grupo Albatros
SIG Sauer SSG 3000	Switzerland	Sniper rifle	7.62×51mm	Used by Grupo Albatros

== See also ==
- Argentine Federal Police
- Argentine National Gendarmerie
- Buenos Aires Provincial Police
- Santa Fe Provincial Police
- Interior Security System
- Sinking of the Chian-der 3
