= Deluge gun =

Firefighting equipment

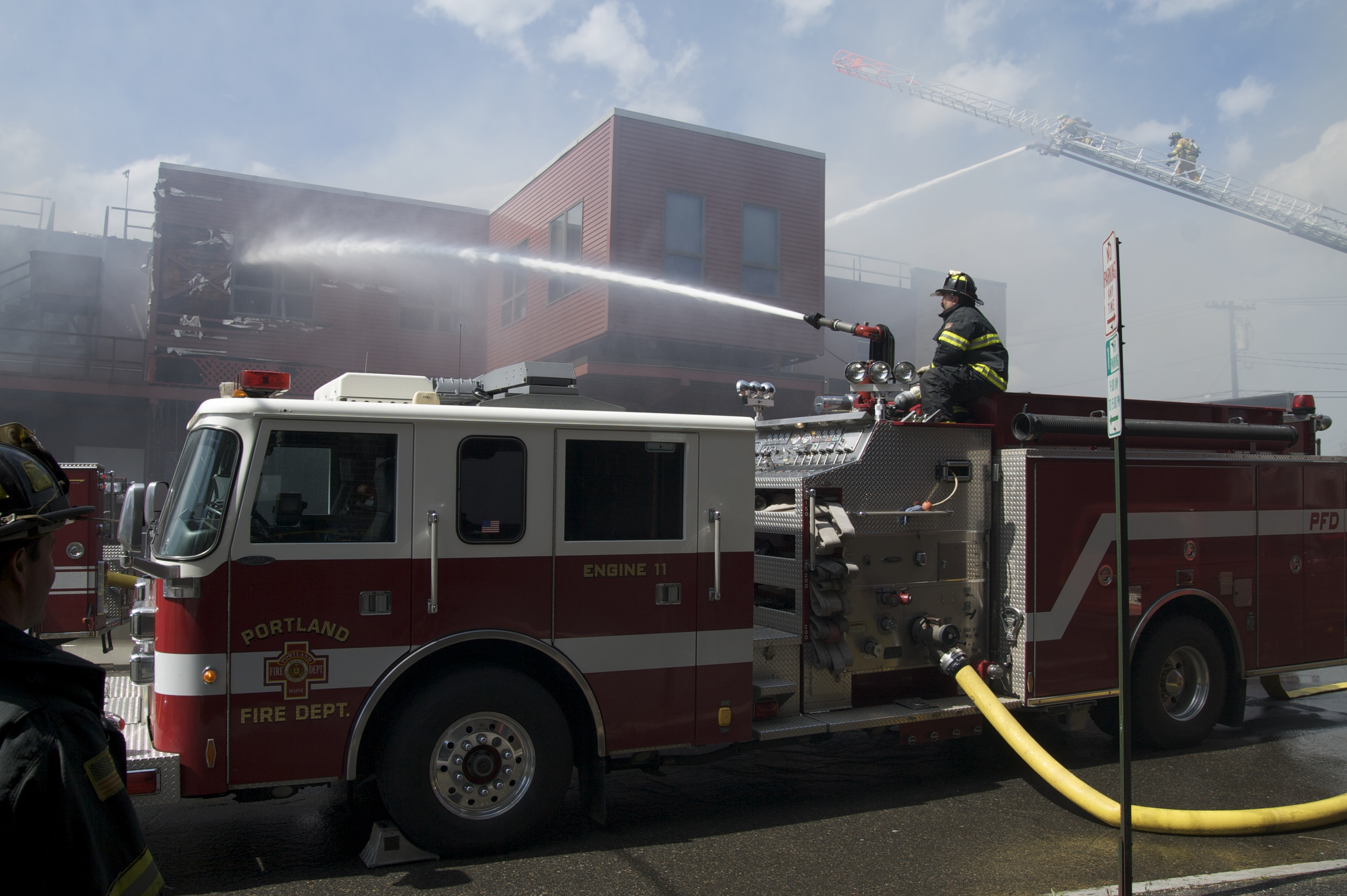
A deck gun in the foreground puts water through a window while a ladder-mounted master stream in the background directs water through the collapsed roof.

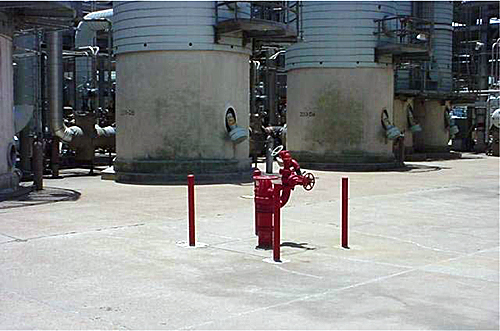
Fixed fire monitor at a plastic manufacturing factory

A deluge gun, fire monitor, master stream or deck gun is an aimable, controllable high-capacity water jet used for manual firefighting or automatic fire protection systems. Deluge guns are often designed to accommodate foam that has been injected into the upstream piping.

== Installation ==
Deluge guns are often fitted to fire boats, tug boats, and atop large fire trucks for use in manual firefighting, where they can be aimed and operated by one firefighter and are used to deliver water or foam from outside the immediate area of the fire. Deluge guns are sometimes installed in fixed fire protection systems to protect high hazards, such as aviation hangars and helicopter landing pads. Similarly, facilities with highly flammable material such as oil refineries may have permanently-installed deluge guns. Most apparatus-mounted deluge guns can be directed by a single firefighter, compared to a standard fire hose that normally requires several. Deluge guns can be automatically positioned for fixed systems or may have portable designs. The latter option enables a firefighter to set up the gun to apply water to a blaze, before leaving it in place to attend to other tasks.

== Capacity ==
A deluge gun can discharge 7,500 litres per minute (1,981 US gal/min; 125 L/s) or more. A master stream is a fire service term for a water stream of 1,250 litres per minute (330 US gal/min; 21 L/s) or greater. It is delivered by a master stream device, such as a deck gun, deluge gun, or fire monitor. Master streams are often found at the end of aerial ladders, tele-squirt nozzles, or monitor nozzles. The high pressure that they require renders them unsuitable for handline use. As of the mid-2020s, the highest flow capacity reported for a fire monitor worldwide is approximately 80,000 litres per minute (about 21,100 US gal/min), achieved by a transportable industrial monitor trailer manufactured by Fire Fighting Systems (FFS) for large-scale refinery and petrochemical fire protection.

== Risks ==
A master stream brings with it many risks when used in an urban setting. A master stream should never be fired into an occupied building, as the force could knock down a supporting wall and crush victims. Also, the steam from the high volume of water delivered could cause a blowout or displace oxygen from an enclosed area, creating a risk of asphyxiation.

== See also ==
- Standpipe (firefighting)
- Water cannon
- Water gun
- Water salutes, often carried out with deluge guns
