= Empresa Nacional Bazán =

Spanish shipbuilding company

- Empresa Nacional Bazán de Construcciones Navales Militares, S. A.
- Formation: July 11, 1947
- Type: public company
- Headquarters: Spain
- Products: military vessels, civilian vessels, engines and turbines
- Services: Shipbuilding
- Website: www.navantia.es

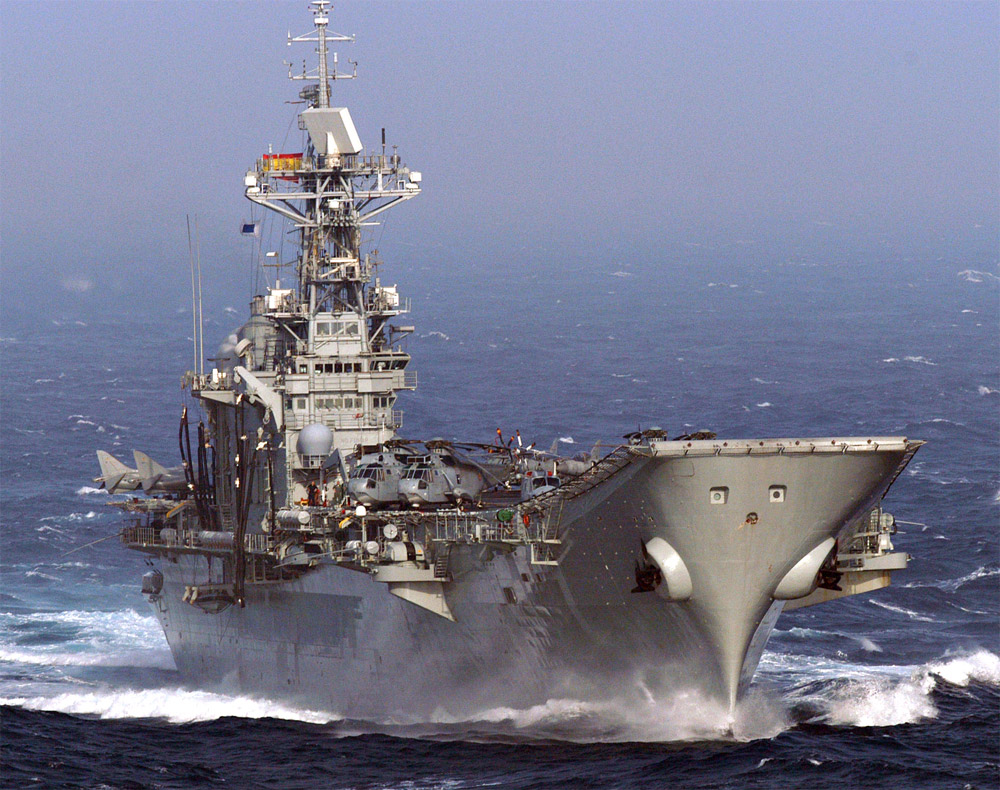
Aircraft carrier Príncipe de Asturias, the most important project undertaken by Bazán.

Empresa Nacional Bazán de Construcciones Navales Militares, S.A. was a Spanish public company founded on July 11, 1947, at the initiative of the National Institute of Industry (INI). It was primarily dedicated to military shipbuilding, although it also constructed numerous civilian vessels and operated an equipment division that manufactured engines and turbines. In 1988, the company delivered the aircraft carrier [[Spanish aircraft carrier Príncipe de Asturias|Príncipe de Asturias]] to the Spanish Navy, its most significant project. Bazán operated shipyards in Ferrol, Cartagena, and San Fernando. In 2000, Bazán merged with Astilleros Españoles (AESA), which encompassed Spain's exclusively civilian public shipyards and operated facilities in Fene, Gijón, Manises, Puerto Real, Sestao, and Seville, resulting in the creation of IZAR. In 2005, another restructuring of the sector led to the formation of the current company, Navantia, following the separation and subsequent privatization of the shipyards in Gijón, Seville, Manises, and Sestao.

== Ships built by Bazán ==
Empresa Nacional Bazán delivered the following ships from its founding in 1947 until the creation of IZAR in June 2000.

=== Military vessels ===
- Spanish Navy
  - 1 Aircraft carrier Príncipe de Asturias (R-11) (Ferrol)
  - 2 Galicia-class LPD vessels (Ferrol)
  - 3 Type K landing barges (Ferrol)
  - 2 Liniers-class destroyers (Cartagena)
  - 9 Audaz-class destroyers (Ferrol)
  - 3 Oquendo-class destroyers (Ferrol and Cartagena)
  - 6 Santa María-class frigates (Ferrol)
  - 5 Baleares-class frigates (Ferrol)
  - 8 Pizarro-class frigates (Ferrol)
  - 6 Descubierta-class corvettes (1978) (Ferrol and Cartagena)
  - 6 Descubierta-class corvettes (1955) (Cartagena and San Fernando)
  - 1 Combat supply ship Patiño (A-14) (Ferrol)
  - 1 Fleet oiler Marqués de la Ensenada (A-11) (Ferrol)
  - 1 Fleet oiler Teide (A-11) (Cartagena)
  - 2 Foca-class midget submarines (Cartagena)
  - 2 Tiburón-class midget submarines (Cartagena)
  - 3 D-class submarines (Cartagena)
  - 4 Delfín-class submarines (Cartagena)
  - 4 Galerna-class submarines (Cartagena)
  - 1 Oceanographic research vessel Hespérides (A-33) (Cartagena)
  - 4 Serviola-class OPV coast guard vessels (Ferrol)
  - 5 Barceló-class patrol boats (San Fernando)
  - 10 Anaga-class patrol boats (San Fernando)
  - 6 Lazaga-class patrol boats (San Fernando)
  - 4 Conejera-class patrol boats (Ferrol)
  - 2 Rigel-class patrol boats (Ferrol)
  - 2 Cíes-class patrol boats (Ferrol)
  - 2 Centinela-class patrol boats (Ferrol)
  - 1 Patrol vessel Cormorán (P-41) (Ferrol)
  - 1 Azor (A-91) (Ferrol)
  - 1 Tugboat, later converted into the rescue ship Poseidón (A-12) (La Carraca)
  - 4 Segura-class mine countermeasure vessels (Cartagena)
  - 7 Bidasoa-class minesweepers (Cartagena)
  - 7 Guadiaro-class minesweepers (Cartagena)
  - 6 S-38-class Schnellboote (San Fernando)
  - 2 YRR-21-type tugboats (San Fernando)
  - 2 Malaspina-class hydrographic vessels (San Fernando)
  - 2 Antares-class hydrographic vessels (San Fernando)
- Portuguese Navy
  - 3 corvettes class João Coutinho (San Fernando)
  - 4 corvettes class Baptista de Andrade (Ferrol)
- Thailand Royal Thai Navy
  - 1 Aircraft carrier HTMS Chakri Naruebet (Ferrol)
- Mexico Mexican Navy
  - 6 Uribe-class OPV patrol vessels (San Fernando)
- Argentina Argentine Naval Prefecture
  - 5 Mantilla-class OPV patrol vessels (Ferrol)
- Venezuela Venezuelan Navy
  - 1 Oceanographic vessel ARBV Punta Brava (BO-11) (San Fernando)
- Morocco Royal Moroccan Navy
  - 1 Descubierta-class corvette, Teniente Coronel Errahmani (F-501) (Ferrol)
  - 4 Lazaga-class patrol vessels (San Fernando)
  - 4 Vigilance-class patrol vessels (San Fernando)
- Egypt Egyptian Navy
  - 2 Descubierta-class corvettes (Ferrol)
- Chile Chilean Navy
  - 1 Training ship Esmeralda (Cádiz)
  - 4 Barceló-class torpedo boats (San Fernando)
- Mauritania Mauritanian Navy
  - 3 Barceló-class patrol vessels (San Fernando)
- Republic of the Congo Congolese Navy
  - 3 Barceló-class patrol vessels (San Fernando)
- Tunisia Tunisian Navy
  - 1 Barceló-class patrol vessel (formerly Javier Quiroga (P-13) of the Spanish Navy)
- Colombia Colombian Navy
  - 2 Lazaga-class patrol vessels (formerly Cardasó (P-03) and Reclade (P-06) of the Spanish Navy)
  - 1 Patrol vessel Espartana (PO-41) (formerly Cormorán (P-41) of the Spanish Navy)
- Senegal Senegalese Navy
  - 1 Conejera-class patrol vessel (formerly Conejera (P-31) of the Spanish Navy)
- Mozambique Mozambican Navy
  - 1 Conejera-class patrol vessel (formerly Dragonera (P-32) of the Spanish Navy)

=== Civilian vessels ===
- Almirante F. Moreno (1954), 14,000 dwt tanker (Ferrol)
- Almirante M. Vierna (1955), 14,000 dwt tanker (Ferrol)
- Puertollano (1955), 18,410 dwt tanker (Ferrol)
- P.G. Rodríguez (1956), 18,410 dwt tanker (Ferrol)
- Valmaseda (1957), 19,250 dwt tanker (Ferrol)
- Durango (1958), 19,250 dwt tanker (Ferrol)
- Bilbao (1962), 33,625 dwt tanker (Ferrol)
- Guernica (1962), 33,625 dwt tanker (Ferrol)
- Tintore (1968), 8,130-ton cargo ship (Ferrol)
- Compostilla (1959), 19,250 dwt tanker for Campsa (Ferrol)
- Ribagorzana (1959), 19,250 dwt tanker for Campsa (Ferrol)
- SAC Barcelona (1963), cargo ship
- Ingeniero Hermite (1967), 19,929 dwt tanker (Ferrol)
- G Martín Güemes (1967), 19,929 dwt tanker (Ferrol)
- Sardinero (1967), 69,949-ton tanker (Ferrol)
- Marquina (1967), 65,000 dwt tanker (Ferrol)
- Esso Castellón (1968), 77,459 dwt tanker (Ferrol)
- Álvaro de Bazán (1972), 169,000 dwt tanker (Ferrol)
- Inca-Roca (1969), 18,300-ton cargo ship (Ferrol)
- Logatec (1969), 14,400-ton cargo ship (Ferrol)
- Litija (1969), 14,400-ton cargo ship (Ferrol)
- Campurdan (1971), 10,400 gross register ton liquid bulk carrier for Campsa (Cartagena)
- Campobierzo (1971), 10,400 gross register ton liquid bulk carrier for Campsa (Cartagena)
- Campocriptana (1971), 10,400 gross register ton liquid bulk carrier for Campsa (San Fernando)
- Camporioja (1971), 10,400 gross register ton liquid bulk carrier for Campsa (San Fernando)
- Castillo de la Mota (1971), 64,070-ton bulk carrier (Ferrol)
- Presidente Rivera (1971), 30,000 dwt tanker (Ferrol)
- Río Acucan (1973), 14,480-ton cargo ship (Ferrol)
- Río Pilcomayo (1973), 14,480-ton cargo ship (Ferrol)
- Filiara Legacy (later Spirit of Phoenix) (1975), 143,600-ton OBO carrier (Ferrol)
- Belén (1973), 12,389-ton fast cargo ship (San Fernando)
- Paloma del Mar (1973), 141,463-ton OBO carrier (Ferrol)
- Castillo de Lorca (1975), 172,000 dwt tanker (Ferrol)
- A Rotaeche (1976), 172,000 dwt tanker (Ferrol)
- Gerona (1976), 172,000 dwt tanker (Ferrol)
- Eulalia del Mar (1974), 141,465-ton OBO carrier (Ferrol)
- Snestad (1974), 143,867-ton OBO carrier (Ferrol)
- Castillo de Montearagón, 172,000 dwt tanker (Ferrol)
- Valencia (1977), 172,000 dwt tanker (Ferrol)
- Lérida (1978), 172,000 dwt tanker (Ferrol)
- Campodola (1976), 35,000 dwt tanker for Campsa (Ferrol)
- Calvosotelo (later Camponubla) (1977), 35,000 dwt tanker for Campsa (Ferrol)
- Entrerios II (1977), 12,762 gross register ton cargo ship (San Fernando)
- Santa Fe (1977), 12,865 gross register ton cargo ship (San Fernando)
- Formosa (1978), 12,762 gross register ton container ship (San Fernando)
- Puertollano (Empetrol) (1978), 172,000 dwt tanker (Ferrol)
- 8 Cartago-type cargo ships of 15,000 dwt (Ferrol)
- Argos (1983), 103,000 dwt bulk carrier (Ferrol)
- Castillo de Montearagón (1984), 159,000 dwt tanker (Ferrol)
- Castillo de Lopera (1984), 154,000 dwt bulk carrier (Ferrol)
- Castillo de Lorca (1984), 159,000 dwt tanker (Ferrol)
- Castillo de La Luz (1984), 154,000 dwt bulk carrier (Ferrol)

== See also ==
- El año del descubrimiento
