= Law enforcement in Argentina =

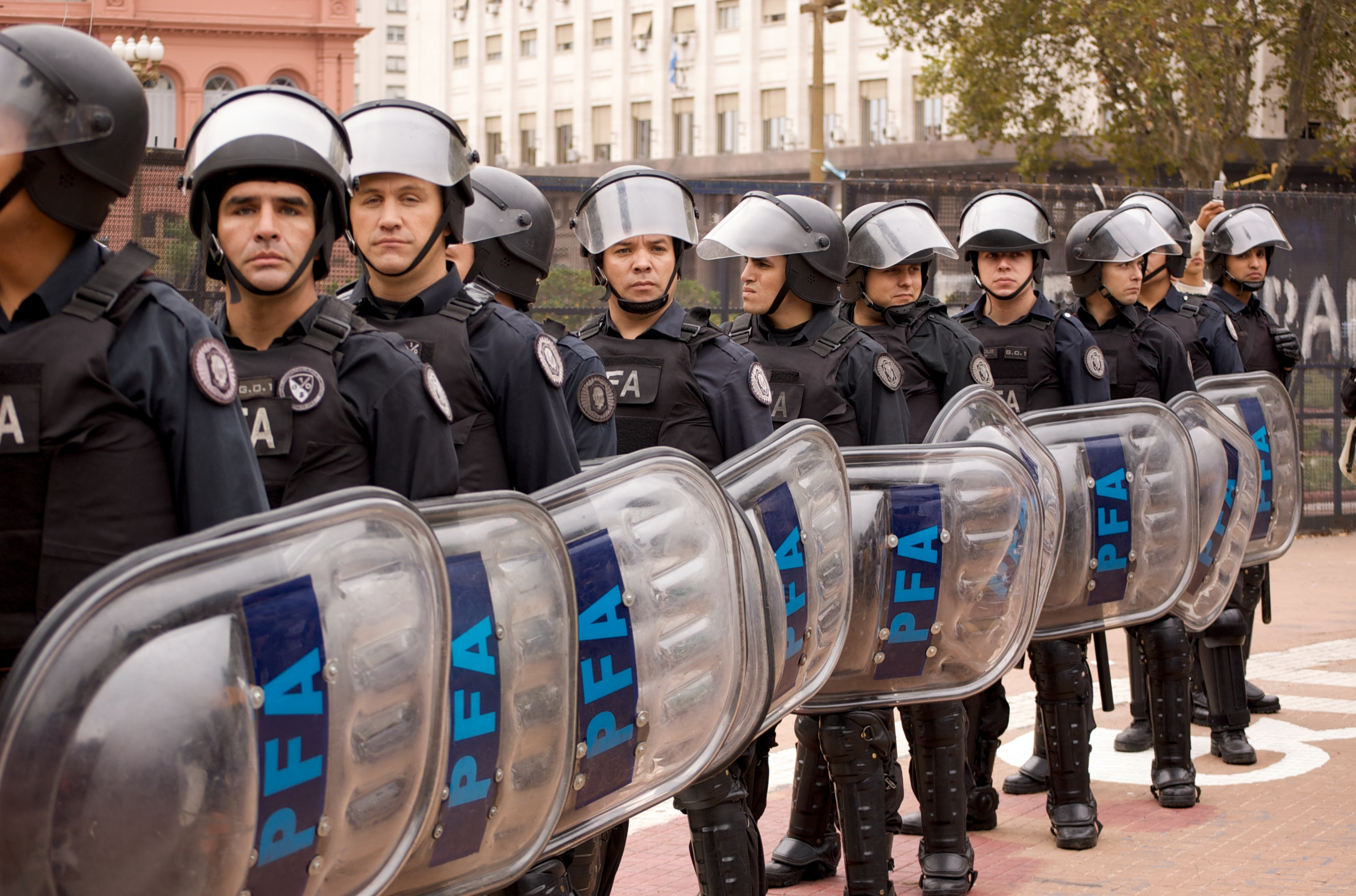
Federal officers during the 2008 Olympic Torch Relay in Buenos Aires

In Argentina, the most important law enforcement organization is the Argentine Federal Police with jurisdiction in all Argentine territory. Most routine police work is carried out by provincial/state police forces. In recent years, several cities (such as Saldan and Villa Allende) started their own local police forces to reduce the burden on the State Police. The capital city of Buenos Aires (a federal district), where the Argentine Federal Police works with Argentine Naval Prefecture (Coast Guard) and Buenos Aires City Police (Municipal police).

== Federal agencies ==
- Argentine Federal Police
- Argentine National Gendarmerie
- Argentine Naval Prefecture
- Airport Security Police
- Federal Penitentiary Service

== Provincial Police Forces ==
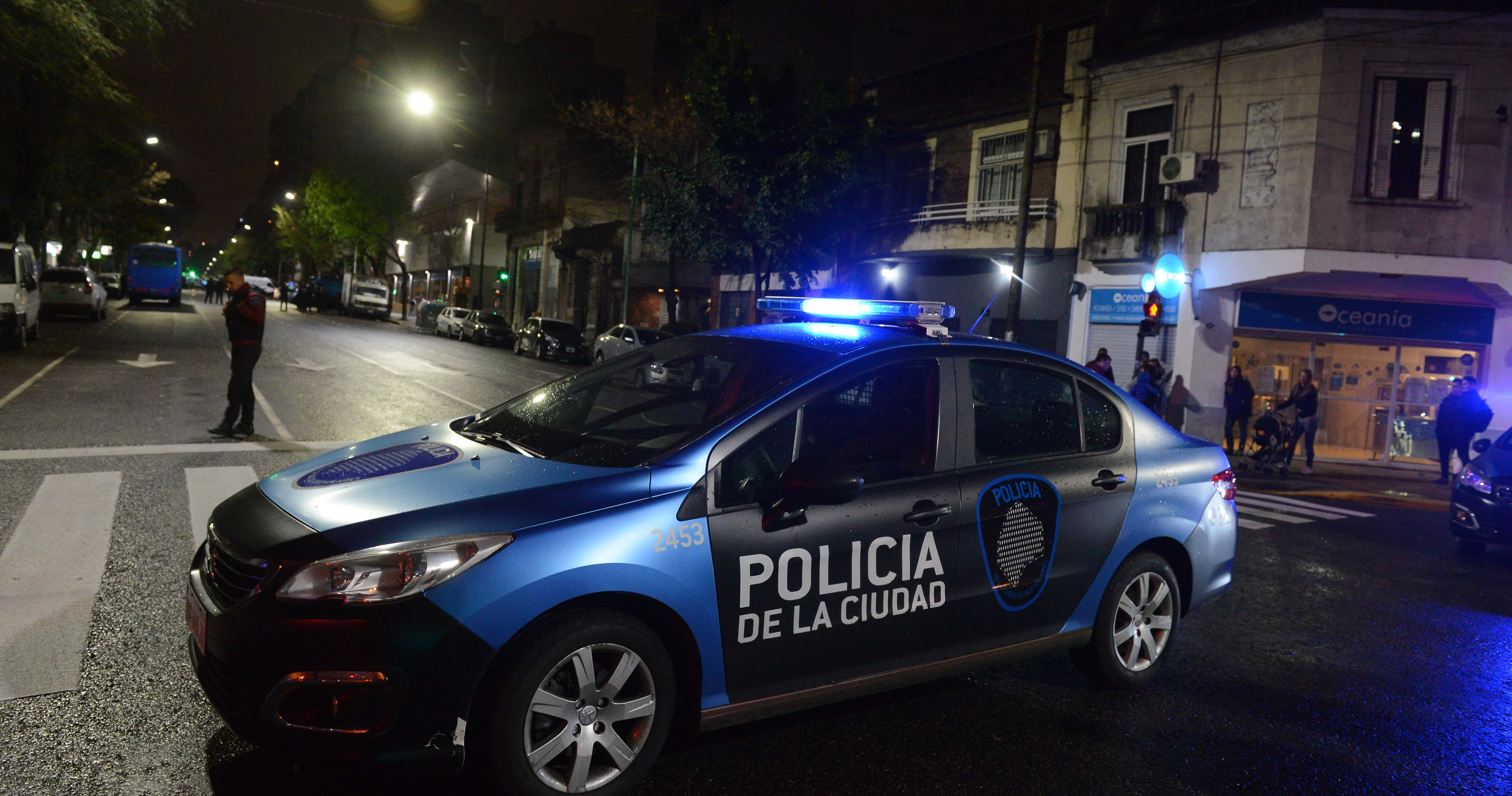
Police in Buenos Aires

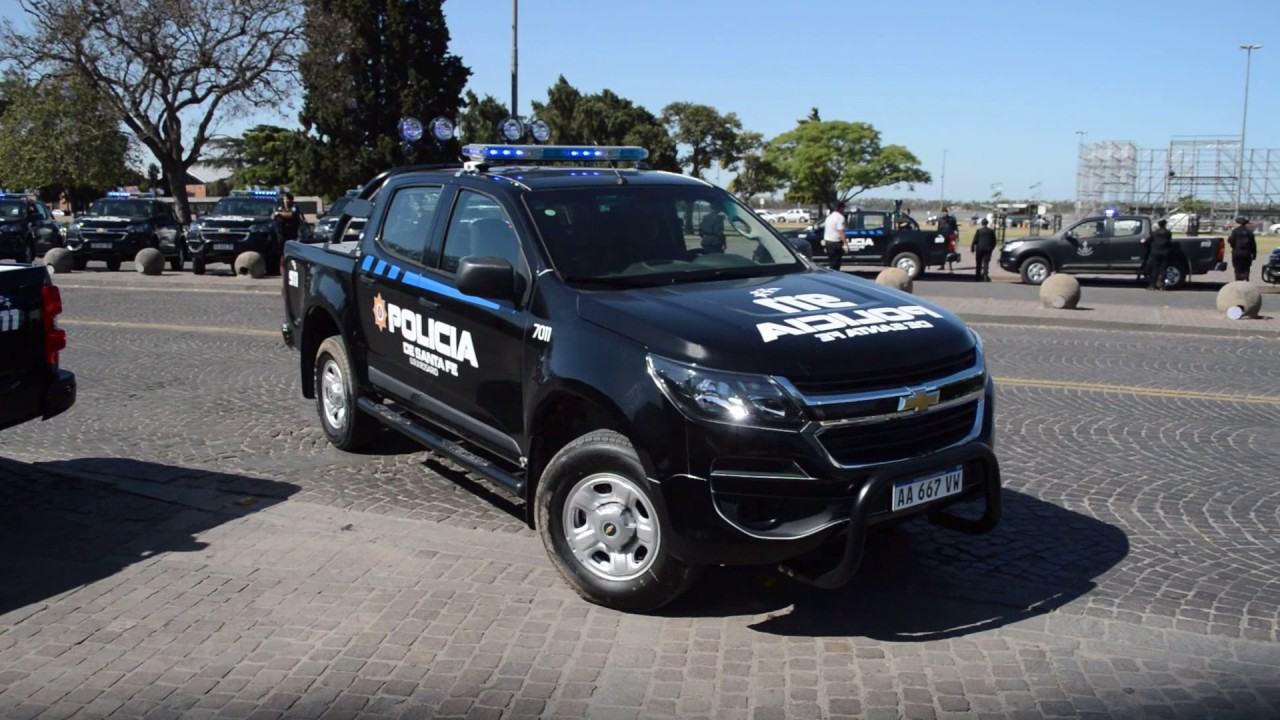
Provincial Police of Santa Fe

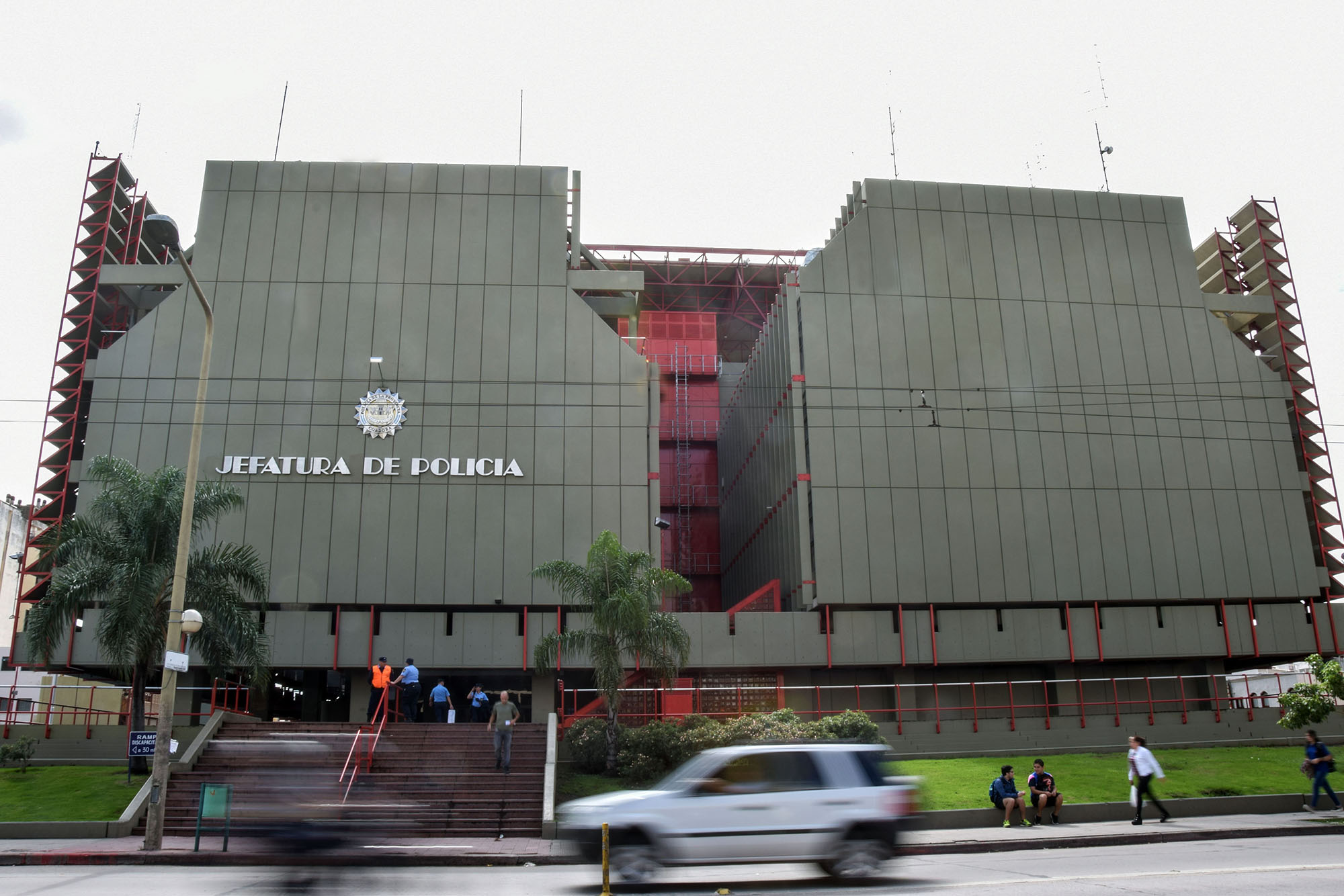
Provincial Police of Córdoba

- Buenos Aires Provincial Police
- Catamarca Provincial Police
- Chaco Provincial Police
- Chubut Provincial Police
- Córdoba Provincial Police
- Corrientes Provincial Police
- Entre Ríos Provincial Police
- Formosa Provincial Police
- Jujuy Provincial Police
- La Pampa Provincial Police
- La Rioja Provincial Police
- Mendoza Provincial Police
- Misiones Provincial Police
- Neuquén Provincial Police
- Río Negro Provincial Police
- Salta Provincial Police
- San Juan Provincial Police
- San Luis Provincial Police
- Santa Cruz Provincial Police
- Santa Fe Provincial Police
- Santiago del Estero Provincial Police
- Tierra del Fuego Provincial Police
- Tucumán Provincial Police

== Local Forces ==
- Buenos Aires City Police
- Lomas de Zamora City Police
- Villa Allende City Police
- Saldan City Police
- Córdoba Municipal Police

== Tactical Forces ==
- Hawk Special Operations Brigade
- Special Operations Troops Company
- Infantry Guard Corps
- Escorpion Group
- Albatross Group
- Federal Special Operations Group
- Special Group One

== Intelligence agencies ==
- Intelligence Secretariat
- Argentine Federal Police Intelligence
- Argentine National Gendarmerie Intelligence
- Argentine Naval Prefecture Intelligence
- Airport Security Police Intelligence
- Federal Penitentiary Service Intelligence
- Inteligencia de la Policía Bonaerense

== Historical secret police organizations ==
- Sociedad Popular Restauradora ("Mazorca")
- Sección Especial de Represión al Comunismo (SERC) (Special Section for the Repression of Communism)
- División de Información Política Antidemocrática (DIPA) (Political Anti-democratic Information Division)

== Corruption ==
Corruption is a pervasive and widespread practice among police agents in Argentina. It’s hard to know with precision the extent of corruption within Argentine law enforcement. Corruption is difficult to measure because most of it is never discovered and/or is not reported. However, there are some numbers that can indicate the extent of the problem in Argentina. In 2008, there were 120 investigations against police officers in relation to allegations of corruption and criminal involvement.

In the Buenos Aires Provincial Police force alone, there were 13,619 police officers investigated for acts of corruption, violence, and/or irregularities between 2008 and 2009 according to the General Auditing Office of Internal Affairs. Global Integrity ranks Argentine law enforcement as weak on anti-corruption performance with a score of 63 over 100. Likewise, Transparency International (TI)’s Bribe Payers Index 2008 gives the Argentine police a score of 3.9 on a 5-point scale, 1 being 'not at all corrupt' and 5 'extremely corrupt.'

The most common form of corruption practiced in Argentina by police agents is the request of a bribe or the acceptance of a bribe offered by citizens who committed a traffic violation or any ordinary infringement of the law in order to avoid legal penalties. According to Barómetro de las Américas done by the Latin American Public Opinion Project, in Argentina, 15% of the population has been asked for a bribe by a police agent. This finding is backed by the Latinobarómetro 2008, which found that 59% of Argentines believe that it is possible to bribe a policeman in order to avoid a fine or arrest.

There is also strong evidence that police agents act in connivance with criminals. In exchange for a percentage of the proceeds from criminal activities, police officers facilitate “freed zones” –where police officers do not go in- for thieves to be able to carry out robberies or kidnappings, or for drug dealers to be able to sell drugs. In other words, it is a common practice for criminals in Argentina to operate under protection of the police. In addition, law enforcement officers are known to be involved in organized criminal activities. According to Freedom House 2010, Buenos Aires police has been involved in several incidents of drug trafficking and extortion. Police officers are also involved in arms trafficking. Police arms depots or warehouses function as a source of weapons for the black market.

=== Dynamics ===
Police corruption in Argentina is due to several factors. In the first place, poor salaries are an incentive towards petty corruption within the police. Similarly, budget constraints affect the police's ability to carry out their mandate, decreasing morale and commitment towards their mission within the law enforcement institution. These factors reinforce an already existing and widespread tolerance for corruption, which fuels this illegal practice. Moreover, a high rate of impunity for police corruption fails to act as a deterrent against this practice. Criminal proceedings against police officers are generally avoided because of a lack of resources or the lack of will to investigate police corruption cases. Lastly, the Argentine law enforcement lacks mechanisms for transparency and accountability, rendering the police force a very hard institution to control.

The most deleterious effect of police corruption is the inefficacy of law enforcement to fight crime. According to an investigation by La Nación, the police force in Argentina has only been able to capture 32% of the alleged perpetrators of the most heinous crimes committed between July and August 2010. This incompetence has a direct correlation to the growing levels of crime found in Argentina. At the same time, it causes police forces to be less trusted by its citizens. In fact, the World Economic Forum’s Global Competitiveness Report 2010-2011 indicates that the reliability of the Argentine police services to enforce law and order achieves a score of 3.0 on a 7-point scale, 1 being 'cannot be relied upon at all' and 7 'can always be relied upon.'

Another serious consequence brought about by police corruption is its contribution to the deep weakening of the rule of law in Argentina. If the police force fails to carry out its mission and loses the citizens’ trust and respect, its power of deterrence against illegal acts is lost, promoting the violation of laws by its own citizens, in addition to encouraging crime. In the end, this also drives citizens to stop reporting crimes because of their lack of trust and respect for law enforcement. For all these reasons, Argentines consider the police force to be one of the most corrupt institutions in the country. Most citizens in the country defend themselves from criminals acts with weapons like pistols rather than informing the police about the criminal acts in the country.

With the recent creation of the Buenos Aires Metropolitan Police in 2009, an increasing number of city residences have opted to report crimes to the Metropolitan Police instead of the Federal Police due to its corruption problems.

== See also ==
- 2013 police revolts in Argentina
- Crime in Argentina
