= Halcon =

Halcon or Halcones may refer to:

== People ==
- Pequeño Halcón (aka Rogelio Espinoza López), Mexican masked wrestler
- Super Halcón Jr. (born 1987), Mexican masked wrestler
- El Halcón (born 1947, as José Luis Melchor Ortiz), Mexican masked wrestler

== Places ==
- Mount Halcon, a mountain in the Philippines

== Military ==
- CASA C-202 Halcón, transport aircraft used by the Spanish Air Force
- Fábrica de Armas Halcón, Argentinian defense company
  - Halcón M-1943, submachine gun manufactured by the company
  - Halcón ML-57, submachine gun manufactured by the company
  - Halcón ML-63, submachine gun manufactured by the company
- Halcones, Chilean air force aerobatic display team
- Los Halcones, a Mexican paramilitary group that perpetrated the 1971 massacre El Halconazo

== Sports ==
- Halcones FC, in Huehuetenango, Guatemala; a soccer team
- Halcones de Morelos, in Cuernavaca, Morelos, Mexico; a soccer team
- Halcones de Querétaro, Santiago de Querétaro, México; a soccer team
- Halcones de Xalapa, Veracruz, Mexico; a basketball team

== Technology ==
- Halcon process, a method to make propylene oxide

== Other uses ==
- Hal-Con, an annual fan convention held in Halifax, Nova Scotia, Canada

== See also ==
- Halcones Rojos Veracruz, Mexico; a basketball team
