= Grupo Especial Uno =

1^{st} Combat Battalion-Special Group One 1^{er} Batallón de Combate-Grupo Especial Uno
- Abbreviation: GE-1
- Motto: Nihil Obstat; Nothing Hinders

Agency overview
- Formed: 1978

Jurisdictional structure
- Operations jurisdiction: Argentine
- General nature: Civilian police
- Specialist jurisdiction: Counter terrorism, special weapons operations; protection of internationally protected persons, other very important persons, or state property

Operational structure
- Parent agency: Argentine Federal Police

The 1er Batallón de Combate-Grupo Especial Uno (1st Combat Battalion-Special Group One, GE-1) is a tactical assault division of the Argentine Federal Police. It reports directly of the Infantry Guard Corps, and its motto is Nihil Obstat (Nothing Hinders).

== History ==
The unit was established under the denomination of Special Combat Teams in 1978, when Argentina hosted the Football World Cup.

Ten years later, in 1988, the division changed its name to Police Operations Group and officially became the premier counterterrorism team of the Federal Police.

In 1994 the GEOF was created and the GE-1 dramatically reduced its size, although some elements remained still functional.

The Superintendent of Metropolitan Security re-activated the unit in 2002.

The group quickly became an elite tactical force, with more than 400 successful tactical interventions.

== Training ==
All officers interested in joining GE-1 must undergo extensive training before they are allowed join. Basic training to join GE-1 lasts around nine weeks and consists of special police tactics, strategies and means of dealing with high risk crisis management, mental health crisis emergency, tactical medicine, swimming, tactical diving, survival in a variety of environments, tactical support, high-security custody of important people, custody of dangerous detainees, and security measures in the use of firearms in accordance with National Law No. 20429. Upon successfully completing their training, graduates receive a certificate, attributes, and a special forces beret. The training is known to be quite rigorous. In 2019, 21 individuals applied to join GE-1. Of the 21 that applied, only four passed the course that was held in Buenos Aires. It is important to know that all active personnel remains in their original unit and are called when needed, a selective style similar to many American SWAT groups. The division constantly trains with tactical units from other Argentinian law enforcement agencies, such as the Federal Penitentiary Service's Special Intervention Group (GEI), the Argentine Naval Prefecture's Albatross Group, and the Airport Security Police's Special Tactical Assault Group (GEAT), and foreign special units.

== Equipment ==
The group uses specialized weapons and gear such as:

Weapon	Origin	Type	Notes
Glock 17	Austria	Semi-automatic pistol	
Heckler & Koch MP5	Germany	Submachine gun	
Heckler & Koch HK33	Germany	Assault rifle	
M24 SWS	United States	Sniper rifle	
Taser			They are in limited use by the Special Units of the Special Federal Operations Group Division (GEOF), Special Group 1 (GE 1) and the Federal Intervention Tactical Units (UTIF) of the Argentine Federal Police. The Argentine Federal Police protocols indicate that tasers should be employed when all other legitimate means of achieving that objective are ineffective and the use of force does not cause more harmful consequences than those that would occur if it had not been used.

== See also ==
- Scorpion Group
- Albatross Group
- Federal Special Operations Group
- Hawk Special Operations Brigade
- Argentine Federal Police
