= 2013 Argentine police revolts =

- Date: 3–13 December 2013
- Location: Argentina
- Caused by: Wage claims by provincial police
- Methods: Walkout; Looting; Roadblock
- Status: Ended

Parties
Provincial police rebels; Looters	Provincial governments; Loyal police; Residents; Merchants	Government of Argentina; Ministry of National Security; Argentine National Gendarmerie; Argentine Naval Prefecture

Casualties and losses
18 deaths	400 injuries	

The 2013 Argentine police revolts were a series of protests by provincial police demanding better pay and working conditions, which affected 21 of Argentina's 23 provinces.

Some of the strike methods included neglect of duty and breaking into public buildings. Due to this situation, looting began to occur in some cities, Córdoba being the most affected, followed by Tucumán. The riots began on 3 December and ended ten days later.

== Preceding industrial dispute ==
In 2013, an estimated Argentinean inflation rate of 25% had eroded police officer's salaries, which were not automatically inflation index-linked. The wages paid by provincial governments, many of whom rely heavily upon the national government for funding, often failed to keep pace with the rapidly rising cost of living. Christmas-related pressure to buy gifts may have been one trigger for the unrest.

== The strike ==
The looting began on 3 December in Cordoba, Argentina’s second-largest city, when the provincial police force went on strike. More than 1,000 stores were robbed, hundreds of people were injured and one person was killed. Cordoba’s governor increased the police force’s basic salaries by 33%, which ended the disorder in Cordoba, but inspired police forces in other provinces.

Forces in 20 of Argentina’s 24 provinces followed the example of their colleagues in Cordoba, inviting widespread robbery and violence. Opportunistic members of the public "broke through shop windows and wrenched open doors to load up wheelbarrows and horse-drawn carriages with food, clothing and furniture". By 11 December, most governors had settled with their police forces, offering salary raises of as much as 45%. In many of these cases, lootings were carried out by organized criminals on motorcycles or by foot, who broke in different neighborhoods to steal anything they could find around them. They carried firearms and sticks, among other items.

As a result of the numerous riots and looting in most districts, 18 deaths were recorded (although this is not an official figure) and hundreds injured, especially due to armed clashes taking place in the Tucumán Province where the largest number of deaths (8) occurred, followed by Chaco Province with 4, and Entre Ríos Province with 3.

The Confederación Argentina de la Empresa and regional chambers of commerce estimated the losses at 568.450.000 Argentine pesos and 1.900 businesses were affected by looting.

The only districts where no protests and looting were reported are the Autonomous City of Buenos Aires, Santa Cruz Province and Santiago del Estero Province.

== Protests by city ==
=== Cordoba ===
Minimum salary
Before	After	Percent change
$ 6 500	$ 8 000	+35%

On November 14, the "preparatory phase" began through text messages from mobile phones, which activated the deliberation status of the entire police station. The plan was launched four days later with the appearance of the officer's wives in front of the police headquarters. It continued over the following days until Monday, December, 2, when protestors rushed the infantry guards, did not allow vehicles to enter and exit, and began a strike without any response from the government.

In the first hours of December 3, a hundred police officers were stationed at the CAP headquarters in Barrio Cervantes. In addition, police wives prevented the patrol cars from leaving. Over time, as more and more troops joined the capital and major interior cities, the conflict intensified. By noon, there were already more than two thousand troops stationed. The main demand was for a base salary of 13,000 pesos. Meanwhile, Governor De la Sota was located in Panama and was traveling to Colombia for a regional governors meeting.

At night, looting and theft multiplied in the streets affecting shops (clothing and appliances, among others) and supermarkets in different neighborhoods, putting the population through the most tragic moments since the looting of 2001. In many of these neighborhoods, like Nueva Cordoba, for example, the local neighbors took to the streets to attack the criminals and defend the shops. The criminals were made up of groups of people on foot or on motor vehicles that came to the shops, and tried to enter and steal the goods. There were also clashes between the criminals and security forces, for which an administrative shutdown was declared. Hospitals in the city could not keep up with the large number of people admitted with injuries from knives and fire, as well as accidents. Due to the situation, public transport, banks, and service stations were closed.

On social media, particularly on Facebook, youths posted photos of stolen goods on their profiles and shared details of how they were involved in the events. This information published on social media helped the police make arrests and recover goods. Around 52 police officers would be convicted for their involvement in the looting two years later.

=== Buenos Aires ===
Minimum salary
Before	After	Percent change
$ 4 700	$ 8 570	+82,3%

On 8 December, a hundred out-of-service police officers arrived at the barracks located on 59 and 115 streets in the city of La Plata and prevented the departure of troops who were to provide services in the Único Stadium of that city, demanding a minimum net salary of 12,500 pesos.

During the night hours, troops from the city of Mar del Plata joined the protest which caused a smaller number of police officers to guard the city. This situation was exploited by unknown persons to commit looting and destruction. The affected shops included a community market that was to be opened the following day, two small shops in the southern zone, and at least two premises of Peatonal San Martin that suffered broken windows and the theft of some items of clothing. Mayor Gustavo Pulti recommended that merchants keep their premises closed.

The governor Daniel Scioli was in Rio de Janeiro, where he had been invited to present at a meeting with former United States President Bill Clinton, but decided to return to La Plata to control the situation.

Finally, on November 10, he announced that the initial salary for a police officer will be 8,570 pesos, successfully defusing the conflict with the provincial security force. That increase is the sum of the salary plus bonuses for uniforms and overtime. However, thousands of shops in the province and in greater Buenos Aires closed their doors in advance. On Wednesday the 11th, in the city of San Nicolas de los Arroyos, a 21- and 23-year-old were arrested for organizing looting in that city through Facebook.

By Thursday the 12th, there were 164 arrests following the police protests and looting (71 behind bars, 37 released and 56 others, as minors, were handed over to their parents). The biggest arrests occurred in Mar del Plata. In addition, the provincial government announced that it suspected that the former police chief, Salvador Baratta, participated in the organization of the barracks in Mar del Plata, Adrogue and La Plata. Complaints were also made in the judicial system; the Attorney General of the Marplatan Judicial Department ordered the federal prosecutor on duty to investigate the police protest that caused a wave of robberies in the city.

The national government developed a plan to stop any eruptions and looting on December 19 and 20, when the anniversary of the 2001 crisis would occur. It mainly included monitoring "risk zones" in the federal capital (where there had been no conflicts with the police) and the city of Buenos Aires. This is due to accounts and rumors of possible looting on social networks. To this end, some 80 supermarkets located in the "risk zones" were under surveillance. Because of this, several shops announced that they will not open their doors that day, especially Chinese supermarkets (of which nearly 30 had already been looted around the country, while there were attempts at theft in the other 30) and the presence of the military and federal police was increased.

== See also ==
- Kirchners' Governments
- December 2001 riots in Argentina
- 2008 Argentine government conflict with the agricultural sector

General:

- Law enforcement in Argentina
- Police strike
