= Fábrica de Armas Halcón =

Argentine defense company

Fábrica de armas Halcón
- Company type: Private
- Industry: Defense
- Founded: 23 May 1941
- Headquarters: Buenos Aires, Argentina
- Key people: Carlos Martin, Gildo Marcati and Arnoldo Pienovi
- Products: Firearms, weapons

Fábrica de Armas Halcón (English: "Halcón Firearms Factory") was an Argentine defense company founded in 1941 and located in Buenos Aires.

== History ==
On 23 May 1941, Carlos Martin, Gildo Marcati and Arnoldo Pienovi, founded the defense company "Fábrica de Armas Halcón". This company began to work in the city of Avellaneda, province of Buenos Aires.

The facilities consisted of a building with two bodies. In one of them, the copying winches of fluted, winches for the preparation of butts, the matrices and the soldering mounted irons. The building also owned an ample cellar with tunnel for the test of submachine guns. In the other body, were the sections of polished, drop hammers, finished butts, bronzed, armed, packaging, deposits, plus stands for the test of .22LR calibre rifles. The factory consisted, also, of an office of projects and plans, where the plans of the different arms with the specifications from materials and tolerances were made. There the studies of manufacturing costs, process to manufacture, product control, etc. were done. Another important office was the destined one for quality control. The same consisted of elements of high accuracy (durometers, calibers, micrometers, comparators, etc.), with which the control of all the pieces was realised that were elaborated. It is possible to emphasize, that in his almost totality, the systems and mechanisms that used the arms of this company/signature was of its own design, credited with international patents. The company constructed the majority of its machineries in agreement with the needs that were arising in production. In fact, everything was elaborated in the factory: butts, guns, means, etc.

For 15 years, their managers maintained the patent exclusive of fluted by compression. This technique, originally as Halcon, served to execute the bordered ones of the guns of its arms. For such action four operations were required. The advantage consisted of granting major hardness to the steel and obtaining one more polished surface, avoiding therefore the heating of the guns, considering the smaller friction produced by the passage of the projectiles, mainly in the automatic weapons. The pieces that composed its rifles and machine guns were schemed or executed by winches or drop hammers, except for the marks of the pistols gas release devices, that were of smelting. For the preparation of the butts, walnut, original of the provinces of San Luis and Mendoza were used. This wood remained in the same plant for four or five years before they were utilized. The factory produced for its arms, the complementary accessories: magazines for machine guns (opened or closed), canvas covers and leather slings for firearms such as rifles and submachine guns, cleaning rods and ejector rods made of iron and bronze, brushes of several classes for cleaning of guns, anticorrosives. Inclusively, it got to make a shelf wood gunsmith.

Within the war material that the factory made specific in its facilities, Gun carriages for the Madsen light machine gun, .50 BMG caliber belt linking devices, for heavy machine guns, guns and shippers for .45 ACP caliber pistols, muzzle compensators for Thompson submachine guns used by the Argentine Federal Police and guns and spare components, reinforcement plates and hand guards made from shock-impact fibreglass, for FN FALs of the Argentine Air Force. Indeed, for this last distribution, it constructed different pumps of kilajes. The factory, that at the end of 1960 was renamed as the Metallurgical Centre S.C.A., was a supplier of the Argentine Armed Forces, and of some Police forces.

== Users ==
- Argentine Army
- Argentine Air Force
- Argentine National Gendarmerie
- Argentine Naval Prefecture
- Servicio Penitenciario Federal
- Argentine Federal Police
- Provincial police of Buenos Aires, Formosa, Mendoza, Tucumán and Salta.

== Products ==
=== Submachine guns ===
- Halcón M-1943, caliber .45 ACP
  - Halcón M-1946, caliber 9×19mm / .45 ACP
- Model Argentine Army 1949, caliber 9×19mm
- M57, caliber 9×19mm
- ML-57, caliber 9×19mm
  - ML-60, caliber 9×19mm
  - ML-63, caliber 9×19mm.
- Pistola ametralladora Halcón, modelo prototipo 1943 Gendarmería Nacional, calibre .45 ACP, ammo capacity 17/30 rounds.
- Carabina ametralladora Halcón, modelo Aeronáutica Argentina 1946, calibre .45 ACP, ammo capacity 30 rounds.
- Carabina ametralladora Halcón, modelo Ejército Argentino 1949, calibre 9×19mm, ammo capacity 36 rounds.
- Pistola ametralladora Halcón, modelo Ejército Argentino 1949, calibre 9×19mm, ammo capacity 40 rounds.
- Pistola ametralladora Halcón, modelo ML-57, calibre 9×19mm, ammo capacity 40 rounds.
- Pistola ametralladora Halcón, modelo ML-63, Policia Federal Argentina, calibre 9×19mm, ammo capacity 30 rounds.

== See also ==
- Bersa
