= Cuerpo Guardia de Infantería =

Infantry Guard Corps Cuerpo Guardia de Infantería
- Abbreviation: CGI

Jurisdictional structure
- Operations jurisdiction: Argentine
- General nature: Civilian police
- Specialist jurisdictions: Counter terrorism, special weapons operations; protection of internationally protected persons, other very important persons, or state property; Coastal patrol, marine border protection, marine search and rescue

Operational structure
- Parent agency: Argentine Federal Police

The Cuerpo Guardia de Infantería (Infantry Guard Corps, CGI) is the official denomination of all police riot control services of Argentina. Both federal and provincial law enforcement agencies have at least one.

The CGI are small, quick response teams, trained mainly in crowd control tactics and equipped with non-lethal shotguns, gas masks, police batons, plastic shields and other specialized riot gear.

== See also ==
- Scorpion Group
- Albatross Group
- Hawk Special Operations Brigade
- Federal Special Operations Group
- Argentine Federal Police
