= Agustín Feced =

Argentine police commander (1921–?)

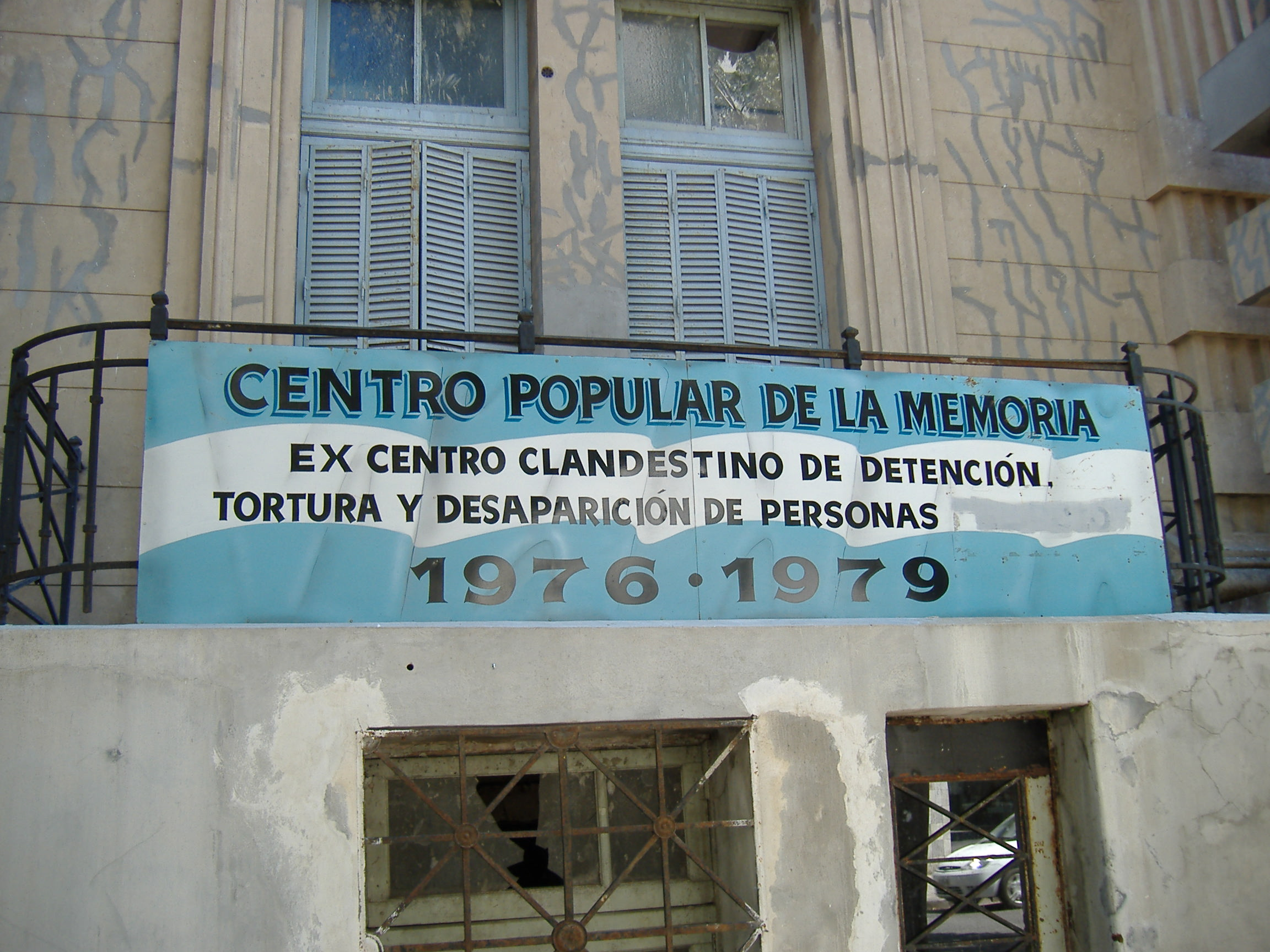
Centro Popular de la Memoria (Popular Memory Center) in Rosario, Argentina. The sign reads: Ex centro clandestino de detención, tortura y desaparición de personas, 1976–1979 (in English, "Former illegal center of detention, torture and disappearance of persons, 1976–1979"). It is placed on the former site of the headquarters of the police. Taken by Pablo D. Flores on 7 March 2006.

Agustín Feced (born June 11, 1921, died 1980s or 1990s) was a major and commander of the Argentine National Gendarmerie, and the head of the police of the Province of Santa Fe for the city of Rosario, during the Dirty War. He was in charge of the 2nd Regional Police Corps, and he was part of Intelligence Battalion 601 of the Argentine Army from June 1974, before the beginning of the military dictatorship, in the last days of the presidency of Juan Perón.

He was born in Acebal, Santa Fe. He was officially declared dead in 1986 but this is disputed. It has been widely claimed that he was still alive after this date.

== Disappearance ==
Between 1976 and 1979, and already under the dictatorship of the Proceso de Reorganización Nacional, Feced was the head of the Intelligence Service of the 2nd Corps, which doubled as an illegal detention center (the major one in the area, of a total of about 10). His office co-ordinated the repressive scheme in Rosario and its neighboring areas. People were kidnapped by squads and taken to the Intelligence Service to be held and tortured. Feced is known to have taken part in the kidnappings, in torture sessions when the victim was for some reason interesting to him, and in the killings, which were often conducted in faraway locations and sometimes passed off as fights between the police and armed terrorists. Two of Feced's foremost assistants in these crimes were José Rubén Lo Fiego and Mario Alfredo Marcote.

The Intelligence Service is now a memorial site called Centro Popular de la Memoria (People's Memorial Center), preserved by an organization of victims' relatives.

== Initial investigations ==
According to the extensive research conducted after the end of the Proceso, 720 people were "disappeared" in Santa Fe and 350 in Rosario. Feced, together with the then-commander of the 2nd Army Corps Leopoldo Galtieri, is considered responsible for most of them. Before the closing of the case against him, Feced was accused of 270 crimes against humanity. Though Rosario had comparatively a smaller number of "disappeared" people than other metropolitan areas, the proportion of those kidnapped who were set free from the detention centers and camps is smaller, and there were many more victims of torture and murder.

The Supreme Council of the Armed Council started an investigation about Feced in 1983, and produced a large amount of documentation including lists of missing people, anonymous burials in a cemetery in Rosario, and tens of criminal collaborators.

== Feced's cover-up and alleged death ==
This investigation took three years before it was passed on to the Federal Justice in Rosario. Feced was in theory to be in prison from the official opening of the case on January 31, 1984. Later, he was transferred by justice to the custody of the Military Hospital of Campo de Mayo (Buenos Aires). There he is claimed to have undergone heart surgery in 1985. At the time, though, he was in fact free in Formosa. These facts point to complicity and protection by many powerful interest (military, government officials and some powerful businessmen such as Alberto Gollán). On July 21, 1986, Feced was officially declared dead by the Military Hospital.

Many witnesses, survivors of the Intelligence Service, claim to have seen Feced alive after that date. A registry book of the Ariston Hotel in Rosario, presented as evidence to the court by the journalist Claudio de Luca, showed a signature with Feced's handwriting, dated July 29, 1988. Francisco Oyarzábal, the brother of a murdered victim, reported that Feced had been seen alive in Paraguay.

The investigation of the Intelligence Service case was archived in 1987 after the passing of the laws called Ley de Obediencia Debida (Law of Due Obedience) and Ley de Punto Final (Full Stop Law), during the presidency of Raúl Alfonsín, which restricted the accountability for human rights abuses to the highest levels of the military hierarchy (who had been already tried) and put an end to ongoing criminal investigations into the lower levels.

On December 15, 1989, the Penal Federal Court of Rosario, without giving weight to the above inconsistencies, declared the case against Feced extinct (closed) due to his alleged death. The rest of the people involved in the crimes of the Intelligence Service were pardoned by decree of President Carlos Menem in 1989–1990.

== Del Frade's research ==
Research conducted by the journalist Carlos del Frade since 1999, and published in 2002, shows that Feced's last recorded domicile was in the city of Buenos Aires. Though he was supposedly ill and senile, one of his former neighbors, interviewed by del Frade, contradicts this impression.

Within the San Antonio Cemetery in Formosa, in the area reserved for members of the Gendarmería, there is a grave with the name of Agustín Feced, and an announcement in the local newspaper La Mañana says that he was buried there on the same day of his death, at 5:30pm. The official records of the cemetery show only one person being buried there and then, and it is not Feced, but he does appear in an old notebook also found there. The unofficial record in the notebook was written by Ramón Giménez, Feced's son-in-law and then a top government official. Feced's coffin is sealed in the wall next to another one that dates from the mid-1990s, and almost 3 metres (9.8 ft) above ground. According to the guardian of the cemetery, San Antonio did not have lifts for coffins "until a few years ago" (1999), and working hours are 8:00am to 1:00pm, so Feced could not have been buried like that "unless [somebody] brought three ladders and a lot of people to get [the coffin] up there".

== Re-opening of the case ==
The case against the officers of the Intelligence Division, including Feced and many of his collaborators, was re-opened by federal judge Omar Digerónimo on September 6, 2004, who ordered a number of arrests. José Lo Fiego, Mario Marcote and another former police officer, José Carlos Scortechini, surrendered themselves almost immediately, but denying all of the accusations.

== See also ==
- List of people who disappeared mysteriously: post-1970
