= Halcón ML-57 =

Halcon ML-57
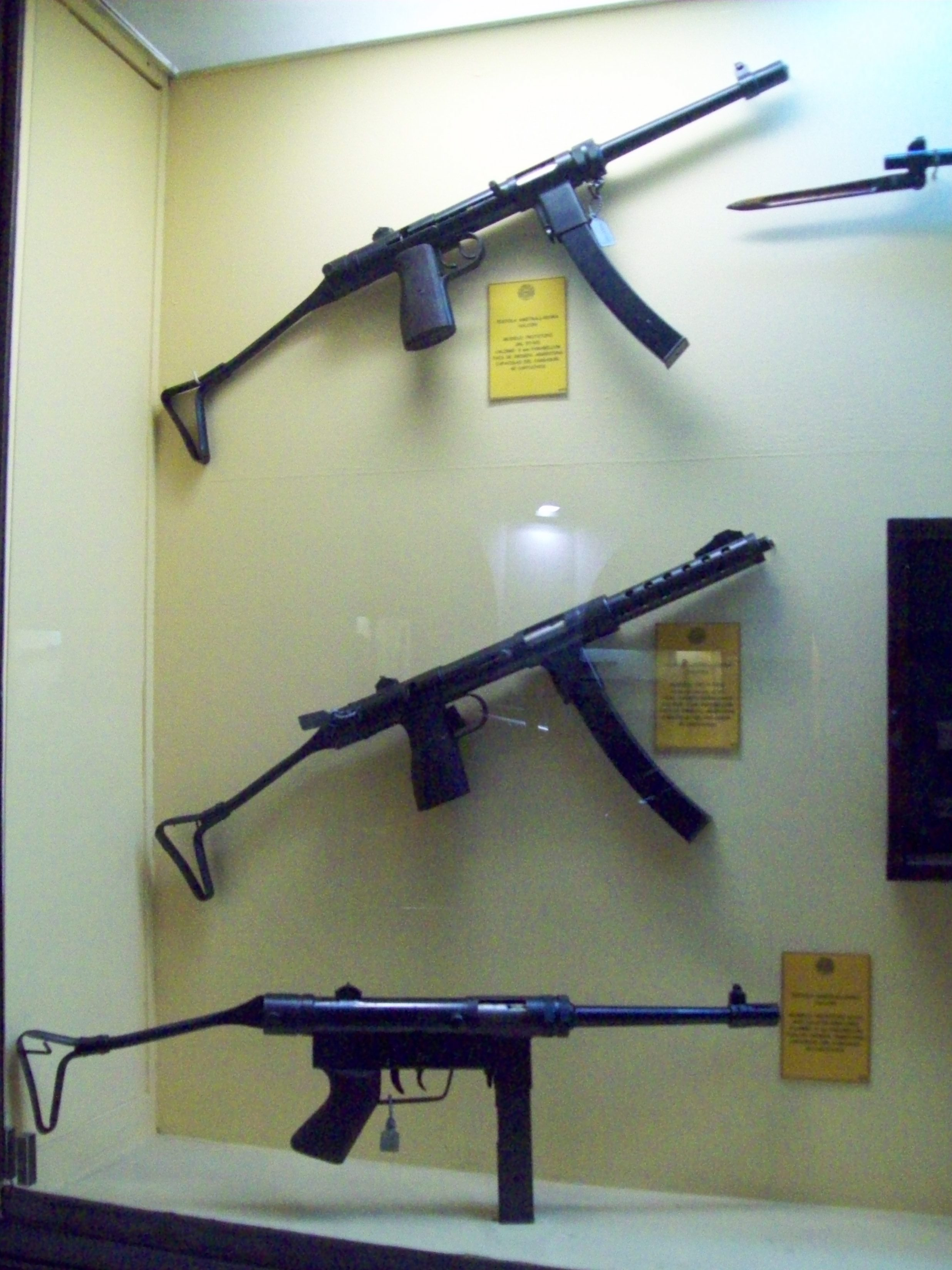
- Halcón ML-57/60 in top
- Type: Submachine gun
- Place of origin: Argentina

Service history
- Used by: Argentine Army; Argentine Air Force; Argentine National Gendarmerie; Argentine Federal Police; Argentine Naval Prefecture; Servicio Penitenciario Federal
- Wars: Argentine Dirty War; Salvadoran Civil War

Production history
- Designed: 1957
- Manufacturer: Buenos Aires Halcon
- Produced: 1957–?
- Variants: ML-57; ML-60

Specifications
- Barrel length: 292 mm
- Cartridge: 9×19mm Parabellum.45 ACP
- Caliber: 9mm, .45
- Action: Blowback
- Rate of fire: 700 RPM
- Effective firing range: 200 m
- Feed system: 40-round box magazine
- Sights: Iron sights

The ML-57 is a submachine gun manufactured by the Buenos Aires-based Halcon corporation.

== Overview ==
The weapon is chambered in 9mm Parabellum for the Argentine Army and in .45 ACP for Police Forces, fed from 30-round magazines.

== Variants ==
=== ML-60 ===
A later variant of the ML-57 was the ML-60 which housed a two trigger group which enabled select fire capabilities.

== See also ==
- Weapons of the Salvadoran Civil War
