= Halcón ML-63 =

Halcon ML-63
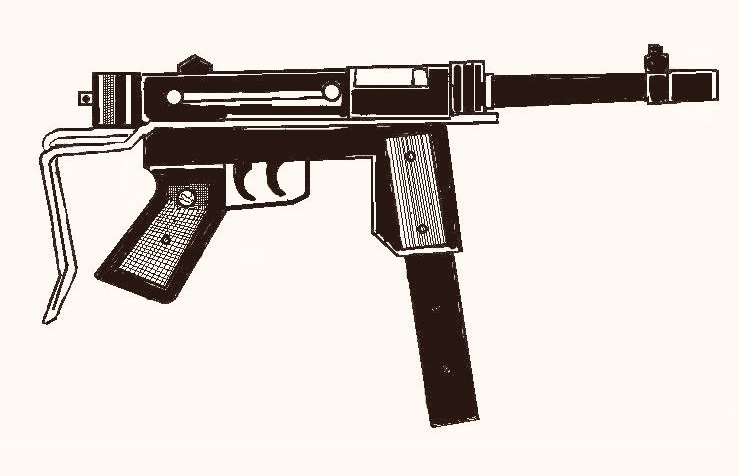
- Type: Submachine gun
- Place of origin: Argentina

Service history
- In service: 1982
- Used by: EA; FAA; GNA; PFA; PNA; SPF
- Wars: Falklands War

Production history
- Manufacturer: Buenos Aires Halcon
- Produced: 1957-1960s
- Variants: Fixed Stock; Retaractable Stock; Suppressed Variant

Specifications
- Mass: 8.04 lbs (without magazine)
- Length: 690mm (500mm with retracted stock)
- Cartridge: 9×19mm Parabellum
- Caliber: 9mm
- Rate of fire: 600 RPM
- Muzzle velocity: 350 m/s
- Effective firing range: 100 m
- Feed system: 30-round / 42-round box magazine
- Sights: Iron

The ML-63 is a submachine gun manufactured by the Buenos Aires-based Halcon corporation.

== Overview ==
The ML-63 is chambered in 9mm Parabellum and is fed from a 30-round magazine. The ML-63 also came with a fixed wooden stock, which appears to be based primarily on the MAT-49 Submachine Gun. An integrally suppressed version was also made. A number of ML-63 submachine guns were found by the British during the Falklands War in 1982.
