= M1943 =

M1943 can refer to a variety of weapons & garments:

- U.S. Army M1943 uniform
- 152 mm howitzer M1943 (D-1)
- 160 mm mortar M1943
- Halcon M-1943
- 76 mm regimental gun M1943
- 57 mm anti-tank gun M1943 (ZiS-2)
