= Popular center of remembrance =

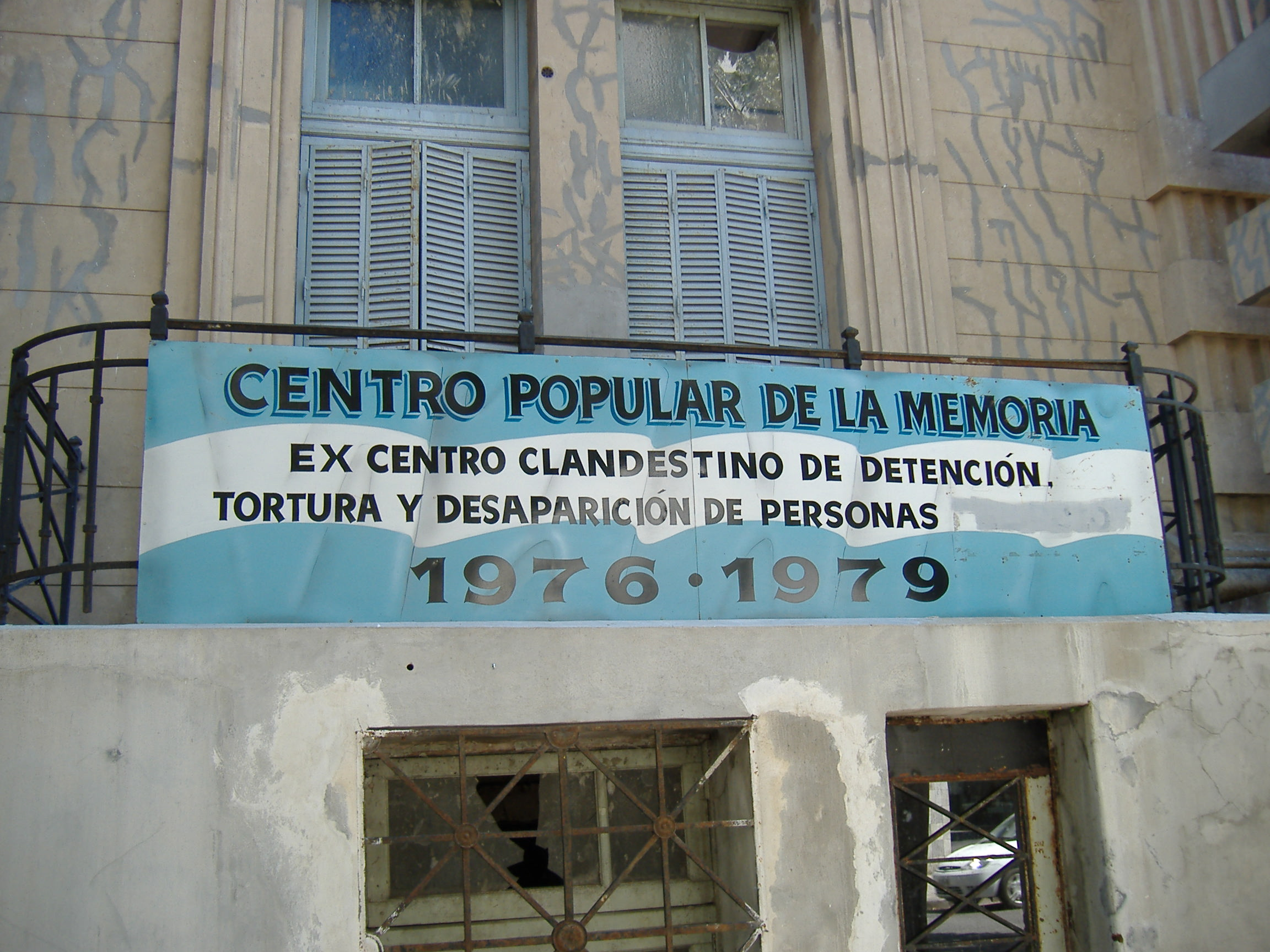
The sign at the entrance of the Centro Popular de la Memoria.

The Popular center of remembrance (Centro Popular de la Memoria) is a former illegal detention center in Rosario, province of Santa Fe, Argentina. It was used by the provincial police between 1976 and 1979, during the Dirty War, to hold people with no formal charges and torture them, under the pretense of fighting radical left-wing political subversion and terrorism. Most of the detainees were in fact social activists, political dissidents, or merely relatives or acquaintances of people that were ideologically suspect in the eyes of the military junta of the self-styled National Reorganization Process.

The CPM occupies a corner of a large building that takes up a whole block in the city center, between Dorrego and Moreno and between Santa Fe and Córdoba St. It used to be the police headquarters, and during the Dirty War it was formally the home of an intelligence division of the provincial police (Servicio de Informaciones de la Unidad Regional II). There is evidence of its use as a detention center since 1976 and until 1979. It was informally termed El Pozo ("The Pit") and La Favela ("The Favela").

The head of the Intelligence Service at the time was Gendarmería Commander Agustín Feced, who sometimes took part personally in kidnappings, torture sessions and executions. Two of his foremost collaborators were José Rubén Lo Fiego, who are being investigated since 2004.

After the fall of the last military junta and the return to democracy in 1983, the building continued to serve its official functions, until 2001, when human rights organizations demanded that it be preserved. On 22 March 2001 the Ministry of Government of the province of Santa Fe dictated Resolution No. 0060 to fulfill this request. The official facilities were dismantled and the police headquarters were moved elsewhere. A part of the building was given to municipal control, another one was turned into a delegation of the provincial government, and the central courtyard became an open public square. The relevant sections were granted to a group of human rights organizations by Decree No. 0717 of 2002-05-09 with the name of Centro Popular de la Memoria. It now hosts a memorial exhibition managed by relatives of victims of forced disappearance.

A documentary film about the CPM was released, with the support of a local producer (Calanda Producciones). It includes the story of the investigation and recovery of the detention center as a memorial, and testimonies of the research team and some survivors.

== Pictures ==
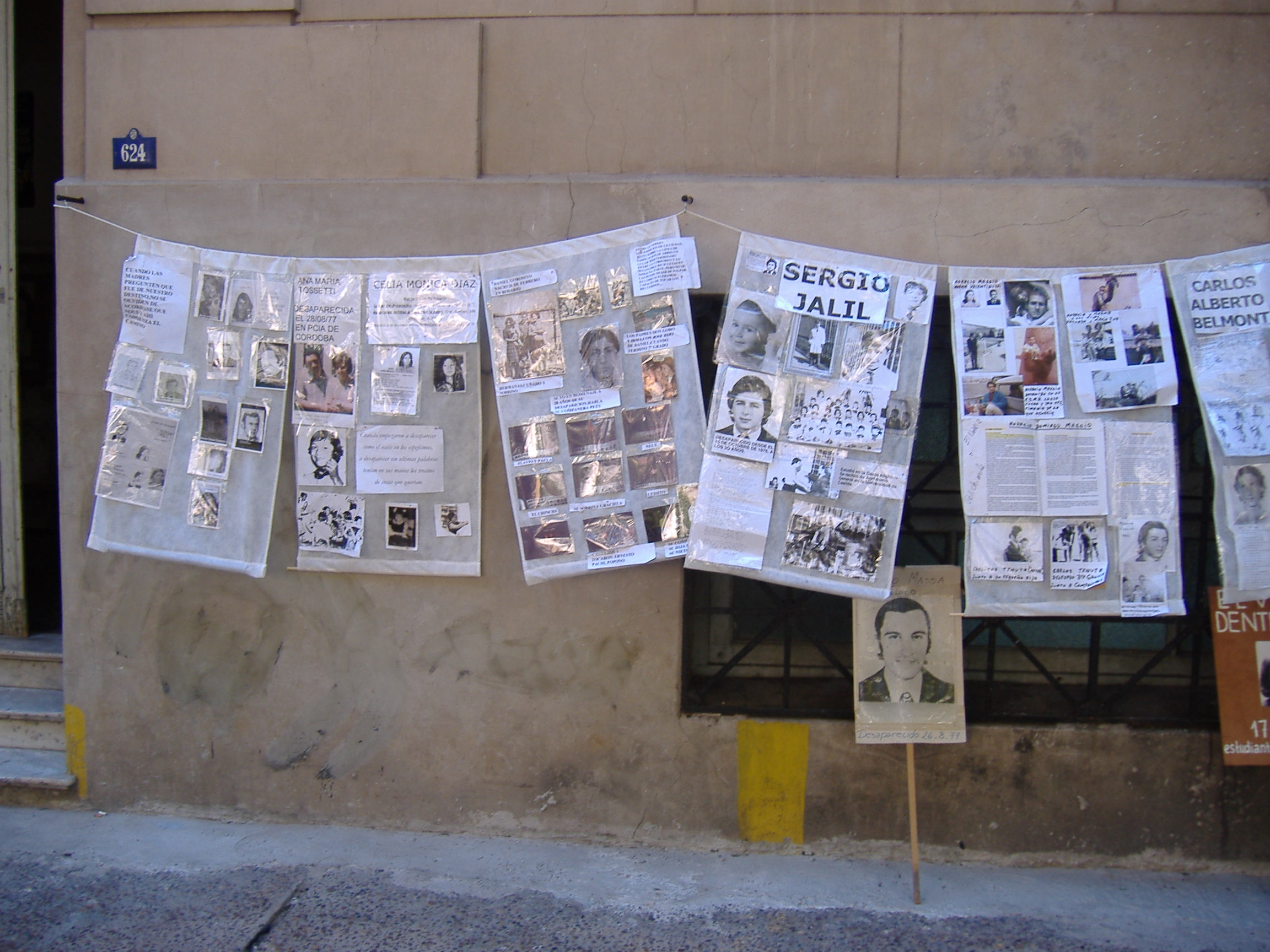
Newspaper clips and mementos of desaparecidos.

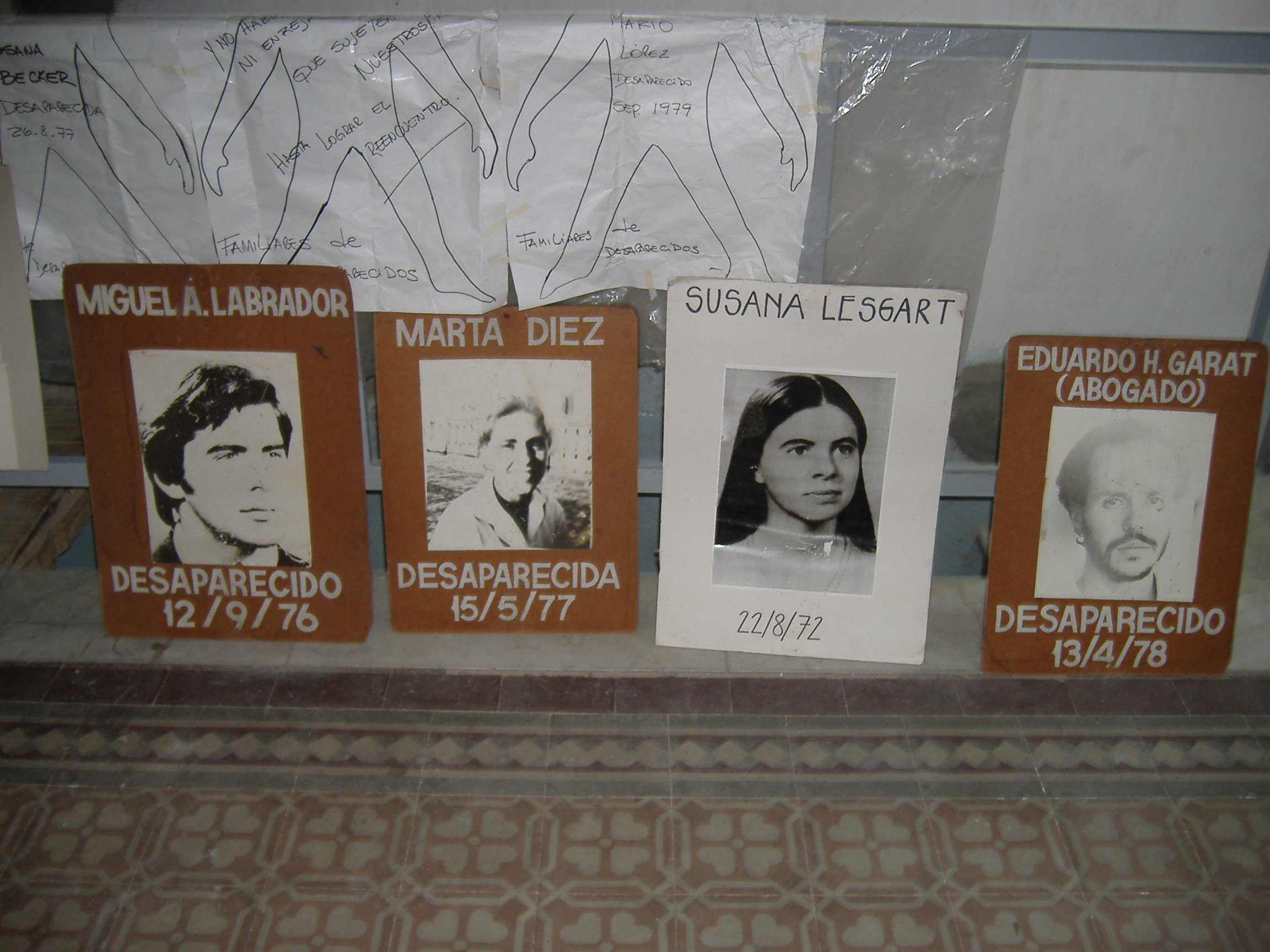
Pictures of desaparecidos used in demonstrations.

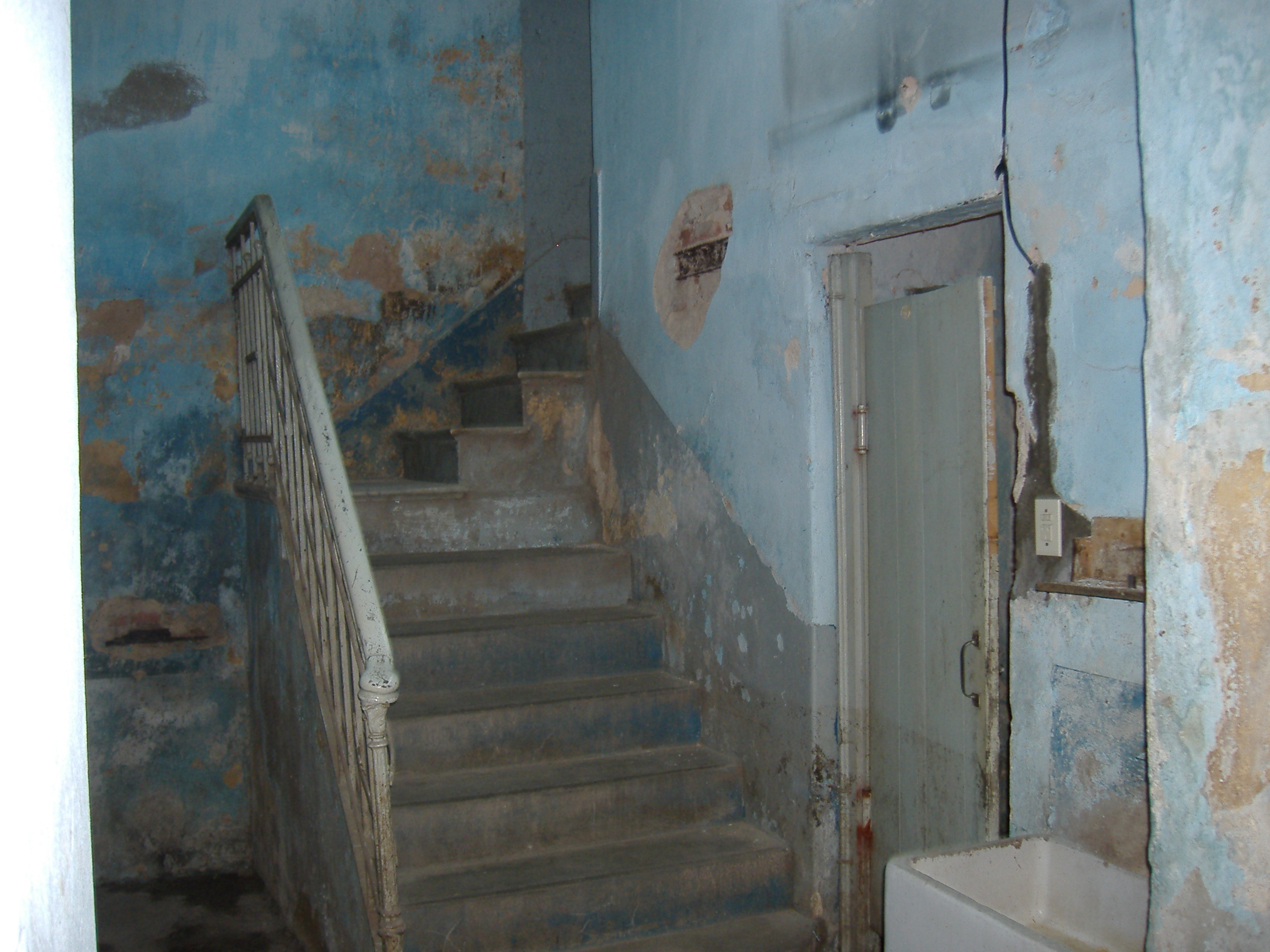
Underground site.

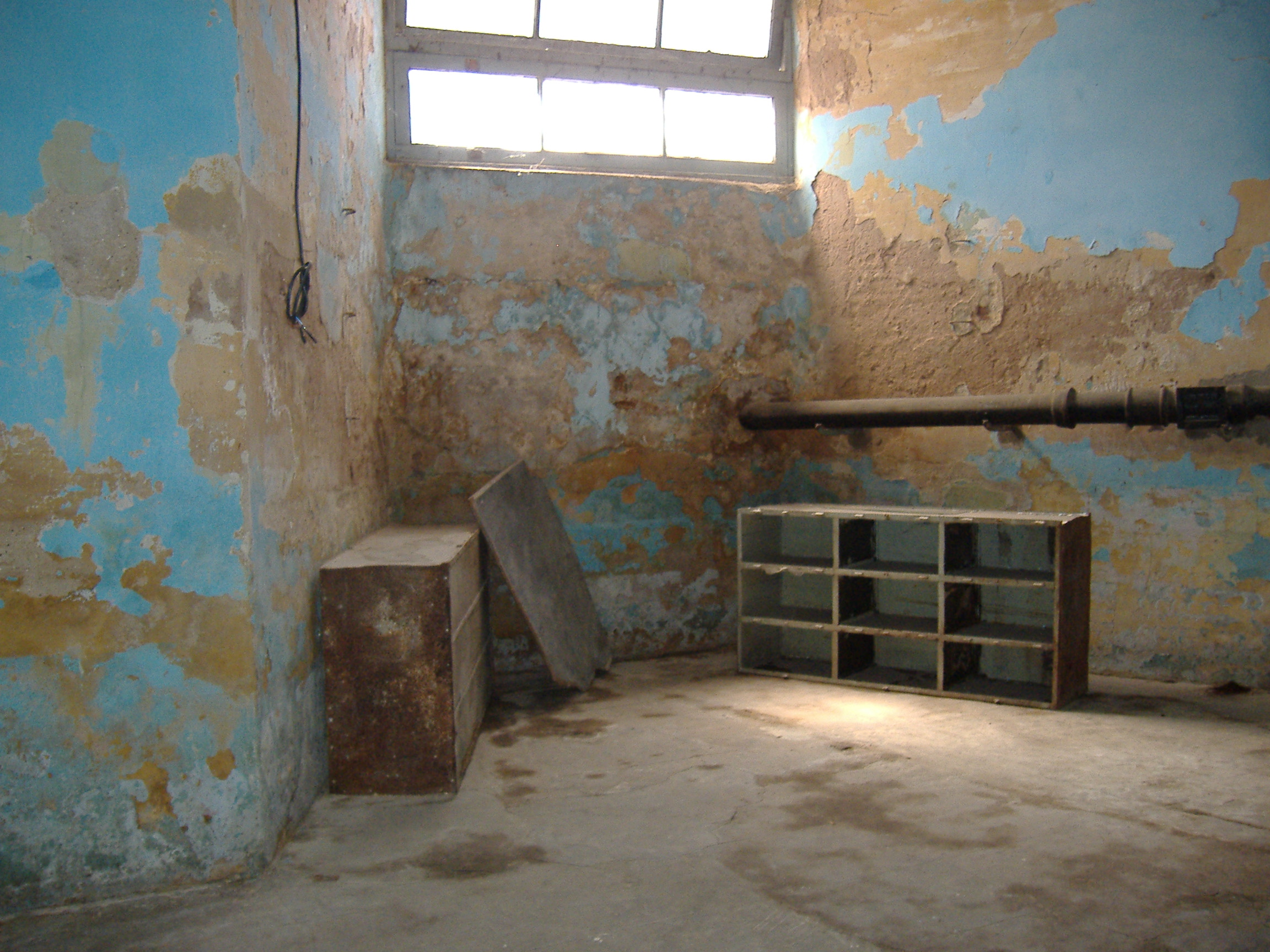
Underground site.
