= M46 =

M46 or M-46 most often refers to:

- M46 Patton, an American main battle tank
- Messier 46, an open star cluster in the constellation Puppis
- 130 mm towed field gun M1954 (M-46), a Soviet artillery piece

M46 or M-46 may also refer to:

- Volvo M46 transmission, a Volvo M45 (Four-speed) with an electric overdrive added
- M-46 (Michigan highway), a state highway in Michigan
- the 46th known Mersenne prime
- M1946 Sieg automatic rifle
- Halcón M-1943, an Argentine submachine gun
- Madsen M/50, a Danish submachine gun
- M46 (Cape Town), a Metropolitan Route in Cape Town, South Africa
- M46 (Johannesburg), a Metropolitan Route in Johannesburg, South Africa
- M46 (Durban), a Metropolitan Route in Durban, South Africa
