= M1946 =

M1946 may refer to:

- M1946 Sieg automatic rifle
- Halcón M-1946
- Madsen M/46
- 130 mm towed field gun M1954 (M-46)
