= Grupo Albatros =

Special operations unit in the Argentinian Navy

Albatross Group Grupo Albatros

Jurisdictional structure
- Operations jurisdiction: Argentine
- General nature: Civilian police
- Specialist jurisdictions: Counter terrorism, special weapons operations; protection of internationally protected persons, other very important persons, or state property; Coastal patrol, marine border protection, marine search and rescue

Operational structure
- Parent agency: Prefectura Naval Argentina

The Grupo Albatros (Albatross Group) is a special operations service of the Prefectura Naval Argentina (PNA). Unlike the tactical units of other agencies in Argentina, the Argentine Naval Prefecture allows women to join this group.

== History ==
The Albatross Group was created on April 3, 1975, to quickly and efficiently intervene in situations that require specific tactical capabilities. They took part in the Falkland War as five members of the Albatross Group were part of the Falkland Islands Prefecture located in Puerto Darwin that was inaugurated on April 16, 1982, which carried out patrols, security tasks and assistance in the area. As of April 2026, the head of Albatross Group is Major Prefect Héctor Cabrera.

== Duties ==
Located in the province of Buenos Aires, it conducts river and maritime operations in the lakes and rivers and anything close to the coastline. Their main responsibilities include providing security to people and property in the event of sabotage, attacks, riots, social outbreaks or fortuitous or provoked contingencies, restoration and maintenance of public order, guaranteeing freedom of work, preventing and fighting against drug trafficking, assist the community with disaster relief, and supporting operational bodies in tasks of surveillance, custody and protection of critical and vital objectives.

In addition to Counter-Terrorist missions, they handle search and rescue and criminal responses.

== Training ==
The Albatross Group constantly trains with tactical units from other Argentinian law enforcement agencies, such as the Federal Penitentiary Service's Special Intervention Group (GEI), the Argentine Federal Police's Special Federal Operations Group Division (GEOF) and Special Group 1 (GE 1), and the Airport Security Police's Special Tactical Assault Group (GEAT), and tactical units from foreign governments, like the Paraguayan National Police's Special Police Operations Forces (FOPE). Every morning and afternoon, all members of the group are required to do physical preparation routines on land, water, and sometimes in the air using helicopters.

== Gear ==
The Albatros group uses specialized weapons and gear such as:

Weapon	Origin	Type
Beretta 92	Italy	Semi-automatic pistol
Heckler & Koch MP5	Germany	Submachine gun
Franchi SPAS-15	Italy	Shotgun
FN FAL	Argentina	Assault rifle
SIG SG 552 Commando	Switzerland	Assault rifle
IWI X95	Israel	Assault rifle
SIG Sauer SSG 3000	Switzerland	Sniper rifle

== Operations ==
On July 30, 2020, forty-five operatives from the Albatross Group, along with members of another group that was not identified who specialized in critical situations, challenging environments, and hostile places, were deployed Rosario to help try to fight the intentional fires on the islands of the Paraná Delta, patrol part of the wetland to try to prevent other fires from being started, assist in identifying people and arrest people who are suspected of having caused these fires. Five hydroplanes and some helicopters from the Argentine Federal Police were also deployed to help fight the fires. They raked the area near where the grassland was burning, while also trying to avoid the fires. They camped on the islands in front Rosario for twenty days. Their main objective was to protect the area and prevent the fires from getting to the grasslands.

The Albatross Group was deployed in Rosario again in 2022, along with 8,000 troops from the PNA, after fires broke out in Rosario, Arroyo Seco, and Villa Constitución to patrol the area to prevent more fires from being intentionally started and raking areas to prevent the fire from spreading. The Pumas Rural Guard (Spanish: la Guardia Rural Los Pumas), and the Argentine Army, who arrived at the Alvear Operational Command on September 14, 2022, assisted them with preventing new fires from being intentionally started and fighting the fires. On August 26, 2026, the fires near Rosario were effectively contained. However, the fires in Arroyo Seco and Villa Constitución were still being worked on.

In 2026, the Argentine Naval Prefecture, including operators from the Albatross Group, intercepted a boat carrying contraband merchandise located on the Paraná River, Misiones, within Puerto Iguazú from the Paraguayan coast. A PNA patrol detected a boat that had left the coast of Paraguay loaded with numerous number of packages. When the criminals realized that they had been detected by members of the Argentine Naval Prefecture, the crew members of the vessel quickly returned to the coast of Paraguay, abandoned the cargo and fled through the vegetation. When the PNA personnel approached the boat with the packages, they began to be attacked from both sides of the river with gunfire from automatic weapons and shotguns and pelting stones at them.

A federal justice ordered the troops to withdraw to a safe area. In the process of executing that command, a new armed attack happened from the Paraguayan coast, which resulted in a member of the Albatross Group being injured. The injured operator was received assistance and was transferred to a local health center. Federal and provincial forces, including the Argentine National Gendarmerie, as well as judicial authorities also intervened in the operation. In the aftermath, the seized items were transferred to a local agency, where the packages were opened in the presence of witnesses. There was a total of fifty-three packages containing household appliances, electronic equipment, cell phones of different brands, articles of commercial value and other materials. The total value of what was seized is exceeds 245 million pesos.

== Controversies ==
In July of 2025, five officers from the Albatross Group were convicted of intentional homicide aggravated by the use of a firearm, with excess in legitimate defense for killing Rafael Nahuel during an eviction operation carried out on the territory where the Lafken Winkul Mapu community on November 25, 2017, in Villa Mascardi. The operation involved more than 200 federal troops from different government agencies, with tanks and a helicopter. None of the individuals convicted received sentences exceeded 5 years and 8 months in prison, as that was maximum penalty for that crime at the time. By request of the Secretariat of Human Rights, the Secretariat of Human Rights was named a plaintiff in the case, which allowed them to access the judicial file, request evidentiary measures, control the tests carried out and those pending production, and appeal the decisions taken regarding the future of the investigation. While the Permanent Assembly for Human Rights (Spanish: Asamblea Permanente por los Derechos Humanos, APDH), who was a Plaintiff in the case, appreciated the ruling of the Federal Court for denying the statements made at the time of the events by certain government officials, the APDH were concerned about how the political authorities who were involved in that event were not held accountable for their actions. The community Rafael was a member of has continued calling for action to prosecute the political officials involved in the operation. On November 26, 2025, a protest was held at the Monument to Julio Argentino Roca, between Diagonal Sur and Perú, City of Buenos Aires.

== Other tactical units that operate in Argentina ==
- Scorpion Group
- Hawk Special Operations Brigade
- Federal Special Operations Group
- Special Operations Troops Company
- Special Group One

== See also ==
- Grupo de Operaciones Policiales Especiales
- Sinchis
- Search Bloc
- Special Force to Fight Drug Trafficking
- UMOPAR
- Comando de Operações Táticas
- BEPE
