= Franchi SPAS-12 =

Combat shotgun

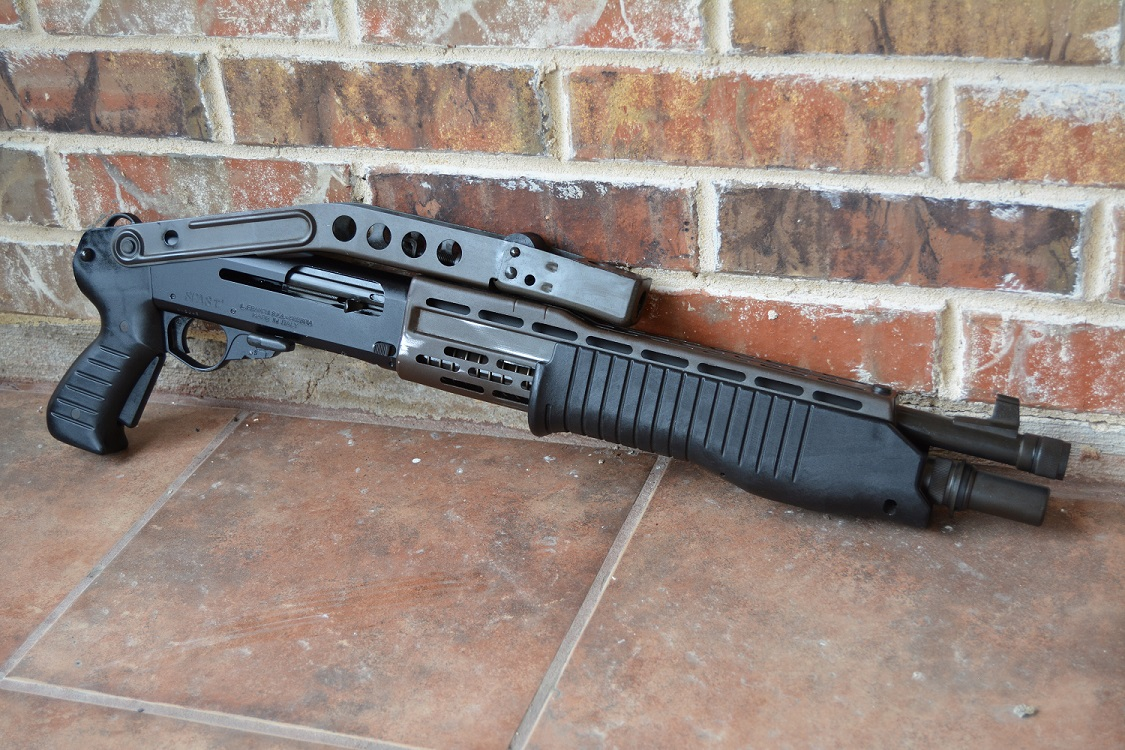
- SPAS-12 with short barrel
- Type: Combat shotgun
- Place of origin: Italy

Service history
- In service: 1979–present
- Used by: See Users
- Wars: The Troubles; Lebanese Civil War; Myanmar civil war (2021–present)

Production history
- Designer: Franchi
- Designed: 1979
- Manufacturer: Franchi
- Produced: 1979–2000
- No. built: 37,000
- Variants: LAW-12; SAS-12; SPAS-15

Specifications
- Mass: 4.4 kg (9.68 lb)
- Length: 1041 mm (41 in) stock extended; 820 mm (32.5 in) stock folded
- Barrel length: 18",19-7/8",21-1/2",24"
- Cartridge: 12 gauge 2 3/4 inch shells only
- Action: Pump-action/gas-operated, rotating bolt
- Rate of fire: Semi-automatic (200-350 rounds/min) or pump-action
- Effective firing range: Dependent on ammunition used
- Feed system: Tube extension 5+1, 6+1, 7+1 and 8+1 rounds, internal tube magazine
- Sights: Iron sights

The Franchi SPAS-12 is a combat shotgun manufactured by Italian firearms company Franchi from 1979 to 2000. The SPAS-12 is a dual-mode shotgun, adjustable for semi-automatic or pump-action operation. The SPAS-12 was sold to military and police users worldwide, as well as on the civilian market.

The appearance and intended purpose of the SPAS-12 initially led to its "military" designation as a combat shotgun. The SPAS-12 was designed from the ground up as a rugged military shotgun, and it was named the Special Purpose Automatic Shotgun. In 1990, Franchi renamed the shotgun the Sporting Purpose Automatic Shotgun, which allowed continued sales to the United States as a limited-magazine-capacity, fixed-stock model until 1994. Following the United States Federal Assault Weapons Ban, imports of SPAS-12 shotguns to the United States were stopped. In September 2004 the ban expired, but Franchi ended production of the SPAS-12 in 2000 to focus on the manufacturing of the SPAS-15 model. The SPAS-12's factory retail price in its final year was US$1,500 averaged for its final sales outside the United States to non-restricted countries.

== Design ==
SPAS 12 with a shot diverter

The SPAS-12 was designed to function primarily in semi-automatic mode, with the pump-action mode used to reliably fire low-pressure ammunition such as tear gas rounds or less-lethal bean bags. The firing mode is switched by depressing the button under the fore-grip and also sliding it forwards or backwards until it clicks into position allowing the rotating sleeve to open or close the two gas ports.

The semi-automatic mode functions with a short-stroke gas piston system. When a shell is fired, the pressure makes the bolt move rearward but the bolt will stop before opening as it deploys a single top locking lug. The gas vents into the barrel and the gas port is located towards the end of the barrel. From the gas port, the gas vents downwards into the gas block where it pushes the piston rearward. Because of the presence of the magazine tube and to avoid the use of a top-mounted gas system, the gas block and the piston are annular, along with the piston spring they enclose the magazine tube. Once operated, the piston drives two symmetrical thin sprung operating rods located in the corners formed by the barrel and the magazine tube. As the rods push the bolt carrier rearward, it disengages the locking lug and drives the bolt rearward, allowing the system to cycle.

The SPAS-12 has a magazine cut-off feature, which prevents the magazine from releasing a new round when the action is cycled. This allows the operator to load a different type of round into the chamber without first unloading the chambered round, and the second that would otherwise subsequently be released from the magazine.

A unique feature of the folding-stock variants is the butt hook. With the stock extended, the hook can be pushed in and turned 90 degrees to the left or right, to fit under the user's forearm. This is to enable the shotgun to be fired with one hand; e.g. while abseiling/rappelling, or from a vehicle window while driving. The hook can be released from the buttplate completely by turning 180 degrees.

SPAS-12 models feature two safeties: (i) a lever style or push button style safety, and (ii) a "quick employment safety". Lever safeties were recalled by Franchi and were replaced through the importer American Arms in the early 1990s.^{[a]} There are two types of push-button safeties. The earliest version would release the hammer on a safe up to 1/4in. of travel when the trigger was depressed; this would cause a lockup of the action that would require the user to re-lock the bolt assembly to the rear to reset the hammer and then reload the chamber. The later version installed a detent and machined hole in the trigger group frame to prevent an action lock; the detent would prevent the hammer from engaging when the trigger was depressed and would prevent an action lock from occurring. The quick employment safety, which is on the left side of the trigger guard, disconnects the trigger when put into safe mode. The quick employment safety can be disengaged with the trigger finger when ready to fire and is intended for competition or tactical use. A third safety type, a pistol grip safety similar to the later-developed SPAS-15, is known to have been developed by Franchi for the SPAS-12, however, the pistol grip safety was not offered for sale to the general public.

A B-Square rail mount for optics was available for a short time in the 1990s as an aftermarket accessory.

The barrel of the SPAS-12 was externally threaded to accept a variety of attachments. The barrel is cylinder bored and spreads a normal shot charge to about 900mm at 40 meters.

There are four different magazine extension tubes manufactured for the SPAS-12:

1. The 5-shell was designed for the 18" barrel.
2. The 6-shell was designed for restriction on the standard 21.5" Sporting Purpose model.
3. The 7-shell was designed for the 19 7/8" barrel.
4. The 8-shell was designed for the 21.5 Special purpose model.

Many choke types original and aftermarket exist for the SPAS-12. A 44 mm grenade launcher was used by France for explosive grenades capable of a range of 150 meters. A factory shot diverter that spreads shot vertically or horizontally was originally included with earlier model SPAS-12s. There are many known reproduction diverters.

== SPAS-12, SAS-12 and LAW-12 model differences ==
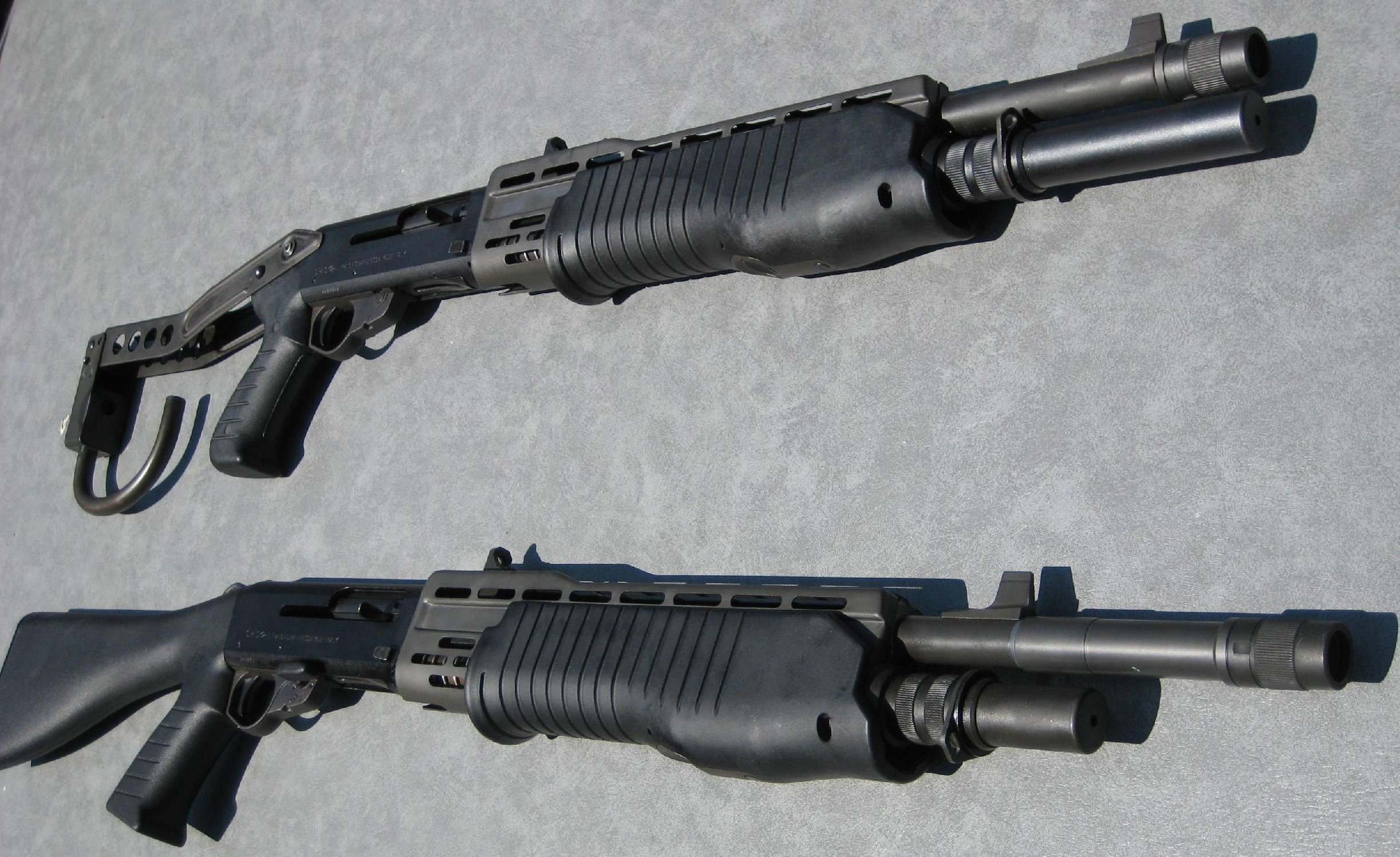
Two of the most commonly found SPAS-12 variants: the folding-stock version (with an eight-round magazine extension) by F.I.E Corp and the fixed-stock version (with a six-round magazine extension) by American Arms Inc.

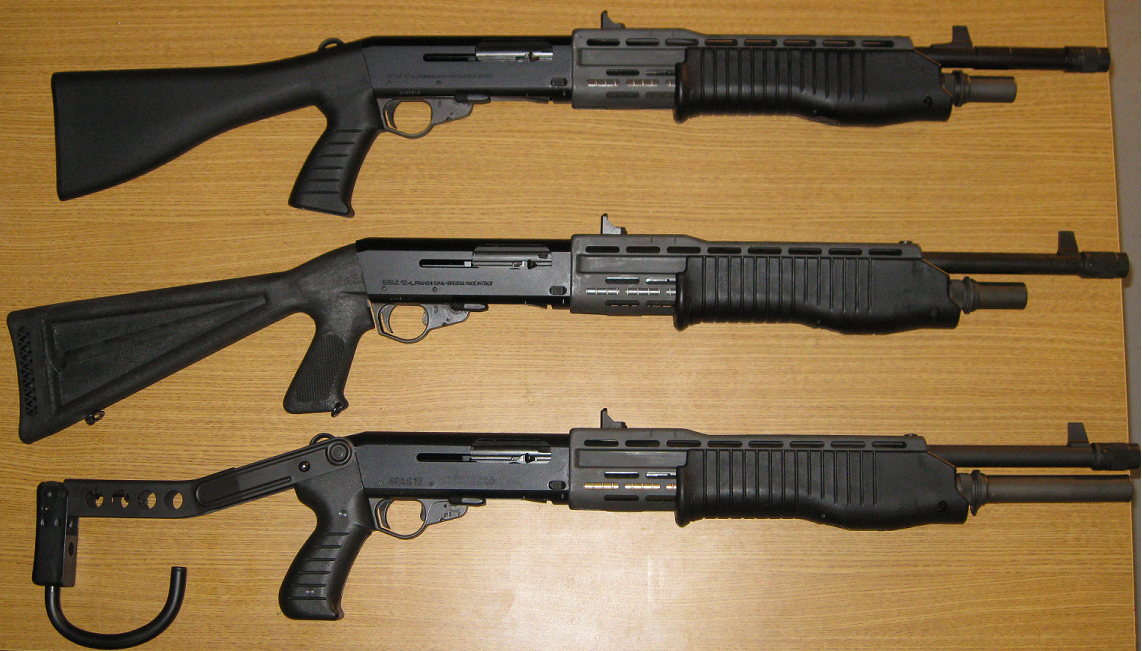
(Top) Fixed stock 1990 Sporting Purpose SPAS-12 receiver. (Middle) A rare Choate-made aftermarket AR-15 grip-style skeleton stock on a 1987 SPAS-12. (Bottom) Special Purpose Collector SPAS from 1982 with the folding stock and hook.

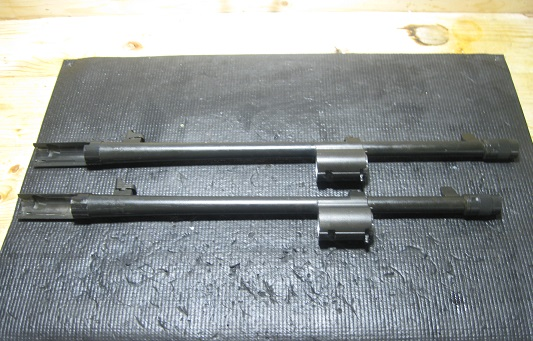
SPAS-12 21 1/2" barrel vs 19 7/8" barrel

Four different stock styles exist. The first version of the SPAS-12 was manufactured with a wooden detachable stock and a standard grip. Later models included the folding metal stock with a hook. After the United States imposed import restrictions on the SPAS-12 in 1989, a version was released in 1990 with the synthetic hollow fixed stock and a six-shell capacity to comply with federal regulations for sporting purposes.

Four different factory barrels were manufactured for the SPAS-12.

1. (Very rare) 18-inch (46 cm) "shorty" made for law enforcement/military and originally distributed mainly in France. This is the only known model to receive the pistol grip safety.
2. (Very rare) 19 7/8 in (50 cm) found scattered on very few of the 1983 "AL" proofed SPAS-12 shotguns. These were originally made for law enforcement/military applications.
3. (Common to the United Kingdom) 21 1/2 in (55 cm) as a one-piece barrel converted to a 24-inch (61 cm) UK-legal barrel. This barrel adds a 2.5-inch (64 mm) choke tube brazed or silver-soldered in place.
4. (Most common) The standard 21 1/2 in (55 cm) with sight blade muzzle ended on the barrel for the special purpose model or the pushed back sight blade with brazed extension for the sporting purpose model.

The Franchi SPAS-12 came equipped with a non-adjustable circular aperture rear sight and a large, non-adjustable blade foresight integrated into the barrel. The LAW-12 was semi-automatic only and the SAS-12 was a pump-action only. These three "sister" shotguns accepted all SPAS-12 components, notably trigger groups, barrel threaded attachments and stocks. The various magazine extension tubes of the LAW-12 and SAS-12 were never designed to be interchangeable with the SPAS-12 as this would cause issues with the gas selector switch moving from auto to pump-action on the SPAS-12 model. The extensions have been known to spin off the front of the SPAS-12 during cycling if the extension was not tapered for the SPAS-12 retaining pin.

The pump-action Franchi SAS-12 could accept 3" shells but it did not have a bolt handle cut in the bolt body. The SPAS and LAW could only accept 2 3/4" shells. The SAS-12 has a barrel length of 21 1/2 in (55 cm), an overall length of 41 1/2 in (105 cm), a weight of 7 lb 4 oz (3.3 kg) and a capacity of 8 rounds in the magazine + 1 in the chamber.

The semi-automatic-only Franchi LAW-12 Model was also restricted by importation in 1989 and banned in 1994 with the Federal Assault Weapons Ban. The LAW-12 has a barrel length of 21 1/2 in (55 cm), a weight of 7 lb 4 oz (3.3 kg) and a capacity of 8 rounds in the magazine + 1 in the chamber. The model was known to have been imported with all stock styles used on the Franchi SPAS-12. The LAW-12 models were more common with police sales as an alternative to the more expensive SPAS-12 for departments throughout the United States. The LAW-12 model was notably lighter – 1.35 lb (0.61 kg) – than the SPAS-12 and still maintained the same tube capacity of 8+1 shells. LAW-12 gas pistons were designed as two pieces; unlike the one-piece design of the SPAS-12, they are not interchangeable. The LAW-12 was discontinued by Franchi shortly before the SPAS-12 was discontinued in 2000.

== US market ==
=== Importers ===
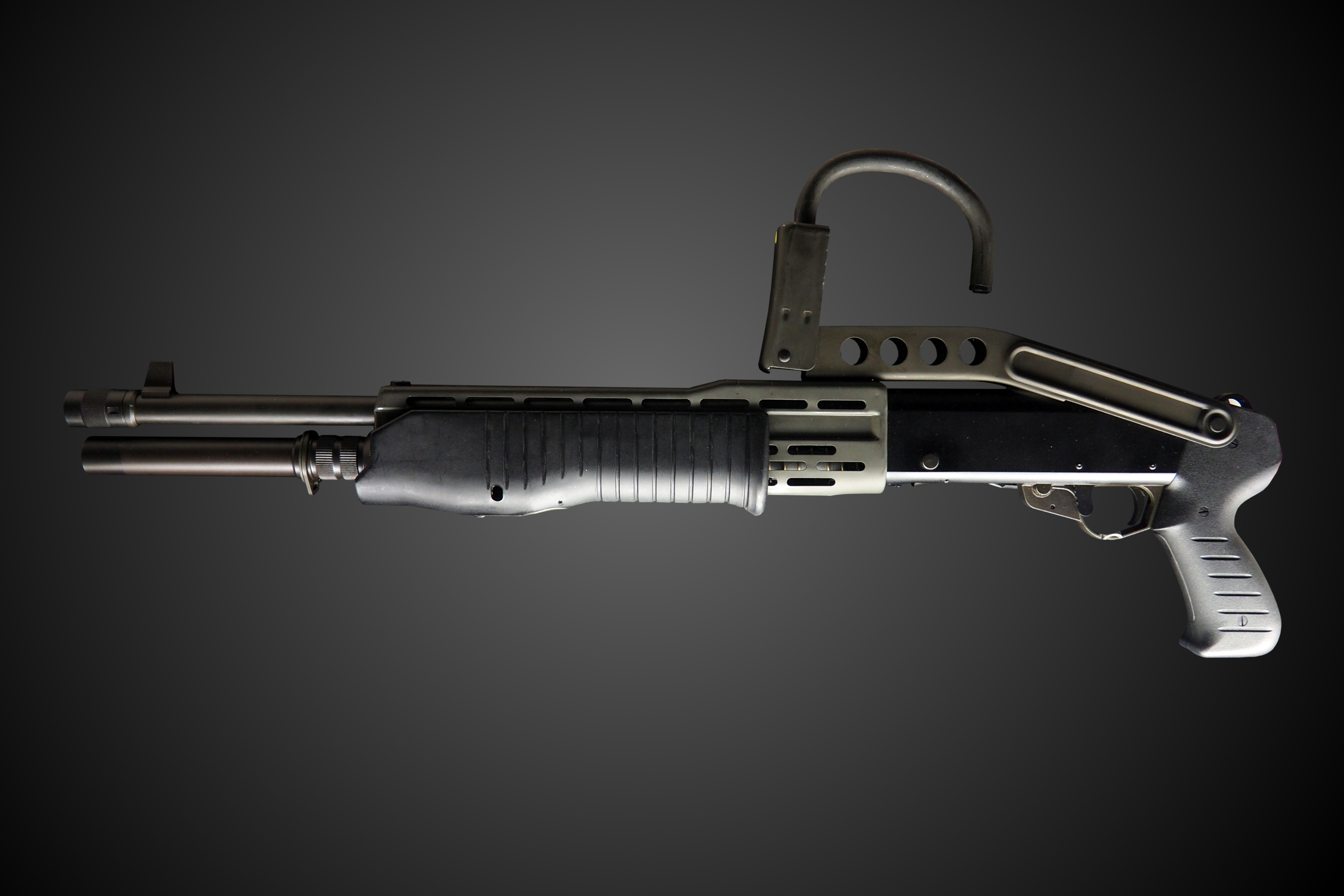
Franchi SPAS-12 with butt hook attached to stock

In the United States, there were two importers of SPAS-12 shotguns. Importation of the SPAS-12 into the United States began in 1982 and ended in 1989 under F.I.E. Corp. In 1989, F.I.E. suffered from major losses in sales due to the president's importation ban, which was a reinterpretation of 18 U.S.C. 925(d)(3) that required firearms to have a "sporting purpose" in order to be imported.

In 1990 American Arms incorporated purchased all remaining inventories of parts and SPAS-12 shotguns from the now-bankrupt F.I.E Corp and began the re-importation of the Franchi SPAS-12 as the (Sporting Purpose Automatic Shotgun) under newly approved restrictions until 1994. The ATF allowed the importation of a SPAS-12 variant from American Arms because its size, weight, bulk and modified configuration were such that it was particularly suitable for traditional shooting sports.

The SPAS-12 was tested by the U.S. Coast Guard and showed promising results but again was not considered cost-effective for a contract over other available suppliers. The Assault Weapons Ban of September 1994 caused American Arms to stop the importation of the SPAS-12 with major losses of sales due to the legal restrictions invoked by the U.S. Assault Weapons Ban.

Both importers placed numerous additional orders for the SPAS-12 that were never complete due to U.S. restrictions throughout importation. This was the reason for such few numbers of shotguns imported into the United States. The SPAS-12 was featured in major films such as The Terminator and Jurassic Park, which likely contributed to increased popularity in the civilian market.

=== Legality ===
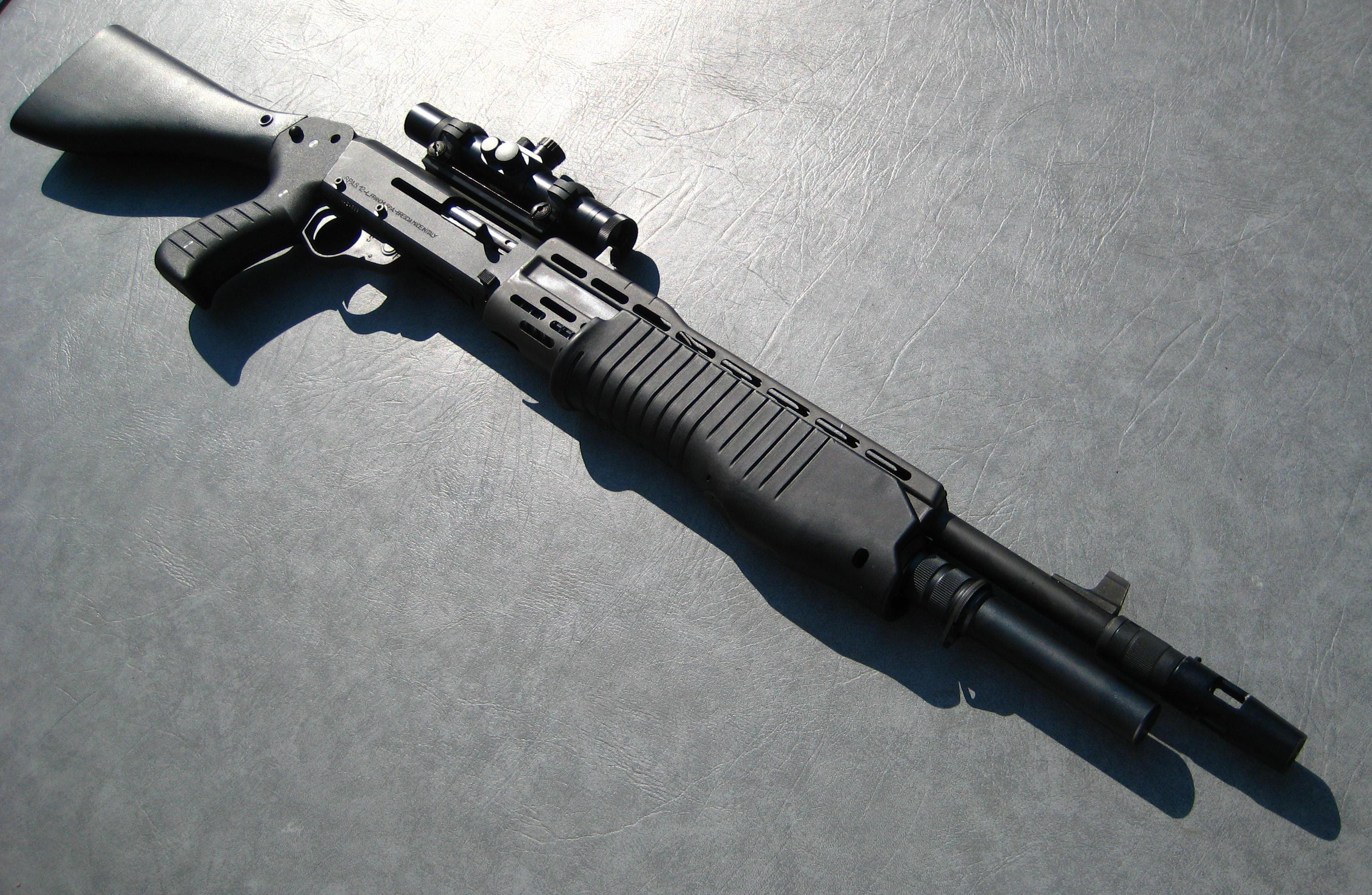
SPAS-12 with a fixed stock, a scope, & a shot diverter

In the United States, between September 1994 and September 2004, the Federal Assault Weapons Ban prohibited the transfer and possession of SPAS-12 shotguns manufactured after 13 September 1994. The ban sunset on 13 September 2004 and is no longer in force. However, some U.S. States and territories currently maintain similar bans, including California, Connecticut, District of Columbia, Maryland, Massachusetts, New Jersey, and New York.

== Users ==
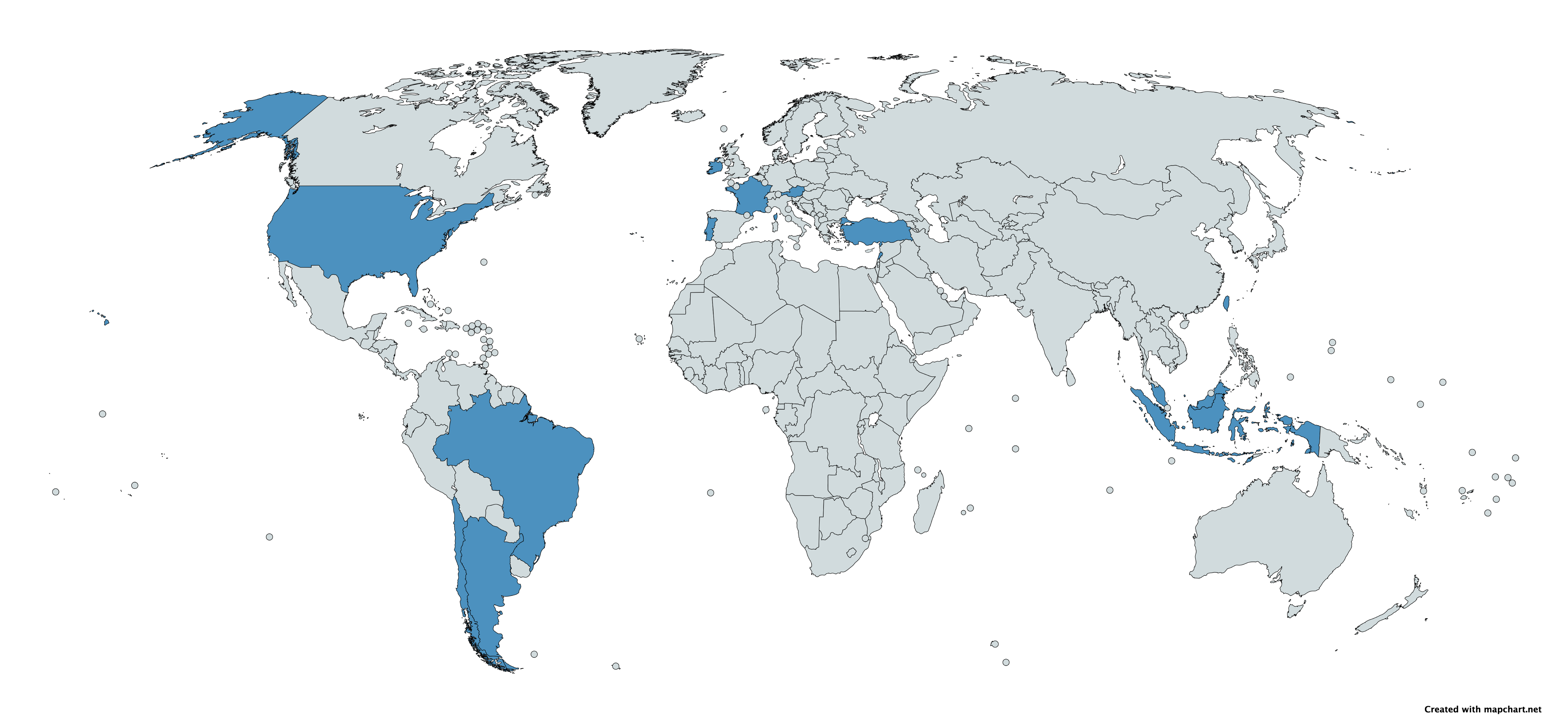
A map with SPAS-12 users in blue

- Argentina: Used by Brigada Especial Operativa Halcón.
- Austria: Used by EKO Cobra.
- Brazil: Used by Grupo de Ações Táticas Especiais (GATE).
- Chile: Chilean Gendarmerie
- Egypt: used by military police alongside Franchi PA-3
- France: Used by GIGN
- Indonesia: Komando Pasukan Katak (Kopaska) tactical group and Komando Pasukan Khusus (Kopassus) special forces group.
- Ireland: Used by the Army Ranger Wing.
- Lebanon: Used by police and army.
- Malaysia: National Special Operations Force.
- Morocco: Used by the Royal Gendarmerie.
- Portugal: Used by the Portuguese Armed Forces.
- Taiwan
- Turkey: Turkish Gendarmerie.
- United States: Used by police SWAT teams.

=== Non-state users ===
- Lebanese Forces
- Provisional Irish Republican Army
- Myanmar People's Defence Force: Seen in use by PDF forces in the Tanintharyi Region.

== See also ==
- Benelli M4
- List of shotguns

== Notes ==
^aThe push-button cross bolt safety has also been known to fail and release the hammer when depressing the trigger on the safe and it is recommended that the secondary Quick Employment Safety (lever tab on the left side of the trigger) is used on both the newer and older style trigger groups in place of the lever or cross bolt safety's to prevent accidental discharge.
^bThe LAW-12 and SAS-12 models were known to have no import markings on the receiver but are actually marked by the importer on the barrel itself.
