= Compañía de Tropas de Operaciones Especiales =

Special Operations Troops Company Compañía de Tropas de Operaciones Especiales
- Abbreviation: TOE

Agency overview
- Formed: 4 May 1990

Jurisdictional structure
- Operations jurisdiction: Argentine
- General nature: Local civilian police
- Specialist jurisdiction: Counter terrorism, special weapons operations; protection of internationally protected persons, other very important persons, or state property

Operational structure
- Parent agency: Santa Fe Provincial Police

Compañía de Tropas de Operaciones Especiales (Special Operations Troops Company, TOE) is the premier special operations force of the Santa Fe Province Police, Argentina.

== History ==
The service was created on 4 May 1990, and depends directly of the Chief of the Province Police.

== Training ==
Agents of the unit were heavily trained in different international centers, such as the British NCIS, and the Israel Yamam; also its personnel have received specialized formation in many Latin American countries.

== Equipment ==
The TOE uses weapons and gear such as:

Weapon	Origin	Type
Bersa Thunder 9	Argentina	Semi-automatic pistol
Ithaca 37	United States	Shotgun
FMK-3	Argentina	Submachine gun
Steyr AUG	Austria	Submachine gun
FN FAL	Argentina	Assault rifle
Remington 700	United States	Sniper rifle

== See also ==
- Scorpion Group
- Albatross Group
- Hawk Special Operations Brigade
- Federal Special Operations Group
- Santa Fe Province Police
