= Grupo Alacrán =

Scorpion Group
- Grupo Alacrán (Spanish)
- Active: 1952–present
- Country: Argentina
- Agency: Argentine National Gendarmerie
- Type: Police tactical unit
- Headquarters: Evita City

The Grupo Alacrán (Scorpion Group) is a police tactical unit of the Argentine National Gendarmerie, often referred as the Equipo Antiterrorista de Gendarmería (Gendarmerie Counter-terrorism Team).

== History ==
The Grupo Alacrán was formed as the Escuadrón Alacrán (Scorpion Squadron) on 30 May 1986. It traces its origins to a unit of gendarmes who fought in the Falklands War using commando tactics.

== Organisation ==
The division is headquartered in Evita City and responds to high-risk and counterterrorist situations throughout Argentina, but primarily in the rural areas.

They also provide limited dignitary protection for government officials traveling in these areas. The members of this unit wear green berets with unit insignia.

== Equipment ==
The basic gear for every Alacrán officer is a standard assault rifle or SMG and pistol. Alacrán Group would gain other weaponry including shotguns and sniper rifles depend on the situation encountered.

The following are the common weapons used by Alacrán Group:

- Berreta 92
- Glock 17
- Heckler & Koch MP5
- FN P90
- Franchi SPAS-15
- FN FAL
- M4 carbine
- Mk 18
- M24 Sniper Weapon System
- Barrett M95

== See also ==
- Albatross Group
- Hawk Special Operations Brigade
- Federal Special Operations Group
- Special Operations Troops Company
- Argentine Federal Police
