= Córdoba Provincial Police =

Córdoba Provincial Police Policía de la Provincia de Córdoba

Agency overview
- Formed: November 16, 1860; 165 years ago
- Employees: 20,000

Jurisdictional structure
- General nature: Local civilian police

Operational structure
- Headquarters: Córdoba, Argentina
- Agency executive: Héctor Gutiérrez, Commissioner
- Parent agency: Ministry of Security of Córdoba Province

The Córdoba Provincial Police (Spanish: Policía de la Provincia de Córdoba) is an Argentine police agency, responsible for policing the Córdoba province.
