= Franchi SPAS-15 =

Italian combat shotgun

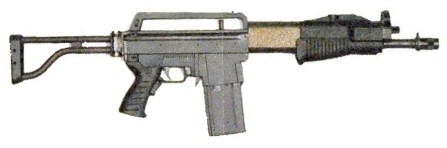
- SPAS-15
- Type: Combat shotgun
- Place of origin: Italy

Service history
- In service: 1986–present
- Used by: See Users
- Wars: Lebanese Civil War

Production history
- Designer: Franchi
- Designed: 1984
- Manufacturer: Franchi
- Produced: 1986–2005
- Variants: SPAS-16

Specifications
- Mass: 3.9 kg (8.5 lb) empty
- Length: 1000 mm (39 in), stock extended; 750 mm (30 in), stock folded
- Barrel length: 450 mm (18 in)
- Cartridge: 12 gauge
- Action: Pump-action/gas-actuated, rotating bolt
- Rate of fire: Semi-automatic; Full-automatic (SPAS-16)
- Effective firing range: 40 m (130 ft)
- Feed system: 3 or 6-round detachable box magazine

The Franchi SPAS-15 is a dual-mode 12 gauge combat shotgun manufactured by the Italian company Luigi Franchi S.P.A.

== Design ==
The weapon is based on the SPAS-12, and has similar pump-action/semi-automatic firing modes. In semi-automatic mode, a gas piston drives a bolt carrier and rotating bolt. In pump-action mode, the same components are driven by sliding the fore-end backwards. Pump-action mode is required to reliably fire low-pressure (less lethal) ammunition such as tear gas rounds or less-lethal bean bags. Switching between firing modes is done by pressing a button above the foregrip, and sliding the foregrip slightly forwards or backwards. The barrel is chrome lined and features screw-in choke tubes.

Unlike its predecessor, the SPAS-15 is fed by a detachable box magazine. The gun features either a fixed black wooden stock or a side folding metal stock. Both had the same pistol grip safety.

Additionally, a full-auto variant, the SPAS-16 was manufactured in small numbers.

Amongst Italian troops the weapon is known by the nickname "La Chiave dell'Incursore" (the key of the commando) because it is used to blast the locks of closed doors.

== Legality ==
In Italy, the SPAS-15 is a common weapon for both law enforcement and civilians.

In Canada, the SPAS-15 is classified as a Prohibited Weapon and cannot be legally owned or imported except under very limited circumstances.

In 1994, the United States banned the importation of the SPAS-15 with close to 180 shotguns imported, but later abolished the relevant regulations.

== Users ==
- Argentina: Used by Grupo Alacrán.
- Brazil: Used by BOPE, BFEsp, Federal Highway Police and Military Police GRT unit. Small numbers were also acquired by Federal Police in 2002 but retired due to reliability issues.
- India: National Security Guard.
- Italy: 2,000 acquired in 1999 by the Italian Army. Also used by the Carabinieri.
- Israel: Israeli special forces
- Malaysia
- Portugal: Portuguese Army.

=== Non-state users ===
- Lebanese Forces

== See also ==
- List of shotguns
