= Brigada Especial Operativa Halcón =

Buenos Aires police tactical unit

Hawk Special Operation Brigade Brigada Especial Operativa Halcón
- Abbreviation: BEOH

Jurisdictional structure
- Operations jurisdiction: Argentine
- General nature: Local civilian police
- Specialist jurisdiction: Counter terrorism, special weapons operations; protection of internationally protected persons, other very important persons, or state property

Operational structure
- Parent agency: Buenos Aires Provincial Police

The Brigada Especial Operativa Halcón (BEOH; Hawk Special Operations Brigade) is a special operations division of the Buenos Aires Provincial Police in Argentina.

== History ==
Argentina did not possess a viable counter-terrorist capability until 1978, when it hosted the football World Cup.

At that time, the military dictatorship ruling Argentina accepted the possibility that such a widely televised event was a likely forum for a terrorist incident.

The result was the formation of a special counter-terrorist team, the Brigada Halcón.

This special operations group was involved in the "Ramallo massacre", when operatives from the Brigada Halcón shot dead one alleged bank robber and his two hostages.

== Formation ==
Today, the unit is made up of seventy-five commandos, subdivided into fifteen-man tactical teams.

Each team has two snipers, one medic, one negotiator, an explosive ordnance disposal expert, a communications specialist, an intelligence specialist, and eight tactical assaulters.

While many current members are veterans of the Argentine Army, the Brigada Halcón is under the operational control of the federal police, under the direct command of the Buenos Aires Police Department.

== Training ==
Initial training is divided into three two-month stages. Skills such as combat shooting, heliborne insertion, HALO/HAHO parachuting, explosives, sniping, intelligence gathering, martial arts, and offensive driving are covered in this period. The unit also handles VIP protection and is also responsible for hijacked aircraft throughout the nation.

== Equipment ==
Brigada Halcón members use foreign weapons and gear, as well as locally manufactured protective gear and uniforms.

- Bersa Thunder 9
- Glock 17
- Uzi
- Heckler & Koch MP5
- CZ Scorpion Evo 3
- Franchi SPAS-12
- FN FAL
- Steyr AUG
- SIG Sauer SIG516
- CZ BREN 2
- Heckler & Koch PSG1
- Barrett M82

== See also ==
- Grupo Alacrán
- Grupo Albatros
- Grupo Especial de Operaciones Federales
- Compañía de Tropas de Operaciones Especiales
- Policía Federal Argentina
