= Argentine Federal Penitentiary Service =

The Argentine Federal Penitentiary Service (Spanish: Servicio Penitenciario Federal Argentino, SPF) is an Argentine federal agency responsible for the administration of the national prison system.

The legal unification of the prison system occurred by Decree Law No. 412 of January 14, 1958, which was ratified on October 23 of that year.
