= Halcón M-1943 =

Halcón M-1943 submachine gun
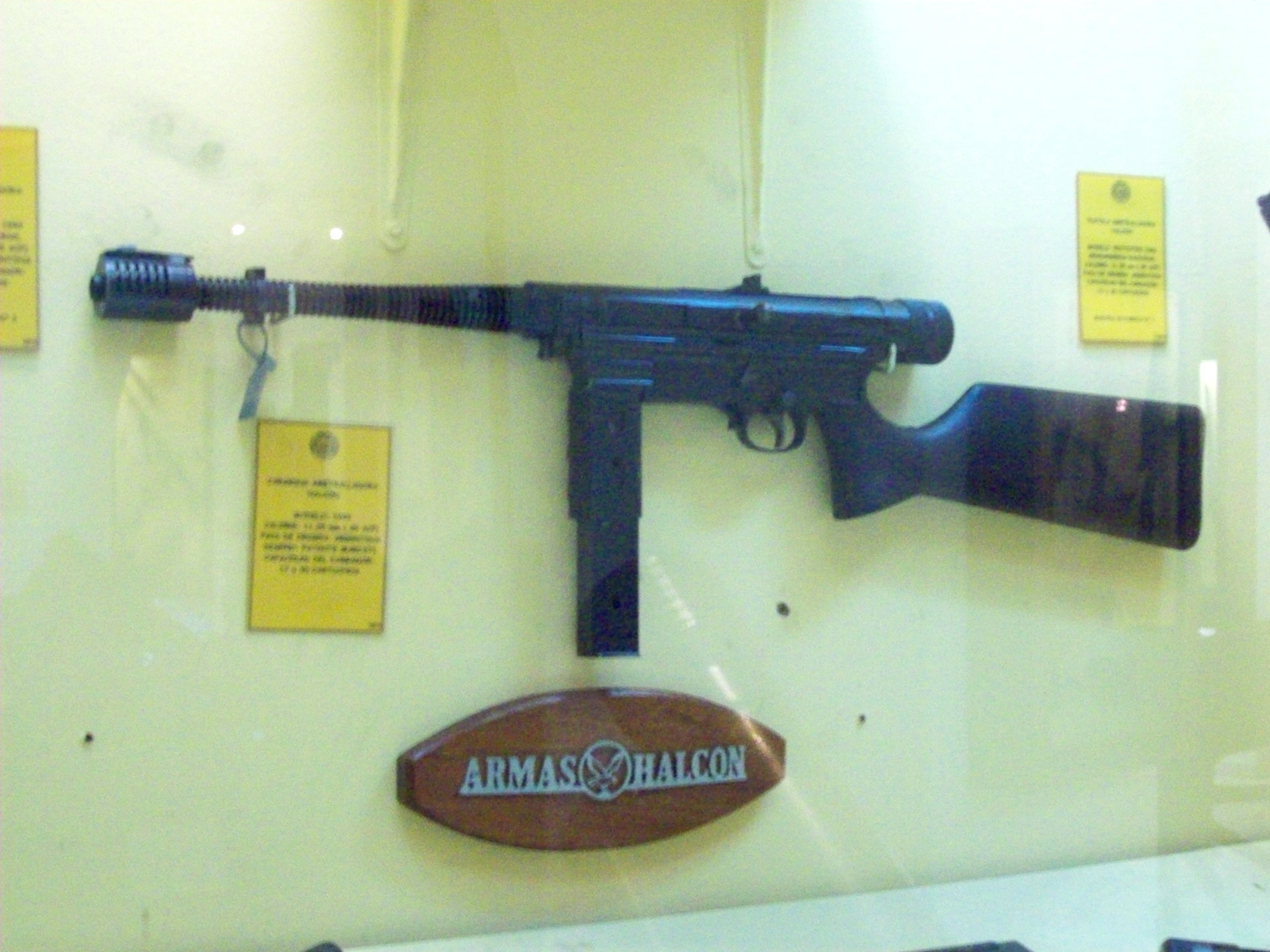
- Type: Submachine gun
- Place of origin: Argentina

Production history
- Designed: 1943
- Manufacturer: Fábrica de armas Halcón
- Produced: 1943
- Variants: See "Variants"

Specifications
- Mass: 4.75 kg
- Length: 850 mm
- Barrel length: 292 mm
- Cartridge: 9×19mm Parabellum.45 ACP
- Caliber: 9mm.45
- Action: Blowback
- Rate of fire: 700 rpm
- Effective firing range: 200 m
- Feed system: 30/36/40 round box magazines (Depending on variants)
- Sights: Iron

The Halcón M-1943 is a submachine gun of Argentine origin and is chambered in both 9×19mm Parabellum, used by the Argentine Army, and in .45 ACP for the police, though neither used it in front-line roles.
