= Argentine National Gendarmerie =

Internal security of Argentina'a armed forces

Argentine National Gendarmerie Gendarmería Nacional Argentina
- Emblem of the Force

- Gendarmeria flag
- Abbreviation: GNA
- Motto: Centinela de la Patria (lit. 'Homeland's Sentinel')

Agency overview
- Formed: 1938
- Employees: 75,000
- Volunteers: All non commissioned personnel are volunteers.

Jurisdictional structure
- Federal agency (Operations jurisdiction): Argentina
- Operations jurisdiction: Argentina
- Legal jurisdiction: As per operations jurisdiction
- General nature: Federal law enforcement; Gendarmerie

Operational structure
- Headquarters: Ave. Antártida Argentina and Gendarmería Nacional St., Buenos Aires
- Elected officer responsible: Patricia Bullrich, Minister of Security
- Agency executives: Commandant General Andrés Severino, National Director of the Gendarmerie; Commandant General Javier Alberto Lapalma, Deputy National Director
- Regional Headquarters: 5: Campo de Mayo; Córdoba San Miguel de Tucumán; Rosario; Bahía Blanca

Website
- argentina.gob.ar/gendarmeria

The Argentine National Gendarmerie (Spanish: Gendarmería Nacional Argentina, GNA) is the national gendarmerie force and corps of border guards of the Argentine Republic. As at 2011, It has a strength of 30,000

The gendarmerie is primarily a frontier guard force but also fulfils other important roles. The force functions from what are today five regional headquarters at Campo de Mayo, Córdoba, Rosario, San Miguel de Tucumán and Bahía Blanca.

== Personnel and training ==
Non-commissioned personnel of the gendarmerie are all volunteers and receive their training in the force's own comprehensive system of training institutions. Officers graduate after a three-year course at the National Gendarmerie Academy. Both officers and non-commissioned personnel have access to the specialist training establishments of the Army.

== History ==
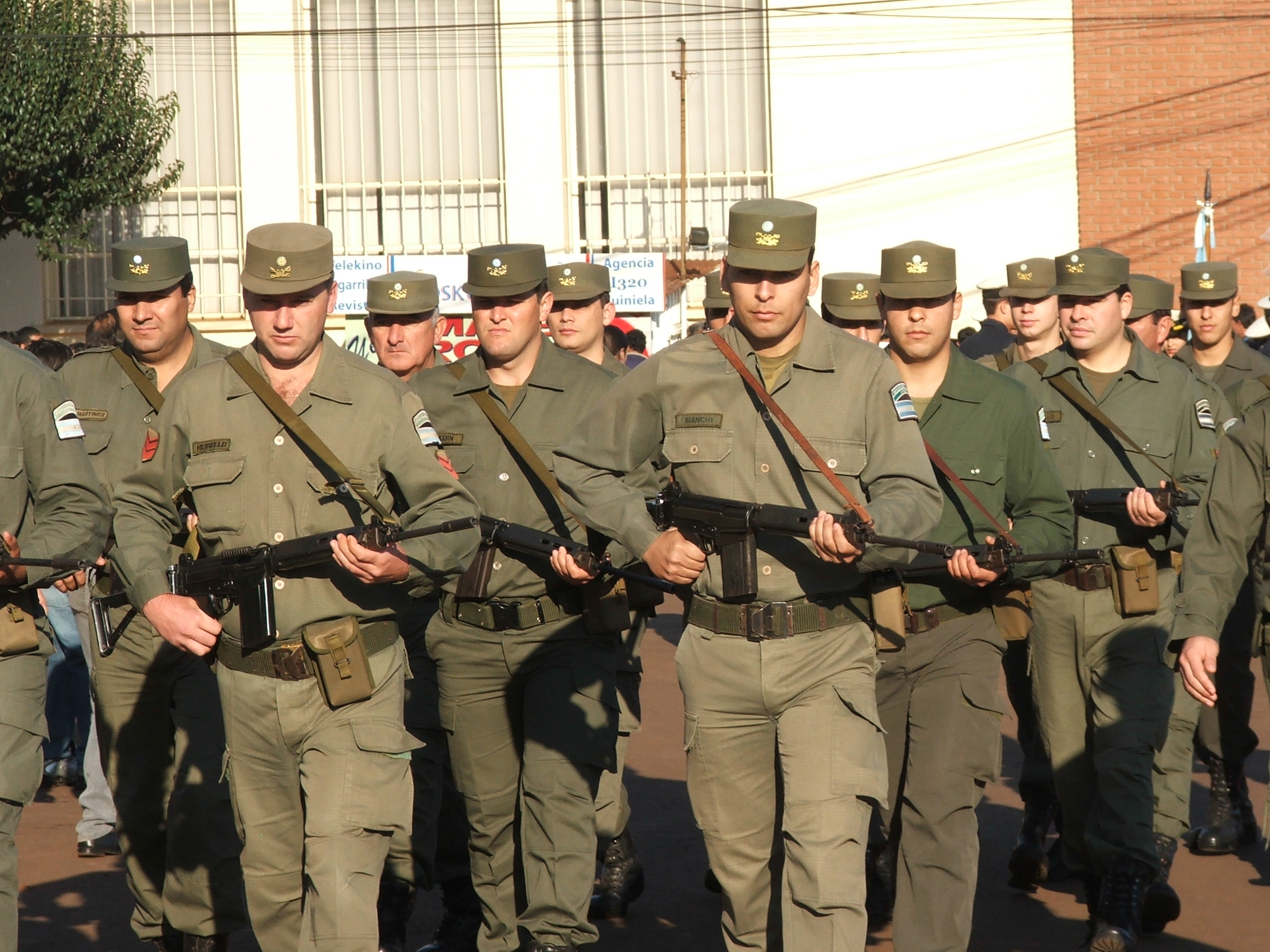
Argentine Gendarmes in Oberá in Misiones

The gendarmerie was created in 1938 by the National Congress and replaced the regiments of the Army which previously fulfilled the gendarmerie's missions. The gendarmerie was particularly tasked with providing security in isolated and sparsely populated frontier regions which had only been settled relatively recently. In many senses the gendarmerie may still be considered an adjunct of the Argentine Army.

== Activities ==
The gendarmerie's mission and functions are concerned with both domestic security and national defense. According to Laws No. 23.554 and 24.059, the armed forces cannot intervene in internal civil conflicts, except in logistics’ and support roles, so the gendarmerie is subordinate to the Ministry of Security. It is defined as a civilian "security force of a military nature". It maintains a functional relationship with the minister of defense, as part of both the National Defense System and the Interior Security System. It therefore maintains capabilities arising from the demands required by joint military planning with the armed forces.

The gendarmerie's main missions are:

- Providing security for Argentina's borders
- Providing security for places of national strategic importance (e.g. nuclear plants)

The gendarmerie is also used for other security missions, which include:

- Policing missions:
  - Assisting provincial police services in maintaining public security in rural areas
  - Preventing smuggling
  - Fighting drug trafficking
  - Fighting terrorism
  - Fighting crimes "against life and freedom" (children and organs trade, slavery, etc.)
  - Dealing with economic crime
  - Dealing with environmental crime
  - Dealing with illegal immigration
- Military missions:
  - War-fighting missions (e.g. in the Falklands War)
  - Peacekeeping or humanitarian aid missions under the United Nations
  - Providing security for Argentine embassies and consulates in several foreign nations

Under the United Nations, the Gendarmerie has served in Guatemala, Bosnia and Herzegovina, Croatia, Angola, Lebanon, Rwanda, Liberia, Cyprus, South Sudan, Haiti and Colombia.

== Organization ==
=== High command ===
The high command includes:

- The national director: As of 2021, the national director is Commandant-General Andrés Severino.
- The deputy national director: As of 2021, the deputy national director is Commandant-General Javier Alberto Lapalma.
- The General and Special Staff of the National Directorate of the Gendarmerie.

=== Rank structure ===
Officer ranks

Rank group	General / flag officers			Senior officers			Junior officers
Argentine National Gendarmerie
Argentine National Gendarmerie	Director Nacional	Subdirector Nacional	Comandante General	Comandante Mayor	Comandante Principal	Comandante	Segundo Comandante	Primer Alférez	Alférez	Subalferez

The ranks up to and including Segundo Comandante are classified as Subaltern Officers (Oficiales Subalternos). Gendarmerie officers wear the same insignia as the equivalent Argentine Army rank. The National Director and his Deputy wear the insignia of an Argentine Lieutenant-General and Divisional General respectively, although they still have the rank of Commandant-General. (NB: Lieutenant-General is the highest Argentine Army rank.)

Other ranks

Rank group	Senior NCOs					Junior NCOs		Enlisted
Argentine National Gendarmerie								No insignia
Argentine National Gendarmerie	Suboficial Mayor	Suboficial Principal	Sargento Ayudante	Sargento Primero	Sargento	Cabo Primero	Cabo	Gendarme

The ranks up to and including sergeant are classified as Subaltern Sub-Officers (Suboficiales Subalternos), and the remainder are classified as Superior Sub-Officers (Suboficiales Superiores). The sub-officer ranks are the same as Argentine army ranks, and wear the same insignia, but with a much thicker gold band for a Gendarmerie Principal Sub-Officer than is used in the Army.

=== Unit structure ===
- A Section (Spanish: pelotón) is a squad of several men.
- A Group (Spanish: grupo) consists of several sections and is the basic operational unit of the Gendarmerie.
- A Squadron (Spanish: escuadrón) consists of three groups.
- A Grouping (Spanish: agrupación) consists of several squadrons. This may be thought of as roughly corresponding to the level of command of a battalion or regiment.
- Above the groupings are the regional commands and the staff of the National Directorate.

=== Operational units ===
- Regional Headquarters
- Mobile Units
- Special Forces Units: Grupo Alacrán
- Intelligence Squadron
- Highway Security Sections
- Environment Protection Service
- Mountain Rescue Groups
- Scrubland Special Section: Grupo MONTE

=== Support units ===
- Logistics Squadron
- Telecommunications and Computer Service
- Expert Investigation Service
- Aviation Service
- Medical Assistance Service

== Equipment ==
=== Firearms ===
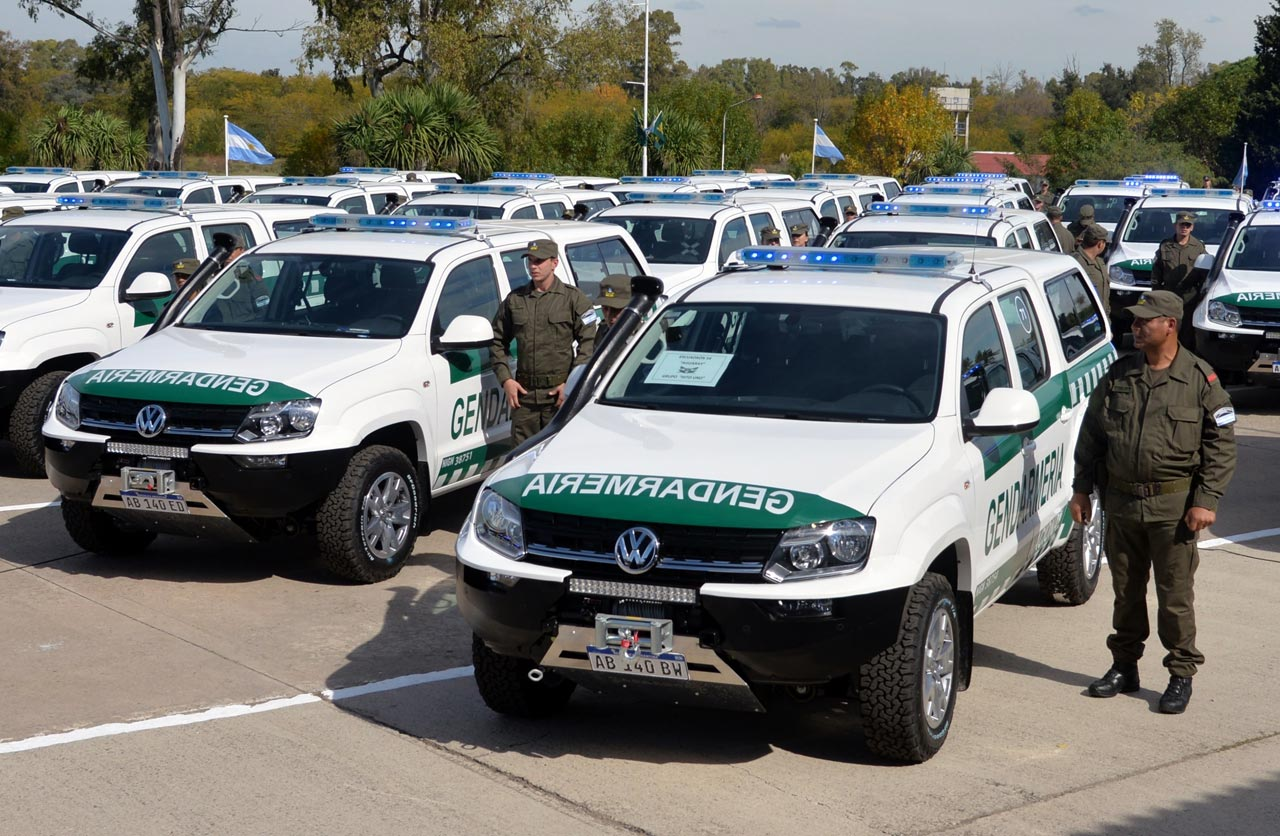
Volkswagen Amarok of Gendarmería Nacional Argentina

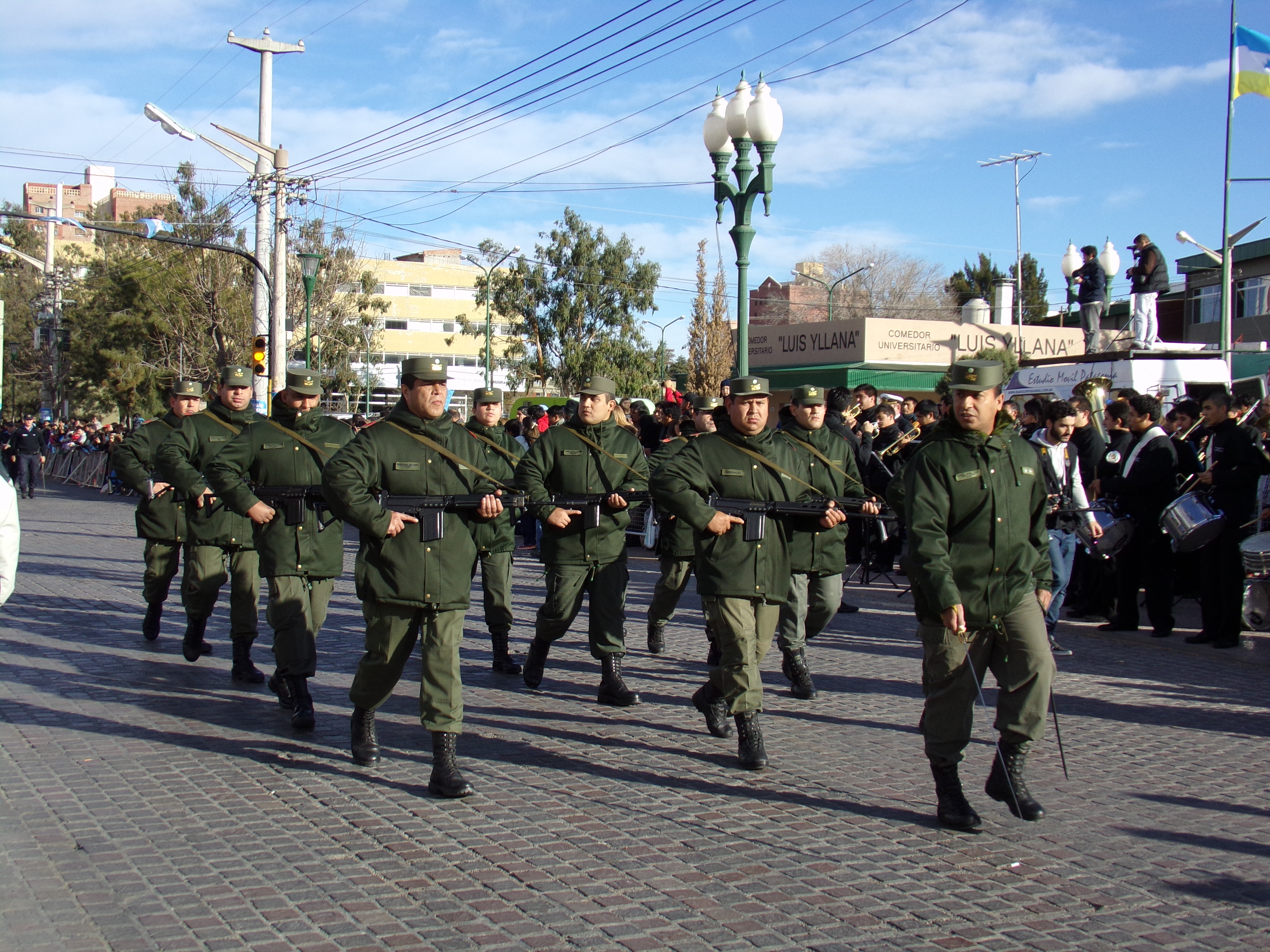
Gendarmes with FN FAL rifle

Weapon	Caliber	Origin	Notes
Pistols
Beretta 92	9×19mm	Italy	Service pistol
Glock 17	9×19mm	Austria	Used by the Grupo Alacrán
Browning Hi-power	9×19mm	United States	
Submachine Guns
FMK-3	9×19mm	Argentina	Service SMG
Heckler & Koch MP5	9×19mm	Germany	
FN P90	FN 5.7×28mm	Belgium	Used by the Grupo Alacrán
Assault Rifles & Battle Rifles
FN FAL	7.62×51mm	Belgium/Argentina	Standard service rifle
Steyr AUG	5.56×45mm	Austria	
Colt M4	5.56×45mm	United States	Used by the Grupo Alacrán
Sniper Rifles & Machine guns
M24 SWS	7.62×51mm	United States	Standard sniper rifle
Barrett M95	.50 BMG	United States	Used by the Grupo Alacrán
FN MAG	7.62×51mm	Belgium/Argentina	
Shotguns
Ithaca 37	12 gauge	United States	Standard service shotgun
Mossberg 500-A	12 gauge	United States	Standard service shotgun
Valtro PM-5	12 gauge	Italy	
Benelli M3	12 gauge	Italy	
SPAS-15	12 gauge	Italy	Used by the Grupo Alacrán

=== Vehicles ===
Model	Type	Origin	Notes
Ford Focus	Police car	United States/Argentina	
Renault Megane	Police car	France/Argentina	
Ford Ranger	Pickup truck	United States/Argentina	
Volkswagen Amarok	Pickup truck	Germany/Argentina	
Agrale Marrua	Pickup truck	Brazil	
Land Rover Defender	Pickup truck	United Kingdom	
Iveco Daily	Van	Italy/Argentina	
Mercedes-Benz Sprinter	Van	Germany/Argentina	
Mercedes-Benz Unimog	Truck	Germany	
Iveco VM 90	Truck	Italy	
Bandvagn 206	All-terrain vehicle	Sweden	
STREIT Group Spartan	Armoured personnel carrier	Canada	Used by the Grupo Alacrán

=== Aircraft ===
The service has a small inventory of aircraft, based at Campo de Mayo.

- Eurocopter EC135
- Eurocopter AS350 Ecureuil
- Pilatus PC-12/47E
- Pilatus PC-6B/H2
- AgustaWestland AW119 Koala
- AgustaWestland AW169

== See also ==
- Laguna del Desierto incident
- Foreign relations of Argentina
- Argentine Naval Prefecture
- Argentine Federal Police
