= Grupo Especial de Operaciones Federales (Argentina) =

Argentine police tactical unit

Federal Operations Special Groups Grupo Especial de Operaciones Federales
- Abbreviation: GEOF

Agency overview
- Formed: 1994

Jurisdictional structure
- Operations jurisdiction: Argentine
- General nature: Civilian police
- Specialist jurisdiction: Counter terrorism, special weapons operations; protection of internationally protected persons, other very important persons, or state property

Operational structure
- Parent agency: Argentine Federal Police

The Grupo Especial de Operaciones Federales (Federal Operations Special Group, GEOF) is a police tactical unit of the Policía Federal Argentina trained to strategically perform counterterrorist and counternarcotics missions. It is also used for VIP protection and hostage rescue situations.

== History ==
The GEOF is a specialized police unit of the General Directorate of International Terrorism and Complex Crimes.

Although the existence of special forces in Argentina begins in 1930, the unit was officially created after the 1994 AMIA bombing.

In 1994 its first section was established in Tucumán and in 1997 a second division was constituted in Rosario. In the next year the Buenos Aires group was formed.

== Training ==
The unit's main training course stands for 20 weeks and is divided in two periods, with only 15% common approvals. Topics include sniping, HALO/HAHO parachuting, martial arts, offensive driving, and explosives, known as the "brechero" one.

The GEOF constantly trains with special units of other countries like the FBI Hostage Rescue Team, the US Army Green Berets, the Israeli Yamam and numerous SWAT groups.

== Power ==
The GEOF, nicknamed 4T (todo tiempo-todo terreno, all weather-all terrain), has full powers in all jurisdictions of the country.

== Equipment ==
The basic gear for every GEOF officer is a standard sidearm and an assault rifle. GEOF would gain other weaponry including shotguns, sniper rifles, and even machine guns (in some units) depend on the situation encountered.

The following are the common weapons used by GEOF:

=== Firearms ===
| Weapon | Origin | Type |
|---|---|---|
| Bersa Thunder 9 | Argentina | Semi-automatic pistol |
| Glock 17 | Austria | Semi-automatic pistol |
| Beretta 92 | Italy | Semi-automatic pistol |
| Heckler & Koch USP | Germany | Semi-automatic pistol |
| Heckler & Koch MP5 | Germany | Submachine gun |
| Remington 870 | United States | Shotgun |
| SIG SG 552 Commando | Switzerland | Assault rifle |
| IWI ACE | Israel | Assault rifle |
| FN FAL | Argentina | Battle rifle |
| FN Minimi | Belgium | Machine gun |
| FN MAG | Belgium | Machine gun |
| IWI Negev | Israel | Machine gun |
| M24 SWS | United States | Sniper rifle |
| H-S Precision HTR | United States | Sniper rifle |
| M110 SASS | United States | Sniper rifle |

=== Vehicles ===
- Iveco Daily
- Ford Ranger
- BDX
- Dongfeng CSK-131
