= Sabina Frederic =

Argentine anthropologist and politician

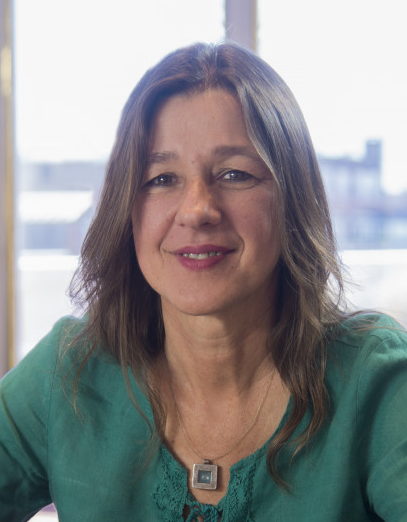
- Frederic in 2019

Minister of Security
- In office 10 December 2019 – 20 September 2021
- President: Alberto Fernández
- Preceded by: Patricia Bullrich
- Succeeded by: Aníbal Fernández

Personal details
- Born: 13 October 1965 (age 61) Buenos Aires, Argentina
- Party: Independent; Frente de Todos (since 2019)
- Education: University of Buenos Aires; Utrecht University (PhD)

Sabina Andrea Frederic (Spanish pronunciation: [saˈβina anˈdɾea ˈfɾeðeɾik]; born 13 October 1965) is an Argentine social anthropologist, university professor and politician. A specialist on military and security personnel, she was Argentina's Minister of Security from 2019 to 2021, in the cabinet of President Alberto Fernández.

Since 2021, she has chaired the White Helmets Commission.

== Early life and career ==
Frederic was born on 13 October 1965 in Buenos Aires. She studied anthropology at the University of Buenos Aires and after obtaining her licenciatura, she went on to complete a PhD in social anthropology at Utrecht University in the Netherlands. She was a permanent faculty member of the National University of Quilmes starting in 2005, and is an independent researcher at CONICET, where she has specialized on the subject of morality and emotion in the configuration of military and security forces in modern Argentina.

Frederic was appointed undersecretary of training in the Ministry of Defense in 2009, a position she held until 2011. From 2012 to 2014, she worked as an advisor in the Ministry of Security in the administration of Nilda Garré.

In 2017, Frederic joined the Frente Federal Ciencia y Universidad, a collective of scientists and intellectuals opposed to the budget cuts and austerity measures imposed on universities and scientific institutions by the government of President Mauricio Macri.

== Minister of Security ==
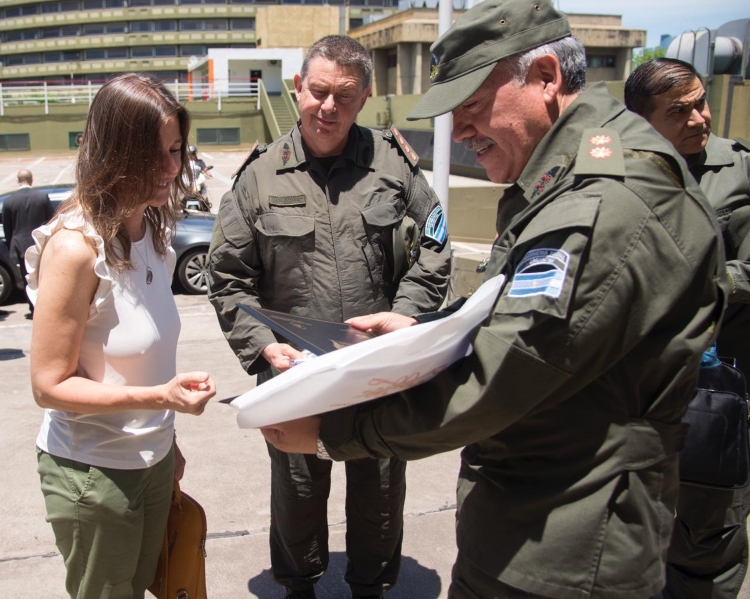
Frederic visiting National Gendarmerie headquarters in Buenos Aires, December 2019.

On 6 December 2019, President-elect Alberto Fernández announced his intention of appointing Frederic as security minister, succeeding Patricia Bullrich; Frederic positioned herself as a staunch opponent of Bullrich's security policies. She assumed office alongside the rest of Fernández's cabinet on 10 December 2019.

On 24 December, she published Resolution 1231/19, which reversed many of Bullrich's policies in the Minisitry: she overturned the previous protocols on the use of firearms by security forces and mandated the creation of a protocol on the use of taser guns; additionally, the resolution annulled the program overseeing offenders in the railway system and the 1149 Protocol, which "allowed security forces to harm the rights of LGBT citizens".

Policy-wise, Frederic has been vocal about her support for the decriminalization of marijuana for personal use.

In April 2020, Frederic stated that the ministry would continue her predecessor's policy of cyber surveillance to measure "social humour"; these statements were widely criticized by social organizations and the Opposition.

Following the government's poor showings in the 2021 legislative primary elections, Frederic was replaced by Aníbal Fernández as part of a cabinet reshuffle.

== Publications ==
Publications with Frederic as author or co-author include the following:

- Federalismo y descentralización en grandes ciudades. Prometeo Libros. 2004. ISBN 978-950-9217-72-0. (co-authored with Marcelo Escolar and Gustavo Badía)
- Buenos vecinos, malos políticos. Prometeo Libros. 2004. ISBN 978-950-9217-83-6.
- Los usos de la fuerza pública. Universidad Nacional de General Sarmiento. 2008. ISBN 978-987-630-033-9.
- Las trampas del pasado. Fondo de Cultura Económica. 2013. ISBN 978-950-557-992-1.
- Fuerzas Armadas en democracia. Percepciones de los militares argentinos sobre su reconocimiento. Prohistoria Ediciones. 2015. ISBN 978-987-3864-05-6. (co-authored with Laura Masson and Germán Soprano)
- Cultura y política en etnografías sobre la Argentina. Universidad Nacional de Quilmes. 2017. ISBN 978-987-558-494-5. (co-authored with Germán Soprano, Beatriz Ocampo and Carlos Kuz)

Political offices
Preceded by Patricia Bullrich	Minister of Security; 2019–2021	Succeeded by Aníbal Fernández
