= Iván Velásquez =

Iván Velásquez or Velázquez may refer to:

- Iván Velázquez Caballero (born 1970), Mexican drug lord, a.k.a. "El Talibán"
- Iván Germán Velázquez (born 1979), Argentine military officer, Director of Counterintelligence, political exile
- Iván Velásquez Gómez (born 1955), Colombian lawyer and diplomat, Minister of National Defence since 2022
- Iván Velásquez (footballer) (born 1976), Colombian footballer
