= Pascual Berrone =

Spanish-Argentine business economist and professor

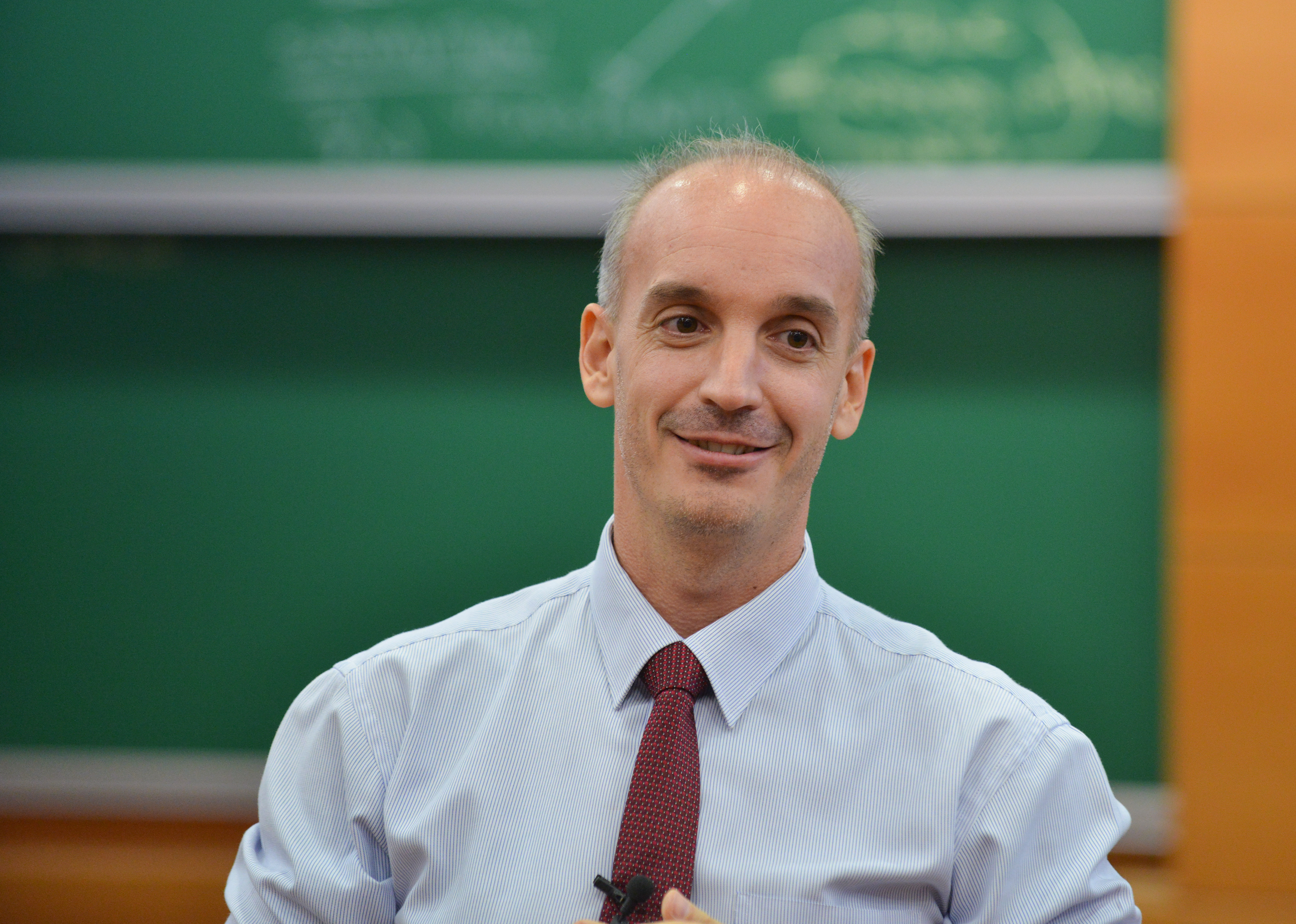
- Born: 1975 (age 49–50); Mar del Plata, Argentina
- Education: PhD in Business Economics and Quantitative Methods (Carlos III University)
- Occupation(s): Researcher, Professor
- Employer: IESE Business School
- Organization: Universidad de Navarra
- Website: citiesinmotion

Pascual Berrone (Mar del Plata, 1975) is a Spanish-Argentine professor, author, and editor. As a member of the faculty at IESE Business School, he holds the Schneider Electric Chair of Sustainability and Business Strategy. He is an author and editor of leading academic journals.

== Education and professional career ==
Berrone has degrees in Business Administration from the Catholic University of Córdoba and from International Business and Management at the FUNCER Business School (Siglo XXI University). Berrone earned his PhD in Business Economics and Quantitative Methods from the Carlos III University of Madrid.

He has been a visiting professor at academic institutions in Canada, the United States, Singapore, and the United Kingdom. At IESE Business School, he has been the director of the Strategic Management Department since September 2024, and was the academic director of the Executive MBA from 2018 to 2022.

== Research and publications ==
With over 40 scientific articles, his area of research covers corporate governance, sustainability, business strategy, and family businesses. He has been vice president of the Iberoamerican Academy of Management (2011-2019), and a member of the editorial board of other indexed academic journals. He is co-director of the IESE Cities in Motion research platform alongside Joan Enric Ricart.

Berrone has directed and participated in research projects financed by international organizations. Among them, GrowSmarter (Horizon 2020, European Union), and "Greenwashing and Corporate Sustainability, a study on the credibility of companies' environmental initiatives", financed by the BBVA Foundation.

Among his research topics, he has developed a study on the mass phenomenon surrounding singer Taylor Swift, a phenomenon that has reached unprecedented proportions in the music industry.

== Awards and recognition ==
Throughout his research career, Pascual Berrone has received various academic awards: Best doctoral thesis (2009) awarded by the Academy of Management, the IBM Faculty Award (2015), and the Research Excellence Award from the IESE Alumni Association (2012, 2018 and 2024) among others.

== Publications ==
Among books, book chapters and academic articles, the following are particularly noteworthy:

- Berrone, P.; Duran, P.; Gomez-Mejia, L.; Heugens, P.; Kostova, T. & van Essen, M. “Impact of informal institutions on the prevalence, strategy, and performance of family firms: A meta-analysis” Journal of International Business Studies, 53, 1153–1177 (2022)
- Berrone, P., Fosfuri, A. Gelabert, L.; Gomez-Mejia, L. “Necessity as the mother of « green » inventions: Institutional pressures and environmental innovations” 2013 Strategic Management Journal. 34 (8) 891–909
- Berrone, P. (2016). “Green lies: How Greenwashing can destroy a company (and how to go green without the wash)” CreateSpace. New York. (270 pags).
- Berrone, P., Gelabert, L., Massa, F., and Rousseau, H. “Understanding Community Dynamics in the study of grand challenges: How nonprofits, institutional actors and the community fabric interact to influence income inequality”. 2016 Academy of Management Journal. 59(6). 1940-1964.
