= María Cecilia Rodríguez =

Argentine politician (born 1967)

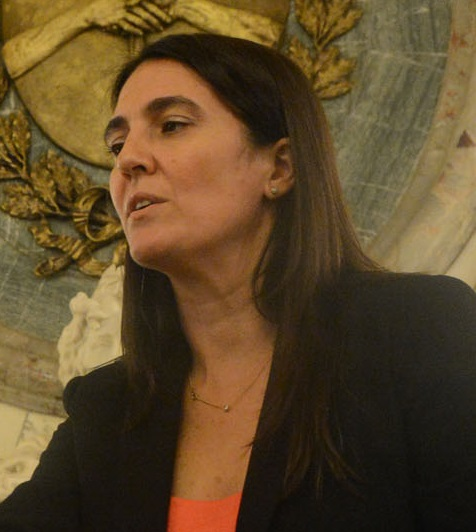
- María Cecilia Rodríguez in 2013

Minister of Security
- In office 4 December 2013 – 10 December 2015
- President: Cristina Fernández de Kirchner
- Preceded by: Arturo Puricelli
- Succeeded by: Patricia Bullrich

Personal details
- Born: September 12, 1967 (age 59) Buenos Aires
- Party: New Encounter
- Education: Universidad del Salvador

María Cecilia Rodríguez (born September 12, 1967) is an Argentine public policy maker. She was Minister of Security of Argentina from 4 December 2013 to 10 December 2015, serving in the cabinet of Cristina Fernández de Kirchner.

== Biography ==
Rodríguez was born in Buenos Aires. She enrolled at the Universidad del Salvador, a Jesuit university in Buenos Aires, in 1985 and graduated with a degree in political science in 1990. She entered public service in 1991 as an electoral history researcher at the National General Archives, later serving as an assistant in the Ministries of Education (1992) and the Interior (1993). She taught history, economic, and sociology at the IAES college preparatory school (1991–92); and social policy at the Argentine National Gendarmerie Officers' School (1994–95) and the Catholic University of Salta from 2000 to 2002.

Rodríguez joined Argentina's White Helmets humanitarian assistance organization as a project planning official in 1994. She contributed in this capacity to White Helmet missions in the Gaza Strip (youth sports); Honduras and Nicaragua (health crisis management in the aftermath of Hurricane Mitch); Bolivia (Chagas disease mitigation); Paraguay (family farming); and Argentina itself (flood relief). Rodríguez served in this post until 1999, and was made a member of the United Nations Disaster Assessment and Coordination (UNDAC) in April of that year. Her later humanitarian projects include sports development for the United Nations Mission in Kosovo (2002), as well as disaster relief planning for the UN Office for the Coordination of Humanitarian Affairs in El Salvador (2001) and Panama (2005).

She returned to the Ministry of Social Development in 2006 as a specialist in emergencies, reaching the position of Technical Coordinator of Direct Social Assistance for the Secretariat of Territories in February 2009; she was promoted in March 2010 to National Director of Critical Care at the same undersecretariat. Rodríguez remained in that position until March 2012, when she was appointed Secretary of Citizen Participation for the Secretariat of Security by the newly appointed Security Secretary Sergio Berni. She was appointed Secretary of Military Emergency Assistance Coordination in May 2013, and in December of that year was nominated by President Cristina Fernández de Kirchner as Minister of Security.

As Security Minister, Rodríguez refocused the nation's drug policy by prioritizing illegal drug trade abatement over suppressing possession as had been the case in Argentina for decades. She stated during her nomination process that "the war on drugs has failed at a global level" and in July 2014 affirmed that the decriminalization of drug use in Argentina should be debated in the near future.
