= Alejandra Monteoliva =

Argentine politician (born 1970)

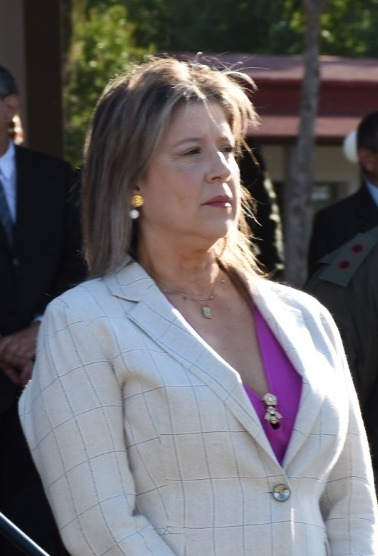
- Alejandra Monteoliva in 2024

Minister of National Security
- Incumbent
- Assumed office 2 December 2025
- President: Javier Milei
- Preceded by: Patricia Bullrich

Personal details
- Born: Alejandra Susana Monteoliva; 30 August 1970 (age 56) Córdoba, Argentina
- Education: Catholic University of Córdoba; University of the Andes

Alejandra Susana Monteoliva (Spanish pronunciation: [aleˈxandɾa suˈsana monte̯oˈliβa]; born 30 August 1970) is an Argentine politician, Minister of National Security of Argentina since 2025 under president Javier Milei. She previously served as Secretary of National Security between 2024 and 2025 and Minister of Security for the Córdoba Province in 2013.

== Early life ==
Monteoliva was born on 30 August 1970 in Córdoba, Argentina. She obtained a degree in political science and international relations from the Catholic University of Cordoba in 1993 and a master's degree in regional development planning and administration from the University of the Andes in Colombia.

She lived in Colombia for 19 years, where she specialised in security policies and collaborated with the Colombian National Police during the leadership of Óscar Naranjo Trujillo and with other Latin American and Caribbean countries through international organisations such as the Inter-American Development Bank and the Andean Development Corporation. In the 1990s, she was kidnapped in the Caribbean region of Colombia by the FARC near the municipality of Fundación.

== Political career ==
Between 2012 and 2013, Monteoliva worked in the administration of José Manuel de la Sota, Governor of the province of Córdoba, as director of the Crime and Violence Observatory and director of Planning and Training at the Ministry of Security. On 16 September 2013 Monteoliva was sworn in as the new provincial Minister of Security, calling in her inaugural speech for a thorough investigation following the arrest of five police officers responsible against drug trafficking.

During the 2013 Argentine police revolts, Córdoba was one of the most affectes provinces and suffered significant waves of looting, which forced her to resign on 9 December of that year also due to the controversial deployment of Argentine National Gendarmerie to calm the situation.

She subsequently rose through the ranks of the federal administration, serving as national director of security operations between 2015 and 2019 during Patricia Bullrich's tenure as Minister of National Security during Mauricio Macri's presidency. Between 2020 and 2024, Monteoliva was senior advisor for security operations at the United Nations for the World Food Programme and the United Nations Development Programme in Central America.

In her second term as Minister of National Security, Patricia Bullrich appointed Alejandra Monteoliva as the new Secretary of Security on 23 June 2024 after the dismissal of Vicente Ventura Barreiro. Monteoliva was working at that time as a security adviser for the governments of El Salvador and Honduras through the Infosegura Regional Office of the United Nations Development Programme.

=== Minister of National Security of Argentina (since 2025) ===
Following Bullrich's election as senator in the 2025 legislative election, on 22 November 2025 President Javier Milei confirmed that Monteoliva would be the new Minister of National Security to ensure "continuity of direction" of "law and order". Bullrich resigned on 1 December 2025 and Monteoliva took office on 2 December 2025.

She met with the family of Nahuel on 10 December 2025, a police officer detained in Venezuela since 2024, stating that "his detention is unacceptable and a direct violation of his freedom. [...] We will not stop until Nahuel returns home".

On 15 December 2025, Monteoliva signed an agreement with the European Union ambassador to strengthen immigration controls, improve cooperation and raise operational standards in the fight against organised crime and terrorism.

Political offices
Preceded by Patricia Bullrich	Minister of National Security; 2025–present	Incumbent
