= Catholic University of Córdoba =

Coordinates: 31°25′09″S 64°11′13″W

Catholic University of Cordoba
- Universidad Católica de Córdoba
- Motto: Veritas Liberabit Vos (Latin)
- Motto in English: The truth will set you free
- Established: 1956; 70 years ago
- Affiliations: Roman Catholic, Jesuit
- Chancellor: S.E.R. Card. Ángel Sixto Rossi, S.J.
- Vice-Chancellor: R.P. Luis Rafael Velasco, S.J.
- Rector: R.P. Andrés I. Aguerre, S.J.
- Location: Cordoba, Argentina
- Website: www.ucc.edu.ar

The Universidad Católica de Córdoba (UCC) is a Jesuit university in Argentina that was founded on June 8, 1956, immediately after private universities were authorized.

== In brief ==
UCC is part of the worldwide network of Jesuit universities in over 90 countries, and a member of Jesuit Universities of Latin America (AUSJAL). Its mutual cooperation includes academic exchange agreements and joint degree programs. It has three campuses with over 10,000 students in its eleven faculties and one institute. All graduate programs are accredited by the National Assessment and Accreditation of Universities (CONEAU). Doctorates are conferred in Medicine, Health Sciences, Politics and Government, Agricultural Sciences, Microelectronics, Theology and Chemical Sciences.

== Social responsibility ==
UCC offers a liberal education with philosophy, anthropology, ethics, and theology woven into various programs. This includes a strong commitment to be "academically engaged and socially responsible." In 2006 UCC formally adopted an approach it calls University Social Responsibility (RSU), with not only civic engagement and community outreach activities but also social responsibility stressed in every aspect of the university, including its administration, teaching, and research. Under the RSU program, UCC requires that each faculty submit a list of social responsibility projects that they will undertake in the coming year, independently or in collaboration with other faculties, thus involving faculty and students from across the university. The university further encourages students, teachers, and young professionals to volunteer for community service through its "Volunteers - Universidad Católica de Córdoba" program, working under the motto "We enter to learn, depart to serve." They apply knowledge in an interdisciplinary way to various social problems, promote social awareness and a sense of solidarity, and acknowledge responsibility for the most vulnerable. The intended outcome is that graduates be not only good professionals but also critical, compassionate, and committed persons in a society increasingly torn by exclusion and injustice.

== Academic units ==
- Faculty of Architecture
- Faculty of Agricultural Sciences – includes Veterinary
- Faculty of Economic and Administrative Sciences
- Faculty of Engineering
- Faculty of Law and Social Sciences
- Faculty of Health Sciences (Medicine, Dentistry, Nursing,
  Nutrition, Surgical Instrumentation, and Occupational Therapy
- Faculty of Education Sciences
- Faculty of Political Sciences and International Relations
- Faculty of Engineering
- Faculty of Philosophy and Humanities
- Faculty of Chemical Sciences
- Faculty of Theology
- Institute of Administrative Sciences

== Campuses ==
- Main Campus (Armada Argentina Avenue 5500): Administrative Headquarters, Faculty of Engineering, Faculty of Architecture, Faculty of Political Sciences, Faculty of Chemical Sciences, Faculty of Law and Social Sciences, Faculty of Agropecuarian Sciences. Main building of Library and Center of Cellular Biology – Sports Campus, Botanic Garden, Veterinary Clinic and Veterinary Hospital – Experimental Campus
- Campus Centro (Trejo 323- downtown): Faculty of Philosophy and Humanities, Faculty of Theology, Faculty of Education Sciences, Institute of Administrative Sciences and Diego de Torres sj Auditorium
- Campus for Health Sciences: Facultad de Medicina – (Jacinto Ríos and Oncativo and Libertad 1550 – Anexo Pedro Arrupe sj), Barrio General Paz – Faculty of Medicine (Medicine, Dentistry, Nursery, Surgical Instrumentation, Nutrition, Occupational Therapy; graduate programs in Health Sciences- and the Hospitals Clinica Universitaria Reina Fabiola and Clinica Odontologica Sixto Castellanos sj)

== Notable alumni ==
- Juan Carlos Maqueda, Argentine lawyer, politician and former justice of the Supreme Court of Argentina; graduated in law from the Catholic University of Córdoba.
- María Belén Mendé Fernández, Argentine political scientist and higher-education executive; B.A. in Political Sciences from the Catholic University of Córdoba and former rector (2014–2023) and later vice president of Fundación Universidad Siglo 21.
- Alejandra Monteoliva, Argentine politician Minister of National Security of Argentina since 2025.

== See also ==
- List of Jesuit sites
