= Pueyrredón family =

Pueyrredón is a French surname. It originated in the 13th century. Initial variants were Puyredón, Puiredón, Puecheredón and Puitredón.

== Etymology ==
The name comes from "Podium Rotundum". "Puy" ("podium" in Latin) means mountain or hill, and "redón" means round. So, Pueyrredón" becomes "rounded hill". It was used at the Languedoc to name "puy" (podium) any lonely mountain. Such structures were strategically useful for as castle sites, many royal family names included "Puy". Neither the family nor their contemporaries wrote the surname with an acute accent on the o, as it is a French surname. The ordinance 6324 of the General Pueyrredón Partido rules that the surname has no stress mark, and that mentions of it should not include it.

== History ==
The family was started by Juan Martín de Pueyrredón, born in 1736 in Issor, France. He moved to Buenos Aires in 1764 and married Rita O'Doghan, daughter of Irish immigrants. They had 8 children, such as Juan Martín de Pueyrredón, who became Supreme Director of the United Provinces of the Río de la Plata. Juana was the most prolific: she married Anselmo Sáenz Valiente and had 14 children, starting the largest branch of the family, with 7284 descendants as of 2000.

== Notables ==
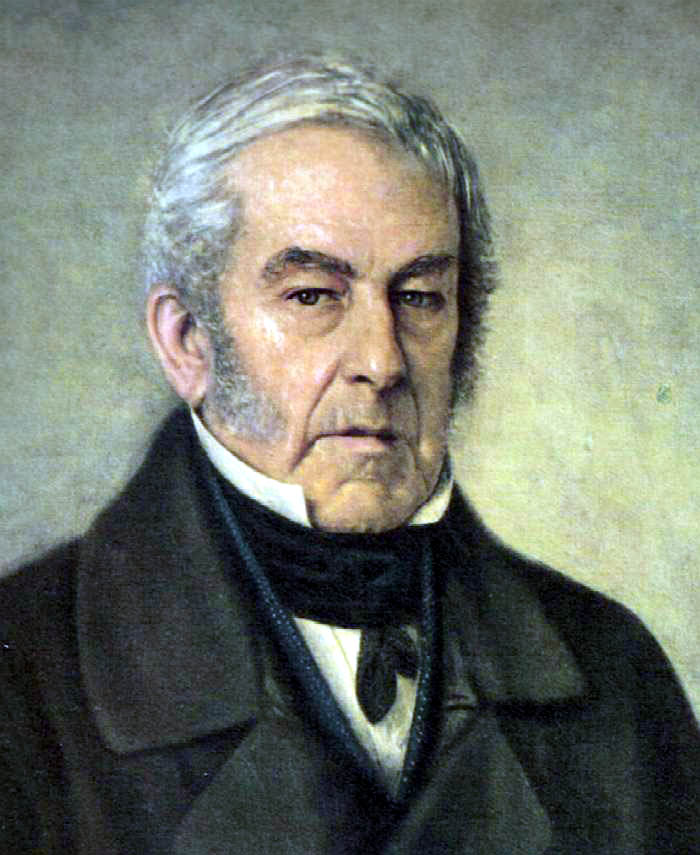
Portrait of Juan Martín de Pueyrredón by Prilidiano Pueyrredon; both are members of the family

- Juan Martín de Pueyrredón (1777-1850), Supreme Director of the United Provinces of the Río de la Plata
- Prilidiano Pueyrredon (1823-1870), painter
- José Hernández (1834-1886)
- Honorio Pueyrredón (1876-1945), minister of Hipólito Yrigoyen
- Horacio Honorio Pueyrredón, national deputee
- Ricardo Pueyrredón, ceremonial chief of Raúl Alfonsín
- Victoria Ocampo, writer
- Silvina Ocampo, writer
- César "Banana" Pueyrredón, singer
- Horacio Rodríguez Larreta (father), president of Racing Club de Avellaneda
- Horacio Rodríguez Larreta (b. 1965), Chief of government of Buenos Aires
- Delfina Frers, model
- Fabiana Cantilo (b. 1959), rock singer
- Patricia Bullrich (b. 1956), minister and presidential candidate
- Juan Navarro, businessman leader of Exxel Group
- Jorge Born, from Bunge&Born
- Juan Born, from Bunge&Born
- Inés de Lafuente Lacroze, businessman
- Victoria Pueyrredon, writer
- Enrique Pinedo, lawyer
- José Cilley, rugbier

== Bibliography ==
- Luna, Félix (1999). Grandes protagonistas de la historia argentina: Juan Martín de Pueyrredón (in Spanish). Buenos Aires: Editorial Planeta. ISBN 950-49-0469-6.
