= Ministry of National Security (Argentina) =

Government ministry of Argentina

Ministry of National Security of the Argentine Republic
- Ministerio de Seguridad Nacional de la República Argentina
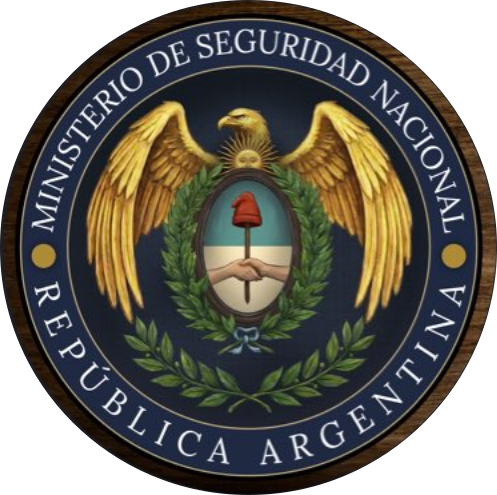

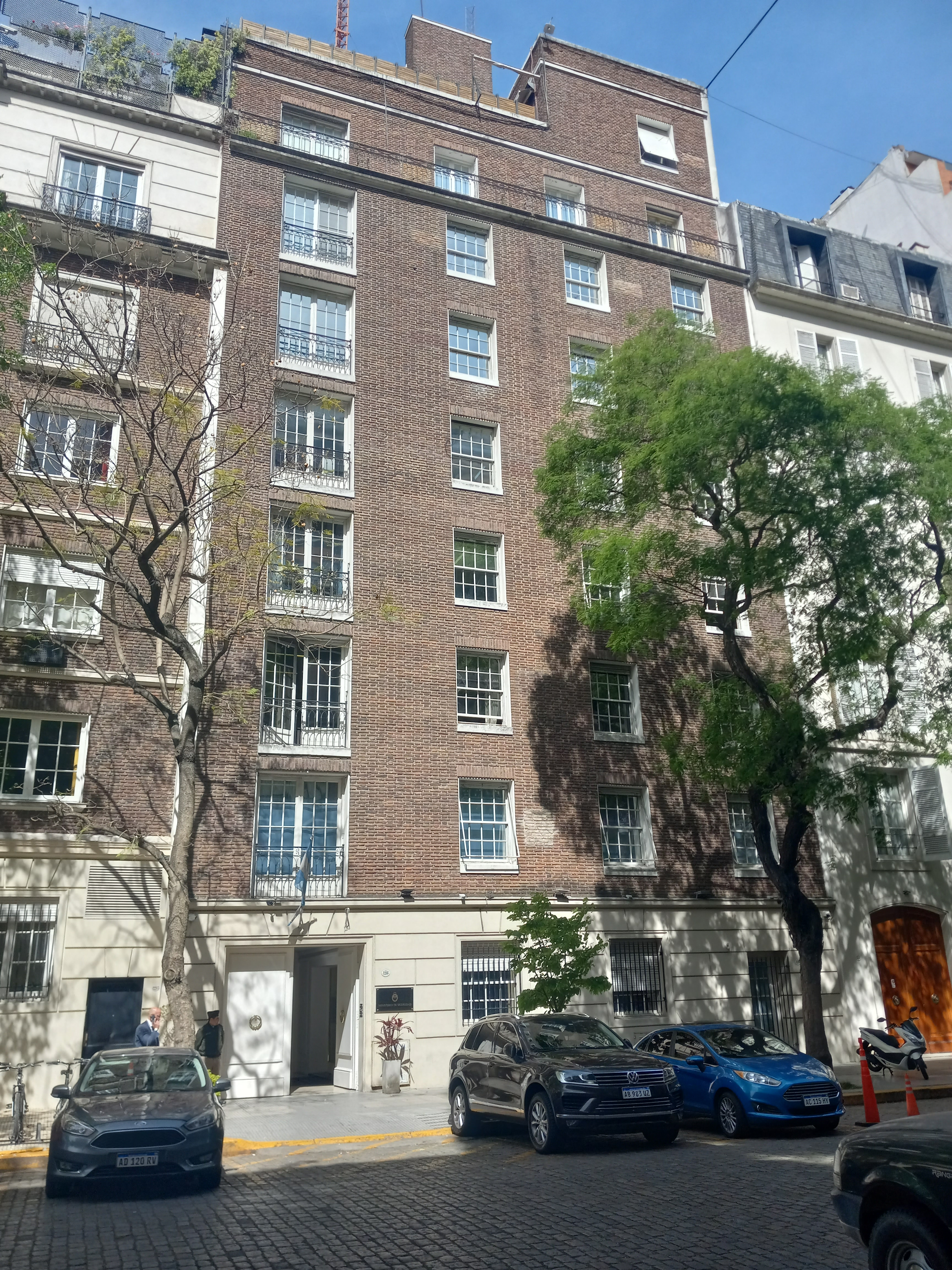
- Headquarters of the ministry in Buenos Aires

Ministry overview
- Formed: 2010; 16 years ago
- Preceding Ministry: Ministry of Justice, Security and Human Rights
- Jurisdiction: Government of Argentina
- Headquarters: Av. Gen. Gelly y Obes 2289, Buenos Aires
- Annual budget: $ 247,654,488,209 (2021)
- Minister responsible: Alejandra Monteoliva
- Child agencies: Airport Security Police; Federal Police; Gendarmerie; Naval Prefecture; Penitentiary Service
- Website: argentina.gob.ar/seguridad

The Ministry of National Security (Spanish: Ministerio de Seguridad Nacional; MINSEG) of Argentina is a ministry of the national executive power that oversees public safety and security. It co-ordinates the country's national security policy and oversees the Federal Police, the Airport Security Police, the Naval Prefecture, the National Gendarmerie, and the Penitentiary Service, as well as the newly created Federal Council for Interior Security.

The Ministry was created in 2010 by decree of then-President Cristina Fernández de Kirchner; matters of national security had previously been part of the Ministry of Justice's portfolio. The current minister of security is Patricia Bullrich, who assumed office in 2023 under President Javier Milei.

== Responsibilities ==
The responsibilities and attributions of the Ministry of Security are outlined in article 22 bis of the Ley de Ministerios, which states that it is the ministry's goal to assist the President of the Nation and the Chief of the Cabinet of Ministers in all matters pertaining to national security, the preservation of liberties, life and the patrimony of Argentina's inhabitants, as well as their rights, within the Argentine Republic's democratic framework.

== List of ministers ==
No.	Minister	Party	Term	President
1	Nilda Garré	Broad Front	15 December 2010 – 3 June 2013	Cristina Fernández de Kirchner
2	Arturo Puricelli	Justicialist Party	3 June 2013 – 2 December 2013	Cristina Fernández de Kirchner
3	María Cecilia Rodríguez	New Encounter	2 December 2013 – 10 December 2015	Cristina Fernández de Kirchner
4	Patricia Bullrich	Republican Proposal	10 December 2015 – 10 December 2019	Mauricio Macri
5	Sabina Frederic	Independent	10 December 2019 – 20 September 2021	Alberto Fernández
6	Aníbal Fernández	Justicialist Party	20 September 2021 – 10 December 2023	Alberto Fernández
7	Patricia Bullrich	Republican Proposal	10 December 2023 – present	Javier Milei

== See also ==
- Law enforcement in Argentina
- Argentine Federal Police
- Interior Security System
