= Cities in Motion Index =

Index to evaluate development of Cities worldwide

The IESE Cities in Motion Index is a study published annually by the business school of the University of Navarra (IESE) that aims to evaluate the development of the world's cities. It assesses several socioeconomic aspects of development, including human capital, social cohesion (which includes employment, female participation in the work force, etc.), governance, sustainable development, mobility and transportation, urban planning, international outreach, and technology. The most recent version, published in 2019, examines 174 cities across 80 countries.

The IESE Cities in Motion is co-directed by professors Pascual Berrone and Joan Enric Ricart.

== 2019 ranking ==
The list according to the 2019 ranking.

Rank	City	Country	CIMI	Economy	Human capital	Social cohesion	Environment	Governance	Urban planning	International outreach	Technology	Mobility and transportation
1	London	United Kingdom	100,00	12	1	45	34	7	9	1	8	3
2	New York City	United States	94,63	1	3	137	78	26	2	8	11	5
3	Amsterdam	Netherlands	86,70	10	36	38	28	27	11	2	7	11
4	Paris	France	86,23	8	6	86	54	37	50	3	15	4
5	Reykjavík	Iceland	85,35	90	53	18	1	19	108	22	4	46
6	Tokyo	Japan	84,11	3	9	49	6	71	24	35	20	29
7	Singapore	Singapore	82,73	21	44	47	10	20	31	4	1	67
8	Copenhagen	Denmark	81,80	25	28	11	3	12	75	16	10	25
9	Berlin	Germany	80,88	50	5	39	47	6	40	5	32	6
10	Vienna	Austria	78,85	57	23	31	15	25	45	7	13	7
Rank	City	Country	CIMI	Economy	Human capital	Social cohesion	Environment	Governance	Urban planning	International outreach	Technology	Mobility and transportation
11	Hong Kong	Hong Kong	78,76	29	17	140	20	21	8	15	2	40
12	Seoul	South Korea	78,13	15	14	95	32	39	27	34	6	17
13	Stockholm	Sweden	77,89	18	58	60	5	24	48	24	14	21
14	Oslo	Norway	77,45	17	71	20	8	52	54	19	17	20
15	Zürich	Switzerland	76,66	22	35	1	25	9	68	21	25	55
16	Los Angeles	United States	76,04	2	2	82	152	5	14	33	21	134
17	Chicago	United States	75,55	7	10	104	130	41	5	18	35	38
18	Toronto	Canada	75,30	40	30	76	53	17	1	27	16	58
19	Sydney	Australia	75,26	28	29	22	18	22	23	10	26	109
20	Melbourne	Australia	75,08	34	33	23	31	4	15	6	40	111
Rank	City	Country	CIMI	Economy	Human capital	Social cohesion	Environment	Governance	Urban planning	International outreach	Technology	Mobility and transportation
21	San Francisco	United States	75,07	4	11	79	122	64	13	36	3	100
22	Helsinki	Finland	74,08	32	55	10	12	8	64	39	66	47
23	Washington, D.C.	United States	73,14	5	8	71	141	13	10	40	31	92
24	Madrid	Spain	73,02	39	41	55	58	46	33	17	34	9
25	Boston	United States	72,91	9	4	84	115	15	21	69	19	131
26	Wellington	New Zealand	72,82	31	68	6	2	14	41	79	79	70
27	Munich	Germany	72,71	36	63	16	69	32	58	28	38	8
28	Barcelona	Spain	72,25	51	46	89	51	29	29	11	24	12
29	Basel	Switzerland	70,39	35	54	4	36	11	136	49	57	19
30	Taipei	Taiwan	70,04	83	20	3	145	3	12	55	23	10
Rank	City	Country	CIMI	Economy	Human capital	Social cohesion	Environment	Governance	Urban planning	International outreach	Technology	Mobility and transportation
31	Bern	Switzerland	70,03	75	67	2	70	1	104	112	71	22
32	Geneva	Switzerland	69,78	37	85	30	60	2	139	13	48	41
33	Frankfurt	Germany	69,39	41	45	44	80	59	25	32	73	18
34	Hamburg	Germany	69,23	45	32	74	57	28	55	46	59	14
35	Auckland	New Zealand	69,10	30	95	25	7	38	53	51	37	106
36	Gothenburg	Sweden	68,65	33	75	68	11	36	36	83	55	33
37	Dublin	Ireland	68,19	26	105	42	24	67	92	30	28	69
38	Montreal	Canada	66,82	53	50	43	63	40	7	41	43	84
39	Ottawa	Canada	66,68	55	43	13	62	16	6	98	75	79
40	Miami	United States	66,31	20	18	102	142	47	36	9	62	94
Rank	City	Country	CIMI	Economy	Human capital	Social cohesion	Environment	Governance	Urban planning	International outreach	Technology	Mobility and transportation
41	Milan	Italy	65,94	42	34	81	66	109	56	31	96	23
42	Phoenix	United States	65,73	19	13	72	137	56	59	43	56	66
43	Rotterdam	Netherlands	65,38	69	62	35	49	101	16	92	47	16
44	Lisbon	Portugal	65,32	71	77	70	14	73	76	26	49	76
45	Dallas	United States	65,13	6	12	80	134	63	71	85	29	120
46	Edinburgh	United Kingdom	65,03	61	24	12	81	75	109	38	54	39
47	Prague	Czech Republic	64,97	96	57	29	26	82	81	20	46	57
48	Brussels	Belgium	64,79	65	112	66	43	44	49	45	33	24
49	San Diego	United States	64,43	23	21	62	138	10	61	52	45	122
50	Düsseldorf	Germany	64,34	47	88	24	33	89	126	47	88	26
Rank	City	Country	CIMI	Economy	Human capital	Social cohesion	Environment	Governance	Urban planning	International outreach	Technology	Mobility and transportation
51	Cologne	Germany	64,19	43	61	26	92	31	130	63	70	27
52	Denver	United States	64,01	16	31	78	158	45	18	44	12	96
53	Stuttgart	Germany	64,01	38	70	15	65	79	96	89	69	30
54	Philadelphia	United States	63,27	14	16	96	144	51	43	88	22	110
55	Vancouver	Canada	63,15	104	83	33	77	68	3	58	44	71
56	Lyon	France	62,56	62	52	41	64	66	72	75	64	51
57	Eindhoven	Netherlands	62,35	56	82	9	107	58	69	99	9	48
58	Seattle	United States	61,96	11	51	77	143	23	78	67	30	149
59	Shanghai	China	61,78	80	27	129	147	74	37	59	116	1
60	Houston	United States	61,74	13	40	119	150	60	17	56	39	129
Rank	City	Country	CIMI	Economy	Human capital	Social cohesion	Environment	Governance	Urban planning	International outreach	Technology	Mobility and transportation
61	Valencia	Spain	61,52	70	109	46	39	33	51	107	111	31
62	San Antonio	United States	61,33	27	37	63	135	57	44	103	51	99
63	Birmingham	United Kingdom	61,30	59	38	34	72	55	70	80	85	75
64	Glasgow	United Kingdom	61,23	68	25	17	95	49	80	60	84	95
65	Tallinn	Estonia	60,96	79	47	37	21	125	62	95	53	90
66	Santiago	Chile	60,96	63	93	111	30	87	28	57	100	56
67	Quebec City	Canada	60,64	54	84	7	79	18	97	114	52	93
68	Osaka	Japan	60,50	44	72	85	23	104	91	113	80	60
69	Warsaw	Poland	60,13	78	79	69	96	77	20	53	124	45
70	Bratislava	Slovakia	59,92	91	49	14	35	50	67	122	113	85
Rank	City	Country	CIMI	Economy	Human capital	Social cohesion	Environment	Governance	Urban planning	International outreach	Technology	Mobility and transportation
71	Baltimore	United States	59,86	24	56	103	129	42	47	91	60	115
72	Antwerp	Belgium	59,84	86	108	40	48	96	42	129	63	32
73	Budapest	Hungary	59,65	105	42	108	38	85	83	37	67	61
74	Vilnius	Lithuania	59,15	94	22	128	22	53	57	108	109	78
75	Rome	Italy	59,09	48	48	120	123	62	141	14	106	62
76	Seville	Spain	58,57	76	96	50	67	86	60	97	107	37
77	Buenos Aires	Argentina	58,42	132	66	113	29	30	19	29	110	133
78	Manchester	United Kingdom	58,05	115	19	53	101	76	101	74	77	52
79	Leeds	United Kingdom	58,98	77	26	27	84	72	119	128	99	74
80	Málaga	Spain	57,59	74	101	54	86	100	107	62	117	34
Rank	City	Country	CIMI	Economy	Human capital	Social cohesion	Environment	Governance	Urban planning	International outreach	Technology	Mobility and transportation
81	Tel Aviv	Israel	57,47	60	126	57	41	54	34	104	42	126
82	Nagoya	Japan	57,26	66	91	52	16	98	132	131	103	89
83	Beijing	China	56,81	58	64	127	163	116	63	50	115	2
84	Riga	Latvia	56,27	146	74	101	27	97	26	93	61	73
85	Nice	France	56,09	87	73	73	83	93	116	42	82	105
86	Moscow	Russia	55,91	100	7	163	136	43	22	73	92	65
87	Linz	Austria	55,89	117	80	5	37	90	143	153	112	35
88	Palma de Mallorca	Spain	55,57	120	115	64	88	110	98	12	94	64
89	Marseille	France	55,10	84	94	83	106	80	77	87	86	68
90	Duisburg	Germany	54,93	126	92	21	105	102	135	66	108	28
Rank	City	Country	CIMI	Economy	Human capital	Social cohesion	Environment	Governance	Urban planning	International outreach	Technology	Mobility and transportation
91	Porto	Portugal	54,76	85	125	56	19	92	138	86	89	103
92	Montevideo	Uruguay	54,75	106	131	106	4	69	84	110	65	118
93	Ljubljana	Slovenia	54,41	136	100	32	45	91	93	134	36	72
94	Liverpool	United Kingdom	53,52	110	65	19	109	78	103	127	93	101
95	Wrocław	Poland	53,39	92	89	92	98	112	46	135	128	49
96	Nottingham	United Kingdom	53,36	81	69	28	117	81	124	147	90	104
97	Zagreb	Croatia	53,30	135	110	61	46	35	86	130	78	98
98	Lille	France	52,93	88	97	59	99	117	111	137	95	53
99	Dubai	United Arab Emirates	52,92	64	145	36	159	70	90	25	5	117
100	Kuala Lumpur	Malaysia	52,83	49	116	109	113	126	94	64	130	59
Rank	City	Country	CIMI	Economy	Human capital	Social cohesion	Environment	Governance	Urban planning	International outreach	Technology	Mobility and transportation
101	Zaragoza	Spain	52,53	122	81	75	93	83	102	149	98	42
102	A Coruña	Spain	51,85	128	98	67	59	135	73	150	101	44
103	Bucharest	Romania	51,49	72	102	97	104	122	88	78	81	127
104	Bangkok	Thailand	51,35	46	133	123	125	150	30	23	127	140
105	Murcia	Spain	51,19	125	111	48	97	108	65	163	74	50
106	Athens	Greece	50,71	114	78	155	52	143	133	61	27	80
107	Bilbao	Spain	50,14	118	117	88	91	107	89	125	87	63
108	Florence	Italy	49,54	121	59	90	128	127	147	68	121	54
109	Turin	Italy	49,51	111	87	98	133	105	131	101	131	36
110	Minsk	Belarus	49,23	113	90	105	61	132	113	146	118	77
Rank	City	Country	CIMI	Economy	Human capital	Social cohesion	Environment	Governance	Urban planning	International outreach	Technology	Mobility and transportation
111	Kyiv	Ukraine	49,11	107	103	158	120	114	4	123	119	108
112	San José	Costa Rica	49,01	97	158	112	13	61	146	100	105	138
113	Guangzhou	China	48,40	82	128	117	154	145	105	90	132	13
114	Panama City	Panama	47,51	119	146	110	42	147	99	81	50	125
115	Sofia	Bulgaria	46,71	164	76	87	90	88	149	115	97	82
116	Naples	Italy	46,62	127	99	99	112	141	115	111	136	81
117	Bogotá	Colombia	46,01	124	106	159	89	34	112	76	125	148
118	Istanbul	Turkey	45,85	67	124	165	132	151	66	48	76	112
119	Shenzhen	China	45,28	73	137	136	153	158	100	126	133	15
120	Belgrade	Serbia	44,86	161	107	132	56	128	121	96	68	121
Rank	City	Country	CIMI	Economy	Human capital	Social cohesion	Environment	Governance	Urban planning	International outreach	Technology	Mobility and transportation
121	Saint Petersburg	Russia	44,12	145	39	153	155	99	52	77	120	135
122	Ho Chi Minh City	Vietnam	43,49	98	154	124	73	156	114	94	153	83
123	Jerusalem	Israel	43,27	150	136	150	55	48	148	65	134	139
124	Tbilisi	Georgia	42,96	102	139	122	100	129	140	132	72	141
125	Rosario	Argentina	42,45	171	118	51	87	103	32	138	144	142
126	Doha	Qatar	42,14	52	168	58	166	149	129	84	18	128
127	Abu Dhabi	United Arab Emirates	42,12	116	157	8	169	84	118	54	83	97
128	Rio de Janeiro	Brazil	42,08	149	114	168	110	95	38	72	129	154
129	Almaty	Kazakhstan	42,04	123	127	138	108	153	74	167	140	87
130	Brasília	Brazil	41,84	144	151	151	85	106	106	118	139	88
Rank	City	Country	CIMI	Economy	Human capital	Social cohesion	Environment	Governance	Urban planning	International outreach	Technology	Mobility and transportation
131	Baku	Azerbaijan	41,24	137	123	100	75	164	137	143	122	119
132	São Paulo	Brazil	40,90	138	129	167	102	123	39	70	123	168
133	Mexico City	Mexico	40,79	131	60	141	168	111	35	71	135	116
134	Medellín	Colombia	40,67	140	132	143	114	113	87	155	143	107
135	Ankara	Turkey	39,61	162	113	115	139	131	95	142	138	86
136	Córdoba	Argentina	38,38	170	120	93	74	119	123	148	151	146
137	Quito	Ecuador	38,19	139	130	130	82	169	122	116	157	143
138	Lima	Peru	38,14	101	122	139	140	115	142	136	147	152
139	Santo Domingo	Dominican Republic	37,43	134	166	149	44	137	120	133	159	158
140	Curitiba	Brazil	37,33	153	149	145	71	138	128	152	145	124
Rank	City	Country	CIMI	Economy	Human capital	Social cohesion	Environment	Governance	Urban planning	International outreach	Technology	Mobility and transportation
141	Asunción	Paraguay	37,25	168	119	94	9	160	159	162	165	137
142	Jakarta	Indonesia	35,96	160	15	152	127	139	151	102	142	174
143	Kuwait City	Kuwait	35,61	163	161	91	146	124	161	117	41	123
144	Sarajevo	Bosnia-Herzegovina	35,39	173	86	160	124	133	85	158	146	102
145	La Paz	Bolivia	35,12	152	155	131	68	142	144	120	169	156
146	Salvador	Brazil	34,20	157	135	162	103	148	110	139	161	144
147	Santa Cruz	Bolivia	34,16	148	147	135	17	167	167	140	168	157
148	Cali	Colombia	34,04	143	140	114	118	146	155	170	155	151
149	Skopje	North Macedonia	33,88	169	150	142	119	121	162	154	102	113
150	Amman	Jordan	33,61	154	173	126	121	118	153	141	114	169
Rank	City	Country	CIMI	Economy	Human capital	Social cohesion	Environment	Governance	Urban planning	International outreach	Technology	Mobility and transportation
151	Belo Horizonte	Brazil	33,40	156	141	154	116	154	127	160	148	159
152	Guayaquil	Ecuador	33,10	142	153	107	111	173	152	156	162	150
153	Bangalore	India	32,65	93	134	116	165	140	156	106	154	166
154	Tianjin	China	32,62	89	138	125	172	161	134	161	137	43
155	Casablanca	Morocco	32,31	99	165	134	156	170	154	151	58	160
156	Novosibirsk	Russia	32,05	147	121	147	157	120	117	165	149	163
157	Tunis	Tunisia	31,36	166	152	118	76	136	158	168	163	145
158	Cape Town	South Africa	30,68	165	142	169	131	94	145	109	152	161
159	Manama	Bahrain	30,06	129	156	65	167	166	172	119	91	91
160	Guatemala City	Guatemala	30,06	141	164	144	126	134	163	144	166	165
Rank	City	Country	CIMI	Economy	Human capital	Social cohesion	Environment	Governance	Urban planning	International outreach	Technology	Mobility and transportation
161	Mumbai	India	28,36	103	162	148	164	155	157	121	150	164
162	Nairobi	Kenya	27,99	130	170	166	40	152	169	145	171	173
163	Manila	Philippines	27,73	133	148	161	149	162	160	105	158	170
164	Riyadh	Saudi Arabia	27,71	108	169	121	173	65	165	157	104	136
165	Cairo	Egypt	26,74	109	144	170	160	172	125	159	141	167
166	New Delhi	India	26,52	95	159	157	170	144	168	82	160	114
167	Johannesburg	South Africa	25,95	158	143	171	151	130	150	164	156	155
168	Rabat	Morocco	24,78	167	174	133	148	163	166	169	126	132
169	Kolkata	India	19,54	155	160	156	161	157	164	171	170	172
170	Douala	Cameroon	17,03	172	163	146	50	171	173	172	174	162
Rank	City	Country	CIMI	Economy	Human capital	Social cohesion	Environment	Governance	Urban planning	International outreach	Technology	Mobility and transportation
171	Lagos	Nigeria	10,24	159	167	164	162	165	170	173	173	171
172	Caracas	Venezuela	6,71	174	104	174	94	159	79	124	164	130
173	Lahore	Pakistan	6,27	151	172	173	171	168	174	166	172	147
174	Karachi	Pakistan	4,57	112	171	172	174	174	171	174	167	153
Rank	City	Country	CIMI	Economy	Human capital	Social cohesion	Environment	Governance	Urban planning	International outreach	Technology	Mobility and transportation
