= Juan Manuel Abal Medina =

Argentine journalist and politician (1945–2025)

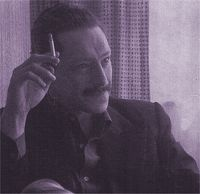
- Abal Medina in 1983
- Born: March 1, 1945; Buenos Aires, Argentina
- Died: June 15, 2025 (aged 80)
- Occupation: Lawyer
- Spouses: Cristina Moldes (m. 1966; div. 1973) Nilda Garré (m. 1973; div. 1982)
- Relatives: Juan Manuel Abal Medina Jr. (son)

Juan Manuel Abal Medina (March 1, 1945 – June 15, 2025) was an Argentine journalist and politician who served as Secretary General of the Peronist Movement between 1972 and 1974. He later became a prominent lawyer in Mexico.

== Early life and entry into politics ==
Abal Medina was born to a wealthy family of a conservative Catholic orientation. He enrolled at the Colegio Nacional de Buenos Aires and became a supporter of Julio Meinvielle's Nationalist Restoration Guard. Abal Medina joined the editorial board of Azul y Blanco, a weekly news magazine in Buenos Aires, in 1966. Directed by Marcelo Sánchez Sorondo and Ricardo Curutchet, both scions of traditional Argentine upper-class families, the nationalist publication supported the Argentine military, which had taken power in a 1966 coup. Azul y Blanco opposed the government of General Juan Carlos Onganía, however, which its editors believed to be subordinating national interests to those of foreign investors. Abal Medina married the former Cristina Moldes in 1966, and they had five children.

His younger brother, Fernando, worked in the periodical's circulation office, and in 1968, co-founded the Montoneros guerrilla organization, becoming its first leader. Fernando Abal Medina participated in the May 1970 abduction and subsequent murder of a former dictator, General Pedro Aramburu, and on September 4, was killed in a police raid in the Buenos Aires suburb of William Morris.

== Perón and Peronism ==
Abal Medina was introduced to Perón in 1971. He had not been a Peronist; indeed, Meinvielle's GRN, to which he had belonged as a youth, was among the most anti-Peronist political groups in Argentina. He soon developed a good rapport with the leader of the Steelworkers' Union, Lorenzo Miguel, and the latter's close ally, CGT Secretary General José Ignacio Rucci, however. Perón had been in exile since the 1955 coup, and was represented in Argentina by a series of appointed delegates. Daniel Paladino, Perón's delegate since 1969, fell out of favor with much of the party machinery (as well as with their chief base of support, the CGT labor union) over differences in strategy as well as over his relatively conciliatory stance toward the dictatorship, and was dismissed by the national committee in November 1971. His successor, Héctor Cámpora, was supported by the left-leaning Peronist Youth, and assumed the post during a period of increasingly bold overtures toward the banned Peronist Movement by the dictator, General Alejandro Lanusse. Pursuant to an August 1971 announcement that preparations of elections would begin, and despite his original intent that Peronists be excluded, he allowed the courts to legalize Peronism on January 26, 1972.

Backed by labor, and in good terms with the military, Abal Medina was named Secretary of Operativo Retorno ("Operation Return") by Cámpora. Perón was 76, and rumors that he was suffering from both ill health and early signs of senility conspired with the myriad conditions imposed by President Lanusse on Peronists to make the exiled leader's return increasingly unlikely. The decision to field Cámpora as a stand-in candidate in elections announced for March 1973 resulted in Abal Medina's election as Secretary General of the Justicialist Party on June 25, 1972, and he became Perón's official delegate in September. Abal Medina's ties to the military and the right notwithstanding, Perón calculated that naming a brother of the late Fernando Abal Medina would do much to placate the restive Montoneros. A series of secret negotiations with military officers and Lanusse's Interior Minister, Arturo Mor Roig, ultimately led to Lanusse's permission for Perón's return, which took place on November 17.

Abal Medina led the selection process for the over 3,500 FREJULI candidates for Congressional, provincial, and local offices in these, the first elections in Argentina of any kind since 1965. He was, moreover, instrumental in persuading Rucci to drop his opposition to a number of key nominations, among them to the candidate for Governor of Buenos Aires, Oscar Bidegain, and to Cámpora, himself. Camporá was elected president in a landslide on March 11, and among the Peronist Youth, whose preferred candidates Abal Medina had retained on the ballot over Rucci's heated objections, the skilled young negotiator was now seen as a future leader.

He made the first serious mistake, however, when the candidate he chose for a Senate seat for Buenos Aires (his friend and former newspaper colleague, Marcelo Sánchez Sorondo), was defeated in an upset by the neophyte UCR candidate, Fernando de la Rúa. His choices for other offices also became complications for Abal Medina. Eight of the candidates he chose for the Lower House to represent Buenos Aires were, in fact, elected. One of these, Nilda Garré Coppello, began an extramarital affair with Abal Medina, resulting in the termination of both their marriages in 1973; Garré and Abal Medina married that year, and they had three children.

Garré, Santiago Díaz Ortiz, and the six others soon became known in Congress as the "Gang of Eight" for their increasingly vocal opposition to Perón's nomination of his right-wing wife, Isabel, as his running mate in snap elections called for September. Abal Medina's support of the Perón–Perón ticket, in turn, distanced him from the Montoneros, one of whose leaders, José Pablo Ventura, issued a public threat against him, shouting at a rally: "Abal Medina: your blood is a bargain in Argentina!"

The alliance of Montoneros with Perón had effectively ended when, in September 1973, Rucci was assassinated. The murder of numerous other public figures followed, and on March 23, 1974, Abal Medina suffered an attempt on his own life. He was convinced, however, that the attack had been carried out by a new threat sponsored from within the Perón government: the Argentine Anticommunist Alliance (Triple A). The Triple A was secretly commanded by Perón's astrologer and closest adviser, José López Rega, who had been given the Social Welfare portfolio (and thus controlled 30 percent of the federal budget). Abal Medina's car was bombed shortly afterward in a second (unsuccessful) attack, and in May, he was removed as Secretary General of the party.

== Exile and new associations ==
Perón died in July and was succeeded by his wife, whose government presided over spiraling violence and inflation. She was overthrown in a coup on March 24, 1976. Most lawmakers and other political figures had advance knowledge of the coup, and Peronists (nearly all of whom were to be arrested) took added precautions, with some opting to leave the country. Abal Medina sought refuge in the Mexican Embassy, and he remained there for years. He shared the refuge with Cámpora, who in 1980 was allowed to leave to Mexico, where he died shortly afterward.

Abal Medina also sought exile in Mexico upon obtaining a safe conduct in 1982. Divorced from his second wife, he had a minor post at the Traffic and Transportation Secretariat and served as an agent of CISEN (Mexican State Intelligence) during the 1988–94 tenure of Interior Secretary Fernando Gutiérrez Barrios. He became close to the PRI (the ruling party in Mexico until 2000), maintained a close friendship with the leader of the rival PRD, Cuauhtémoc Cárdenas, and frequently visited Cuban leader Fidel Castro.

He established a successful law practice in Mexico, and later opened offices in Spain and Argentina. The CEO of Telmex, Carlos Slim, hired Abal Medina as an adviser for his growing interests in Argentina, and in 2007, he was invited by outgoing Argentine President Néstor Kirchner to join the cabinet of his wife and successor, President Cristina Fernández de Kirchner. He cited worsening respiratory problems and refused, however.

Abal Medina regularly visited Argentina. His eldest son, Juan Manuel, served both Kirchner administrations in a number of significant political and policy posts.

Abal Medina died on June 15, 2025, after suffering with chronic obstructive pulmonary disease (COPD). He was 80.
