= Patricia Bullrich =

Argentine politician (born 1956)

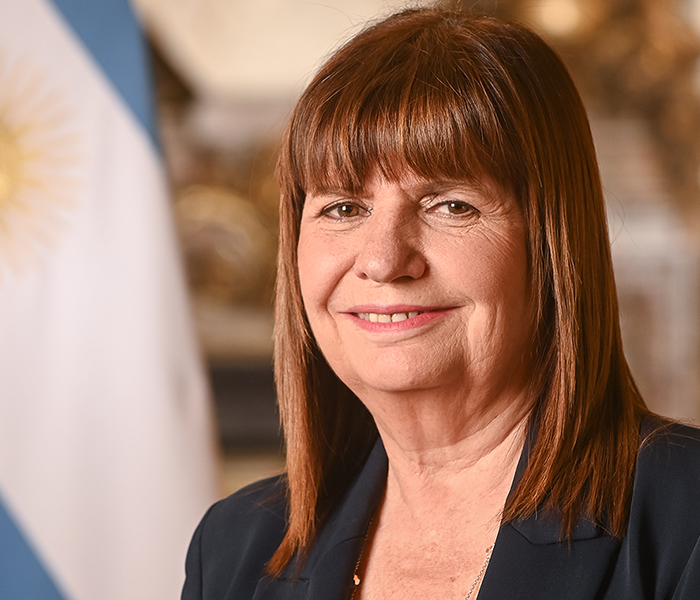
- Official portrait, 2024.

National Senator
- Incumbent
- Assumed office 10 December 2025
- Constituency: City of Buenos Aires

Minister of National Security
- In office 10 December 2023 – 10 December 2025
- President: Javier Milei
- Preceded by: Aníbal Fernández
- Succeeded by: Alejandra Monteoliva
- In office 10 December 2015 – 10 December 2019
- President: Mauricio Macri
- Preceded by: María Cecilia Rodríguez
- Succeeded by: Sabina Frederic

National Deputy
- In office 10 December 2007 – 10 December 2015
- Constituency: City of Buenos Aires
- In office 10 December 1993 – 10 December 1997
- Constituency: City of Buenos Aires

Minister of Social Security
- In office 31 October 2001 – 13 November 2001
- President: Fernando de la Rúa
- Preceded by: Jorge Antonio San Martino; (Secretary of State)
- Succeeded by: José Gabriel Dumón

Minister of Labour, Employment, and Human Resources
- In office 6 October 2000 – 29 October 2001
- President: Fernando de la Rúa
- Preceded by: Alberto Flamarique
- Succeeded by: José Gabriel Dumón

Secretary of Criminal Policy and Penitentiary Affairs
- In office 15 December 1999 – 5 October 2000
- President: Fernando de la Rúa
- Preceded by: Julio Enrique Aparicio
- Succeeded by: Mariano Ciafardini

Personal details
- Born: 11 June 1956 (age 70) Buenos Aires, Argentina
- Party: LLA (since 2025)
- Other political affiliations: PJ (1972–1996); New Leadership (1996–1997); Union for Freedom (1997–2018); PRO (2018–2025)
- Spouses: Marcelo Langieri (m. 1975; div. 1982) Guillermo Yanco (m. 1997)
- Children: 1
- Relatives: Esteban Bullrich (second cousin)
- Education: University of Palermo (BA); FLACSO (MA); National University of General San Martín (PhD)

Patricia Bullrich (Latin American Spanish: [paˈtɾisja ˈβulritʃ]; born 11 June 1956) is a conservative Argentine politician. She currently serves as a National Senator for the Autonomous City of Buenos Aires since December 2025, representing La Libertad Avanza. She previously served as the Minister of National Security from 2023 to 2025 under President Javier Milei, and from 2015 to 2019 under President Mauricio Macri. She was the chairwoman of the Republican Proposal until 2025.

She was born in Buenos Aires, part of the Pueyrredón family. Bullrich graduated from the University of Palermo, and as a young woman she was involved with the Peronist Youth. She married Marcelo Langieri, secretary of Rodolfo Galimberti; Galimberti was a leader of the Montoneros guerrilla and her brother-in-law. They went into exile in 1977, during the Dirty War, and she returned in 1982, after the Falklands War. She was elected deputy for the Justicialist Party in 1993. She left the party and started her own, but could not secure a re-election. She joined the cabinet of president Fernando De la Rúa in 2001.

Following the election of Mauricio Macri to the presidency in the 2015 Argentine general election, she became the Minister of Security. She placed regulations against roadblocks from piqueteros, and opposed the secessionist organization Resistencia Ancestral Mapuche. Leading the "hawk" sector of the Juntos por el Cambio coalition, she was appointed its president in 2020. She ran for the 2023 Argentine primary and general elections. She won the primaries against Horacio Rodríguez Larreta, but ended third in the general elections behind Sergio Massa and Javier Milei. She supported Milei on the ballotage with Massa. After Milei was elected President, he chose Bullrich to serve again as Minister of Security.

On November 30, 2025, Bullrich resigned from her post as Minister of National Security after she was sworn in as a Senator in the Argentine Senate.

== Early life ==
Bullrich was born on 11 June 1956 in Buenos Aires, daughter of Alejandro Bullrich, a cardiologist, and Julieta Luro Pueyrredon. She belongs to two wealthy families on each of her parents' sides. On her mother's side, she belongs to the Pueyrredón family, a traditional lineage of Spanish, French, and Irish descent whose members featured prominently in the early years of Argentine Independence (such as Juan Martín de Pueyrredón and Honorio Pueyrredon). On her father's side, she descends from Adolfo Bullrich, a businessman and politician of German ancestry, who served as Mayor of Buenos Aires from 1898 to 1902. Although it was a wealthy family, Alejandro and Julieta divorced, and Patricia adjusted to a simpler lifestyle when her mother got a job as publicist.

She became politically engaged from an early age, abandoning a potential career in field hockey to dedicate herself fully to political activism. She also worked at the Cheburger fast food joint and became a member of the food workers' union, encouraging coworkers to unionise as well.

She is the cousin of the singer-songwriter Fabiana Cantilo, and introduced her to Argentine rock. In the TV program "Almorzando con Mirtha Legrand" Cantilo explained that their mothers were close as siblings, and that Bullrich invited her to a concert of the band Pescado Rabioso, led by Luis Alberto Spinetta. This was the first concert that Fabiana Cantilo had attended, years before becoming a rock singer herself. Patricia skipped school classes one day to attend the music competition TV program "Si lo sabe cante", where she sang the song "El extraño de pelo largo" of La Joven Guardia. She was defeated in the competition.

=== Peronist Youth years ===
Patricia's grandmother, daughter of Honorio Pueyrredon, took her to meet Ricardo Balbín, leader of the Radical Civic Union (UCR). The meeting had the opposite effect than expected, as there was a huge generation gap between them. Rather than make her embrace the ideas of the UCR, supportive of liberal democracy, she rejected Balbín and chose Peronism instead, which proposed far-left politics at the time. She joined the Peronist Youth (JP), the youth wing of the Peronist movement, aged 17. On 20 June 1973, she joined the procession to Ezeiza to bear witness to Juan Perón's return to Argentina following his 18-year exile, but left before the Ezeiza Massacre took place that same day.

She was also present at the Plaza de Mayo on the International Workers' Day of 1974, when Perón, who had once again become president of Argentina, expelled the Montoneros and the left-wing youth groups from the celebrations. Although both the Peronist unions and guerrillas such as Montoneros had worked together against the Argentine Revolution dictatorship, they had begun a dispute over their political clout on the new democratic government; with the aforementioned expulsion Perón openly sided with the unions. Bullrich herself was a member of the Montoneros under the nom-de-guerre of "Cali", and active in the Columna Norte subgroup commanded by Rodolfo Galimberti. Galimberti was Bullrich's brother-in-law, as he was married to Bullrich's sister, Julieta. Bullrich has denied being a Montoneros member, and maintains that she was just a member of the JP.

Perón died in 1974 and the Dirty War, an armed conflict between the Montoneros and the military, worsened: the guerrillas resumed the tactics used years before to attempt to remove the current authorities from power. In 1975, Bullrich was arrested for spray-painting political messages on the entrance of the University of Buenos Aires Faculty of Philosophy and Letters, and spent six months in prison. Upon being released, she dropped out of her sociology degree at the University of Buenos Aires and enrolled at the Universidad de Belgrano to study law. She also rejoined the Columna Norte. By the end of 1975, she started dating Marcelo Langieri, secretary of Galimberti. The 1976 coup d'état established a military dictatorship, the National Reorganization Process, that continued the armed conflict against the Montoneros. Montoneros organized an attack on 4 September 1976, that intended to kill a manager of the Sudamtex textile firm. On her way to participate, Bullrich felt that she was being followed and fled. The military had abducted one of the masterminds of the plan and learned about the attack, which allowed them to surprise the Montoneros and kill the whole unit. In January 1977, Galimberti and Bullrich attached an improvised explosive device to the car of Pepe Noguer, mayor of San Isidro. The device exploded, injuring the daughter and the daughter-in-law of the mayor, Ana María Noguer and Hortensia M. de Noguer.

Patricia Bullrich went into exile in 1977 with her partner Marcelo Langieri, first settling in Brazil, and later in Mexico, Spain and France. She was still a member of Montoneros living abroad, until Galimberti cut ties with the organization in 1979. She returned briefly to Argentina in that year, to give birth to her son Francisco and went back to Brazil, which was the country where she spent most of her years in exile.

== Political career ==
Bullrich returned to the country after the 1982 Falklands War. She had conflicts with Dante Gullo over the reorganization of the JP, thinking that it should have its own political leaders rather than follow the older ones. Peronism lost the 1983 Argentine general election, so she joined the internal faction of Antonio Cafiero that sought to renew the party. Peronism returned to power in 1989 when Carlos Menem won the 1989 Argentine general election. She was elected deputy for the Justicialist Party (PJ) in 1993, alongside Erman González. She proposed over two hundred bills, including the Art University law, the Cinema law, and the Leasing Contract law. In 1995, she was named the Legislator of the Year.

Patricia Bullrich left the PJ in 1996 and started New Leadership alongside Gustavo Béliz. She had disagreements with him because she thought that he managed the party unilaterally, without making her part of the decisions. She left the party as a result and, after briefly considering joining the Frepaso, she started another party. Initially named Cambio 97, it was soon renamed "Unión por Todos" (UPT) as the Cambio 97 name had already been registered. The new party did not get enough votes to allow her to be reelected as deputy in the 1997 Argentine legislative election. She then worked for the Buenos Aires Province on security matters, assisting the municipality of Hurlingham. She resigned in 1998, because of conflicts with León Arslanián, minister of justice of the province.

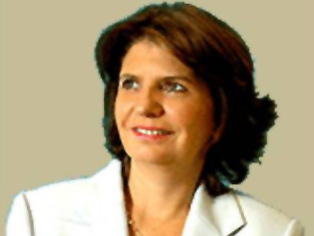
Patricia Bullrich at the time she served as deputy.

In 1999, the UPT became part of the Alliance for Work, Justice and Education, which took Fernando de la Rúa to the Presidency. Bullrich was appointed to office in the Department of Criminal Policy and Penitentiary Matters. In 2001, she was made a cabinet minister, as Secretary of Labour, Employment and Human Resources and, later that year, as Secretary of Social Security. In 2001 she announced a cut of 13% on retirement wages above $574, 16% of all retirees, which would reduce the deficit by 68.6 millions of pesos.

De la Rúa resigned, and eventually the governor of Buenos Aires Eduardo Duhalde was appointed president by the Congress. Bullrich relaunched the UPT in 2002, aiming for the 2003 presidential elections. The party platform announced reforms on labor and education. The UPT did not take part in the elections, supporting instead Ricardo López Murphy of the Recreate for Growth party, who ended in the third place. Both parties united in the alliance "Unión para Recrear Buenos Aires", proposing Bullrich for mayor of Buenos Aires. She ended in the fourth place, with 9.76% of the vote.

The UPT joined forces with the Support for an Egalitarian Republic (ARI) and created the Civic Coalition to run for the 2007 Argentine general election, with Elisa Carrió as a candidate for president. Bullrich ran instead for deputy for Buenos Aires. Her centrist politics and polemical history as a government minister, however, contributed to the disenchantment of a group of left-wing members of ARI who left the Civic Coalition.

=== Minister of Security (2015–2019) ===
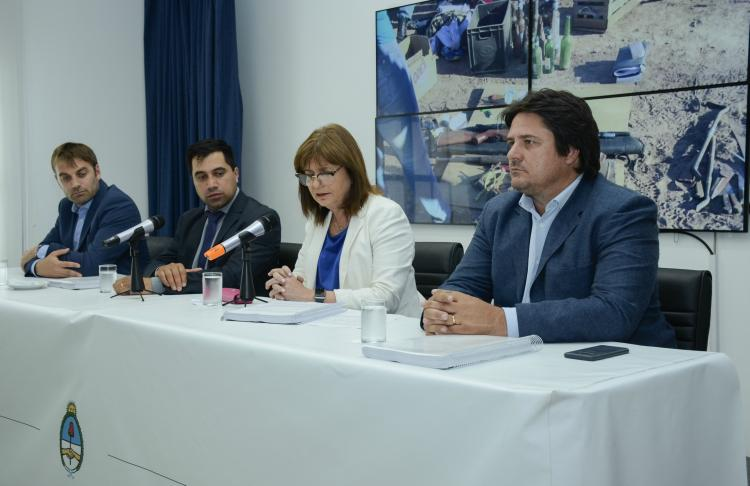
Patricia Bullrich presents a report about the Resistencia Ancestral Mapuche organization.

Mauricio Macri was elected president in 2015 and Patricia Bullrich was appointed Minister of Security. Within the first days, three criminals convicted for torturing and killing three pharmaceutical businessmen escaped from a high-security prison, leading to a nation-wide operation to recapture them. Bullrich announced on 9 January that the three criminals had been captured, but, in reality, only one had been captured. She tendered her resignation to Macri because of the mistake, but Macri rejected it. The other two criminals were captured a few days later.

Bullrich proposed a protocol to remove roadblocks caused by piqueteros. Such blocks should be announced in advance, restrict only part of the roads, and last for a short time. They should cease if ordered so by the police, and those who commit violent actions shall be detained. This protocol was approved by a meeting of the ministers of security of all provinces of Argentina. Horacio Rodríguez Larreta, chief of government of the Buenos Aires city, and María Eugenia Vidal, governor of the Buenos Aires province, refused to endorse it, as they thought that doing so could prove controversial. Instead, they preferred to negotiate and stay on good terms with organizations of piqueteros such as the Evita Movement. Larreta also explained that the city does not need to endorse the protocols because it already has regulations for roadblocks.

Resistencia Ancestral Mapuche (RAM) and the Coordinadora Arauco-Malleco (CAM), two Mapuche organizations that normally operate in Patagonia, expanded their attacks to the city of Buenos Aires. Their goal is to create a Mapuche nation, seceding from Argentina and Chile. Bullrich said that "We won't allow an autonomous mapuche republic inside Argentina; that's the logic of their request, the denial of the Argentine state, the anarchist logic. Our resolution is total and absolute in not allowing a group that uses violence as a way of action in Argentina." Facundo Jones Huala, leader of RAM, claimed to be a political prisoner, and that the RAM only acts in self-defense on lands that used to belong to them. Bullrich organized a joint command with the ministers of security of the Neuquén, Río Negro and Chubut provinces against the RAM, and delivered a report of the actions taken against the organization, including 96 lawsuits, 2 of them for murder.

The Argentine National Gendarmerie forced a group of Mapuche demonstrators to cease a roadblock next to the Chubut River, and the demonstrator Santiago Maldonado went missing after that. The case became a national scandal, with the Gendarmerie (by extension their political authorities, Bullrich and Macri) being accused of an enforced disappearance. Bullrich gave her full support to the Gendarmerie. Maldonado was found dead some months later, drowned in the Chubut river. Bullrich said "The whole world saw what happened with Maldonado. He stayed in the same place where he drowned, without being seen or touched by anyone. Neither the Gendarmerie nor our government would have made a person disappear".

A tourist was stabbed ten times by thieves, who then ran away. The policeman Luis Chocobar shot one of the thieves, claiming that the thief made a movement suggesting he was about to fire a gun. However, a video released by Telefe Noticias showed that the criminal had his back to him. Bullrich, however, pointed out that the video was edited and did not show the exact moment of the gunshot. Bullrich and Macri supported the actions of Chocobar, on the grounds that it would be a right of self-defense, while human rights organizations considered it a case of police brutality. Chocobar was sentenced for homicide four years later.

In November 2018, Bullrich said that "those who wanted to be armed should be allowed to do so", prompting strong criticism and opposition. Adrián Marcenac, father of Alfredo Marcenac, a student from Necochea who was murdered by serial shooter Martín Ríos in July 2006 in Belgrano, Buenos Aires, labelled Bullrich's comments as "enormously grave" for Argentine society.

=== Presidential candidate ===
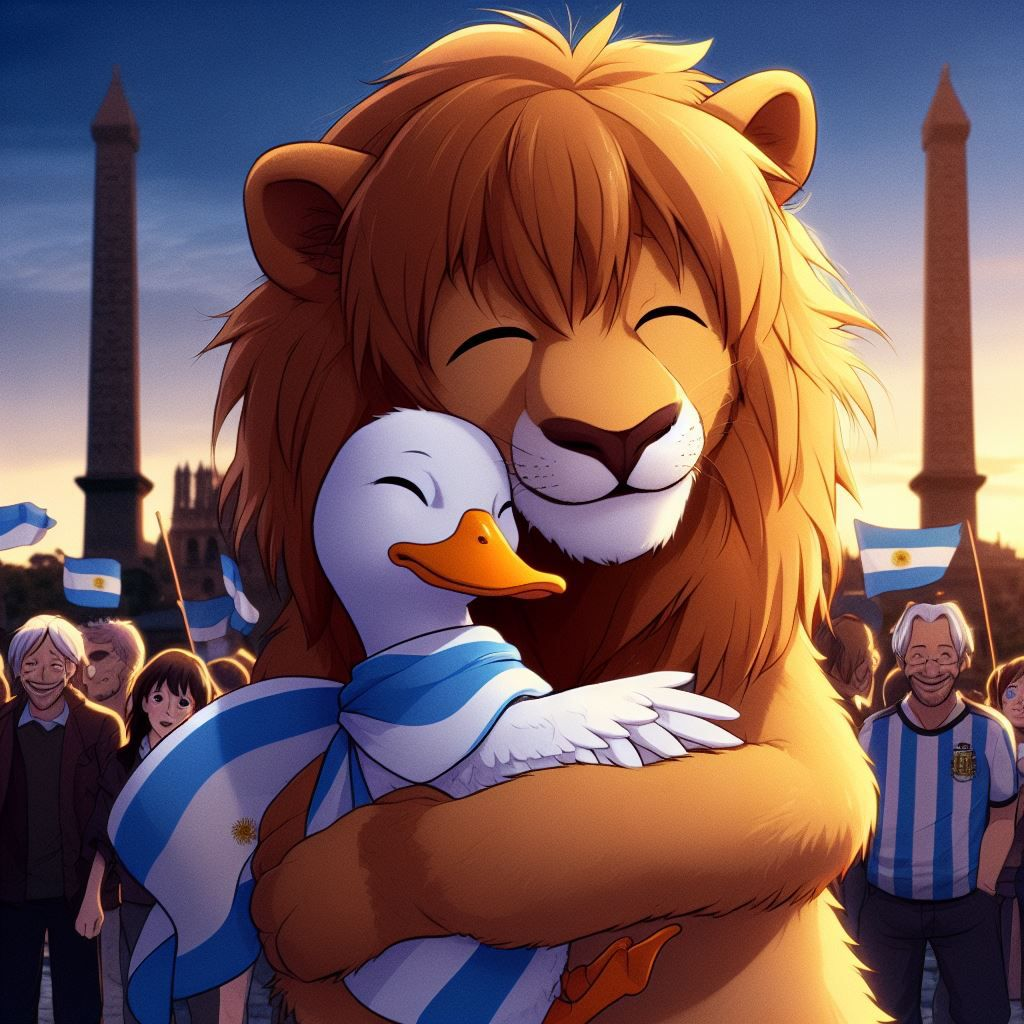
AI image posted by Javier Milei to announce his alliance with Bullrich. Milei associates himself with imagery of lions, and "pato" ("duck") is a common nickname in Spanish for people named "Patricia".

The 2021 Argentine legislative election resulted in a victory for Juntos por el Cambio (JXC), with the libertarian party La Libertad Avanza (LLA) led by Javier Milei, emerging as a significant third party. Bullrich, who was appointed president of the PRO in 2020, maintained a positive relationship with Milei, and at one point considered forming an alliance for the 2023 Argentine general election. However, Milei ultimately decided to run independently with his own party.

There was an expectation that Mauricio Macri would run for president once again, as even in defeat he had gotten 41% of the vote in 2019 and his image had improved since then. However, he declined to do so, so the party had primary elections between Bullrich and Horacio Rodríguez Larreta. They represented the "hawks" and "doves" of the party. Macri did not openly side with any of them. Bullrich chose the former legislator Luis Petri, from the UCR, as the candidate for vice-president. Petri had lost the primary elections for governor of Mendoza to Alfredo Cornejo a short time before. She chose him because he was young, sided with the "hawks", and was not from Buenos Aires; and also because he worked with her during her time as minister of security. As Petri was from the UCR, Bullrich would secure the support of the radicals that were not pleased with the leadership of Gerardo Morales (who supported Larreta), and with the whole party if Larreta was defeated in the primaries. Other politicians briefly considered to run for vice-president under her were Carlos Melconian, Maximiliano Abad, Luis Naidenoff, and Ricardo López Murphy.

Carlos Melconian was proposed instead as Bullrich's potential minister of economy. In contrast with Milei, who proposed a full dollarization of the economy, Melconian proposed instead a bimonetary economy, where both the Argentine peso and the United States dollar would be legal tender. Before implementing it, the fiscal deficit would be eliminated, the by-laws of the Central Bank would be amended to prohibit money creation, and the restrictions on the use of US dollars would be removed. She also proposed the creation of a maximum security prison named after former president Cristina Kirchner.

The primary elections ended with a decisive victory of Bullrich over Larreta. Once the primaries were concluded, the candidates took part in the presidential debates, explaining their positions and proposals over several topics. Bullrich promised to end inflation, and to end the roadblocks caused by piqueteros.

Although the primary elections ended with the three main candidates, Bullrich, Milei and Peronist Sergio Massa in a close tie, Massa got ahead in the general election and won with 36% of the vote, followed by Milei with 30%. As a result, both candidates went to a third ballotage election. Bullrich did not take part in it, as JXC ended in third place, but both candidates sought to get the support of her voters. Massa made a speech about institutional stability and public security, usual topics of the UCR and PRO respectively, and Milei focused on the need to join forces against Kirchnerism. On 25 October 2023, Bullrich officially endorsed Javier Milei for the runoff election. She did not ask the other parties within JXC, the UCR and the CC, for their opinion, as they have conflicting views over Milei. Both of them met the Wednesday after the elections to negotiate this support, alongside Macri. Milei announced the alliance on his X account, with an AI image of an embrace between a lion and a duck. Milei associates himself with imagery of lions, and "pato" ("duck") is a common nickname in Spanish for people named "Patricia".

=== Minister of Security (2023–2025) ===
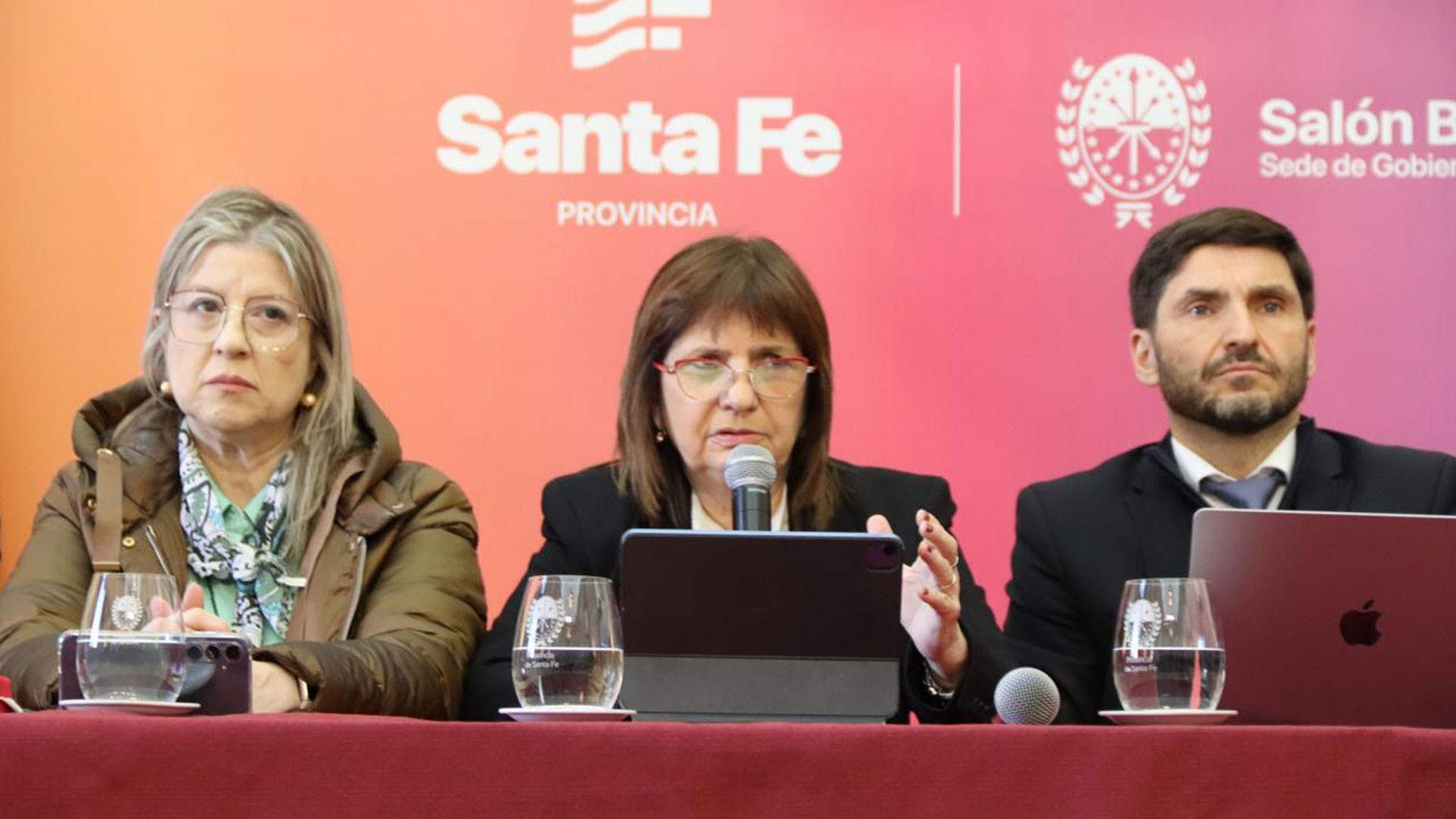
Patricia Bullrich announced a decrease in homicides in Rosario.

In December 2023, Patricia Bullrich returned to government as security minister in president Javier Milei's Cabinet. Bullrich immediately issued a protocol to deal with demonstrations and roadblocks made by piqueteros. The Workers' Party made an habeas corpus request to prevent the protocol from coming into force, which judge Gustavo Pierretti rejected. Several groups of Piqueteros called for a massive demonstration on 20 December, a week after the inauguration of Javier Milei. The government announced that demonstrators who committed crimes during demonstrations, such as roadblocks or vandalism, would lose their welfare payments, and provided a phone number to denounce piquetero leaders who would be coercing people to take part in such demonstrations. The demonstration had very little attendance, and the phone calls were used to start 660 criminal complaints. The policies were kept for all later protests. The welfare aid that was outsourced to piquetero organizations returned to the direct state control, and social leaders that worked at the ministry of Social Development despite the conflict of interest were fired. Several audits also revealed that several social organizations that used to control the outsourced welfare aid only used a fraction of it for such a purpose. All this decreased the power of piqueteros, and protests and demonstrations rapidly decreased in size.

The city of Rosario had ongoing problems with narcotics trafficking cartels, who had moved beyond the illegal drug trade into other illicit activities, such as extortion and contract killing. Bullrich announced the "Plan Bandera" ("Flag plan") with governor of Santa Fe Province Maximiliano Pullaro to deal with the problem. One of the initial actions was to enforce stricter conditions at the local prisons, as several crime bosses were already jailed but managed to control the criminal operations nonetheless. The national government installed mobile phone jammers at those prisons, which led to death threats against Pullaro and his family. Bullrich provided a report of the results of the operation six months later: homicides decreased by 73%, they detained 400 people linked to drug trade, 118 kilograms of cocaine and dope, 50,000 parts of synthetic drugs, 900 kilograms of ammonia, 57,005,062 pesos, 18,050 US dollars and 70 weapons.

Bullrich stayed president of PRO despite being a minister of a government for another party. Initially, both PRO and LLA were allies, but as both parties began to drift apart she sided with Milei's party instead of PRO. Both parties ran for the 2025 legislative elections on their own after the failure of the negotiations to create an electoral alliance. Bullrich took part in electoral parades of LLA, and encouraged politicians close to her move to the party. In May 2025 she formally left the PRO and joined LLA.

Following her election as senator in the 2025 legislative election, on 22 November 2025 President Javier Milei confirmed that Alejandra Monteoliva would be her successor. Bullrich resigned on 1 December 2025 and Monteoliva took office the following day.

== Political positions ==
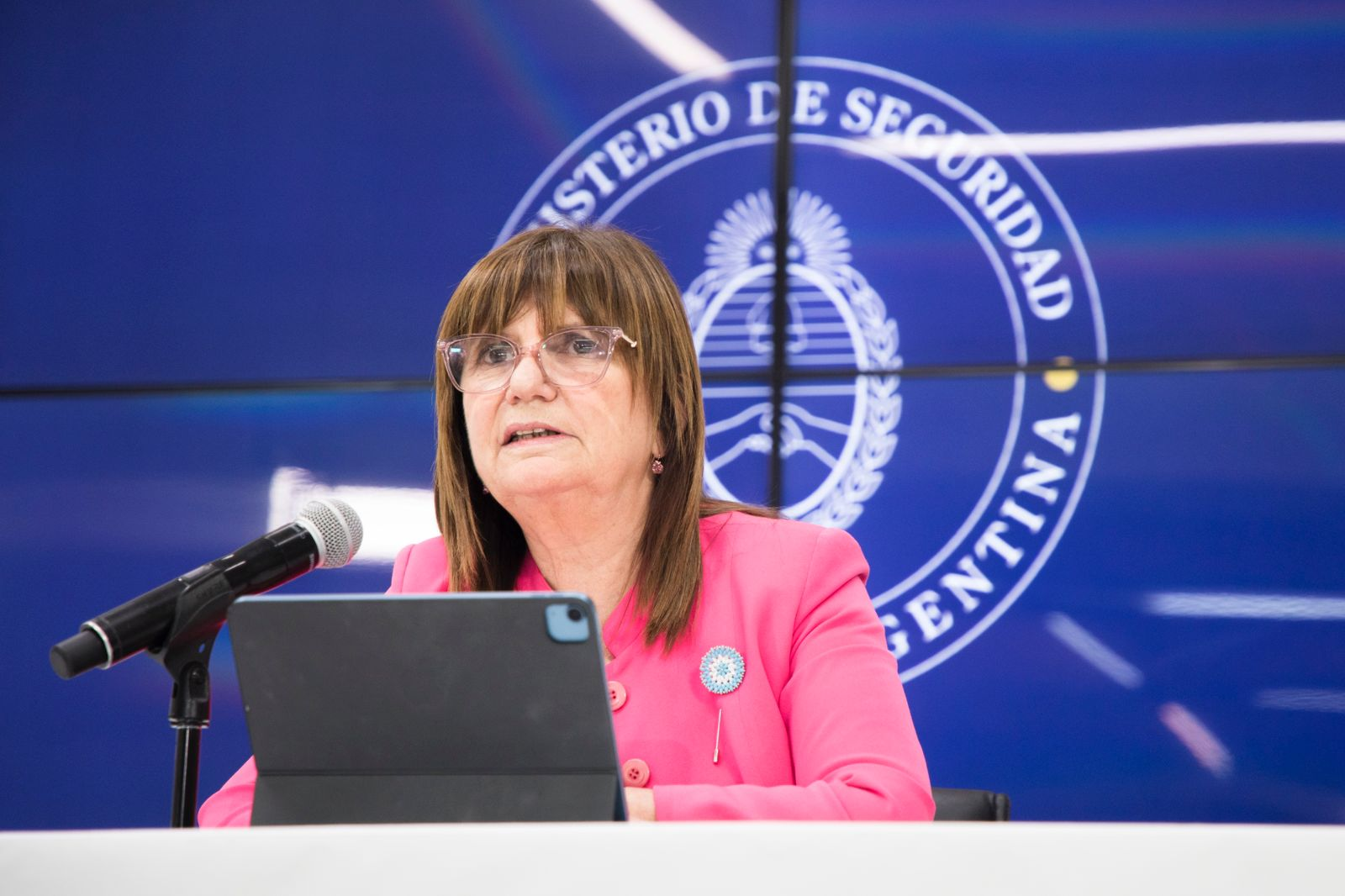
Patricia Bullrich announces new policies against traffic obstructions by piqueteros.

Patricia Bullrich was a member of Peronist guerrillas in her youth, but grew critical of them as an adult. She described the ideas held by those organizations as an improvised blend of nationalism, Christianity and socialism. She explained that back then she thought that she was taking part in a revolution and that the people would eventually get used to it, but eventually realized that revolutions rarely have a positive outcome. She also thinks that she deluded herself by thinking that Peronism had goals that were not its actual goals. She started to have doubts over her allegiance to the guerrillas when she found out that Montoneros had killed the priest Carlos Mugica, and the aide of Perón José Ignacio Rucci. She realized that Montoneros and the People's Revolutionary Army killed people, even if they had not said so openly, and that she was helping that even if from a passive role.

In her book Yo Propongo, written during the presidency of Cristina Kirchner, Bullrich talks about populism and authoritarianism. She considers that democracy in Argentina has been weakened by a dominant-party system coupled with the dismantling of the lead party, which led to a system where only the president has authority, the party is an extension of the president's will, and government and state lost any meaningful difference. She considers that political polarization grew beyond only politics and engulfed other areas as well, such as academics and unions. She also pointed out that the Kirchners may want to organize a set of controlled media to advance a "narrative" that is positive towards their policies and hostile against the opposition. She also considers that this style of government was used by the Kirchners to advance policies that are long outdated in the rest of the world, and to conceal its negative results. In contrast, she proposes to dismantle in politics the dominant-party system, and in economics to advance a sustainable capitalist model.

In relation to the severity of law enforcement, she supports a hardline policy against crime, rejecting the policies of Kirchnerism that grant too many rights to criminals and place rigid controls and obstacles on police work. Although those policies are largely a reaction against the policies of the military dictatorship, Bullrich says that "Argentina must leave the past and look to the future". In particular, she had conflicting views with Sabina Frederic, minister of security of Alberto Fernández, over the use of taser guns, as Frederic restricted the police of the Argentine Federal Police from using either those or regular guns. When she was appointed minister of security by Javier Milei, she said "True change is possible if the law is applied in every corner of the country, equally for everyone and without privileges. Argentina needs order. We will be relentless against crime and we will wage a relentless fight against drug trafficking. It's simple: whoever does something, pays for it".

Patricia Bullrich supported abortion during the debate in 2018 for a bill that would make it legal. She said that it did not make sense that only the woman could go to jail for it. However, she also supported a clause for conscientious objection to abortion from medics that may refuse to do it, and to set a minimum age higher than in the proposed bill. The bill was not approved, and was proposed again in 2020. That time, Bullrich refused to comment her personal opinion on abortion, and considered instead that the country had more pressing economic and societal priorities. For similar reasons, she did not agree with the proposal of Javier Milei to celebrate a referendum to abolish the bill approved in 2020: she said that it would halt the whole country for a couple of months, and that the priority was to solve the economic crisis.

== Electoral history ==
=== Executive ===
Electoral history of Patricia Bullrich
Election	Office	List	Votes			Result	Ref.
Election	Office	List	Total	%	P.	Result	Ref.
2003	Chief of Government of Buenos Aires	Union to Recreate Buenos Aires	171,765	9.76	4th	Not elected	
2023	President of Argentina	Juntos por el Cambio	6,379,023	23.81	3rd	Not elected	

=== Legislative ===
Electoral history of Patricia Bullrich
Election	Office	List	#	District	Votes			Result	Ref.
Election	Office	List	#	District	Total	%	P.	Result	Ref.
1993	National Deputy	Justicialist Party	3	City of Buenos Aires	628,506	32.59%	1st (Note: Presented on an electoral list. The data shown represents the share of the vote the entire party/alliance received in that constituency.)	Elected	
2007	National Deputy	Civic Coalition	1	City of Buenos Aires	279,775	15.29%	1st	Elected	
2011	National Deputy	Civic Coalition	1	City of Buenos Aires	124,245	6.61%	5th	Elected	
2025	National Senator	La Libertad Avanza	1	City of Buenos Aires	854,122	50.42%	1st	Elected	

== Written books ==
- Memorias de la acción. Conversaciones con Albino Gómez
- El desafío argentino. Razones éticas y prácticas para el cambio.
- Yo propongo.
- Desarticulación y hegemonía.
- Guerra sin cuartel: Terminar con la inseguridad en la Argentina.
- De un día para otro: medidas para cambiar de verdad en las primeras 24 horas de gobierno.
