= Iván Germán Velázquez =

- Iván Germán Velázquez in 2026
- Born: Iván Germán Velázquez; April 23, 1979 (age 47); Buenos Aires, Argentina
- Other names: "El Ruso"; Eduard Soler; Ignacio Vélez
- Education: Degree in Security, Blas Pascal University
- Occupations: Businessman, politician, former intelligence officer, security and intelligence specialist, university lecturer

Iván Germán Velázquez (born 23 April 1979) is an Argentine businessman, politician, former intelligence agent, security specialist, and university lecturer. He served in the Argentine Army, worked for the Secretariat of Intelligence (SIDE), and was an officer of the Airport Security Police (PSA), where he was director of counterintelligence.

He later pursued professional and business activities related to security, defence, intelligence, cybersecurity, and the media. He holds a degree in Security from Blas Pascal University, is chief executive officer of Novaris Security, and is director of Adelanto24.

== Biography ==
=== Early life and education ===
Velázquez was born on 23 April 1979 in Buenos Aires. He is the son of Laura María Cristina Durán and surgeon Iván Germán Velázquez.

During his childhood he lived in Villa Ballester, in General San Martín Partido, and later in Mar del Plata, San Justo, and Ramos Mejía.

He attended Juan XXIII Primary School No. 79 in San Justo and completed secondary school at Colegio Nacional Esteban Echeverría in Ramos Mejía, graduating in December 1997 with a secondary-school qualification in social sciences.

He subsequently began training connected with the military sphere and pursued studies related to security, defence, intelligence, and cybersecurity.

He earned a degree in Security from Blas Pascal University. The university awarded him its Silver Medal for Academic Merit after he completed the degree with an average grade of 8.42.

His professional profile published by Adelanto24 also states that he holds master's degrees in Defence Policy and International Security and Cybersecurity, and completed university-level specialist training in International Security and Intelligence Services, Terrorism and Organised Crime Studies, and Citizen Security.

=== Military, police and intelligence career ===
Identification credential of Iván Germán Velázquez as an officer of Argentina's Airport Security Police (PSA).

Velázquez was associated with intelligence activities within the Argentine Army and later carried out work for the Secretariat of Intelligence (SIDE). A 2009 Urgente24 report, reproducing his autobiographical account, described his relationship with Army Intelligence and stated that he had simultaneously performed duties for SIDE.

His professional work was primarily related to intelligence, counterintelligence, security, and information technology.

During his intelligence activities he used the operational name "Ignacio Vélez". According to an autobiographical account reproduced by Urgente24 in 2009, the assumed name was assigned to him for both administrative and operational intelligence duties. In the same account, he said that he used the professional identity of a journalist in the politics section of the state news agency Télam as cover and worked in the Directorate-General for External Collection (DRE), where he dealt with counterterrorism and counter-proliferation.

He later joined the Airport Security Police (PSA), where he was an officer and held the post of director of counterintelligence.

=== Espionage investigation, destabilisation allegations and the "South American Watergate" ===
In 2008, Velázquez became involved in a judicial investigation into an alleged network dedicated to unlawfully obtaining electronic communications belonging to public officials, politicians, journalists, businesspeople, and other public figures.

In the context of that investigation, he was also accused of alleged destabilisation efforts against the government of Cristina Fernández de Kirchner. A Página/12 investigation titled Una marcha que no huele bien linked Velázquez to intelligence activities surrounding an anti-government demonstration and to an alleged political destabilisation operation.

The allegations also arose amid internal disputes among different sectors of Argentina's intelligence services. In a 2015 reconstruction, journalist Gerardo Young described the investigation into Velázquez and other agents in the context of disputes involving, among others, Jaime Stiuso and Fernando Pocino.

Young also linked information attributed to Velázquez's group to the later online publication, through Leakymails, of documents concerning intelligence personnel, including Stiuso.

The judicial investigation was led by federal judge Sandra Arroyo Salgado and involved, among others, former intelligence secretary Juan Bautista Yofre, Pablo Carpintero, retired general Daniel Reimundes, and people connected with journalism and business.

The case attracted public attention, and the electronic espionage operations under investigation were referred to by various media outlets as the "South American Watergate".

In 2015, Perfil described Velázquez as one of the alleged perpetrators of the so-called "South American Watergate" and noted that he had been accused of responsibility for a large-scale electronic espionage operation in Latin America.

Velázquez denied the allegations and later maintained that he had been persecuted because of his confrontation with sectors of the Argentine intelligence services, particularly Jaime Stiuso.

=== Uruguay and asylum request ===
In 2008, Velázquez moved to Uruguay with Pablo Carpintero. Both requested political asylum from the Uruguayan authorities, claiming that they were being persecuted and threatened in Argentina.

The Uruguayan government subsequently rejected the asylum request.

While in Uruguay, Velázquez was investigated by the Uruguayan judiciary in cases concerning access to and use of confidential information. In December 2008 he was prosecuted for giving money to an official of the National Directorate of Migration in order to obtain information about three Argentine citizens described as former SIDE agents who, according to Velázquez, could pose a threat to his life.

He was later remanded in custody on a charge involving fraudulent knowledge of secret documents, in a case connected with information from the Montevideo police.

In April 2011, criminal judge Mariana Mota convicted Velázquez of repeated simple bribery in conjunction with improper use of privileged information and as a co-perpetrator of fraudulent knowledge of a secret document. By then he had already served a period in custody and did not return to prison because the sentence was conditionally suspended.

At the same time, Argentina had requested his extradition to face proceedings related to the disclosure of political and military secrets. Uruguayan judge Roberto Timbal rejected the extradition request, finding that the offences for which he was sought were political in nature and that Velázquez's physical integrity would be "at risk" if he returned to Argentina.

=== Espionage involving Chilean officials and diplomatic repercussions ===
The case acquired an international dimension in 2009, when investigations in Uruguay revealed information relating to Chilean officials and authorities.

La Tercera reported that those affected included officials in the government of President Michelle Bachelet, members of the armed forces, and Chilean diplomatic representatives.

Other media outlets reported that the investigation concerned approximately 38 Chilean authorities and officials.

The episode had diplomatic repercussions between Chile and Argentina. The Chilean government requested information from the Uruguayan authorities and summoned the Argentine ambassador in Santiago, Ginés González García, to seek background information and cooperation in clarifying the events.

=== Alleged links to Peruvian intelligence ===
Investigations in Chile also examined possible links between activities attributed to Velázquez and former members of Peru's intelligence services.

Chilean journalistic investigations linked Velázquez to former Peruvian Navy officers Elías Ponce Feijoo and Carlos Tomasio, who were associated with the security company Business Track (BTR).

According to Chilean intelligence sources cited by the publication, government and Chilean Navy investigations had reportedly identified at least four meetings between Velázquez and the group led by Ponce Feijoo, two of them in Lima. Lawyers for the former Peruvian officers denied those links.

The nature and extent of Velázquez's alleged links to current or former members of Peruvian intelligence were not judicially established.

=== Annulment and dismissal of the Argentine case ===
The investigation initiated in Argentina continued for several years. In late 2015, federal judge Sandra Arroyo Salgado granted a motion to annul proceedings based on irregularities in the collection of evidence and violations of constitutional guarantees.

As a result of the ruling, the challenged proceedings were declared null and the charges were dismissed against the defendants covered by the decision, including Juan Bautista Yofre, Pablo Carpintero, Daniel Reimundes, journalists, businesspeople, and Iván Velázquez.

In Velázquez's case, the ruling also ordered the lifting of the outstanding arrest warrant.

=== Activities in Colombia and Ecuador ===
After his work in Argentine state bodies, Velázquez pursued professional activities related to intelligence and security in other Latin American countries.

Iván Germán Velázquez during security-related activities in the Colombia–Venezuela region, between 2009 and 2012.

In Colombia, he worked as an adviser on intelligence-related activities. Later publications about his career placed this work during a period of significant diplomatic tensions between Colombia and Venezuela.

In 2013, Velázquez was linked to a cyber-defence operation of Ecuador's National Intelligence Secretariat (SENAIN), known as Operation Caminito.

His alleged participation was later described by Pablo Romero, Ecuador's former national intelligence secretary, who identified Velázquez as the specialist known within Operation Caminito by the alias "El Ruso".

Passport in the name of Eduard Soler, an identity attributed to "El Ruso" in connection with Ecuador's SENAIN and Operation Caminito.

Velázquez during security-related work at a border checkpoint in the Colombia–Venezuela region.

The existence and financing of Operation Caminito were later investigated by the Ecuadorian judiciary in a case concerning the use of SENAIN funds.

During the trial, lawyers for former agency officials argued that "El Ruso" had been identified as Iván Germán Velázquez Durán, whose cover identity was "Eduard Soler", and that Operation Caminito had existed. By a majority, the trial panel of the National Court of Justice acquitted the defendants in that case.

Later publications attributed to Velázquez a role in Ecuador's internal political tensions during the presidency of Lenín Moreno. In 2026, Eco Argentino attributed to him a "key operational role" in an alleged political pressure campaign against the then Ecuadorian president.

=== Business and academic activities ===
After his work in state agencies, Velázquez continued his professional career in security, defence, intelligence, and cybersecurity.

He is chief executive officer (CEO) of Novaris Security, a private company providing services and consultancy related to security, defence, intelligence, and cybersecurity.

He has also worked as a university lecturer and carried out academic work related to intelligence, international security, cybersecurity, and influence operations.

His academic work includes Influence operations in the digital environment as a threat to the security of the European Union, produced in connection with the International Campus for Security and Defence (CISDE) and CEU San Pablo University.

=== Media activities ===
Velázquez is also active in the digital media sector.

Velázquez during the programme Sin Perdón a Nadie on Radio Rebelde.

He is director of Adelanto24, according to the outlet's institutional profile. Adelanto24 in turn identifies the outlet as belonging to Asura Group.

=== Political activity ===
Velázquez's participation in political activity dates back at least to the late 1990s. In 1999, La Nación identified him as a member of Cóndor, a group the newspaper characterised as ultranationalist. That year, when he was 20, he was detained with other members of the organisation and questioned by federal authorities over alleged public-order offences.

Decades later, Velázquez again participated publicly in Argentine politics. He was part of the group that launched the political movement Reacción Nacional, alongside Gastón Alberdi, Pedro Vissio, Pablo Nicolei, Emiliano Ayerdi, and others.

The movement's launch was announced publicly through its members' social-media accounts. In the launch post, Velázquez was among those who jointly announced the start of Reacción Nacional and invited others to participate.

=== Views on technology and surveillance ===
Velázquez has participated publicly in debates concerning intelligence, cybersecurity, electronic surveillance, defence, and emerging technologies.

In 2026, he expressed concern about the expansion of video-surveillance systems, facial recognition, and large-scale data processing, and argued for institutional oversight of the use of these technologies.

== Awards and distinctions ==
- In June 2021, Velázquez placed eighth worldwide on the EC-Council Global Ethical Hacking Leaderboard for the second quarter of 2021, with a score of 80%. The ranking listed him as representing Argentina and professionally affiliated with Novaris Security.
