= Arturo Puricelli =

Argentine lawmaker

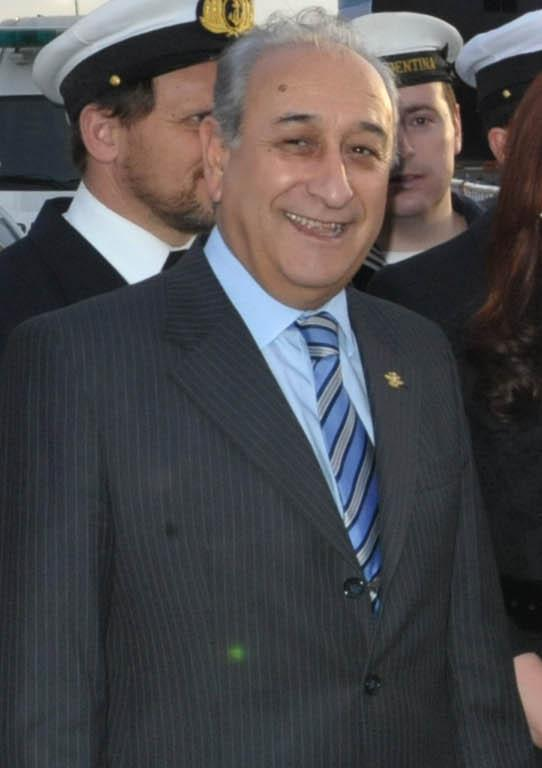
- Puricelli in 2011

Minister of Security of Argentina
- In office June 3, 2013 – December 4, 2013
- President: Cristina Fernández de Kirchner
- Preceded by: Nilda Garré
- Succeeded by: María Cecilia Rodríguez

Minister of Defense of Argentina
- In office December 15, 2010 – June 3, 2013
- President: Cristina Fernández de Kirchner
- Preceded by: Nilda Garré
- Succeeded by: Agustín Rossi

Governor of Santa Cruz Province
- In office December 10, 1983 – December 10, 1987
- Preceded by: Antonio López
- Succeeded by: Ricardo del Val

Personal details
- Born: October 8, 1947 (age 78) Río Gallegos
- Education: National University of the Littoral

Arturo Puricelli (born October 8, 1947) is an Argentine lawmaker. He served as Governor of Santa Cruz Province (1983–87), and as the country's Minister of Defense (2010–13) and Security (2013).

== Life and times ==
Arturo Antonio Puricelli was born in Santa Cruz Province, Argentina. He enrolled at the National University of the Littoral, and became affiliated with the populist Justicialist Party. Earning a law degree in 1973, he returned to Santa Cruz, was named Inspector General of the Provincial Justice Ministry, and in 1975, was appointed Minister of Social Policy.

He started a private law practice, Puricelli & Associates, after the March 1976 coup, when nearly all elected officials were removed. The dictatorship ultimately called for elections in 1983, and Puricelli secured his party's nomination as a candidate for governor of Santa Cruz. The victorious Puricelli was among the youngest and, with 56% of the vote, the third-most decisively elected governor that year.

His rival in the primaries, a young banking attorney, Néstor Kirchner, was appointed head of the Provincial Social Security Fund by the new governor. Puricelli hoped this might earn his fledgling administration greater backing from Kirchner's supporters, but the move backfired when in April 1984, the latter refused the governor's request for borrowing from the fund to cover the provincial deficit. As governor, Puricelli pursued a greater share of the hundreds of millions of dollars in fossil fuel royalties generated largely by the then-state owned oil concern, YPF, and sued the federal government to that effect. He also strove to diversify his remote province's economy, and established the resort town of El Chaltén by way of promoting tourism.

Constitutionally barred from seeking re-election upon the end of his term in 1987, Puricelli was elected President of the Santa Cruz chapter of the Justicialist Party. He supported veteran party figure Antonio Cafiero, who had just been elected Governor of Buenos Aires Province, as his party's nominee ahead of the 1989 presidential elections, and obtained the support of numerous Santa Cruz Justicialists, including Kirchner, for Cafiero's Renewal Front ticket. The support of the new governor, Ricardo del Val, for a dark horse candidate, La Rioja Governor Carlos Menem, proved decisive, however, and Menem won 80% of the Santa Cruz vote during the 1988 primary. He became the Justicialist nominee, and was elected president the following year.

Puricelli was elected to the Argentine Chamber of Deputies during the same elections. He ran again for governor in 1991, but was defeated in the primaries by Kirchner, who at the time enjoyed President Menem's support. Having refused to campaign for Menem during the general election, Puricelli adopted a more pragmatic stance towards the president during the latter's 1989–99 administration, and in 1996, he was named head of the state postal service, Encotesa; Puricelli served in a caretaker capacity ahead of the postal carrier's 1997 privatization.

He returned to Santa Cruz and in 1997 was elected to the Provincial Lower House, where despite his differences with Governor Kirchner, he voted in favor of allowing the governor to manage the province's growing oil and gas royalties on an off-budget basis. He later returned to Buenos Aires as vice-president of the National Airports Regulatory Agency (ORSNA).

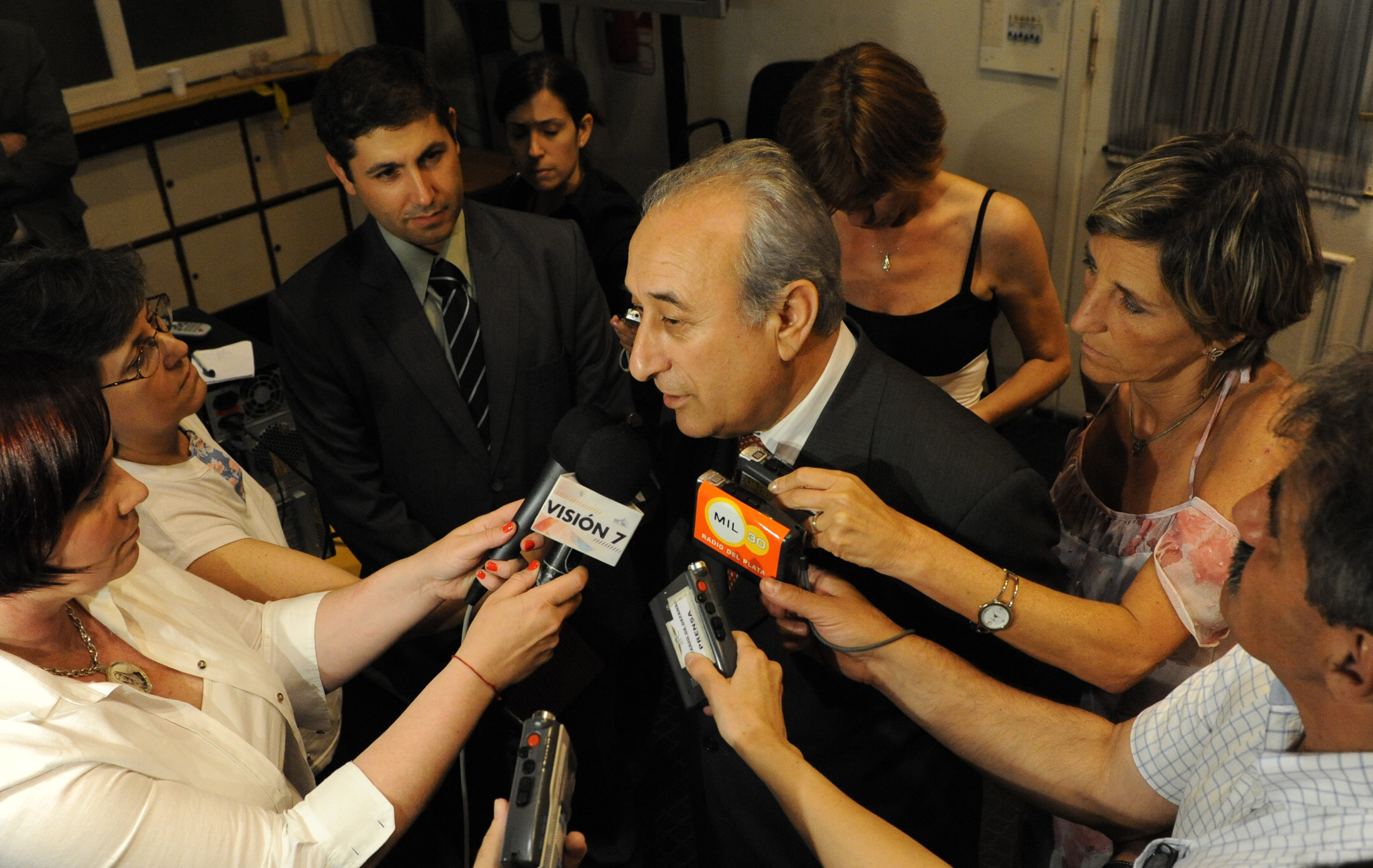
Puricelli faces the press following his 2010 appointment as Defense Minister.

Puricelli joined the center-left Alliance, at the time the main party in opposition. Still at ORSNA when he switched parties in 1999, this gambit resulted in his dismissal, as well as in his being expelled from the Justicialist Party. He ran as a candidate for governor in that year's elections, and was again defeated by Kirchner.

Following the collapse of the Alliance government at the end of 2001, however, Puricelli returned to the Justicialist fold as secretary of provincial affairs for President Eduardo Duhalde. This relationship, too, soured when Duhalde announced his endorsement of Governor Kirchner for presidential elections held in 2003, and Puricelli resigned his post. He ran unsuccessfully for Congress, and retired to his ranch in scenic Los Antiguos, where he raised sheep and cultivated cherry orchards.

Declaring himself to harbor "irreconcilable differences" with Kirchner, who became president, Puricelli would become Kirchner's surprise pick to head the state-owned Fabricaciones Militares, the nation's largest defense contractor, in 2006. Following the designation of Defense Minister Nilda Garré at the head of the powerful new Ministry of Security, Puricelli was appointed to replace her on December 15, 2010. The president nominated him to the post of Minister of Security on May 30, 2013. Following a cabinet reshuffle in December, Puricelli stepped down; he was succeeded by Emergency Assistance Secretary María Cecilia Rodríguez.
