= Nilda Garré =

Argentine lawyer, politician, and diplomat

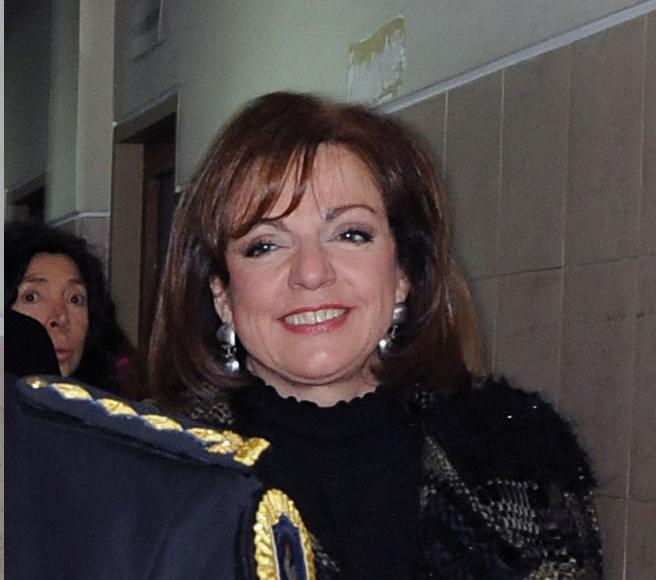
- Nilda Garré as Security Minister in 2011

National Deputy
- In office 10 December 2015 – 10 December 2019
- Constituency: City of Buenos Aires
- In office 10 December 2001 – 26 June 2005
- Constituency: City of Buenos Aires
- In office 10 December 1995 – 20 October 2000
- Constituency: City of Buenos Aires
- In office 25 May 1973 – 24 March 1976
- Constituency: City of Buenos Aires

Argentine Ambassador to the Organization of American States
- In office 18 September 2013 – 10 December 2015
- Preceded by: Martín Gómez Bustillo
- Succeeded by: Juan José Arcuri

Minister of Security
- In office 15 December 2010 – 3 June 2013
- President: Cristina Fernández de Kirchner
- Preceded by: Julio Alak (as Minister of Justice)
- Succeeded by: Arturo Puricelli

Minister of Defense
- In office 28 November 2005 – 15 December 2010
- President: Cristina Fernández de Kirchner; Néstor Kirchner
- Preceded by: José Pampuro
- Succeeded by: Arturo Puricelli

Argentine Ambassador to Venezuela
- In office 1 June 2005 – 1 December 2005
- President: Néstor Kirchner
- Preceded by: Eduardo Sadous
- Succeeded by: Alicia Castro

Personal details
- Born: November 3, 1945 (age 80) Buenos Aires, Argentina
- Party: Broad Front (since 1995); Justicialist Party (1969–1995)
- Other political affiliations: Front for Victory (2003–2019)
- Spouse: Juan Manuel Abal Medina (1973-82)
- Education: Universidad del Salvador

Nilda Celia Garré (born November 3, 1945) is an Argentine lawyer, politician, and diplomat. She was Minister of Defense during the presidency of the late Nestor Kirchner and remained in this position, and as Minister of Security, under President Cristina Fernández de Kirchner. She was the first woman in her country's history to serve in either office. She also served as the Argentine Representative to the OAS. She served numerous terms as a member of the Argentine Chamber of Deputies, the latest one from 2015 to 2019.

== Early life and career ==
Garré was born in the San Telmo barrio of Buenos Aires, and earned a law degree from the Universidad del Salvador when she was 22 years old. Her father, Raúl Garré, was a Peronist member of the Buenos Aires Province Chamber of Deputies until the 1955 coup against President Juan Perón in 1955.

Elected in the March 1973 Peronist landslide, Garré became the youngest woman elected to Congress in Argentina to that date, and was among those on the flight that returned Perón to Argentina. She married Juan Manuel Abal Medina, who then was the Secretary-General of the Justicialist Party, in 1973.

== Legislative career ==
Following Perón's break with his party's left wing, Garré was among a group eight left-wing Peronists expelled from the Justicialist Party caucus in the Lower House in January 1974. She remained in Congress until its dissolution by the military dictatorship installed during the March 1976 coup. Informed, as were most lawmakers, that leftist elected officials would be targeted for imprisonment or assassination, she sought refuge with her husband at the Mexican Embassy, where Abal Medina remained for the next six years. She later joined the Center for Legal and Social Studies (CELS), a legal aid foundation established in 1979 to defend the human rights of those targeted by the dictatorship and request habeas corpus for these political prisoners. Obtaining safe conduct in 1982, Abal Medina sought exile in Mexico City and, after this separation, the couple were finally divorced.

Garré became an ally of Catamarca Province Senator Vicente Saadi and of Peronist Renewal leader Antonio Cafiero upon the return of democracy in elections in 1983. She was given a post in a National Automobile Registry office, but reentered politics after President Carlos Menem's turn to the right during the early 1990s. She joined Chacho Álvarez's leftist Frente Grande (Broad Front) in 1993, and was returned to the Chamber of Deputies in 1995 on the FrePaSo list formed by the Broad Front and other progressive parties. She was named Deputy Interior Minister by Minister Federico Storani in October 2000. The government of President Fernando de la Rúa of the Radical Civic Union, which was backed by FrePaSo in an Alliance, was in crisis, however, and Garré resigned in protest over the appointment of conservative economist Ricardo López Murphy as Minister of Economy of Argentina in March 2001.

She returned to the Chamber of Deputies in 2001, serving until 2005. Garré served briefly as Ambassador to Venezuela in 2005, and helped organize demonstrations led by Venezuelan President Hugo Chávez at the 4th Summit of the Americas against U.S. President George W. Bush and the proposed Free Trade Area of the Americas.

== Minister of defense and security ==
Garré meets with U.S. Defense Secretary Robert Gates at the Pentagon

Garré was recalled to join the government of President Néstor Kirchner as Defense Minister in November, becoming the first woman to hold that post in Argentina. She implemented numerous significant changes during her tenure, including policies promoting jointness (in the Argentine vernacular, conjuntez) within the Argentine Armed Forces and those emphasizing civilian leadership in national defense matters; until then each one of the armed forces had had a virtual autonomy on budget, procurement, organization and deployment.

Garré was named to head the powerful new Ministry of Security, established in December 2010 by President Cristina Fernández de Kirchner. The distribution of the Clarín and La Nación newspapers was blocked on March 27, 2011, and, according to one of these newspapers, the police did not act to prevent or stop this; the Argentine Federal Police operates under the aegis of the new Security Ministry. This was not the first time this had happened, and the government had already been enjoined by the judiciary to prevent further blockades. The Radical Civic Union (the largest party in opposition in the Argentine Senate) proposed Garré's impeachment following this incident, albeit unsuccessfully. Garré has also reaped criticism by officials in Buenos Aires Mayor Mauricio Macri's administration for her decision to withdraw Federal Police officers from the city's hospitals, schools, subway stations, and other public places.

Her successor at the Defense Ministry, Arturo Puricelli, was nominated by the president on May 30, 2013, to succeed her as Security Minister; she in turn was nominated as Argentine Representative to the Organization of American States. She resigned in 2015, when she was elected deputy for the Argentine Congress.

Garré is one of numerous South American women who, around 2005, assumed leadership positions traditionally held by men. This group includes Chilean President Michelle Bachelet and Garré's compatriot, Felisa Miceli, who served as Minister of Economy. This would later include Brazilian President Dilma Rousseff and Argentine President Fernández de Kirchner.
