= Airport Security Police (Argentina) =

Airport Security Police Policía de Seguridad Aeroportuaria
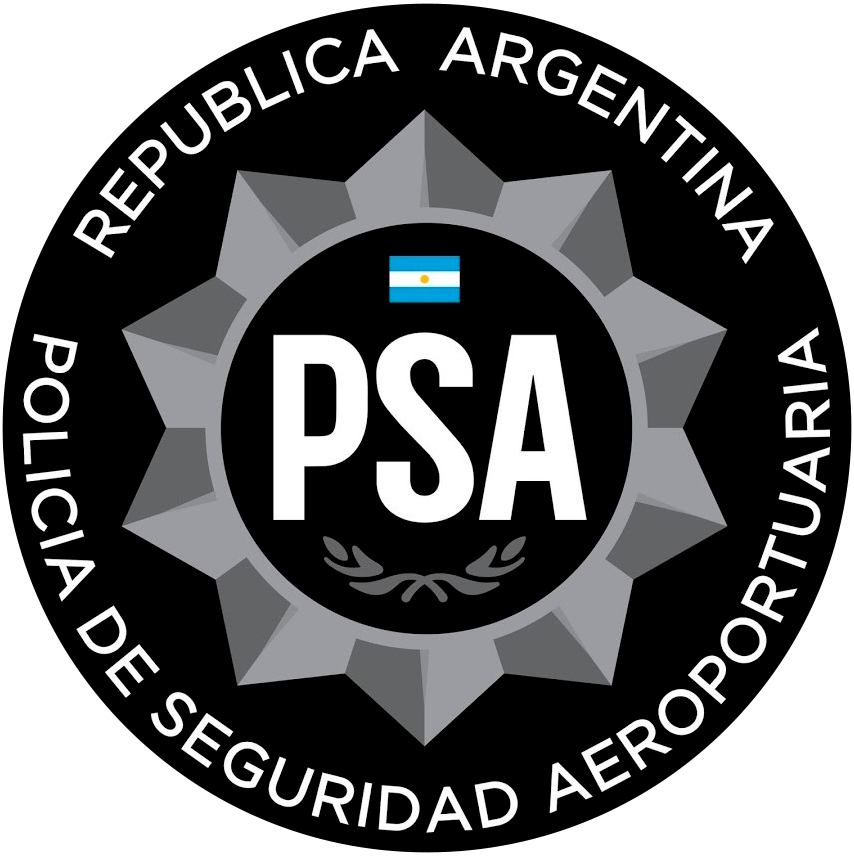
- Abbreviation: PSA

Agency overview
- Formed: 2005; 21 years ago

Jurisdictional structure
- Operations jurisdiction: Argentina
- General nature: Civilian police

Operational structure
- Headquarters: Ezeiza
- Agency executive: Alfredo Gallardo, Director
- Parent agency: Ministry of Security

Website
- argentina.gob.ar/psa

The Airport Security Police (Spanish: Policía de Seguridad Aeroportuaria, "PSA") is an Argentine law enforcement agency created to protect and guard national public airports. It was the first federally owned police institution, managed by civilians, to be created after Argentina's return to democracy in 1983.

The enforcement is supervised by the Ministry of Security.

== Formation ==
On February 22, 2005, the national government, via Néstor Kirchner's presidential Decree No. 145/2005, transferred - structurally and functionally - the militarized National Aeronautical Police (Spanish: Policía Aeronautica Nacional, or "PAN") from within the Ministry of Defence to the Interior Ministry's orbit, creating the Airport Security Police, and joining it to the Homeland Security System.

The decree also formalized the adoption of civil administration to this new police force, in order to restructure and normalize it. Marcelo Saín was appointed as director.

== Functions ==
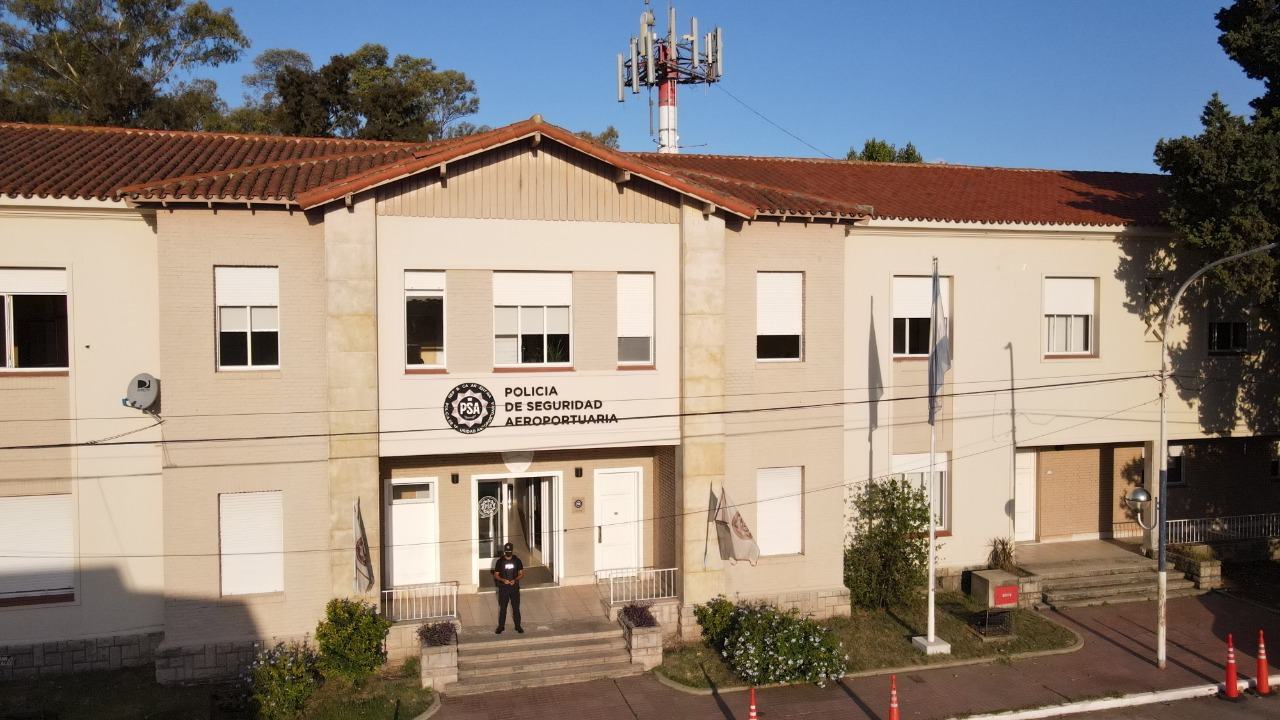
PSA headquarters in Ezeiza

The mission of the Airport Security Police (PSA) is airport security. This is understood as a specific aspect of public safety, and includes actions to protect and safeguard internal security within the jurisdiction of airports, through prevention, intelligence gathering and investigation of crimes and offenses that are not covered by the Aeronautics Code. PSA is therefore in charge of:

- Airport preventive safety, which includes the planning, implementation, evaluation and / or coordination of activities and operations, at the tactical and strategic levels - necessary for counteracting, averting and investigating crimes and offenses in the ambit of the airport.
- Complex airport safety, consisting of the design, implementation and / or coordination of activities and operations - at the tactical and strategic levels - necessary for control and counteraction of complex criminal acts committed by criminal organizations, related to drug trafficking, terrorism, smuggling and other related offenses.

Unlike most police forces the ASP sports only an officers corps and no other ranks.
