= White Helmets Commission =

Argentine humanitarian assistance agency

- Comisión de Cascos Blancos
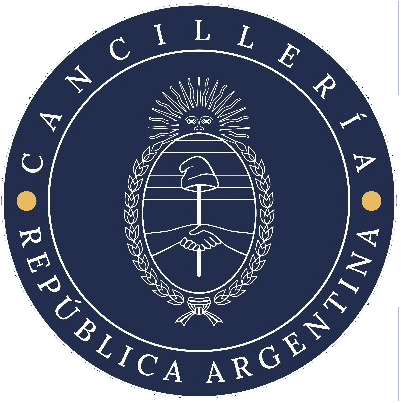

Agency overview
- Formed: 1998; 27 years ago
- Headquarters: Buenos Aires
- Parent agency: Ministry of Foreign Affairs and Worship
- Website: cancilleria.gob.ar/cascosblancos

The White Helmets Commission (Spanish: Comisión de Cascos Blancos) is a body of the Argentine Ministry of Foreign Affairs, International Trade and Worship in charge of designing and implementing international humanitarian assistance. It has a network of bilateral and multilateral cooperation links through which it coordinates immediate response to social-natural disasters; it works on rehabilitation, reconstruction and development tasks; and it promotes risk prevention and management, in Argentina and abroad.

== History ==
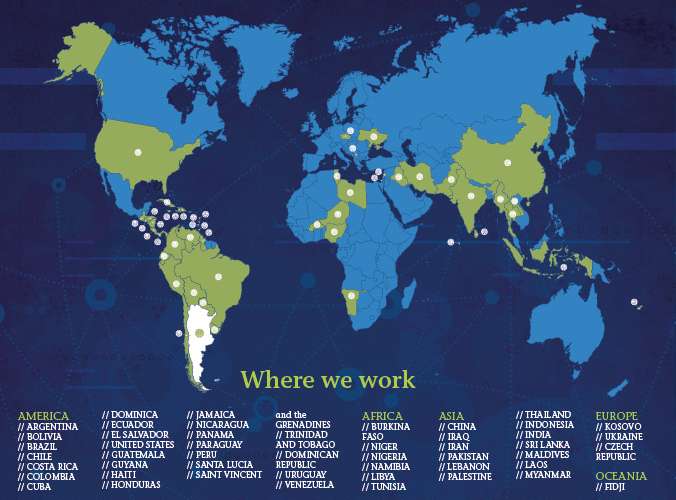
White Helmets worldwide activities

White Helmets has its origins in 1994, in the "Commission against Hunger and Poverty", an international civil body created to combat those social problems. This body marked the beginning of the participation of developing countries in the provision of international humanitarian assistance, which until then has been reserved for donor countries, and introduced the use of volunteers as a specialized professional corps.

In that year, United Nations General Assembly adopted and approved the Commission as an Initiative, named it White Helmets and incorporated into its agenda the response to man-made or natural disasters, conflicts and emergency situations of any kind.

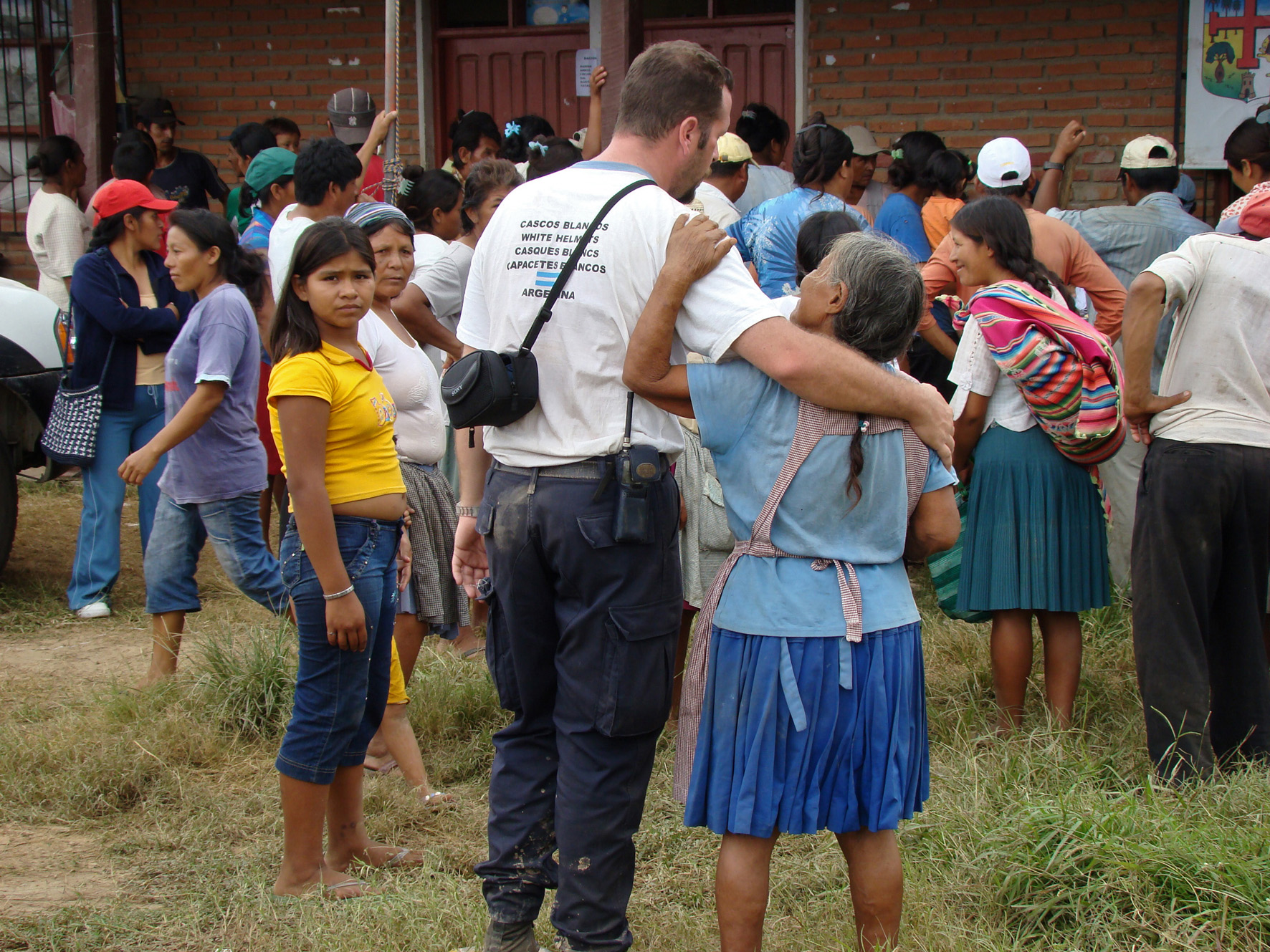
White Helmets volunteer corps in Bolivia, February 2014

Thus, the White Helmets Commission extended its reach to other aspects included in the concept of complex humanitarian emergency. It embraced the purpose of supporting UN activities within the sphere of emergency humanitarian assistance and of rehabilitation, reconstruction and development in times of transition. Furthermore, it was established that the Commission would act pursuant to the guidelines of the Department of Humanitarian Affairs (Office for the Coordination of Humanitarian Affairs —OCHA— since 1998) and work in coordination with the United Nations Volunteers (UNV) Programme, which deploys personnel for missions.

Since then, the UN General Assembly has renewed its support for the Initiative every three years, highlighting the importance of the Argentine experience in addressing humanitarian crises, through the organization of volunteer corps. The most recent expression of support was at the 67th UN Assembly, in 2012.

At a regional level, in 1995, the General Assembly of the Organization of American States (OAS) adopted the White Helmets Initiative, thus contributing to its consolidation.
