= Hans Holzhaider =

German journalist (born 1946)

Hans Holzhaider (born on 25 July 1946) is a German journalist.

== Career ==
Holzhaider was born in Miesbach, (Germany), and studied American literary history, politics and journalism at the Humboldt University of Berlin and LMU Munich. In 1974, he obtained his doctorate with an analysis in critique of ideology of American consumer literature from 1865 to 1885. After a newspaper traineeship at the Heilbronner Stimme News in 1976, he was an editor at the Sunday page of the Evangelical Lutheran Church in Bavaria. In 1978, he moved to South German newspaper "Süddeutsche Zeitung" and is since 1996 among others court reporter. The first trial he reported was a criminal case between 1995 and 1996 Souhaila Andrawes and her involvement in the "Landshut" pane abduction. He also reported about the Manfred Genditzki murder trial. He also criticized the Munich Regional Court II did not follow the basics in dubio pro reo.

== Awards ==
- In 1993 Holzhaider – along with Michael Stiller, Klaus Ott, Christiane Schlötzer-Scotland (Süddeutsche Zeitung) and Fridolin Engelfried (Augsburger Allgemeine) – for reporting on the so-called Amigo affair with the Guardian Award of the German daily press (2nd prize) awarded.
- For his text The naked madness, published on 14 December 2012, Page Three the German newspaper Süddeutsche Zeitung, in June 2013, Holzhaider was awarded with the Herbert Riehl Heyse Award.
- 2014 with Sophie Rohrmeier (also at Süddeutsche Zeitung) the Karl Buchrucker Award of the Inner Mission Munich. Articles about the inadequate situation of prisoners in Bavarian prisons, especially the rare psychological treatment and insufficient rehabilitation awarded.

== Publications ==
- Literaturwissenschaft als Gesellschaftswissenschaft. Eine ideologiekritische Analyse amerikanischer Konsumliteratur 1865–1885 (Literary science as a social science. An ideology-critical analysis of American consumer literature 1865–1885), Kronberg/Taunus: Scriptor, 1976.
- Vor Sonnenaufgang. Das Schicksal der jüdischen Bürger Dachaus (Before sunrise. The fate of the Jewish citizens of Dachau), in Süddeutsche Zeitung, 2006.
