= Mogadischu (film) =

2008 film

- Promotional poster
- Written by: Maurice Philip Remy
- Directed by: Roland Suso Richter
- Starring: Thomas Kretschmann; Nadja Uhl; Saïd Taghmaoui; Herbert Knaup; Christian Berkel
- Music by: Martin Todsharow
- Country of origin: Germany
- Original language: German

Production
- Producers: Gabriela Sperl; Nico Hofmann; Jürgen Schuster
- Running time: 108 minutes

Original release
- Release: 30 November 2008

Mogadischu is a 2008 German made-for-TV thriller film chronicling the events surrounding the hijacking of Lufthansa Flight 181 by the Popular Front for the Liberation of Palestine in 1977. Directed by Roland Suso Richter, it was first shown on public broadcasting channel Das Erste on 30 November 2008.

== Synopsis ==
On 13 October 1977, Lufthansa Flight 181, a Boeing 737-230 Adv named Landshut, is on its way from the vacation island of Mallorca to Frankfurt when it is hijacked by a team of four terrorists representing the Popular Front for the Liberation of Palestine. They demand the release of several leaders of the Red Army Faction (RAF) who are imprisoned in Germany. German Chancellor Helmut Schmidt refuses to negotiate with terrorists, aware that he is endangering not only the lives aboard the Landshut, but also that of German business leader Hanns Martin Schleyer, who is being held hostage by the RAF.

The plane makes its way through several stops to Aden in South Yemen, where the captain, Jürgen Schumann, is murdered by the hijackers. The plane continues on its way, eventually landing in Mogadishu, Somalia. As flight attendant Gabriele Dillmann and the surviving crew try their best to keep their passengers safe and calm, Colonel Ulrich Wegener leads the German federal police's newly formed counter-terrorism unit, GSG 9, in preparations to storm the Landshut.

In the night between 17 and 18 October, Schmidt gives Wegener the order to storm the plane and free the hostages. Somali ranger units create a fire as a distraction, allowing members of GSG 9 to approach the Landshut from behind. Operation "Feuerzauber" is successful, with all hostages rescued. Three hijackers are gunned down and killed, the fourth is seriously injured. One GSG 9 member and a flight attendant are injured. Schmidt is informed by phone that "the job is done."

== Cast ==
- Thomas Kretschmann as Jürgen Schumann, captain of Lufthansa Flight 181
- Nadja Uhl as Gabriele Dillmann, a flight attendant aboard Flight 181
- Saïd Taghmaoui as Zohair Youssif Akache, the leader of the hijackers
- Herbert Knaup as Lieutenant Colonel Ulrich Wegener, Commander of the GSG 9; Operations Manager of Operation "Feuerzauber"
- Jürgen Tarrach as Hans-Jürgen Wischnewski, state minister in the German Chancellery
- Christian Berkel as Helmut Schmidt, Chancellor of Germany
- Simon Verhoeven as Jürgen Vietor, co-pilot
- Tobias Licht as Baum
- Cornelia Schmaus as Lyvia Vamos
- Valerie Niehaus as Birgitt Röhll
- Youssef Hamid as Wadie Haddad, head of the Popular Front for the Liberation of Palestine
- Gernot Kunert as Hanns Martin Schleyer, German business leader and hostage of the Red Army Faction
- Franz Dinda as Peter-Jürgen Boock, a member of the RAF
- Bettina Hoppe as Brigitte Mohnhaupt, a member of the RAF
- Sofi Mohamed as Siad Barre, president of Somalia

== Production ==
Filming took place between October and December 2007, at locations in Munich, Berlin, Ulm, Bonn, and Casablanca. The working title was Mogadischu Welcome.
