= Holzhaider =

Holzhaider is a surname. Notable people with the surname include:

- Hans Holzhaider (born 1946), German journalist
- Rainer Holzhaider (born 1956), Austrian rower
