= I've Never Been Happier =

- Directed by: Alexander Adolph
- Starring: Devid Striesow; Nadja Uhl
- Release date: 9 April 2009
- Running time: 1h 32min
- Country: Germany
- Language: German

I've Never Been Happier (German: So glücklich war ich noch nie) is a 2009 German drama film directed by Alexander Adolph.

== Cast ==
- Devid Striesow - Frank Knöpfel
- Nadja Uhl - Tanja
- Jörg Schüttauf - Peter Knöpfel
- Floriane Daniel - Marie Knöpfel
- Elisabeth Trissenaar - Fritzi
- Thorsten Merten - Schlickenrieder
- Hansa Czypionka - Günther
- Heinz-Josef Braun - Dieter
- Marc Zwinz - Bewährungshelfer Schuhmacher
- Margret Völker - Vorarbeiterin Putzfirma
- Norbert Hülm - Herr Lottner
- Leonie Brandis - Jeanette
- Elzemarieke de Vos - Mietinteressentin
- Patrick Diemling - Junger Mann
