= Richard W. Higgins =

- Born: August 21, 1922; Framingham, Massachusetts, U.S.
- Died: April 5, 1957 (aged 34); Fürstenfeldbruck, West Germany
- Military career
- Allegiance: United States Air Force
- Rank: Major (posthumously awarded)
- Unit: 7330th Flying Training Wing

Richard W. Higgins (August 21, 1922 – April 5, 1957) was a jet pilot with the United States Army Air Forces (USAF). A member of the 7330th Flying Training Wing in Germany, Higgins died in an aircraft accident. He is cited as one of four exemplars of bravery in the history of the German Air Force.

== Biography ==
=== Early life and career ===
Higgins was born in Framingham, Massachusetts. He gave up his studies at Norwich University in Northfield, Vermont, to become a pilot of the United States Army Air Forces. In early 1944, he married his wife Elisabeth, and shortly afterwards he received his wings.

After a brief period as a civilian after World War II, he joined the USAF again as fighter pilot in 522d Fighter-Escort Squadron in the Korean War.

=== Fürstenfeldbruck and Fürstenfeldbruck Air Base ===
In 1957 the family resided in Fürstenfeldbruck in Southern Germany. Fürstenfeldbruck had been the site of an Air Base since 1936. The Fliegerhorst was used by the Luftwaffe before and during World War II. After the war, the United States Air Force 70th Fighter Wing took over the facilities.

In 1955, the French, British and American occupation of Germany ended, and permission was given to the West German government to re-establish its armed forces. In 1957 Fürstenfeldbruck Air Base became a joint-use facility with the new West German Air Force. Starting in November 1953, the 7330th Flying Training Wing was activated at Fürstenfeldbruck. Its mission was to provide upgrading and instructor training for students of MAP (Mutual Assistance Pact) – recipient countries in T-33 trainers; to operate and maintain Fürstenfeldbruck Air Base; provide administrative and logistical support for tenant units; prepare for the reception and provide necessary support for tactical units using Fürstenfeldbruck as a staging base; and to operate and maintain the Siegenburg gunnery range.

Higgins was an experienced member of the 7330th Flying Training Wing, with a total flight log of 2476 hours, including 670 hours on the F-84F.

== Fatal accident ==
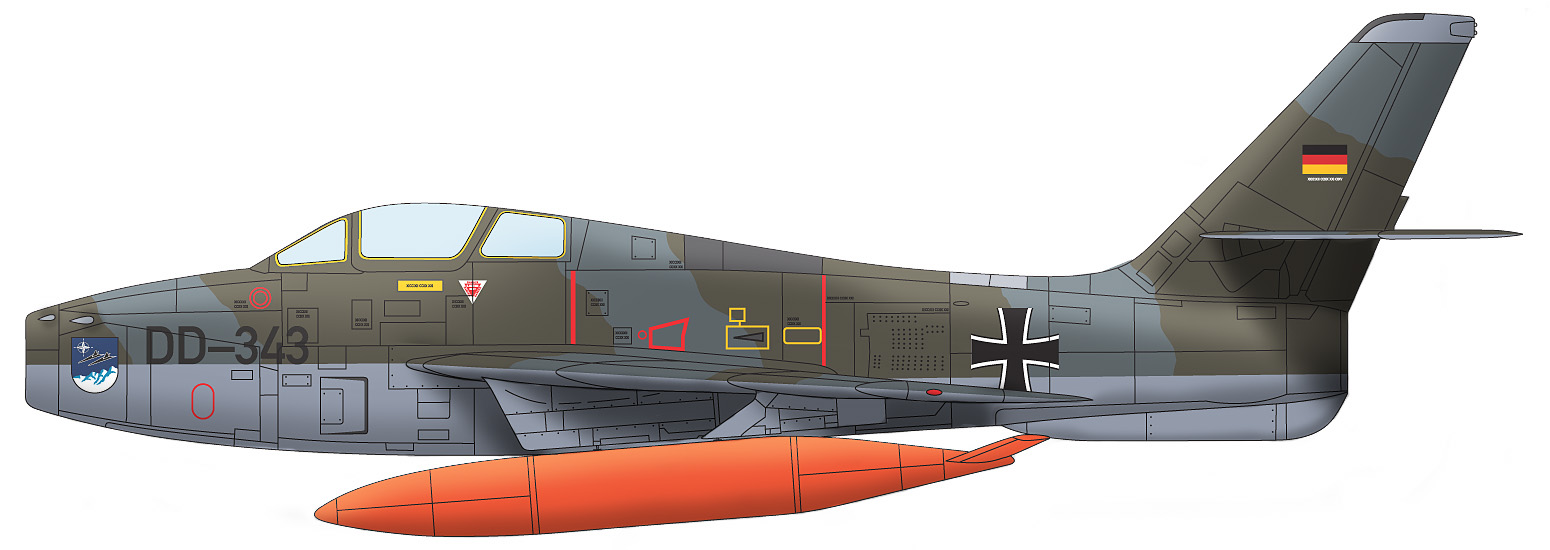
A German F84-F like the one Higgins flew on the fateful day

Higgins was asked to take over a maintenance flight as stand-in for another pilot on duty. The German F-84F of Waffenschule der Luftwaffe 30 with registration BA-102 had logged only 103 flight hours and had been taken over by the Luftwaffe on November 13, 1956, from the USAF. Shortly after takeoff at 1049, the engine caught fire. Higgins turned right for a short pattern, which crossed parts of the city, not higher than 300 meters. Although he was advised to eject, he steered his descending jet downwind and into the right base of the pattern, steering it away from the town. He ejected at about 80 meters over the forest near Rothschwaige – 2 minutes and 18 seconds after leaving the runway - but due to the low-level eject, he died close to the crash site. The crash was the first accident with a German F-84F. The engine failure was caused by broken turbine blades in the fourth stage high-pressure compressor.

== Posthumous honors ==
Ten days after the accident, Richard-Higgins-Straße in Fürstenfeldbruck was named after Higgins. He was promoted to major by the USAF.

On April 5, 2000 Gebäude 227 (building 227) at Fürstenfeldbruck Air Base was named Captain Higgins Gebäude. His widow Elisabeth and daughter Blair attended the ceremony 43 years after his death.

At Christmas 2002, an elementary school in Fürstenfeldbruck changed its name to "Richard-Higgins-Volksschule". The new name was approved by the Bavarian State Minister for Education and Cultural Affairs Monika Hohlmeier.

Richard W. Higgins is listed by the German Air Force as one of its four role models, along with Ludger Hölker, Michael Giermeier and Jürgen Schumann. He is the only non-German role model listed.
