= Gabriele von Lutzau =

German sculptor

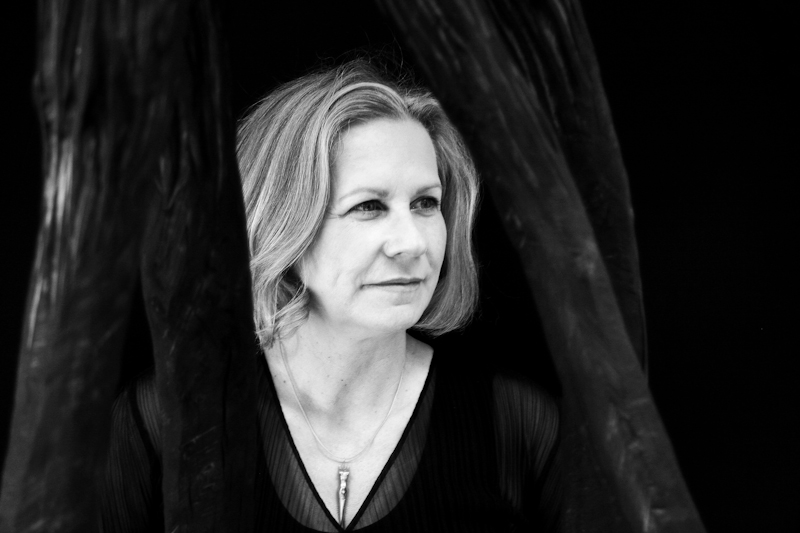
- Gabriele von Lutzau, 2010
- Born: Gabriele Dillmann; 15 August 1954 (age 71); Wolfsburg, West Germany
- Occupation: Sculptor
- Known for: Her role in a notorious hijacking

Gabriele von Lutzau (née Dillmann; born 15 August 1954) is a German heroine and sculptor. She is remembered as the "Angel of Mogadishu" for her courageous actions as a stewardess during a notorious aircraft hijacking. She is also noted for her abstract beechwood sculptures. Through marriage, she became a member of the Russian-German Lutzau family, who were ennobled in Imperial Russia.

== Mogadishu hijacking ==
Gabriele Dillmann worked as a flight attendant for Lufthansa. In 1977, she was serving on Lufthansa Flight 181 when it was hijacked by terrorists from the Popular Front for the Liberation of Palestine (PFLP). During the ensuing protracted captivity, she was a pillar of support and hope for the other hostages and was lionized by the German press. She was awarded the Order of Merit of the Federal Republic of Germany for her role in the affair. She later married her fiancé, Lufthansa pilot Rüdiger von Lutzau, who had piloted the plane carrying the German GSG 9 commandos for the rescue mission. They had two children and were married for 44 years until his death on 2 August 2021.

Two German-language films of the hijacking were made: Death Game (1997), in which she was played by Susanne Schäfer, and Mogadischu (2008), in which Nadja Uhl plays her.

Peter H. Jamin has made a short film Der Engel von Mogadischu (The Angel of Mogadishu) about Lutzau, covering both her role in the hijacking and her later life as an artist.

== Artistic career ==
From 1984 to 1995, Lutzau studied art under Walther Piesch at the art school of the University of Strasbourg.

Her works are mainly "guardian figures" carved in wood, predominantly beechwood, but also from black locust. Her sculpting tools include the chainsaw and flamethrower. She describes her work as "sentinels, wings, and life signs" crafted from "discarded wood - unwanted, sometimes grown under hard conditions - gnarled and twisted and finally felled." Although her original work is always in wood,she often has sculptures cast into bronze or steel. For her "guardians" and "life signs", she also uses thuja trees, often called the "tree of life", due to their frequent planting on graves.

Lutzau has exhibited at the ALP Galleries in New York City (a gallery dedicated to German artists), in Shanghai (Shanghai Spring Art Salon 2003), numerous galleries and shows in Germany.

Since 11 September 2001, Lutzau has coloured her guardian figures black (they had previously been blue).

Lutzau is a member of the German Federal Association of Visual Artists (BBK). In 1997 she was received the Aisch Art Prize of the Art Association of Höchstadt, She also served as a jury member for the Federal Office for Building and Regional Planning in Berlin in 2002 and for the BBK in Frankfurt in 2003. She now lives and works in Michelstadt in the Odenwald.
