= TAF Linhas Aéreas =

Brazilian airline

IATA	ICAO	Call sign
R9	TSD	TAFI
- Founded: 1957 as an air taxi company, 1995 as an airline
- Ceased operations: 2009
- Hubs: Fortaleza International Airport
- Fleet size: 0
- Headquarters: Fortaleza, Brazil
- Key people: Joaquim Irineu de Araújo Neto & Ariston Filho
- Website: www.tafaviacao.com.br

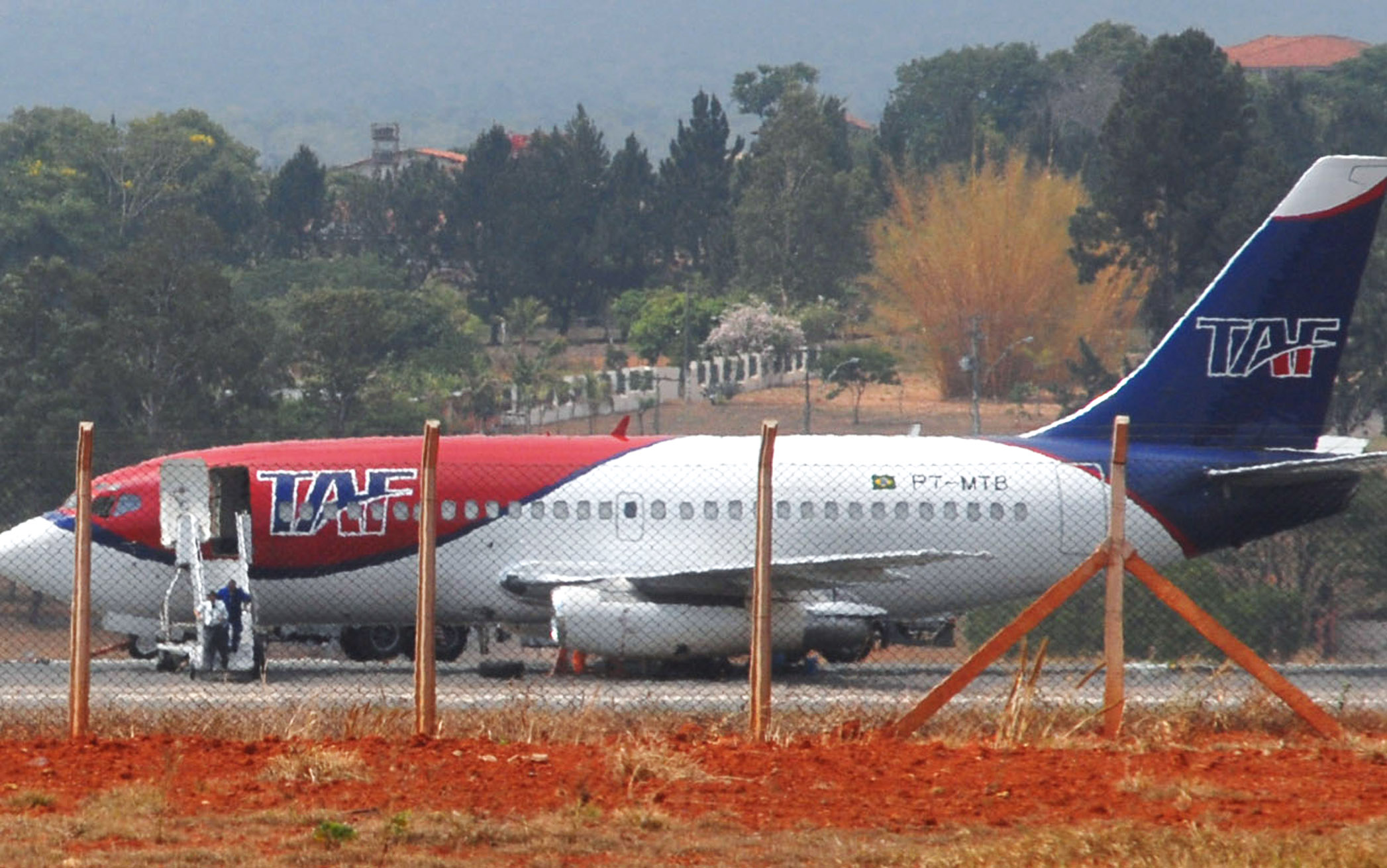
The former Lufthansa Landshut Boeing 737-200 PT-MTB

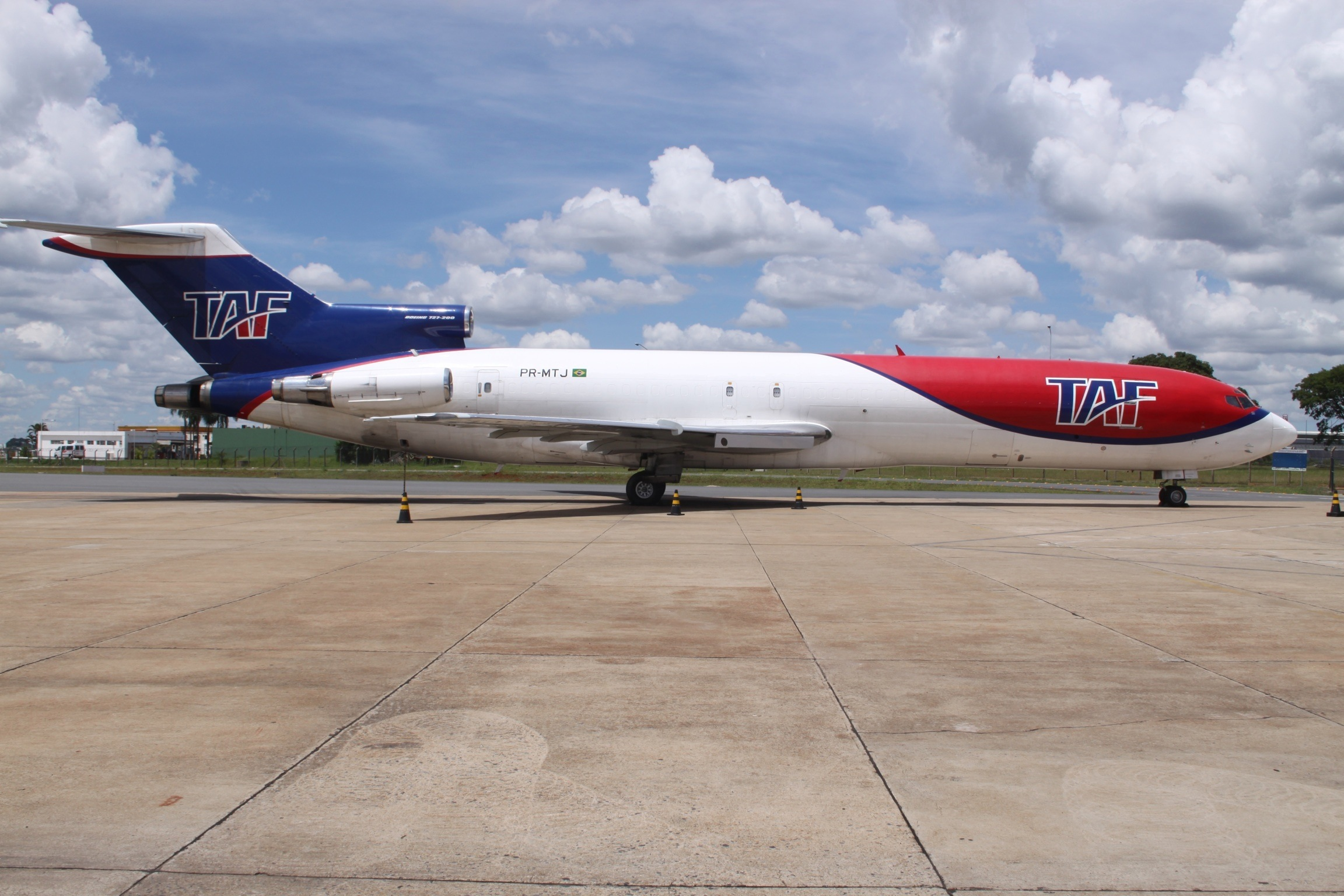
Boeing 727-200 in TAF colors

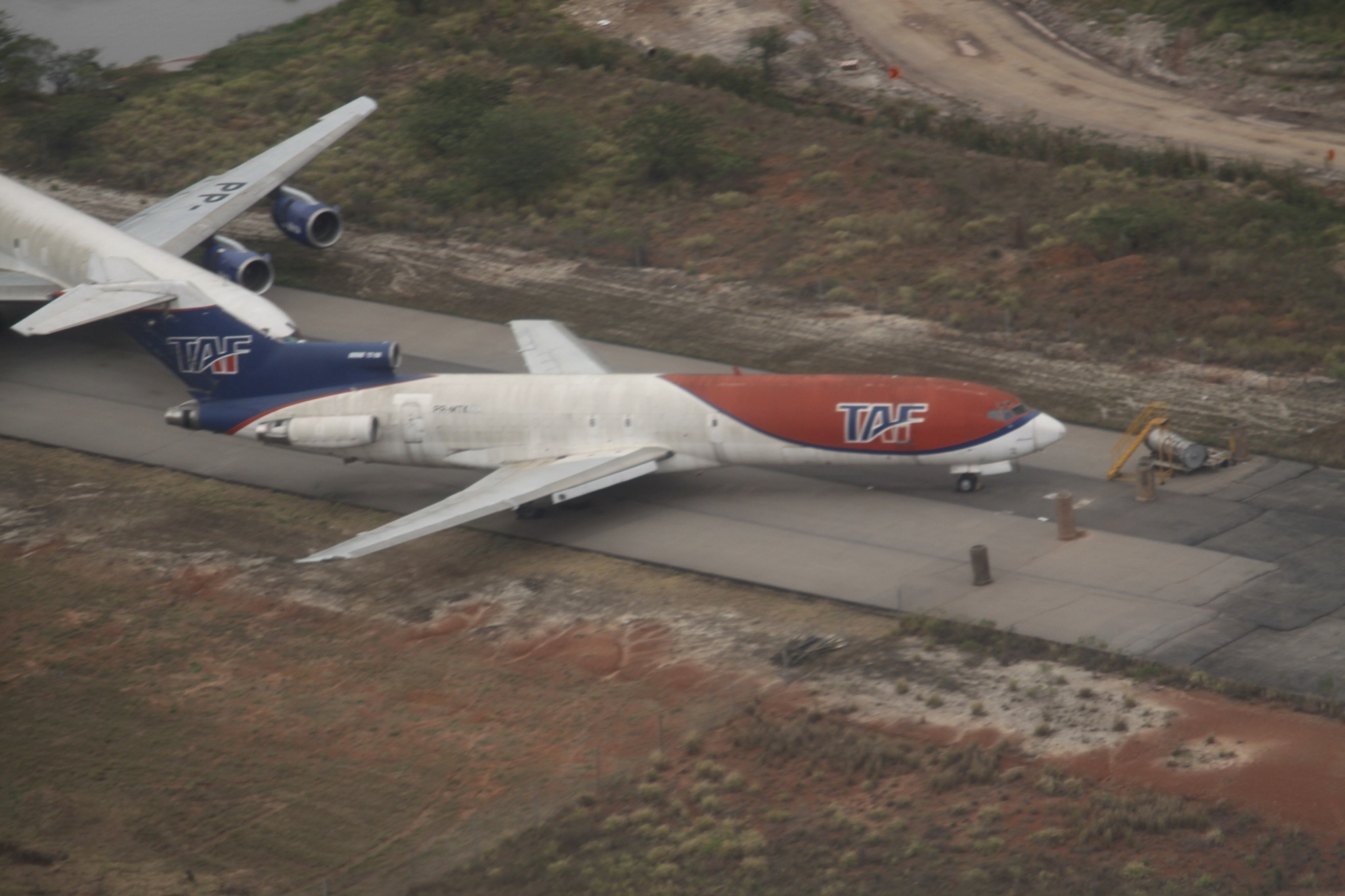
Boeing 727-200 in TAF colors abandoned at GRU

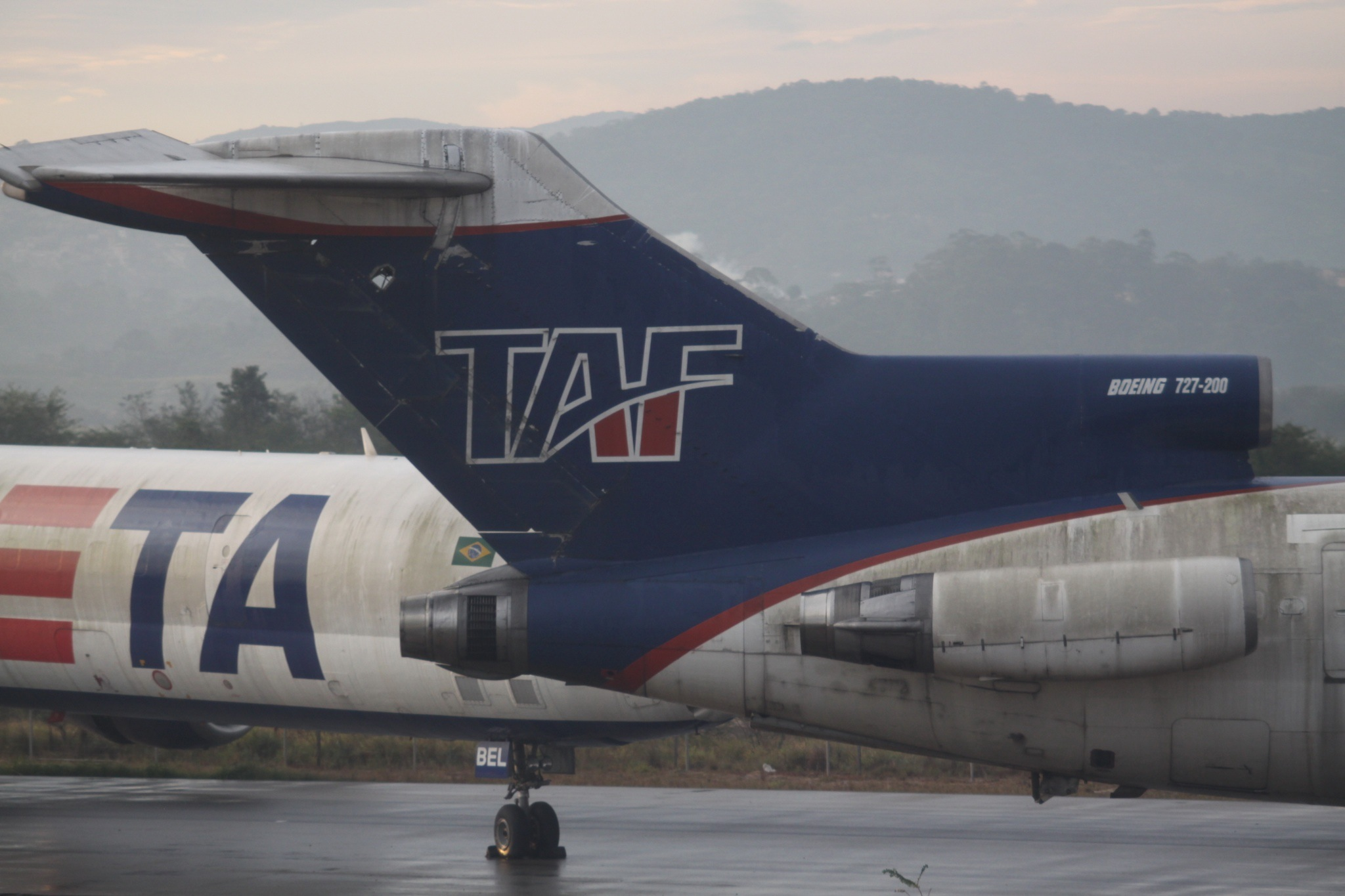
Boeing 727-200 in TAF colors abandoned at GRU

TAF Linhas Aéreas was an airline based in Fortaleza, Brazil. It operated regional passenger and cargo services. Today, the owner continues services with a TAF Taxi Aéreo or TAF Air Taxi, using Cessna 208 Caravans for sporadic flights in the interior of northeast Brazil.

== History ==
The airline was established and started operations as an air taxi company (Táxi Aéreo Fortaleza) in 1957 by pilot João Ariston Pessoa de Araújo, who was born in Cascavel.

In 1992, TAF started operating night cargo flights for the Brazilian Postal Service between the cities of Recife, Fortaleza, João Pessoa, Natal, Juazeiro do Norte and Sobral, with a fleet of two Cessna 208 Caravan and two Embraer EMB 110 Bandeirante.

On 1 March 1995, it was officially proclaimed a regular airline, and on 17 March 1996 its name became TAF Linhas Aéreas S.A.

In 1998, the company started operating flights on the route Juazeiro do Norte – Sobral – Iguatu. In 1999, competition from Nordeste and Varig forced it to cancel the routes it had by then established to Picos, Recife and Teresina. On 20 June 2000, TAF received a Boeing 737-248C, a version convertible between passenger and cargo configurations, joining a fleet that then consisted of 5 Cessna 208 and 4 Embraer 110.

In 2001, it suspended its passenger flights for some time, concentrating its efforts again on postal cargo flights. Two of its Embraer 110 were then put out of service.

In 2002, it received its second Boeing 737-200 to operate cargo flights on the Recife – Natal – São Luís – Teresina – Brasília – Rio de Janeiro route. This was the very same aircraft that had been in the dramatic "Landshut hijacking" episode while flying for Lufthansa in 1977. Also in 2002, one Cessna 208 left the fleet. In 2003, TAF received another cargo Boeing 737-200 and started flying to Goiânia and São Paulo.

In 2004, it received a Boeing 727-228 to operate further cargo flights. In the following year, it resumed regular passenger flights and started its first international route, to Cayenne, French Guiana, via Belém and Macapá.

In September 2007, it started the weekend route Recife – Fortaleza – Belém – Manaus – Aruba, on a Boeing 737-200.

In September 2008, TAF stopped operating scheduled domestic passenger flights and in April 2009, international passenger flights. It then concentrated its efforts again on cargo and postal services.

On 15 June 2010, the National Civil Aviation Agency of Brazil suspended the operational license of TAF and the airline was grounded. Finally, on 7 February 2013 its license was revoked.

In 2010, only Táxi Aéreo Fortaleza continued to operate with its air taxi service. Today the company operates charter flights with small aircraft, including three helicopters, under contracts of the Civil House of the State Government of Ceará, Unimed Fortaleza and Legislative Assembly.

== Destinations ==
TAF flew its Fortaleza - Belém - Macapá - Cayenne route until April 2009.

== Fleet ==
It consisted of the following aircraft among several charter executive aircraft and helicopters:

TAF Linhas Aéreas fleet
Aircraft	Total
Boeing 727-200	5
Boeing 737-200	5
Cessna 208A Caravan	3
Cessna 208B Caravan	1
EMB-110 Bandeirante	2

== See also ==
- List of defunct airlines of Brazil
