= Souhaila Andrawes =

Palestinian member of the PFLP

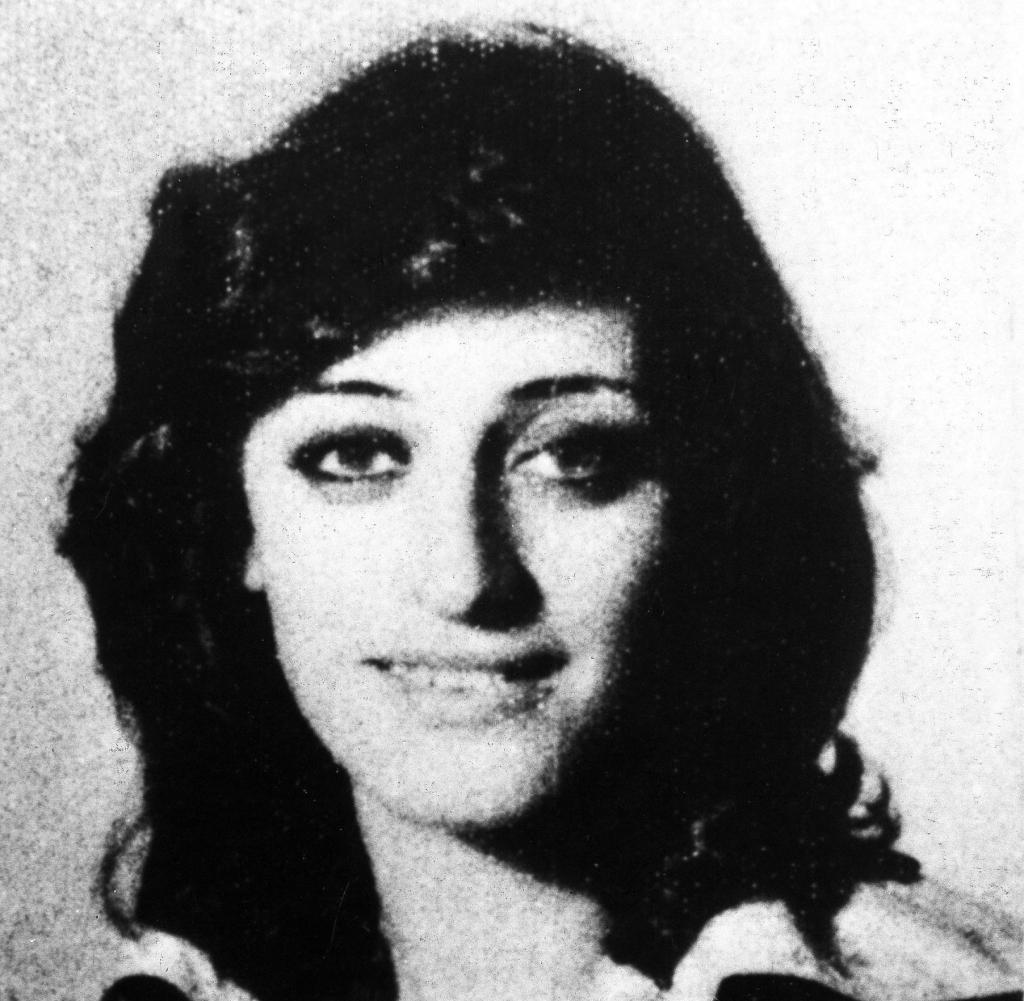
- Souhaila Andrawes's passport photo, ca. 1977
- Born: March 28, 1953 (age 73); Beirut, Lebanon

Souhaila Sami Andrawes Sayeh (Arabic: سهيلة أندراوس born 28 March 1953 in Beirut) is a militant and Lebanese member of the Popular Front for the Liberation of Palestine (PFLP).

== Early life and education ==
Souhaila Andrawes was born to Palestinian parents who were forced to leave their hometown of Haifa after the first Arab-Israeli War. She grew up in Beirut and was raised in the Christian faith. She graduated from a girls' school run by French nuns. In 1965, she moved with her parents to Kuwait, where she briefly attended a Muslim school, but left. Her original goal of becoming a nun herself would never have been possible in predominantly Muslim Kuwait, so she wanted to move to Jerusalem. However, the outbreak of the Six-Day War in 1967 thwarted her plans. Although Andrawes graduated as a top student of her class, she was denied a place at university because she had neither Kuwaiti citizenship nor the necessary connections. She then studied English language and literature in Lebanon.

== Lufthansa Flight 181 hijacking ==
In 1977, she participated in the hijacking of Lufthansa Flight 181 and the murder of pilot Jürgen Schumann. Andrawes was the only one of the four hijackers to survive the GSG 9 storming of the plane in Mogadishu. During the rescue operation, she was shot in the legs and lungs.

Andrawes was sentenced to twenty years imprisonment in Somalia, but was released a year later due to health-related issues, after which she moved to Beirut. In 1991, she moved to Oslo with her husband, Palestinian academic and human rights activist Ahmad Abu Matar, and her daughter until she was tracked down by Norwegian Police Security Service (PST) in 1994 and handed over to Germany in 1995. The arrest was followed by a strong debate on how to deal with foreign terrorists. She was sentenced to 12 years on terrorism charges and was released after three years due to poor health. She was the first woman to be sentenced twice for such a crime. Andrawes has since resided in Oslo, Norway with her husband and their daughter.
