= Ahmad Abu Matar =

Palestinian academic and writer

- Born: 1944; Beersheba, Palestine
- Died: 2016 (aged 71–72)
- Citizenship: Palestinian
- Occupations: Academic, writer, author
- Spouse: Souhaila Andrawes
- Children: 1

Academic background
- Education: Alexandria University

Academic work
- Discipline: literature
- Sub-discipline: Palestinian literature

Ahmad Abu Matar (1944–2016) was a Palestinian academic, researcher, literary critic, political analyst and writer who often wrote on human rights issues.

== Early life and education ==
Ahmad Abu Matar was born in Beersheba in 1944. He was expelled with his family to the Rafah refugee camp in the Gaza Strip in 1948.

He holds a PhD in Literature from the Department of Arabic Language at Alexandria University in 1979. His thesis was on Palestinian literature from 1950 to 1975, and was supervised by Professor Dr. Muhammad Zaki Al-Ashmawy.

== Biography ==
Al Jazeera hosted Ahmad Abu Matar on several of its programs, most notably in "The Opposite Direction," in which he expressed views that strongly criticized dictatorial regimes and conservative trends in Arab societies. Abu Matar resided in Oslo, where he obtained Norwegian citizenship and spent most of his time devoted to studies and research.

== Bibliography ==
- Studies in Palestinian Literature, Al-Tali’ah House, Kuwait, 1978.
- Arar, The Unaffiliated Poet, two editions: Aqlam Al-Sahwa Publications, Alexandria 1978, and Sabra House for Studies and Publishing, Damascus 1986.
- Illegal Variations, Short Stories, two editions: Kalam Al-Sahwa Publications, Alexandria, 1978, and Sabra Studies and Publishing House, Damascus, 1986.
- The Novel in Palestinian Literature, two editions: Iraqi Ministry of Information, 1980, and Arab Organization for Studies and Publishing, Beirut, 1981.
- Beirut, Self-Consciousness 1982 (documenting the siege of Beirut for 88 days), General Secretariat of the Union of Palestinian Writers, Damascus, 1983.
- The Novel and War (Critical Literary Studies), Arab Organization for Studies and Publishing, Beirut, 1996.
- Egyptian Culture in the Time of Normalization (an intellectual study), General Secretariat of the Arab Writers Union, Amman, 1996.
- Fall of a Dictator (documenting the fall of Saddam Hussein's regime), Dar al-Ansar al-Islamiyya, Beirut, 2003.
- Palestinians in Saddam's Prisons (documenting the testimonies of eight Palestinian prisoners in Iraqi prisons by name and photo), Dar al-Ansar al-Islamiyya, Beirut, 2004
- Kuwaiti Essays (a collection of essays on the author's experience in Kuwait and the period of the occupation of Kuwait by Saddam Hussein's army), Dar al-Ansar al-Islamiyya, Beirut, 2005
- Islam and Violence (Intellectual Studies), co-authored with Dr. Khalis Chalabi and Dr. Zuhair Al-Makh, Dar Al-Karmel-Amman, two editions: 2005 and 2006.
- The Events of September 11 as Seen by Arab writers and thinkers, a collection of studies by ten Arab writers on these events, edited and presented by Dar al-Karmel, Amman, 2007.
- Hezbollah, The Other Face, two editions: Dar al-Karmel, Jordan, 2009; Al-Amal Company, Cairo, 2010. - The Iranian Danger, Illusion or Reality. The Egyptian House for Publishing and Distribution, Cairo, 2010
