= Barry Davies (British Army soldier) =

British soldier (1944–2016)

Barry Davies BEM
- Born: 22 November 1944; Wem, Shropshire, UK
- Died: 4 August 2016 (aged 71) Valencia, Spain
- Branch: British Army
- Service years: 1962–1985

Barry Davies, BEM (22 November 1944 – 18 April 2016) was a British Army infantry soldier who served with the Welsh Guards and the Special Air Service regiments. He was later a published author, and worked in television production.

== Early life ==
Davies was born on 22 November 1944 during World War II, in Wem, in the county of Shropshire, where his father was a farmer.

== Military career ==
In 1962 at the age of 18 he enlisted with the British Army's Welsh Guards, which he served with for 4 years. At the age of 22 he applied to join the Special Air Service Regiment, and having passed its selection course was transferred into it, and went on to have an extensive career with its squadrons for almost 20 years around the world, including in service in Northern Ireland during Operation Banner, Oman, Malaya, Africa and Latin America.

In 1977 he took part in an anti-terrorist operation to rescue 91 passengers of Lufthansa Flight 181 after the aeroplane had been hijacked at Mogadishu airport. Davies had originally been sent to the scene to act as an observer and advisor, but once there ended up taking part in the armed assault on the plane to free the hostages, for which he was awarded the British Empire Medal.

== Post-military career ==
Davies retired from the British Army in 1985, and found employment as a consultant and product development and sales executive with the Cardiff based B.C.B. International, Ltd., a military, police and survival equipment manufacturer.

He became a prolific author, publishing a number of books on the Special Air Service Regiment and survival guides, including Fire Magic: Hijack to Mogadishu (1994), S.A.S. Rescue (1997), Heroes of the S.A.S. (2000), S.A.S.: The Illustrated History (1996), Operation Royal Blood (2001), S.A.S.: Shadow warriors of the 21st Century (2002), The Complete History of the S.A.S. (2011).

Davies was also employed as an advisor/presenter, and occasionally dramatically acted in British television productions based upon Special Forces' soldiering in the 1990s and early 2000s, including the documentary The Widow, the Terrorist & the S.A.S. (1996), S.A.S. Survival Guide: Escape, Evasion & Survival (1999), SAS: Are You Tough Enough? (2002–04), and 'Spymaster' (2004).

== Personal life ==
Davies married four times and was the father of two children, a son and daughter from his second marriage.

== Death ==
Davies died on 18 April 2016 from a heart attack in Valencia in Spain, where he had resided since the late 1990s.

== Publications ==
- Survival is a Dying Art (1987)
- Fire Magic: Hijack at Mogadishu (1994)

"Shadow of the Dove" (1995)

- S.A.S. Escape, Evasion & Survival Guide (1996)
- S.A.S. - The Illustrated History (1996)
- S.A.S. Rescue (1997)
- The Complete Encyclopedia of the S.A.S. (1998)
- Hillwalker's Survival Guide (1999)
- Joining the S.A.S.: How to get in and what it's like (1999)
- S.A.S. Self-Defence (1999)
- The S.A.S. Encyclopedia of Survival (1999)
- S.A.S. Fitness (2000)
- Operation Royal Blood (2001) (fictional novel)
- S.A.S. Active Library: Self Defence (2001)
- S.A.S. Active Library: Fitness Training (2001)
- S.A.S. Active Library: Emergency Medic (2001)
- S.A.S. Active Library: Mountain Skills (2001)
- S.A.S. Desert Survival (2001)
- The Encyclopedia of Outdoor Survival (2002)
- S.A.S.: Shadow Warriors of the 21st Century (2002)
- Spycraft Manual: Insider's Guide to Espionage Techniques (2005)
- Streetwise Spycraft (2007)
- Terrorism (2010)
- Complete S.A.S. Survival Manual (2011)
- S.A.S. Self-Defence Handbook (2011)
- The Complete History of the SAS (2011), co-authored with N. McCrery
- Modern Survival: How to cope when everything falls apart (2012)
- S.A.S. Jungle Survival (2013)
- S.A.S. Desert Survival (2013)
- The S.A.S. Guide to Arctic & Mountain Survival (2013)
- Soldier of Fortune: A Guide on how to become a Mercenary (2013)
- Soldier of Fortune: How to disappear and never be found (2013)
- S.A.S Tracking Handbook (2014)
- S.A.S. Combat Handbook (2015)
- Build a drone: A step-by-step guide (2016)
- Heroes of the S.A.S. (2017) (pub. posthumously)
- S.A.S. Rescue Missions, 1948-1995 (2019) (pub. posthumously)
