= Roland Suso Richter =

German film director and producer

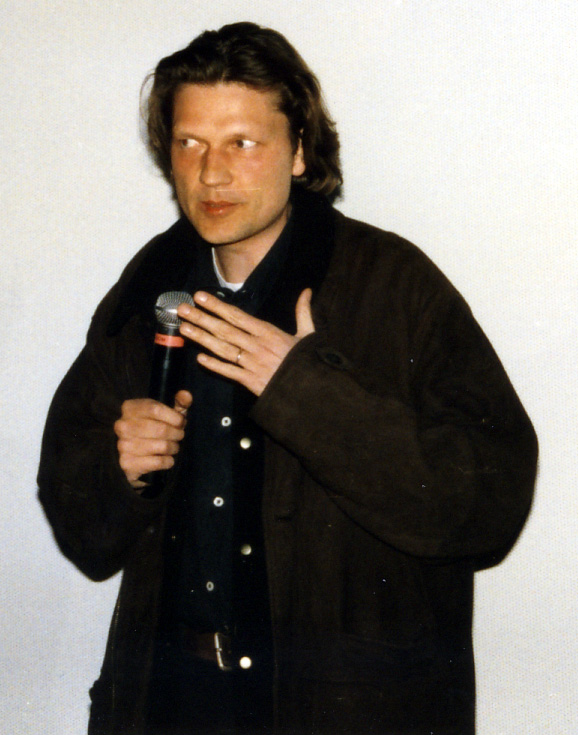
- Richter at a film premiere in 1997
- Born: Roland Suso Richter; January 7, 1961 (age 65); Marburg, West Germany
- Occupations: Film director, producer, screenwriter
- Years active: 1983 – present

Roland Suso Richter (born January 7, 1961, in Marburg) is a German film director and producer.

== Biography ==
Richter was born in Marburg and lived there until 1980, when he graduated (Abitur) from the local Elisabethschule. Wanting to pursue a film career, he worked as an intern for video productions and as an actor on stage. In 1982, he appeared as an extra in Rainer Werner Fassbinder's Veronika Voss.

A year later, he and actor Frank Röth produced their first film, Kolp, which was released in 1985. Many TV films followed until 14 Days to Life was released in 1997, earning Richter favorable reviews.

The 1999 film After the Truth, a fictional account of an 80-year-old Josef Mengele's trial before a German court, did not receive funding from the German film foundation due to its controversial theme. It was financed privately by lead actor Götz George and others, and received a number of awards at film festivals. He also directed Der Tunnel, a made-for-television movie loosely based on true events in Berlin following the closing of the East German border in August 1961 and the subsequent construction of the Berlin Wall.

In 2003, Richter gave his English-language directing debut with the psychological thriller The I Inside, starring Ryan Phillippe and Sarah Polley, which was compared to Memento and The Butterfly Effect.

Another of Richter's projects was the television movie Mogadischu, an account of the hijacking of Lufthansa Flight 181 in 1977 and its subsequent storming by the GSG 9 counter-terrorism unit.

== Filmography ==
- 1984: Kolp
- 1990: Alles Paletti (TV series)
- 1992: Frohes Fest, Lucie! (TV film)
- 1992: Freunde fürs Leben (TV series)
- 1994: Sven's Secret (TV film)
- 1994: Alles außer Mord: Der Name der Nelke (TV series episode)
- 1994: Das Phantom – Die Jagd nach Dagobert (TV film)
- 1994: Polizeiruf 110: Samstags, wenn Krieg ist (TV series episode)
- 1995: Risiko Null – Der Tod steht auf dem Speiseplan (TV film)
- 1997: Buddies (TV film)
- 1997: 14 Days to Life
- 1998: The Bubi Scholz Story (TV film)
- 1999: Sara Amerika
- 1999: After the Truth
- 2000: A Handful of Grass
- 2001: The Tunnel (TV film)
- 2003: The I Inside
- 2004: Sterne leuchten auch am Tag (TV film)
- 2005: Under the Dark Sun of Africa (TV film)
- 2006: Dresden (TV film)
- 2007: The Miracle of Berlin (TV film)
- 2007: Annas Alptraum kurz nach 6 (TV film)
- 2008: Mogadischu (TV film)
- 2010: The Frontier (TV film)
- 2011: Jungle Child
- 2014: Public Enemies (TV film)
- 2014: Ein todsicherer Plan (TV film)
- 2014: Der Weg nach San José (TV film)
- 2015: Grzimek (TV film)
- 2016: Marthe's Secret (TV film)
