= Jürgen Schumann =

German pilot who captained Lufthansa Flight 181

- Born: 29 April 1940; Colditz, Germany
- Died: 16 October 1977 (aged 37); Aden, South Yemen
- Cause of death: Murdered by Zohair Yousif Akache, the leader of the hijackers
- Monuments: Monument in Babenhausen, Germany
- Known for: Flight Captain of Lufthansa Flight 181
- Aviation career
- Famous flights: Lufthansa Flight 181 (1977)

Jürgen Schumann (29 April 1940 – 16 October 1977) was a German commercial airline pilot and former German Air Force officer. He served as the flight captain of the Lufthansa plane Landshut during its hijacking on 13 October 1977. The hijacking was led by Zohair Yousif Akache, also known as Captain Mahmoud, a militant from the Popular Front for the Liberation of Palestine (PFLP). Schumann was murdered by Akache at Aden International Airport on the fourth day of the hijacking.

== Life ==
In 1960, Schumann joined the Air Force of the Bundeswehr and began his flying career at Büchel Air Base in West Germany. In 1965, he was assigned to the Tactical Air Force Wing TaktLwG 33, flying the Lockheed F-104 Starfighter. After retiring as a Hauptmann (Officer) in 1968, he became a commercial airline pilot for Lufthansa. Schumann was the Captain of the Lufthansa plane Landshut (Lufthansa Flight 181) when it was hijacked by four militants of the Popular Front for the Liberation of Palestine (PFLP) on 13 October 1977 while en route from Palma de Mallorca, Spain, to Frankfurt, West Germany.

On 14 October, during a forced stop in Dubai, Schumann was able to share information with the authorities about the number of hijackers on board the plane. Upon making a forced landing on 16 October at Aden International Airport (in South Yemen at the time) on a sand strip near the runway (as the government had blocked all runways to prevent the hijacked plane from landing and the plane did not have enough fuel to reach another destination), Schumann left with permission from Akache, to check the aircraft's airworthiness, including the engines and landing gear. He also used the opportunity to talk to Yemeni airport authorities about complying with the hijackers' demands and grounding the aircraft, but to no avail. His last words before re-entering the aircraft were "I am going back now. I am sure they will kill me".

Schumann subsequently boarded the plane. On board, Akache, in a fit of rage fueled by suspicions due to Schumann's prolonged absence, furiously forced him to kneel on the passenger cabin floor and, without giving him a chance to explain himself, fatally shot him in the head.

== Honours ==
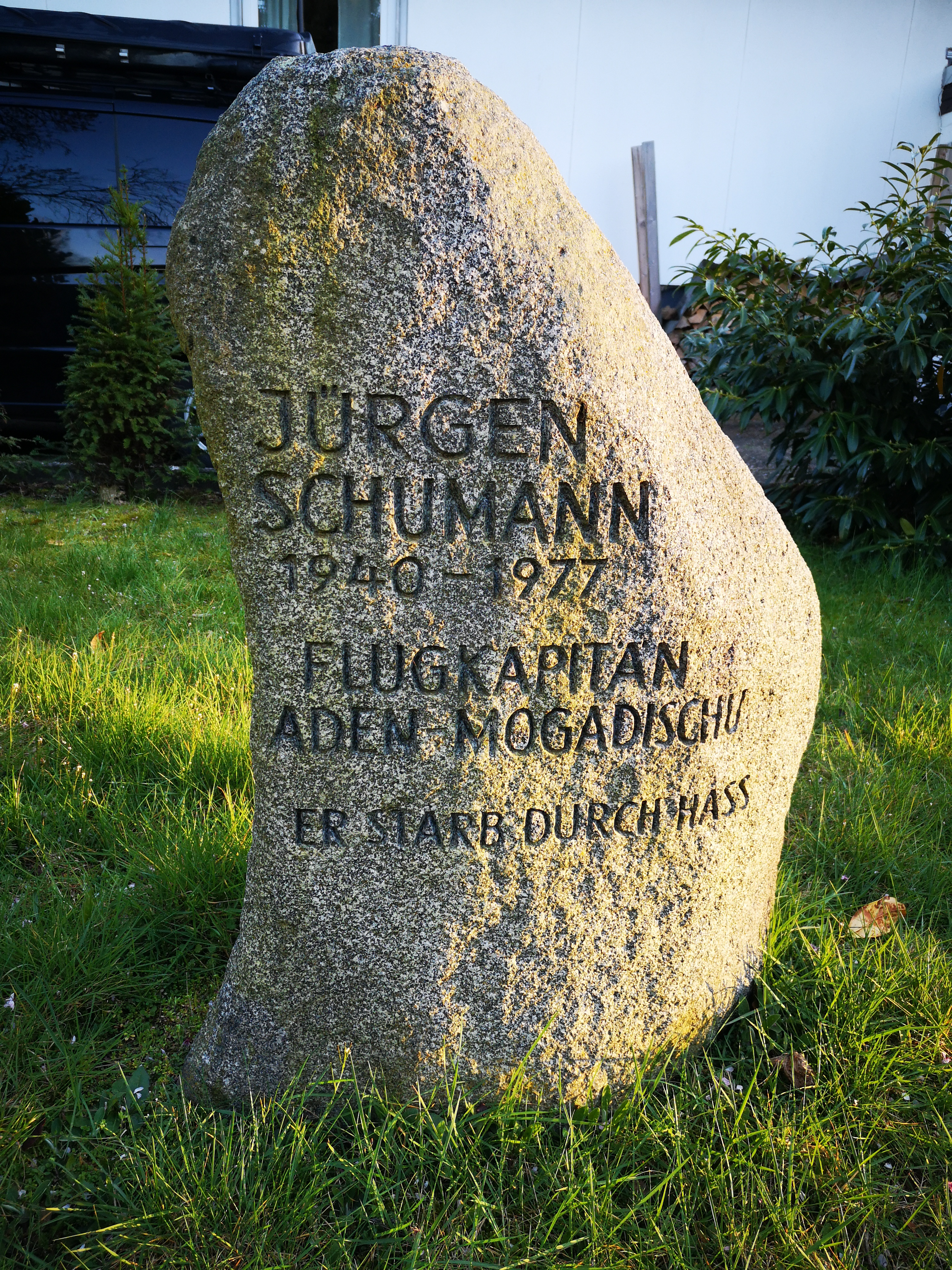
The memorial to Jürgen Schumann in Babenhausen, Germany

Schumann was posthumously awarded the German Federal Cross of Merit 1st class by West German Federal President Walter Scheel for his actions during the hijacking. The medal was carried on a cushion in front of the coffin at Schumann's funeral on 21 October 1977 by his co-pilot of the "Landshut", Jürgen Vietor. At this award ceremony, three exceptions to the rule were made: firstly, the honouree had not yet reached the normally required minimum age of 40 years; secondly, it was a first award, which normally does not exceed the Cross of Merit with Ribbon; and thirdly, it was awarded posthumously.

Schumann was survived by his wife and two sons. The building housing the Lufthansa Aviation Training Academy in Bremen was named in his honour, as was a street in the Bavarian city of Landshut, whose name the Lufthansa plane bore. He is buried in Babenhausen in Hesse, where a street was named after him and a memorial stone was erected. In Arnoldshain, in the Hochtaunuskreis district, a primary school was named after Schumann.

Mein Mann war kein Held. Als Flugkapitän hatte er die alleinige Verantwortung für seine Passagiere. In dieser Verantwortung hat er gehandelt. (In English: My husband was not a hero. As a flight captain, he had sole responsibility for his passengers. He acted within this responsibility.)

— Monika Schumann on 3 June 2021

Jürgen Schumann is listed by the German Air Force as one of four role models of bravery in its history, alongside German Air Force pilot Ludger Hölker, USAF pilot Richard W. Higgins, and German Air Force staff sergeant Michael Giermeier, known as the "Angel of Sarajevo" for his humanitarian engagement as part of the IFOR/SFOR deployment.

Schumann was depicted in two made-for-TV films about the events surrounding Lufthansa Flight 181: Death Game (1997), where he is portrayed by Matthias Freihof, and Mogadischu (2008), where he is portrayed by Thomas Kretschmann. The Jürgen Schumann Barracks of the Bundeswehr in Appen was renamed in his honour on 24 November 2021, following lengthy official procedures.

== See also ==
- German Autumn – a period marked by a series of terrorist attacks by the Red Army Faction (RAF) in West Germany during 1977, culminating in the hijacking of Lufthansa Flight 181.
