= Manfred Genditzki =

German man wrongly convicted of murder

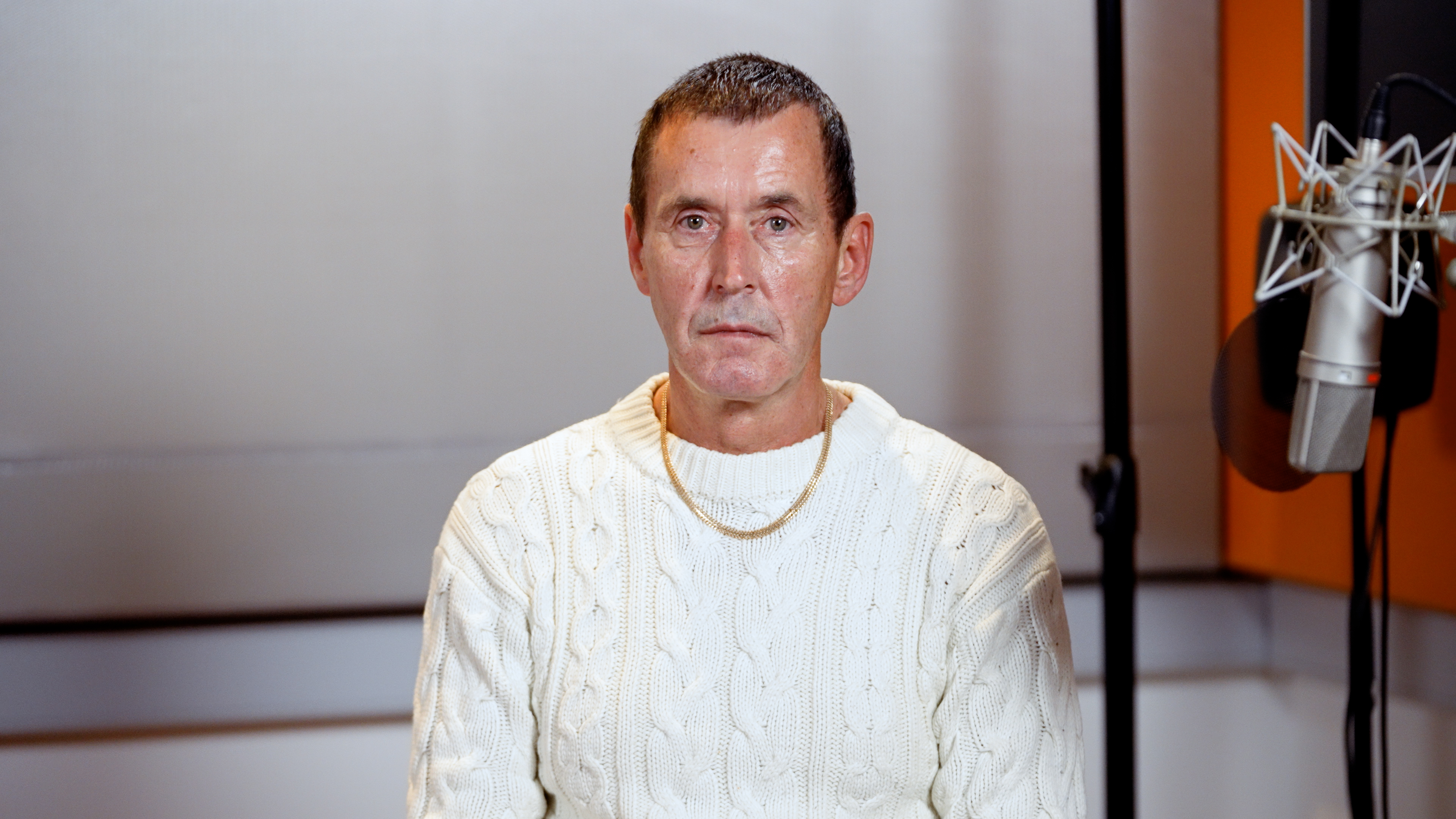
- Born: 28 May 1960 (age 66); Kalübbe, Bezirk Neubrandenburg, East Germany
- Known for: Wrongful imprisonment

Manfred Benno Genditzki (born 28 May 1960) is a German man who was sentenced on circumstantial evidence to life imprisonment for the murder of 87-year-old pensioner Lieselotte Kortüm from Rottach-Egern, Bavaria, Germany. After serving a thirteen-year prison sentence, Genditzki was released from prison in 2022, after a reinvestigation found evidence that Genditzki was not present during Kortüm's death, which was likely accidental due to other evidence. He was acquitted of the charges in a retrial in 2023.

== Early life ==
Genditzki was born 1960 in Kalübbe, a village of Breesen, Mecklenburg-Vorpommern. He underwent training as an agricultural technician and mechaniser. After German reunification, Genditzki moved to Bavaria. He is married and has three children, all born before his imprisonment.

== Death of Lieselotte Kortüm ==
Genditzki was the building manager of Kortüm's residence. Genditzki had promised Kortüm's husband, who died in March 2007, that he would take care of her, helping Kortüm shopping, preparing meals and doing the laundry. On 28 October 2008, Kortüm returned home from a hospital stay according to Genditzki's statements. He left at 3:00 pm to visit his mother who felt sick. Earlier, he had given the home nursing service a call reporting Kortüm had returned from the hospital. As happened every day, at 6:30 pm, a nurse arrived at Kortüm's apartment and found her body fully clothed in the bathtub. The cause of death was drowning. At first, an unfortunate, accidental fall was assumed to be the cause of death. The body was cremated the following day. One month later the autopsy report was amended. The death was judged a homicide and became known as the "Bathtub Murder".

== Trial for murder ==
Hematomas with bleeding and an undamaged scalp at the back head were recognized in the autopsy. The hematomas were not unusual since the deceased medicated herself with an anticoagulant. In this first autopsy report, the death was caused by drowning after an unfortunate fall into the bathtub.

The prosecutor was disturbed by Genditzki's willingness to talk. He had immediately arrived with alibis like receipts from the day of Kortüm's death. The prosecutor began an investigation following a new autopsy report. He assumed Genditzki had killed the elderly woman to hide the fact he had embezzled money from her apartment during her hospital stay. Support for this theory was indicated when, on the day on Kortüm went into the hospital, Genditzki returned 8,000 euros to a friend. In February 2009 Genditzki was taken into custody.

The indictment accused Genditzki of embezzling Kortüm on 28 October 2008. It turned out, in the course of the trial, that none of Kortüm's money was missing, and Genditzki's repayment came from legal sources. The accusation was based on the assumption that the defendant had not committed embezzlement, but there had been a dispute during which he beat the woman, and the assumption was the murder occurred to coverup the previous injuries. On 12 May 2010, the Munich Second Regional Court sentenced Genditzki for murder. Under German law the sentence was for life imprisonment.

On 12 January 2011, the German Federal Court of Justice annulled the court order due to a procedural error and referred the case back to another chamber of the regional court. The exchange of the reference act in case of concealed murder would be a change of the legal point of view, which the court should have pointed out according to § 265 StPO in the main hearing.

On 17 January 2012 the new trial resulted in another life sentence for murder. The Chamber considered it proven that Genditzki and Kortüm had got into a dispute during which Genditzki either struck the woman on the head, or hit her so that she fell against a hard object sustaining the two bruises on her head. In a panic and with the thought "I'll get help", Genditzki dialed the number of the family doctor twice in quick succession but immediately hung up. Fearing he would be indicted, he let water run in the bathtub and drowned Kortüm by pressing her under water for several minutes. The appeal against this was rejected as unfounded, since the review of the judgment had not revealed any legal error to the disadvantage of the accused (§ 349 Paragraph 2 StPO).

== Doubts about judgement ==
Trial observers and media representatives remained in doubt about Genditzki's guilt. Observers firmly convinced he would be acquitted.

The defense assumed the deceased's death was an accident while she was soaking dirty laundry in the bathtub after returning from the hospital, She fell into the tub due to faintness. A psychological report points out Genditzki is a peaceful person. He explained the call to the family's doctor was to advise them Kortüm had returned home from her clinic stay. He had hung up the phone because the doctor's office answering machine had picked up the call. No murder instruments were identified or found. The plastic bags containing laundry Kortüm had brought from her hospital stay were disposed or uncovered. No fingerprints or DNA were found on the body or in the bathroom. A friend pointed out that Ms. Kortüm had a quirk by soaking all kinds of laundry in the bathtub first before washing it. She would also sometimes abruptly faint and at one time she had to rescue her from the bathtub. The prosecution changed the motive from embezzlement (when that was disproven) to a dispute between Genditzki and Kortum (no evidence was shown that there was a dispute). An investigation of the thermodynamics of the bath water showed that her death occurred long after Genditzki had left the apartment. The judge concluded that Ms. Kortum did not use the bath tub for soaking but a smaller bowl - for which there was no evidence. His employer was told by the police on the day of Mr. Genditzki's arrest that he would go to prison for life, verbatim "Der kommt nicht mehr raus" ("He's never coming back out"), implying the police's bias.

Genditzki's defense lawyer Regina Rick had been preparing an application since 2015 for a trial de novo.

Several news described the procedure as a miscarriage of justice.

== The attempt to obtain another retrial from the Bavarian Government ==
In July 2018 during a press conference at the Bavarian state parliament Genditzki's Lawyer went to attempt to obtain a retrial of the case by presenting a computer simulation video to the chairman of the Legal Committee.

Manfred Genditzki was released from prison on 12. August 2022. On 26 April 2023, the new trial began at the Munich I Regional Court, which ended with an acquittal on 7 July 2023. The state treasury must compensate him for the wrongfully imposed prison sentence. Genditzki was awarded a daily compensation payment of 75 euro for a total of €370,000, as well as €450,000 for loss of earnings during his incarceration. Genditzki sued the state of Bavaria for an additional €750,000 in damages for his loss of employment. In December 2024, while the process was ongoing, state prosecution retroactively demanded a payment of €100,000 for board and lodging provided during his imprisonment as well as backpay of any money earned through prison work.

== Literature ==
- (German) Dagmar Schön, Mordurteil ohne Tat?, myops 30 (Mai 2017), ISSN 1865-2301, S. 21–32
