= Ulrich Wegener =

German police officer

- Born: 22 August 1929; Jüterbog, Weimar Republic
- Died: 28 December 2017 (aged 88); Windhagen, Germany
- Military career
- Allegiance: West Germany
- Branch: Bereitschaftspolizei (Readiness (Riot) Police); Bundesgrenzschutz (Federal Border Guard)
- Service years: 1952–1989 (State Police until 1958 and Federal Border Guard until 1989)
- Rank: Brigadier General
- Commands: Bundesgrenzschutz (Border Guard Command West); Grenzschutzgruppe 9 (GSG 9); Grenzschutzgruppe 2 (7th Company GSG 2 and 15th Company GSG 2)
- Conflicts: Operation Entebbe; Lufthansa Flight 181 (Operation Magic Fire)
- Awards: Commander's Cross of the Federal Cross of Merit

Ulrich Klaus Wegener (22 August 1929 – 28 December 2017) was a German police officer of the Federal Border Guard (holding the rank of Brigadier General and the official title of Commander of the Federal Border Guard, Border Guard Command West). He was also the commander and founding member of the federal counter-terrorism force GSG 9 (Grenzschutzgruppe 9).

== Early life ==
Wegener was born in Jüterbog, Province of Brandenburg, Weimar Germany. He was the son of an army officer and came from a family steeped in Prussian military tradition. During the Second World War, between the ages of 14 and 15, Wegener was briefly a compulsory member of the Hitler Youth and, living near Berlin, endured the relentless Allied air raids.

In 1949, Wegener's home state of Brandenburg fell within the borders of communist East Germany (German Democratic Republic), where he began his studies in economics. In the early 1950s, as a member of an anti-communist group, he distributed dissident leaflets against the Socialist Unity Party of Germany (SED) in the Soviet-occupied sector of East Berlin. He was subsequently arrested for "socially hostile activity" after the group was informed on, initially imprisoned in Potsdam and later in Brandenburg. He spent more than a year and a half in a GDR State Security (Stasi) prison, where they tried to break him before his release. In 1952, Wegener fled to West Berlin before taking entrance exams in West Germany (Federal Republic of Germany) for both an officer's career in a West German Landespolizei Readiness (Riot) Police Force (Bereitschaftspolizei) and the newly formed Federal Defence Forces (Bundeswehr).

== Career ==
Wegener's police career began in 1952 with the Readiness (Riot) Police (Bereitschaftspolizei) of the state police force of Baden-Württemberg, where he served as a police sergeant (Polizeiwachtmeister) on probation. Due to a lack of opportunities for advancement, Wegener applied for a career as an officer in the Bundeswehr and the Federal Border Guard (BGS, Bundesgrenzschutz). After passing the entrance exams, he decided to join the BGS in 1958. Following his attendance at officer school in Lübeck, he was promoted to lieutenant (Leutnant) in the BGS in 1959. He became the company commander of the 7th/GSG 2 (7th company of the Border Guard Group 2) and later the 15th/GSG 2 (15th company of the Border Guard Group 2) in Coburg, Bavaria. In 1969, he attended staff officer training (Stabsoffiziersausbildung) and held the rank of Oberleutnant (First Lieutenant). From 1970 to 1972, Wegener was the liaison officer for the BGS at the Federal Ministry of the Interior. In 1972, he was training at the NATO Defense College in Rome, Italy, before returning to Germany shortly before the 1972 Summer Olympic Games. Wegener was the first Federal Border Guard (Bundesgrenzschutz) officer to participate in this high-level training.

== Formation of GSG 9 following the Munich Olympic massacre ==
Wegener was the Federal Border Guard (BGS, Bundesgrenzschutz) liaison officer at the Federal Ministry of the Interior during the 1972 Summer Olympics in Munich. While serving as an adjutant to Federal Interior Minister Hans-Dietrich Genscher, he witnessed the failure of the regular Bavarian State Police in the face of an unprecedented threat from Palestinian terrorists during the hostage-taking of the Israeli Olympic team—a type of threat previously unknown in Germany. Even the presence of the Federal Border Guard (BGS) would not have changed the catastrophic outcome of the hostage-taking. Two weeks after the disaster, Genscher, in agreement with Wegener's suggestion, entrusted him on 26 September 1972 with the rapid formation of the specialized counter-terrorism tactical intervention unit, Border Guard Group 9 (GSG 9, Grenzschutzgruppe 9), appointing him as its commander.

The designation GSG 9 is derived from the structure of the Federal Border Guard (BGS, Bundesgrenzschutz), which, at the time of the unit's founding, consisted of four border guard commands with a total of eight border guard groups (GSG 1 to 7 and Sea). Since the GSG 9 was not integrated into any of the existing structures, it was designated Border Guard Group 9 (Grenzschutzgruppe 9, GSG 9).

In the early 1970s, counter-terrorism units were still a relatively unheard-of form of combating terrorism, with the only truly established groups at the time being Israel's Sayeret Matkal, which had some experience in counter-terrorism and hostage-rescue, and Britain's Special Air Service (SAS), albeit with experience primarily in guerrilla warfare. However, these were special military combat units rather than specialized counter-terrorism and hostage-rescue units. Counter-terrorism and tactical policing specifically were still relatively unheard-of methods, and no military in the world had a unit specialized in handling hostage crises. Since there were no specialized units in the modern sense—only special military combat units—GSG 9 became the first specialized counter-terrorism tactical intervention and hostage rescue unit. To this end, Wegener cooperated with both groups, assimilating many of their methods into the doctrine he would establish for the GSG 9. Following the Munich Olympic massacre, the British SAS also developed its own specialized counter-terrorism unit (codenamed Pagoda Team).

Wegener's short time with the British SAS is well documented, but his cooperation with the Israeli Sayeret Matkal (and alleged participation in the rescue of the Israeli hostages during Operation Entebbe in Uganda in 1976) is less publicized.

=== Interview with Bayerischer Rundfunk ===
In an interview in November 2000 with Holger Lösch from Bayerischer Rundfunk, Wegener was asked: "You are an intimate connoisseur of military history. Which role models inspired you when planning the GSG 9 unit? Was it Stirling, the forefather of the SAS, or the Brandenburgers?" Wegener replied: "Everyone played a certain role in it. I looked into the history of the German special forces in the army archives, I looked into the history of the Brandenburgers and the English with Stirling, the forerunners of the SAS. But none of it fit because the tasks were completely different. The Israelis were always my role model, and they were the ones who, despite this traumatic experience that they also went through, were immediately ready to help us."

"The task of dealing with terrorism was always at the forefront for me. Because the Israelis always had the most experience in fighting terrorism and had already solved several cases with their special forces, it was clear to me that we had to work together. It was clear to me that the situation and circumstances in Israel were completely different from those in Germany. We couldn't adopt a lot of things, but we adopted many tactical tricks from the Israelis, and also in leadership matters, I always leaned toward the Israelis. Specifically, an Israeli officer said to me at the time: "We adopted a lot from you, including from the Wehrmacht era.""

When asked about the rumors of his presence in Entebbe in 1976, Wegener replied: "There are some things I am not allowed to say yet because they have not been released. I can only say this much: I was in Entebbe in the interests of the Germans and Israelis, but also before the Israeli attack was carried out. We tried to gather information about the enemy, the terrorists, as well as about the possible supporters who were present in Uganda. We were very successful and were able to gather a great deal of information."

== Storming of hijacked Lufthansa Flight 181 in Mogadishu ==
Wegener was the GSG 9 commander during the liberation of the hostages taken by the Popular Front for the Liberation of Palestine on the Boeing 737 Landshut hijacking, operated by Lufthansa as flight 181, in Mogadishu, Somalia, on the night of October 17–18, 1977. Wegener directed and led the operation from the ground as his GSG 9 assault teams stormed the plane. Two terrorists were killed, one was fatally wounded, and the fourth was captured alive but critically wounded. Having both planned and led the successful operation to liberate the hostages of the Lufthansa 181 hijacking, Wegener was promoted from the rank of Lieutenant Colonel (Oberstleutnant) to Colonel (Oberst). Along with his GSG 9 assault team members, he was awarded the German Commander's Cross of the Federal Cross of Merit (Großes Bundesverdienstkreuz).

== Commander of the Federal Border Guard ==
In 1979, whilst holding the rank of Oberst (Colonel), Wegener relinquished command of the GSG 9 unit he had established to his deputy, Klaus Blätte, and was appointed as the permanent representative of the Inspector of the Federal Border Guard in the Federal Ministry of the Interior. In 1981, he was promoted to Brigadier General (Brigadegeneral) and took command of the Federal Border Guard's Border Guard Command West, a position he held until his retirement in 1989.

== Later life ==
Wegener was considered one of the world's leading sought-after experts on counter-terrorism and advised on the establishment of numerous special units in other countries, including head of the German Advisory Group at the Royal Saudi Special Security Forces (SSF). After his retirement, he continued to be a counterterrorism expert and international security advisor. From the 1980s onwards, he lived in Windhagen in the Westerwald, gave lectures, and became a member of the political party Christian Democratic Union of Germany (CDU). Wegener was also a member of the Security Committee of the German KÖTTER Group.

Wegener was widowed to Magda and is survived by his daughters, Simone and Susanne. His daughter, Simone Stewens, is a television journalist and was the director of the International Film School Cologne. Aged 88, Wegener died on 28 December 2017.

== Publications ==
- "Esprit de Corps!". Die Grenzschutzgruppe 9 (GSG 9) ("Esprit de Corps!" The Border Guard Group 9 (GSG 9)), in German. In: Reinhard Günzel Et al.: Geheime Krieger: Drei deutsche Kommandoverbände im Bild: KSK, Brandenburger, GSG 9 (Secret Warriors: Three German commando units in pictures: KSK, Brandenburgers, GSG 9), in German. Publisher: Pour le Mérite Verlag, Selent, 2006, ISBN 9783932381294, p. 87–125.
- GSG 9 – Stärker als der Terror (GSG 9 – Stronger than Terror), in German. Edited by: Ulrike Zander, Harald Biermann, Publisher: Lit Verlag, Münster, 2017, ISBN 9783643137623.

== Honours ==
- October 1977: Commander's Cross of the Federal Cross of Merit
- 1978: Golden Plate Award of the American Academy of Achievement
- 2018: a street name dedication of Ulrich-Wegener-Weg in his former place of residence, Troisdorf.
- August 2020: A street in Windhagen was named after him.
