= Hans-Jürgen Wischnewski =

German politician

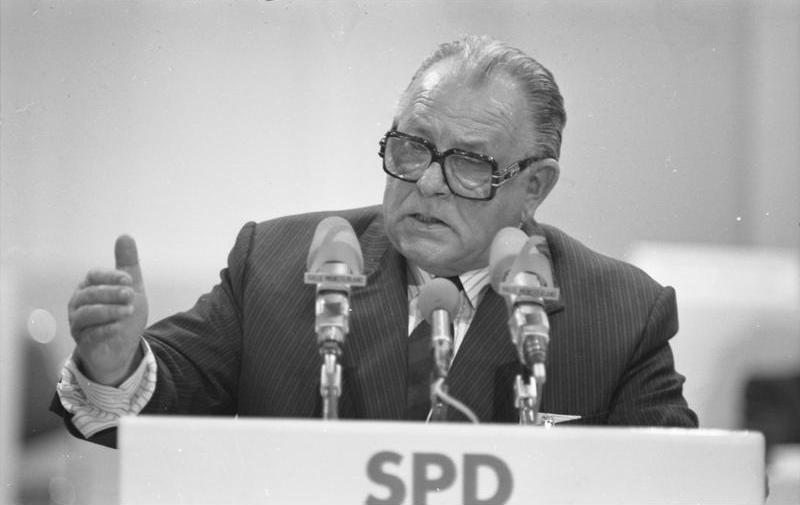
- Wischnewski speaking at an SPD party convention in Münster, 1988

Federal Minister for Economic Cooperation
- In office 1 December 1966 – 2 October 1968
- Chancellor: Kurt Georg Kiesinger
- Preceded by: Werner Dollinger
- Succeeded by: Erhard Eppler

Personal details
- Born: 24 July 1922; Allenstein, East Prussia, Weimar Republic
- Died: 24 February 2005 (aged 82); Cologne, Germany
- Political party: Social Democratic Party of Germany

Hans-Jürgen Wischnewski (24 July 1922 – 24 February 2005) was a West German politician of the Social Democratic Party (SPD). He was a member of the German Bundestag from 1957 to 1990, Federal Minister for Economic Cooperation from 1966 to 1968, Minister of State in the Federal Foreign Office from 1974 to 1976, and then Minister of State in the Federal Chancellery until 1979 and again in 1982.

Wischnewski earned the nickname "Ben Wisch" from West German Chancellor Willy Brandt due to his strong contacts in the Arab world and his engagements with the Algerian National Liberation Front (NLF). As a close confidant of Brandt's successor, Chancellor Helmut Schmidt, Wischnewski served as a special representative for negotiations during the Red Army Faction (RAF) kidnappings in the "German Autumn" of 1977. In the 1980s, he led negotiations for the release of hostages and facilitated peace talks in Latin America and the Middle East.

== Life ==
Born in Allenstein, East Prussia (now Olsztyn, Poland), Wischnewski obtained his Abitur degree in Berlin in 1941. He then served in a Panzergrenadier division of the Wehrmacht in World War II, achieving the rank of Oberleutnant. Wischnewski was decorated with the Iron Cross.

=== Career ===
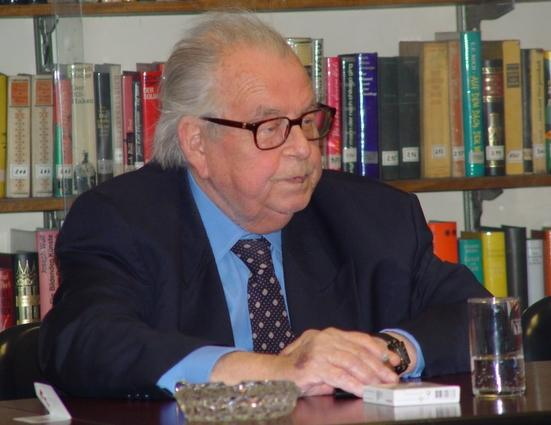
Hans-Jürgen Wischnewski in October 2002

After the war, Wischnewski joined the SPD. He was employed by a metal-working company and from 1952 trained as an IG Metall union secretary. Upon the 1957 federal election, he became a member of the Bundestag parliament and also an SPD board member in the Cologne district. He was elected federal chairman of the party's Young Socialists youth organisation in 1959 and joined the SPD federal committee in 1970, from 1979 as deputy chairman. From 1961 to 1965 he also was an elected member of the European Parliament.

On 1 December 1966, Wischnewski was appointed Federal Minister for Economic Cooperation in the grand coalition cabinet of Chancellor Kurt Georg Kiesinger. He resigned from office on 2 October 1968, to become SPD federal executive director.

In May 1974, he again joined the federal government of Chancellor Helmut Schmidt as a state secretary in the Foreign Office, after the 1976 federal election as a state minister in the German Chancellery.

=== Political influence ===
Because of his strong relations with Arab politicians since the days of the Algerian War, Wischnewski was nicknamed "Ben Wisch" by Chancellor Willy Brandt (later sometimes spoofed as "Ben Cash" because of his duty as the SPD federal treasurer). His efforts decisively improved the West German diplomatic relations with numerous Arab and African countries. Also, after the 1973 Chilean coup d'état, he played a vital role in rescuing German and European hostages.

Wischnewski became widely known internationally for his pivotal role in the negotiations during the "German Autumn" terrorist attacks of 1977. When West German business executive Hanns Martin Schleyer was kidnapped by the militant Red Army Faction (RAF) in September, Wischnewski followed the joint RAF and Popular Front for the Liberation of Palestine (PFLP) hijacking of Lufthansa Flight 181 to Mogadishu, Somalia, in October. During the hijacking, he engaged in diplomatic efforts with several Arabian governments on behalf of Federal Chancellor Helmut Schmidt and negotiated with the Somalia government. As a special representative of the West German Federal Government, he negotiated with local authorities at the airports where the plane landed, including in Mogadishu, where he successfully coordinated the West German GSG 9 counterterrorism unit's storming of the plane and rescue of 91 hostages. Three of the hijackers were killed, and the fourth survived her critical injuries.

Wischnewski later travelled to Nicaragua, to mediate between the Sandinista National Liberation Front and its Contra opponents. In Latin America, he became known as "Commandante Hans".

In 1997, for his commitment to the rights of the Palestinian people, he was awarded the highest Palestinian order by Yasser Arafat. Wischnewski was a long-time member of the German-Arabian Association until he left after a dispute with its president Jürgen Möllemann. He also was a member of the Steering Committee of the Bilderberg Group.

== See also ==
- German Autumn
