= Lufthansa Flight 181 =

1977 aircraft hijacking

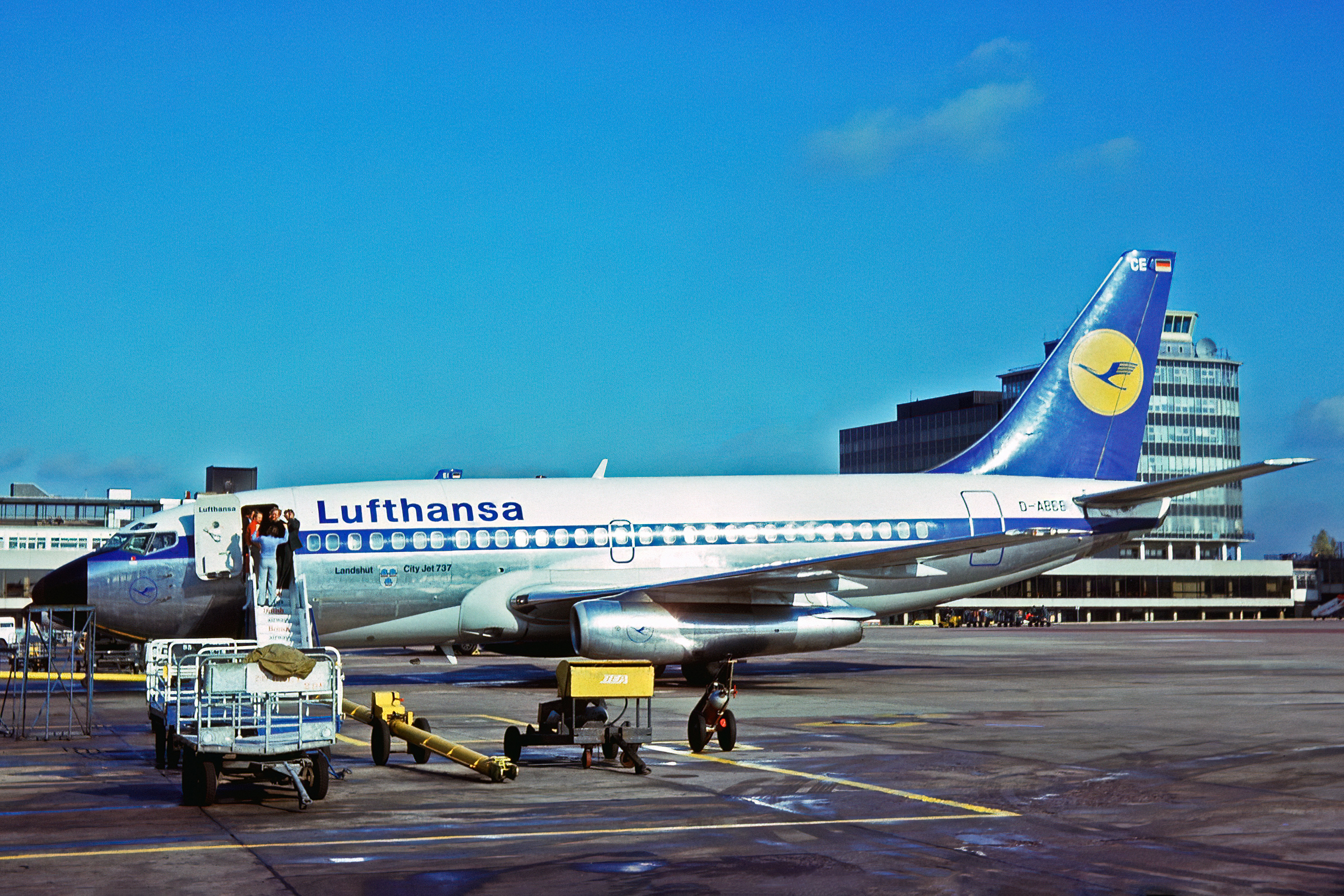
- D-ABCE, the aircraft involved in the hijacking, pictured in 1975

Hijacking
- Date: 13–18 October 1977 (5 days)
- Summary: Hijacking
- Site: Initially over the Mediterranean Sea, south of the French coast; subsequently Mogadishu International Airport, Somalia

Aircraft
- Aircraft type: Boeing 737-230C
- Aircraft name: Landshut
- Operator: Lufthansa
- IATA flight No.: LH181
- ICAO flight No.: DLH181
- Call sign: LUFTHANSA 181
- Registration: D-ABCE
- Flight origin: Palma de Mallorca Airport, Palma, Mallorca, Spain
- Destination: Frankfurt Airport, Frankfurt am Main, West Germany
- Occupants: 96
- Passengers: 87 (91 including the 4 hijackers)
- Crew: 5
- Fatalities: 4 (The captain, 3 hijackers)
- Injuries: 5 (1 flight attendant, 3 passengers, 1 hijacker)
- Survivors: 92 (All passengers, 4 crew, 1 hijacker)

The route

Lufthansa Flight 181, a Boeing 737-200 jet airliner (reg. D-ABCE) named Landshut, was hijacked on 13 October 1977 by four militants of the Popular Front for the Liberation of Palestine while en route from Palma de Mallorca, Spain, to Frankfurt am Main, West Germany. The hijacking aimed to secure the release of eleven notorious Red Army Faction leaders held in West German prisons and two Palestinians held in Turkey. This event was part of the so-called German Autumn, intended to increase pressure on the West German government. The hijackers diverted the flight to several locations before ending in Mogadishu, Somalia, where the crisis concluded in the early morning hours of 18 October 1977 under the cover of darkness. The West German counter-terrorism unit GSG 9, with ground support from the Somali Armed Forces, stormed the aircraft, rescuing all 87 passengers and four crew members. The captain of the flight was killed by the hijackers earlier in the ordeal.

== Background ==
The hijacking was a dramatic escalation in the so-called German Autumn of 1977, a period marked by a series of terrorist activities in West Germany. It was directly linked to the dramatic kidnapping in Braunsfeld, Cologne, of Hanns Martin Schleyer, a prominent West German industrialist, by the Red Army Faction (RAF) "Commando Siegfried Hausner" group on 5 September 1977. Militants of the Popular Front for the Liberation of Palestine (PFLP), working in concert with the RAF, hijacked the Lufthansa Landshut plane to secure the release of their imprisoned leaders and comrades, predominantly held in the West German supermax Stammheim Prison, as well as two Palestinians held in Turkey. The hijacking was intended to increase pressure on the West German government to meet these demands. It culminated in the West German GSG 9 rescue operation, codenamed "Feuerzauber" (German for "Magic Fire"), which resulted in the liberation of all 87 passengers and four of the five crew members. Three hijackers were killed during the rescue, and one was captured alive.

=== Lufthansa crew ===
Two flight crew and three cabin crew operated the round-trip flight from Frankfurt to Palma de Mallorca:

- Jürgen Schumann (37): Captain. Born in Colditz in 1940, he was a former German Air Force Lockheed F-104 Starfighter pilot. On 16 October at Aden Airport, after being permitted to leave the aircraft to check its airworthiness following a forced landing on an unpaved sand strip, he also spoke with Yemeni airport authorities to try to ensure the plane remained grounded. On his return, he boarded the plane after a long absence, only to be murdered by terrorist leader Zohair Yousif Akache (nom de guerre Captain Mahmoud) in a fit of rage, fueled by suspicions, before he could explain his reasons for the long absence. It was believed this act was also intended to add weight to the kidnappers' demands. Posthumously awarded the German Federal Cross of Merit 1st class for his actions during the hijack, he was survived by his wife and two sons. The building housing the Lufthansa Pilot School in Bremen was named in his honour, as was a street in the Bavarian city of Landshut. He is buried in Babenhausen in Hesse.
- Jürgen Vietor (35): Co-Pilot. Born in Kassel in 1942, a former German Navy pilot. He piloted the Landshut from Aden to Mogadishu. He returned to work just six weeks after the hijacking, and the first aircraft he was assigned to was the Landshut which had already been repaired and returned to service. He was also awarded the German Federal Cross of Merit 1st Class for his actions during the hijacking. He retired in 1999. In December 2008, he returned the medal in protest over the release on probation of the former Red Army Faction terrorist Christian Klar, who had been involved in the kidnap and murder of Hanns Martin Schleyer in 1977.
- Hannelore Piegler (33): Chief flight attendant. Austrian. She was in charge of the cabin crew, servicing the first-class passengers. For her courage and dedication to the crew and passengers during the hijacking of Lufthansa Flight 181, she was awarded the German Federal Cross of Merit. Subsequently, she authored a book titled Entführung, Hundert Stunden zwischen Angst und Hoffnung (Hijacking, Hundred Hours Between Fear and Hope), detailing the events and her journey through the ordeal.
- Anna-Maria Staringer (27/28): Flight attendant. Norwegian. Along with Piegler and Dillmann, she took responsibility for looking after and supporting the terrified passengers. She was also awarded the German Federal Cross of Merit for her courage. She marked her 28th birthday on the flight. In an unsettling gesture, Akache (Captain Mahmoud), the leader of the hijack group, ordered a birthday cake and champagne via the radio in Dubai. The airport catering supplied a cake with 28 candles, embellished with "Happy Birthday Anna-Maria".
- Gabriele Dillmann (23): Flight attendant. Despite her young age, she was a pillar of support and hope for the other hostages and was dubbed the "Angel of Mogadishu" (Engel von Mogadischu) by the German press for her courageous behaviour. Along with her flight crew, she was awarded the German Federal Cross of Merit for her courage. She subsequently married Lufthansa pilot Rüdiger von Lutzau, who piloted the Lufthansa Boeing 707 aircraft with the GSG 9 counter-terrorism unit that landed in Mogadishu. As Gabriele von Lutzau, she has acquired an international reputation as a sculptor, principally of figures in beechwood, and has shown her work in numerous exhibitions in Germany and throughout Europe.

=== Hijackers ===
- Zohair Yousif Akache (23), nom de guerre Captain Mahmoud: Also known by his Iranian passport alias Ali Hyderi. He was the leader of the hijacker group. Growing up in a refugee camp near Beirut, he later studied at the Chelsea College of Aeronautical and Automobile Engineering in London, leaving in 1975 after gaining his aeronautical diploma. A veteran terrorist, he had already murdered two Yemen Arab Republic diplomats and the wife of one of them in London on 10 April 1977, and was wanted by Scotland Yard in connection with the killings. The political assassination took place outside the Royal Lancaster Hotel, where the former Prime Minister of Yemen, Kadhi Abdullah al-Hajri (65), his wife, Fatimah (40), and a Yemeni diplomat, Abdullah Ali al Hammami, minister plenipotentiary at the embassy, were murdered in their Mercedes vehicle using a silenced .32 automatic pistol. Akache left the country that afternoon via Heathrow Airport, using a Kuwaiti passport in the name of Ahmed Badir al-Majid. More than a year earlier, Akache had also been sentenced to six months in prison for hitting a police officer while attending a meeting in Hyde Park, London, and was later deported. At the time of his arrest, British police found Palestine Liberation Organization (PLO) posters and pictures of PLO leaders in his hotel room.
- Wabil Harb (23): Also known as Nabil Harb, Iranian passport alias Riza Abbasi. Son of wealthy Christian parents in Beirut, he occasionally exchanged friendly words with the hostages. The passengers referred to him as "the boy".
- Souhaila Andrawes Sayeh (22): Also known by her Iranian passport alias Soraya Ansari. Born a Palestinian in Israel, she studied English literature in Baghdad. Despite being critically injured, she was the only one of the four hijackers to survive. The passengers referred to her as "the fat one".
- Hind Alameh (22): Also known as Nadia Shehadah Yousuf Duaibes, Iranian passport alias Shanaz Gholoun. Born to Christian parents in Lebanon, she was described by survivors of Lufthansa Flight 181 as an unusually pretty, petite girl. Sometimes, she was the only one who laughed on the plane, and the passengers referred to her as "the little one".

At the time, the hijackers' names remained unknown to the passengers and crew of Lufthansa Flight 181, other than Captain Mahmoud's alias, so the passengers and crew referred to them by nicknames. To this day, the survivors still refer to them as "the little one," "the fat one," "the boy," and "Captain Mahmoud".

==== Hostage ordeal ====
During the five-day ordeal, the hijackers terrorized the passengers and crew with verbal abuse, physical assaults, and restraint, subjecting them to psychological torture and threats of further physical harm or death. They frequently yelled at passengers, demanding Jewish passengers to identify themselves and sifted through the passengers' passports, luggage, and personal possessions to search for clues indicating Jewish identity. At one point, Mahmoud found a Montblanc pen in a passenger's luggage. Mistaking the snowcap logo on the cap of the pen for the Star of David, he accused the female passenger of being Jewish. Despite the passenger's desperate denial, Mahmoud declared, "You report for shooting tomorrow morning at 8:30, understood?" The hijackers also reacted with rage upon finding a watch from Junghans, a company whose logo also bore resemblance to the Star of David, among the possessions of passengers. Almost as feared as the leader, Mahmoud, was Andrawes Sayeh, whom some passengers later described as equally zealous.

Aribert Martin, one of the West German GSG 9 commandos who stormed the Lufthansa Landshut aircraft in Mogadishu to rescue the hostages, recalled, "The first thing that hit me was an unbelievable stench. The terrorists hadn't let the hostages go to the toilet, so the passengers had to relieve themselves in their seats. This had been going on for five days. I could smell that stench for years." This recollection was echoed by his colleague, Peter Horstmüller, who also stormed the aircraft, and other GSG 9 commandos.

=== Notable hostages ===
- Horst-Gregorio Canellas, German football official responsible for breaking the 1971 Bundesliga scandal was one of the hostages on board, along with his daughter.

=== Key West German rescue personnel ===
- Lieutenant Colonel (Oberstleutnant) Ulrich Wegener (48): Founder and commander of GSG 9 (Border Guard Group 9), the specialized counter-terrorism tactical intervention unit of the Federal Border Guard (Bundesgrenzschutz), established by West Germany in 1972 shortly after the Munich Olympic massacre. Wegener planned and led the daring operation to rescue the hostages on Lufthansa Flight 181 (Landshut).
- Major Klaus Blätte (38): Deputy commander of GSG 9 in 1977 who took part in the operation to storm the Landshut at Mogadishu. When Wegener was promoted in 1979, Blätte succeeded him as commander of GSG 9.
- Minister Hans-Jürgen Wischnewski (55): Minister of State in the Federal Chancellery, designated by Chancellor Helmut Schmidt as his special envoy to coordinate the political negotiations with various foreign governments to facilitate the release or rescue of the Landshut hostages. Due to his excellent contacts and personal relationships with Arab leaders, he was nicknamed "Ben Wisch" by the German press. When Helmut Schmidt was succeeded by Helmut Kohl, Wischnewski became a traveling consultant to Arab, African, and South American countries, advising them on negotiating techniques and pacification policies to deal with terrorist and insurgent groups. He died in 2005.
- Chancellor Helmut Schmidt (58): German Federal Chancellor (Bundeskanzler) from 1974 and 1982, he adopted a tough, uncompromising stance on the Hanns Martin Schleyer kidnapping and the Lufthansa 181 hijacking in 1977. He authorized the GSG 9 mission to rescue the Landshut hostages, and his anti-terrorism policies were successful in overcoming the long-standing threat posed by the Red Army Faction. After retiring from the Bundestag in 1986, he helped found the committee supporting the Economic and Monetary Union of the European Union and the creation of the European Central Bank. He died in 2015.

== Hijacking ==
At 13:55 Central European Time (CET) on Thursday, 13 October 1977, Lufthansa flight LH 181, a Boeing 737 named Landshut, took off from Palma de Mallorca Airport en route to Frankfurt Airport with 87 passengers (91 including the 4 hijackers) and five crew members. The hijackers were able to board the aircraft carrying two concealed pistols, four hand grenades, and 500 grams (18 oz) of plastic explosive due to lax airport security in Palma, Spain. The flight was piloted by Captain Jürgen Schumann, with co-pilot Jürgen Vietor at the controls.

About 30 minutes later, while overflying Marseille, the aircraft was hijacked by four militants of the Popular Front for the Liberation of Palestine (PFLP), who called themselves "Commando Martyr Halima" in honour of fellow German militant Brigitte Kuhlmann. Kuhlmann, who used the nom de guerre "Halima", had been killed in Operation Entebbe in Uganda the previous year. The leader of the hijacker group, adopting the nom de guerre Captain Mahmoud, angrily burst into the cockpit, brandishing a fully loaded pistol. He forcibly removed Vietor from the cockpit, sending him to the economy class area to join the passengers and flight attendants, leaving Schumann at the flight controls. As the other three hijackers knocked over food trays and ordered the hostages to put their hands on their heads, Mahmoud coerced Captain Schumann to fly east to Larnaca in Cyprus but was told that the plane had insufficient fuel and would have to land in Rome first.

=== Rome ===
The hijacked aircraft changed course at around 14:38 CET, as reported by air traffic controllers in southern France near Aix-en-Provence, diverting eastward and landing at Fiumicino Airport in Rome at 15:45 CET for refuelling. At around 17:00 CET, the hijackers made their first demands via the control tower, acting in concert with a Red Army Faction group, the Commando Siegfried Hausner group, which had kidnapped West German industrialist Hanns Martin Schleyer five weeks earlier. They demanded the release of all "comrades" imprisoned in the Federal Republic (West Germany), specifically the eleven Red Army Faction (RAF) terrorists detained predominantly at the supermax Stammheim Prison in Stuttgart.

The West German government expected active support for its tough anti-terrorism policy from its NATO and EC partners. West German Interior Minister Werner Maihofer contacted his Italian counterpart Francesco Cossiga and urged that the take-off of the hijacked plane be prevented by all means possible—whether by blocking the runway, which was initiated hesitantly or by shooting out the tyres during take-off. Cossiga never considered this, because the airport administration had unilaterally complied with the kidnappers' request to refuel the plane. Firing on the plane as it took off could easily have led to an explosion and thus a bloodbath among the passengers. After consulting with his colleagues, Cossiga decided that the most desirable solution for the Italian government was to rid itself of the problem altogether and not become a target of international terrorism through forceful action. At 17:42 CET, the Landshut took off unhindered towards Cyprus, even without obtaining clearance from Rome air traffic control.

=== Hijackers demands and ultimatum ===
While maintaining a rigorous news blackout, the West German government, stalling for time—a strategy they had already adopted early in the crisis of the kidnapping of West German industrialist Hanns Martin Schleyer on 5 September—asked the hijackers to "clarify" some points in their communiqué. The West German government had previously proposed Geneva lawyer Denis Payot, president of the Swiss League for Human and Citizen Rights (Ligue suisse des droits de l'homme et du citoyen), as a middleman for negotiations with Schleyer's kidnappers. Payot, a 35-year-old lawyer, was first mentioned by Schleyer's kidnappers when they demanded that Payot and Martin Niemoeller, an 85-year-old German theologian, Lutheran pastor, and former opponent of the Nazi regime, accompany the eleven Red Army Faction members on a flight to a country that would be named after they were freed from prison.

A letter in English, dated 13 October by the hijackers but received on Friday night, 14 October, addressed to Federal Chancellor Helmut Schmidt, was delivered to Payot, as well as the French newspaper France-Soir, the Agence France-Presse (AFP) in Paris, and the Frankfurter Rundschau. The hijacking of Lufthansa Flight 181 had intensified the pressure on the West German government to have the Red Army Faction prisoners flown out, reaching an extreme level. Observers in the Federal Chancellery in Bonn were now firmly expecting a prisoner-hostage exchange.

The letter, which Payot said contained "demands and precise deadlines," was immediately forwarded to the Federal Chancellery in Bonn. Payot kept an earlier promise to the West German government that he would not divulge details of the messages that went through his office. Schleyer's kidnappers had contacted the lawyer fourteen times by telephone between September 6 and 17. Telephone calls made from West Germany to Payot's number were intercepted by the West German Federal Criminal Police Agency from the Frankfurt telecommunications office, and a "call trace" was also set up that allowed these calls to be traced back to telephone booths in Cologne. The French authorities discovered that Payot had also been called several times from Gare du Nord in Paris. The letter received by Payot from the hijackers, addressed to Chancellor Helmut Schmidt, stated:

Ultimatum to the Chancellor of the Federal Republic of Germany.

We hereby inform you that the passengers and crew of Lufthansa aircraft 737, flight number LH 181, from Palma to Frankfurt (M[ain]) are under our complete control and responsibility. The lives of the passengers and crew and the life of Dr. Hanns Martin Schleyer depends on your fulfilling the following demands:

1. Release of the following RAF comrades from West German prisons: Andreas Baader, Gudrun Ensslin, Jan Carl Raspe, Verena Becker, Werner Hoppe, Karl-Heinz Dellwo, Hanna Krabbe, Bernd Rössner, Ingrid Schubert, Irmgard Möller, Günter Sonnenberg. Each person is to receive DM 100,000.
2. Release of the following Palestinian F.L.P. comrades from prison in Istanbul: - Mahdi - Hussein.
3. The payment of 15 million US dollars according to the attached instructions.
4. Make arrangements with one of the following countries to receive the comrades who have been released: Democratic Republic of Vietnam, Republic of Somalia, People's Democratic Republic of Yemen.
5. The German prisoners should be taken to their destination in an aircraft provided by you, you should fly via Istanbul and take on the two Palestinian comrades released from the prison there. The Turkish Government is well informed of our demands. All prisoners should reach their destination by Sunday, 16 October 1977, 08:00 GMT. The money should be handed over within the same period in accordance with the enclosed instructions.
6. If all prisoners are not released and reach their destination and the money is not handed over as instructed within the specified time, Hanns Martin Schleyer and all passengers and the crew of Lufthansa aircraft 737, flight LH 181, will be killed immediately.
7. If you comply with our instructions, everyone will be released.
8. We will not attempt to contact you again. This will be our last contact with you. You will be held responsible for any error or failure in releasing the above prisoners or in handing over the specified ransom as instructed.
9. Any attempt at delay or deception on your part will result in the immediate expiration of the ultimatum and the execution of Hanns Martin Schleyer, the passengers and the crew of the aircraft.

13 October 1977,
Organization for the Fight against World Imperialism.

The letter to the Federal Republic of West Germany comprised two statements from the hijackers, who identified themselves as members of an "Organization for the Fight against World Imperialism." The first statement reiterated the demands made by Schleyer's kidnappers, while the second statement, titled "Operation Kafr Qaddum" was addressed to "all revolutionaries in the world," "all free Arabs," and "our Palestinian masses," attempting to provide a political justification for their actions. Additionally, a third statement was provided by the Commando Siegfried Hausner Red Army Faction, who were holding Hanns Martin Schleyer hostage.

Because this demand from the hijackers included prisoners held in Turkey, the West German Federal Government was in constant contact with the Turkish government from 14 October until the hostages' liberation on 18 October.

=== Larnaca ===
The Landshut landed in Larnaca, Cyprus, at 20:28 CET. After about an hour, a local Palestine Liberation Organization (PLO) representative arrived at the airport and, over the radio, tried to persuade Mahmoud to release the hostages. This only provoked a furious response from Mahmoud, who angrily screamed at him in Arabic until the PLO representative gave up and left. The aircraft was then refuelled, and Schumann asked flight control for routing to Beirut. He was told that Beirut Airport was blockaded and closed to them, and Mahmoud suggested that they fly to Damascus instead. The Landshut took off at 22:50 CET, heading for Beirut, but was refused permission to land there at 23:01 CET. After also being denied landing permission in Damascus at 23:14 CET, Baghdad at 00:23 CET (14 October), and Kuwait at 00:58 CET, they flew to Bahrain.

=== Bahrain ===
Schumann was informed by a passing Qantas airliner that Bahrain International Airport was also closed to them. Schumann radioed flight control and stated that they had insufficient fuel to fly elsewhere. Despite being told again that the airport was closed, he was suddenly given an automatic landing frequency by the flight controller. The plane finally touched down in Bahrain at 01:52 CET on 14 October. Upon arrival, the aircraft was immediately surrounded by armed troops. Mahmoud radioed the control tower, threatening to shoot the co-pilot unless the soldiers were withdrawn. After a stand-off with the control tower, during which Mahmoud set a five‑minute deadline and held a loaded pistol to Vietor's head, the troops were withdrawn. The aircraft was then refuelled and took off for Dubai at 03:24 CET.

=== Dubai ===
Approaching Dubai, the 737 was again denied landing permission. Overflying Dubai International Airport in the early light of dawn, the hijackers and pilots saw the runway blocked with military jeeps, trucks, and fire engines. Running short of fuel, Schumann radioed the control tower to announce that they were going to land anyway. As they made a low pass over the airport, the vehicles were finally being removed. At 05:40 CET, the pilots made a smooth touchdown on the airport's main runway at sunrise. The plane was parked at the parking bay around 05:51 CET, at daybreak.

In Dubai, the hijackers instructed the control tower to send airport crew staff to empty the toilet tanks, supply food, water, medicine, and newspapers, and take away the rubbish. Captain Schumann was able to communicate the number of hijackers on board, specifying that there were two male and two female hijackers by dropping different types of cigarettes on the tarmac from the cockpit window. In an interview with journalists, this information was revealed by Dubai's Sheikh Mohammed bin Rashid Al Maktoum, then Minister of Defence. The hijackers learned about this, possibly from the radio, causing an enraged Mahmoud to angrily threaten Schumann's life for secretly sharing this coded message.

The aircraft remained parked on the tarmac at Dubai International Airport throughout Saturday, 15 October, during which the jet airliner experienced technical snags with the electrical generator, air conditioning, and auxiliary power unit breaking down. The hijackers demanded that engineers fix the plane. On the morning of Sunday, 16 October, Mahmoud threatened to start shooting hostages if the aircraft was not refuelled, and Dubai authorities eventually agreed to refuel the plane.

In the meantime, Hans-Jürgen Wischnewski, the West German minister responsible for handling the hijacking crisis, Oberstleutnant Ulrich Wegener, commander of the elite West German counter-terrorism tactical intervention unit GSG 9, along with his adjutants, and Gerhard Boeden, head of the counter-terrorism department at the West German Federal Criminal Police Agency, arrived in Dubai to persuade the United Arab Emirates government to allow the GSG 9 to storm the Lufthansa aircraft and rescue the hostages. However, after permission was granted, senior operatives from GSG 9, supported by two SAS operatives who had joined the German officials in Dubai at the behest of the British government, insisted on additional rehearsals and dry-runs on an adjacent airstrip.

There are many legends surrounding the use of stun grenades in the rescue operation. The British SAS (Special Air Service Regiment) offered these new types of grenades, which were tested for effectiveness in Dubai. Due to the high metal-oxidant mix, the grenades were deemed unsuitable and were not used in the plane. Reports suggest that up to 45 hours of dry run preparations were conducted while in Dubai, totalling over 80 hours.

While Wegener was contemplating his options, the jet airliner was on the move again after the hijackers fully refuelled the Landshut plane and the pilots started up the engines. At 12:19 CET on Sunday, 16 October, it took off, bound for Salalah and Masirah Island in Oman, where permission to land was once again denied and both airports were blockaded. After Riyadh in Saudi Arabia also closed and blockaded its airport runways at 14:50 CET on 16 October (three days after the hijacking began), a course was set to Aden in South Yemen, at the limit of the plane's fuel range.

=== Aden and murder of Captain Schumann ===
Approaching Aden airspace, the flight was once again denied permission to land at Aden International Airport, just as it had been at the other airports in the region. Both main runways and the apron were blocked by military jeeps, tanks, and other vehicles. With the plane running dangerously low on fuel, the Aden airport authorities adamantly refused to clear the runways, leaving the pilots little choice but to make a forced landing on an unpaved sand strip roughly parallel to both runways at 15:55 CET.

The plane remained largely intact following the ground roll. However, when the Aden authorities instructed the hijackers and pilots to fly away, both pilots were concerned about the aircraft's airworthiness after its rough landing on rugged, rocky, and sandy terrain. They deemed it unsafe to take off and fly the jet airliner again until a thorough engineering inspection had been conducted. After the engineers claimed that the airframe was intact, Mahmoud allowed Schumann to check the condition of the landing gear and engines. Both engines had ingested a copious amount of sand and dirt at maximum reverse thrust and were clogged. The landing gear had not collapsed, but its structure was weakened, and its extension/retraction mechanism was damaged.

Schumann did not immediately return to the plane after inspecting it, despite numerous calls from the hijackers threatening to detonate the aircraft due to his long absence. The reasons for Schumann's prolonged absence remained unclear for a long time. It was only in 2008, as part of a television documentary, that the man who had met Schumann at the airport in Aden was identified: Sheikh Ahmed Mansur, an air force general in command of a special Yemeni unit, who controlled the airport and surrounded the plane. Mansur testified that the captain, concerned for the lives of his passengers, demanded that they comply with the hijackers' demands. "I told him: I can fulfill any other request, but it is impossible for the passengers to disembark and the hijackers to negotiate from Yemeni soil. The conversation lasted eight to nine minutes," Mansur said. "He only spoke to me." The ex-general also recalled Schumann's last words: "I'm going back now. I'm sure they're going to kill me." Schumann boarded the plane, only to be confronted by Mahmoud's wrath. In a fit of rage fueled by suspicions, Mahmoud furiously forced him to kneel on the cabin floor, shouting that he had betrayed the passengers: "Guilty or not guilty?" Without giving Schumann a chance to explain, Mahmoud shot him in the head, in front of terrified passengers, including children. It was believed that this act was also meant to strengthen the demands of the joint operation between the Red Army Faction (RAF) and the Popular Front for the Liberation of Palestine (PFPL).

The hijacked plane was refuelled at 01:00 CET on 17 October. At 02:02 CET, with co-pilot Vietor at the controls, it dangerously and sluggishly took off from Aden, bound for the Somali capital of Mogadishu.

=== Mogadishu ===
On the morning of 17 October at daybreak, around 04:34 CET, the Landshut made an unannounced textbook landing on the main runway at Mogadishu International Airport. The Somali government had initially refused the plane permission to land but relented when the jet airliner appeared in Somali airspace, fearing for the passengers' lives. The chief hijacker, Mahmoud (Akache), told co-pilot Vietor that he was very impressed by Vietor's flying skills and that he was free to disembark and flee since the crippled plane was in no state to fly elsewhere. Vietor, however, chose to stay on board with the 87 passengers and three remaining crew members.

After the twin‐engine aircraft was parked in front of the main airport terminal, it was surrounded at a distance by armed Somali troops. Schumann's corpse, which had been stored in a coat closet on board the flight throughout the final leg of the journey, was dumped via the aircraft's right rear door onto the tarmac and whisked away in an ambulance. During the day, the hijackers asked for food and medication, which were sent after the Somali government gave its permission; a Somali request that the hijackers release the women and children in exchange for the supplies was rejected. The hijackers set a 16:00 CET deadline for the Red Army Faction (RAF) prisoners to be released, threatening to blow up the aircraft. Subsequently, the hijackers prepared to detonate the aircraft by planting plastic explosives in the cabin. They tied up the hostages using nylon tights taken from female passengers and poured duty-free perfume and spirits over them, telling them it would make them burn better in the planned explosion, which ultimately did not happen. The hijackers were then told that the West German government had agreed to release the RAF prisoners and that their transfer to Mogadishu would take several more hours, but this was a ruse. The hijackers agreed to extend the deadline to 02:30 CET the following morning (18 October). Mahmoud, now in high spirits, projected himself as the victor as the hijackers untied the hostages. Unbeknownst to them, however, the West German counter-terrorism unit GSG 9 was preparing to storm the Lufthansa aircraft and bring the dramatic hijacking to a decisive end.

== Rescue ==
=== Operation Feuerzauber: The German GSG 9 assault ===
Operation Feuerzauber (Magic Fire)
Date	18 October 1977
Location	Mogadishu, Somali Democratic Republic
Result	GSG 9 victory

Belligerents
(West Germany) GSG 9 (United Kingdom) 22 SAS (supporting role) (Somalia) Somali Army (ground support)	Popular Front for the Liberation of Palestine; Red Army Faction

Commanders and leaders
(West Germany) Ulrich Wegener (United Kingdom) Alastair Morrison (Somalia) Siad Barre (Somalia) Hussein Kulmiye Afrah	Zohair Y. Akache †

Strength
(West Germany) 60 GSG 9 operators (approx.) (United Kingdom) 2 SAS operators	4 hijackers

Casualties and losses
1 wounded	3 killed 1 wounded/captured
- 4 civilians wounded (1 flight attendant, 3 passengers)

While West German Chancellor Helmut Schmidt attempted to negotiate an agreement with Somali President Siad Barre from Bonn, special envoy Hans-Jürgen Wischnewski, GSG 9 commander Ulrich Wegener, and his adjutants Dieter Fox and officer Frieder Baum, who had all been trailing the hijacked Landshut flight and monitoring the situation as part of Wischnewski's mobile crisis management team, arrived at Mogadishu from Jeddah.

In West Germany, a team of approximately 60 GSG 9 Federal Border Guard (Bundesgrenzschutz) counter-terrorism commandos consisting of two units as well as technicians, field telecoms engineers, and paramedics, led by Wegener's deputy commander, Klaus Blätte, had already assembled at Sankt Augustin-Hangelar near Bonn and were on standby, awaiting instructions. One of the GSG 9 units had already dispatched from West Germany to trail the Landshut and had landed at a NATO military base in Crete, expecting to be deployed while the Landshut was in Cyprus.

On the evening of 16 October, the 1st unit GSG 9, flew from the Porz-Wahn military airfield to a NATO military base in Crete to meet the 3rd unit GSG 9. After the Landshut captain, Jürgen Schumann, was shot dead in Aden (Yemen), the probability of GSG 9 being deployed increased. They were ordered to follow the Landshut with an unspecified destination. The Lufthansa Boeing 707 aircraft, Stuttgart, carrying the GSG 9 assault team, flew from Crete towards Africa and finally to Mogadishu. It was co-piloted by Rüdiger von Lutzau, Gabriele Dillmann's fiancé.

While the GSG 9 assault team was waiting in Djibouti airspace, an agreement was reached, and Somalia gave the green light for the rescue operation at Mogadishu. Federal Chancellor Helmut Schmidt then held a telephone conversation with GSG 9 commander Ulrich Wegener, ending with words implying, "Over to you." To this end, the West German government not only pledged considerable financial resources to Somalia but – much more importantly for the incumbent Somali 'president' Siad Barre, in reality, a coup plotter – covert support in the purchase of highly sought-after West German-made weapons for the then-ongoing war against neighbouring Ethiopia.

On 17 October, the aircraft carrying the GSG 9 assault team landed at Mogadishu International Airport at 17:30 CET with all its lights off to avoid detection by the hijackers. It parked about 2 kilometres (1.2 mi) away on the joint-use military airport side. The Somali Air Force had flown outdated MiGs over the airport all day, taking off and landing as a diversion. This ensured the terrorists in the hijacked plane would not notice the 707 with Wegener's GSG 9 assault team landing, as Mogadishu airport had been closed to civilian traffic.

After four hours of unloading all of their equipment and conducting the necessary reconnaissance, Wegener and Blätte finalised the assault plan, scheduled to begin at 00:01 CET on 18 October. They decided to approach from the tail of the aircraft, its blind spot. Six GSG 9 assault teams would use aluminium ladders with tips bound in rubber to gain access to all entry and exit doors, as well as the escape hatches in the fuselage via the overwing doors. Meanwhile, German representatives in the airport tower fed Mahmoud a fictitious progress report on the journey of the released prisoners. Mahmoud was informed that the plane carrying the prisoners had departed from Cairo after refuelling. He was then asked to provide the conditions for the prisoner-hostage exchange over the radio.

Eight GSG 9 observation and sniper commandos armed with the specialised Heckler & Koch G3 SG1 sniper rifles, led by deputy commander Blätte, strategically positioned themselves approximately 200 metres (660 ft) away, encircling the Lufthansa Landshut aircraft. They reported all significant events and movements, securing the approach for the GSG 9 assault teams. At 23:15 CET, six GSG 9 assault teams, along with GSG 9 technicians and paramedics, began their cautious and slow approach to the tail of the Landshut aircraft. By 23:52 CET, the GSG 9 assault teams had taken up positions under the fuselage of the aircraft.

The GSG 9 assault team relied on their Somali counterparts to create a diversion. Moments before the GSG 9 assault, Somali soldiers set off a massive explosion about 300 metres (980 ft) in front of the jet airliner as a distraction tactic. This prompted Mahmoud and one of the other three hijackers to rush to the cockpit to observe what was happening, isolating them from the hostages in the cabin.

After the GSG 9 observation and sniper command reported over the radio that the two male hijackers and the co-pilot were in the cockpit, the assault teams approached their assigned aircraft doors, put up their rubber-tipped aluminum ladders, and waited for the order to enter. At 00:05 CET, GSG 9 commander Wegener gave the order "Operation Feuerzauber!, Go!" (Operation Magic Fire). Two British SAS operators threw new types of diversionary "flashbang" stun grenades into the air over the front exterior of the cockpit to distract and cause confusion inside. Whilst the GSG 9 observation and sniper command surrounding the aircraft provided cover, the GSG 9 assault teams swiftly climbed up their ladders, tore open the aircraft doors, and entered. Wegener, leading one of two groups, opened the forward doors. Two other groups, one led by Joachim Hümmer, stormed the aircraft using ladders to climb up onto the wings and simultaneously open both overwing emergency doors. Meanwhile, two teams, one led by Dieter Fox, each opened the rear doors. Aribert Martin, positioned as the "second man" at the rear right door, stormed into the aircraft. He recalls, "The first thing that hit me was an unbelievable stench. The terrorists hadn't let the hostages go to the toilet, so the passengers had to relieve themselves in their seats. This had been going on for five days. I could smell that stench for years." Though the GSG 9 assault teams were armed with Heckler & Koch MP5 submachine guns, only the Heckler & Koch P9S semi-automatic pistols with special hollow-point ammunition were to be used inside the aircraft, including S&W 4" Model 19 service revolvers. Wegener himself carried a .38 S&W Special 4" Model 19 service revolver. Each GSG 9 assault team consisted of two men holding a ladder, three climbing it, one opening the door, and another, weapon ready, storming into the plane, followed by the rest of the team. Fox found himself with a clear path, with the hijackers further up the plane. He grabbed Birgitt Röhll, one of the first passengers, and her 10-year-old son, Stephan, and rushed them to the exit. With this, the first evacuation of hostages through the rear aircraft doors had begun.

A firefight lasting around two minutes ensued, during which the leader of the hijackers, Mahmoud, was killed appearing from the cockpit, and a young male hijacker and a female hijacker were critically wounded in the first-class aisle. The young male hijacker was able to detonate a hand grenade as he lay dying, wounding stewardess Gabriele Dillmann in the legs. Fortunately, the grenade did not have a fragmentation casing. The other young female hijacker, Hind Alameh, was initially unspotted and feared to have hidden among the evacuating passengers. After a brief search, she emerged from taking cover in the forward lavatory and was fatally shot when she opened fire through the door gap on the GSG 9 commandos.

Shouting in German and English for the passengers and crew to get their heads down, the GSG 9 assault teams shot all four terrorists, killing Hind Alameh, Wabil Harb, and Zohair Akache (Mahmoud), and critically wounding Souhaila Andrawes Sayeh. One GSG 9 member was wounded in the neck by return fire from the hijackers. Three passengers and a flight attendant, Gabriele Dillmann, were slightly wounded by the hijacker's grenade explosion.

During the assault, as gunfire was exchanged, the evacuation of hostages first began through the rear aircraft doors, followed by the emergency wing exits. The passengers and crew were urgently ordered and ushered to evacuate the aircraft. Three or four intense minutes later, the radios crackled in German: "We have control of the plane!" And then: "No casualties, no casualties, no casualties! All hostages are freed, freed!" ("Wir haben die Kontrolle über die Maschine!", "Keine Opfer, keine Opfer, keine Opfer! Alle Geiseln sind befreit, befreit!"). Just seven intense minutes after the assault had begun, GSG 9 commander Wegener gave the codeword: "Frühlingszeit!" (Springtime!), signaling the successful completion of the operation. Moments later, a crucial message reached West German Chancellor Schmidt in Bonn: "Four opponents down – hostages free – four hostages slightly wounded – one border guard commando slightly wounded." The tension broke, replaced by a wave of relief and triumph.

An American passenger, Christine Santiago, aboard the plane described the rescue: "I saw the door open and a man appears. His face was painted black and he started shouting in German "We're here to rescue you, get down!" (Wir sind hier, um euch zu retten, runter!) and they started shooting."

In press news footage, one female hijacker who survived her gunshot wounds, Andrawes Sayeh, was seen lying on a stretcher covered in blood after being shot in the legs and lungs. After the passengers were freed, as she was wheeled through the arrivals hall of Mogadishu airport, she raised her hand in a victory sign and uttered, "Kill me, we will win!".

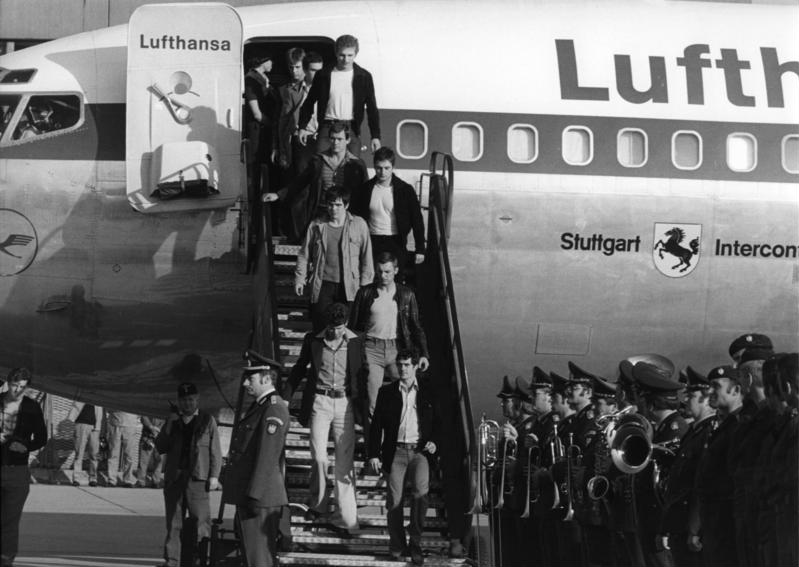
Lufthansa Boeing 707 named Stuttgart landed at Cologne Bonn Airport on 18 October 1977, with State Minister Hans-Jürgen Wischnewski and the GSG 9 counter-terrorism assault team (pictured) onboard. The rescued hostages returned on a separate Lufthansa Boeing 707 aircraft named Köln. Photograph by Ludwig Wegmann.

The rescuers safely escorted all 87 passengers and 4 crew members off the Lufthansa Landshut aircraft. A few hours later, they were all flown to Cologne Bonn Airport, landing in the early afternoon of Tuesday, 18 October. The GSG 9 assault team received a hero's welcome at the airport, while the hostages, arriving on a separate flight, were met with overwhelming emotional relief.

=== Global praise ===
On 20 October, at the Federal Chancellery in Bonn, GSG 9 commander Ulrich Wegener and the GSG 9 assault team members were each awarded the Federal Cross of Merit for their meritorious actions in the successful rescue of the hostages of Lufthansa Flight 181. The two British SAS operatives, who returned on the same flight with the GSG 9 assault team at the insistence of West German officials, met German Chancellor Schmidt in Bonn. He paid them the highest compliment, and both later received awards from the British government for their supporting role.

After the successful rescue operation, commendations from around the world poured into Bonn, many accompanied by requests for police training from the elite West German GSG 9 counter-terrorism unit.

=== British government and SAS role ===
Practical help came from West German Chancellor Helmut Schmidt's telephone conversations with British Prime Minister James Callaghan, whom the Chancellor had asked to influence Dubai, given the significant British influence in the former British protected states and Gulf sheikhdoms. Chancellor Schmidt's goal was to apply influence on Dubai to prevent the Landshut from continuing further and allow the West German GSG 9 to rescue the hostages, as Dubai was then considered the only suitable place in the Middle East for such an operation. An ad hoc team was then set up in London, consisting of representatives of the British Foreign and Defence Ministries, the MI6 Secret Service, other Middle East experts, and the ambassador of the United Arab Emirates. The foreign policy office in the West German Federal Chancellery, led by Jürgen Ruhfus, was also involved. In addition to maps, the British government provided two security experts from their Special Air Service (SAS), later known as Major Alastair Morrison accompanied by Sergeant Barry Davies from the SAS's Pagoda Team, as well as new types of diversionary "flashbang" stun grenades and special bulletproof vests, which were later used in Mogadishu.

For a long time, there were persistent rumours that the two SAS operators had helped to draw up the operational plan. However, Wegener, the commander of the GSG 9 rescue operation, dismissed these claims as complete nonsense. Wegener said, 'The SAS operators proposed a completely different tactic from the one we preferred. Our concept involved penetrating the aircraft through all entrances and exits'—rather than just one.

There are also many legends surrounding the use of stun grenades in the rescue operation. Wegener said in an interview that the British SAS (Special Air Service Regiment) offered the grenades, which were tested for effectiveness in Dubai. Due to the high metal-oxidant mix, the grenades were deemed unsuitable and were not used in the plane; they also would not have contributed to the success of the operation. However, GSG 9 commander Wegener assigned the two British SAS operatives to participate in the GSG 9 assault operation, specifically deploying the British special "flash-bang" stun grenades around the front exterior of the Lufthansa Landshut aircraft at the very moment the GSG 9 assault teams would storm the aircraft.

In the United Kingdom, Queen Elizabeth II awarded Major Alastair Morrison the Order of the British Empire (OBE) and Sergeant Barry Davies the British Empire Medal (BEM) for their crucial roles in aiding West German officials. Their intimate knowledge of the Persian Gulf states and the Horn of Africa, gained during their SAS service in the British protected states, along with practical support under the direction of the British government, facilitated co-operation from local authorities in the region for the West German officials. This support aided the West German government's rescue efforts and contingency planning for operations on the southern coastline of the Arabian Peninsula.

== Aftermath ==
Following the rescue of the hostages from Lufthansa Flight 181, RAF (Red Army Faction) members Andreas Baader, Gudrun Ensslin, and Jan-Carl Raspe were found dead (allegedly by suicide) on the same night at the supermax Stammheim Prison in Stuttgart. RAF member Irmgard Möller also allegedly attempted suicide with a cutlery knife but survived her injuries.

On Wednesday, 19 October, the body of German industry president Hanns Martin Schleyer, who had been kidnapped by the RAF five weeks before the hijacking and was held hostage for 43 days, was found in the boot of a green Audi 100 with Bad Homburg registration plates on a side street, rue Charles-Péguy, in Mulhouse, Alsace, France, close to the French-Swiss and French-German borders. The RAF had shot him dead upon hearing about the deaths of their imprisoned comrades. They contacted the French newspaper Libération to announce his 'execution'; a subsequent post-mortem examination indicated that he had been killed the previous day.

Of the 20 people identified as perpetrators in Schleyer's kidnapping, 17 were caught and convicted, two were shot during arrest. One person was not captured and was considered missing. Those involved who are still alive did not reveal the name of the individual responsible for the execution for a long time. In September 2007, former RAF member Peter-Jürgen Boock publicly stated that Rolf Heißler and Stefan Wisniewski were the perpetrators.

After the Landshut crisis, the West German government demonstrated its resolve to never negotiate with terrorists, as it had done in 1972 with the Lufthansa Flight 649 and Lufthansa Flight 615 hijackers, and in the 1975 Peter Lorenz kidnapping. Chancellor Helmut Schmidt was widely praised among Western countries for his decision to storm the aircraft to rescue the hostages, although some criticized the risky action.

West German-Somali relations received a significant boost after the successful rescue operation. Lufthansa henceforth serviced all Somali Airlines planes in West Germany, while Frankfurt became Somali Airlines' new gateway to Europe. As a sign of gratitude, the West German government issued two multi-million dollar loans to the Somali government to assist in the development of the country's fisheries, agriculture, and other sectors.

=== Fate of the Landshut ===
Originally built in January 1970, the Landshut is a Boeing 737-230C with two Pratt & Whitney JT8D-9A engines, named after the city of Landshut in Bavaria. While under the control of the hijackers, the plane had traveled 10,000 kilometres (6,200 mi). The damaged aircraft was ferried back to Germany, repaired, and returned to service in late November 1977. It continued to fly for Lufthansa until September 1985 and was sold three months later, subsequently changing hands several times, finally with TAF Linhas Aéreas. The plane continued flying until January 2008, when it was placed into storage at Fortaleza Airport owing to severe damage that made it unairworthy.

==== Preservation and proposed exhibition ====
On 14 August 2017, an ex-pilot group suggested bringing the plane back to Germany. David Dornier, former director of the Dornier Museum, along with the German Foreign Ministry, subsequently agreed to the project. The 737 was acquired for R$75,936 (€20,519) in an agreement with the Fortaleza Airport administration for payment of taxes. On 15 August 2017, an Lufthansa MD-11F was sent to the airport with 8.5 tonnes of equipment and 15 Lufthansa Technik mechanics to dismantle the 737. On 21 and 22 September 2017, an An-124 and Il-76, both from Volga-Dnepr Airlines, arrived at Fortaleza. The An-124 carried the wings and fuselage back to Europe, while the Il-76 carried the engines and seats. After a refuelling stop in Cape Verde, both arrived in Friedrichshafen on 23 September 2017, for a total cost of €10 million paid by the Foreign Ministry. Smaller parts and equipment were sent to Germany in two cargo ship containers. Upon arrival, the parts were presented to approximately 4,000 people during a special event. The recovered Landshut aircraft was scheduled to be restored and exhibited by October 2019.

The disassembled plane had since been stored in a hangar at Airplus Maintenance GmbH in Friedrichshafen. The plan to restore and display it in its original 1977 Lufthansa livery was never carried out. Funding issues and questions over competing responsibilities between ministries delayed the project, as did uncertainty over €300,000 in yearly costs. In February 2020, a proposal to transfer the plane parts to Berlin Tempelhof was rejected by the Ministry. After three years in a hangar and with the 737's fate unresolved, David Dornier stepped down in September 2020 as museum director and was replaced by attorney Hans-Peter Rien. He and Culture Minister Monika Grütters (CDU) never agreed on further financing, and the project was placed on hold. By 2023, another hangar was rented, and an opening for an exhibition was planned for 2026.

The federal government looked into whether the aircraft could be exhibited in the Air Force Museum in Berlin-Gatow. The plans did not meet with approval from historians and experts, due to its remote location and lack of connection between the German army and the "Landshut" aircraft. CSU members of the Munich city council proposed bringing the aircraft to Munich, and an application was filed to see if the plane could be exhibited at former Munich Riem Airport. The city highlighted to Culture Minister Grütters the aircraft's connection to Munich, where it had been christened on 7 August 1970 in a Riem Airport hangar in the presence of a large delegation from Landshut. After exactly three years, plans to exhibit the 737 in the Dornier Museum were effectively ended.

The Federal Agency for Civic Education (Bundeszentrale für politische Bildung, bpb) had confirmed in October 2024 that the Landshut display would be relocated to Hall Q, a reconstructed hall in Friedrichshafen. The renovation costs had not been specified, but the monthly rent for the hall, which measures 2,700 square metres (29,000 sq ft) plus nearly 1,700 square metres (18,000 sq ft) of open space, is €47,000. The lease is fixed for 15 years. This rent includes the costs for the now-completed renovations. It was decided that the aircraft, which had been rebuilt several times and mostly used as a cargo plane, would not be restored to its 1977 condition. "The focus is on preserving a special historical object with a varied history," said the Federal Agency for Civic Education. Work was being carried out in Hall Q, adjacent to the Spacetech Arena in Friedrichshafen Airport. The opening of the Learning Place Landshut project for public visits is intended to coincide with the 50th anniversary of the hostage rescue in 2027.

€15 million was made available from the German federal government, in the following allotments:

- €7.5 million:
  - €2.5 million: aircraft maintenance and restoration
  - €2.5 million: hangar reconstruction
  - €1.5 million: provision of technical equipment
  - €1.0 million: implementation of teaching concept
- €7.5 million: operating subsidy for the 10-year period, tied to the requirement to limit museum entrance fees to 5 euros per person

On 22 October 2024, the former Landshut aircraft fuselage was towed from a storage hangar to its display hall about 450 meters away on the grounds of Friedrichshafen Airport. Following this, the fuselage received a cleaning.

In 2026 was said, The "Landshut" exhibition is facing an early end. The government is not providing funding for its continued operation. Because money is tight, the Federal Agency for Civic Education only wants to open the so-called "Learning Place Democracy2" around the wreck of the hijacked plane "Landshut" for half a year. Sönke Rix has been the new president of the Federal Agency for Civic Education (BpB) since March 1st. Instead of continuous operation until 2037, the BpB had planned to run the learning center only from 18th October 2027 to 23 April 2028. The Federal Agency for Civic Education (BpB) had indeed signed a 15-year hangar lease. Since then, approximately €3.3 million had been spent on the "Landshut," including rent, renovations to the hall, and conservation work. An additional €2.7 million is earmarked for the exhibition, which is scheduled for completion in a year and a half. After this the wreck must be scrapped.

The Hangar cost is €47000 per month to tax payers. This is planned until leased the hall April 30, 2029. The so-called learning site operation is secured for at least two years, end of 2029. This was announced by SPD Bundestag member Martin Gerster.

== In popular culture ==
The hijacking and the hostage rescue operation were portrayed in two German television films: Death Game in 1997 and Mogadischu, directed by Roland Suso Richter, in 2008.

The 2015 video game Tom Clancy's Rainbow Six Siege used Lufthansa Flight 181, along with other historical hostage extraction operations, as inspiration for the game and as research for making the game more accurate.

== See also ==
- Operation Entebbe
- List of hostage crises
- Air France Flight 8969
