= CTC =

CTC may refer to:

== Businesses and organisations ==
=== Education ===
- Central Texas College, in Killeen, Texas, U.S.
- Chattahoochee Technical College, Marietta, Georgia, U.S.
- Cincinnati Technical College, later Cincinnati State Technical and Community College, Cincinnati, Ohio, U.S.
- City Technology College, a type of school in England
- Career and Technology Centre, Calgary, Alberta, Canada
- Cornell Theory Center, predecessor to Cornell University Center for Advanced Computing, U.S.

=== Companies ===
- CTC (TV station), a television station in Canberra, Australia
- CTC Media, a Russian independent broadcasting company
- Calcutta Tramways Company, India
- Cambridge Temperature Concepts, a British company
- Canadian Tire, stock ticker CTC
- Canadian Transit Company, owning the Canadian side of the Ambassador Bridge
- CBS Technology Center, the research and development organization of the CBS TV network
- Ceylon Tobacco Company, Sri Lanka
- Chiba Television Broadcasting Corporation, Japan
- Computer Terminal Corporation, later Datapoint
- Crimson Trace Corporation, an American company
- Itochu Techno-Solutions, a Japanese company
- The Contemporary Theater Company, in Rhode Island, U.S.

=== Public bodies ===
- California Transportation Commission, U.S.
- Canadian Tourism Commission, later Destination Canada
- Canadian Transport Commission
- Clermont Transportation Connection, Clermont County, Ohio, U.S.
- Combating Terrorism Center, an American academic institution
- Counter Terrorism Command, of the London Metropolitan Police
- Counterterrorism Center, now Counterterrorism Mission Center, of the CIA
- United Nations Security Council Counter-Terrorism Committee

== Science and technology ==
- Carbon tetrachloride, a halomethane
- Centralized traffic control, a form of railway signalling
- Circulating tumor cell, in the blood
- Closed timelike curve, in general relativity
- Common Toxicity Criteria, later Common Terminology Criteria for Adverse Events, of cancer drugs
- Connectionist temporal classification, a type of neural network output
- Counter/timer channel, a peripheral for the Zilog Z80 microprocessor
- Cucuteni–Trypillia complex, an archaeological complex

== Sports ==
- Central Texas Conference, an American junior college athletic conference with member schools located in Texas that operated from 1933 to 1939
- Cryme Tyme Cenation, a wrestling stable
- Cyclists' Touring Club, also known as Cycling UK
- Royal Calcutta Turf Club, a horse racing organisation
- Canadian Tire Centre, home of the NHL's Ottawa Senators

== Other uses ==
- Canadian Tire Centre, a multi-purpose indoor arena in Ottawa, Ontario, Canada
- Canberra Theatre Centre, a performing arts centre in Canberra, Australia
- Central de Trabajadores de Cuba, the Workers' Central Union of Cuba
- Centro de Tratamento de Correspondência, letter centre of Post of Portugal
- Centre for Terrorism and Counterterrorism, now Institute of Security and Global Affairs (ISGA), The Hague, Netherlands
- Child tax credit, a tax credit for parents with dependent children
- Cinnamon Toast Crunch, a brand of breakfast cereal
- Combat Team Conference, a competition of military and law enforcement special operations units
- Comcast Technology Center, a skyscraper in Philadelphia, United States
- Common Transit Convention, a transport treaty of the European Union
- Communities That Care, program of the U.S. Center for Substance Abuse Prevention
- Confederación de Trabajadores de Colombia, the Confederation of Workers of Colombia
- Continuous transaction control, a method of data collection of governmental bodies
- Cost to company, the total salary package of an employee
- Cracking the Cryptic, a YouTube channel dedicated to paper-and-pencil puzzles
- Crush, tear, curl, a method of processing tea
