= World Challenge =

World Challenge may refer to:

- IAAF World Challenge Meetings
- World Challenge Expeditions, an outdoor education company
- World Challenge (golf), an offseason golf tournament
- GT World Challenge, Continental auto racing series
- SWAT World Challenge, annual competition of law enforcement SWAT teams
- The World Challenge (TV series), 1986 documentary television series
- World Club Challenge, an annual rugby league competition
- World Football Challenge, an exhibitional international club association football competition featuring football clubs from Europe and North America, which has been held since the summer of 2009.
