= GSG 9 =

German Federal Police unit

GSG 9 of the Federal Police
- GSG 9 der Bundespolizei
- GSG 9 badge
- Active: 26 September 1972
- Country: Germany
- Agency: German Federal Police
- Type: Police tactical unit
- Role: Law enforcement; Counter-terrorism
- Operations jurisdiction: National; International
- Part of: Bundespolizeidirektion 11
- Headquarters: Sankt Augustin
- Abbreviation: GSG 9

Structure
- Operators: Approx. 400

Commanders
- Current commander: Colonel (Oberstleutnant) Robert Hemmerling
- Notable commanders: Ulrich Wegener

Notables
- Significant operation(s): Lufthansa Flight 181; Arrest of Birgit Hogefeld, Wolfgang Grams

Website
- Official website

GSG 9 der Bundespolizei (formerly Grenzschutzgruppe 9 (GSG 9, "Border Guard Group 9") of the Bundesgrenzschutz) is the elite police tactical unit of the German Federal Police responsible for counter-terrorism, hostage rescue, and other high-risk operations. It was established in September 1972, only weeks after the failed police rescue attempt during the Munich Olympics hostage crisis, becoming one of the first modern dedicated counter‑terrorism units and a model for similar forces worldwide. GSG 9 gained international prominence after successfully ending the 1977 Lufthansa Flight 181 hijacking in Mogadishu. The unit is headquartered in Sankt Augustin, near Bonn, with an additional base in Berlin, and has been subordinate to Federal Police Directorate 11 since 2017. German state police maintain their own tactical units known as Spezialeinsatzkommando (SEK).

GSG 9 consists of approximately 400 highly trained police officers, whose identities are classified. The unit operates both within Germany at the federal level and abroad to protect German interests, including embassy facilities and personnel. Alongside the Kommando Spezialkräfte (KSK) and Kommando Spezialkräfte der Marine (KSM) of the German Armed Forces (Bundeswehr), GSG 9 may also be tasked with rescuing German citizens in overseas hostage situations.

== Origins ==
On 5 September 1972, Palestinian militants affiliated with Black September infiltrated the Summer Olympic Games in Munich, West Germany. They kidnapped eleven Israeli athletes, killing two during the initial assault on the Olympic Village. The crisis escalated when the Bavarian State Police, who were neither trained nor equipped for counter-terrorism operations and had underestimated the number of militants, attempted a rescue operation. At the time, the police lacked a specialised tactical sniper team, and although the West German Army possessed trained snipers, the West German constitution prohibited the deployment of the armed forces on German soil during peacetime.

The rescue attempt failed, resulting in the deaths of one police officer, five of the eight terrorists, and all nine remaining hostages.

== History ==
As a consequence of the Bavarian State Police's inability to manage the 1972 Munich massacre, the West German government established GSG 9 in September 1972 as a dedicated counter‑terrorism unit within the Bundesgrenzschutz (Federal Border Guard). The unit was created under the command of Lieutenant Colonel (Oberstleutnant) Ulrich Wegener, who had proposed the formation of a specialised federal tactical force. Its establishment was authorised by the Federal Ministry of the Interior under Hans-Dietrich Genscher, to whom Wegener also served as adjutant. GSG 9 became one of the earliest purpose‑built counter‑terrorism units worldwide, intended to ensure that future high‑risk incidents could be handled with appropriate expertise and federal coordination.

Many West German politicians opposed the formation of GSG 9, fearing it would rekindle memories of the Schutzstaffel (SS) and the National Socialists' misuse of military forces for domestic control. To address these concerns, the unit was created within the Federal Border Guard (Bundesgrenzschutz) rather than the West German Army. This differed from Israel's military special operations unit, Sayeret Matkal, which at the time was the only known comparable force with specific counter-terrorism and hostage-rescue experience. Because West German federal law expressly forbade the use of military forces against the civilian population or domestic threats, establishing a police tactical unit composed of highly trained police personnel avoided this issue.

Two weeks after the Munich Olympic massacre, GSG 9 was officially established on 26 September 1972. By April 1973, Wegener reported that the first two sub-units (Teileinheiten) were operationally ready. At the time, GSG 9 was part of the Federal Border Guard (Bundesgrenzschutz, BGS), which was renamed the Federal Police (Bundespolizei) in 2005. The BGS had a paramilitary character, using military ranks until 1976. Its officers held combatant status—initially de facto before 1965, and formally regulated by law from 1965 to 1994. Conscripts were also able to fulfil their compulsory military service by serving in the BGS.

The designation "GSG 9" is derived from the organisational structure of the Federal Border Guard (Bundesgrenzschutz, BGS), which at the time consisted of four border guard commands comprising eight border guard groups (GSG 1–7 and "Sea"). Because the new unit did not fit into any of the existing groups, it was designated Border Guard Group 9 (Grenzschutzgruppe 9, GSG 9).

Since its inception, numerous countries have developed counter‑terrorism units that were trained by or modeled on GSG 9. Examples include Spain's Unidad Especial de Intervención (UEI) of the Civil Guard and India's National Security Guard (NSG), which received training and capability upgrades from GSG 9 following the 2008 Mumbai attacks. Many other countries have also adopted GSG 9 tactics, training methods, and operational concepts to strengthen their own counter‑terrorism capabilities.

=== Name change ===
After the Bundesgrenzschutz was renamed the Bundespolizei in 2005, the abbreviation "GSG 9" was retained due to the unit's established recognition, reflecting the organisational name change rather than any alteration in its role. The current official designation is GSG 9 der Bundespolizei (abbreviated GSG 9 BPOL or simply GSG 9).

== Operations ==
GSG 9 is deployed for counter-terrorism, hostage rescue, and other high-risk law enforcement operations, including responses to kidnapping, extortion, and serious organized crime. An increasing number of arrests carried out by GSG 9 involve cybercrime, which often requires rapid action to secure digital evidence. Deployments related to threats to public safety have also risen. The unit is actively involved in developing and testing new methods and tactics for these missions. In total, GSG 9 conducts approximately 50–60 operations each year.

In contrast to the Spezialeinsatzkommandos (SEK) of the German states, which are trained and equipped for similar missions, GSG 9 operates at the federal level and may only conduct operations within a state's jurisdiction with that state's consent. Federal operations outside the territory of the Federal Republic of Germany likewise require the consent of the foreign nation, such as during rescue missions involving German citizens abroad. Despite the unit's paramilitary characteristics, GSG 9 personnel are strictly limited to policing and tactical intervention roles and may not participate in military hostilities, as they are classified as non‑combatants under international law.

Until 2009, GSG 9 was regularly deployed abroad as part of security details for German embassies in high‑risk regions. The increasing workload from these overseas assignments led to the creation of the PSA BPOL, which assumed responsibility for these protective duties.

From 1972 to 2003, GSG 9 reportedly completed over 1,500 missions, discharging their weapons on only five occasions. At the SWAT World Challenge in 2005, GSG 9 won all eight events, outperforming 17 other teams. They successfully defended their title in 2006 and placed fifth in 2007.

=== Assistance and training of other units ===
Following the successful rescue operation of Lufthansa Flight 181, GSG 9 received numerous requests from foreign governments seeking assistance in training their own special operations units. One example is the consultation provided—alongside other units—during the formation of the US Army's Delta Force. According to information from the Federal Ministry of the Interior (BMI) in 1985, approximately 61 countries maintained training links with GSG 9. Training and support were provided to both friendly and unfriendly states. (Note: Herzog mentioned that unfriendly countries that sought GSG 9 support consisted of countries that don't have good human rights records such as Egypt, Indonesia, Thailand and Turkey.)

An agreement between the BMI and the Singaporean Ministry of Defence allowed for the deployment of GSG 9 personnel to Singapore from 1980 in situations where their intervention was deemed necessary. This arrangement followed GSG 9's assistance in establishing anti‑terrorism capabilities within the Singaporean armed forces.

Germany offered assistance to India in the aftermath of the November 2008 Mumbai attacks. GSG 9 helped train and upgrade the National Security Guard (NSG), India's primary counter‑terrorism unit. Additional support was provided to the Mumbai Police to aid in the creation of a dedicated police tactical unit.

The suspected involvement of retired GSG 9 operators in training Libyan security forces in 2008 drew significant criticism in German media. GSG 9's assistance in training Belarusian security forces between 2008 to 2011 was also heavily criticized.

In 2015, GSG 9 began training the specialised "BFE+" operators of the Federal Police's arrest units.

== Missions ==
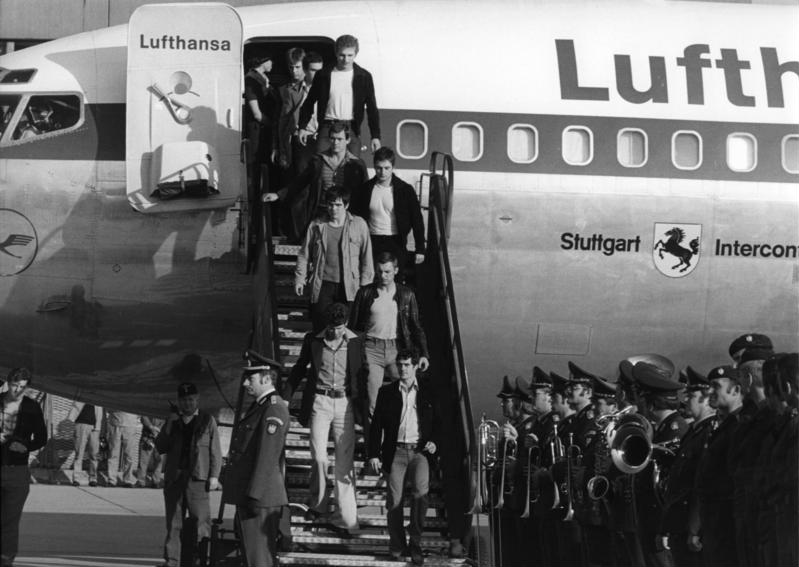
After the successful hostage rescue operation on Lufthansa Flight 181 at Mogadishu International Airport in 1977, a special aircraft carrying State Minister Hans-Jürgen Wischnewski and the GSG 9 commandos return to Cologne Bonn Airport.

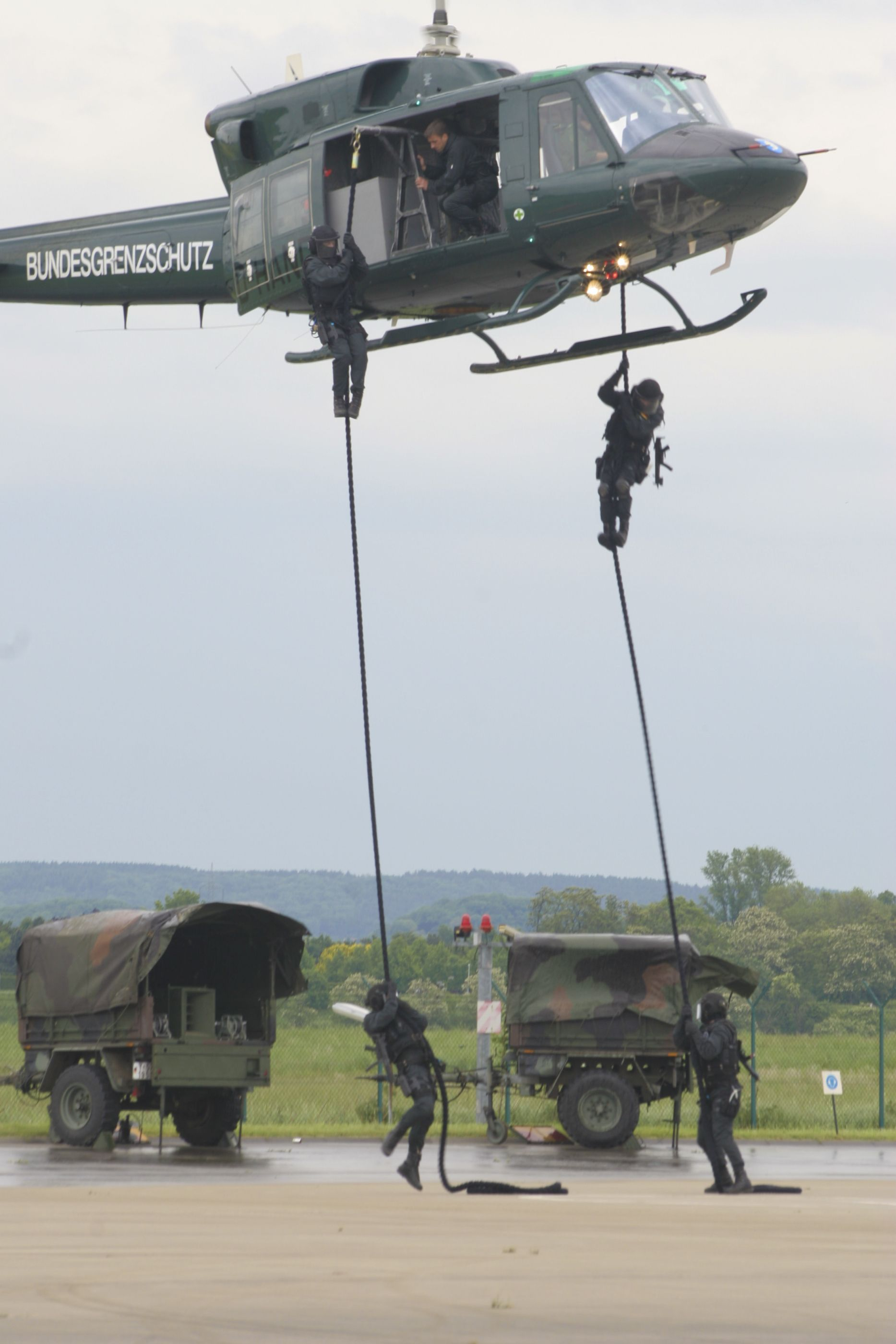
A GSG 9 exercise in 2005

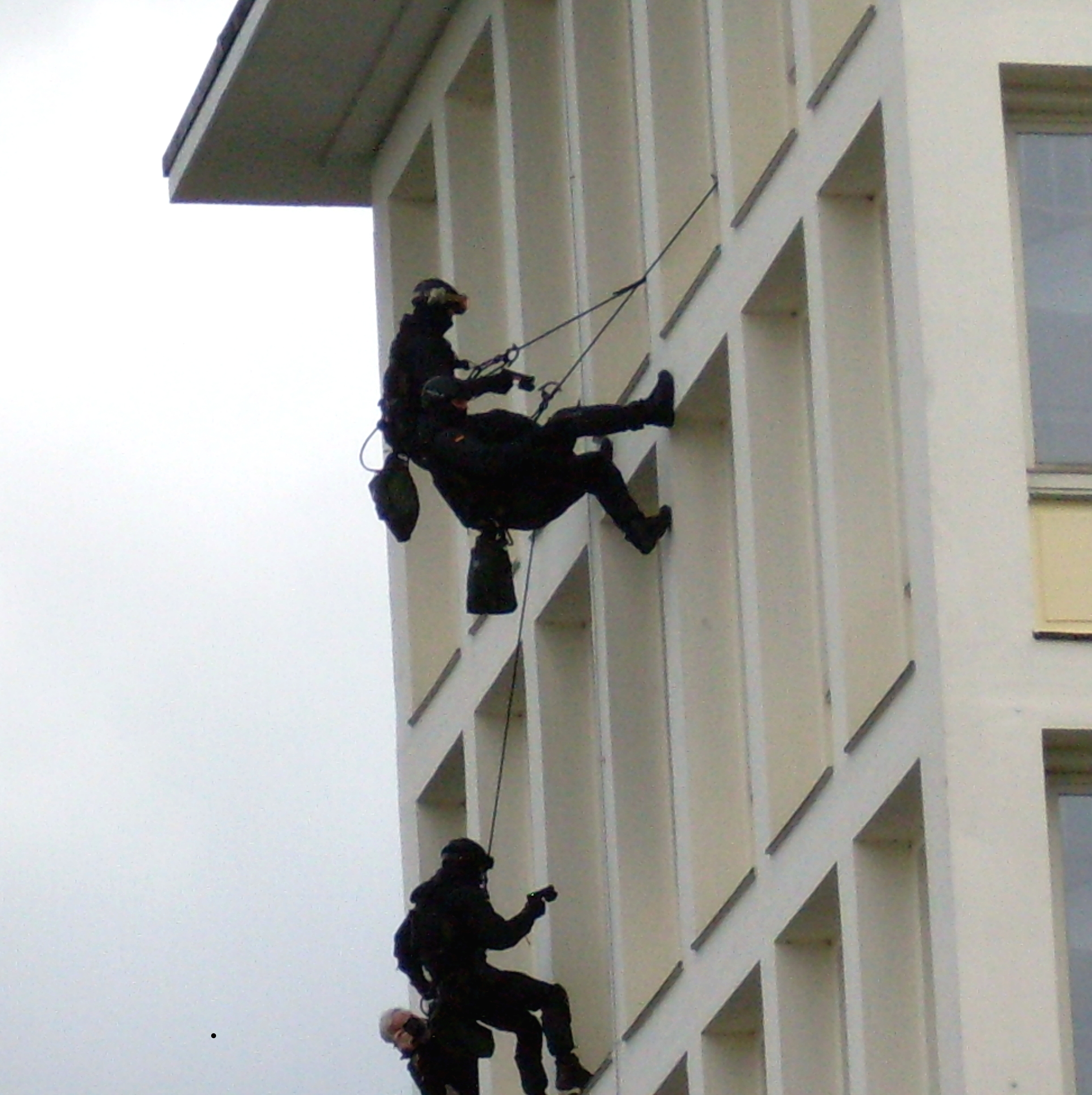
GSG 9 operators rappel on a building of the German Bundeskriminalamt.

Its first mission, "Operation Feuerzauber" ("Magic Fire"), immediately established GSG 9's reputation as an elite counter‑terrorism and hostage-rescue unit. The operation took place in 1977 after Palestinian militants hijacked Landshut, a Lufthansa aircraft travelling from Palma de Mallorca to Frankfurt. The hijackers demanded the release of imprisoned members of the Red Army Faction in exchange for the passengers and crew. The aircraft was flown to several destinations across the Middle East, during which the Lufthansa captain, Jürgen Schumann, was murdered by the leader of the hijackers in Aden.

However, West German Chancellor Helmut Schmidt negotiated an agreement with Somali President Siad Barre that allowed the West German tactical unit GSG 9 to take control of the crisis and storm the aircraft. Special envoy Hans-Jürgen Wischnewski and GSG 9 commander Ulrich Wegener travelled to Mogadishu with approximately 60 GSG 9 commandos, organised into two assault elements.

After a four‑day odyssey, the hijackers directed the Boeing 737 to Mogadishu, Somalia, where they awaited the arrival of the Red Army Faction prisoners following a false signal from the German government that they would be released. On the night of 17–18 October, Somali ranger units created a diversion while GSG 9 operators stormed the aircraft.

The assault lasted seven minutes and resulted in the successful rescue of all hostages. Three hijackers were killed and the fourth critically wounded. Only one GSG 9 operator and one flight attendant sustained minor injuries. The operation was widely praised within the international counter‑terrorism community, as aircraft assaults are regarded as among the most complex and hazardous forms of hostage‑rescue missions.

=== Publicly known missions ===
- 13–18 October 1977: Lufthansa Flight 181 was hijacked by four Palestinian militants demanding the release of imprisoned Red Army Faction (RAF) members. After a multi‑day odyssey through the Middle East, GSG 9 operators stormed the aircraft on the ground in Mogadishu, Somalia, rescuing all 87 hostages and four of the five crew members. Three hijackers were killed and the fourth was captured with critical injuries.
- 1982: Arrest of RAF militants Brigitte Mohnhaupt and Adelheid Schulz.
- 27 June 1993: Arrest of RAF militants Birgit Hogefeld and Wolfgang Grams in Bad Kleinen. The theory that Wolfgang Grams was executed in revenge for the death of GSG 9 operative Michael Newrzella during the mission (Grams had shot and killed Newrzella when Newrzella tried to tackle him) was discredited by the official investigation which found that Grams committed suicide.
- 1993: Ending of the hijacking of a KLM flight from Tunis to Amsterdam, redirected to Düsseldorf, without firing a single shot.
- 1994: Ended a hostage situation in the Kassel Penitentiary.
- 1994: Involved in the search for the kidnappers Albert and Polak.
- 1998: Arrest of a man trying to extort money from the German railway company Deutsche Bahn.
- 1999: Arrest of Metin Kaplan in Cologne.
- 1999: Arrest of two suspected members of the Revolutionäre Zellen (Revolutionary Cells) in Berlin.
- 1999: Involved in ending the hostage situation in the central bank in Aachen.
- 2000: Advised the Philippines in relation to a hostage situation.
- 2001: Arrested two spies in Heidelberg.
- 2001: Assisted in the liberation of four German tourists in Egypt.
- 2002: Arrested a number of suspects related to the September 11, 2001 attacks.
- 2003: Protection of the four members of the German Technisches Hilfswerk (THW – the civil protection organization of Germany) in Baghdad, Iraq. The THW's mission was to repair the water distribution system.
- 2004: GSG 9 is responsible for protecting German embassy property and personnel, including the embassy in Baghdad, Iraq. On 7 April 2004, two members were attacked and killed near Fallujah while in a convoy traveling from Amman, Jordan to Baghdad. The men, aged 25 and 38, were traveling in a car at the rear of the convoy and therefore received most of the enemy fire after passing the ambush. The men were shot after their armored Mitsubishi Pajero/Shogun was hit and stopped by RPGs. In a later statement, the attackers apologized for mistaking the German convoy for an American convoy. One of the bodies is still missing.
- 2007: Three suspected terrorists were seized on Tuesday, 4 September 2007 for planning huge bomb attacks on targets in Germany. The bombs they were planning to make would have had more explosive power than those used in the Madrid and London terror attacks. They wanted to build a bomb in southern Germany capable of killing as many as possible. Fritz Gelowicz, 29, Adem Yilmaz, 29, and Daniel Schneider, 22, were charged with membership in a terrorist organization, making preparations for a crime involving explosives, and, in Schneider's case, attempted murder.
- 2009: The GSG 9 were on the verge of boarding a German freighter, the MV Hansa Stavanger, which had been hijacked by Somali pirates. The case of the Hansa Stavanger, at this time off the Somali coast seemed sufficiently symbolic to justify another potentially successful rescue operation, though on a much larger scale. More than 200 GSG 9, equipped with helicopters, speedboats, and advanced weapons, had been secretly brought, via Kenya, to a location 80 kilometres (50 mi) from the German freighter. The United States Navy helicopter carrier USS Boxer was lent to the Germans to act as their flagship, and a screen of German Navy warships flanked the Boxer. The ships had been patrolling near the Hansa Stavanger for days, waiting at a distance to evade detection on the pirates' radar screens. But the operation was called off before the rescue effort could begin. US National Security Advisor James L. Jones had called the Chancellery to cancel the operation. The US government, worried that the operation could turn into a suicide mission, was sending the USS Boxer back to the Kenyan port of Mombasa, where the German forces were to disembark. Officials at the German Federal Police headquarters in Potsdam, outside Berlin, concerned about the potential for a bloodbath, had also spoken out against the operation.
- 2012: GSG 9 was involved in a raid on the Hanover Hells Angels chapter leader Frank Hanebuth's house, as part of a crackdown on the group. During the raid, they knocked down the wooden gate and rappelled from a helicopter onto his residence. They are also reported to have shot a dog on the premises belonging to Hanebuth.
- 2016: GSG 9 was deployed to assist with the 2016 Munich shooting.
- 2021: GSG 9 was participating in the search for Jürgen Conings, Belgium.
- 2022: GSG 9 units were involved in raids to arrest members of the Reichsbürger movement suspected of plotting to overthrow the German government.

The majority of GSG 9's missions are classified, and only limited information is publicly available. Since its formation, the unit has taken part in more than 1,500 operations, yet reportedly discharged firearms on only five occasions (official count prior to the 2003 Iraq War). These incidents include the 1977 Mogadishu hostage rescue, the 1993 GSG 9 Bad Kleinen operation, the 1999 Aachen hostage crisis, and two additional cases in which shots were fired to neutralise aggressive dogs during arrest operations, including one incident during a raid on the residence of Hanover Hells Angels chapter leader Frank Hanebuth.

== Organization ==
GSG 9 is part of the German Bundespolizei (Federal Police, formerly Bundesgrenzschutz) and therefore holds standard police powers, including the authority to make arrests. The Federal Police, and by extension GSG 9, fall under the jurisdiction of the Federal Ministry of the Interior. The Bundespolizei also provides the unit with aerial transport capabilities. In spring 1973, GSG 9 was authorised to wear a green beret.

On 1 August 2017, GSG 9 was reassigned to Federal Police Directorate 11, which was created as the central command authority for all special operations units of the German Federal Police.

=== Personnel and stations ===
After a reorganisation process, GSG 9's component was divided into four sub‑units known as Einsatzeinheiten (Operational Units). Each unit is capable of conducting the full spectrum of GSG 9 missions, including responses to terrorism, hostage‑taking, serious violent crime, bomb threats, kidnapping, and extortion. They may also be deployed to secure locations, neutralise dangerous individuals, conduct precision marksmanship tasks, and track fugitives.

Three of the four units are further specialised in the following fields:

1st Operational Unit
Sniping.
2nd Operational Unit
Diving and maritime operations, for example, the hijacking of ships or oil platforms.
3rd Operational Unit
Airborne operations, including parachuting and helicopter landings.
4th Operational Unit
Based in Berlin and is primarily tasked with police operations in the capital, with a particular emphasis on urban‑environment counter‑terrorism scenarios, including attacks similar to the November 2015 Paris attacks. In 2017, GSG 9 announced that one of its counter-terrorism elements would receive specialised training for CBRN (chemical, biological, radiological, and nuclear) incidents. In 2018, it was further reported that additional personnel were being recruited to strengthen the unit's ability to respond to complex counter‑terrorism situations in the city.

The operational units are supported by various support elements, which include:

OEM "Operative Einsatz Medizin"
The "Operative Einsatz Medizin" is a group of specialized combat Medics who deploy to the field for rescue and care for operators, hostages, or civilians. A comparable German unit exists only in the German Air Force, Kampfretter. The motto of the OEM is: "Servare Vitas". OEM also has combat doctors who can make for example surgeries in the field.
Central services
This service group maintains the GSG 9 armory and is involved in testing, repairing, and purchasing weapons, ammunition, and explosives.
Documentation unit
This unit handles communications, including the testing, repairing, and purchasing of communications and surveillance equipment.
Operations staff
Handles the administration of GSG 9.
Technical unit
This unit supports other units in gaining entry to target areas and is responsible for the procurement, testing, and issuance of non-weapon equipment. The members of the technical unit are also explosive ordnance disposal experts and they are cross-trained in direct action operations. They are trained in the rendering safe and disposal of improvised explosive devices
Training unit
This unit trains existing members, selects recruits, and trains new members.

=== Headquarters ===
The GSG 9 is headquartered in Sankt Augustin near Bonn. Since 2018, a second base has been established in Berlin to host one of the unit's operational elements, reducing response times for missions in the capital and the surrounding region.

=== Commanders ===
The respective commanders of GSG 9 are the only members whose identities are publicly disclosed. All commanders have previously served as active operators within the unit:

- 1972–1980: Ulrich Wegener — founder and first commander
- 1980–1982: Klaus Blätte — originally served as deputy commander under Wegener at the unit's inception
- 1982–1991: Uwe Dee
- 1991–1997: Jürgen Bischoff
- 1997–2005: Friedrich Eichele
- 2005–2014: Olaf Lindner
- 2014–2023: Jérôme Fuchs (Since August 10, 2023, Vice President of Federal Police Directorate 11)
- since 2023: Robert Hemmerling

== Recruitment and training ==
Members of the Bundespolizei and the police forces of the German states (Landespolizei) who are not older than 34 years and have completed the full two‑ to three‑year police training or degree programme for the mittlerer or gehobener Polizeivollzugsdienst (intermediate or upper police career group) are eligible to apply for the GSG 9 selection process. Eligibility is therefore based on the successful completion of this training rather than a fixed minimum number of service years. Members can serve in GSG 9 until the age of 45.

=== Selection ===
Candidates for GSG 9 complete a five‑day Eignungs‑ und Auswahlverfahren (aptitude and selection process) before acceptance into the training cycle. This phase includes medical examinations conducted by police medical examiners, psychological and cognitive evaluations, firearms‑proficiency assessments, oral interviews, and a physical fitness test, which includes:

- Cooper test
- 100 metres sprint
- Standing long jump
- A minimum of ten pull-ups
- Bench press: Minimum of ten repetitions of 75% of the candidate's body weight
- Obstacle course
- Agility test
- Resistance test against vertigo

Approximately 10-15% of all candidates pass the selection phase and are accepted into the basic training section.

=== Basic training and specialisation ===
The subsequent 10-month training period includes both basic and specialized training. The basic phase lasts approximately four months and prepares candidates for their duties as GSG 9 operators. It includes marksmanship, tactical courses, close‑quarter combat, land navigation, climbing, rappelling, and medical training. This is followed by a "hardship week," during which candidates are tested under extreme physical and mental stress.

The specialized training phase corresponds to the candidate’s planned tactical assignment within the unit and concludes with a final career‑qualification examination. Upon successful completion of all training stages, candidates are awarded the GSG 9 qualification badge and assigned to one of the operational units as a "Special Operations Officer."

In addition to the formal training pipeline, operators receive further qualifications tailored to their intended operational roles. These may include parachuting, maritime operations, advanced marksmanship, advanced medical skills, surveillance (police investigation), operational diving, military freefall parachuting (conducted at the Airborne and Air Transport School), or explosive ordnance disposal (EOD) techniques.

Individual GSG 9 officers have also participated in training courses conducted by the German Army's Special Operations Forces Command (KSK). These courses, held between 2007 and 2012, included specialized training in parachuting as well as breaching and demolition.

Further training often involves cooperation with other allied counter-terrorism units, such as Israel's Yamam, France’s Groupe d'intervention de la Gendarmerie nationale (GIGN) or National Gendarmerie Intervention Group, and the Federal Bureau of Investigation's Hostage Rescue Team from the United States.

== Equipment ==
The GSG 9 are equipped with the following:

=== Weapons ===
- Smith & Wesson Model 19
- Smith & Wesson Model 66
- Heckler & Koch P7
- Heckler & Koch USP
- Heckler & Koch MP5/MP5K/MP5SD
- Heckler & Koch MP7
- Heckler & Koch HK512
- Heckler & Koch PSG-1
- Mauser SP66 (Note: Tophoven reported that the weapon's name is the M66.)
- Heckler & Koch G3SG/1
- Heckler & Koch G8
- Heckler & Koch MZP1
- Glock 17
- SIG Sauer P226
- Remington Model 870
- Heckler & Koch G36C
- Heckler & Koch HK416
- Heckler & Koch HK417
- Heckler & Koch AG36
- Barrett M82A1
- PGM Hécate
- DSR-Precision DSR-1
- Haenel RS9

=== Equipment ===
- PSH-77
- Bristol body armor
- Ops Core Helmet
- Lindnerhof Taktik plate carrier
- OD Crye clothes
- Black Crye clothes
- Black Arc'teryx clothes
- OD/Multicam plate carriers

=== Vehicles ===
==== Ground ====
- Mercedes Benz 280 SE
- Mercedes Benz W123
- Mercedes-Benz 280 GE (Armored variant)
- Daimler-Benz 1017A (Communications)
- TM-170

==== Aerial ====
- Aérospatiale Alouette II
- Bell UH-1D
- Aérospatiale SA 330 Puma

== Associations ==
- GSG 9 is a member of the ATLAS Network.
- In 1975, the health resort municipality of Bischofsgrün in the Fichtel Mountains, Bavaria, became the sponsoring community (Patenschaft) responsible for the duty of care of GSG 9.
- Since 1983, GSG 9 has hosted the Combat Team Conference (CTC) every four years. The CTC is a competition for international special forces units.
- The GSG 9 Kameradschaft e.V. in Sankt Augustin is an association for former GSG 9 operators.
- Along with the German Armed Forces (including the Special Forces Command and the Marine Special Forces Command) and the Federal Criminal Police Office, GSG 9 regularly cooperates within the framework of the "Expert Group for the Solution of Hostage-Taking and Kidnappings Abroad" (EG GE).

== Annual Warrior Competition ==
GSG 9 won the 2012 Annual Warrior Competition, defeating the defending 2011 champion, EKO Cobra.

== See also ==
- Diensteinheit IX – East Germany's equivalent unit
- GIGN - French equivalent
- EKO Cobra - Austrian Equivalent
- GEO - Spanish equivalent
- Public Security Section 9 – fictional Japanese variant inspired/based on GSG 9
- Hostage Rescue Team American equivalent

== Bibliography ==
- Herzog, Martin (2025). GSG 9: From Munich to Mogadishu - The Birth of Germany's Counterterrorism Force. Casemate. ISBN 978-1636245720.
- Neville, Rolf (2017). European Counter-Terrorist Units: 1972–2017. Osprey Publishing. ISBN 978-1472825292.
- Tophoven, Rolf (1984). GSG 9: German response to terrorism. Bernard & Graefe Verlag. ISBN 978-3763750887.
