= BKA ASE =

German police unit

Missions Abroad and Special Operations
- Auslands- und Spezialeinsätze (German)
- Active: 2008–present
- Country: Germany
- Agency: Federal Criminal Police Office
- Type: Police tactical unit
- Role: Close protection
- Headquarters: Berlin
- Abbreviation: ASE

The Missions Abroad and Special Operations (in German: Auslands- und Spezialeinsätze, abbreviated BKA-ASE) is a specialized unit within the German Federal Criminal Police Office (BKA) composed of specially selected and trained BKA personnel that typically operate in high-threat environments.

== History ==
=== Background and creation ===
On August 15, 2007, three BKA agents who served as part of the security detail of the German Ambassador to Afghanistan were killed. The incident proved that the personnel conducting these tasks were not appropriately trained and prepared to face the threat of attacks which became increasingly complex. This led to dramatic changes of the protection of the diplomatic missions in hazardous areas.

The Federal Police tasked their special security details for diplomatic missions of protecting embassies and their personnel while the BKA saw the need of establishing a similar unit to operate in hostile environments. The BKA's protection division has drawn from the experiences of previous deployments of security details which showed the need of military-style tactics, equipment and training.

Selected agents of the BKA were trained by the German Military's special operations unit KSK and the ASE became fully operational in 2008. Until this day, BKA ASE maintains strong relationships with similar domestic and international special operations units

=== Controversy ===
On 20 April 2021, the President of the BKA published a statement regarding ongoing investigations against members of the ASE.

In different cases, legal and disciplinary investigations were initiated due to various cases of misconduct.

== Mission ==
=== Tasks ===
- ASE may operate as close protection details in hazardous areas.
- Functions as counter assault teams. In the event a VIP, the VIP's vehicle, or a protected site is attacked or ambushed by armed assailants, ASE operators may be tasked with engaging and diverting the attackers, thereby buying the close protection shift time to evacuate the dignitary to a safe area.
- Tasked with the protection of German constitutional organs of the federal government such as the German President, Bundeskanzler and Ministers during their visits to foreign crisis regions.
- Provides tactical support to foreign high-profile state guests during their stay in Germany.
- Provides high-risk escort of witnesses within the witness protection tasks of the BKA and the escort of high-profile and dangerous prisoners.

ASE operates closely with the close protection details of the BKA or with other special units of the German Police such as the protection unit for German Diplomatic Missions.

=== Deployments ===
Since its establishment, the ASE has engaged in over 200 missions (as of 2019), in nations such as Iraq, Mali, Pakistan, Israel, Lebanon, Yemen, Nigeria, Libya, Somalia among others.

Recent domestic deployments include the International Conference on Afghanistan, Bonn (2011), the 41st G7 summit in Bavaria and the 2017 G20 Hamburg summit.

== Organisation ==
ASE is a sub-section of the BKA Protection Division in Berlin. It is composed of elite members of the BKA Protection Division chosen through a highly competitive and selective process.

The unit is subdivided in two operational teams: ASE Alpha and ASE Bravo.

== Selection and training ==
Members of the BKA and other German police services can apply for the selection process of the ASE.

During the selection process candidates have to complete the following tests

- Physical fitness which includes a 3000 m run, benchpress and an obstacle course
- Marksmanship and weapons handling
- Self-defense and hand-to-hand fighting
- Psychological examinations
- Oral interviews

Upon successful completion of the selection phase, ASE operators attend the standard personal security detail training by the BKA's Protection Division and further specialization courses.

These involve advanced firearm handling, combatives, tactics in high-threat environments or advanced medical training.

== Equipment ==
=== Weaponry ===
Name	Country of origin	Type	Notes
SIG Sauer P229	Germany	Semi-automatic pistol	
Heckler & Koch MP5	Germany	Submachine gun	
Heckler & Koch MP7	Germany	Submachine gun	
Heckler & Koch G36	Germany	Assault rifle	

=== Personal equipment ===
Further equipment depends on the theater and may include night vision goggles, plate carriers and ballistic helmets or ballistic shields. Depending on the mission ASE operators are usually dressed in low-profile civilian attire or in khaki battle dress uniforms.

=== Vehicles ===
- Mercedes-Benz G-Class
- Armoured vehicles

The BKA does not have its own air assets so ASE operators use capabilities of the German Federal Police's aviation unit.

== See also ==
- PSA BPOL
- DSS Mobile Security Deployments
- Secret Service Counter Assault Team
