= Bundespolizeidirektion 11 =

German sub-authority of the Federal Police

Federal Police Directorate 11
- Bundespolizeidirektion 11
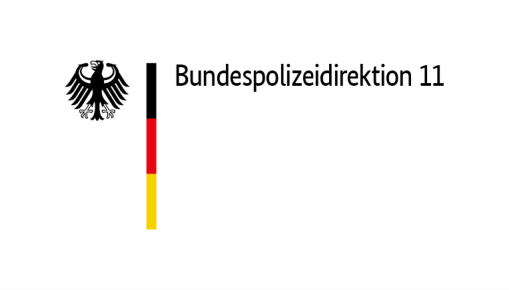
- Bundespolizeidirektion 11 logo
- Active: 2017–present
- Country: Germany
- Agency: German Federal Police
- Type: Special Police Forces Unified Command
- Part of: German Federal Police Headquarters
- Headquarters: Former Royal Railway Directorate, Schöneberger Ufer 1–3 Berlin
- Abbreviation: BPOLD 11

Commanders
- Current commander: Olaf Lindner

Notables
- Anniversaries: 1 August

Website
- www.bundespolizei.de/Web/DE/05Die-Bundespolizei/03Organisation/02Direktionen/11/d11_node.html

Bundespolizeidirektion 11 or BPOLD 11 (English: Federal Police Directorate 11) is the unified command of the units with special tasks of the German Federal Police.

== History ==
Following the September 11 attacks in 2001 the then Federal Border Guard of Germany developed its first plans for a Special Forces Directorate which was further developed after the 2004 Madrid train bombings and the 7 July 2005 London bombings. Following further terrorist attacks in central Europe, including Germany, the establishment of the Federal Police Directorate 11 was decided amongst other measures which were aimed on strengthening the German Police forces.
Personnel was drawn from various agencies in Germany tasked with policing or intelligence tasks, such as the Federal Criminal Police Office, or the Federal Office for the Protection of the Constitution.

== Organization and tasks ==
The Directorate 11 was established on August 1, 2017 in order to improve the coordination among all specialised units of the Federal Police. This encompasses all units who are tasked with dealing with terrorist threats, organised crime and complex large scale attacks.

- GSG9
- Federal Police Air Service
- PSA BPOL
- Special Protection Tasks Aviation (sky marshals)
- Federal Police Operation and Investigation Support

The German police's centers for research and development in the field of explosive ordnance disposal and IED disposal and the use of unmanned aerial vehicles are also subordinate to the Directorate 11.

The Directorate 11 is headed by Olaf Lindner, former commander of the GSG9.

== Notable operations ==
- Support of FRONTEX's border guard operations between Spain and Morocco, Greece and Turkey.
