= 2016 bombing of the German consulate in Mazar-i-Sharif =

Taliban attack in Afghanistan

Bombing of the German consulate at Mazar-i-Sharif
- Part of War in Afghanistan
- Location: Mazar-i-Sharif, Afghanistan
- Date: 10 November 2016; 23:05 (UTC+04:30)
- Target: German consulate
- Attack type: Truck bombing, suicide attack
- Deaths: 6 (+2 bombers)
- Injuries: 129
- Perpetrator: Taliban

A group of three suicide attackers rammed a truck bomb into the wall of the German consulate in Mazar-i-Sharif, Afghanistan on 10 November 2016. Six people were killed (as well as two of the bombers) and more than 120 others were injured, while the sole remaining attacker was captured by Afghan security forces. The Taliban claimed responsibility for the attack and Taliban spokesman Zabihullah Mujahid said the bombing was in retaliation for an airstrike in Kunduz that killed 30 civilians the week before.

== Event ==
At about 23:05 local time, a suicide bomber rammed a truck into the side of the German consulate. The truck exploded, killing six people and injuring dozens of others. After the bombing, armed terrorists entered the compound. PSA of the German Federal Police protected the German diplomatic staff and held strong points in the building against the terrorist assault. Later, German KSK and Kampfretter were able to secure pathways to them and enable safe evacuation of the civilian personnel. This was the first combat mission of the Kampfretter, the PSA's most severe firefight, and the first time those special(ized) forces fought side by side.

The Resolute Support Mission troops were deployed to the scene to investigate. It is possible that two bombs were involved as the damage to the consulate was so extensive that it is unlikely one bomb could have caused it.
