= Arrest unit =

German special police unit

Evidence and arrest units (German: Beweissicherungs- und Festnahmeeinheiten, lit. 'Units for arrests and securing evidence', abbreviated BFE or BFHu) are specialized units of the German state police forces and the Federal Police.

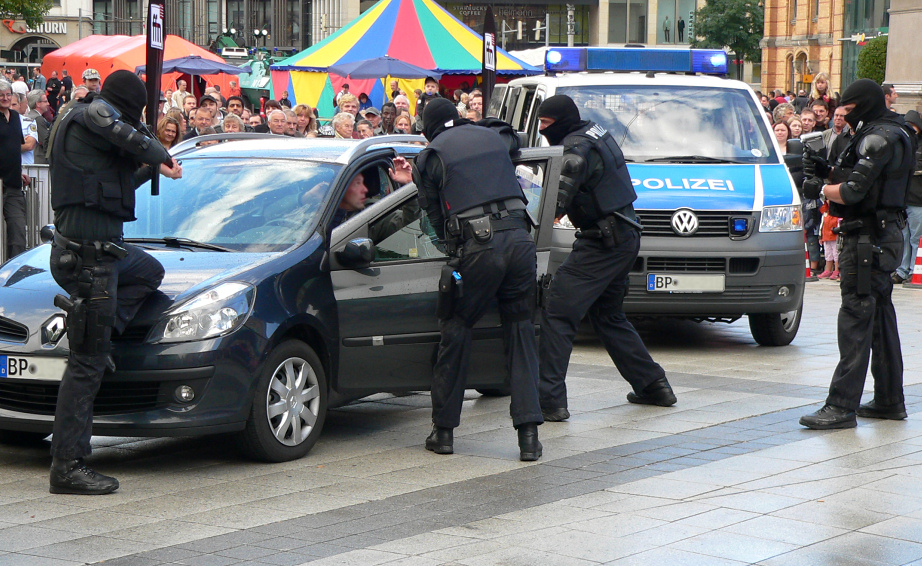
A BFE unit of the German Federal Police demonstrates an arrest during a police show in Hannover.

== History ==
The BFEs were established in 1987 after the deaths of two police officers during the demonstrations against the expansion of Frankfurt Airport.

As a consequence from the terrorist attacks in Paris 2015, each of the five BFE units of the Federal Police was tasked with enhancing one of its squads to a BFE+ unit. The purpose of the BFE+ units is to close the gap between the regular BFE units and the GSG 9, thus reducing the response time and workload for the GSG 9 or the SEK units.

BFE+ personnel are trained in a 12-week course by the GSG 9 in special tactics and skills which may be required to deal with threats similar to the Charlie Hebdo attack or the November 2015 Paris attacks.

Notable operations of BFE+ include high risk arrests in the course of investigations against a Syrian human trafficking network or riot control during the 2017 G20 Hamburg summit.

== Organization ==
BFE units are generally part of the Bereitschaftspolizei police support groups and their structure may vary between the different state police forces. A sample structure may look like this:

- Command: four officers
- Technical support: four officers
- Securing evidence: six officers
- Six arrest teams: five officers per team

== Duties ==
- Riot control
- Providing assistance on high-risk warrants
- Obtaining evidence of criminal acts during large events such as soccer games or demonstrations

== Equipment ==
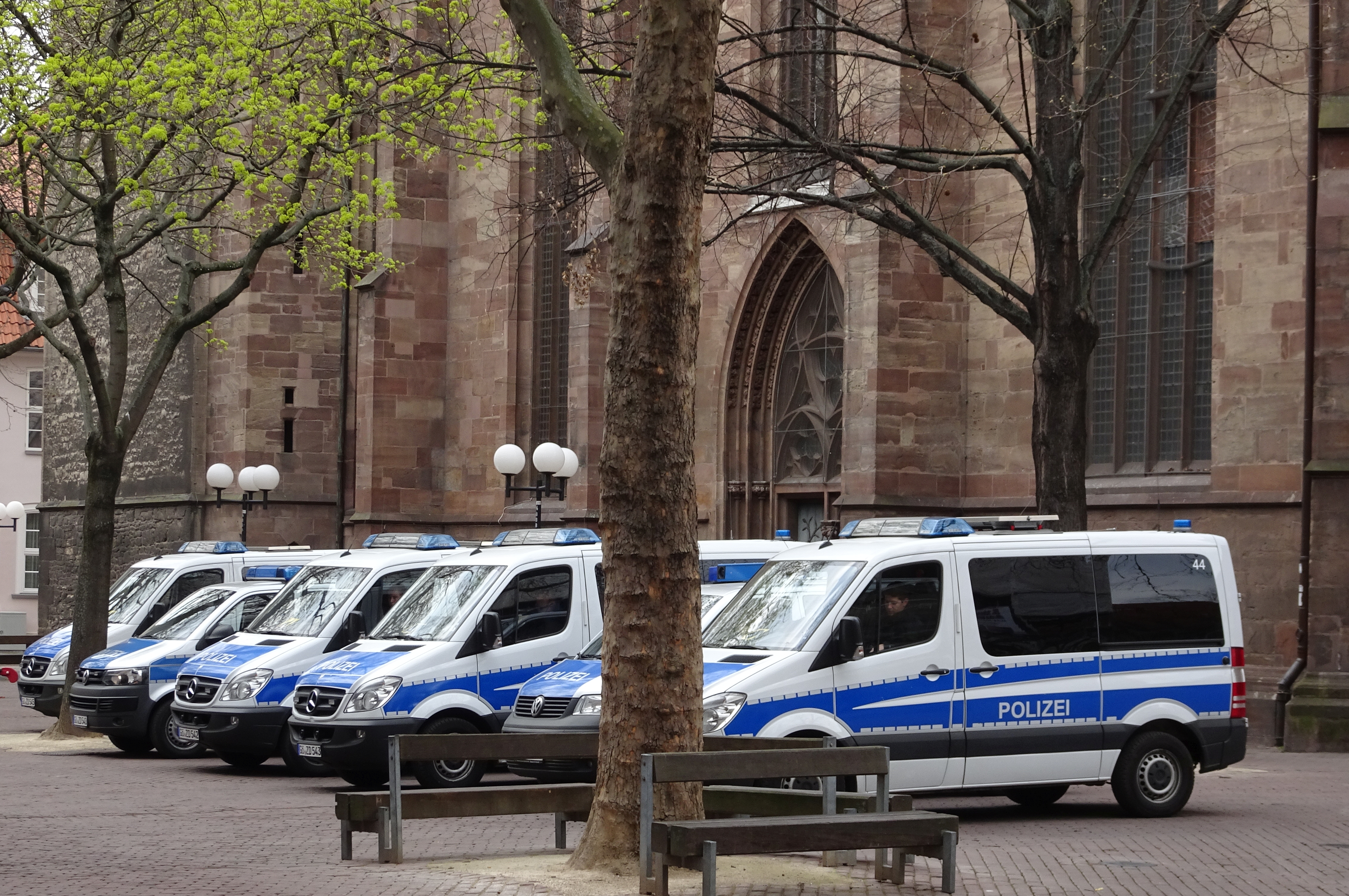
The BFE have favoured the Mercedes-Benz Sprinter and Mercedes-Benz Vito.

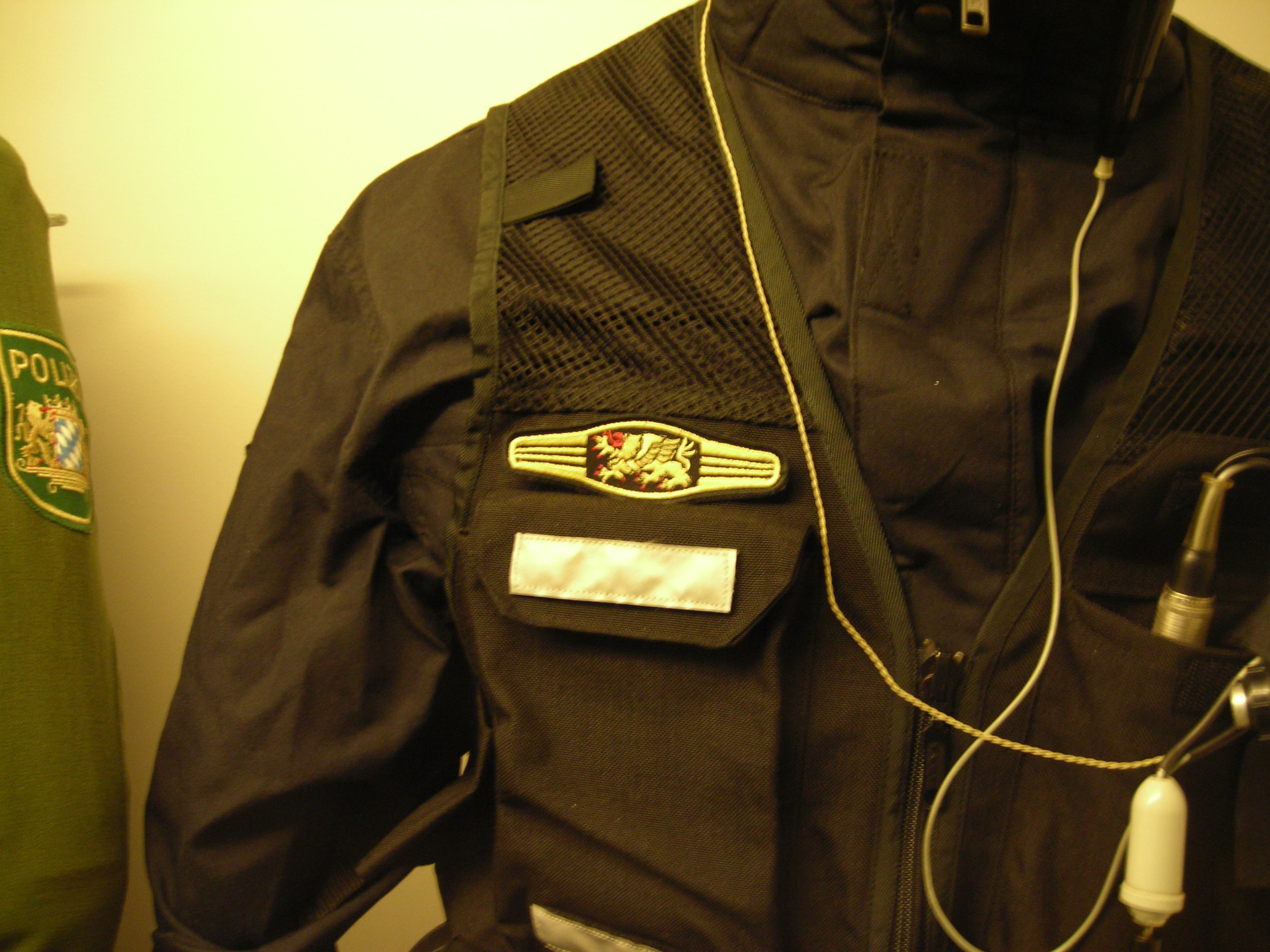
Uniform of member of an arrest unit of the Bavarian Police.

Due to their duties in dangerous environments, the BFE units are often equipped with special equipment which may include:

=== Special equipment ===
- Breaching tools
- Still and video cameras
- Portable fire extinguishers
- Crowbars and battering rams

=== Weapons ===
- Tonfa or collapsible batons
- Maces and other non-lethal weaponry
- Sidearms
- Submachine guns
- HK G36K (BFE+)

=== Uniforms ===
- Ballistic vests
- Combat Uniform (mainly UF PRO Striker XT Grey)
- Riot gear
- Fire-resistant clothing

The arrest units (German: Unterstützungskommandos, abbreviated USK) of the Police of the State of Bavaria wear special uniforms to distinguish themselves from the regular police units. The arrest units wear black uniforms with specialized assignment patches while regular units wear dark blue uniforms.

== See also ==
- Snatch squad
