= Frank Hanebuth =

German brothel owner and biker (born 1964)

- Born: Frank Armin Hanebuth; 21 September 1964 (age 62); Garbsen-Osterwald, West Germany
- Occupations: Outlaw biker; crime boss; pimp; professional boxer
- Allegiance: Bones MC (1995–1999); Hells Angels MC (1999–)
- Conviction: Assault causing serious bodily harm (2001)

Frank Armin Hanebuth (born 21 September 1964) is a German outlaw biker, professional boxer and alleged gangster. Hanebuth has been described in the media as the boss of all the Hells Angels in Europe.

== Biker ==
Hanebuth was born into a middle-class family in Garbsen-Osterwald, but grew up in Hanover, the capital of the Lower Saxony land (state). Initially trained as a carpenter, Hanebuth instead worked as a pimp (prostitution is legal in Germany). Hanebuth worked in the Steintorviertel, the red light district of Hanover. Between 1991 and 1996, Hanebuth worked as a professional boxer. In 1995, he joined the Bones Motorcycle Club and became president of its Hanover chapter. In 1999, he joined the Hells Angels. The Hanover chapter became the richest and most powerful Hells Angels chapter in Germany.

=== Criminal allegations in Germany ===
In 2000, Hanebuth was arrested on charges of attempting to set up brothels in the Free City of Hamburg. Hanebuth was convicted in Hamburg in 2001 of assault causing serious bodily harm and spent 3 years in prison. After his release, Hanebuth focused his activities to Hanover and was described as being the driving force behind the Hells Angels expansion in Germany. Since the early years of this century, Hanebuth has been widely respected for his "pacification" of the Steintorviertel, which was previously fought over by rival Albanian, Russian and Turkish gangsters. Newspapers such as Hannoversche Allgemeine Zeitung and the Neue Presse have given Hanebuth much favorable coverage, portraying him as a “refined person” and a “respected man”. Through his lawyer, Goetz-Werner von Fromberg, Hanebuth has built close connections with the business and political elites of Hanover. The journalist Christine Kröger, the crime correspondent of the Bremen Weser-Kurier newspaper, has written a number of stories exposing Hanebuth's links to the elites of Hanover.

On 24 May 2012, officers from the State Criminal Police Office of Lower Saxony and GSG 9 searched Hanebuth's property in Wedemark as part of a raid. In April 2013, almost a year after the search of his house, the public prosecutor's office in Kiel dropped the investigation into suspected contract killings alleged to have been ordered by Hanebuth due to insufficient evidence. Hanebuth relocated to Mallorca, where he became the president of the local Hells Angels chapter.

=== Criminal allegations in Spain ===
Hanebuth was arrested on 23 July 2013 in Mallorca. As the man in charge of the Hells Angels operations in Spain, he and other Hells Angels were accused of forming a criminal organization, promoting illegal prostitution, drug trafficking and money laundering. Spanish officials accuse Hanebuth of being the president of the Hells Angels Mallorca chapter between 2009 and 2013 and of living off the avails of prostitution, accusing him of having "coerced" women into working in Hells Angels-owned brothels.

After four weeks in solitary confinement, he was remanded in normal custody in September 2013 and was transferred to Madrid with 17 other suspects in October 2013. In December 2013, he was held in the high-security wing of a prison in El Puerto de Santa María in southern Spain. At a hearing on 22 June 2015, an investigating judge ruled that Hanebuth must remain in custody, which can last up to four years in Spain. Two years after his arrest in Mallorca, Hanebuth was released from custody in July 2015 on bail of 60,000 euros. Since July 2016, the bail conditions stipulate that Hanebuth only has to appear at the police station once a week. In July 2017, Hanebuth married his longtime girlfriend Anne Sarah Naumann in Bissendorf near Hanover. In June 2018, Hanebuth returned to Hanover's red-light district with the opening of a new bar on Scholvinstrasse.

In January 2023, Hanebuth's trial in Spain on charges of membership in a criminal organization started. After three weeks of sessions in the High Court in Madrid, the trial was adjourned on 10 February 2023 to await a verdict from the jury. In his final statement before the trial adjourned, Hanebuth denied that there was a president of the Hells Angels at national or international level and claimed that each chapter of the club is independent, saying: "We are not a criminal organization. We are the only biker club in the world that is based on a democratic structure. That means one person, one vote." On 26 September 2023, the High Court acquitted Hanebuth and twelve co-defendants of belonging to a criminal organisation.
