= Heckler & Koch SL8 =

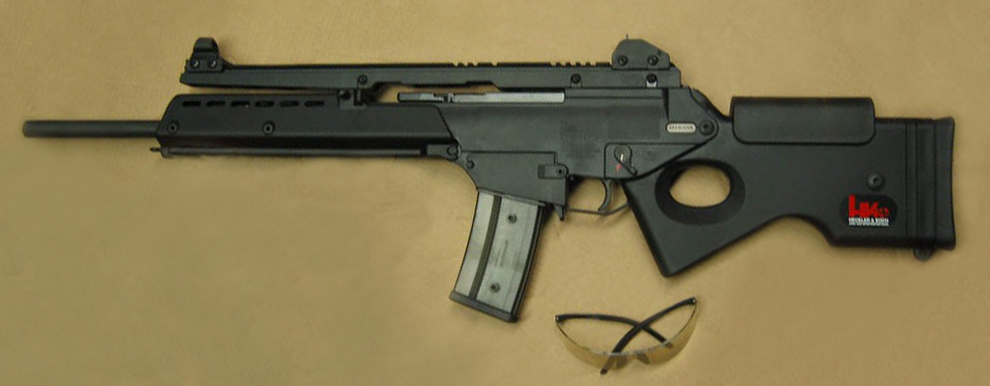
- HK SL8-5
- Type: Semi-automatic rifle Designated marksman rifle
- Place of origin: Germany

Service history
- Used by: German Army Reservists

Production history
- Manufacturer: Heckler & Koch
- Produced: 1998–present
- Variants: SL8, SL8-1, SL8-4, SL8-5, SL8-6, SL8-10, SL9SD, R8

Specifications
- Mass: 3.9 kg (8.6 lb) with magazine
- Length: 980 mm (39 in) with magazine
- Barrel length: 510 mm (20 in)
- Height: 250 mm (9.8 in) with magazine
- Cartridge: .223 Remington; 5.56×45mm NATO.300 Whisper (SL9SD)
- Action: Gas-operated, short-stroke piston, rotary locking bolt
- Rate of fire: Semi-automatic
- Feed system: 10-round single stack and 30-round double stack, detachable polymer box magazine
- Sights: Adjustable Iron sights and detachable MIL-STD-1913 rail, G36 sighting systems (optional)

The Heckler & Koch SL8 (Selbstladegewehr 1998, English, "self-loading rifle of 1998") is a semi auto designated marksman rifle manufactured by Heckler & Koch. It is a civilian and a marksman rifle version of the Heckler & Koch G36.

The rifle fires the .223 Remington or 5.56×45mm NATO cartridge and feeds from a 10-, 20- or 30-round detachable magazine (depending on the variant of the rifle). Unlike earlier types of HK rifles, it is not a roller lock bolt but rather a lug-type rotating bolt system as seen on the AR-18.

== Design ==
To adapt the G36 for the civilian market, its pistol grip and folding stock have been replaced by a fixed stock with a thumbhole. The receiver has also been modified to prevent the attachment of a folding stock. In addition, to comply with the Gun Control Act of 1968, SL8 rifles exported to the United States have been modified so that they will not accept staggered 20- and 30-round G36 magazines, only accepting single stack, 10-round magazines. Other modifications have been made to the SL8, including a lightened trigger pull, adjustable cheekpiece and buttplate to customize the fit to the user, and a heavier, more accurate barrel. The SL8 does not come with the carry handle and built-in optics of the G36, although these can be purchased aftermarket and fitted to the weapon.

American owners can modify their SL8s to accept 30-round G36 magazines and 100-round drum magazines. Doing so requires that the single-lug SL8 bolt head is replaced with a double-lug G36 bolt head, the magazine well is replaced, and the receiver is modified to permit insertion of a wider magazine body. However, such modifications to SL8 rifles (or indeed to any imported rifles) have significant implications under the 1968 Gun Control Act, which prohibits (inter alia) the assembly from imported parts of rifles that could not themselves be imported.

== Variants ==
=== SL8 (no -#) ===
This is the grey EU and Canada version that has a double-stack magazine, non-vented forearm and a short sight rail.

=== SL8-1 ===
The SL8-1 is the grey US-import version of the rifle. It has a single-stack magazine and its sighting system consists of a long rail with ironsights. The bolt is slightly modified to accommodate the single-stack magazine. The forearm is not vented.

=== SL8-2 ===
Very rare, this version was designed as the new DMR for the German Bundeswehr, although in the end it was not adopted. It was to be issued with bipod and G36 type 3.5× optic.

=== SL8-4 ===
The H&K SL8-4 is a SL8 with standard G36 handguard and double stacked magazine with G36 bolt carrier group.

=== SL8-5 ===
The SL8-5 differs from the SL8-4 only in that it uses the same long rail with ironsights as the SL8-1.

=== SL8-6 ===
This is a black SL8-1 with short sight rail, vented forearm and single-stack magazine configuration. This is the most popular version of this rifle on the US market. Originally discontinued on July 28, 2010, Heckler & Koch announced August 2, 2021 that the rifle would be making a return.

=== SL8-10 ===
A new model with short rail chambered for the .222 Remington cartridge to respect laws that prohibit certain countries' inhabitants from owning weapons in military cartridges. Mostly made for export to Spain, but it is also available in .223 Remington, like previous models, to replace the SL8-4.

== Other versions ==
=== SL9SD ===
A semi-automatic marksman rifle, gas-operated bolt with rotary bolt head using 7.82×34mm (.300 Whisper - a subsonic round made by necking up the .221 Remington Fireball case to .308" and using a 240 gr Sierra MatchKing bullet.) The cartridge will fit and feed from all standard 5.56×45mm NATO magazines. The Whisper has effectively the same power and weight as a standard .45 ACP, but the lower calibre greatly increases armor penetration. The SL9SD uses 20 and 30-round magazines, is 1150 mm (O/A length), 270 mm (height), 58 mm (width) and weighs 4.6 kg (with suppressor).

=== HK R8 ===
A modified version of the SL8, known as the R8, is manufactured with a straight-pull bolt action and uses either a 5- or 10-round magazine. These changes were made to allow the rifle to be marketed to sporting shooters in countries with more stringent gun control laws, such as the United Kingdom and Australia. It retains the general appearance of the SL8 though has a similar sight and carrying handle to the G36 rifle, and is available in black or grey.

In April 2008, the government of the Australian state of Victoria said that the R8 may be convertible to semi- or fully automatic firing in violation of state law. Heckler & Koch stated that the rifle was built from the ground up as a bolt-action firearm and that any rifle can be converted to full automatic. In March 2009, the Victoria Police Commissioner officially reclassified the HK R8 to "Category D", restricted to police and military users, because it "substantially duplicates a militaristic firearm in design, function or appearance."
