= Heckler & Koch G36 =

German 5.56mm assault rifle

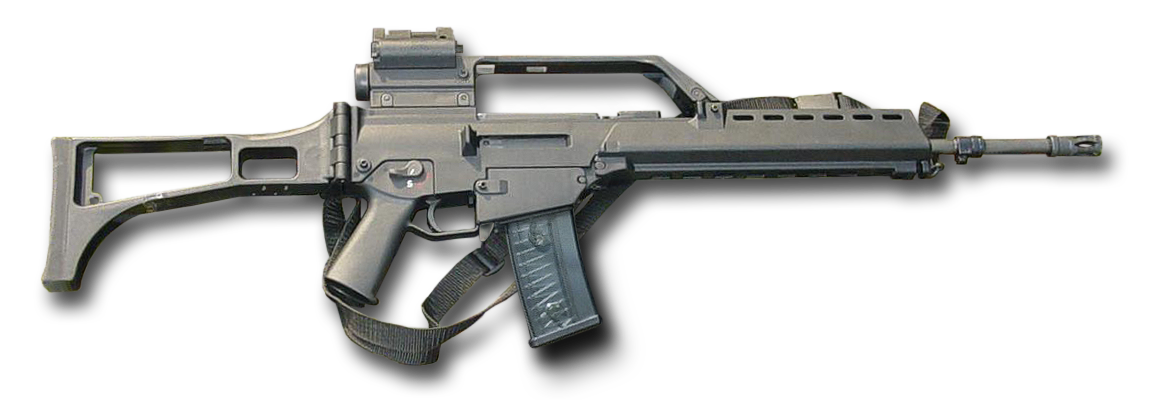
- The HK G36
- Type: Assault rifle
- Place of origin: Germany

Service history
- In service: 1997–present
- Used by: 40+ countries (see Users)
- Wars: See Conflicts

Production history
- Designer: Heckler & Koch
- Designed: 1991–1995
- Manufacturer: Heckler & Koch; Santa Bárbara Sistemas; Military Industries Corporation
- Produced: 1996–present
- No. built: 260,000+
- Variants: See Variants

Specifications
- Mass: 3.63 kg (8.00 lb)
- Length: 999 mm (39.3 in) stock extended / 758 mm (29.8 in) stock folded
- Barrel length: 480 mm (18.9 in); 318 mm (12.5 in); 228 mm (9.0 in)
- Width: 64 mm (2.5 in)
- Height: 320 mm (12.6 in)
- Cartridge: 5.56×45mm NATO
- Action: Short-stroke piston, closed rotating bolt
- Rate of fire: 750 rounds/min
- Muzzle velocity: 920 m/s (3,018 ft/s)
- Effective firing range: 600 metres (660 yd)
- Maximum firing range: 2,860 metres (3,130 yd)
- Feed system: 30-round proprietary detachable box magazine 100-round C-Mag drum magazine STANAG magazines (with optional adaptor)
- Sights: Reflex sight with 1× magnification, telescopic sight with 3× magnification (export version has a 1.5× magnified sight) and back-up fixed notch sight Picatinny rails for various optics (later models)

The Heckler & Koch G36 (German: Gewehr 36) is an assault rifle designed in the early 1990s by German weapons manufacturer Heckler & Koch. It is chambered in 5.56×45mm NATO, and replaced the heavier G3 battle rifle chambered in 7.62×51mm. The G36 was accepted into service with the Bundeswehr in 1997. Since then, it has been a popular export and has seen active service in military and police units in several countries, including Germany, Spain, and the United Kingdom. The G36 is gas-operated and feeds from a 30-round detachable box magazine or 100-round C-Mag drum magazine.

In 2012, the G36 was found to suffer from significant accuracy problems after prolonged firing, caused by thermal expansion of the barrel; this prompted a search for its replacement. In 2017, the Bundeswehr launched the System Sturmgewehr Bundeswehr, a program designed to field a replacement for the G36. The weapons put forth were the Heckler & Koch HK416, HK433, and the Haenel MK 556. The HK416 was selected in 2022, and the rifle was adopted as the G95A1. The BAAINBw stated: "From 2026, the Bundeswehr will receive the rifle with the designation G95A1 as the new standard weapon and the G95KA1 in a compact version for special forces."

== History ==
=== Development ===
In the 1970s, arms manufacturers in Germany began work on a successor for the G3 rifle, resulting in the creation of the 4.73 mm G11 assault rifle (developed jointly by a group of companies led by Heckler & Koch) that used caseless ammunition (designed by Dynamit Nobel). This weapon was intended to replace the G3, therefore further development of Heckler & Koch's series of firearms chambered for the 5.56×45mm NATO cartridge was halted. Heckler & Koch, having no incentive to pursue a new 5.56 mm weapon system, was content with the export-oriented HK33 and G41 rifles. However, the G11 program came to an abrupt end when the Bundeswehr cancelled its procurement due to defence budget cuts resulting from the unification of East and West Germany, and Heckler & Koch's 1991 acquisition by British Aerospace's Royal Ordnance division (known today as BAE Systems).

Increasing demand for a modern service rifle, chambered in the NATO-standard 5.56 mm cartridge, led Heckler & Koch to offer the German armed forces the G41 rifle, which, too, was rejected. Design work was initiated on a completely novel, modern 5.56 mm assault rifle; it would later be designated Project 50 or HK50. During testing, prototypes were rated higher than the Austrian competition (the Steyr AUG system). The final version of the G36 was completed in 1995, and production began in 1996.

=== Production ===
The HK50 rifle was selected for service and an initial order was placed for 33,000 rifles under the Bundeswehr designation Gewehr G36. The order included an option for a further 17,000 rifles. Deliveries were first made to the Bundeswehr's NATO Quick Reaction Force during the fourth quarter of 1997. The G36's production line was started in early 1996.

=== Replacement ===
In April 2012, reports surfaced that G36 rifles used in Afghanistan would overheat during prolonged firefights after several hundred rounds were fired. Overheating affected the accuracy of the G36, making it difficult to hit targets past 100 metres, ineffective past 200 metres, and incapable of effective fire past 300 metres. The G36 has been called unsuitable for long battles. Operational commanders advised allowing the weapon to cool between periods of rapid shooting.

In February 2014, the German Federal Ministry of Defence announced that the overheating deficiencies of the G36 were not a result of weapon design, but of the ammunition. A report by the Bundeswehr on 21 February 2014 revealed that the problems were not the fault of the rifle, but that one manufacturer of ammunition was making bullets with copper-plated jackets that were too thin. The manufacturer of the ammunition confirmed this, although experts disagreed, and also said the accuracy problems were already known to the defence ministry by 2010.

On 22 June 2014, it was reported that Germany's defense ministry had temporarily halted new orders worth €34 million ($45 million) over accuracy concerns for the rifle. The Bundeswehr consulted the Fraunhofer Institute for High-Speed Dynamics (Ernst Mach Institut) and the Federal Criminal Police Office. On 30 March 2015, Minister of Defence Ursula von der Leyen told Associated Press that the weight-saving design was the root of the problems. This was based on a letter from Inspector General Volker Wieker advising the Stewards of the Defence and Budget Committees of the Bundestag and the troops in advance of publication of the report. The report was released by the Fraunhofer Ernst Mach Institut and Wehrtechnische Dienststelle 91 on 19 April 2015. According to their 372-page report, the observed hit rate of the predominantly plastic weapon with the unsupported free-floating barrel drops down to a mere 7% at 100 metres when the temperature increases by 30 °C (86 °F) or more, whereas the Bundeswehr required a hit rate of 90% at that distance.

On 22 April 2015, von der Leyen announced that the G36 would be phased out of the German army due to these concerns and stated that "The Heckler & Koch G36 has no future in the German army in its current state of construction." Von der Leyen considered the weapon to be useless and stated that the German military would stop using an assault rifle that could not shoot straight when temperatures increased or the rifle heated up during a firefight.

In 2016, the Ministry of Defence attempted to sue Heckler & Koch, saying they were legally obligated to repair the subpar G36 rifles. Because the Bundeswehr did not make its specifications for the weapon clear enough in the beginning of the procurement process, the District Court of Koblenz rejected claims from the Bundeswehr procurement office, and ruled that Heckler & Koch did not have to pay damages on the 167,000 rifles still in use out of more than 176,000 G36 rifles Germany had originally purchased.

The Bundeswehr began the System Sturmgewehr Bundeswehr (Bundeswehr Assault Rifle System) effort to replace the G36 in 2017. Initially, C.G. Haenel won the competition in September 2020 offering their Haenel MK 556. However, German authorities cancelled the contract the next month, amid allegations that the MK 556 infringed on Heckler and Koch patents, and the G95A1 (known as the HK416 A8 during field testing) was selected in early 2021. Haenel sued to attempt to reverse the decision, but a German court dismissed the lawsuit in June 2022. In December 2022, the Bundestag approved initial funding to begin procuring the rifles. The Bundeswehr expected to purchase 118,718 rifles, designated G95A1 (with a 16.5 in (420 mm) barrel) and G95KA1 (with a shorter 14 in (360 mm) barrel). Fielding is planned to start in 2026.

== Design details ==
The G36 is chambered in 5.56×45mm NATO and fires from a closed rotary bolt. The rifle body has a conventional layout and a modular component design. While modifications can vary, all G36 variants share an identical receiver, buttstock assembly, bolt carrier group, return mechanism, and guide rod. The receiver contains the barrel, carry handle with integrated sights, trigger group with pistol grip, handguard, and magazine socket.

The G36 employs a free-floating barrel, meaning the barrel does not make contact with the handguard. The barrel is fastened to the receiver with a special nut, which can be removed with a wrench. The barrel is forged using a cold hammer process. It features a chrome-lined bore with 6 right-hand grooves and a 1 in 178 mm (1:7 in) rifling twist rate. The barrel features a collar and lug permitting attachment of a bayonet; it can also be used to attach rifle grenades and a flash suppressor.

=== Features ===
==== Fire selector ====
The fire and safety selector is ambidextrous and has controls on both sides of the receiver; this feature is inherited from the design of the original G3. Selector settings are described with letters: "S"—safe ("Sicher"), "E"—semi-automatic fire ("Einzelfeuer") and "F"—automatic fire ("Feuerstoß"). The three-position fire selector has a 0°/45°/90° rotation pattern between the settings. HK offers several other trigger options, including the "Navy" trigger group with illustrated pictograms for each setting. An exclusively semi-automatic trigger is also available.

==== Magazine ====
The G36 uses a proprietary 30-round magazine moulded with translucent shock-resistant plastic. The sides have interlocking studs that allow the magazines to be attached jungle-style.

An empty G36 magazine weighs 127 g (4.5 oz), while a fully loaded magazine weighs 483 g (17.0 oz).

While STANAG magazines are not normally compatible with the G36, adapters and modifications exist that enable cross-compatibility. Certain types of Beta C-Mags, which hold 100 rounds, can also be used with the stock G36, and are employed by the MG36 variant.

==== Stock ====
The G36 features a folding stock, which can shorten the overall length of the weapon for close-quarters combat. The stock also incorporates holes in which assembly pins can be stored during weapon cleaning and maintenance.

==== Material ====
The G36 employs a number of lightweight, corrosion-resistant synthetic materials in its design. The receiver housing, stock, trigger group (including the fire control selector and firing mechanism), magazine well, handguard and carry handle are all made of a carbon fibre-reinforced polyamide. The receiver has an integrated steel barrel trunnion (with locking recesses) and a nylon 66-based, steel-reinforced receiver.

=== Sights ===
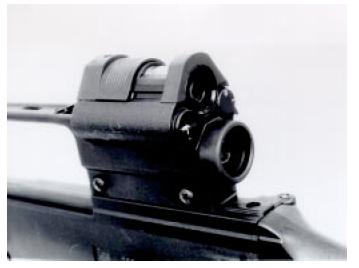
Dual combat sighting system ZF 3×4° as used on German G36A1 assault rifles

Sight picture for the main reticle

The standard German Army versions of the G36 are equipped with a ZF 3×4° dual optical sight, which includes a 3× magnified telescopic sight and an unmagnified reflex sight mounted slightly higher. The reflex sight is illuminated by ambient light during the day and uses battery-powered illumination for use at night. Electric illumination is activated automatically by a built-in photoresistor and can be manually activated to boost the brightness of the reticle in low contrast situations. The main reticle is sighted in at 200 m (219 yd) and includes crosshairs and a range-finding scale. It also features bullet drop compensation markings for 200, 400, 600, and 800 m (219, 437, 656, and 875 yd).

Export versions have a single telescopic sight with 1.5× magnification and a fixed 300 m (328 yd) reticle. All rifles are adapted to use the Hensoldt NSA 80 third-generation night sight, which clamps into the G36 carry handle adaptor in front of the optical sight housing and mates with the rifle's standard optical sight. The sighting bridge also functions as a carrying handle and features auxiliary open sights moulded on top of the handle that consist of a forward blade and rear notch, but these can only be used with the reflex sight removed, as in the G36V. The optical sight system is produced by Hensoldt AG (a subsidiary of Carl Zeiss AG).

=== Operating mechanism ===
Short-stroke gas piston

The G36 uses a short-stroke piston system from which HK later developed the HK-416's impingement system. Unlike direct impingement, the system uses gas trailing the bullet to operate the piston instead of pushing directly on the bolt. The G36's bolt is operated by a cam that guides the bolt carrier by its respective cut-out. Then, when fully pushed forward, 6 radial locking lugs fully enclose the chamber.

The design includes several features that are commonplace in modern military firearms. The bolt locks back after the last round is spent, although this can be deactivated using the bolt catch button on front end of the trigger guard. The charging handle folds and unfolds automatically via a spring when firing; the handle can also be operated from either side of the firearm. The handle also doubles as a forward assist in the event of a failure to feed. The ejection port has a brass deflector that helps left-handed users avoid being struck by casings. The bolt also acts as a dust cover.

=== Accessories ===
The rifle can be fitted with a 40 mm AG36 (German: Anbau-Granatwerfer) under-barrel grenade launcher, which loads via a side-tilting break action.

Standard equipment supplied with the G36 includes: spare magazines, a cleaning and maintenance kit, sling, speedloader and sometimes modified AKM type II blade bayonets (many of which are left over in Germany from stocks of the former National People's Army).

== Variants ==
=== G36 ===
Introduced in 1996, the G36 is chambered in 5.56×45mm NATO. It features a 18.9 in (480 mm) barrel.

The G36V (German: Variante, lit. 'Variant') is the export variant of the G36, previously known as the G36E (lit. 'Export'). The G36V features an altered sight setup and bayonet mount. It is fitted with a 1.5× or 3× sight and lacks the integrated reflector sight. It features a standard NATO bayonet mount. The G36V was first produced for the Spanish and Latvian National Armed Forces.

The G36A2 is an upgraded variant of the G36 also in service with in the German Army. It is equipped with a quick-release Zeiss RSA reflex red dot sight mounted on a Picatinny rail, replacing the original red dot sight. The G36A2 includes the shorter G36C stock, a new handguard made of aluminium (permitting better heat dissipation during sustained fire), an optional four Picatinny rails, and a vertical foregrip with an integrated switch for the LLM01 laser light module. Throughout its service life, it has received further modernisation upgrades, designated as the G36A3 and G36A4.

Some G36A1 rifles were given the same modernisation upgrades as the G36A3 while reusing the original, cheaper A1 receiver. These variants are known as the G36A1.1.

=== G36K ===
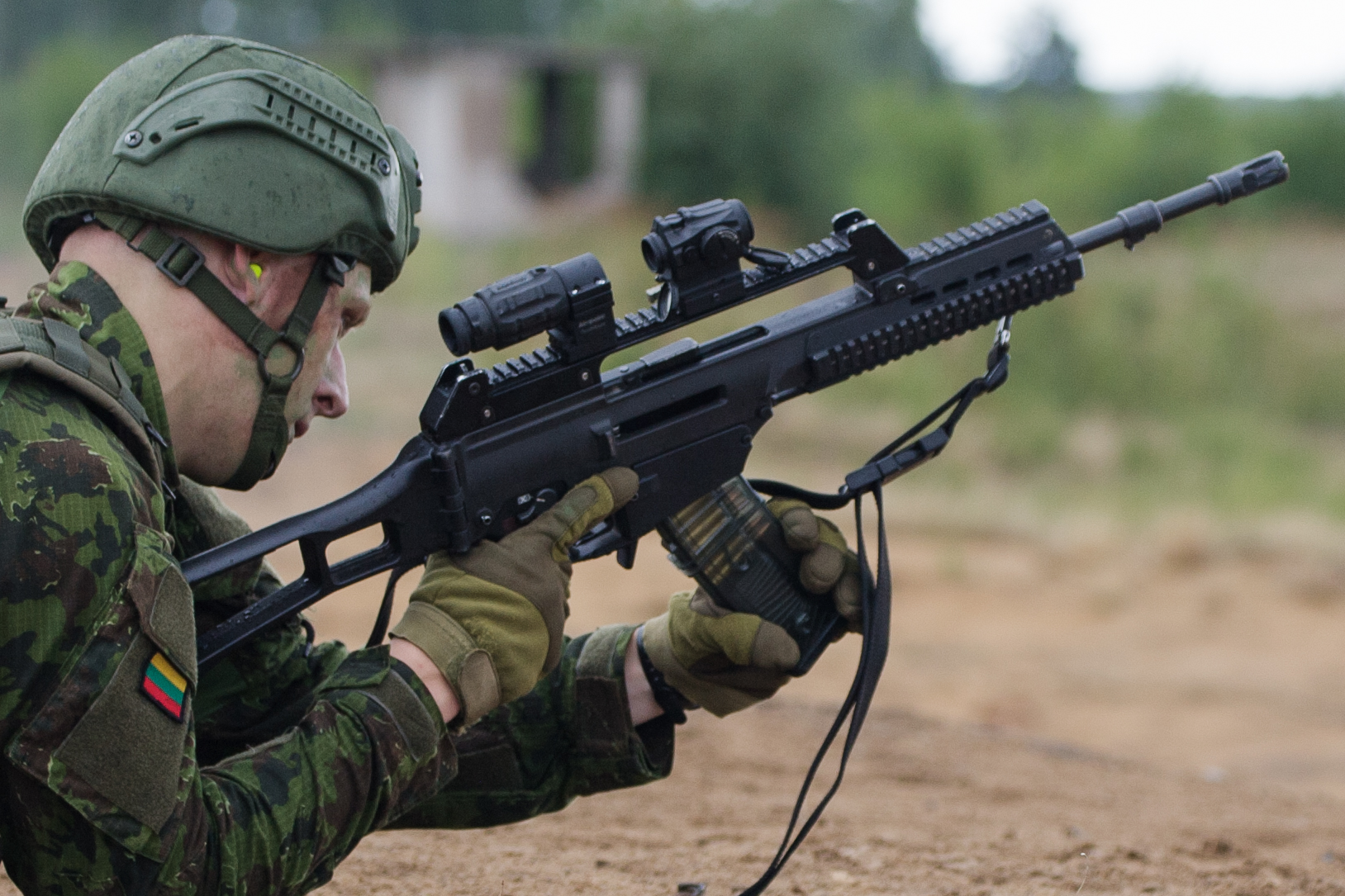
A modernized G36K being held by a Lithuanian soldier

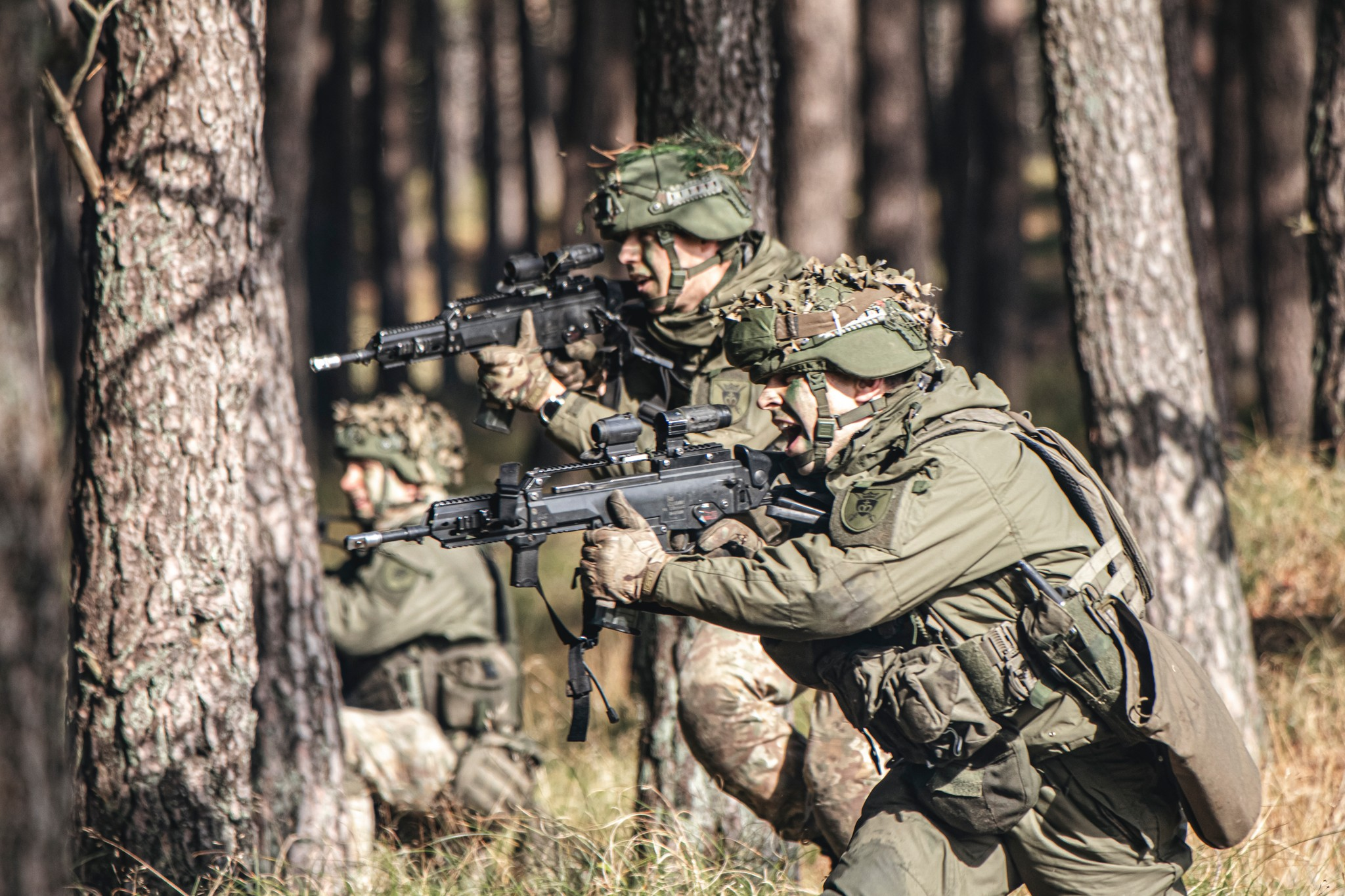
Lithuanian soldiers during combat training exercise with a G36KA4M1

Introduced in 1997, the G36K (German: Kurz, lit. 'Short') is a carbine variant with a shorter barrel, an open-type flash suppressor, a shorter forend, and a bottom rail. The carbine's barrel lacks the ability to launch rifle grenades and does not support a bayonet. The weapon retains compatibility with the AG36 grenade launcher. G36Ks in service with German special forces are issued with a 100-round C-Mag drum. The G36K has multiple slight variations. One includes a 3× scope/carry handle attached to the top, while the second only includes iron sights and a rail.

The G36KV (formerly G36KE) is the export variant of the G36K, using the sights on the G36V.

The G36KA4 is a modernised variant of the G36K made for German special forces. It adds the proprietary HKey mod system to the handguard, a heavier barrel, and the carry handle of the G36C. The stock was also replaced with an IdZ adjustable stock for better handling while using body armour.

=== G36C ===
Introduced in January 2001, the G36C (lit. 'Compact') is a compact variant and a further development of the G36K. It has a shorter barrel than the G36K and either a four-prong open-type flash hider or a birdcage type flash hider. The extremely short barrel forced designers to move the gas block closer to the muzzle end and reduce the length of the gas piston operating rod. The handguard and stock were also shortened, and it includes a lower-profile carrying handle with a MIL-STD-1913 Picatinny rail. The dual optical sight found on the standard G36 and G36K models was replaced with a set of rail-mounted detachable iron sights that consist of a semi-shrouded front post and a flip-up rear sight with two apertures of different diameter. The short handguard has four accessory attachment points, one of which could be used for a vertical grip.

=== MG36 ===
The MG36 (German: Maschinengewehr, lit. 'Machine gun') is a squad automatic weapon variant of the G36 equipped with a heavier barrel for increased thermal performance and cook-off resistance.

The MG36 and MG36E (lit. 'Export') are no longer offered by Heckler & Koch.

=== Licensed productions ===
==== Spain ====
In July 1998, it was announced that the G36 had been selected as the service rifle for the Spanish Armed Forces, replacing the Spanish-designed 5.56 mm CETME Model L and LC rifles. Deliveries started at the end of 1999.

From 1999 to 2005, 75,219 rifles were manufactured in Spain under license by General Dynamics' Santa Bárbara Sistemas at the Fábrica de Armas de La Coruña (FACOR) facility in Coruña, Galicia.

Spanish G36 rifles are equipped without integral red dot sight, instead with a Picatinny Rail to mount an EoTech holographic sight

==== Saudi Arabia ====
The rifle has been licensed for local production in Saudi Arabia by the Military Industries Corporation (MIC). Technology transfer was granted by Germany to Saudi Arabia on 30 June 2008.

The first Saudi-made G36 was produced at MIC's factory on 30 June 2009. However, some components of their own G36s are supplied by Heckler & Koch.

=== Sporting and civilian variants ===
Heckler & Koch created the semi-automatic SL8 rifle and the straight-pull, bolt-action R8, which are offered to the civilian sport shooting markets, both loosely based on the G36. The SL8 is substantially different from the G36, it has a modified receiver and a thumbhole stock with a cheek rest, which is integral with the trigger group. The SL8 has a heavy profile, extended, 510 mm (20.1 in) barrel that does not have a flash hider or bayonet lug. The rifle uses a 10-round single-stack magazine and an extended top rail used to mount a wide variety of Picatinny-standard optics. Mounted to the rail are a set of iron sights with a hooded foresight and adjustable flip rear aperture. The SL8 can also mount the G36 carry handle and integrated sight assembly, after removing the mechanical iron sights. The SL8 has an unloaded weight of 4.3 kg (9.5 lb), overall length of 980–1,030 mm (39–41 in) and a trigger rated at 20 N (4.5 lb_{f}).

In November 2013, Heckler & Koch applied for permission from the German Government to sell a new civilian-legal version of the G36. Known as the HK243 in Europe and the HK293 in America, it is more similar to the G36 assault rifle than previous civilian models. The main difference is the bolt, redesigned not to allow a conversion to fully automatic fire. It has quad picatinny rails and accepts STANAG magazines. Four different barrel lengths from 230 mm (9.1 in) to 480 mm (19 in) and four stock models (short fixed, long fixed and two adjustable) will be offered.

In November 2020, semi-automatic only G36 rifles became available for sale on the civilian market in Canada. They were sold with match grade barrels by Lothar Walther for CAD $5,999, or with a Heckler & Koch barrel for CAD $7,998.

=== Other variants ===
==== Steyr G62 ====
In May 2021, Steyr Arms introduced the G62 upgrade for G36 rifles. According to Steyr, the components of this upgrade kit (metal receiver, barrel and magazine well) can be mounted independently on existing G36 arms without any modifications. German media speculated this might be a relatively inexpensive way to extend the service life of the G36 in the Bundeswehr pending the outcome of legal procedures regarding a new system assault rifle tender for the Bundeswehr.

==== TommyBuilt Tactical T36 ====
The TommyBuilt Tactical T36 is an American-made clone receiver based on the G36, which was started in 2007 by Tom Bostic based on converting a SL8 to a G36. In February 2021, the BATF classified it as a machine gun.

==== DefGunz Def36 ====
The DefGunz Def36 is an American-made clone receiver based on the G36, which was started in 2024 by Suliban Deaza.

==== S5 Tactical SG-36 ====
The S5 Tactical SG-36 is an American-made clone receiver based on the G36, which was released in 2025.

== Gallery ==
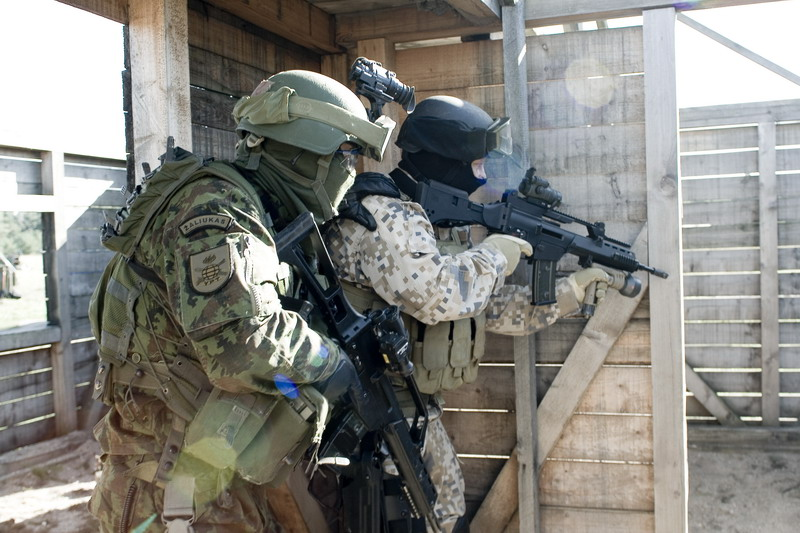
Lithuanian Special Forces Special Purpose Service member and Latvian soldier

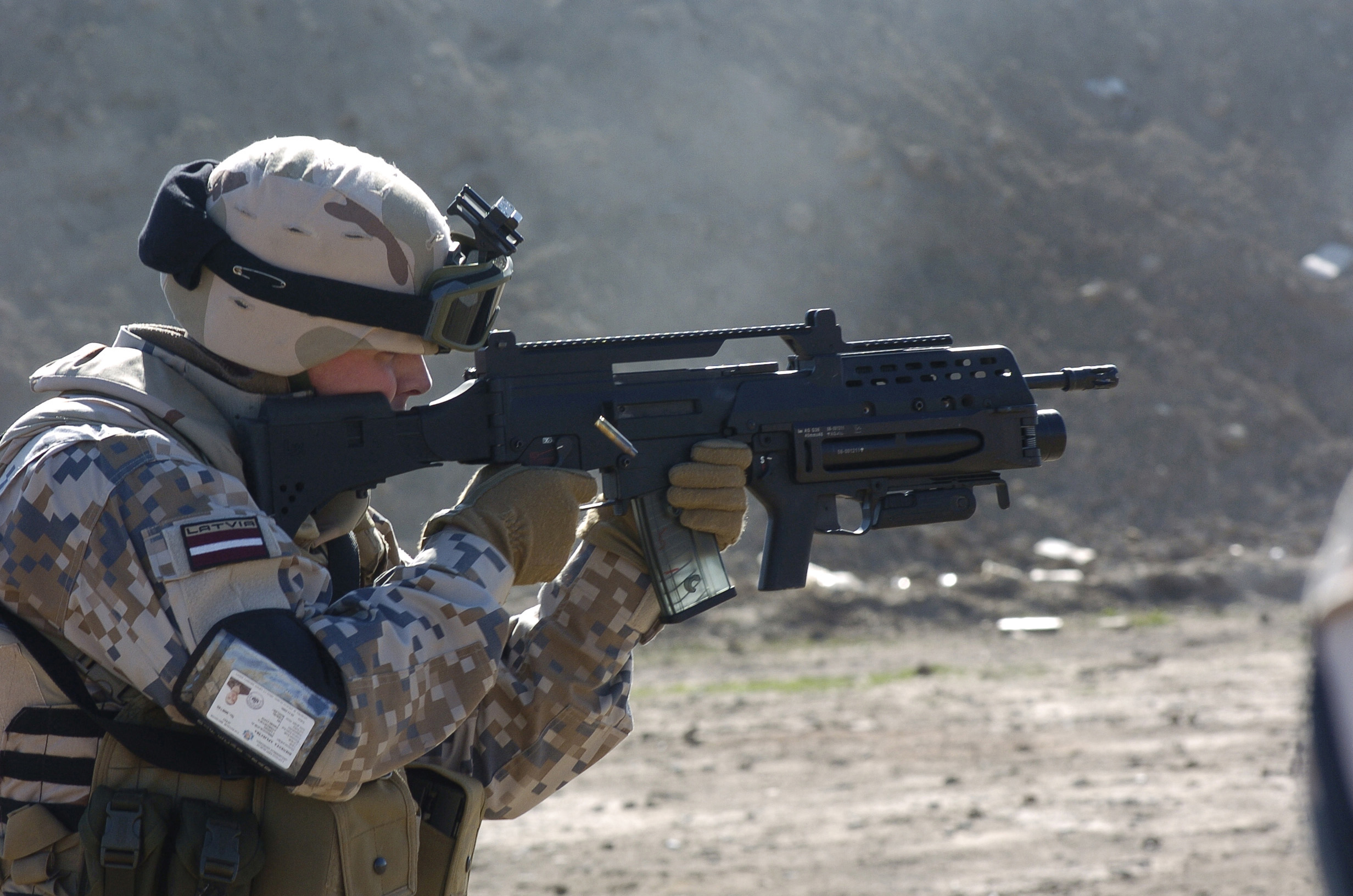
A Latvian soldier with the G36V/AG36 combination

A U.S. soldier of the 1st Aviation Regiment holding a G36

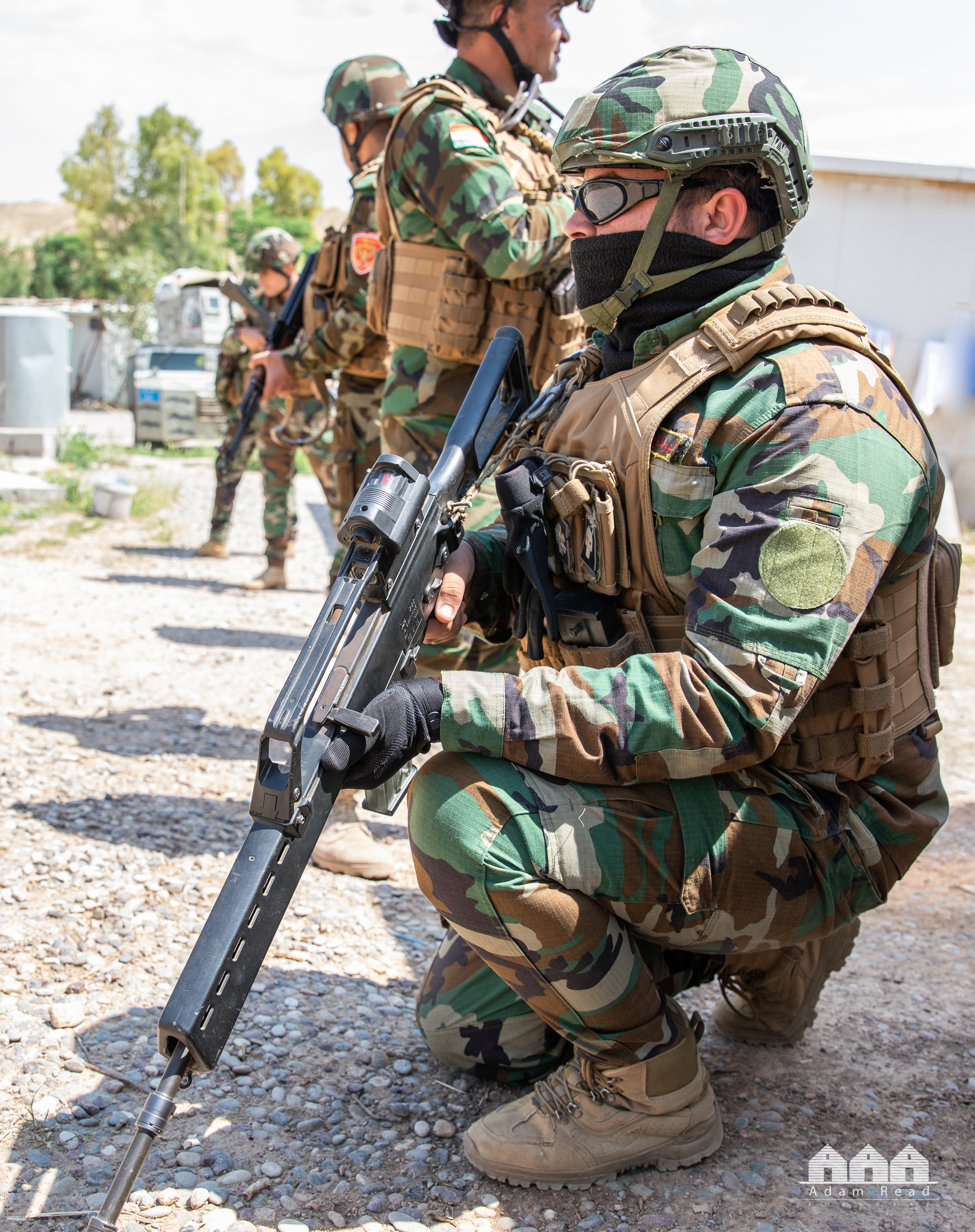
Peshmerga Zeravani Commando with the G36 May 2019

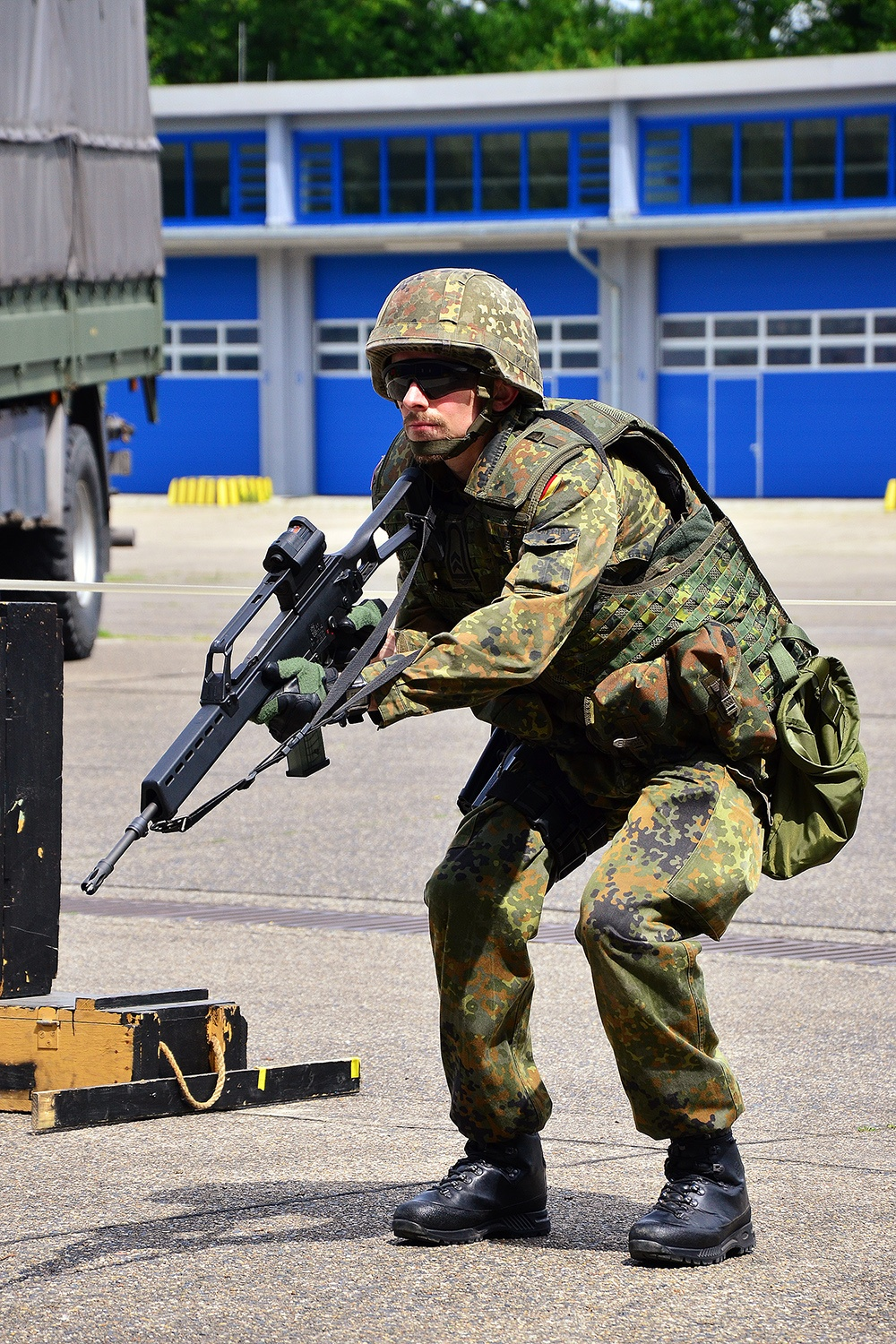
A German soldier holding his G36

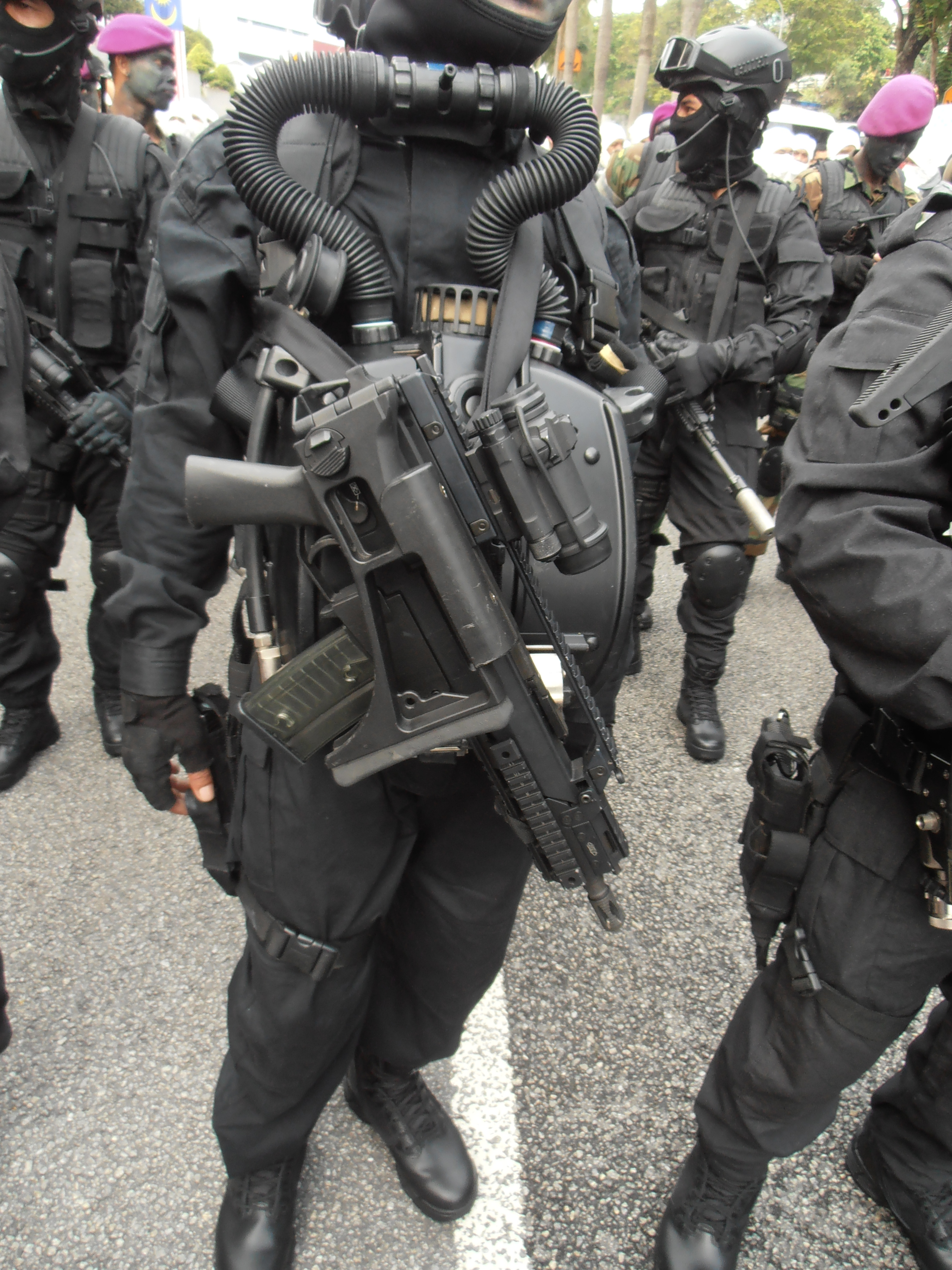
A Malaysian Navy Special Force personnel equipped with G36C

== Users ==
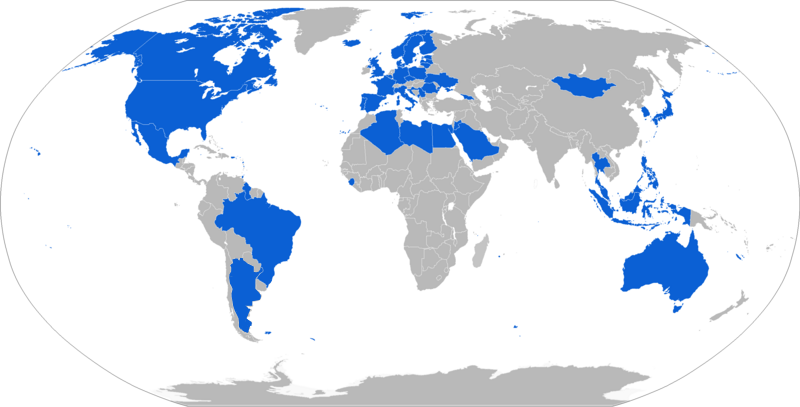
Map with Heckler & Koch G36 users in blue

Country/Territory	Organization name	Model	Quantity	Date	Reference
Argentina	Airport Security Police (Argentina) Standard long rifle for GEAT special forces units.	G36	_	_	
Algeria	Special Intervention Detachment, Directorate of Security and Presidential Protection, Algerian Special Forces	_	_	_	
Australia	Australian Federal Police Specialist Response Group	_	_	_	
Belgium	Antwerp local police special squad BBT (Bijzondere Bijstandsteam)	_	_	_	
Brazil	Brazilian Federal Police	G36K, G36C	_	_	
Canada	Victoria Police Department	G36	~100	2004	
Croatia	Croatian peacekeepers	G36	_	_	
Croatia	Croatian police special units	_	300	2004	
Croatia	Croatian Armed Forces contingents in international operations	_	550	2007	
Czech Republic	Police of the Czech republic: * URNA – Nationwide paramilitary SWAT unit * KZJ – Regional SWAT units * SPJ – Special riot units * PMJ – Emergency motorized units	G36C, G36K	_	_	
Denmark	Politiets Aktionsstyrke	G36C	_	_	
East Timor	Policia Nacional de Timor-Leste	G36K	_	_	
Egypt	Used by special forces and police, Some later to Libyan Jamahiriya, see below	_	608+	2003	
Estonia	Estonian Special Operations Force	G36K	_	_	
Finland	Finnish Border Guard	G36C	_	_	
Finland	Finnish Police	G36C	_	_	
France	French Army	G36E	_	_	
France	RAID, GIGN	G36C	_	_	
France	Brigade Anti-criminalité (BAC), SDLP, CRS.	G36C, G36K	204	2016	
Germany	Standard service rifle of the Bundeswehr. It will be replaced by the G95A1 and G95KA1 in 2022.	G36A1, G36A2; G36K, G36C	181,773 delivered, 166,619 in use	_	
Germany	Used by the GSG9, PSA BPOL and BFE+ sections of the German Bundespolizei	_	_	_	
Germany	Used by Missions Abroad and Special Operations unit of the Bundeskriminalamt	_	_	_	
Georgia	Police special forces: Central Anti Crime Division, Special Crisis Unit, Special Operations Department, Coast Guard Anti piracy Unit	G36K, G36C	230	_	
Hong Kong	Special Duties Unit of the Hong Kong Police Force	G36KV	_	2001	
Iceland	National Police of Iceland and its special forces unit Víkingasveitin	_	_	_	
Indonesia	Kopassus (Special Forces Command) of the Indonesian Army	G36C	_	_	
Indonesia	Denjaka (counter-terrorism special operations force) of the Indonesian Navy	G36V, G36C	_	_	
Indonesia	Korpasgat (Quick Reaction Forces Corps) of the Indonesian Air Force.	G36C	_	_	
Italy	NOCS team of the Italian Police	G36C	_	_	
Japan	Used only by the Japanese Special Forces Group.	_	_	_	
Jordan	Jordanian special forces 71st Special Battalion	G36C	_	_	
Kosovo	Kosovo Security Force	G36V	3500	2010	
Kurdistan Region	Peshmerga	G36	8,000	2014	
Latvia	Latvian Army, National Guard, State Border Guard	G36V, G36KV	_	2006	
Lebanon	Lebanese Armed Forces, Internal Security Forces	G36C3	250	2008	
Libyan Arab Jamahiriya; Libya (Anti-Gaddafi forces)	Unclear (unit based in Tripoli; possibly special forces/Khamis Brigade). Weapons are from a batch legally sold to Egypt in 2003.	G36KV, G36E	"numerous" Probably <600	2003–2005?	
Libyan Arab Jamahiriya; Libya (Anti-Gaddafi forces)	Tripoli Brigade (looted from Bab al-Azizia arms store)	G36KV, G36E	"numerous" Probably <600	2011	
Lithuania	Lithuanian Armed Forces	G36KA4, G36KV1; G36C, G36KA4M1	_	2017 (G36KA4M1)	
Malaysia	Pasukan Khas Laut (PASKAL) Maritime Counter-Terrorism Forces of the Royal Malaysian Navy	G36C, G36E; G36KE	_	2006	
Malaysia	Pasukan Gerakan Khas (PGK) Counter-Revolutionary Warfare of the Royal Malaysia Police	G36C	_	_	
Mexico	Various Mexican law enforcement agencies use the G36, namely the Mexican Federal Police and many state and city police forces	G36 Family	_	_	
Mongolia	Mongolian Armed Forces	_	_	_	
Montenegro	Military of Montenegro	G36, G36C, G36K	655	as of 2015	
Montenegro	Protivteroristička Jedinica Policije (Counter-Terrorist Police Unit) (PTJ)	G36C, G36K	_	_	
Montenegro	Posebna Jedinica Policije (Special Police Unit) (PJP)	G36C, G36K	_	_	
Norway	Norwegian Navy Kystjegerkommandoen	G36KV2	_	2001–2007	
Philippines	Armed Forces of the Philippines Presidential Security Group	G36K, G36C	_	_	
Poland	BOA/SPAP special units of the Policja	G36V, G36K; G36C	_	_	
Poland	Biuro Ochrony Rządu (BOR) Government Protection Bureau	G36C	_	_	
Poland	Jednostka Wojskowa Formoza naval unit of the Polish Special Forces	G36KV3, G36C	_	2006	
Portugal	Portuguese Army (Special Operations Troops Centre)	G36KV, G36KV3	_	_	
Portugal	Portuguese Marines (Special Actions Detachment)	_	_	_	
Portugal	Portuguese Air Force (Polícia Aérea)	_	_	_	
Portugal	Guarda Nacional Republicana (GNR)	G36C	200	_	
Portugal	Grupo de Operações Especiais (GOE) of the Polícia de Segurança Pública	_	_	_	
Romania	Special Operations Forces of the Romanian Armed Forces	G36K, G36C	_	_	
Saudi Arabia	Saudi Arabian Army, Police, Border Guards, Special Forces	G36C, G36E; G36KE	_	_	
Serbia	72nd Brigade for Special Operations of the Serbian Armed Forces	G36C	_	2010	
Sierra Leone	Sierra Leone Police force	G36K	112+	2001	
South Korea	Korea Coast Guard SSAT (Special Sea Attack Team)	_	_	2007	
Spain	Spanish Armed Forces Guardia Civil	G36E, G36KE; G36CE	75,219	_	
Spain	Unidad de Operaciones Especiales special group of Spanish Navy and Spanish Marines	G36E, G36KE; G36CE	_	_	
Sweden	National Task Force	G36C	_	Replaced by LWRC M6	
Sweden	Piketen	G36C	_	Replaced by LWRC M6	
Sweden	Särskilda operationsgruppen	G36K, G36C	_	Replaced by LWRC M6	
Trinidad and Tobago	Will soon replace the IMI Galil in use by the Trinidad and Tobago Regiment and become the primary service rifle.	G36	_	_	
Thailand	Naresuan 261 Counter-Terrorism Unit Special Operations Unit of the Royal Thai Police	G36C, G36K; SL8	_	2007	
Thailand	Royal Thai Army (RTA) Infantry.	G36K, G36KE; G36E, MG36E	_	_	
Thailand	Underwater Demolition Assault Unit (UDAU) tactical diver group of the Royal Thai Navy (RTN)	G36KV	_	2004	
Thailand	Royal Thai Marine Corps Amphibious Reconnaissance battalion Special operations forces (RECON), RTN	G36C	_	2004	
Ukraine	Main Directorate of Intelligence (Ukraine)	G36KA4	_	_	
Ukraine	Armed Forces of Ukraine	G36 with STANAG modifications	_	_	
United Kingdom	Avon and Somerset Police	G36C/G36K/G36E	_	_	
United Kingdom	City of London Police	G36C/G36K/G36E	_	_	
United Kingdom	Civil Nuclear Constabulary	G36C/G36K/G36E	_	_	
United Kingdom	Greater Manchester Police	G36C/G36K/G36E	_	_	
United Kingdom	Humberside Police	G36C/G36K/G36E	_	_	
United Kingdom	Kent Police	G36C/G36K/G36E	_	_	
United Kingdom	Lancashire Constabulary	G36C/G36K/G36E	_	_	
United Kingdom	Norfolk Constabulary	G36C/G36K/G36E	_	_	
United Kingdom	Northumbria Police	G36C/G36K/G36E	_	_	
United Kingdom	Nottinghamshire Police	G36C/G36K/G36E	_	_	
United Kingdom	Police Scotland	G36C/G36K/G36E	_	_	
United Kingdom	Police Service of Northern Ireland	G36C/G36K/G36E	_	_	
United Kingdom	Specialist Firearms Command, Metropolitan Police Service	_	_	_	
United Kingdom	South Wales Police	_	_	_	
United Kingdom	West Yorkshire Police	_	_	Until 2017	
United Kingdom	Special Air Service	_	_	_	
United States	Baltimore City Police Department	_	_	_	
United States	Cobb County Police Department	G36K	_	2000	
United States	United States Capitol Police	G36K	_	_	
United States	Fairfax County Police Department	G36C	_	_	
United Nations	United Nations Department for Safety and Security	G36V, G36KV; G36CV, MG36E	_	_	
United Nations	Department of Peacekeeping Operations	G36V, G36KV; G36CV, MG36E	_	_	

== Conflicts ==
=== 1990s ===
- Kosovo War (1998–1999)

=== 2000s ===
- War in Afghanistan (2001–2014)
- Iraq War (2003–2011)
- Mexican Drug War (2006–present)
- Russo-Georgian War (2008)

=== 2010s ===
- Rio de Janeiro security crisis (2010)
- Libyan Civil War (2011)
- Lahad Datu standoff (2013)
- War in Iraq (2013–2017)

=== 2020s ===
- Russo-Ukrainian War (2014–present)

== See also ==
- Beretta ARX160
- FX-05 Xiuhcoatl
- Heckler & Koch XM8, prototype assault rifle based on the HK G36.
