= Combat Team Conference =

The Combat Team Conference (CTC) is a competition of military and law enforcement special operations units. Founded in 1983, it is hosted every four years by the GSG 9 of the German Federal Police in Sankt Augustin in Germany.

== History ==
The CTC was initiated in 1983 by the former GSG 9 commanders Ulrich Wegener and Uwe Dee in order to improve cooperation among the different units and to encourage the exchange of ideas and experience.

The first CTC in 1983 included 20 different participants which included special response units from the United States, Switzerland, and the Netherlands.

== Modern day events ==
The most recent CTC was held in 2015. Participants included 43 participating teams which included special response units from Colombia, Hong Kong, Japan, and Thailand. The competition lasted six days and included hostage rescues, close quarter combat, marksmanship. Due to the international participants, English was introduced as the competition's official language.

== Comparable events ==
- SWAT World Challenge
