= Cambridge Temperature Concepts =

UK medical device manufacturer

Cambridge Temperature Concepts (CTC) is a UK-based company that specialises in the design and manufacture of continuous physiological monitoring devices. Their main product is a patented fertility monitor called DuoFertility.

== History ==
The company was started by six post graduate students (Dr Shamus Husheer, Dr David Naumann, Dr Oriane Chausiaux, Dr. Lydia Ferguson, Chafic Ayoub and Scott Mackie) at the University of Cambridge, England in 2005, and won multiple entrepreneur awards at the University, regionally and nationally, including the Downing Enterprise award, the CUEBiC Business Plan Competition, and the UKSEC Business Plan Competition. In 2011 the company was named European Wireless Start-up of the year by Qualcomm.

== Media coverage ==
During development, CTC received media publicity, including in Business Weekly, The Cambridge News, and The Telegraph.

The company captured national and international media attention with a novel "Pregnant in 12 months or your money back" offer for its DuoFertility product in 2009.

The DuoFertility product featured on a BBC television documentary following innovations to retail success, resulting in the UK pharmacy chain Boots stocking the product.

== DuoFertility ==
The DuoFertility device can aid the practice of fertility awareness or natural family planning (although marketed only to help achieve pregnancy, while other systems for FA and NFP can also be used as birth control). The device is a stick-on patch containing a coin-sized chip that automatically measures and records basal body temperature every few minutes. A hand-held device is then used to read out the temperature data collected via wireless transmission and analyse it. This analysis is used to predict the time of ovulation based on 24-hour time measurement, in order to aid couples trying to conceive.

In 2010, data on the first 200 couples using DuoFertility was released demonstrating a pregnancy rate after 6 months of use similar to that of a cycle of IVF for couples with a history of unexplained infertility or mild-to-moderate male or female factors.
