= Transaction-Based Reporting =

Transaction-based reporting, or Invoice reporting, sometimes called Continuous Transaction Controls (CTC), is a method of data collection of governmental bodies to reduce fraud and increase compliance. Invoice reporting helps in overcoming the inefficiencies of post audit systems, where the auditors can only check VAT refunds after the facts and mainly needs to use data that is collected by the companies it is auditing. The core of invoice reporting is that all companies within a jurisdiction report their invoices to their tax authority.

== History ==
Invoice reporting was first implemented in Latin America. In most Latin American countries, transaction-based reporting is coupled with electronic invoicing and therefore the Inter-American Development Bank named the system ‘electronic invoicing of taxes’. However, the key principle is the same as it is defined as ‘electronic invoices that are not only valid for all tax purposes but that are also received in their entirety by the tax authority’. Chile and Mexico were the first and soon others followed.

Over time, transaction-based reporting has proved to be efficient in contrasting VAT fraud. For instance, Brazil saw an increase of US$58 billion in tax revenues, while Chile and Mexico reduced their VAT gap by 50%. Furthermore, Colombia estimates that it can achieve the same result if they implement such an invoice reporting system.

Around the same time, China started its Golden Tax Project. Part of this project is the Golden Tax System, which started as a pilot in the 1990s and is soon to be integrated with every company in the country. India, is also implementing e-invoicing to increase compliance. Other countries in the region, such as Israel and Jordan are investigating this possibility as well.

Tunisia has been a pioneer in the African region as they introduced mandatory e-invoicing in 2016. In Tunisia, invoices are reported to the responsible authorities, and therefore can be considered as transaction-based reporting. Furthermore, Egypt is also conducting research in the best model of invoice reporting.

The trend and successes of invoice reporting also reached Europe, though not combined with mandatory electronic invoicing. Countries such as Hungary, Spain, and Italy have implemented a variant of invoice reporting in the second half of the 2010s. The successes of these and other systems made France decide to implement an invoice reporting system combined with e-invoicing from July 2024. The news also reached the European Commission as it stated in their Action Plan for Fair and Simple Taxation Supporting the Recovery Strategy, published in 2020, that by 2022/2023 the Commission ‘will present a legislative proposal for modernising VAT reporting obligations. The EU's Digital Reporting Requirements Directive amendment proposals are due by the end of 2022.

== Usage ==
In countries where a VAT system exists without mandatory invoice reporting, often companies self-report the amount of VAT which they supposedly received and sent in a certain reporting period. These reporting periods are typically between 1 and 12 months. Because companies are free to fill in what they want on their VAT return, fraudsters can potentially fill in false information. Suppliers might report that they collected 100 euro in VAT, whilst in reality they collected 1000 euro in VAT, which allows them to keep VAT instead of giving it to the tax authority. Buyers might report that they paid 10,000 euro in VAT, which allows them to fraudulently get back money from the tax authority. A widely noted type of VAT fraud is Missing Trader Fraud. By using transaction-based reporting systems, discrepancies between the buyer and seller can be identified, and reduced. Moreover, even without analysing data, transaction-based reporting systems have a preventative effect due to the fact that companies are aware that their data is collected.

== Implementation ==
Most invoice reporting systems are developed by the country implementing the system itself. This results in a wide variety of ways to implement them.

– (Near) real-time transaction-based reporting: Transaction-based reporting can be either real-time or near real-time. A near-time invoice reporting system requires the taxpayer to report all invoices within a certain amount of days after the invoice was actually sent to the buyer. An example of such a system can be found in Spain. The system is called Sistema de Información Inmediata (SII) and companies have 4 days to report all invoices after issuance. Real-time invoice reporting requires to report invoices at the same time of their issuance. The Italian system Sistema di Interscambio (SdI) is an example of such a system.

– Electronic invoicing and data exchange: In some countries, transaction-based reporting requirements are coupled with a particular mandatory electronic invoicing standard. This approach was taken e.g. by many Latin American countries. Alternatively, companies can also be given the freedom to use existing electronic invoicing and Electronic Data Interchange solutions to exchange data. While the freedom to choose a data format may lower the administrative burden for some companies, it also raises questions about which invoice data and format can be considered legally valid.

– Centralised clearance: Some countries require companies to send the invoice to the tax authority before it will be sent to the buyer. Transaction-based reporting systems in Peru and Italy function like this. The advantage is that fraudulent companies can be interrupted in their business activities at a very early stage. However, it could also cause honest businesses to be interrupted when a false-positive fraud alert has been triggered. Furthermore, VAT experts like Aleksandra Bal underline the high compliance costs that may generate for businesses from a centralised clearance system.

– Data to report: The type of data required by the transaction-based reporting system can vary. In Italy and Spain, the national transaction-based reporting system requires significant amounts of invoice information from businesses. The PEPPOL (Pan-European Public Procurement Online) e-invoicing network suggested the use of only a few data points per invoice. During a working group session of the European Parliament, a design was praised to only share a fingerprint or a hash of the original invoice.
