= PSA BPOL =

Specialized unit of the German Federal Police

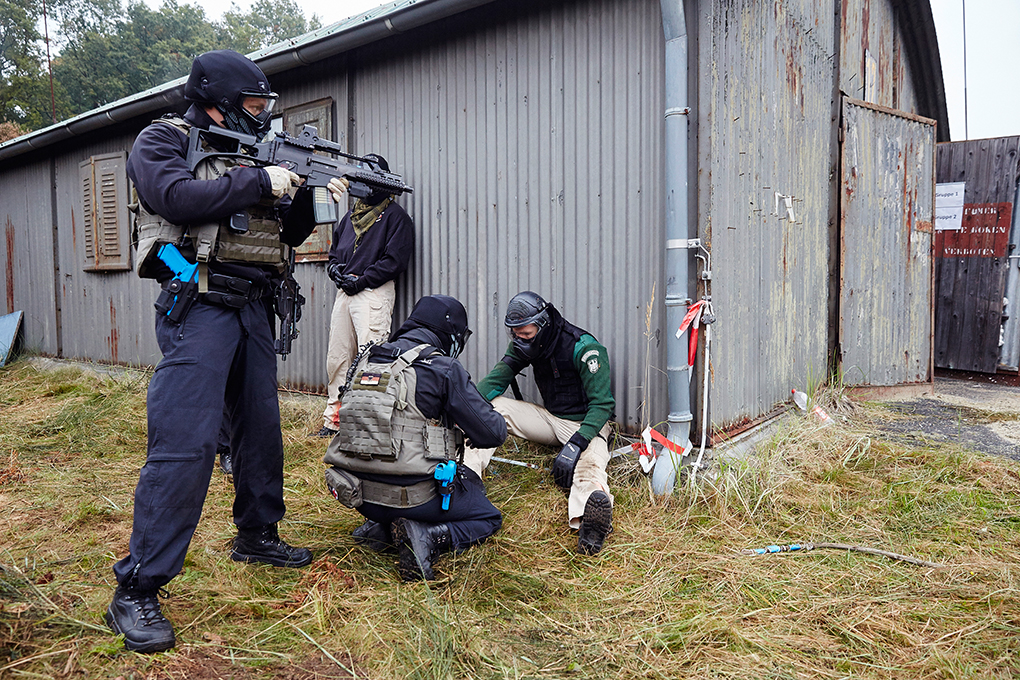
PSA officers participating in the exercise Black Griffin 2018

Polizeiliche Schutzaufgaben Ausland der Bundespolizei (PSA BPOL) ("Police Protection Tasks Abroad of the Federal Police", formerly known as ASSIK for Arbeitsstab Schutzaufgaben in Krisengebieten) is a specialized unit of the German Federal Police tasked with providing personal security for German diplomatic missions in conflict regions.

== Background ==
The protection of German diplomatic missions is one of the tasks of the Federal Police. In conflict, the diplomatic protection was carried out by the GSG 9 with support of the Federal Criminal Police Office. In 2008, the Federal Ministry of the Interior tasked the Federal Police with reorganizing this form of protection in order to reduce the workload of the GSG 9.

== Organization ==
Due to the positive responses of the newly established ASSIK, the Federal Police decided to continue the unit as section 44 (Referat 44).

- In January 2009 ASSIK is tasked with the protection of the embassy personnel in Kabul, Afghanistan
- Since January 2010 ASSIK took over the protection of the embassy personnel in Bagdad, Iraq.

In June 2012, section 44 was dissolved and the unit was attached under the command of the GSG 9.

Due to the continuously deteriorating security in various regions, PSA BPOL was tasked with an increasing number of deployments which include the embassies in Yemen, Libya or short-term missions such as in Egypt during the revolution of 2011 and Haiti during the 2010 earthquake.

On August 1, 2017, the Department 11 (BPOLD 11) was formed as an umbrella organization for all specialized units of the Federal Police (i.e. GSG 9 and aviation unit) which also included PSA.

== Selection and Training ==
Police officers of the intermediate and upper career groups (mittlerer and gehobener Dienst) of the Federal Police may apply for service with PSA BPOL if they have completed their police training or degree programme and are both capable of and willing to serve abroad. They must also pass a suitability and selection procedure (Eignungsauswahlverfahren, EAV). Experience shows that between 40 and 60 percent of applicants pass the EAV.

After passing the EAV, candidates undergo a three‑month specialist training course for personal protection duties. During this phase, participants first learn the fundamentals of close protection, with an emphasis on protecting individuals within Germany (such as politicians, defendants, and witnesses in criminal proceedings). This is followed by advanced first‑aid training based on the principles of Tactical Combat Casualty Care, as well as operational driving instruction using specially protected and off‑road‑capable vehicles. Only after these modules is the focus shifted to protective measures in crisis and conflict regions. Throughout the course, trainees receive intensive firearms instruction (including training on special weapons such as the G8), physical conditioning, and realistic operational scenario training. The failure rate for this specialist training is approximately 25 percent.

== Deployments and cooperations ==
PSA officers deploy in rhythms of three months which are followed by periods of six months in Germany. The periods in Germany are used to train other PSA officers which are currently in pre-deployment training.

One PSA officer was killed during his deployment in Sanaa (Yemen) in October 2013. The 2016 bombing of the German consulate in Mazar-i-Sharif saw intense fighting for PSA officers in the attacked building.

PSA cooperates closely with other units with similar tasks. An a result of the cooperation with the Dutch BSB, the EU-funded project Black Griffin was established which enables several special units tasked with close protection duties to cross-train and to cooperate. Other participants include EKO Cobra from Austria or the Mobile Security Deployments from the United States.

== Equipment ==
Aside from ballistic vests, the PSA BPOL team are equipped with the following items:

| Name | Country of origin | Type |
|---|---|---|
| Heckler & Koch USP | Germany | Semi-automatic pistol |
| Heckler & Koch P30 | Germany | Semi-automatic pistol |
| Heckler & Koch G36 | Germany | Assault rifle |
| Heckler & Koch HK21 (G8) | Germany | Light machine gun |
