= Kampfretter =

Special operations force of the German Air Force

Combat rescuemen
- Kampfretter
- Active: 2013–present
- Country: Germany
- Branch: German Air Force
- Type: Special forces
- Part of: German Air Force Regiment
- Garrison/HQ: Schortens
- Motto: That others may live

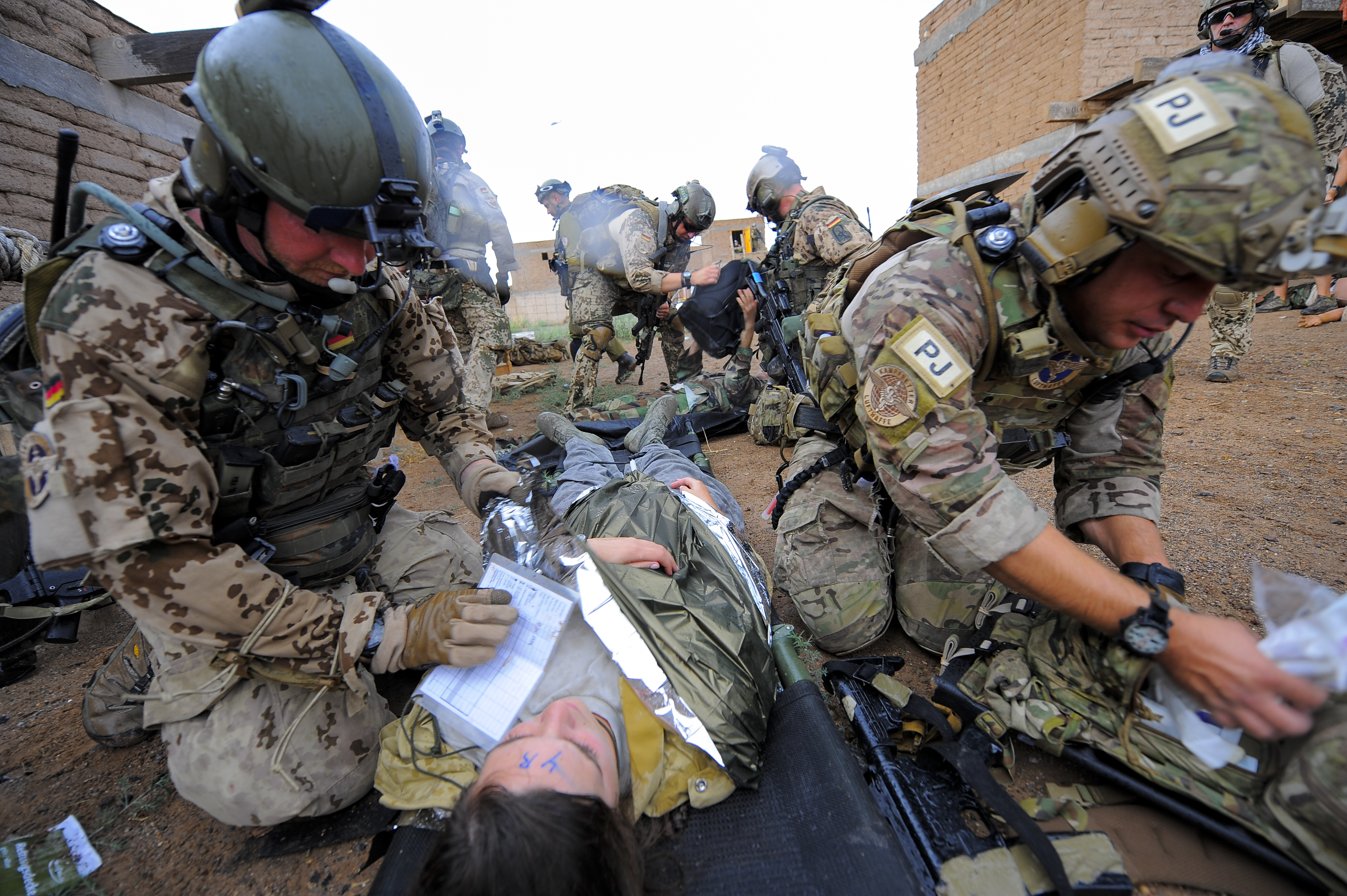
German Kampfretter during training with a United States Air Force Pararescue operator

Kampfretter (German: Kampfretter, lit. 'Combat rescuemen') are specialized forces of the German Air Force, tasked with combat search and rescue (CSAR) missions. As part of personnel recovery Kampfretter units are tasked with the recovery of air crews and personnel in hazardous regions or behind enemy lines.

== Selection and training ==
Candidates for serving as part of the Kampfretter units are recruited from the German Air Force Regiment. In order to increase the number of candidates, recruitment is being opened for every active duty member of the German armed forces. The completion of basic infantry training and an enlistment of 20 years is required for prospective members. Candidates undergo a strict selection process which is followed by training in:

- Specialized infantry training
- Completion of German commando course
- Parachutist course including HALO/HAHO qualification
- Rappelling/fast-roping
- Mountain rescue
- SERE training
- Close quarter fighting
- Extraction via helicopter
- Medical training

The completion of the entire training circle may take up to two years.

== Mission and deployments ==
Since their establishment Kampfretter personnel have been deployed as part of the NATO-led Resolute Support Mission in Afghanistan.

Along with the German Army's KSK Kampfretter were among the first to respond to the 2016 bombing of the German consulate at Mazar-i-Sharif.

== See also ==
- United States Air Force Pararescue
- European Personnel Recovery Centre
