= SWAT World Challenge =

Annual competition of law enforcement SWAT teams

The Original SWAT World Challenge is an annual competition of law enforcement SWAT teams. It is usually held close to Little Rock, Arkansas, US and its goals are to encourage exchange of ideas/techniques and promote the high level of tactical skills, mental focus and physical endurance possessed by SWAT Teams.

== History ==
The event began in 2004 under its original name of World SWAT Challenge and was won by San Antonio, Texas. In 2005, Germany's GSG 9 won all eight events and in 2006 won four of the eight events maintaining its top SWAT World Challenge ranking. The event was renamed Original SWAT World Challenge in 2005 when the tactical footwear company Original SWAT became title sponsor, and has since been expanded into the World SWAT Series which will include regional competitions capable of hosting 25–30 competing teams. The first of these was the Northeastern SWAT Challenge in late 2006, followed in 2007 by the addition of the Rocky Mountain Tactical Challenge, and a Mid-Western SWAT Challenge in 2008. These regional events follow the same format of the OSWC but with six events rather than eight, and are not limited to thirty teams.

OLN televised the 2007 event which was held 24–28 April close to Little Rock, Arkansas at Camp Joseph T. Robinson (National Guard Base). This could become the regular venue for the competition. Original SWAT Footwear Company has discontinued its sponsorship of the event, and is now the title sponsor of the 2008 Original SWAT Tactical World Cup.

== Events ==
1. Zodiac Attack
2. Scott Entry Problem
3. Leopard Challenge
4. Glock Pistol Shoot Off
5. Sniper Challenge
6. Vehicle Assault
7. 3 Gun Challenge
8. Original SWAT Rage Run

== Ranking ==
These are the current rankings of the competing teams as of 2007. Most are designated from their city/state or country of origin.

Place	Team	Points
1	Ocean County, NJ	15
2	US DOE/OST	24
3	Lexington, KY	30
4	Bruce Power	33
5	GSG9 (Germany)	40
6	DOE- Lawrence Livermore	62
7	Wake Co., NC	69
8	Gwinnett Co., GA	81
9	Indiana State Police	84
10	Durham Regional Police	85
11	Shelby County	86
12	Hanford Patrol	89
13	Greenville Police	97
14	FIAT, DuPage County IL	114
15	Arkansas State Police	114
16	Chilton Co.	115
17	Cincinnati, OH	115
18	Columbus City, IN	117
19	Ct. Central Region E. R. T	117
20	Lancaster Co. SERT	136
21	Connecticut State Police	139
22	Douglas County, CO	139
23	Toronto - ETF	143
24	Germantown, TN P.D.	147
25	Kane Co. (UT) Sheriff	152
26	South Suburban ERT, IL	157
27	A. T., Aruba	170
28	Van Buren, AR	172

== Members ==
Team Roster (2007 World SWAT Challenge Champions) The winning team, honored with the Valor Award, included officers from three local agencies: [1]

- Stafford Township PD: Sgt. Herman Pharo, Officers Jeffrey Ross, Kenneth Schiattarella, Daniel Samaritano, Michael Morrin, Robert Woodring, Drew Smith, and Jason Costello.
- Lacey Township PD: Officers Robert Flynn and Sam Dellasala.
- Harvey Cedars PD: Officer Steven Frazzee.
