= Tangled Tunes =

Music by Albert Ketèlbey

Tangled Tunes is a piece of light classical music by Albert Ketèlbey, first recorded in 1914, comprising 107 melodies with some repetitions.

1. Rule, Britannia! by Thomas Arne
2. Three Blind Mice
3. The Mistletoe Bough by Henry Bishop
4. Ah Che la Morte from Il Trovatore by Giuseppe Verdi
5. Flower Song (Faites-lui mes aveux) from Faust by Charles Gounod
6. Three Fishers by John Hullah
7. Drinking (Im tiefen Keller sitz' ich hier) by Ludwig Fischer
8. Heart of Oak by William Boyce
9. Charlie is My Darling
10. The Minstrel Boy
11. Gathering Nuts in May
12. Dixie's Land by Dan Emmett
13. Soldiers' Chorus from Il Trovatore by Verdi
14. Grandfather's Clock by Henry Clay Work
15. La Marseillaise by Claude Joseph Rouget de Lisle
16. The British Grenadiers
17. Home Sweet Home by Henry Bishop
18. Bluebells of Scotland
19. Prelude to Act III from Lohengrin by Richard Wagner
20. Sailor's Hornpipe
21. The Girl I Left Behind Me
22. Garryowen
23. Poet and Peasant Overture by Franz von Suppé
24. 1812 Overture by Pyotr Ilyich Tchaikovsky
25. Tannhauser March by Wagner
26. 1812 Overture by Tchaikovsky
27. Il Bacio by Luigi Arditi
28. Je Veux Vivre (Waltz) from Roméo et Juliette by Gounod
29. Prophete March from by Le prophète by Giacomo Meyerbeer
30. Soldiers' Chorus from Faust by Gounod
31. O Tender Moon (O nuit d'amour) from Faust by Gounod
32. Silver Threads Among the Gold by Hart Pease Danks
33. Killarney by Michael William Balfe
34. Mary of Argyle by Sidney Nelson
35. Robin Adair by Charles Coffey
36. Wedding March from A Midsummer Night's Dream by Felix Mendelssohn
37. Anvil Chorus from Il Trovatore by Verdi
38. Yankee Doodle
39. Dixie by Dan Emmett
40. Maid of Athens by Henry Robinson Allen
41. Johnny Get Your Gun by Monroe Rosenfeld
42. Raymond Overture by Ambroise Thomas
43. Light Cavalry Overture by Suppè
44. The Keel Row
45. For He's a Jolly Good Fellow
46. The Harp That Once Thro' Tara's Halls
47. Scenes That are Brightest (Maritana) by William Vincent Wallace
48. Lend Me Your Aid (Inspirez-Moi, Race Divine) from La reine de Saba by Gounod
49. Blue Danube by Johann Strauss II
50. Poet and Peasant Overture by Suppè
51. Spring Song from Songs Without Words by Mendelssohn
52. Little Brown Jug
53. La Donna e Mobile from Rigoletto by Verdi
54. Excelsior by Michael William Balfe
55. The Lass of Richmond Hill by James Hook
56. The Bay of Biscay by John Davy
57. Rule, Britannia! by Thomas Arne
58. Vicar of Bray
59. D'ye ken John Peel
60. Last Rose of Summer
61. Villikins and his Dinah
62. Did You Ever See a Lassie?
63. The Ash Grove
64. Sally in Our Alley by Henry Carey
65. Alice, Where Art Thou? by Joseph Ascher
66. Sweet Genevieve by Henry Tucker
67. Semiramide Overture by Rossini
68. Marche aux Flambeaux by Frederick Scotson Clark
69. Marching Through Georgia by Henry Clay Work
70. The Merry Wives of Windsor Overture by Otto Nicolai
71. Stephanie Gavotte by Alphons Czibulka
72. Kirmesse Scene (Vin ou bière) from Faust by Gounod
73. Rákóczi March from La Damnation de Faust by Hector Berlioz
74. Sword Chorus from Faust by Gounod
75. 1812 Overture by Tchaikovsky
76. Bohemian Girl Overture by Balfe
77. Der Freischütz Overture by Carl Maria von Weber
78. Tannhauser March by Wagner
79. Three Cheers for the Red White and Blue
80. When Johnny Comes Marching Home by Patrick Gilmore
81. William Tell Overture by Rossini
82. Good King Wenceslas
83. Tannhauser March by Wagner
84. Il Balen from Il Trovatore by Verdi
85. Dio Possente from Faust by Gounod
86. Athalie March by Mendelssohn
87. Ach, wie ist's möglich dann by Friedrich Wilhelm Kücken
88. Come, Birdie Come by Charles Albert White
89. Ta-ra-ra-Boom-De-Ay
90. Tancredi Overture by Rossini
91. Oh Dear What Can the Matter Be
92. Rocked in the Cradle of the Deep by Joseph Philip Knight
93. The Bogie Man
94. Pop Goes the Weasel
95. Amoretten Tanz by Joseph Gungl
96. Waltz of the Flower from The Nutcracker by Tchaikovsky
97. Waltzes, Op. 34 No. 1 by Frédéric Chopin
98. Nocturnes, Op. 9 No. 2 by Chopin
99. Fragment from Faust by Gounod
100. Waltz from Faust by Gounod
101. The Flying Dutchman Overture by Wagner
102. Auld Lang Syne
103. Old English Gentleman
104. God Save the King
105. Zampa Overture by Ferdinand Hérold
106. 'Alf a pint of mild and bitter (added post publication)
