= Kuijken =

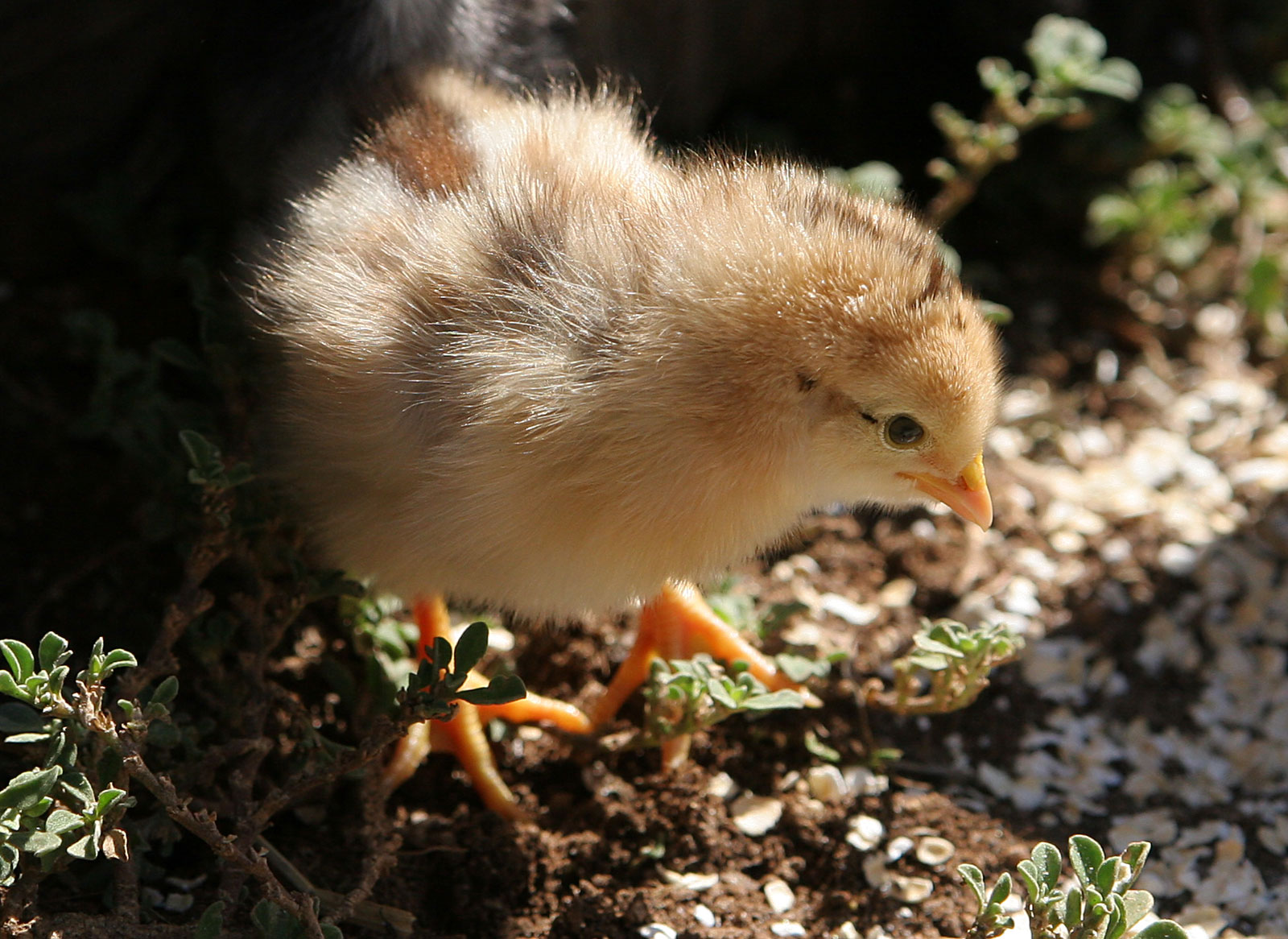

Origin
- Language: Dutch
- Meaning: The hatched young of a bird
- Region of origin: Netherlands

Other names
- Variant forms: Kücken, Kück

Kuijken (meaning "the hatched young of a bird, especially fowl"; modern Dutch spelling kuiken) is a Dutch surname. The name comes from the city of Cuijk, it is a derivative of the Celtic word Keujka with the meaning of a river meander. It may refer to:

A Belgian family of musicians

- Barthold Kuijken – baroque flute player
- Sigiswald Kuijken – conductor and baroque violin player
- Wieland Kuijken – viol and cello player
- Marleen Kuijken-Thiers – viola player; wife of Sigiswald Kuijken
- Marie Kuijken – soprano and fortepianist; stage director. Daughter of Sigiswald
- Sara Kuijken – baroque violinist. Daughter of Sigiswald
- Veronica Kuijken – violinist and pianist. Daughter of Sigiswald
- Filip Kuijken – luthier in Japan
- Ivar Kuijken (b. 1987) – woodwind player. Son of Barthold
- Piet Kuijken (b. 1972) – fortepiano player. Son of Wieland

== See also ==
- Susan Kuijken (born 1986), Dutch distance runner
- Friedrich Wilhelm Kücken (Low German form)
- Andreas Kück, German keyboardist
