= German patrol boat Bad Bramstedt =

German offshore patrol vessel

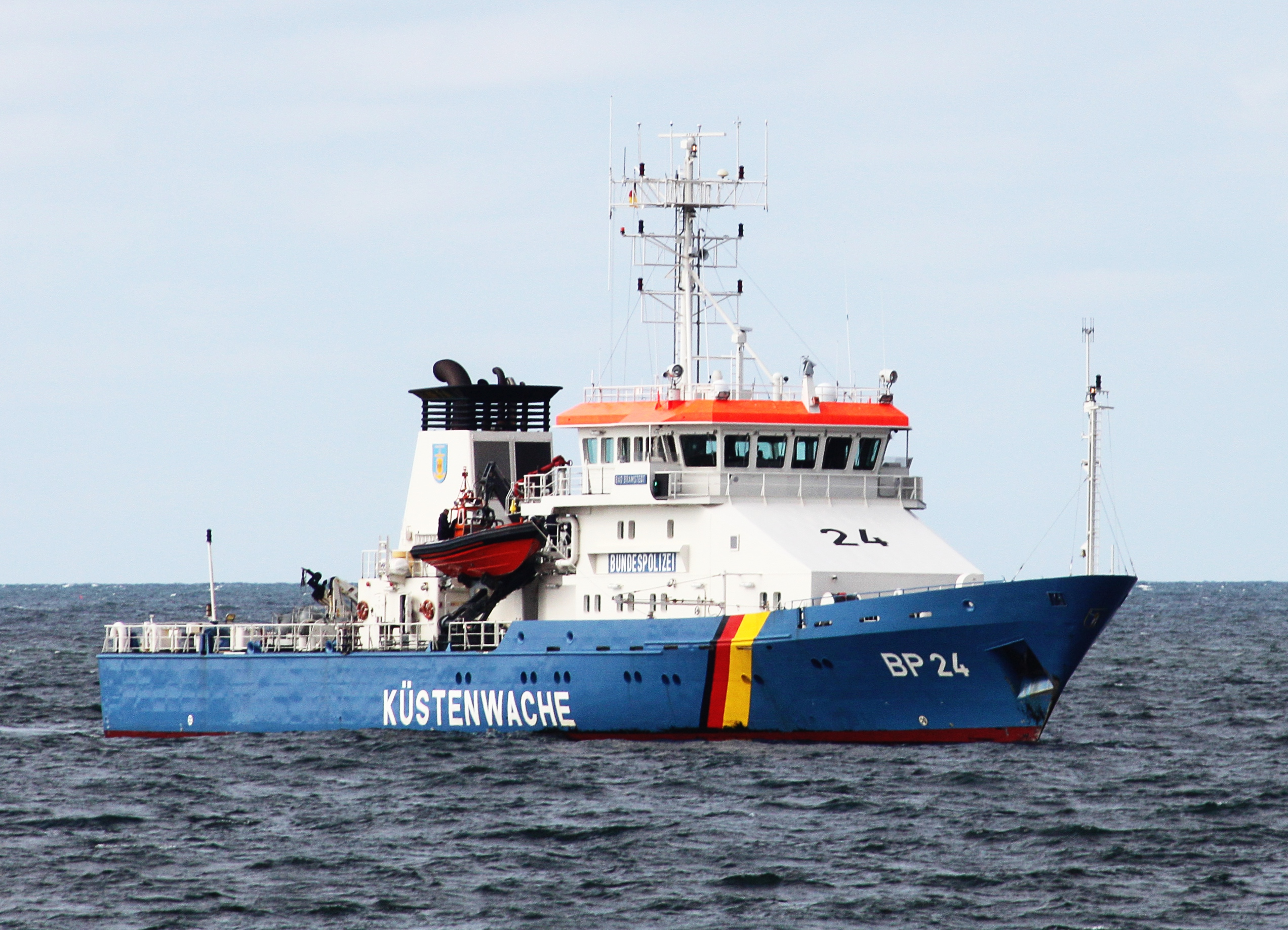

History

Germany
- Name: Bad Bramstedt
- Namesake: Bramstedt Mountain
- Ordered: July 2000
- Builder: Yantar Shipyard
- Launched: 16 November 2001
- Commissioned: 19 November 2002
- Status: In service

General characteristics
- Class & type: Bad Bramstedt-class patrol vessel
- Length: 65.75 m (215 ft 9 in)
- Beam: 10.6 m (34 ft 9 in)
- Draught: 3.4 m (11 ft 2 in)
- Propulsion: 1 × MTU 16V1163 diesel engine; 1 × 600 kW diesel-electric auxiliary motor
- Speed: 22 knots (41 km/h; 25 mph)
- Complement: 14
- Aircraft carried: NH 90 helicopter
- Aviation facilities: Helipad

Bad Bramstedt (BP 24) is an offshore patrol vessel operated by the German Federal Police. It is the lead vessel of the Bad Bramstedt class and is homeported at Neustadt in Holstein. Bad Bramstedt is tasked with maritime law enforcement, border protection, and environmental monitoring in the North Sea and Baltic Sea. The vessel is named after the town of Bad Bramstedt in Schleswig-Holstein, which serves as the administrative headquarters of the Federal Police's maritime division, and sometimes serves out of Cuxhaven in the German Bight.

== Construction ==
The Bad Bramstedt-class patrol vessel were ordered in July 2000 by the German Federal Border Guard, which was reorganized in July 2005. The hull was prefabricated at Yantar Shipyard, Kaliningrad, and was further outfitted at Abeking & Rasmussen in Lemwerder, Germany. The vessel was launched on 16 November 2001, and commissioned on 19 November 2002. The goal of the vessel class was to replace Neustadt-class vessels, the aging class that has received few upgrades and overhauls since launching.

== Measurements ==
Bad Bramstedt was assessed at 1,030 GT (1.03×10^{16} G) and has a full displacement of 880 tonnes (870 long tons). She has a length of 65.75 m (215 ft 9 in), with a beam of 10.6 m (34 ft 9 in) and a draft of roughly 3.4 m (11 ft 2 in). Her propulsion is provided by a single MTU 16V1163 diesel engine generating 5,200 kW (7,000 hp) and a single 600 kW diesel-electric auxiliary motor for economical cruising. Her primary engine allows her to reach roughly 22 knots (41 km/h; 25 mph) while her secondary engines can allow for roughly 12 knots (22 km/h; 14 mph). She is crewed by 14 personnel members, with extra berths and amenities for extra crew or passengers if needed. The vessel features a helipad, capable of handling a single NH-90 helicopter. Her deep-V hull and aluminium-alloy structure provides more stable sea worthiness in heavy seas. She does not feature a permanent fixed armament, but her crew does carry individual small arms, including the H&K P30 service pistol, the H&K MP5 submachine gun, and the H&K G36 rifle.

== Service history ==
Her mission includes maritime border protection, pollution control, fishery inspection, and coastal patrol within Germany's exclusive economic zone in the North and Baltic seas. The vessel makes up part of the force under the German Coast Guard, alongside other vessel from the Water Customs, the Federal Waterways and Shipping Administration, and the Federal Office for Agriculture and Food.

The vessel participated in the large-scale exercise ATLAS Seal in June 2021, where she trained alongside EU police partners against terroristic threats in the North Baltic Sea. In June 2024, she partook in UEFA Euro 2024, a multi-national maritime exercise, supporting Schengen border controls. In November 2024, the vessel was deployed to surveil the Chinese-owned Yi Peng 3, after the freighter was suspected of sabotaging an undersea cable in the area. Bad Bramstedt has served alongside the Danish frigate HDMS Hvidbjørnen. The vessel is also responsible for providing a training platform and participating in simulation acts coordinated through the Maritimes Schulungs- und Trainingszentrum.
