= German patrol boat Potsdam =

German Federal Coast Guard patrol vessel

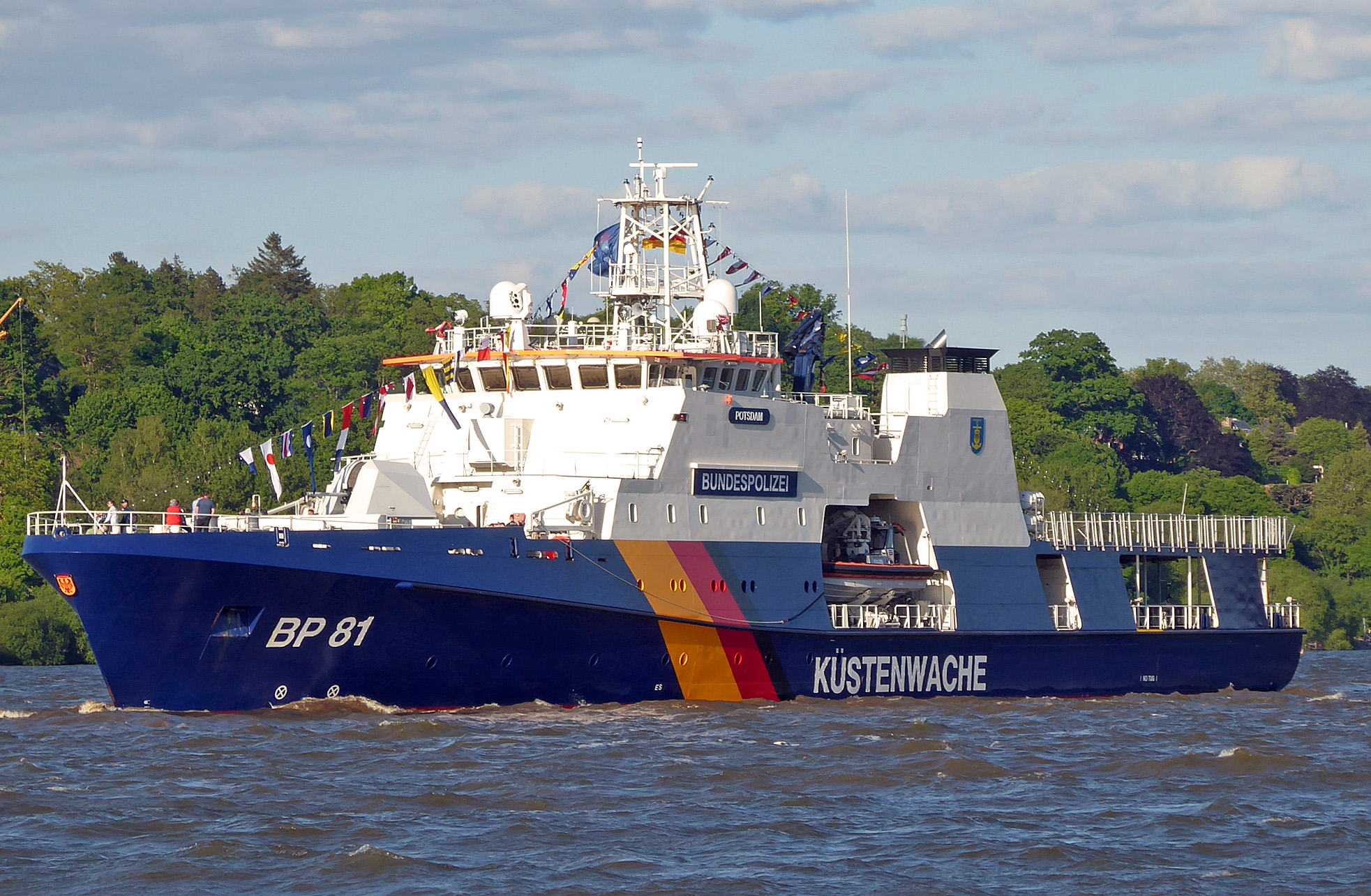
Potsdam underway in 2024.

Potsdam (BP 81) is an 86-meter (282 ft) offshore patrol vessel of the German Federal Coast Guard operated by the German Federal Police. It is named after the city of Potsdam, the capital of Brandenburg. She is the lead ship of the Potsdam-class patrol vessels and is homeported at Cuxhaven, Lower Saxony.

== Construction and description ==
The contract for three completed vessels of the class was awarded in December 2016 to Fassmer in Berne, Germany. The keel of Potsdam was laid on 14 August 2017, and the vessel was launched on 8 December 2018, with yard number 7040. Final outfitting took place at Fassmer and the vessel was handed over to the Federal Coast Guard in May 2019 while the vessel was finally commissioned into service on 22 July 2019, at Neustadt in Holstein. The decision to arm the vessel was announced at its christening on 14 December 2018. She was subsequently refitted with a permanent armament in 2020, with the installation of a BAE Systems/Bofors Mk. 110 57 mm naval gun, as well as two 12.7 mm M3 heavy machine guns allowing her to target hostile vessels over 18,000 yards (16,000 m) away.

The vessel has an overall length of 86.02 m (282 ft 3 in) with a beam of 13.42 m (44 ft 0 in) and a draft of 3.95 m (13 ft 0 in). She displaces roughly 1,890 metric tons (1,860 long tons) and is crewed by a complement of 19, with accommodations to fit up to 48 persons. Her propulsion is provided by two Wärtsilä 12V26F diesel engines, each producing 4,080 kilowatts (5,470 hp), as well as two 820 kW Caterpillar electric motors. She has a maximum speed of 21 knots (39 km/h; 24 mph) with a cruising speed of roughly 15 knots (28 km/h; 17 mph) using controllable-pitch propellers and two bow thrusters. While the vessel does not have a hangar for permanent aircraft stowage, she does have a flight deck, capable of operating Airbus AS332 L1 Super Puma and NH90 helicopters. The vessel has the capability to transport up to five TEU container modules.

== Service ==
Since the vessel entered service on 22 July 2019, she has conducted patrols across Germany's territorial waters in the North Sea and exclusive economic zone (EEZ). Typical missions last between five to six days and often involve supporting international police activities among the seas. She is tasked with maritime law enforcement, border protection, and environmental monitoring in the North and Baltic seas. On 11 October 2022, Potsdam was deployed as part of a contingent fleet to investigate suspected damage to the Nord Stream 1 and Nord Stream 2 pipelines in the Baltic Sea. She operated alongside the civilian vessel Eckernforde and naval minehunter Kiel.
