= German Federal Coast Guard =

German Federal Coast Guard Küstenwache des Bundes
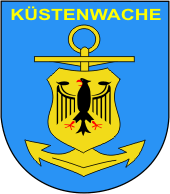

- Racing stripe

Jurisdictional structure
- Federal agency: Germany
- Operations jurisdiction: Germany
- General nature: Federal law enforcement
- Specialist jurisdiction: Coastal patrol, marine border protection, marine search and rescue

Operational structure
- Services provided by: Bundespolizei/Federal Police, Federal Agency for Agriculture and Nutrition, Federal Waterways and Shipping Administration and Bundeszollverwaltung
- Uniformed as: German Federal Coast Guard

The German Federal Coast Guard (German: Küstenwache des Bundes) is a civilian law enforcement organisation whose primary missions are border protection, maritime environmental protection, shipping safety, fishery protection and customs enforcement. The Küstenwache is an association of several federal agencies, not a single entity like the United States Coast Guard.

The agencies that make up the Küstenwache have a common plan of action and direct their operations from two Coast Guard Centers (German: Küstenwachzentren), Neustadt (Holstein) for the Baltic Sea and Cuxhaven for the North Sea.

== Structure and responsibilities ==
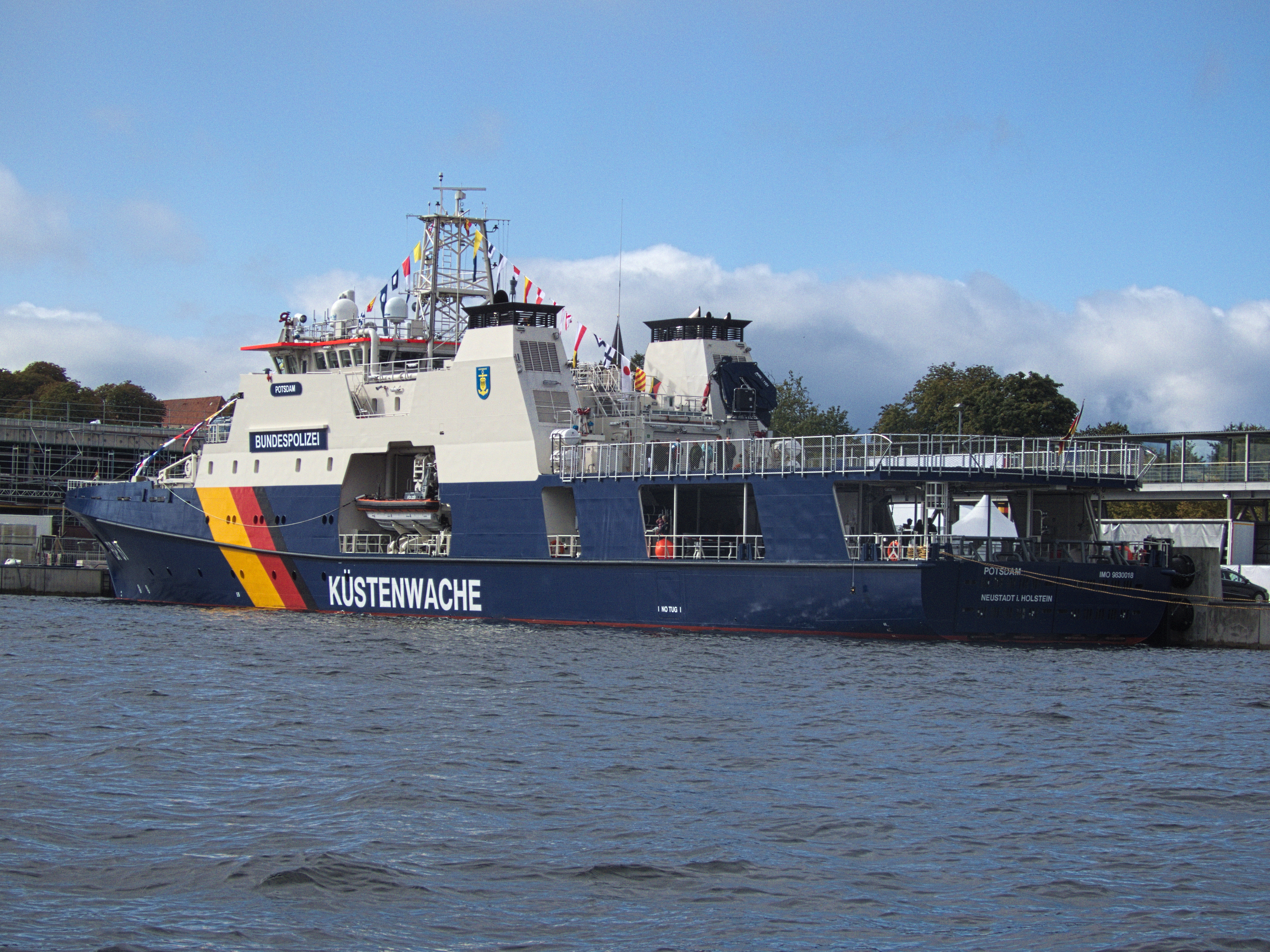
The large offshore patrol vessel Potsdam

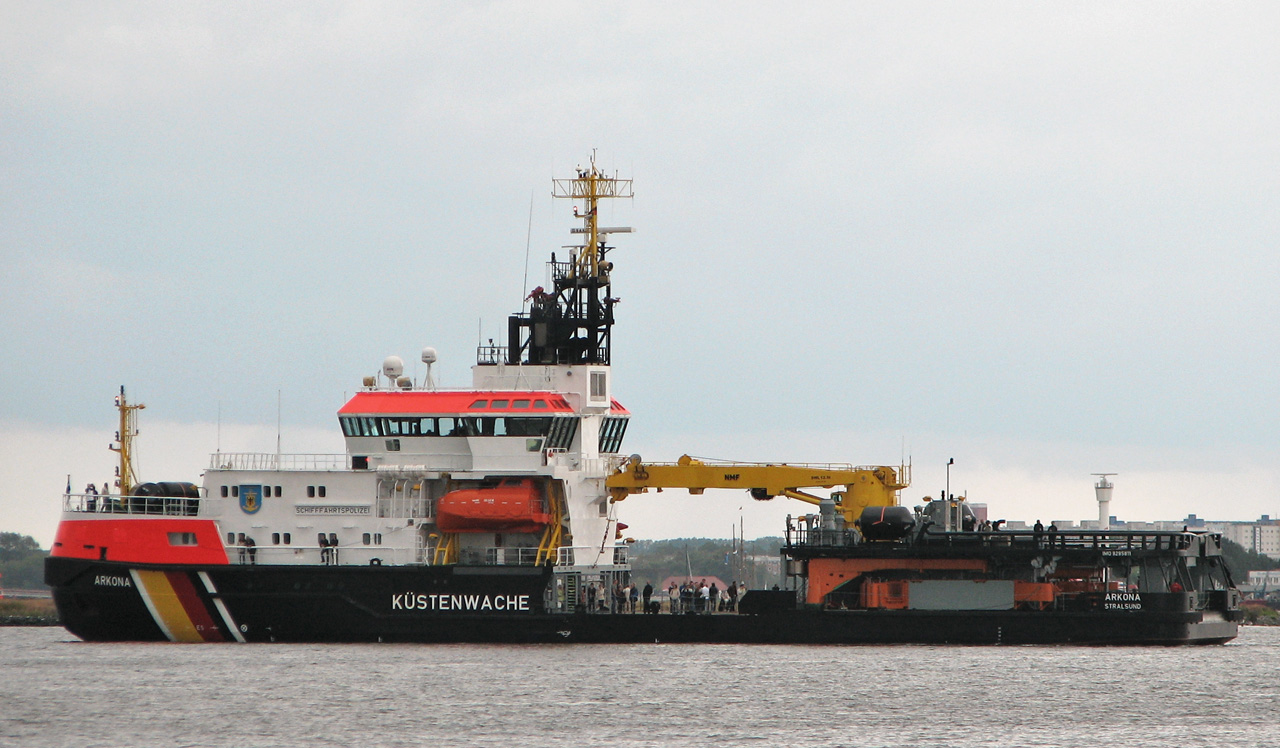
The multi-purpose vessel Arkona

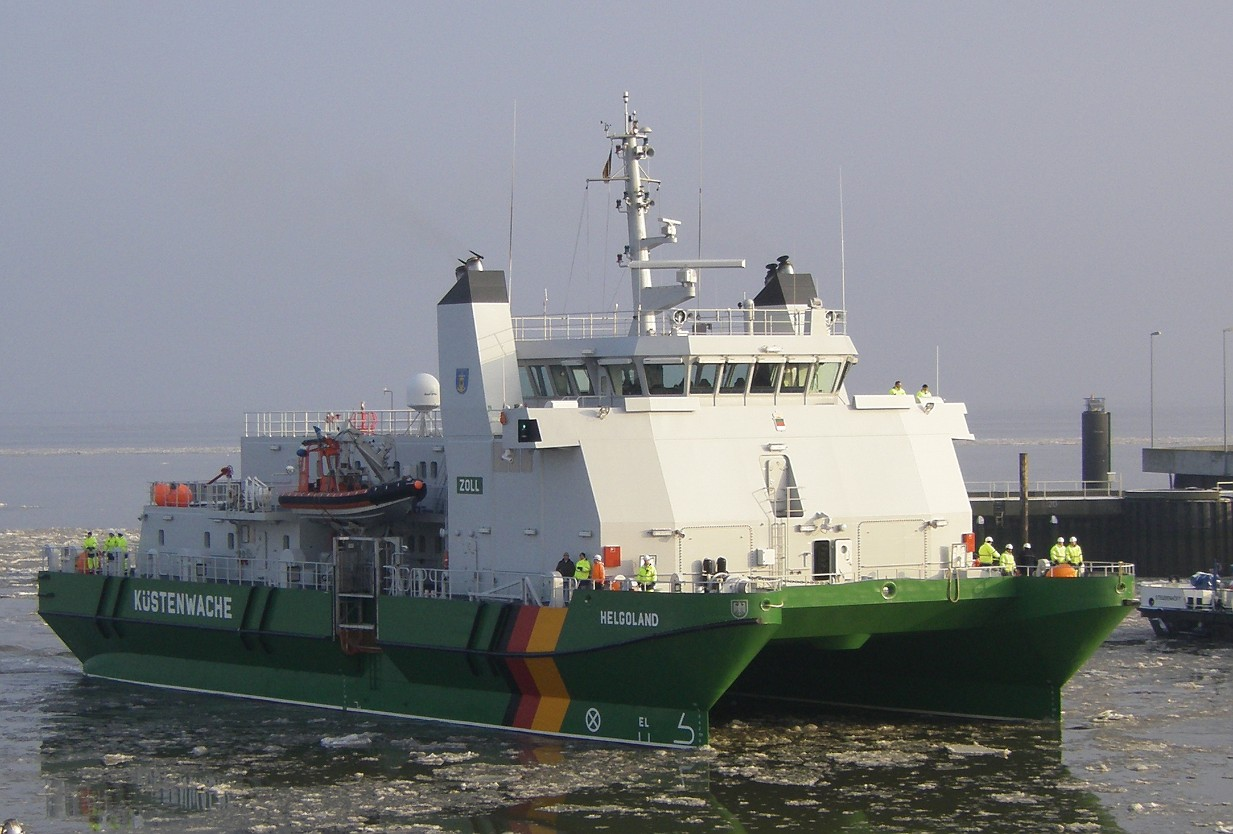
Customs cruiser (Zollkreuzer) Helgoland (a SWATH vessel)

Since 2007 the Joint Situation Center Sea (GLZ-See) is in service. GLZ-See is coordinating the operational units of the federal government (Küstenwache) and the coastal states of Germany (Wasserschutzpolizei).

Units and personnel from these federal agencies make up the coast guard:

- Bundespolizei (Federal Police), Ministry of the Interior
- Waterways and Shipping Offices, Federal Waterways and Shipping Administration (WSV), Federal Ministry for Transport, Construction and Urban Development
- Kontrolleinheit See (Maritime Customs Service), Federal Customs Administration, Federal Ministry of Finance
- Federal Agency for Agriculture and Nutrition (BLE), Federal Ministry of Consumer Protection, Food, and Agriculture

== Coast guard personnel ==
The personnel serving with the Küstenwache include both police officers (in the case of the Bundespolizei and Wasserzoll) and civilians from the Waterways and Shipping Office and other agencies. Küstenwache personnel do not have combatant status as it is not a military unit as many other coast guards are. In contrast, the United States Coast Guard is both a military service and a law enforcement organisation and its commissioned officers have both police and military powers. However, police officers serving with the Küstenwache retain their usual police powers, adjusted to the maritime nature of their job.

== Ships and other vessels ==
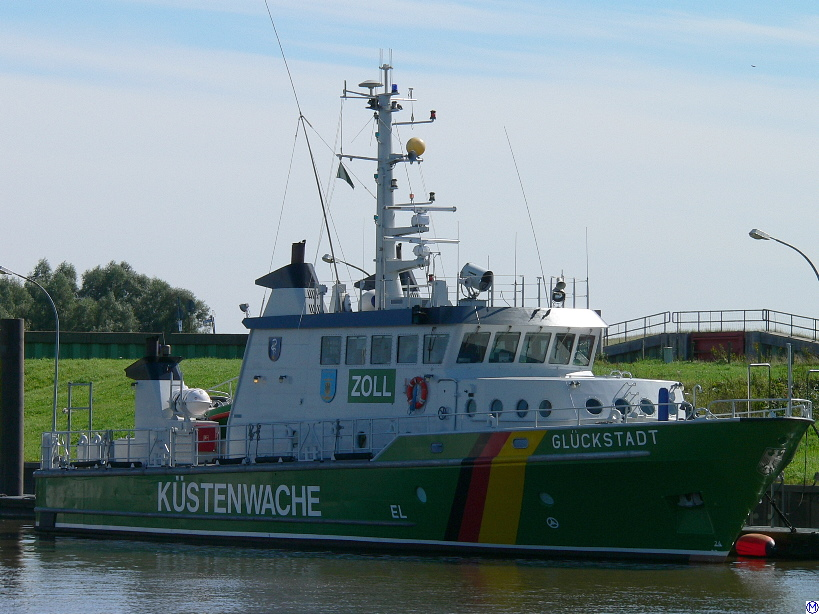
Customs cruiser Glückstadt

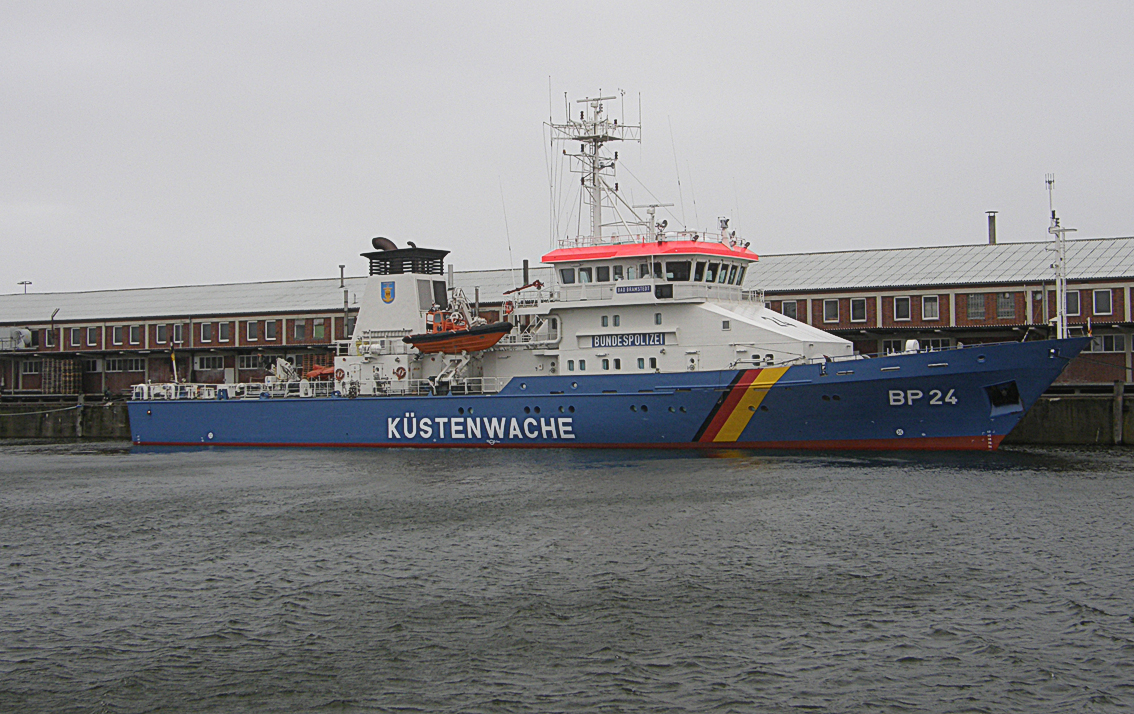
Bad Bramstedt

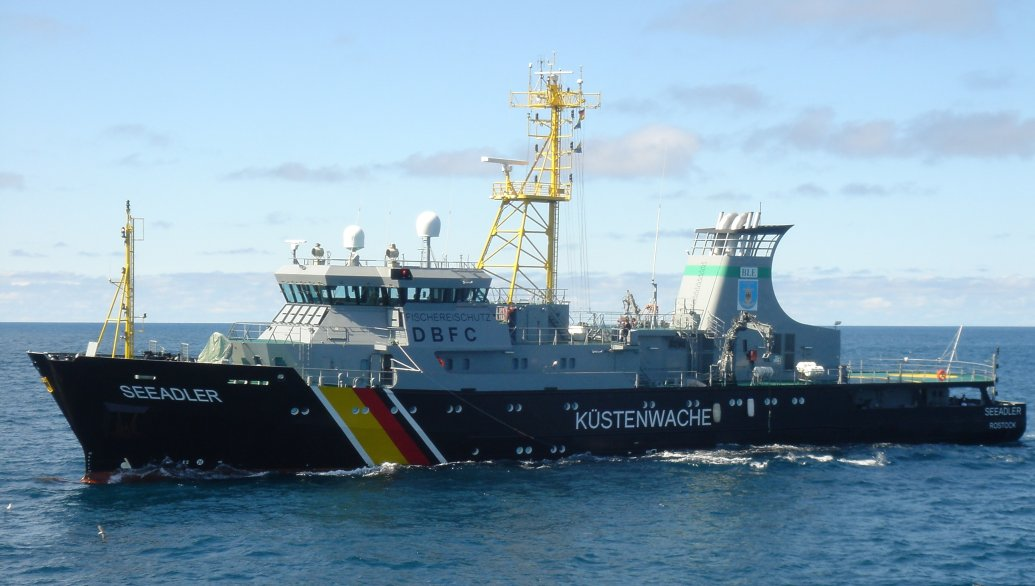
Fishery protection vessel Seeadler

A total of 27 ships and boats from the aforementioned institutions are in operation (Bundespolizei: six ships; Wasserzoll: eight customs cutters, four customs cruisers; WSV: three multi-purpose ships; BLE: two fishery protection boats, three fishery research ships).

The ships are all marked with the legend "Küstenwache" as well as a black-red-gold signet on the hull and the coast guard's coat-of-arms. However, the hull colour differs from agency to agency: blue for the Bundespolizei, green for the Zoll and black for the WSV and BLE.

A number of helicopters and planes are in use as well.

Some ships:

- Bad Bramstedt
- Bayreuth
- Eschwege
- Potsdam
- Bamberg
- Bad Düben
- Priwall
- Kalkgrund
- Seeadler
- Hamburg
- Mellum

== Ranks ==
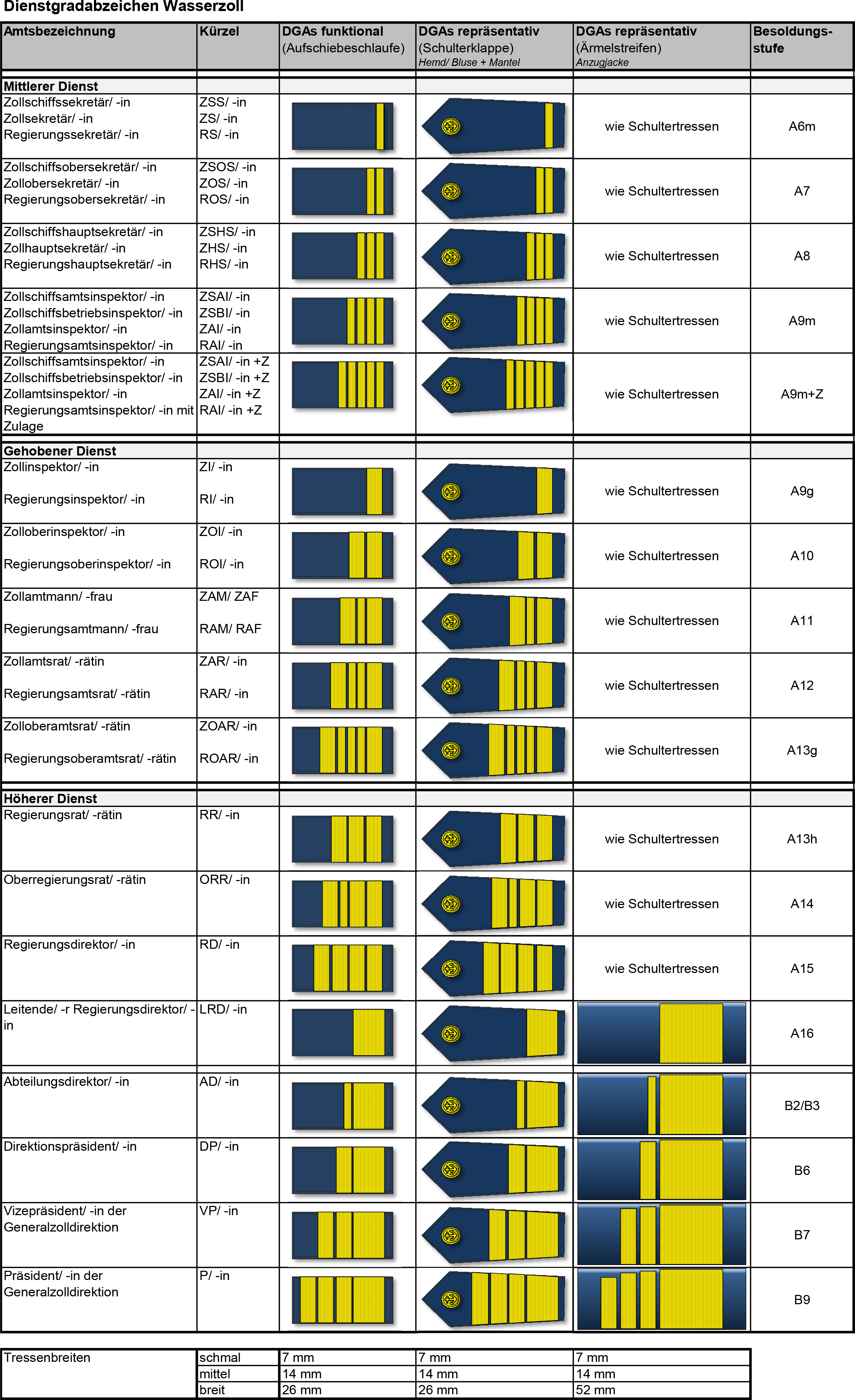
Official titles (ranks): From top to bottom; middle service to senior service.

== See also ==
- Law enforcement in Germany
- German Navy
- German Maritime Search and Rescue Service
