= Federal Police (Germany) =

Federal law enforcement agency of Germany

Federal Police Bundespolizei
- Federal Police patch

- Agency logo of the Federal Police

- Federal Police badge
- Common name: Bundespolizei (Federal Police)
- Abbreviation: BPOL

Agency overview
- Formed: 16 March 1951 (75 years ago) as Bundesgrenzschutz, since 1 July 2005 named Bundespolizei
- Employees: 51,315 (1 September 2020)
- Annual budget: €4.729 billion (2021)

Jurisdictional structure
- Federal agency: Germany
- Operations jurisdiction: Germany
- General nature: Federal law enforcement; Civilian police

Operational structure
- Headquarters: BPOL-Präsidium, Potsdam
- Police officers: 42,885
- Civilians: 8,430
- Agency executive: Dieter Romann, Präsident des Bundespolizeipräsidiums
- Parent agency: Federal Ministry of the Interior and Community
- BPOL-Direktions: 11: • Bad Bramstedt covering Schleswig-Holstein and Mecklenburg-Vorpommern; • Hanover covering Bremen, Hamburg and Lower Saxony; • Sankt Augustin covering North Rhine-Westphalia; • Koblenz covering Saarland, Rheinland-Pfalz and Hesse; • Stuttgart covering Baden-Württemberg; • Munich covering Bavaria; • Pirna covering Saxony, Saxony-Anhalt and Thuringia; • Berlin covering Berlin and Brandenburg; • Frankfurt International Airport; • Fuldatal covering the Raid Police; • Direktion 11 (Berlin) covering GSG9, Fliegergruppe and other special forces

Facilities
- Motor vehicles: 7,032
- Boats: 3 (+1 on order) offshore vessels, 3 patrol boats
- Helicopters: 94
- Service dogs: 460
- Service horses: 21

Website
- (German)

The Federal Police (German: Bundespolizei, [ˈbʊndəspoliˌtsaɪ], BPOL) is the national and principal federal law enforcement agency of the Federal Government of Germany. It is subordinate to the Federal Ministry of the Interior and is responsible for land and maritime border control, law enforcement at airports and on the railway system, and the protection of federal institutions. Before 1 July 2005, the agency was known as the Bundesgrenzschutz (Federal Border Guard). It operates separately from the state police forces (Landespolizei), which are responsible for general law enforcement within each of Germany's 16 federal states.

== Missions ==
The Bundespolizei is responsible for:

- Border security, including passport control at Germany's external Schengen borders (air, sea, and any land borders on the Schengen Area's external frontier), as well as at internal borders during periods when temporary border controls are reinstated under Schengen rules.
- Transport security at international airports and on the German railway system.
- Operating the federal air marshal service.
- Operating the GSG 9 counter-terrorism unit.
- Providing mobile federal support forces for major internal security incidents.
- Protecting certain federal buildings, including Schloss Bellevue and the Federal Constitutional Court and Federal Court of Justice in Karlsruhe.
- Supporting international police missions for the United Nations and the European Union in locations such as Kosovo, Sudan, Liberia, Afghanistan, the Gaza Strip, Moldova, and Georgia.
- Providing security personnel for selected German embassies.
- Operating federal rescue helicopters for medical emergencies, search‑and‑rescue missions, and disaster response.

The Bundespolizei can also be used to reinforce state police if requested by a state (Land) government. The BPOL maintains these reserve forces to deal with major demonstrations, disturbances or emergencies, supplementing the capabilities of the State Operational Support Units. Several highly trained detachments are available for crisis situations requiring armored cars, water cannon or other special equipment.

BPOL investigators conduct criminal investigations only within its jurisdiction; otherwise the cases are referred to the appropriate state police force or to the federal criminal investigative agency, the Federal Criminal Police (Bundeskriminalamt, BKA).

In addition, the Bundespolizei cooperates closely with German state executive authorities, such as prosecutor's offices (Staatsanwaltschaft) in pursuing criminal investigations.

=== Restoration of border control tasking on all borders (2015) ===
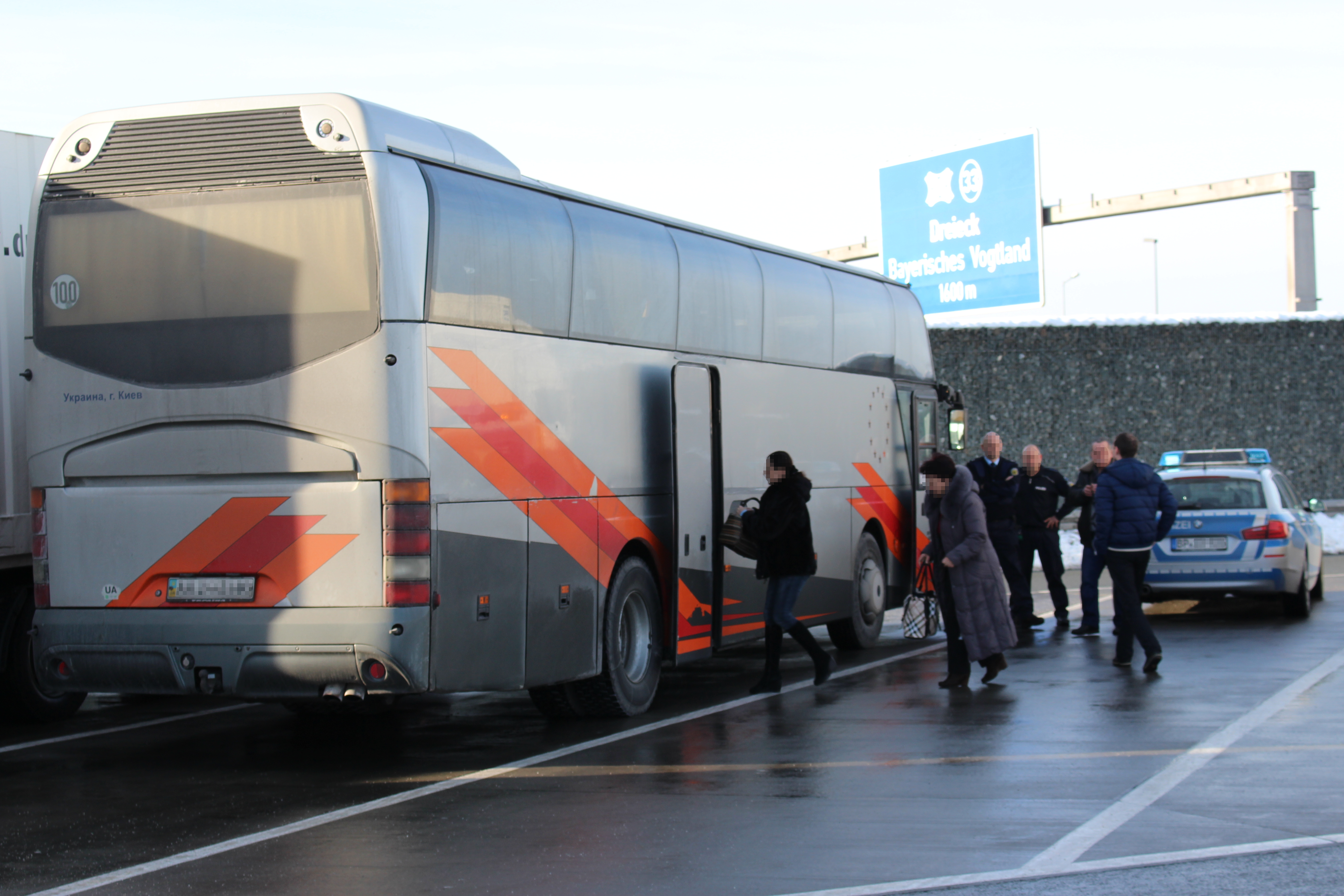
German Federal Police inspect a Ukrainian coach and its passengers at the Lipperts rest area on Autobahn 9, northbound

On the night of 13 September 2015 Germany unilaterally reintroduced border controls, under emergency provisions of the Schengen Agreement, due to the 2015 European migrant crisis overwhelming Germany's available resources, law enforcement and otherwise.

The nominally temporary border controls were initially put in place just on the border with Austria, but by the following day (Monday 14 September 2015) they were being put in place at all borders with fellow EU members.

The same day, Austria and other EU members who were part of the Schengen Area began to put in place their own border controls (again meant to be temporary) in response to Germany's actions.

The new German border controls are to be primarily enforced both by the various Landespolizei of those German states that adjoin external borders, and in particular by the Bundespolizei.

== Organization ==
Bundespolizei districts of Germany

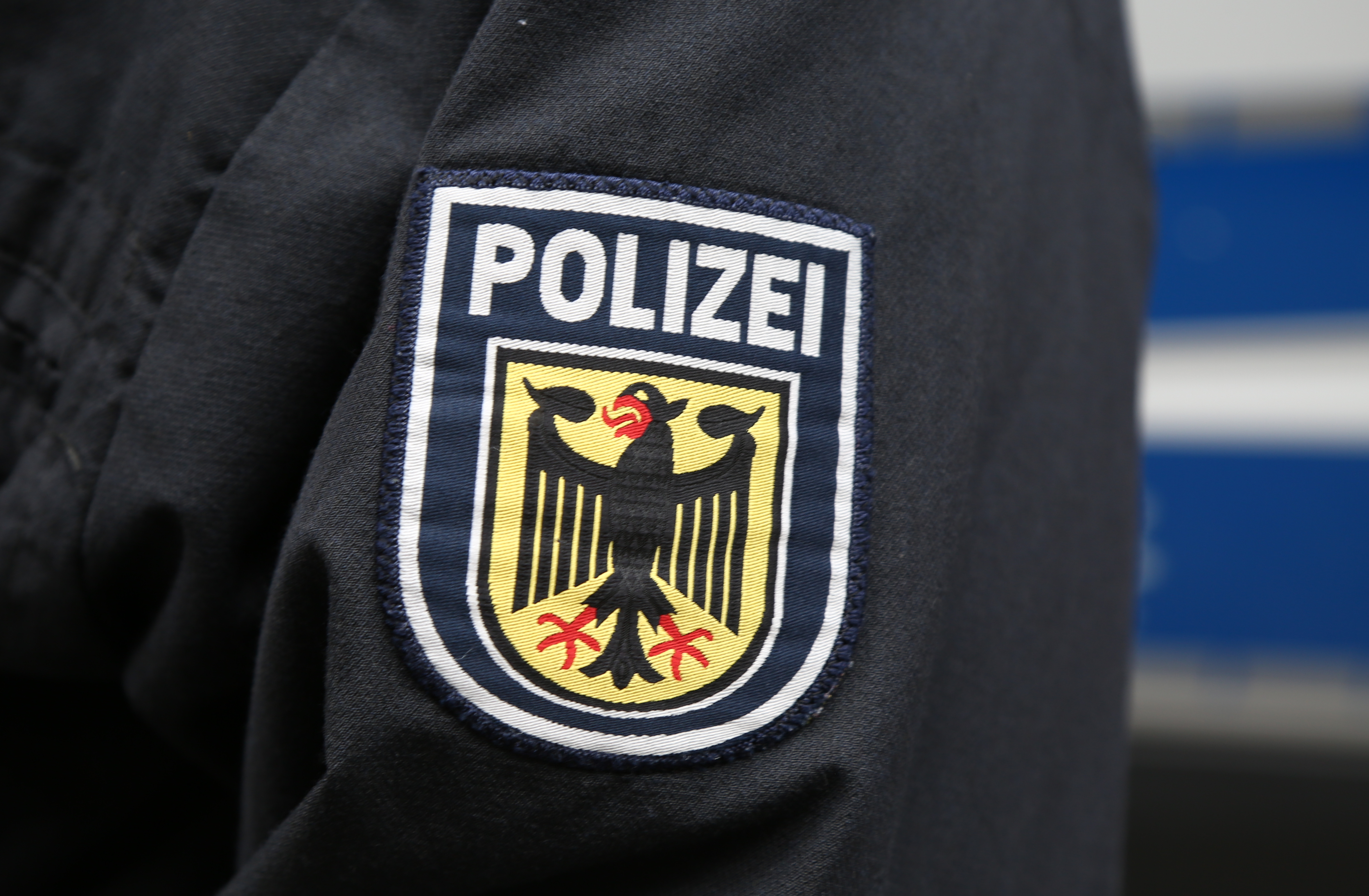
Uniform sleeve patch of the German Federal Police

The BPOL national headquarters (BPOL-Präsidium) in Potsdam performs all central control functions. Eight regional headquarters (BPOL-Direktion) control the BPOL stations that conduct rail police and border protection missions. These areas of responsibility conform to the federal state boundaries which they did not do prior to 1 March 2008.

The regional headquarters are as follows:

- Bad Bramstedt covering Schleswig-Holstein and Mecklenburg-Vorpommern as well as the North Sea and Baltic Sea as part of the German Federal Coast Guard.
- Hanover covering Bremen, Hamburg and Lower Saxony.
- Sankt Augustin covering North Rhine-Westphalia.
- Koblenz covering Saarland, Rhineland-Palatinate and Hesse.
- Stuttgart covering Baden-Württemberg.
- Munich covering Bavaria.
- Pirna covering Saxony, Saxony-Anhalt and Thuringia.
- Berlin covering Berlin and Brandenburg.

These regional headquarters each have an investigation department and a mobile inspection and observation unit. Moreover, they control the 67 BPOL stations (BPOL-Inspektion) which in turn control the Bundespolizeireviere or precincts located in places that require a 24-hour presence by BPOL officers.

A special Direktion is responsible for Frankfurt International Airport.

The central school for advanced and vocational training is in Lübeck and controls the six basic training schools in Swisttal, Neustrelitz, Oerlenbach, Walsrode, Eschwege and Bamberg. It is also in charge of the Federal Police Sport School in Bad Endorf and a competitive sport project in Kienbaum near Berlin. The sport school specialises in winter sport events and has trained many of Germany's top skiers and skaters such as Claudia Pechstein.

The Zentrale Direktion Bundesbereitschaftspolizei controls the mobile support and rapid reaction battalions located in Bayreuth, Deggendorf, Blumberg (near Berlin), Hünfeld, Uelzen, Duderstadt, Sankt Augustin, Bad Bergzabern, Bad Düben and Ratzeburg. The number of Bereitschaftspolizei companies increased in March 2008 from 28 to 29 comprising approx. 25 percent of Germany's police support units.

=== Strength ===
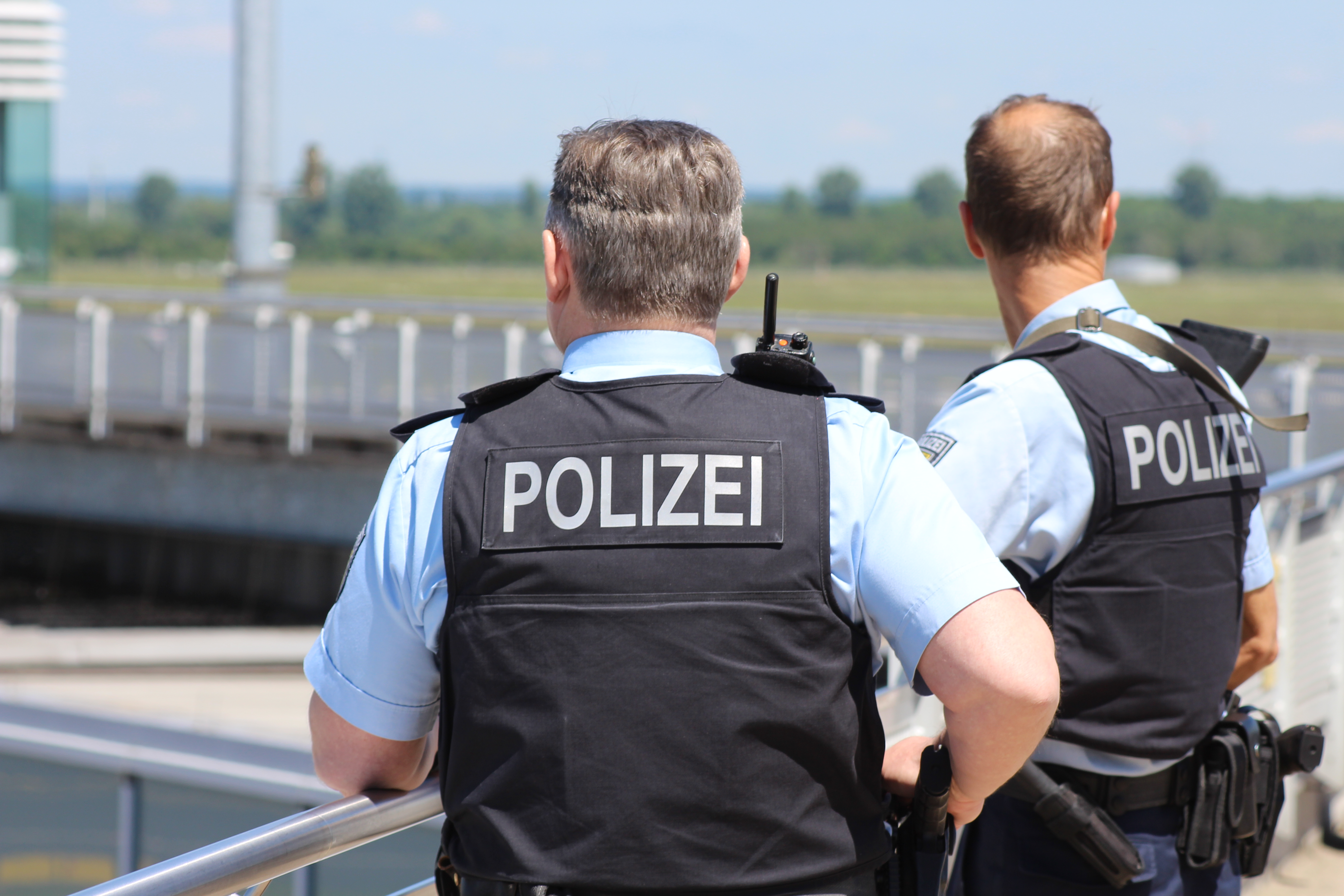
Federal Police Officers at Düsseldorf Airport

The Bundespolizei as at 1 September 2020 consists of 51,315 personnel:

- 34,670 are fully trained law enforcement officers
- 8,215 candidates
- 8,430 salaried civilian (unarmed) support personnel

=== BPOL Special Units ===
The following special units also exist:

- The BPOL Aviation Group is subordinate to the Bundespolizei Direktion 11 (BPOLD 11) in Berlin. It controls the five aviation squadrons around the country that operate the force's helicopters. These are located in Fuhlendorf (north, with satellite airfield in Gifhorn), Blumberg (east), Fuldatal (centre), Oberschleißheim (south) and Sankt Augustin (west). Its duties include; border surveillance, monitoring installations belonging to Deutsche Bahn, helping in serious accidents and disasters in Germany and abroad, searching for missing persons, searching for criminals on the run, supporting the police forces of the federal states, providing transportation for persons whose security is endangered, providing transportation for guests of the Federal government, supporting federal and state authorities, and providing air search and rescue services in coordination with the 12 air rescue centers throughout Germany.
- The BFE+ units (abbreviated from Securing of Evidence and Arrest of Suspects) are a specialized division of regular BPOL arresting units. These units were organized after the 2015 Charlie Hebdo attacks in France with the aim of responding faster and with higher firepower to massive terrorist attacks. BFE+ units are decentralized and work as a first response force until the more specialized and centralized GSG9 arrive at the scene, and are equipped similarly to SEK units.
- The GSG 9 counter-terrorism group is directly subordinate to the BPOL HQ.
- The BPOL Information and Communications Center is now a department of the BPOL HQ in Potsdam.
- Most special units of the Federal Police are subordinate to the unified command of Federal Police Directorate 11.
- The water police stations with 16 patrol craft and helicopters are part of the German Federal Coast Guard and assigned to coastal BPOL stations. The watercraft include six offshore patrol vessels, e.g. those of the Bad Bramstedt class, and the large Potsdam class as well as a number of fast inshore vessels and one tugboat.

== History ==
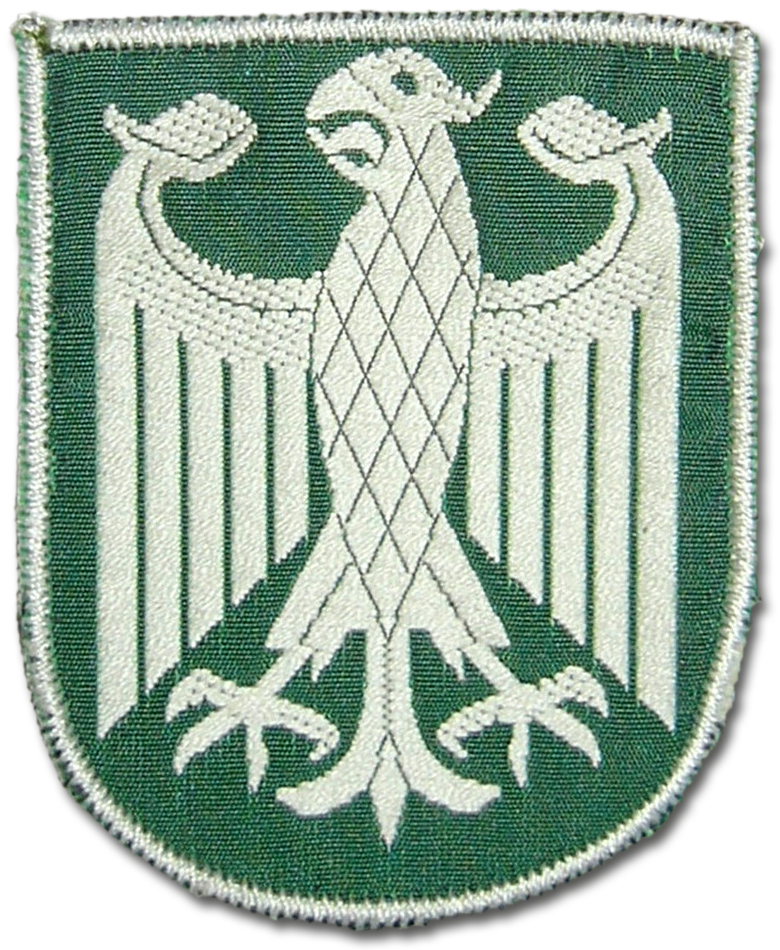
Early green sleeve patch of the Bundesgrenzschutz (Federal Border Guard), used 1952–1976

In 1951, the West German government established the Federal Border Guard (Bundesgrenzschutz or BGS) composed of 10,000 men under the Federal Interior Ministry's jurisdiction. The force replaced allied military organisations such as the U.S. Constabulary then patrolling West Germany's borders. The BGS was described as a mobile, lightly armed police force for border and internal security despite fears that it would be the nucleus of a new German army. When West Germany did establish an army, the Bundeswehr, BGS personnel were given the choice of staying in the BGS or joining the army. Most decided to join the army.

In 1953, the BGS took control of the German Passport Control Service. In 1972 the Compulsory Border Guard Service was enacted by the parliament, which – in theory – is still in force, but suspended, similar to the conscription for the Bundeswehr. In 1976, the state police grades replaced the military rank structure and BGS training was modified to closely match that of the state police forces (Landespolizei). The West German Railway Police (Bahnpolizei), formerly an independent force, and the East German Transportpolizei were restructured under the BGS in 1990.

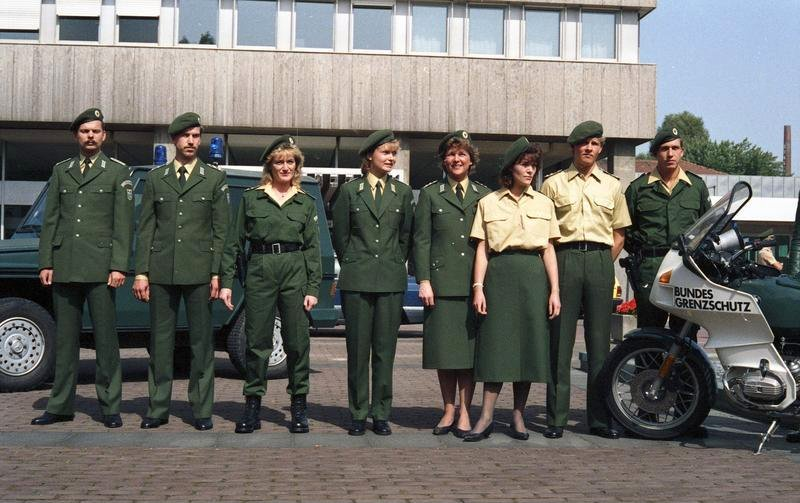
Bundesgrenzschutz officers in 1987

In July 2005, the BGS was renamed the Bundespolizei or BPOL (Federal Police) to reflect its transition to a multi-faceted federal police agency. The change also involved a shift to blue uniforms and livery for vehicles and helicopters. The German Interior Ministry reviewed the structure of the BPOL in 2007 and in March 2008 made the structure leaner to get more officers out of offices and onto patrol.

== Equipment ==
=== Vehicles ===
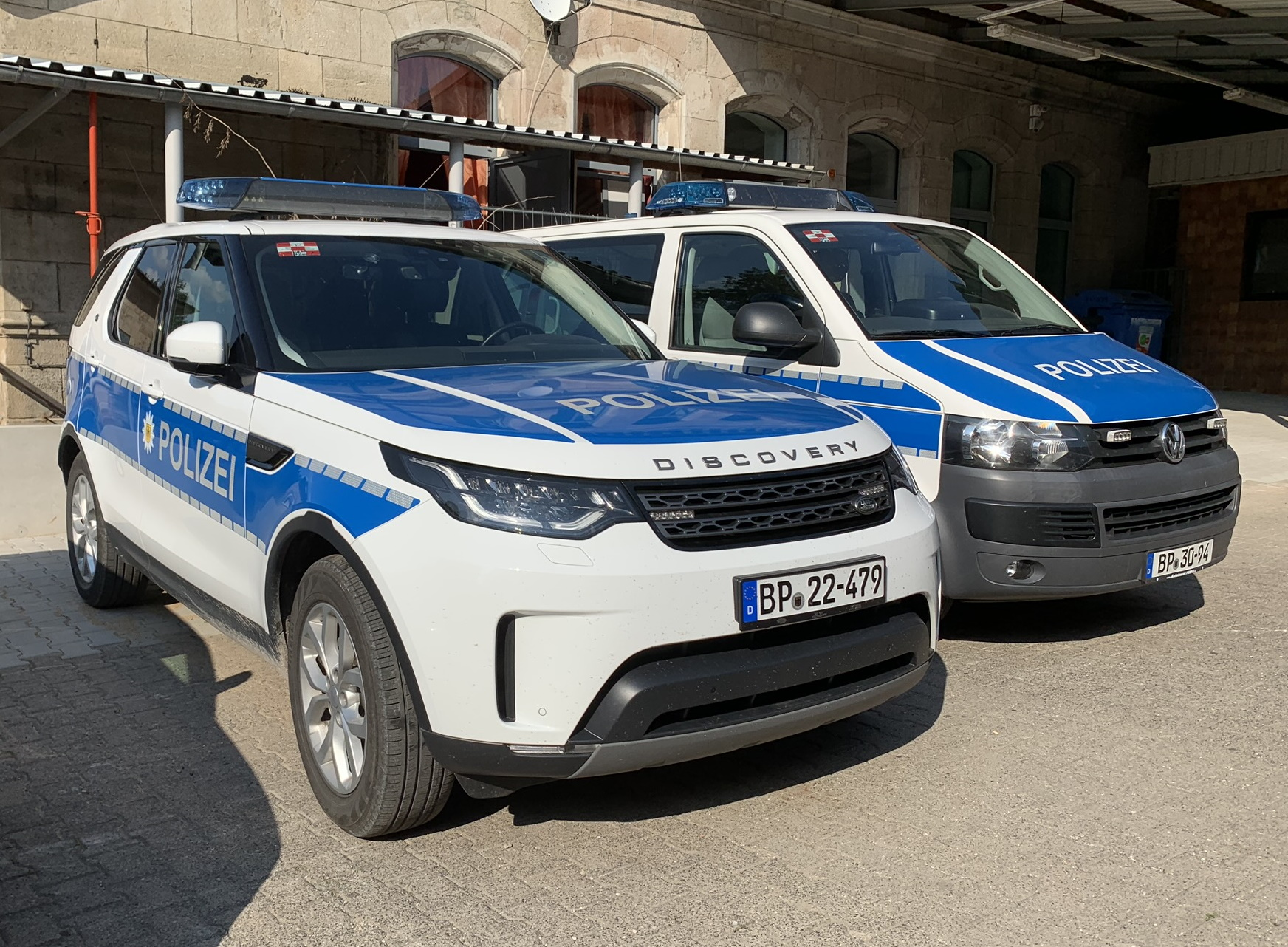
Federal Police Land Rover Discovery and Volkswagen Transporter

Today, German police forces generally lease patrol cars from a manufacturer, usually for a period of three years. Bundespolizei vehicles have number plates that are based on the BP XX-YYY system. BP stands for Bundespolizei. Older vehicles may still have the BGS "BG" plates.

=== Weaponry ===
This is the main weaponry utilized by the Federal Police:

Model	Type	Origin
Heckler & Koch P30	Semi-automatic pistol	Germany
Heckler & Koch MP5	Submachine gun	Germany
Heckler & Koch G36	Assault rifle	Germany

=== Aircraft inventory ===
The Federal Police now has been reduced to three flight amenities pattern of 94 helicopters. This is the largest civilian helicopter fleet in Germany.

Aircraft	Type	Versions	In service
Eurocopter EC-120	training helicopter	EC 120	10
Eurocopter Super Puma	transport helicopter	AS 332 L1	19
Eurocopter EC 135	utility helicopter	EC 135	24
Eurocopter EC 155	transport helicopter	EC 155 B	19

In May 2024, it was announced that Airbus Helicopters will supply 38 new H225 Super Pumas to replace the 19 AS 332 and 19 EC 155 helicopters from 2025 onwards.

==== Former aircraft ====
Aircraft	Type	Versions	In service
Aérospatiale Alouette II	training and utility helicopter	SA 318C	–
Aérospatiale Puma	transport helicopter	SA 330	–
MBB Bo 105	rescue helicopter	Bo 105CBS	–

=== Ships ===
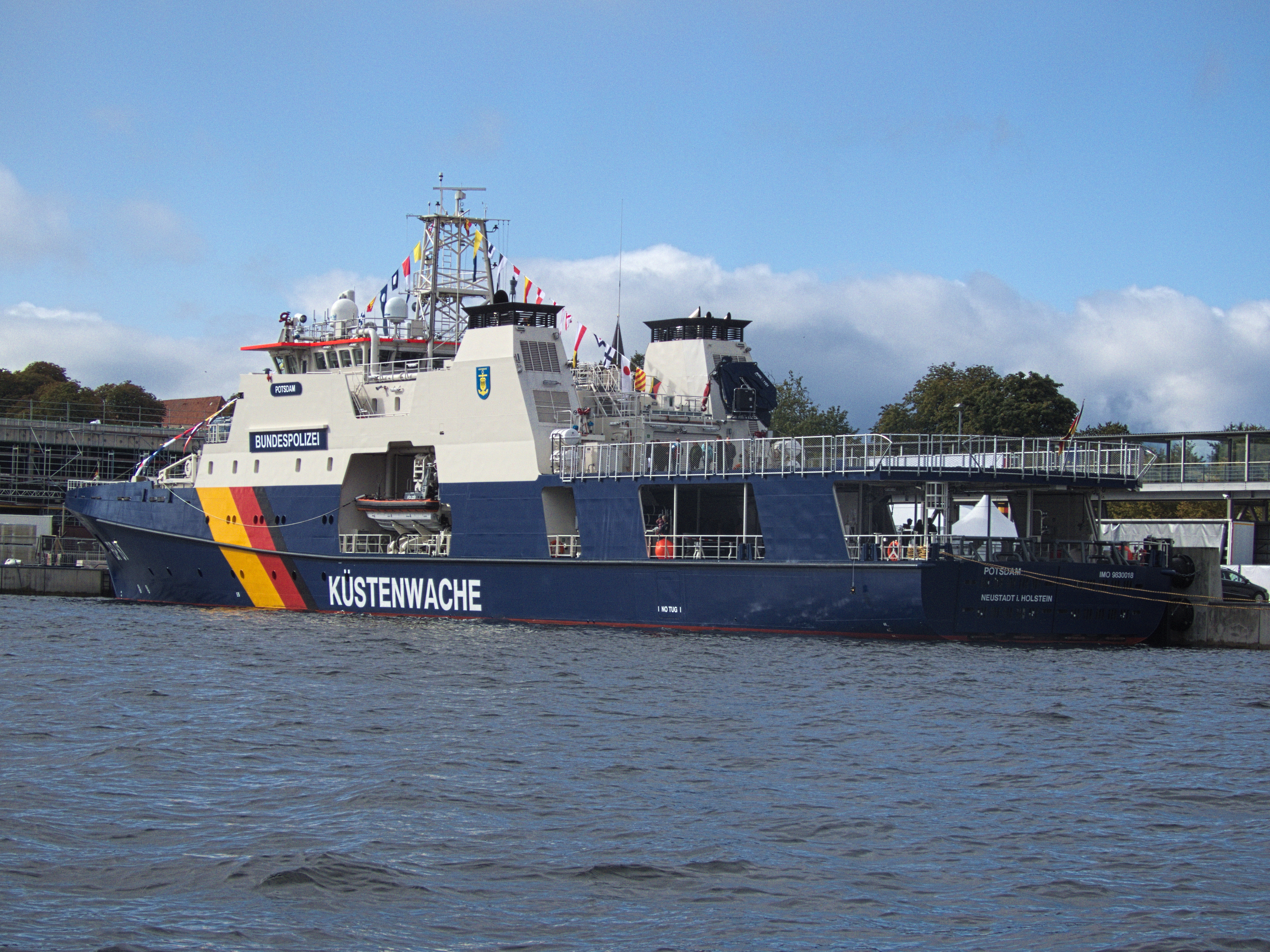
Large offshore patrol vessel BP 81 Potsdam

BPOL provides the federal police element of the German Federal Coast Guard.

Ship	Call	deployed port	Length	Commissioning
Bad Bramstedt	BP 24 DBGX	Neustadt in Holstein	66	2002
Bayreuth	BP 25 DBGY	Neustadt in Holstein	66	2003
Eschwege training ship since 04/2024	BP 26 DBGZ	Neustadt in Holstein	66	2003
Potsdam	BP 81 DBBM	Cuxhaven	86	2019
Bamberg	BP 82 DBBO	Rostock	86	2019
Bad Düben	BP 83 DBBP	Cuxhaven	86	2019
Neustadt	BP 84 DBIF	Rostock	86	2023

=== Dogs ===
Approximately 500 working dogs are used in the Federal Police at present. Most of the dogs are German Shepherds. Other dog breeds are also used such as Malinois, German Wirehaired Pointer, Giant Schnauzer, and Rottweiler. They accompany their handlers on daily missions in railway facilities, at airports, at the border or in physical security. Most working dogs live with the families of their handlers. Basic and advanced training is performed under the supervision of the Federal Police Academy at the Federal Police canine schools in Bleckede (Lower Saxony) and Neuendettelsau (Bavaria) where dogs and handlers go through patrol dog and explosive detection courses.

== Ranks ==
Until 2003, the federal police units had rank insignia almost identical to those used by the Schutzpolizei in the Weimar Republic and Nazi Germany (the East German Volkspolizei had until 1990 similar rank insignia, only with a bit different number of stars for respective ranks). In 2003, the federal German police ranks and insignia were unified with those used by police units of federal lands.

Junior ranks (Mittlerer Dienst)

Rank	Translation	Rank insignia	Equivalent rank in the Bundeswehr
Polizeimeisteranwärter (PMA)	Probationary Constable		
Grenzpolizeiliche Unterstützungskraft (GUK); Bundespolizeiliche Unterstützungskraft (BUK); Polizeivollzugsangestellter (PVA)	Border Support Employee; Federal Police Support Employee; Enforcement Support Employee		
Polizeimeister (PM)	Police Constable (paygrade A7)		Feldwebel; Oberfeldwebel
Polizeiobermeister (POM)	Senior Police Constable (paygrade A8)		Hauptfeldwebel
Polizeihauptmeister (PHM)	Police Sergeant (pay grade A9)		Stabsfeldwebel
Polizeihauptmeister mit Amtszulage (PHMmZ)	Police Staff Sergeant (pay grade A9 with increment)		Oberstabsfeldwebel

Senior ranks (Gehobener Dienst)

Rank	Translation	Rank insignia	Equivalent rank in the Bundeswehr
Polizeikommissaranwärter (PKA)	Probationary Inspector		
Polizeikommissar (PK)	Junior Inspector (pay grade A9)		Leutnant
Polizeioberkommissar (POK)	Inspector (pay grade A10)		Oberleutnant
Polizeihauptkommissar A 11 (PHK)	Chief Inspector II (pay grade A11)		Hauptmann
Polizeihauptkommissar A 12 (PHK)	Chief Inspector I (pay grade A12)		Hauptmann
Erster Polizeihauptkommissar (EPHK)	Senior Chief Inspector (pay grade A13)		Stabshauptmann
Erster Polizeihauptkommissar mit Amtszulage (EPHKmZ)	Senior Chief Inspector with Official Allowance (pay grade A13 with increment)		

Command ranks (Höherer Dienst)

Rank	Translation	Rank insignia	Equivalent rank in the Bundeswehr
Polizeiratanwärter (PRA)	Probationary Superintendent		
Polizeirat (PR)	Superintendent ("Counselor") (pay grade A13)		Major
Polizeioberrat (POR)	Senior Superintendent (pay grade A14)		Oberstleutnant
Polizeidirektor (PD)	Director (pay grade A15)		Oberstleutnant
Leitender Polizeidirektor (LtdPD)	Senior Director (pay grade A16)		Oberst
Direktor in der Bundespolizei (als Abteilungsleiter im Bundespolizeipräsidium)	Director (Division Chief at Federal Police Headquarters) (pay grade B3)		Brigadegeneral
Präsident der Bundespolizeiakademie	President of the Federal Police Academy (pay grade B4)		Brigadegeneral
Präsident einer Bundespolizeidirektion	President of a Federal Police Directorate (pay grades B3–B6)		Generalmajor
Präsident der Bundespolizeidirektion Sankt Augustin; Vizepräsident beim Bundespolizeipräsidium	President of the Federal Police Directorate in Sankt Augustin (pay grade B5); Vice President of the Federal Police Headquarters (pay grade B6)		Generalleutnant
Präsident des Bundespolizeipräsidiums	President of the Federal Police Headquarters (pay grade B9)		General

== See also ==
- Law enforcement in Germany
- Bundeszollverwaltung – Federal Customs Services
- Landespolizei – German state police
- Volkspolizei – Former East German police
