= Maid of Athens, ere we part =

1810 poem by Lord Byron

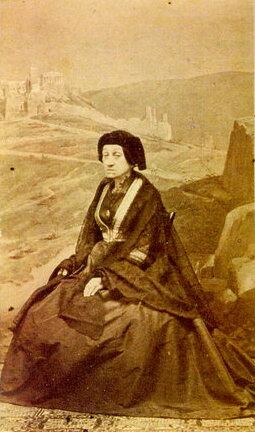
Teresa Makri (Τερέζα Μακρή), the subject of the poem, in 1870.

"Maid of Athens, ere we part" is a poem by Lord Byron, written in 1810 and dedicated to a young girl of Athens.

The poem was first published in the 1812 collection Childe Harold's Pilgrimage: A Romaunt and Other Poems. It was included in the volume along with his major narrative poem, Childe Harold's Pilgrimage, published by John Murray in London.

== Background ==
The poem begins:

Maid of Athens, ere we part,
Give, oh, give me back my heart!
Or, since that has left my breast,
Keep it now, and take the rest!
Hear my vow before I go,
Ζωή μου, σᾶς ἀγαπῶ

— Stanza 1

Each stanza of the poem ends with the same Greek refrain, which Byron translated as "My life, I love you!" It may be viewed as an example of macaronic verse, although it lacks the humorous intent typical of that genre.

One scholar in 1916 argued that Byron had mistranslated the line, and it should in actuality be read as, "My Zoe, I love you."

== History of the poem ==
According to C. G. Brouzas, the subject of Byron's "Maid of Athens" was Teresa Makri, the 12-year-old daughter of Tasia Makri, at whose house Byron lodged briefly in 1809 and in February 1810. Byron claimed to be in love with the child; in a letter to Henry Drury the poet declares to be "dying for love of three Greek Girls at Athens", "Teresa, Mariana, and Kattinka", and wrote the poem for her before departing for Constantinople. On his way back from Turkey to the Morea, on 17 July 1810, he stayed at Makri's house for another ten days, during which time he offered her £500 for her daughter.

Byron never met Teresa again. She eventually married James Black (1803–1868) and died impoverished in 1875 in Athens, Greece.

== Musical settings ==
The poem has been set to music by numerous composers, including Charles Gounod, William Horsley, and Henry Robinson Allen.
