= Bad Bramstedt-class patrol vessel =

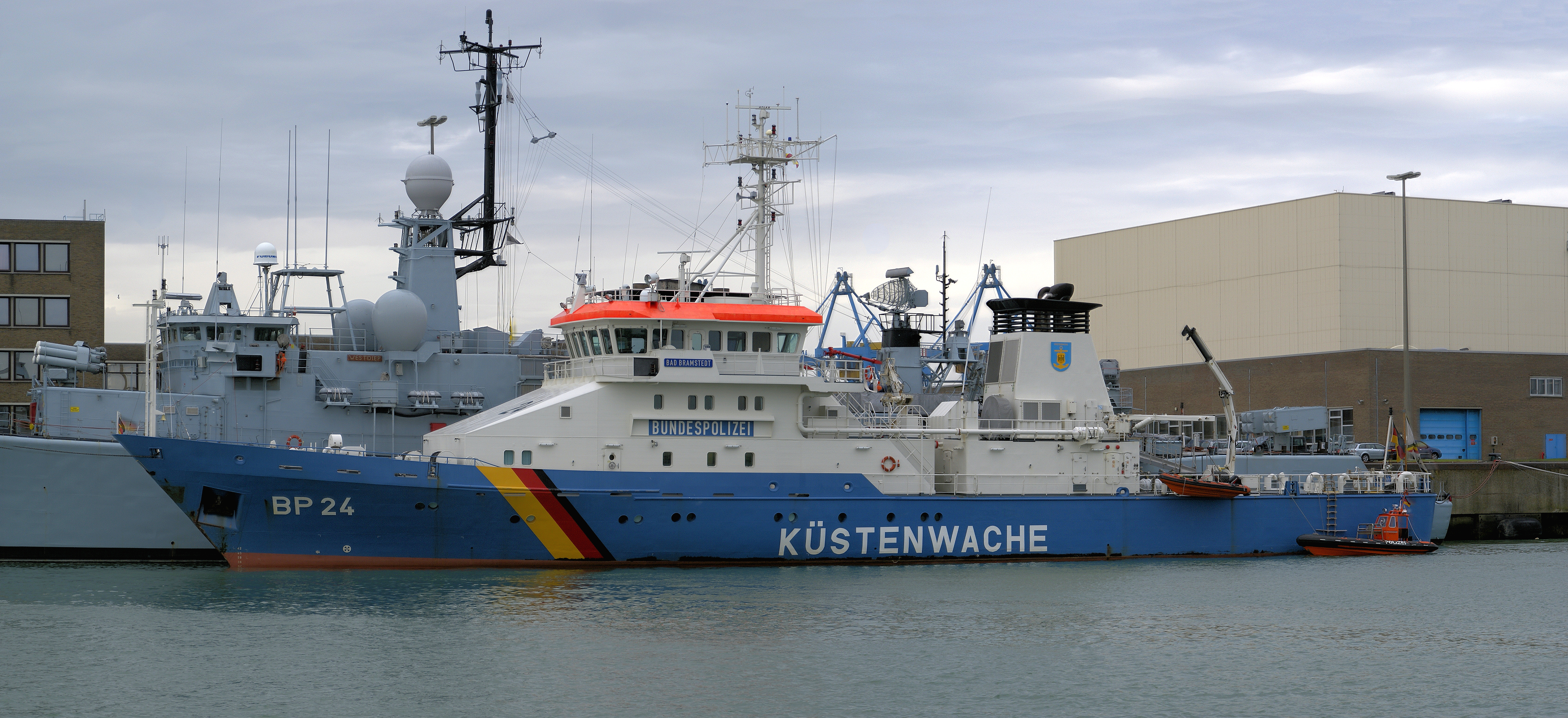
- Bad Bramstedt

Class overview
- Name: Bad Bramstedt class
- Builders: Abeking & Rasmussen, Lemwerder, Germany
- Operators: German Federal Police
- Preceded by: Neustadt class
- In commission: 8 November 2002-present
- Completed: 3
- Active: 3

General characteristics
- Type: Offshore patrol vessel
- Tonnage: 1,030 GT
- Displacement: 880 t (870 long tons)
- Length: 65.9 m (216 ft 2 in)
- Beam: 10.6 m (34 ft 9 in)
- Draught: 3.2 m (10 ft 6 in)
- Installed power: 1 × MTU 16V 1163 diesel 5,200 kilowatts (7,000 hp); 1 × auxiliary diesel, 600 kilowatts (800 hp)
- Speed: 21.5 knots (39.8 km/h; 24.7 mph) (main engine); 12 knots (22 km/h; 14 mph) (auxiliary)
- Complement: 14
- Armament: none

The Bad Bramstedt class is a class of three offshore patrol vessels operated by the Federal Police of Germany. The vessels were ordered in year 2000 to replace the eight boats of the Neustadt class.

Using prefabricated hulls that had been built in the Yantar special economic zone of Kaliningrad Oblast, Russia, the three vessels were completed by Abeking & Rasmussen at Lemwerder, Germany. They are equipped with a diesel hybrid engine for fast speeds and a separate diesel-electric plant for an efficient cruising speed. The eponymous vessel Bad Bramstedt was commissioned on 8 November 2002 with a pennant number BG 24. Two other boats, Bayreuth (BG 25) and Eschwege (BG 26) followed on 2 May 2003 and 18 December 2003 respectively. With the transition of the German Federal Border Guard Bundesgrenzschutz into a federal police force (German: Bundespolizei), the pennant numbers were changed to BP 24, BP 25 and BP 26.

Following the 2024 Baltic sea cable disruption Bad Bramstedt was sent by the German government to joining the Danish frigate HDMS Hvidbjørnen in monitoring the suspected Yi Peng 3 at a sea position in Kattegat.

Bad Bramstedt and Bayreuth are based in Cuxhaven in the German Bight while Eschwege operates from Warnemünde in the Baltic Sea.
