= Bundeszollverwaltung =

Customs service of the Federal Republic of Germany

German Customs
- Bundeszollverwaltung
- German Customs logo

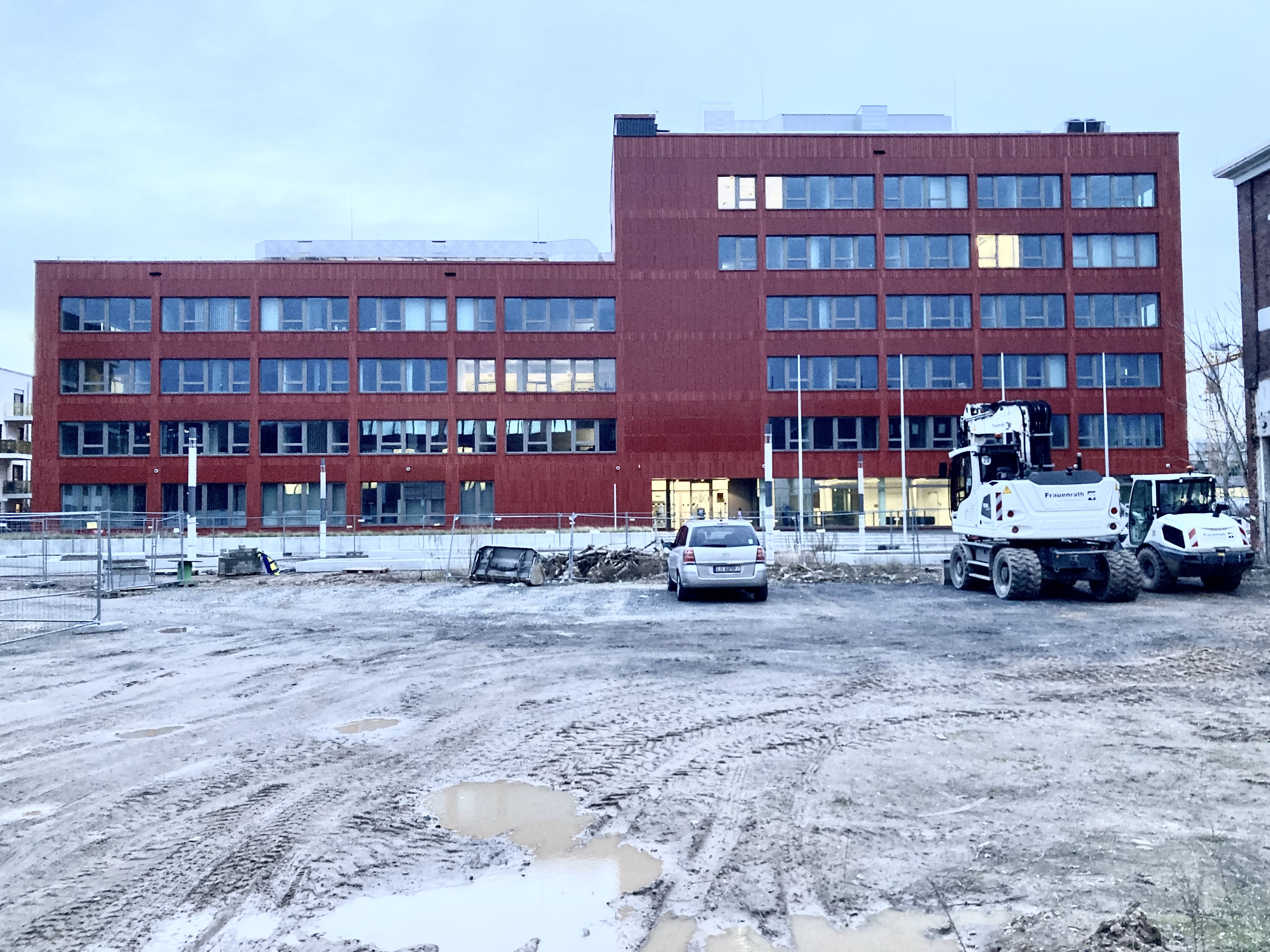

Agency overview
- Formed: 1949
- Type: Customs
- Jurisdiction: Government of Germany
- Headquarters: Bonn; 50.736248954°N 7.0679060636°E
- Employees: 48,000 (2021)
- Parent agency: Federal Ministry of Finance
- Website: www.zoll.de

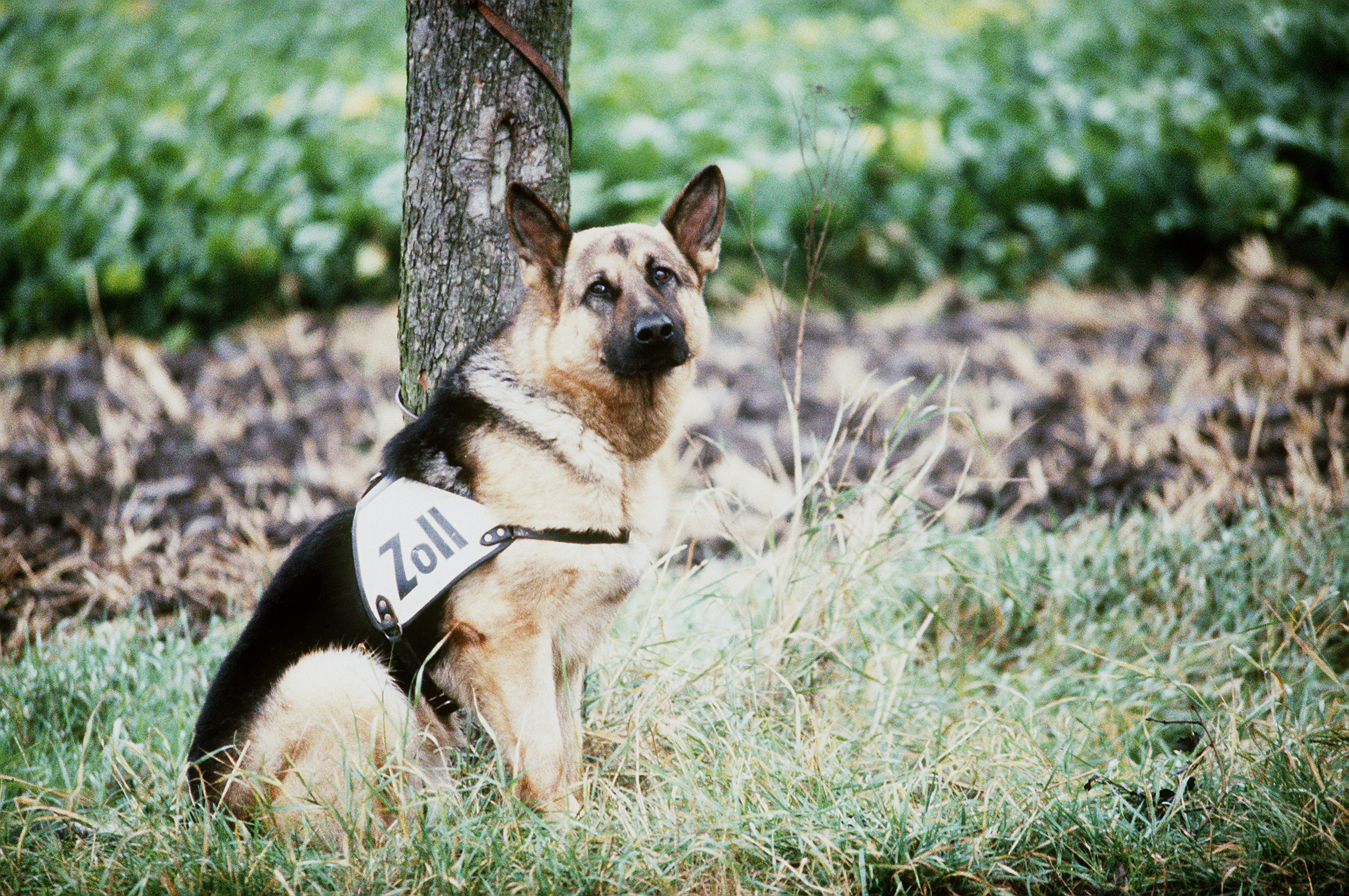
A West German customs dog (Zollhund) on the inner German border in 1984

The Bundeszollverwaltung (Federal Customs Administration or Federal Customs Service) is the customs administration of the Federal Republic of Germany. It is also the executive and fiscal administrative unit of the federal government and part of the Federal Ministry of Finance. It was founded in 1949 in West Germany. The purpose of the Customs Service is to administer federal taxes, execute demands for payment on behalf of the federal government and federal statutory corporations, monitor the cross border movements of goods with regard to compliance with bans and restrictions, and prevent illicit work.

== Mission ==
The Customs Service, as part of the Finanzverwaltung (fiscal administration), ensures the flow of revenue from federal trade tariffs and taxes (excise taxes—Branntwein taxes, electricity taxes, tobacco taxes, energy taxes, etc., including the beer tax, the revenues from which go to the German states), as well as revenues of the European Union (75% of all tariff income goes to the EU, 25% are retained to cover expenses and go to the federal government).

The Customs Service is responsible for monitoring the importing, transit and exporting of goods and monitors compliance with the Convention on International Trade in Endangered Species of Wild Fauna and Flora (CITES). Its core duties include the prevention of the illegal import or export of weapons, drugs and other dangerous substances, as well as other forbidden items.

=== Enforcement agency ===
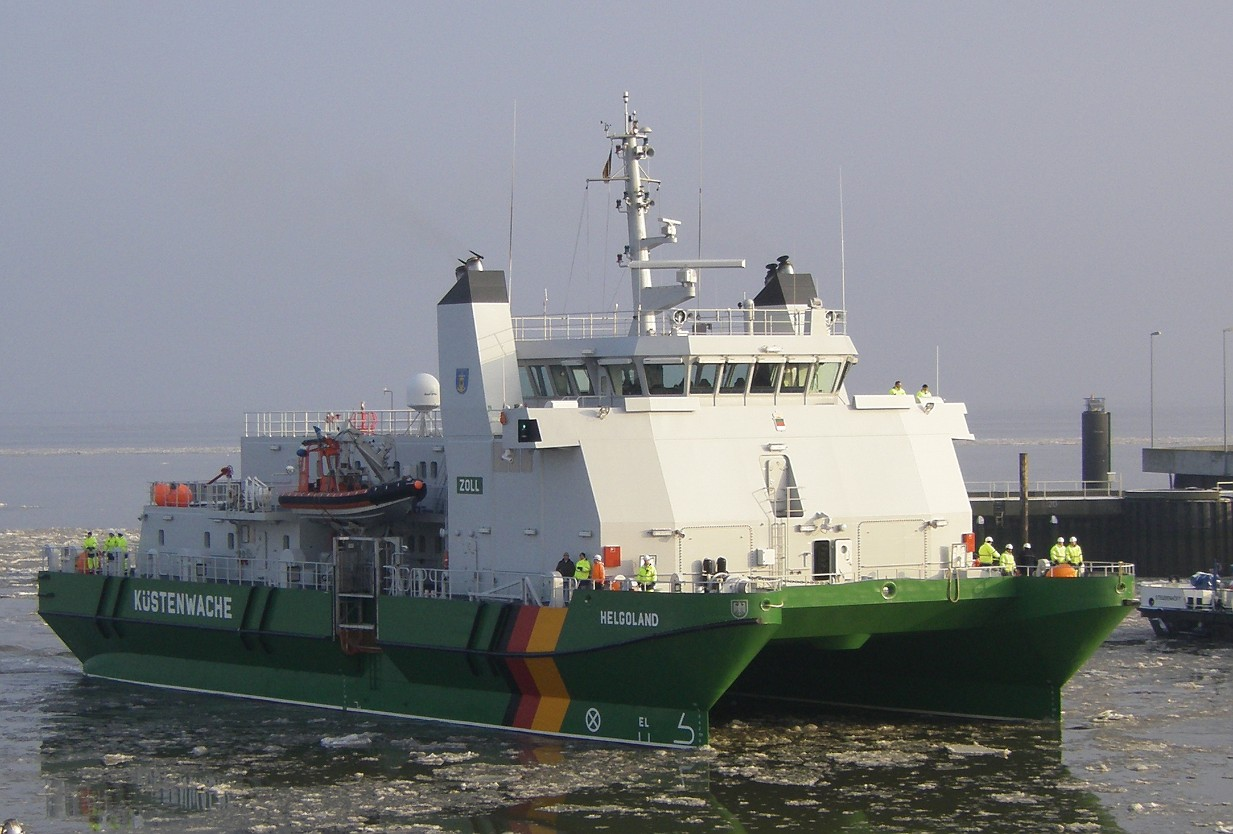
Patrol ship (Zollkreuzer) Helgoland (a SWATH-Vessel)

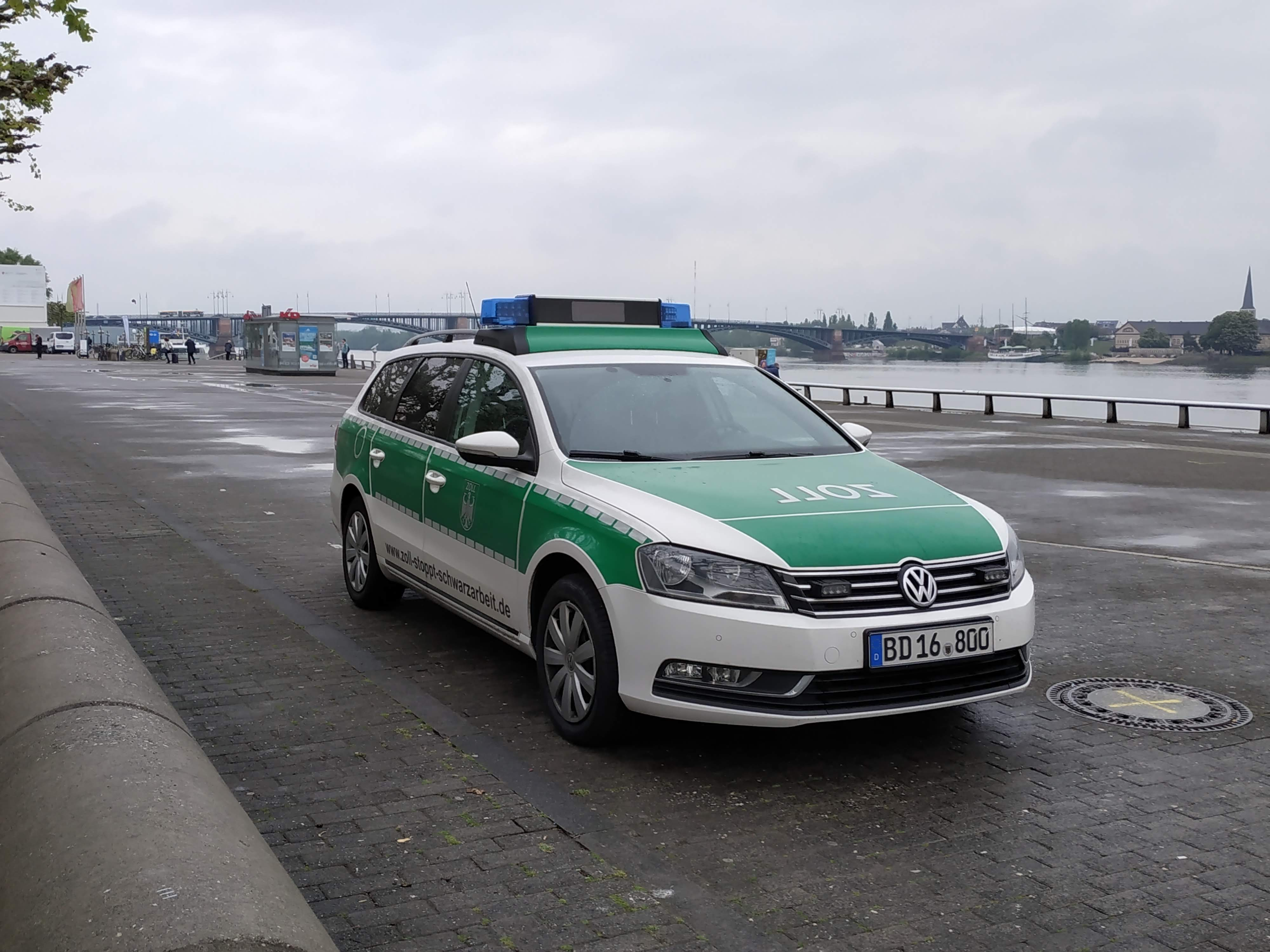
Vehicle of the Bundeszollverwaltung in Germany

The Customs Service's enforcement duties include monitoring the movement of goods into, through and out of the EU with respect to customs law, border police work, general police work in road traffic, protection of the German continental shelf in the North Sea and the Baltic Sea (more precisely, monitoring of underwater mining and exploration rights), as well as the fight against illicit work and money laundering. The Maritime Customs Service together with other agencies makes up the German Federal Coast Guard. The enforcement elements of the Customs Service in many areas cooperate strongly with the police forces of the German states and the federal police. They are law enforcement agencies and are also used to combat terrorism.

=== Execution agency ===
The Federal Customs Service executes demands for payment by the federal government and federal legal persons under public law, for example, the Bundesagentur für Arbeit (the government employment agency). The civil servants in question have the right, just like bailiffs, to impound items and real estate, and to dispose of these.

=== Auctioneer ===
Auctions regularly take place at offices of the Customs Service that are responsible for a certain category of objects. Items are auctioned off that have been impounded or that have been designated for disposal by agencies. Apart from the Customs Service, other agencies and administrations also use this service for auctioning off items. Some objects are excepted from these auctions, namely impounded goods such as:

- Animals and plants: if these are classed as endangered, or threatened by extinction, they fall under the protection of CITES. Dead animals and plants may be left to public institutions for educational and exhibition purposes on demand (e.g. schools, museums, universities); living ones are transferred to zoological or botanical institutions.
- Cigarettes and other tobacco products, as these can only be put on the market if they comply with the provisions of the Tobacco Taxation Law.
- Narcotics (drugs)
- Weapons: if these are of the sort that may be legally sold to those in possession of a permit (and are not classed as military weapons), they will be disposed of directly through the procurement office of the Customs Service in Offenbach am Main.

== Ranks and rank insignia ==
Middle Career Group

Rank insignia	Pay grade	Customs Service Grade	NATO Code
	A 7	Zollobersekretär	OR-7
	A 8	Zollhauptsekretär	OR-7/8
	A 9m	Zollamtsinspektor	OR-8
	A 9m+Z	Zollamtsinspektor	OR-9

Elevated Career Group

Rank insignia	Pay grade	Customs Service Grade	NATO Code
	A 9g	Zollinspektor	OF-1
	A 10	Zolloberinspektor	OF-1
	A 11	Zollamtmann	OF-2
	A 12	Zollamtsrat	OF-2
	A 13g	Zolloberamtsrat	OF-2
	A 13g+Z	Zolloberamtsrat	OF-2

Higher Career Group

Rank insignia	Pay grade	Customs Service Grade	NATO Code
	A 13h	Regierungsrat	OF-3
	A 14	Oberregierungsrat	OF-4
	A 15	Regierungsdirektor	OF-4
	A 16	Leitender Regierungsdirektor	OF-5
	B 2/3	Abteilungsdirektor	OF-5
	B 6	Direktionspräsident	OF-6
	B 7	Vizepräsident der Generalzolldirektion	OF-7
	B 9	Präsident der Generalzolldirektion	OF-8

== See also ==
- Federal Office for Customs and Border Security
