= Ach, wie ist's möglich dann =

Popular German song

"Ach, wie ist's möglich dann" also known as "Treue Liebe" (True/Loyal Love), and “How Can I Leave Thee” is a German now-traditional song. Friedrich Wilhelm Kücken (1810–1882), a German composer and conductor, claimed to have composed the tune, and that it was later modified "probably by Silcher" ("wahrscheinlich von Silcher her") and given the general name Thüringer Volkslied ("Thuringian folksong"). Its popularity helped Kücken get chosen for the court of Paul Frederick, Grand Duke of Mecklenburg-Schwerin. The tune is used at West Point, Lincoln University (Missouri) ("Lincoln, O, Lincoln"), Wake Forest University, and Washington University in St. Louis. Marlene Dietrich sang the song and it has been used in some movies, e.g. Three Comrades uses the melody throughout the film as Leitmotif for love. Similarly, Max Ophüls used it in the same year as a leitmotiv in Le Roman de Werther. It was the theme tune of the radio soap opera Stella Dallas through most of its run (1938--1955). The silent film Ach, wie ist's möglich dann (1913) by Peter Ostermayr bears the song's title.

In early German-American communities the song was adapted into “How Can I Leave Thee” with an English version of the lyrics that suggest the song had become one of familial love and more than that of a couple. It was included in hymnals despite being a secular song.

== Text ==
The lyrics are generally credited to Helmina von Chézy.

Ach, wie ist's möglich dann,
dass ich dich lassen kann,
hab' dich von Herzen lieb,
das glaube mir!
Du hast das Herze mein
so ganz genommen ein,
dass ich kein and're lieb'
als dich allein.

Blau ist ein Blümelein,
das heißt Vergißnichtmein;
dies Blümlein leg ans Herz
und denk an mich!
Stirbt Blüm' und Hoffnung gleich,
wir sind an Liebe reich,
denn die stirbt nie bei mir,
das glaube mir!

Wär ich ein Vögelein,
wollt ich bald bei dir sein,
scheut Falk und Habicht nicht,
flög schnell zu dir;
schöss mich ein Jäger tot,
fiel ich in deinen Schoß;
sähst du mich traurig an,
gern stürb ich dann.

Oh, how is it possible
that I can leave you!
I love you from my heart,
believe that of me!
You have my soul
taken so completely,
that I love no one else
but you alone.

Blue is a little flower,
that is called forget-me-not;
lay this bloom upon your heart
and think of me!
Were flower and hope to die,
we would still be rich in love,
because it would never die in me,
believe that of me.

If I were a little bird,
I would soon be with you,
not afraid of falcon or hawk,
I would fly quickly to you;
if a hunter should shoot me dead,
I would fall onto your lap;
if you would behold me sadly,
I would gladly die.

American Version

How can I leave thee!
How can I from thee part!
That thou hast all my heart,
Sister, believe;
Thou hast this soul of mine,
So closely bound to thine,
No other can I love,
Save thee alone.

Blue is a flow'ret
Called the "Forget-me-not;"
Wear it upon thy heart,
And think of me;
Flow'ret and hope may die,
Yet love with us shall stay,
That cannot pass away,
Sister, believe.

Would I a bird were,
Soon at thy side to be!
Falcon nor hawk would fear,
Speeding to thee;
When by the fowler slain,
I at thy feet should lie,
Thou sadly shouldst complain,
Joyful I'd die.
