= Bleckede =

- Town
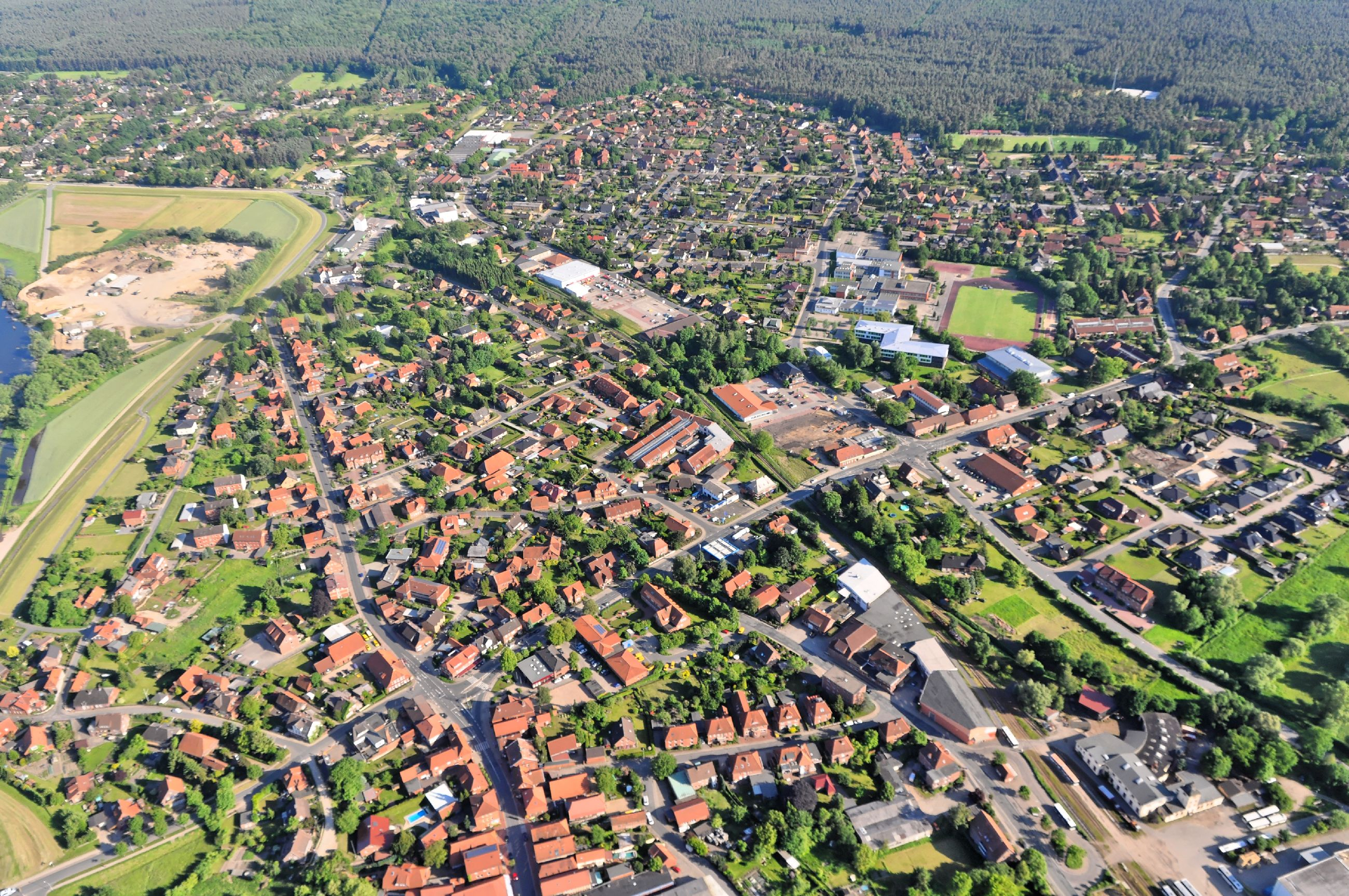
- Aerial view

- Coat of arms

- Location of Bleckede within Lüneburg district
- Interactive map of Bleckede
- Location within Germany Location within Lower Saxony
- Coordinates: 53°18′N 10°44′E
- Country: Germany
- State: Lower Saxony
- District: Lüneburg

Government
  - Mayor (2019–24): Dennis Neumann

Area
  - Total: 140.65 km^{2} (54.31 sq mi)
- Elevation: 6 m (20 ft)

Population (2025-12-31)
  - Total: 9,121
  - Density: 64.85/km^{2} (168.0/sq mi)
- Time zone: UTC+01:00 (CET)
  - Summer (DST): UTC+02:00 (CEST)
- Postal codes: 21354, 19273
- Dialling codes: 038844, 05852, 05854, 05857
- Vehicle registration: LG
- Website: www.bleckede.de

Bleckede (German pronunciation: [ˈbleːkədə]; Polabian Bleketsa) is a town in the district of Lüneburg, in Lower Saxony, in northern Germany. It is situated mostly on the left bank of the Elbe, approx. 20 kilometres (12 mi) east of Lüneburg.

Bleckede is located on the German Timber-Frame Road.

== History ==
=== Middle Ages ===
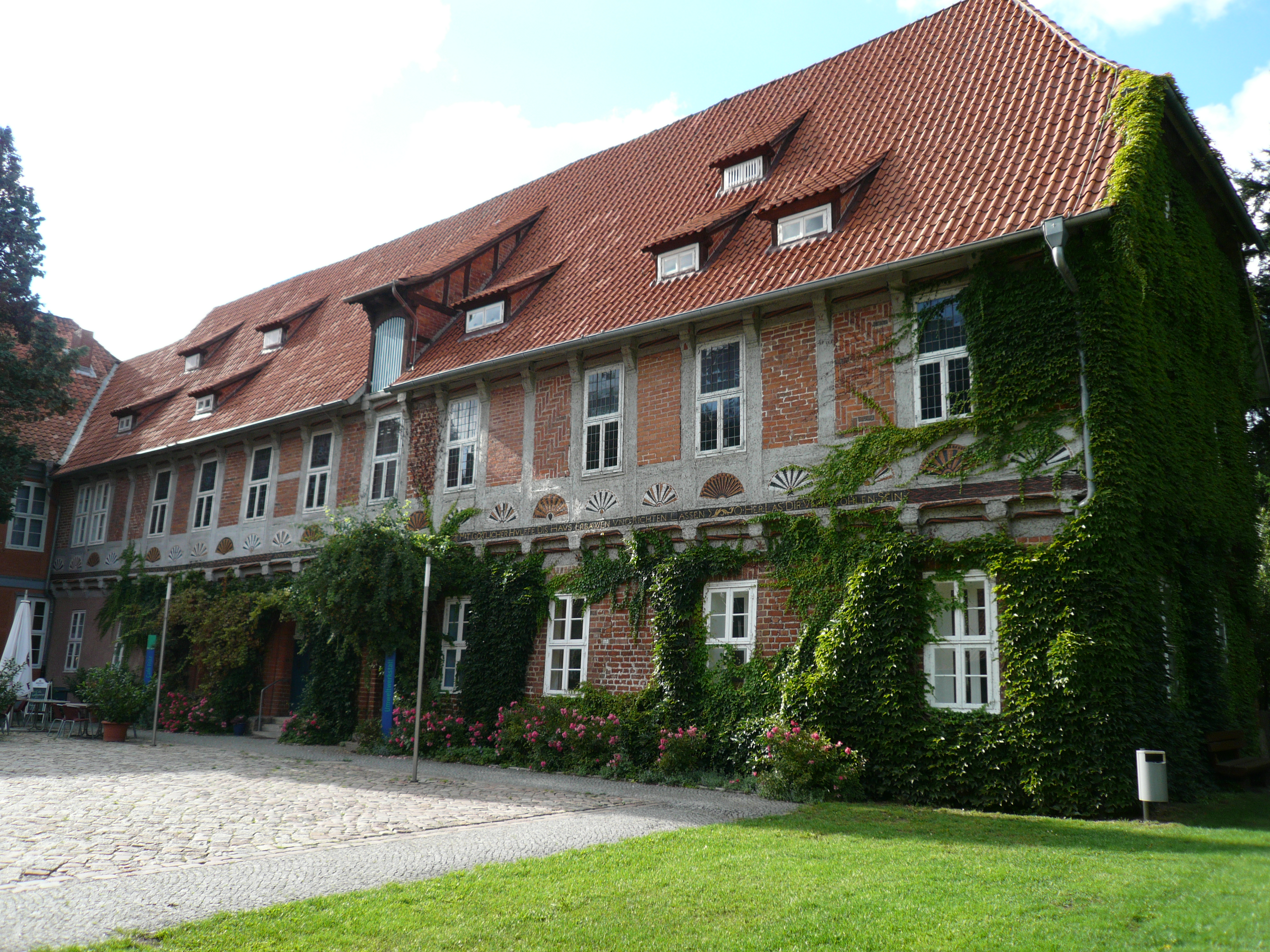
Castle

In the course of the eastern colonisation the area of today's Bleckede became a part of the Duchy of Saxony. The current name derives from an older variant Bleketsa, a Slavic term. After the Welf Saxon, Duke Henry the Lion, had been overthrown and deposed in 1180, the Welfs lost most of Saxony, including the ducal title which was granted to the House of Ascania. The Ascanians also claimed Bleckede. However, Henry's son William of Winchester disputed that claim and made Bleckede the Welf outpost upon Elbe in 1209, in order to have a step towards the trans-Elbian areas which were in the process of colonisation by settlers from the west. William also levied a toll from ships passing Bleckede and renamed the city in honour of his father Lowenstat (Lion's town; Löwenstadt). A castle was erected to protect the Elbe crossing and the toll station. The castle was first mentioned in 1270 and today's castle uses the foundations of the old one.

But the Ascanians did not give up and Duke Albert II of Saxony fought for Bleckede with William's son Otto the Child, who gained the support of Prince-Archbishop Gilbert of Bremen. However, no party could subject the other so they agreed in 1287 to let King Rudolph I of Germany decide. He conceded Bleckede to Saxony, so the Welf name of Lowenstat was dropped and Bleckede prevailed. In 1293 the Saxon dukes granted Bleckede - together with other towns - the privilege of coinage.

The co-ruling Saxon dukes Albert II and his nephews Albert III, Eric I and John II partitioned Saxony into Saxe-Lauenburg and Saxe-Wittenberg before 20 September 1296. Bleckede was then a part of Saxe-Lauenburg, colloquially also called Lower Saxony, as opposed to Upper Saxony for Saxe-Wittenberg.

Saxe-Lauenburg ceded Bleckede - with toll and castle - to Margrave Waldemar of Brandenburg-Stendal, who quickly sold his new acquisition in 1308 to the Welf duke Otto the Strict, ruling the branch Principality of Lunenburg (Lüneburg). Two years later the duke granted Bleckede town privileges, comprising the obligation to fortify the town. In 1379 Duke Albert of Lunenburg-Celle pawned Bleckede castle to his creditors Hamburg, Lübeck, Hanover and Lunenburg (Lüneburg). The latter managed to hold Bleckede by way of pawn until 1600.

=== Modern era ===
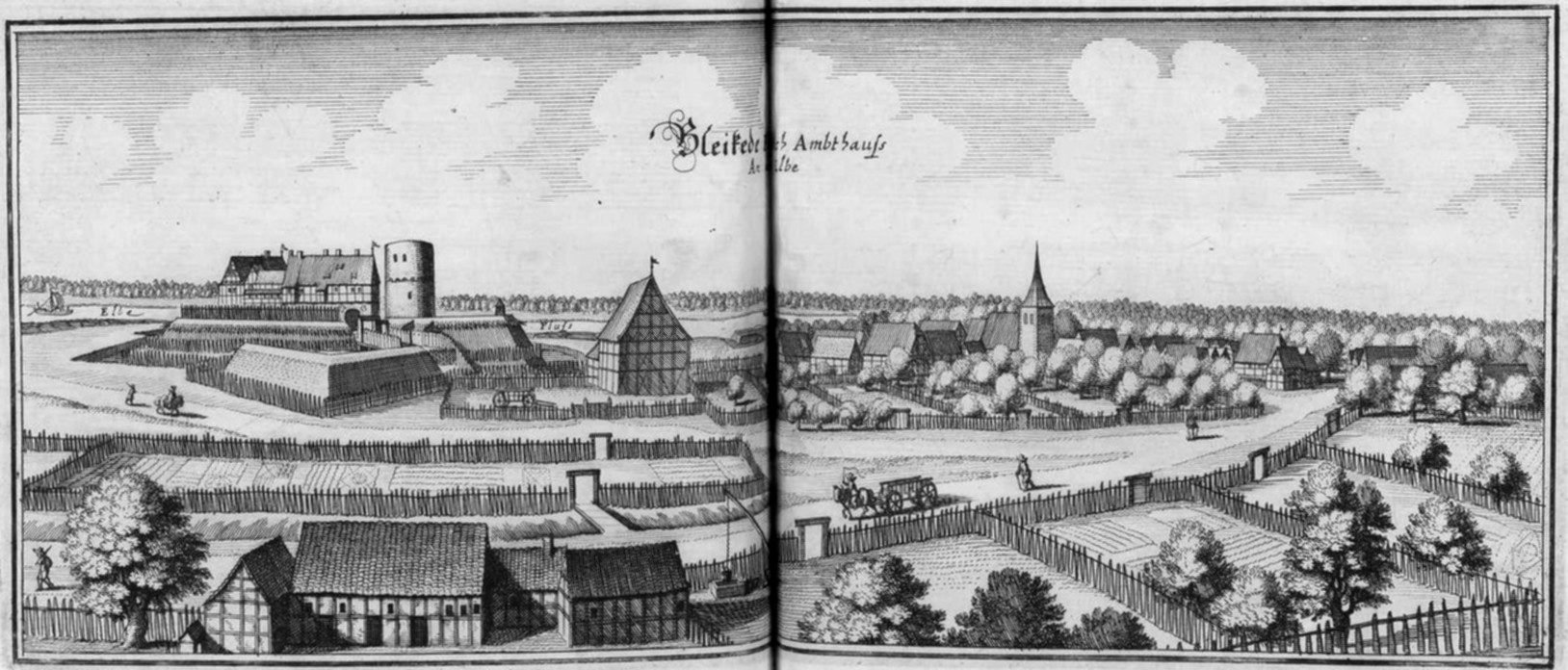
17th-century view of the town

In 1666 Bleckede burnt down almost completely. After the Brunswick and Lunenburgian Duke George William, prince of the branch of Lunenburg (Celle), died in 1705, Bleckede — like all the principality — merged by way of inheritance with the Electorate of Brunswick and Lunenburg, colloquially called after its capital Electorate of Hanover.

After the French victory over the electorate Bleckede was occupied, before it was annexed to the ephemeric Kingdom of Westphalia in March 1810, forming part of its Lower Elbe département. After the Great French War Bleckede was restored to the Electorate of Hanover in 1813, which was elevated to Kingdom of Hanover two years later. After the Prussian annexation of Hanover Bleckede became a part of the new Province of Hanover in 1866. At the introduction of Prussian-style district administration in Hanover on 1 April 1885 Bleckede became the capital of the new Bleckede district, which merged into the District of Lunenburg (Lüneburg) on 1 October 1932.

=== World War II and post-war period ===
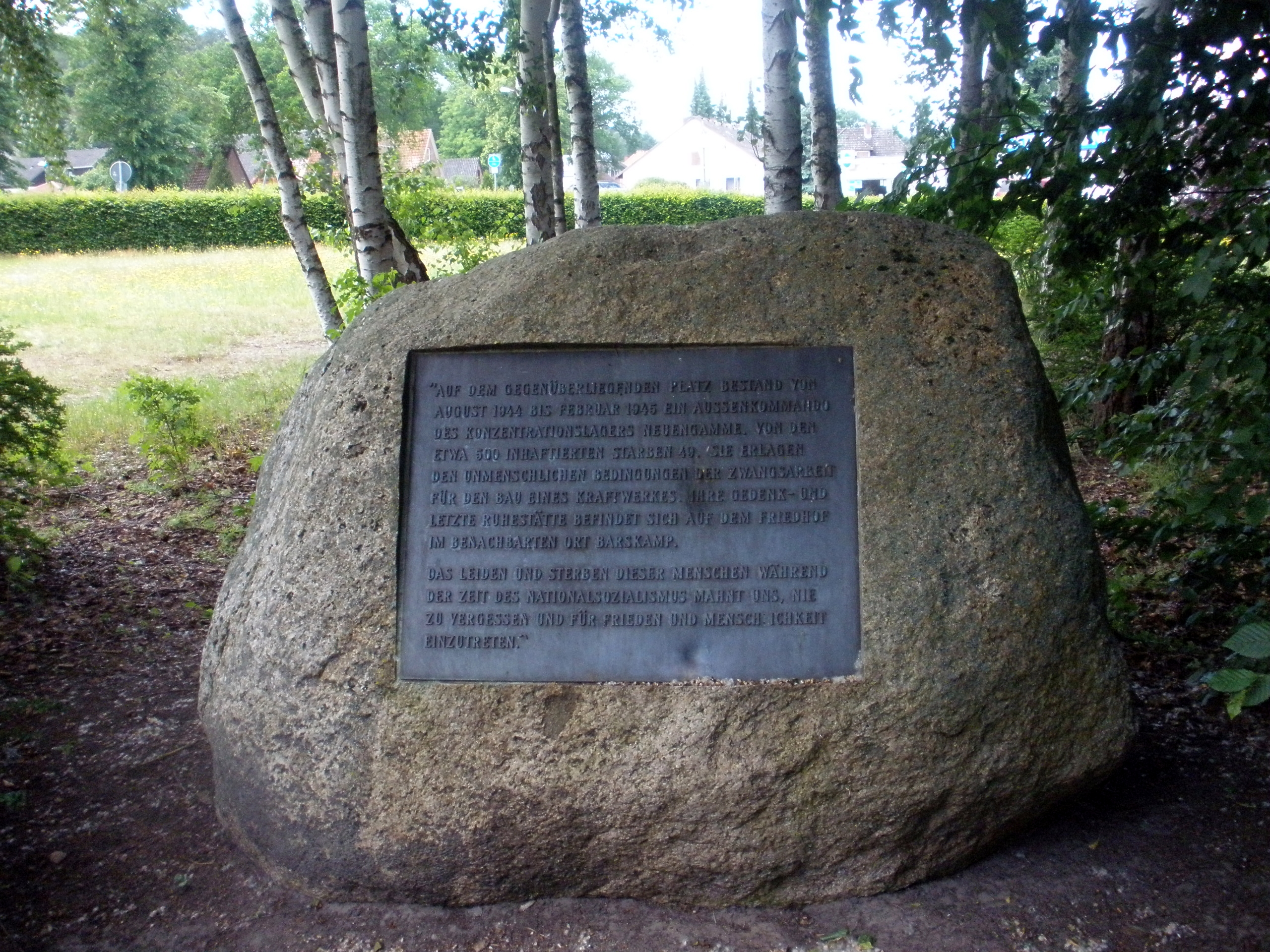
Memorial at the site of the local subcamp of the Neuengamme concentration camp

During the Nazi era the Hanoveran provincial administration was superseded by the Nazi party Gau administration of Eastern Hanover under gauleiter Otto Telschow. A subcamp of the Neuengamme concentration camp existed from August 24, 1944 to February 15, 1945 in the Alt Garge quarter, whose prisoners were mostly Poles deported from Warsaw following the unsuccessful Polish Warsaw Uprising.

With the Allied occupation of Germany the situation changed again. There was no bridge between the bulk of the Hanover province south of the Elbe, being part of the British zone of occupation in Germany, and the small north Elbian quarters of Bleckede, namely Neu Bleckede and Neu Wendischthun, actually also part of the British zone. So the British decided a territorial redeployment and ceded Bleckede's north Elbian quarters to the Soviet Zone of occupation in Germany, state of Mecklenburg, making Bleckede one of the divided towns in a divided Germany. With Mecklenburg that area became part of the East German Democratic Republic in 1949. The East German control zone along the Inner German border, hermetically sealed off since 1952, made the West and the Elbe banks inaccessible for the inhabitants of Neu Bleckede and Neu Wendischthun. Families considered to be living too close to the border were evacuated and their houses demolished.

After World War II the British opened a displaced person camp in their part of Bleckede.

After the downfall of the communist regime in East Germany in 1989 (Die Wende) the inhabitants of Bleckede's north Elbian quarters (part of the new state of Mecklenburg-Hither Pomerania) demanded the reunification with western Bleckede, which belonged since 1946 to the West German state of Lower Saxony.

So both states stipulated in an interstate treaty to disentangle Neu Bleckede and Neu Wendischthun, as well as the neighbouring municipality of Amt Neuhaus from Mecklenburg-Hither Pomerania with effect of 30 June 1993, when they were annexed to Lower Saxony. In a referendum the inhabitants of Amt Neuhaus voted for a merger with Bleckede on 7 June 2009. Bleckede, however, has not decided yet.

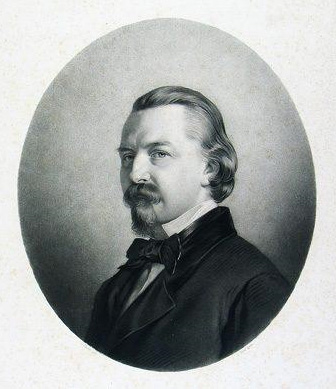
Friedrich Wilhelm Kücken

== Notable people ==
- Friedrich Wilhelm Kücken (1810–1882), composer and conductor
- Auguste von der Decken (1827–1908), novelist and writer
- Ernst Christian Julius Schering (1833–1897), mathematician and publisher
- Hermann Collitz (1855–1935), historical linguist and Indo-Europeanist
- Martin Heinrich Gustav Schwantes (1881–1960), pre-historian, biologist and universal scholar
- Kurt Löwenstein (1885–1939), SPD politician, Reichstag deputy
- Jörg Immendorff (1945–2007), painter, sculptor, stage designer and art professor in Düsseldorf
