= Henry Robinson Allen =

Henry Robinson Allen (1809 – 27 November 1876) was an Irish-born operatic tenor.

== Biography ==
Allen was born in Cork, Ireland and received his musical education at the Royal Academy of Music, London. His debut took place on 11 January 1831, as Basilio in a performance of Mozart's The Marriage of Figaro by the students of the Academy at the King's Theatre. He first attracted public attention by his performance, on 5 February 1842, of Damon on the production of Acis and Galatea (Handel) under William Macready at Drury Lane. In John Edmund Cox's Musical Recollections, he is identified as "the only person worth listening to, in spite of the limited powers of his organ". In 1843, under the same management, he played Acis and Phaon in Giovanni Pacini's opera Saffo, when the heroine on each occasion was Clara Novello, and later in the autumn he played at the Princess's Theatre as Edward III in the English version of Balfe's Le Puits d'Amour.

From that time until the close of John Medex Maddox's management in 1850, Allen was continually engaged at the Princess's, where, owing to its small size, he was heard to advantage. He played in Don Giovanni, Otello, Anna Bolena, Ferdinand Hérold's Marie, La Barcarole, Les Diamants de la couronne, Auber's La Sirène, etc.; Halévy's Le Val d'Andorre; Michael William Balfe's The Castle of Aymon; Edward Loder's Night Dancers. In the early part of 1846 he was engaged at Drury Lane, where he played Basilius on 3 February in George Alexander Macfarren's production of An Adventure of Don Quixote. À propos of this part, Henry Chorley, in the Athenæum, considered him, both as singer and actor, as the most complete artist on the English operatic stage.

Allen retired early from public life, and devoted himself to teaching singing and the composition of ballads, two of which became popular, viz. "Maid of Athens" and "When we two parted". He died at Shepherd's Bush.

== Bibliography ==
- Chitty, Alexis (1900). "Allen, Henry" . In Grove, George (ed.). A Dictionary of Music and Musicians. London: Macmillan and Company.
