= Friedrich Wilhelm Kücken =

German composer and conductor

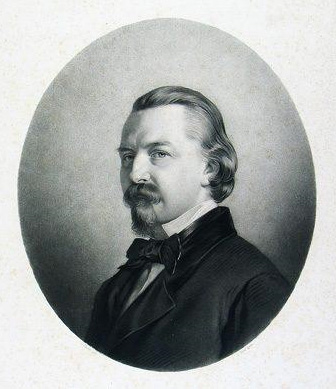
Portrait of the composer

Friedrich Wilhelm Kücken (16 November 1810 – 3 April 1882) was a German composer and conductor. He was a very prolific composer, mainly known for light and melodious songs, although he has also written works for the stage and for orchestra.

== Career ==
Kücken was born in Bleckede, near Lüneburg. The son of an executioner, he learned the piano as a child and played chamber music at home in a family ensemble. After moving to Schwerin he studied harmony with his brother-in-law Friedrich Lührss, and piano with Georg Rettberg, also learning flute and violin. From 1832 to 1841, Kücken lived in Berlin, studying counterpoint with Heinrich Birnbach and teaching music to the later king George V of Hanover; he was also a member of the Sing-Akademie. Leaving Berlin, he studied with Simon Sechter in Vienna (until 1843), when his popular song Ach, wie wärs möglich dann secured his being chosen court composer for Grand Duke Paul Friedrich von Mecklenburg-Schwerin.

In 1844, he went for further studies to Paris, learning instrumentation with Fromental Halévy and vocal composition with Marco Bordogni. While in Paris, he completed his opera Der Prätendent, which was premiered in Stuttgart in 1847, becoming one of his best-known works. After spending various periods in Berlin, Hamburg and Schwerin, he moved to Stuttgart in 1851, becoming second conductor at the court theatre besides Peter Josef von Lindpaintner, becoming first conductor on Lindpaintner's death in 1856, a position he held until 1861. He then retired to Schwerin where he died in 1882 aged 71.

== Music ==
Kücken's music has as yet not been studied in any detail. His numerous light and popular songs brought him fame all over Europe and were published and reprinted in many editions. But his works also included operas, orchestral and chamber music, and choral works. His most popular large-scale work was the opera Der Prätendent.

Nikolai Rimsky-Korsakov viewed Kücken's work dimly as "saccharine" and Franz Liszt expressed his judgment in a letter to Richard Wagner:

You wife, in that case, must not refuse me the boon of getting me excellent coffee and a practicable coffee machine, for the abominable beverage which is served at the hotel as coffee is as disgusting to me as a pièce de salon by Kücken, etc., and embitters my morning hours. (July 10th, 1857)

== Selected works ==
Operas

- Die Flucht nach der Schweiz, Op. 24 (libretto, Karl Blum), 1 act (Berlin, 1839)
- Der Prätendent (lib. Carl Philipp Berger), 3 acts (Stuttgart, 21 April 1847)
- Maienzauber (lib. Gustav von Putlitz) (Schwerin, 1864)

Orchestral music

- Gebet, Op. 62
- Waldleben, Op. 79
- Nussknacker-Quadrille, Op. 85 No. 2
- Orchesterstücke, Op. 92
- Fantasie, Op. 95
- Phantasie, Op. 108
- Trauermarsch, Op. 111
- Overture, Op. 116

Songs

- single songs with opus numbers 1, 9, 10, 14, 17, 19, 20, 23, 28, 34, 42, 47, 51, 52, 55, 57, 58, 61, 80, 91, 99, 103
- Zwei Balladen, Op. 3
- Duets with opus numbers 8, 15, 21, 26, 30, 54, 87, 105
- Gesänge, Op. 18 and Op. 39
- Lieder und Duette, Op. 35
- Tscherkasisches Lied, Op. 27
- Maurisches Ständchen, Op. 31
- Gesang der Brautjungfern, Op. 37
- Mein Herz, Op. 40
- Marienlieder, Op. 50
- Der Senn, Op. 59
- Der Himmel hat eine Träne geweint, Op. 63
- Ebbe und Flut, Op. 65
- Das Wasser ist tief, Op. 68
- Schlummerlied, Op. 82
- O dolce cento, Op. 89
- Gedenke der Heimat, Op. 98
- Die Nixen, Op. 100
- Gesangstudien, Op. 112
