= Grupo Especial de Operaciones =

Police tactical unit of Spain's National Police Corps

Special Group of Operations
- Grupo Especial de Operaciones
- Badge of the Grupo Especial de Operaciones
- Active: 5 April 1978 – present
- Country: Spain
- Agency: National Police Corps
- Type: Police tactical unit
- Role: Counter-terrorism; Law enforcement Special operations
- Motto: Listo o no, ya estamos aqui. Ready or not, we are already here.
- Abbreviation: GEO

Commanders
- Current commander: Esteban Lezaun

Notables
- Anniversaries: 1 April

Website
- https://www.lawebdelgeo.es

The Grupo Especial de Operaciones (GEO, Spanish pronunciation: [ˈxeo]; lit. 'Special Group of Operations'), is the police tactical unit of Spain's National Police Corps.

== History ==
With the intention of fighting against terrorism and several organized crime groups from Spain in the 1970s, in November 1977 the third section of Spanish military staff announced for members of the Policía Nacional vacancies which could be accessed freely for the newly formed Grupo Especial de Operaciones. The first training course began in March 1978.

A select group who had been months before in the GSG 9 base in San Agustín del Guadalix was selected to train this new unit. Colonel Ulrich Wegener, along with some members of his unit, took care of the equipment, the training and techniques which this new special unit in Spain would use.

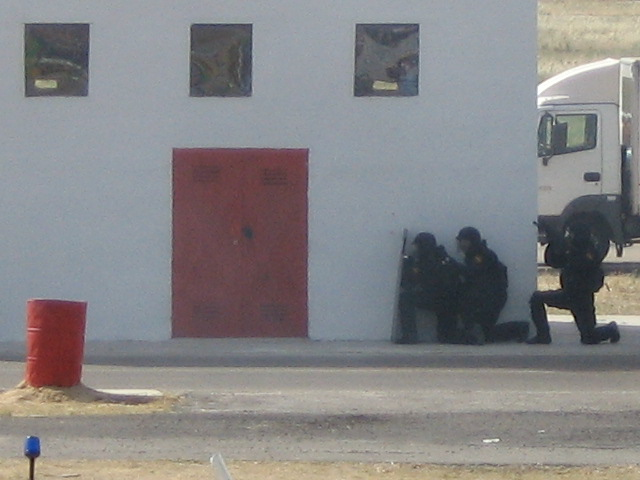
Members of the GEO assault a building during a training exercise

The first access course of the GEO ended on 19 January 1979, with a ceremony attended by Juan Carlos I and Queen Sofía of Spain. On 23 February of that year, the unit was announced to the press.

Its first planned operation took place at Madrid Barajas International Airport in August 1978 but they did not have to enter into action because the conflict was solved before their arrival. The GEO's first action took place in Bilbao, 7 February 1981, in which five hostages were freed from two armed criminals in a branch office of the bank then known as Banco Bilbao Vizcaya. None of the criminals, hostages or police officers were hurt during the mission.

GEO was responsible for rescuing Dr. Iglesias Puga, father of singer Julio Iglesias as well as foiling an attempt by ETA to attack the 1992 Summer Olympics in Barcelona. Aside from that, the GEO has disarmed several organized crime groups, arrested forty-one armed members of different terrorist groups, freed 424 persons who had been kidnapped or taken as hostages and boarded twenty ships used to carry narcotics to seize their load and arrest their crew.

During the 27 years, it has been active, five members of the GEO have died. The unit has had only one casualty in combat, which occurred during the assault on the Leganés flat where the suspected perpetrators of the Madrid train bombings of 11 March 2004 were hiding. Having realized that they were trapped, the terrorists detonated bombs in the flat killing themselves and GEO Subinspector Francisco Javier Torronteras Gadea. This fatality was probably caused by the fact that the agents who entered the flat didn't know that the terrorists could have explosives.

As of 2005, the GEO was having problems with the number of members, which was below the necessary quantity. This meant that riot control units had to be sent to guard the Spanish embassy in Baghdad instead of GEO members, as originally intended.

On 17 August 2017, an unconfirmed amount of GEO operators were sent to Barcelona after the ramming of multiple people in the Cataluna section of the city.

== Organization ==
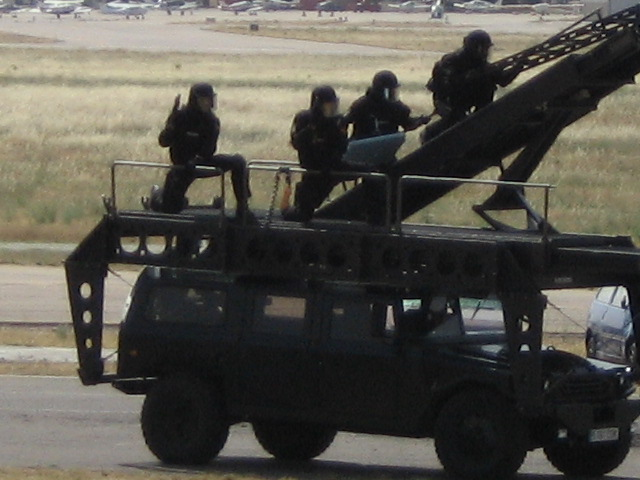
Members of the GEO during a police assault demonstration riding a VAMTAC vehicle

The GEO reports to the General Operative Subdirector of the Cuerpo Nacional de Policía and its commander is a police superintendent. Its 110 members are divided into an Operative Section and a Support one.

GEO's Operative Section is formed by two Operative Action teams, a group of Training and Specialities and a Techniques and Experiences team. The action teams are called 40 and 50 and are under the command of an inspector.

Each group, led by a Subinspector, is split into two subgroups formed by three operative commandos of five men each. Every operative commando includes two snipers, a lock picking specialist, an explosives expert, a combat diver and a special environment technician.

The Training and Specialities operative team features the instructors of the training and refresher courses. The Techniques and Experiences team tests new equipment and looks for new possible terrorist objectives.

Administrative, medical and transport personnel act as members of the Support Section. The vehicles of the GEO depend on this section.

== Capacities ==
The GEO has response capabilities and is responsible for VIP protection duties, as well as countering and responding to terrorism.

Organized along the lines of many other police tactical units throughout Europe, the GEOs is focused on dealing with terrorist attacks, including aircraft hijackings as well as maritime threats and hostage taking.

The GEO can also be used in a support role for Spanish Police operations outside the realm of terrorism, and is active in protecting visiting heads of state and providing security for high-profile events such as the 1992 Summer Olympics held in Barcelona.

The GEO is a member of the ATLAS Network, that includes all the national police tactical units of European Union countries and some countries outside the European Union.

== Access and training ==
Joining the GEO is accomplished by approximately 3% of the candidates every year.

To join the GEO it is necessary to have been a member of the Cuerpo Nacional de Policía for two years, and to have at least one of the following skills: expertise in a martial art, scuba diving, being a marksmanship instructor, is an explosives expert and having worked in one of the operative groups the Police has in some province capitals.

The trial features both physical fitness and psychological tests. Its physical fitness test includes arm flexions on a bar, vertical jump, an obstacle course, running three kilometers in eleven minutes and a half, fifty meters of freestyle swimming, a strength test, a speed race and the last challenge which tests the candidates' decision-making capacity.

On the psychological and intelligence test the mental capabilities of the candidates are checked.

=== Specialization ===
After having passed the access trial, GEO potential members go through a specialization course in Guadalajara which is not passed by all candidates.

There are four areas that candidates must master: instrumental, juridical, socio-professional, and police sciences and techniques.

Police science and technique features high-speed and off-road driving, lock picking techniques, abseiling and climbing techniques, maneuvers with helicopters, transmissions, explosives and knowledge about terrorist groups.

Instrumental area deals with physical aptitudes such as marksmanship, obstacle courses, martial arts, physical fitness, swimming, sniping, diving, and proficiency with motorcycles.

The remaining areas are focused on the rights of terrorist groups and exchanging experience with members of similar groups of other countries.

== Equipment ==
The uniform of the GEO includes: anorak, jacket, sweater, t-shirt, pants, boots and beret. Overalls are used as a complementary clothing piece. During summer, GEO members use a short-sleeved shirt instead of the sweater and the jacket.

Uniforms of GEO
Training (old)	Training	1978–1990	1990–present

Aside from their uniform, GEO members use protective gear which features helmets, Bolle Commando protective goggles, balaclava, Draeger gas mask, ballistic vest, Safariland sheaths for SIG P226 and gloves.

They also use vision-enhancing devices such as MATIS thermographic cameras, daylight thermographic cameras, binoculars, PalMIr 250 night vision cameras, Philips BM8028A1 binocular night vision goggles, ITT AN/AVS-9 binocular night vision goggles, ITT Pocket F6010 night vision visor and laser rangefinders.

To communicate between them they use the Matra SIRDEE (Sistema Integral de Radiodifusión Encriptada del Estado), Motorola MXR-1000 and MXR-2000 models and VHF/UHF portable repeaters.

For operations underwater they use other special gear. It includes: neoprene suits, dry suits for dives in contaminated water, "twin-hose" and "single-hose" open-circuit scubas, dive computers, underwater robots for dives up to 200 meters and dive support equipment.

The vehicles used include cars and bikes, special boats, Police helicopters and CH-47 Chinook heavy helicopters of the Spanish Army.

=== Weapons ===
Model	Type	Origin	References
Manurhin MR-73	Revolver	France	
Heckler & Koch P9S	Semi-automatic pistol	Germany	
SIG Sauer P226	Semi-automatic pistol	Germany	
Heckler & Koch USP Compact	Semi-automatic pistol	Germany	
SIG Sauer P320	Semi-automatic pistol	United States	
Heckler & Koch MP5	Submachine gun	Germany	
Heckler & Koch MP7	Submachine gun	Germany	
CZ Scorpion Evo 3 A1	Submachine gun	Czech Republic	
FN P90	Submachine gun	Belgium	
FN F2000	Assault rifle	Belgium	
SIG SG 551 SWAT	Assault rifle	Switzerland	
SIG SG 552	Assault rifle	Switzerland	
Heckler & Koch G41TGS	Assault rifle	Germany	
Heckler & Koch HK33	Assault rifle	Germany	
Heckler & Koch HK417	Sniper rifle	Germany	
Mauser SP66	Sniper rifle	Germany	
Heckler & Koch PSG1	Sniper rifle	Germany	
AMP DSR-1	Sniper rifle	Germany	
Heckler & Koch G3SG/1	Sniper rifle	Germany	
Sako TRG	Sniper rifle	Finland	
Remington 870	Shotgun	United States	
Heckler & Koch HK512	Shotgun	Germany	
Franchi SPS 350	Shotgun	Italy	
Franchi SPS 230	Shotgun	Italy	

GEO members also employ electroshock weapons, which caused some controversy when Amnesty International denounced the use of such weapons by the Policía Nacional.

To increase shooting accuracy they employ shooting support devices such as the holographic weapon sight, AMT reflex sights, Schmidt & Bender 1.5 – 6 x 42 daylight sights, Simrad KN250F night vision sights, Zeiss Diavari daylight sights, Varo AN/PVS-4 night vision sights, EDS laser sights and Sure-Fire flashlights.

== Bibliography ==
- Ryan, Mike; Mann, Chris; Stilwell, Alexander (2004). Fuerzas Especiales del Mundo (in Spanish). Alcobendas, Madrid: Editorial LIBSA. ISBN 84-662-0891-7.
