= Heckler & Koch HK512 =

HK 512
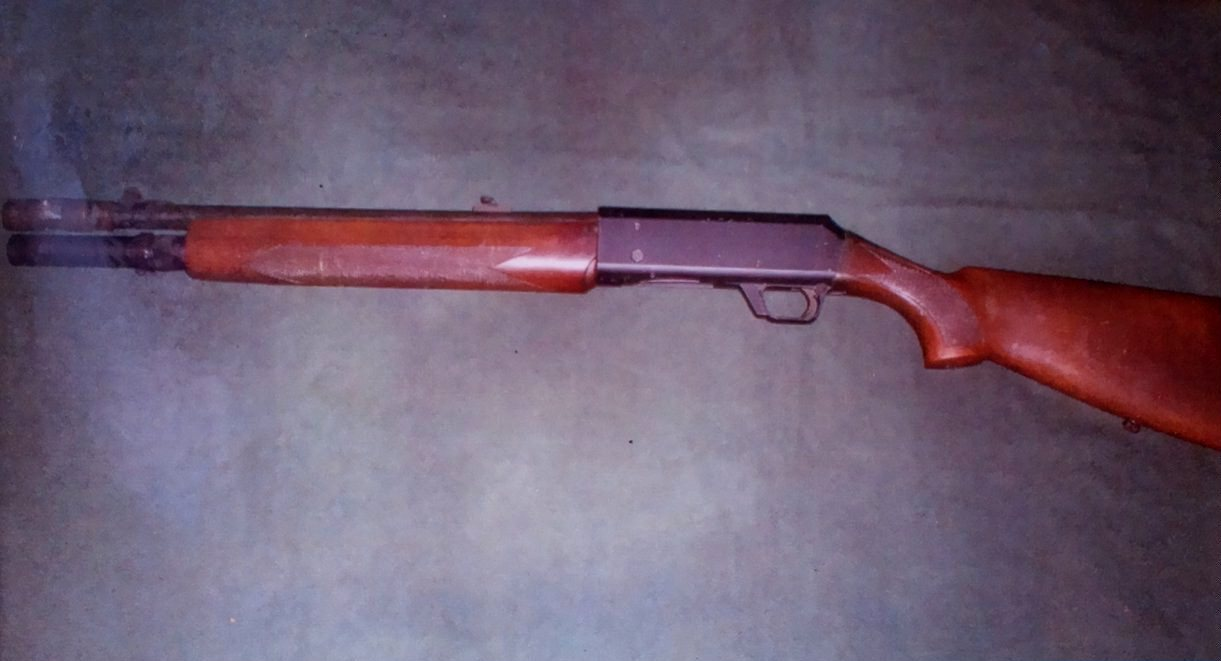
- HK512 as used by the Royal Malaysian Police.
- Type: Shotgun
- Place of origin: Germany; Italy

Service history
- Used by: See Users

Production history
- Designer: Luigi Franchi
- Designed: 1970s
- Manufacturer: Heckler & Koch (Final Assembly); Franchi S.p.A. (Initial Assembly)
- Produced: 1980s–present
- No. built: Around 1,500 made
- Variants: See Variants

Specifications
- Mass: 8 lb (3.6 kg) (28" barrel)
- Length: Varies with model
- Barrel length: 18 in (460 mm) to 30 in (760 mm)
- Cartridge: 12 gauge
- Action: Semi-automatic, gas-operated
- Feed system: 7 round tubular magazine

The Heckler & Koch HK 512 is a semi-automatic shotgun of Italian origin. It was developed and produced by Franchi at the request of Heckler & Koch, which took care of marketing and sales.

The HK 512 was one of the first semi-automatic shotguns developed for law enforcement use.

== History ==
The HK 512 was known to be sold in limited quantities in the United States due to an overrun from a law enforcement contract to Kiesler (Note: Other sources spell the name as Kessler.) Police Supply, which sold 263 shotguns.

== Design ==
The HK 512 is a semi-automatic shotgun that uses a Franchi gas recoil system as the shotgun was manufactured by Franchi for H&K due to their business relationship at the time. This is not to be confused with the inertia recoil mechanism manufactured by Benelli that H&K later imported into the USA. The stock and forearm are made of wood and the rest of the gun is made out of metal. The smoothbore barrel is fitted with a choke that acts as a shot diverter to vertically string pellets, making it more effective against human targets and minimizing collateral damage as this was specified by GSG9.

The HK512 is designed for use by police and military forces; indeed, the use of standard sporting cartridges, shells with reduced charges, or plastic training rounds will cause the HK-512 to malfunction. The safety is made in the form of a cross-bolt button, located behind the trigger.

The muzzle of the gun incorporates a shot diverter, which acts as a muzzle device that allows the shotgun to fire oval-based shot patterns instead of round-based shot patterns. Because of this shot diverter, the HK-512 also cannot fire tear gas or signal cartridges. The diverter can be adjusted for either horizontal or vertical dispersion.

The HK 512 can fire 12 gauge 2.75-inch shotgun shells. The tubular magazine holds seven rounds. Only buckshot rounds can be fired due to the muzzle device. The use of low powered rounds causes the HK 512 to malfunction.

== Users ==
- Austria: EKO Cobra
- Germany: GSG-9
- Portugal: The HK502 used by the GOE.
- Spain: Grupo Especial de Operaciones

== Variants ==
The following variants are made for the HK512:

- HK 502: Original production model, produced in small quantities.
- HK 512: Improved production model with various minor improvements.

== Production ==
Around 1,500 HK512s were made before production ended.

== Bibliography ==
- Ryan, Mike; Mann, Chris; Stilwell, Alexander (2014). The Encyclopedia of the World's Special Forces: Tactics, History, Strategy. Amber Books Ltd.
- Tophoven, Rolf (1984). GSG 9: German response to terrorism. Bernard & Graefe Verlag. ISBN 978-3763750887.
