= Unidad Especial de Intervención =

Spanish Civil Guard Unit

Special Intervention Unit Unidad Especial de Intervención
- Coat of arms

- Patch

- Service Badge
- Abbreviation: UEI
- Motto: Celeritas et Subtilitas Patrio; Speed and Precision for the Fatherland

Agency overview
- Formed: 1978

Jurisdictional structure
- Operations jurisdiction: Spain
- General nature: Gendarmerie
- Specialist jurisdiction: Counter terrorism, special weapons operations; protection of internationally protected persons, other very important persons, or state property

Notables
- Person: Our Lady of the Pillar, Patron
- Anniversary: June 3rd

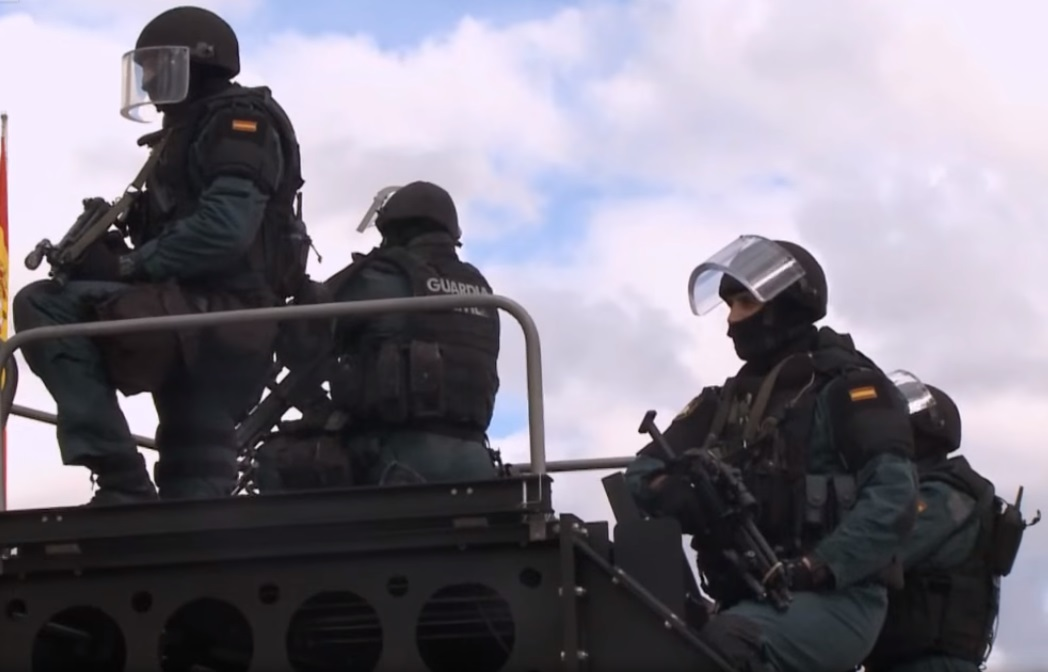
Some UEI members pictured at the Valdemoro garrison

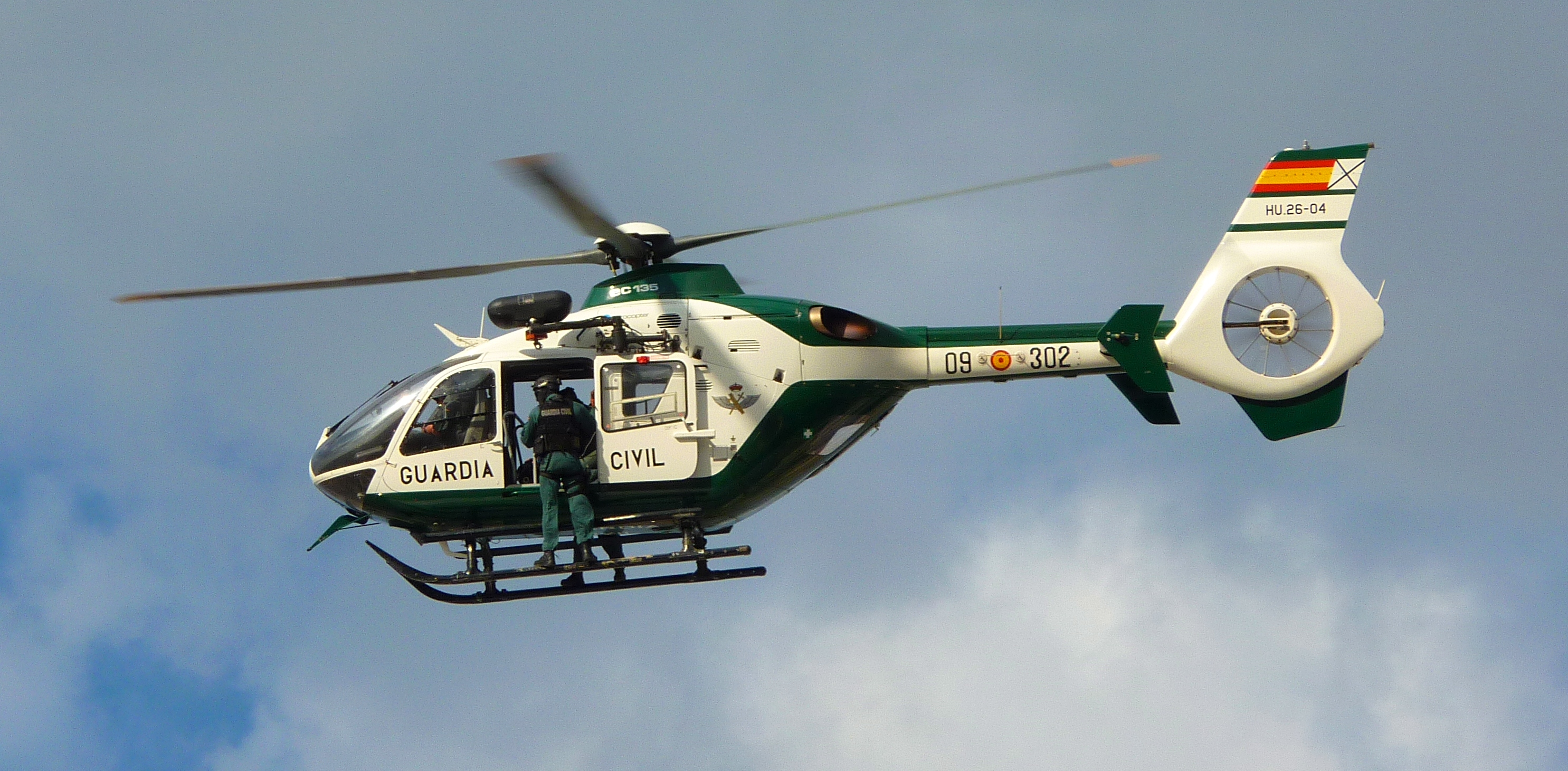
Spanish Civil Guard Eurocopter EC-135P-2 carrying members of the UEI (Special Intervention Unit)

The Unidad Especial de Intervención (UEI) (English: Special Intervention Unit) is a police tactical unit of the Spanish Civil Guard that specialized in counterterrorism and hostage rescue crisis management, high-risk tactical special operations, quick raid to capture or kill (if necessary) high-value targets, and VIP protection.

The unit's missions primarily involve anti-irregular military, apprehension of armed and dangerous criminals, counterterrorism and hostage rescue, executive protection, high-risk tactical law enforcement situations, operating in difficult to access terrain, protecting high-level meeting areas, providing security in areas at risk of attack or terrorism, special reconnaissance in difficult to access and dangerous areas, support crowd control and riot control, and tactical special operations.

== Overview ==
UEI was established in 1978 to respond to high risk situations and including those involving hostages and terrorism situations. Its motto is Celeritas et Subtilitas Patrio. The exact scope of UEI operations and total number of personnel are not published. In 2008, on the occasion of the Unit's 30th anniversary, its commanding officer revealed that the UEI had until then participated in 375 operations, in which 563 hostages had been freed and 640 people arrested, of whom 141 belonged to terrorist groups. These operations included 11 high-sea missions against drug-trafficking. He also revealed that due to the demanding selection process, of the 26 applicants that had applied to join the Unit that year, only four had been admitted. The Unit has also intervened in 18 prison riots involving hostages. The UEI is part of the European Union-sponsored ATLAS Network.

== Equipment ==
=== Uniform ===
In assaults operations:

- Green assault coveralls with the unit's shield on the right sleeve at shoulder height and the Spanish flag on the left sleeve at shoulder height.
- Black balaclava that gives the informal nickname to the unit: black faces.
- Bulletproof vest.
- Tactical vest, dress on the previous one.
- Helmet with ballistic protection visor for urban combat.
- Protection of elbows, knees and shin guards.
- Boots and gloves.

In boarding operations:

- Black coveralls of naval intervention with autoinflatable life jacket. Shield and flag on the sleeves.
- Black balaclava.
- Bulletproof vest.
- Tactical vest.
- Protection of elbows, knees and shin guards.
- ProTec lightweight half-head polyethylene hull.
- Boots and gloves.

In riot control operations:

- Equipment for riot control.

=== Weapons ===
These are a few of them:

Model	Type	Origin
Heckler & Koch USP Compact	Semi-automatic pistol	Germany
Glock 17	Semi-automatic pistol	Austria
Glock 19	Semi-automatic pistol	Austria
Heckler & Koch MP5	Submachine gun	Germany
Heckler & Koch MP7	Submachine gun	Germany
FN P90	Submachine gun	Belgium
Heckler & Koch G36	Assault rifle	Germany
Heckler & Koch G41	Assault rifle	Germany
Heckler & Koch HK416	Assault rifle	Germany
Heckler & Koch HK417	Sniper rifle	Germany
Barrett M82	Sniper rifle	United States
Accuracy International Arctic Warfare	Sniper rifle	United Kingdom

== Organization ==
The Unit is commanded by an active lieutenant colonel of the Civil Guard and its divided on:

- Operative Groups
- Technical Support Groups.

== See also ==
- Grupo de Operaciones Especiales (Spain)
