= ATLAS Network =

Law enforcement units in the EU

ATLAS
- Formation: 2001
- Legal status: Transnational Organization
- Purpose: Police tactical unit co-operation
- Headquarters: Brussels, Belgium
- Region served: Europe
- Main organ: Various Committees
- Parent organization: European Union

The ATLAS network is an association of law enforcement special intervention units from the 27 Member States of the European Union and associated countries. It was established following the terrorist attacks of 11 September 2001, on the initiative of the European Police Chiefs Task Force (EPCTF).

== History ==
ATLAS was initially informally established for information exchange and training activities co-operation between units. It was later formalised by a decision of the Council of the European Union in 2008, which also expanded ATLAS's functions to include the provision of assistance upon request to another Member State.

In 2018, an ATLAS Support Office was established within Europol's European Counter Terrorism Centre (ECTC) in The Hague, Netherlands, thereby strengthening the role of the ATLAS Network within European law enforcement organisations.

== Terms ==
ATLAS uses the terms 'special intervention unit' and 'crisis situation' defined as follows:

- 'Special intervention unit' refers to any law enforcement unit of a Member State that is specialised in controlling a crisis situation.
- 'Crisis situation' refers to any situation in which the competent authorities of a Member State have reasonable grounds to believe that there is a criminal offence presenting a serious direct physical threat to persons, property, infrastructure, or institutions in that Member State, particularly in situations combating terrorism.

== Organization ==
ATLAS recognises that a Member State may not have the means, resources, or expertise to handle all crisis situations, particularly large crises. It provides a framework for a Member State to request assistance from another Member State.

== Members ==
ATLAS consists of 38 special intervention units, including units from non-EU Member States such as Switzerland, Norway, Iceland, and the United Kingdom. The non-EU Member States can participate and use of all facilities, but they do not have voting rights.

Country	Unit	Part of	Notes
Austria	EKO Cobra; Einsatzkommando Cobra; Task Force Cobra	Federal Ministry of the Interior	
Belgium	DSU; Directie van de Speciale Eenheden; Directorate of Special Units	Federal Police	
Bulgaria	SOBT; Специализиран отряд за борба с тероризма Special Counter Terrorism Unit	Ministry of Interior	
Croatia	ATU Lucko; Antiteroristička jedinica Lučko; Specijalna Policija MUP RH	Croatian Police	
Cyprus	EAO; Mechanokiniti Monada Amesis Drasis; Special Antiterrorist Squad	Cyprus Police	
Czech Republic	URNA; Útvar rychlého nasazení Rapid Response Unit	Police of the Czech Republic	
Denmark	AKS; Politiets Aktionsstyrke; Special Intervention Unit	Danish National Police	
Estonia	K-Komando; Counter Terrorism Unit	Police and Border Guard Board	
Finland	Karhu; Helsingin poliisilaitos Valmiusyksikkö; Police Special Intervention Unit	Helsinki Police Department	
France	GIGN; Groupe d'intervention de la Gendarmerie nationale National Gendarmerie Intervention Group	National Gendarmerie	
France	RAID; Recherche, Assistance, Intervention, Dissuasion; Research, Assistance, Intervention, Deterrence	National Police	
Germany	GSG 9 GSG 9 der Bundespolizei; GSG 9 of the Federal Police	Federal Police	Formerly known as Grenzschutzgruppe 9 (GSG 9; Border Protection Group 9) of the Bundesgrenzschutz)
Germany	SEK; Spezialeinsatzkommando der Polizei Baden-Württemberg, SEK BW; Special Task Force	State Police	
Greece	EKAM; Eidiki Katastaltiki Antitromokratiki Monada; Special Suppressive Antiterrorist Unit	Hellenic Police	
Hungary	TEK; Terrorelhárítási Központ; Counter Terrorism Centre	Ministry of Interior	
Iceland	Viking; Sérsveit ríkislögreglustjóra Special Unit of the National Police Commissioner	Icelandic Police	Non-EU participant
Ireland	ERU; Aonad Práinnfhreagartha; Emergency Response Unit	Garda Síochána	
Italy	GIS; Gruppo di Intervento Speciale; Special Intervention Group	Carabinieri	
Italy	NOCS; Nucleo Operativo Centrale di Sicurezza; Central Security Task Group	National Police	
Latvia	OMEGA; Pretterorisma vienība Omega; Counterterrorism Unit	State Police	
Lithuania	ARAS; Antiteroristinių Operacijų Rinktinė ARAS; Anti-terrorist Operations Unit	Lithuanian Police Force	
Luxembourg	USP; Unité Spéciale de la Police; Police Special Unit	Grand Ducal Police	
Malta	SIU; Special Intervention Unit	Malta Police Force	
Netherlands	DSI; Dienst Speciale Interventies; Special Intervention Service	National Police Corps	
Norway	Delta; Politiet Beredskapstroppen; Emergency Unit	Norwegian Police Service	Non-EU participant
Poland	BOA; Centralny Pododdział Kontrterrorystyczny Policji; Central Counter-terrorism Police Subunit	Polish Police	
Portugal	GIOE; Grupo de Intervenção de Operações Especiais; Special Operations Intervention Group	National Republican Guard	
Portugal	GOE; Grupo de Operações Especiais; Special Operations Group	Public Security Police	
Romania	BSIJ; Brigada Specială de Intervenție a Jandarmeriei; Gendarmerie Special Intervention Brigade	Romanian Gendarmerie	
Romania	SIAS; Serviciul de Intervenții și Acțiuni Speciale; Special Actions and Intervention Service	Romanian Police	
Slovakia	Lynx Commando; Útvar osobitného určenia Special Counter Terrorism Police Unit	Ministry of the Interior	
Slovenia	Red Panther; Specialna Enota Policije; Special Police Unit	Slovenian National Police Force	
Spain	UEI; Unidad Especial de Intervención; Special Intervention Unit	Civil Guard	
Spain	GEO; Grupo Especial de Operaciones; Special Operations Group	National Police Corps	
Sweden	NI; Nationella insatsstyrkan National Task Force	Swedish Police Authority	
Switzerland	SWISS SIU; Swiss Special Intervention Units	Cantonal police	Non-EU participant
United Kingdom	SCO19; Specialist Firearms Command 19	Metropolitan Police	Non-EU participant
United Kingdom	HMSU; Headquarters Mobile Support Unit	Police Service of Northern Ireland	Non-EU participant

== See also ==
- List of police tactical units
- Europol
- Club de Berne, the equivalent for intelligence services
