= ARAS (Lithuania) =

Lithuanian Police Anti-terrorist Operations Unit

Lithuanian Police Anti-terrorist Operations Unit ARAS
- Lietuvos policijos antiteroristinių operacijų rinktinė ARAS
- Active: 1991 – present
- Country: Lithuania
- Agency: Lithuanian Police Force
- Type: Police tactical unit
- Operations jurisdiction: National

Website
- Official website

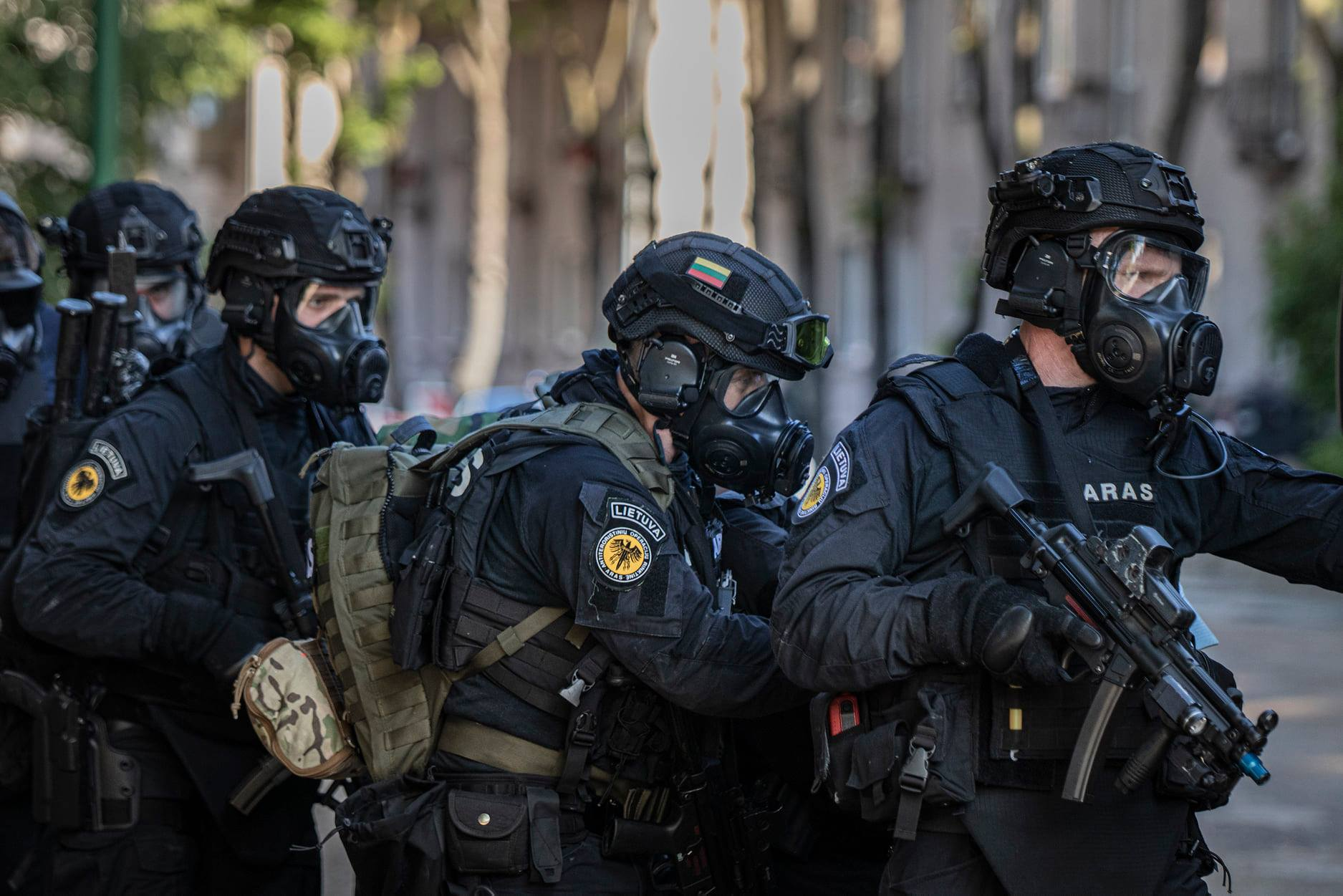
ARAS anti-terrorist unit during the exercises with the Armed Forces

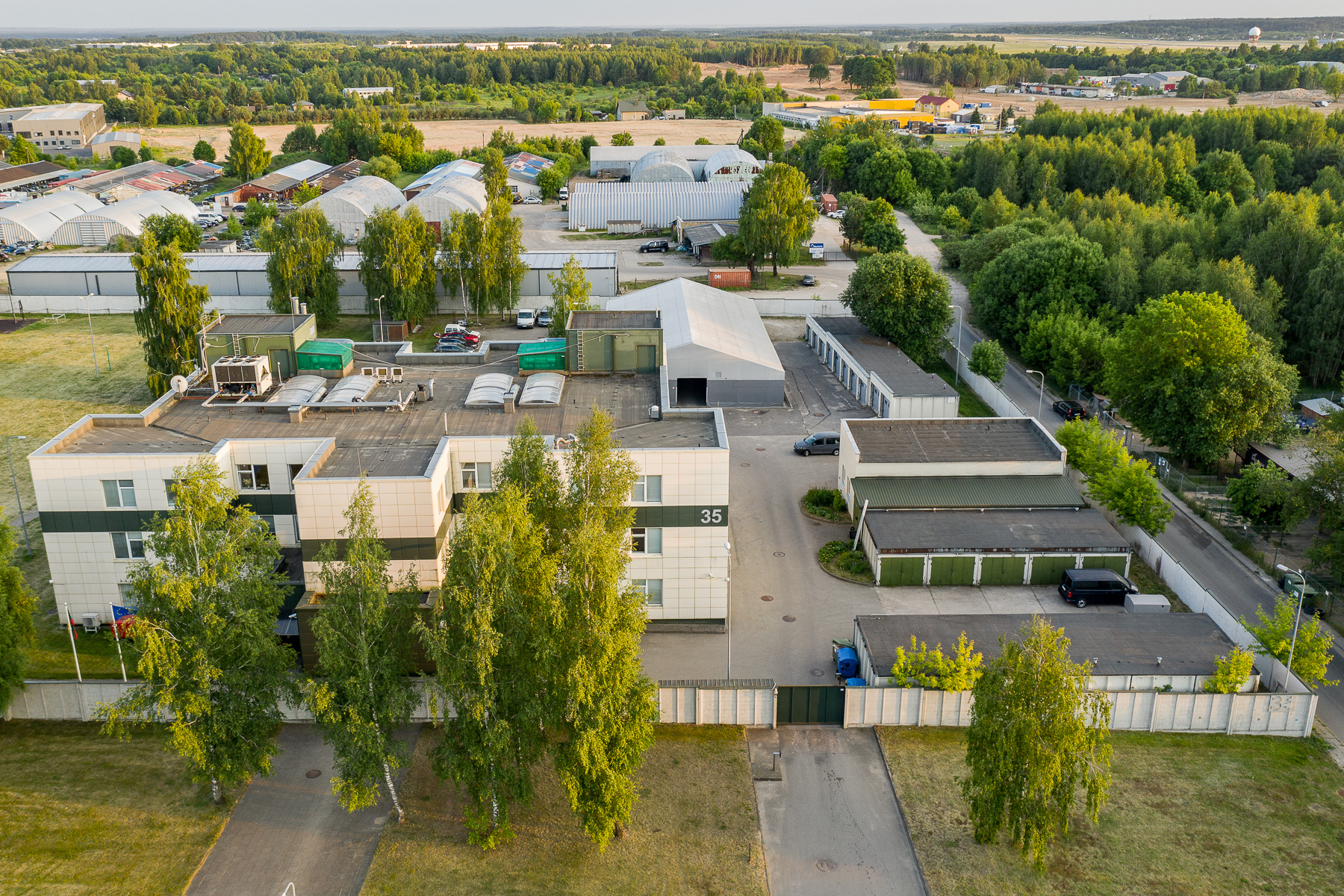
Headquarters

The ARAS, formally Lithuanian Police Anti-terrorist Operations Unit ARAS (Lithuanian: Lietuvos policijos antiteroristinių operacijų rinktinė ARAS), is the police tactical unit of the Lithuanian Police Force, established in 1991.

== History ==
ARAS's initial purpose was to suppress organized crime groups that were operating in Lithuania in 1990s. In addition, they handled riot suppression, peace keeping, and escort.

In December 2004, the unit was admitted into the ATLAS Network of police tactical units of the European Union countries.

Aras does several hundred domestic and international operations in a typical year, most of which are never publicized.

== Structure ==
ARAS consists of a:

- Command,
- Special Team,
- Explosive Search and Neutralization Division,
- Information, analysis and negotiation Division,
- 2 divisions, one of them located in Klaipėda.

The unit also has specialized CBRN defense, climber, combat medic, EOD, K-9, negotiation, reconnaissance, sniper, and tactical diver groups that are necessary to carry out the main functions ascribed to the unit.

== Functions ==
The main functions of ARAS are to:

- organize, manage and implement special antiterrorist operations inside Lithuania;
- hostage rescue and detain dangerous armed criminals under extreme or high danger circumstances;
- search for and neutralize improvised explosive devices and military explosives, used for terrorist or criminal purposes;
- under their competence participate while performing various operative actions, detaining persons, suspected to have performed or planning to commit a crime;
- collect and analyze information related to terrorist threats, cooperate with professional institutions of other countries in this sphere;
- participate in organizing and implementing plans and programs for antiterrorist measures, and other legal acts establishing terrorism prevention.

== Equipment ==
ARAS operators use a variety of modern weapons, including:

Model	Type	Origin
SIG Sauer P226	Semi-automatic pistol	Germany
Heckler & Koch MP5	Submachine gun	Germany
Heckler & Koch G36	Assault rifle	Germany
SIG SG 551	Assault rifle	Switzerland
SIG MCX	Assault rifle	United States
PGM Ultima Ratio	Sniper rifle	France
PGM Hécate II	Sniper rifle	France
AWM-F	Sniper rifle	United Kingdom

Aras equipment also includes armored vehicles, boats, helicopters and various aerial, land and naval drones.
