= Espírito Santo Bank of Campolide robbery =

2008 bank robbery in Lisbon, Portugal

- Location: Campolide, Lisbon, Portugal
- Date: 7 August 2008
- Attack type: Bank robbery, hostage-taking
- Weapon: Firearms
- Deaths: 1 (Nilson Souza)
- Injuries: 1 (Wellington Nazaré)
- Victims: 6 hostages (including the bank manager)
- Perpetrators: Wellington Nazaré and Nilson Souza

On August 7, 2008, the Campolide branch of the Banco Espírito Santo in Lisbon was held up in a robbery attempt.

Two armed assailants of Brazilian nationality, Wellington Nazaré and Nilson Souza, took over the bank at 3 p.m., kidnapping six people. The two men and four women who were taken hostage included the manager, the deputy manager, and four customers. Rapid intervention forces from the Portuguese police quickly removed all parked vehicles in the area, closed nearby establishments, and interrupted traffic. Several emergency medical assistance vehicles and health personnel equipped with bulletproof vests were also mobilized.

After several hours of unsuccessful negotiation attempts, the Portuguese Special Operations Group was forced to intervene. A team of special shooters shot the two kidnappers with precision shots from a distance. Souza died immediately, while Nazaré suffered very serious injuries, but survived. The hostages were unharmed.

The event was one of the most widely reported criminal cases in the history of Portugal, arising amidst a wave of violent crime against banks, gas stations and jewelry stores in the Greater Lisbon region in 2008.

== See also ==
- List of hostage crises
- List of bank robberies
