= Heckler & Koch G41 =

Assault rifle produced by Heckler & Koch

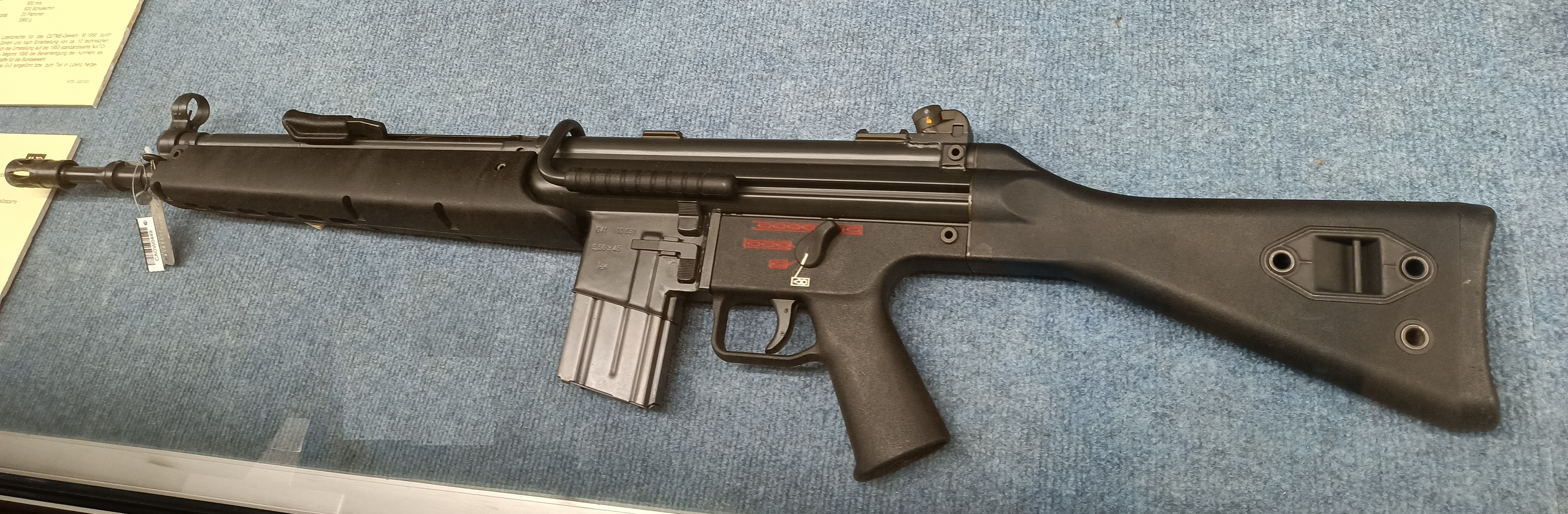
- HK G41 in the Wehrtechnische Studiensammlung Koblenz.
- Type: Assault rifle Carbine (H&K G41K)
- Place of origin: West Germany

Service history
- Used by: See Users
- Wars: Lebanese Civil War; Turkish-Kurdish conflict 2007 Lebanon conflict

Production history
- Designer: Heckler & Koch
- Designed: late 1970s to early 1980s
- Manufacturer: Heckler & Koch
- Produced: 1984–1996
- Variants: See Variants

Specifications
- Mass: G41/A1: 4.1 kg (9.04 lb); G41A2/A3: 4.4 kg (9.7 lb); G41K: 4.3 kg (9.5 lb)
- Length: G41/A1: 997 mm (39.3 in); G41A2/A3: 985 mm (38.8 in) stock extended / 800 mm (31.5 in) stock folded G41K: 930 mm (36.6 in) stock extended / 740 mm (29.1 in) stock retracted
- Barrel length: G41: 450 mm (17.7 in); G41K: 380 mm (15.0 in)
- Width: 72 mm (2.8 in)
- Height: 214 mm (8.4 in)
- Cartridge: 5.56×45mm NATO
- Caliber: 5.56mm
- Action: Roller delayed blowback
- Rate of fire: 850 rounds/min
- Muzzle velocity: G41 using SS109: 920 m/s (3,018 ft/s); G41K using SS109: 880 m/s (2,887.1 ft/s); G41 using M193: 950 m/s (3,116.8 ft/s); G41K using M193: 910 m/s (2,985.6 ft/s)
- Effective firing range: 200–400 m (219–437 yd) sight adjustments 600 metres (656 yd) with Fero Z24-G telescopic sight
- Feed system: Various STANAG magazines
- Sights: Rotary rear diopter drum, hooded front post

The Heckler & Koch G41 is a German 5.56×45mm NATO assault rifle introduced in 1981 and produced in limited quantities by Heckler & Koch. It was designed to replace the 7.62×51mm NATO chambered Heckler & Koch G3 and the G3 based .223 Remington/5.56×45mm and later 5.56×45mm NATO chambered Heckler & Koch HK33 service rifles providing a more modern weapon compatible with then recently introduced NATO standards. It can use both the then new STANAG 4172 compliant 5.56×45mm NATO SS109, SS110, and SS111 ammunition and older .223 Remington/5.56×45mm M193 ammunition and was the last Heckler & Koch service rifle designed around the roller-delayed blowback mechanism.

Commercially the G41 was not as successful as the preceding Heckler & Koch service rifle designs with a similar operating mechanism. It was rejected by various military trial programmes and it never won a major military production contract. Assembly of the G41 has been discontinued by Heckler & Koch; however, production rights to the rifle were acquired by the Italian arms manufacturer Luigi Franchi.

== Design ==
=== Operating mechanism ===
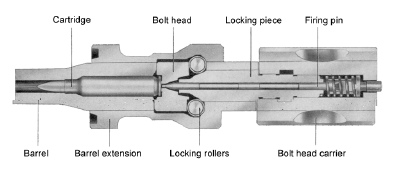
A schematic of the Heckler & Koch roller-delayed blowback mechanism

The G41's engineering origins lay in the 7.92×33mm Kurz StG 45(M) assault rifle, and later the commercially successful 7.62×51mm NATO G3 battle rifle and its 5.56×45mm NATO HK33 derivative. It is a selective fire automatic weapon that employs a roller-delayed blowback system of operation relying on geometrical transmission ratio relationships between parts. The two-piece bolt mechanism consists of a bolt head that contains two cylindrical locking rollers and a wedge-shaped locking piece, attached to a heavy bolt head carrier. Based on the geometric relationship arising from the angles of the roller contact surfaces of the wedge-shaped locking piece locking piece and the barrel extension recesses, the rearward motion of the bolt head is delayed by a predetermined ratio. Thus during the same period of time, the bolt head carrier moves significantly faster than the bolt head by the predetermined ratio. This ratio is continued until the locking rollers have been withdrawn from the barrel extension recesses. After the rollers retract entirely behind the bolt head, the locking recesses of the barrel extension are cleared, and all parts continue moving rearward together, opening the breech and actuating the extraction and feeding cycles. The chamber is opened under high pressure, thus the chamber received a series of flutes in order to increase extraction reliability and prevent sticking of the spent casing to the chamber walls.

Like the G3 and HK33 bolts the G41 bolt features an anti-bounce mechanism that prevents the bolt from bouncing off the barrel's breech surface. The "bolt head locking lever" is a spring-loaded claw mounted on the bolt carrier that grabs the bolt head as the bolt carrier group goes into battery. The lever essentially ratchets into place with friction, providing enough resistance to being re-opened that the bolt carrier does not rebound. The spring-powered claw extractor is also contained inside the bolt while the lever ejector is located inside the trigger housing (actuated by the recoiling bolt).

=== Features ===
The G41 receiver is stamped from a smooth 1.0 mm (0.04 in) sheet of high-tensile steel rather than the 1.2 mm (0.05 in) thick sheet steel used by the HK33.

The G41 also had a redesigned bolt assembly. It was designed around 5.56×45mm NATO ammunition with revised geometries between the bolt mechanism components to work with NATO STANAG magazines (from the M16 rifle). The magazine release is located on the left side of the rifle, above the magazine well.

The reliable functioning of roller-delayed blowback mechanisms is limited by specific ammunition and arm parameters like bullet weight, propellant charge, barrel length and amount of wear. For obtaining a proper and safe functioning parameters bandwidth Heckler & Koch offer a variety of locking pieces with different mass and shoulder angles. The angles are critical and determine the unlock timing and pressure curve progression as the locking pieces act in unison with the bolt head carrier.

The G41 bolt assembly is lighter than the HK33 bolt assembly. The redesigned bolt was paired with a new recoil spring which consisted of five wound strands around a central coil. This reduced recoil.

The revised buttstock on the G41 is held in place by two pins. Unlike the earlier HK33, the G41's pistol grip assembly is not retained by a pin at the front of the assembly behind the magazine well housing and can be removed by the user during a field strip.

The spent cartridge casing extractor is installed inside the bolt head, while the tilting lever ejector is contained in the trigger housing. The rifle is hammer-fired and has a trigger group with a fire control selector that enables selecting safe, semi-automatic, burst and continuous fire modes. The fire selector's positions are marked with bullet pictograms and it also serves as a manual safety against unintentional discharge. The selector is ambidextrous and its lever is mirrored on both sides of the trigger housing. In the "safe" position, the trigger and sear are disabled.

The weapon incorporates a manual forward assist that can be used to positively close the bolt, similar to the one used on the American M16A1 rifle, and a side-folding heavy-gauge wire carrying handle near its point of balance which resembles that of the FN FAL. It also has a "hold-open" bolt catch which holds the bolt open after the last round in the magazine has been fired (the bolt release button is just above the magazine release) and has a spring-loaded polymer dust cover that seals the ejection port from debris.

Despite reducing the weight of some components, the weight of the G41 exceeded the 3.65 kg (8.05 lb) weight of the preceding 60 mm (2.4 in) shorter barreled HK33A2, making the G41 relatively heavy compared to other 5.56×45mm NATO chambered assault rifles of its era.

=== Barrel ===
The cold hammer-forged barrel has a hexagonal polygonal bore. It comes rifled for either the NATO-standard, Belgian SS109 62 grain bullet with a twist of 178 mm (1:7 in) or in a 305 mm (1:12 in) twist for use with American .223 Remington/5.56×45mm ammunition with the M193 55 grain projectile. The barrel end of the chamber is fluted to assist in the extraction of spent cartridges. The barrel is equipped with a flash suppressor that is also designed to launch rifle grenades.

=== Sights ===
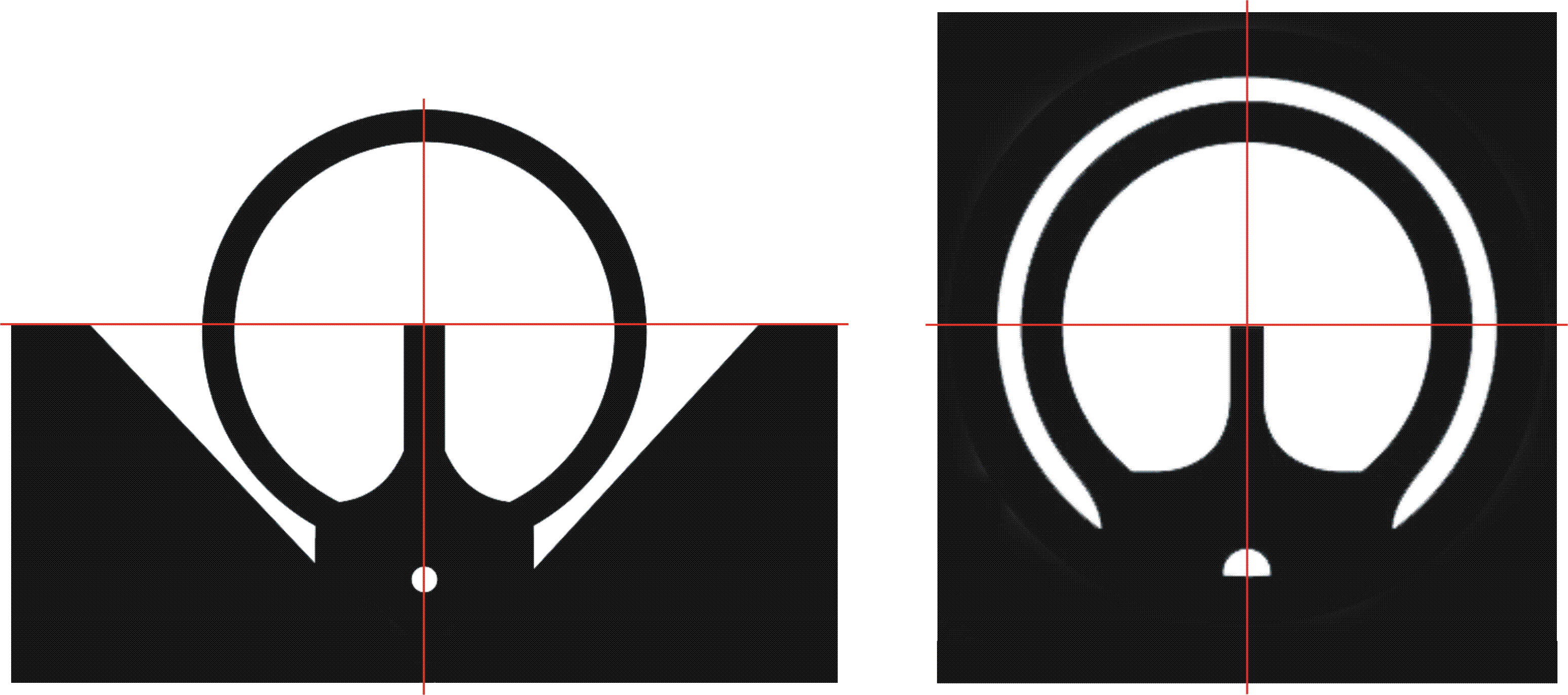
Drehvisier rotating drum sight pictures

The firearm is equipped with a relatively low iron sight line that consists of a Drehvisier rotary rear drum and hooded front post. The rear sight is mechanically adjustable for both windage and elevation with the help of tools. This deliberately prevents non-armorers from (re)zeroing the iron sight line. The rotary drum features an open V-notch (numbered 1) for rapid target acquisition, close range, low light and impaired visibility use and three apertures (numbered 2, 3 and 4) used for: 200–400 metres (219–437 yd) in 100 metres (109 yd) increments for more precise aiming. The 1 V-notch and 2 or 200 metres (219 yd) aperture settings have an identical point of aim. The V-notch and apertures are calibrated for 5.56×45mm NATO ball ammunition.

The receiver housing has a NATO pattern optics mount (meeting STANAG 2324) that replaced HK’s claw-mount system used to mount day (typically the Hensoldt 4×24 telescopic sight) or night aiming optics. The Hensoldt Fero 4×24 telescopic sight and mount assembly were developed for designated marksman use. The Fero elevation knob features Bullet Drop Compensation (BDC) settings for 100–600 metres (109–656 yd) in 100 metres (109 yd) increments calibrated for 5.56×45mm NATO ball ammunition.

=== Accessories ===
Many accessories are based on NATO standard or previously issued items.

The rifle can be fitted with a barrel-mounted bipod based on the one issued with the M16A1's cleaning kit. It also uses the bayonet from the G3. It also can mount the FERO Z24-G 4×24 optical sight on a proprietary detachable bracket on the receiver and a clip-on winter trigger.

The G41 can also mount a detachable 40 mm HK79 grenade launcher that replaces the synthetic forearm. The weapon in this configuration is known as the G41TGS, or "Tactical Group Support".

== Variants ==
Note: the 1:178mm (1:7 in) rifling was compatible with the European-standard SS109 round and the 1:305 mm (1:12 in) rifling was compatible with the US-standard M193 Ball round.

- G41: This is the standard model with a fixed stock and 1:178 mm (1:7 in) rifling.
- G41A1: This model has a fixed stock and 1:305 mm (1:12 in) rifling.
- G41A2: This model has a telescoping shoulder stock and 1:178 mm (1:7 in) rifling.
- G41A3: This model features a telescopic stock and a 1:305 mm (1:12 in) rifling pitch.
- G41K: This is a carbine (K—Karabiner) variant of the G41A2 with a shortened 380 mm (15.0 in) barrel (reduced in length to the base of the foresight), 1:178 mm (1:7 in) rifling twist rate and a telescopic stock. The G41K is too short to accept the HK79 or fire rifle grenades.
- G41TGS: The "Tactical Group Support" model adds a HK79 grenade launcher.
- LF G41: Luigi Franchi made a sample run of the G41, G41A2 and G41K in 1988 for possible production under license; these were later modified for trials by the Italian Army. It differed from the Heckler & Koch model in that it had a polygonal 4-groove barrel with a chromed bore. When the G41 was rejected by the German Bundeswehr in 1989, it was dropped from consideration and the improved Beretta AR70/90 was chosen instead in 1990. The LF G41 however entered use with the Italian commando frogmen (COMSUBIN).
- LF Mod. 641: A modified variant of the G41 also intended to replace the BM59. It lost out to the AR70/90.

== Users ==
- Argentina: Small quantities adopted by the Grupo de Operaciones Especiales of the Argentine Air Force.
- Denmark: Small quantities adopted by the Frogman Corps and Jaeger Corps.
- India: Some acquired for Para commandos.
- Spain: Small quantities adopted by the Special Intervention Unit (Unidad Especial de Intervención; UEI) and the Spanish National Police force's GEO counter-terrorist unit who employ the G41TGS.
- Turkey: Used by the Gendarmerie Special Operations during the 1990s, very few being used by Gendarmerie General Command conscripts.

== See also ==
- CETME Model L
- Heckler & Koch HK33 – Assault rifle developed by Heckler & Koch

== Bibliography ==
- Badri-Maharaj, Sanjay (2021). Operation Cactus: Indian Military Intervention in the Maldives, 1988. Helion & Company. ISBN 978-1914377020.
- Walter, John (2006). Rifles of the World (3rd ed.). Iola, WI: Krause Publications. ISBN 978-0-89689-241-5.
- Wozniak, Ryszard (2001). "p. 22-23". Encyklopedia najnowszej broni palnej - tom 2 G-Ł (in Polish). Warsaw, Poland: Bellona. ISBN 83-11-09310-5.
