= Special Operations Group (Portugal) =

Police tactical unit of Portugal

- Grupo de Operações Especiais (Portuguese)
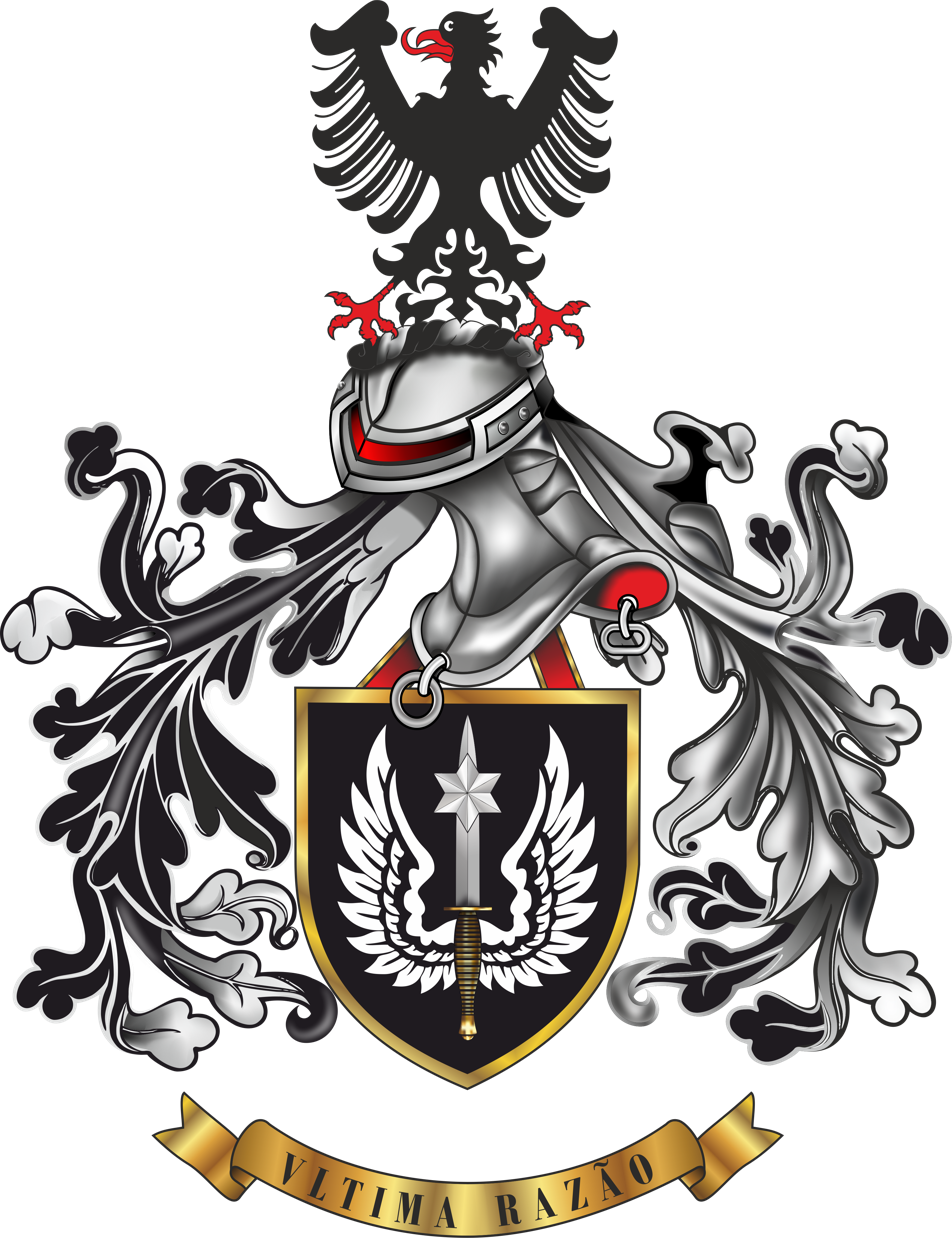
- GOE coat of arms
- Active: 29 March 1982 - present
- Country: Portugal
- Agency: Polícia de Segurança Pública
- Type: Police tactical unit
- Operations jurisdiction: National
- Part of: Special Police Unit (Unidade Especial de Polícia (Portuguese))
- Headquarters: Lisbon
- Motto: Última Razão; The Last Resort
- Abbreviation: GOE

Structure
- Officers: 210

Notables
- Significant operation(s): Turkish embassy attack in Lisbon (1983); Defenortuguese embassy in Zaire (1997); Defense of Portuguese embassy in Guinea-Bissau (1998); Rescue of French citizens held in cultural center in Bissau (1999); Espírito Santo Bank of Campolide robbery with hostages in Lisbon (2008)

The Special Operations Group (Portuguese: Grupo de Operações Especiais, GOE) is the tier one police tactical unit of the Public Security Police (PSP), the national police force of Portugal. GOE was created in 1982 and has around 200 operatives. Although a police unit, the GOE is employed worldwide, similar to the French GIGN or to the German GSG 9.

== History ==
In 1978, Quinta das Águas Livres in Sintra was acquired and the construction works of the infrastructures necessary to organise the instruction activities and to accommodate the distinct elements that would form a future operational group began. Alongside, also began studies regarding the creation of the GOE and, with the co-operation of the British government, thanks to the efforts of Mota Pinto's government, elements of the British Army 22nd Special Air Service Regiment (22 SAS) came to Portugal to train and start the formation of a special tactical police group able to conduct anti-irregular forces in urban areas, apprehension of armed and dangerous criminals, high-risk tactical law enforcement situations, operating in difficult to access terrains, urban counterterrorism and hostage rescue crisis management, and VIPs protection missions.

On March 29, 1982, the first COE – Curso de Operações Especiais (Special Operations Course) began (not to be mistaken with CTOE's COE). The course ended on November 18 of the same year; the unit was considered to be totally operational and with an intervention capability since the end of 1982, although it was formally created in 1979. As a result of that approach between the British SAS and the Portuguese GOE, the pictures of the first agents are hard to distinguish between British and Portuguese since their uniforms, equipment and weaponry are identical. Later, GOE, still maintaining a strong relationship with the SAS, also began training with the United States Delta Force, Germany's GSG 9, Spain's Guardia Civil Anti-Terrorist units, Ireland's Garda ERU, and Israeli's Sayeret Matkal and Yamam units. GOE is also part of the European ATLAS Network.

GOE's capabilities were put to the test in June, 1983, when Armenian commandos, using rented cars, invaded the residence of the Turkish ambassador and wounded a PSP officer who was part of the embassy's security team, holding the rest of the people there hostage. The Prime-Minister, Mario Soares, gave the green light to GOE to storm the building. Before this could be attempted, the terrorists accidentally blew themselves up, resulting in 5 dead terrorists and 2 casualties (the chargé d'affaires' wife and a policeman).

Since that moment, the missions assigned to the unit became more diverse and demanding. After 1991, GOE operational elements, together with ex-operators, began missions of protection of diplomatic representatives and installations in foreign countries where there are unstable situations or armed conflicts.

The level of operators deployed to those scenarios depends on the situation. GOE also intervenes if the evacuation of Portuguese citizens is needed: in 1992 in Luanda (Angola), in 1991 and 1997 in the Democratic Republic of the Congo (former Zaire) and in other countries like Guinea-Bissau, Algeria, Macau, Bosnia and, in 2011, in Egypt. In those missions, they had to face attempts of forced entry into the diplomatic delegations by armed militants; the most serious being the missions that happened in 1997 in Zaire and in 1998 in Guinea; in the latter a grenade was launched into the embassy building where the security team was. In 2005 they were sent to Saudi Arabia and Iraq to protect the Portuguese embassies and personnel in both countries. Some were also sent into Timor-Leste in 2006.

Since 2006, the unit has the support of police elements from the famous Intervention Corps (Corpo de Intervenção, riot police unit) in the security of the Portuguese Embassies in Iraq and East-Timor. In August 2008 they were also assigned to end a robbery with hostages taking place in a Campolide, Lisbon branch of the Portuguese bank Banco Espírito Santo, involving two illegal immigrant armed robbers with Brazilian citizenship and six hostages. According to a statement from the superintendent of PSP Florbela Carrilho, after several hours of negotiations, the GOE was forced to intervene, successfully taking out one of the robbers with a sniper shot to the heart, and injuring the other with one shot through the jaw. All hostages were released, four of them shortly after the beginning of the negotiations, while the other two hostages, including a bank manager were held until the end. This intervention was generally considered very successful.

== Missions ==
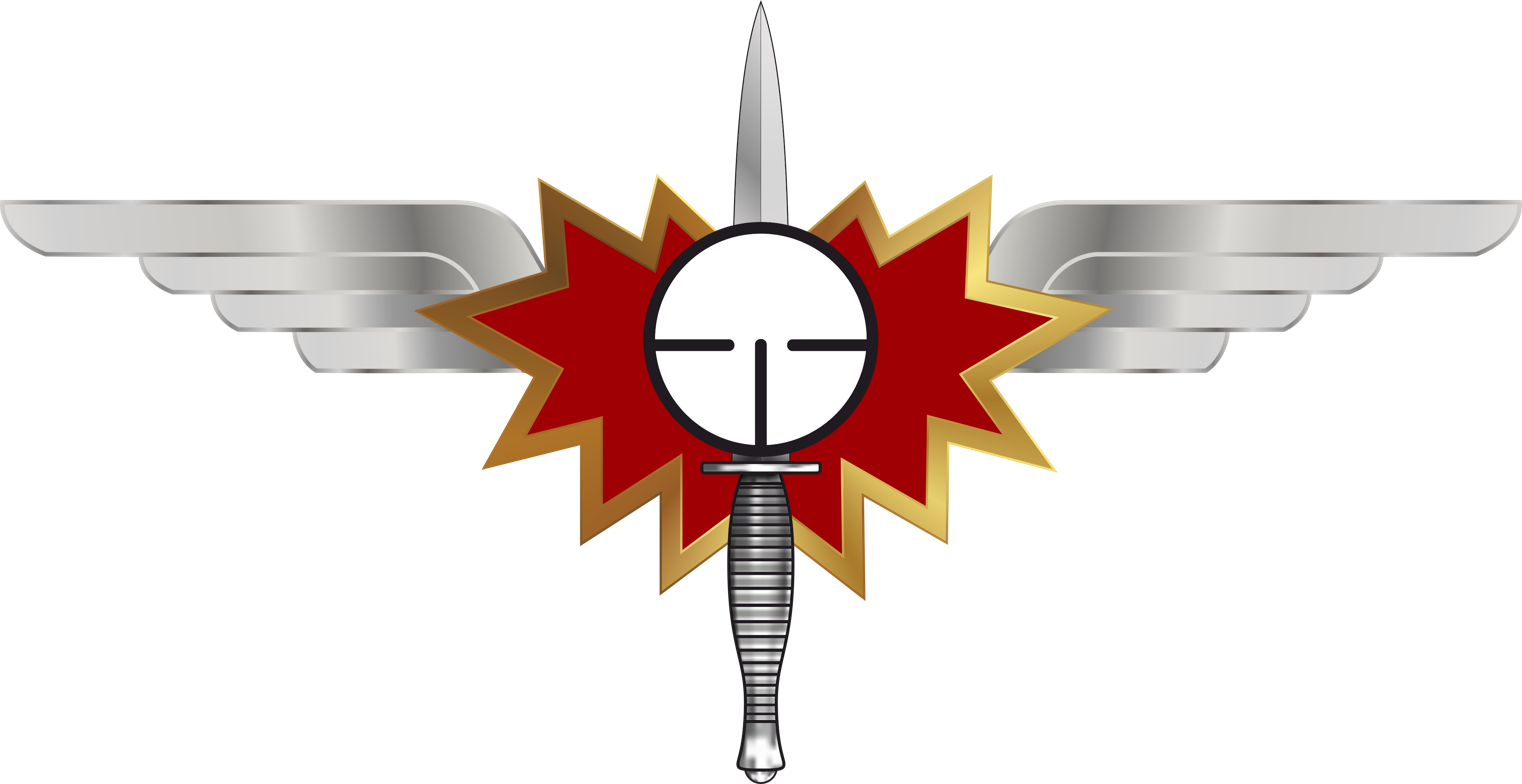
Special operations badge

- Anti-irregular forces in urban areas;
- Apprehension of armed and dangerous criminals;
- Embassy and diplomatic security in dangerous countries;
- Evacuation of Portuguese citizens from war-torn countries;
- High-risk tactical law enforcement situations;
- Hostage rescue;
- Providing security in areas at risk of attack or terrorism;
- Quick response to emergency situations with SWAT unit tactics;
- Special reconnaissance in difficult to access and dangerous areas;
- Tactical international counterterrorism and hostage rescue crisis management;
- VIPs protection.

== Equipment ==
GOE officers may use a variety of firearms to complete missions.

Model	Origin	Type
Glock 17	Austria	Semi-automatic pistol
Glock 19	Austria	Semi-automatic pistol
SIG Sauer P226	Germany	Semi-automatic pistol
SIG Sauer P228	Germany	Semi-automatic pistol
SIG Sauer GSR	United States	Semi-automatic pistol
SIG Sauer SP 2022	United States	Semi-automatic pistol
Desert Eagle	Israel	Semi-automatic pistol
Heckler & Koch MP5	Germany	Submachine gun
Heckler & Koch UMP	Germany	Submachine gun
FN P90	Belgium	Submachine gun
Benelli M4	Italy	Shotgun
Fabarm SDASS Tactical	Italy	Shotgun
Heckler & Koch HK416A5	Germany	Assault rifle
H&K G36	Germany	Assault rifle
SIG Sauer MCX	United States	Assault rifle
Accuracy International Arctic Warfare	United Kingdom	Sniper rifle
Mercedes-Benz Sprinter	Germany	Vehicle
Alpine Armoring Pit-Bull FX	United States	Vehicle

== Command ==
The unit is organized as follows:

- Command
- Support Services
- UEI (Unidade Especial de Intervenção) - Special Intervention Unit, consisting of:
  - Command
  - Three GOI (Grupos Operacionais de Intervenção) - Intervention Operational Group (1st, 2nd and 3rd), each commanded by an officer and includes 20 to 25 elements
  - One GOT (Grupo Operacional Técnico) - Technical Operational Group (4th) responsible for instruction, handling explosives, police dogs and other technical instruments, such as cameras and night vision devices.

== Macau GOE ==
As a former Portuguese colony, Macau set up their special police unit in 1993 with the same name of Grupo de Operações Especiais.

Like the Hong Kong Special Duties Unit (SDU) trained by the British Army Special Air Service (SAS), the Macau GOE functions similarly to the Portuguese GOE, in that they respond to acts of urban terrorism and engage heavily armed criminals in the Macau territory.

== See also ==
- List of police tactical units
- ATLAS Network
