= Lithuanian Police Force =

Lithuanian Police Lietuvos Policija
- Insignia of the Lithuanian Police

- Flag of the Lithuanian Police

Agency overview
- Formed: 1990
- Employees: 7,500 (2023)
- Annual budget: €355 million (2025)

Jurisdictional structure
- National agency: Lithuania
- Operations jurisdiction: Lithuania
- Governing body: Ministry of the Interior
- Constituting instrument: Law on Police
- General nature: Civilian police

Operational structure
- Overseen by: Ministry of Internal Affairs
- Headquarters: Saltoniškių g. 19, LT-08105 Vilnius, Lithuania
- Agency executive: Arūnas Paulauskas, Police Commissioner General

Website
- policija.lrv.lt

Law enforcement in Lithuania is the responsibility of a national police under the jurisdiction of the Interior Ministry. The main institution is the Lithuanian Police Department (Lithuanian: Lietuvos Policijos Departamentas) led by the Police Commissar General.

== History ==
The origins of the Lithuanian police could be traced back to the Grand Duchy of Lithuania, when the first Boni Ordinis Commission (literally, Good Order Commission) was established in Gardinas in 1776 (later in Brest, Minsk, Kaunas and other cities). These institutions were directly subordinate to the Sejm of the Polish–Lithuanian Commonwealth. However, the regional magnates were resisting the reforms as they saw the new institutions as a restriction of their authority. In 1775, the Permanent Council of the Polish–Lithuanian Commonwealth established a Police department, but it did not have the authority over the Boni Ordinis Commissions and served primarily as an advisory body. In 1791, the Great Sejm established the Police Commission of the Polish-Lithuanian Commonwealth. A separate Police Commission of the Grand Duchy of Lithuania with the headquarters in Vilnius was established in 1793. It is considered to be the predecessor of the contemporary Ministry of the Interior.

The origins of the contemporary police are the volunteer militia formed in 1918 after the declaration of the Republic of Lithuania. The uniforms were approved in 1919 and the first laws regulating the police were adopted on 14 May 1920. The organisation was formally renamed to police on 1 January 1924. The police was divided into public police and criminal police. There were several reforms and reorganizations in the following years and the Police Department was established on 1 January 1935, which composed of public, border, railway, private and water police divisions. In 1927, police employed 1262 officers, while in 1940 police had 2735 officers.

The current form of police was established on 11 December 1990, following the adoption of the Law on Police. In 1991, Lithuania joined Interpol. Since joining the European Union, Lithuania is also a member of Europol.

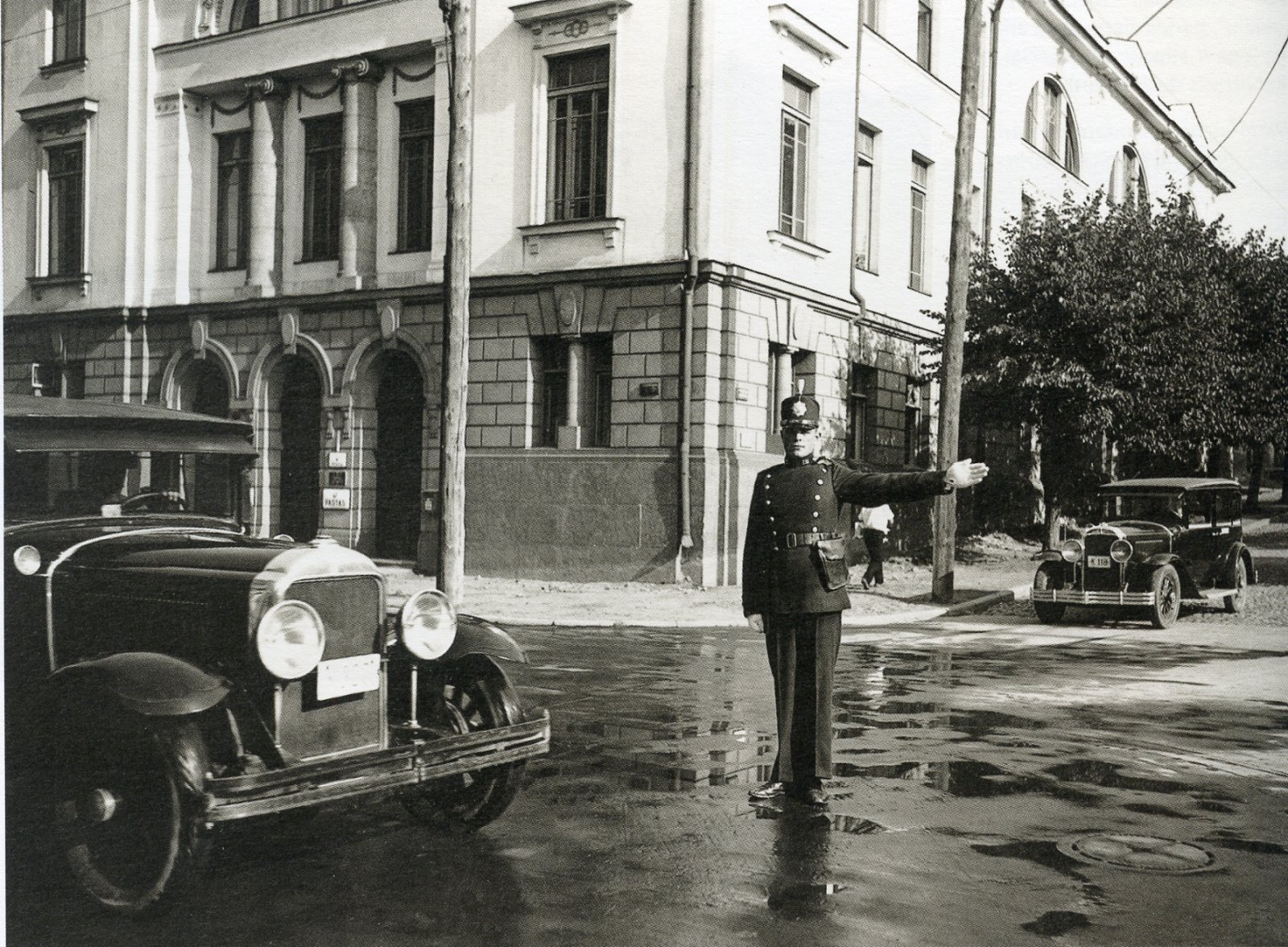
Lithuanian traffic police officer during the Interwar period.

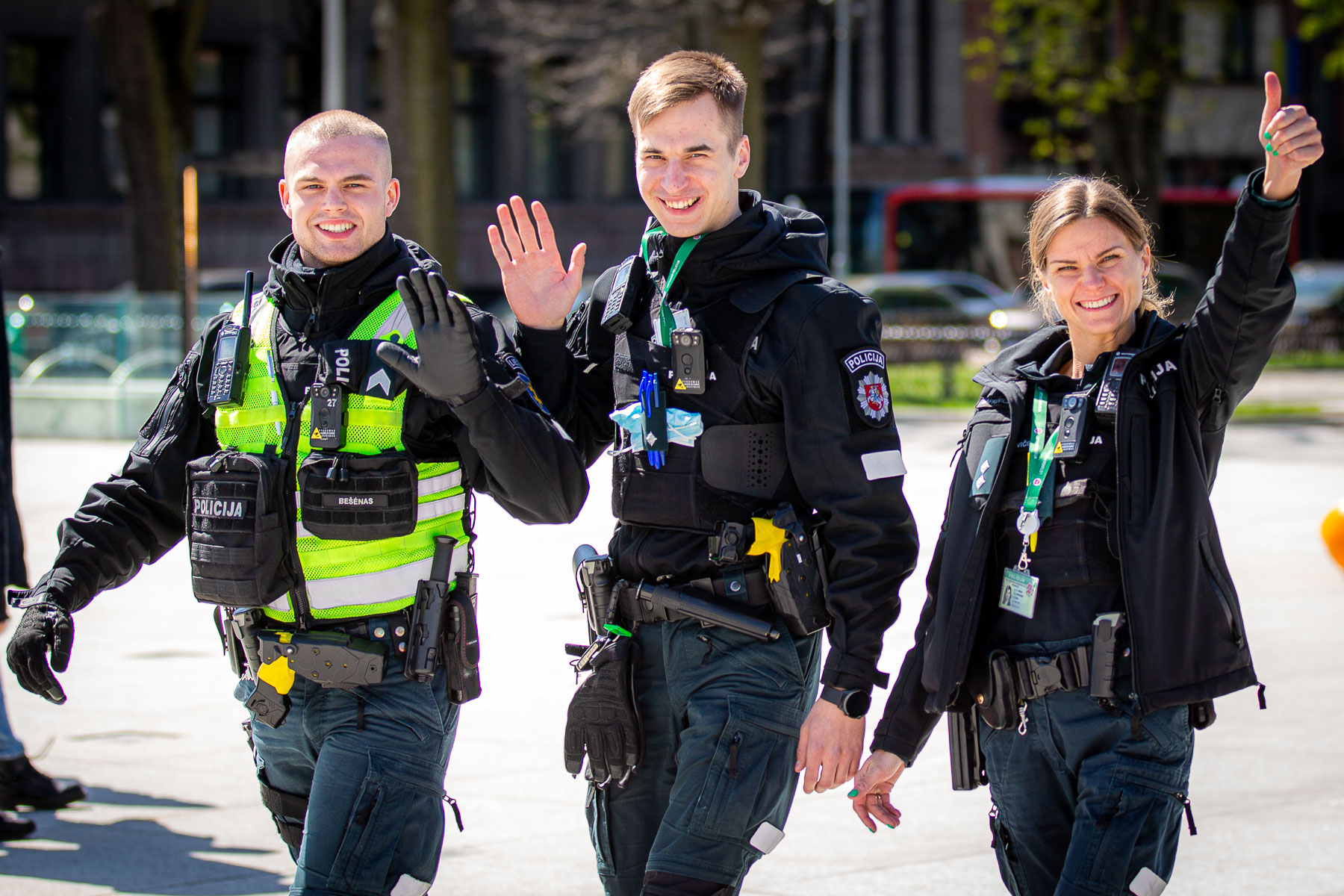
Lithuanian police officers in 2022

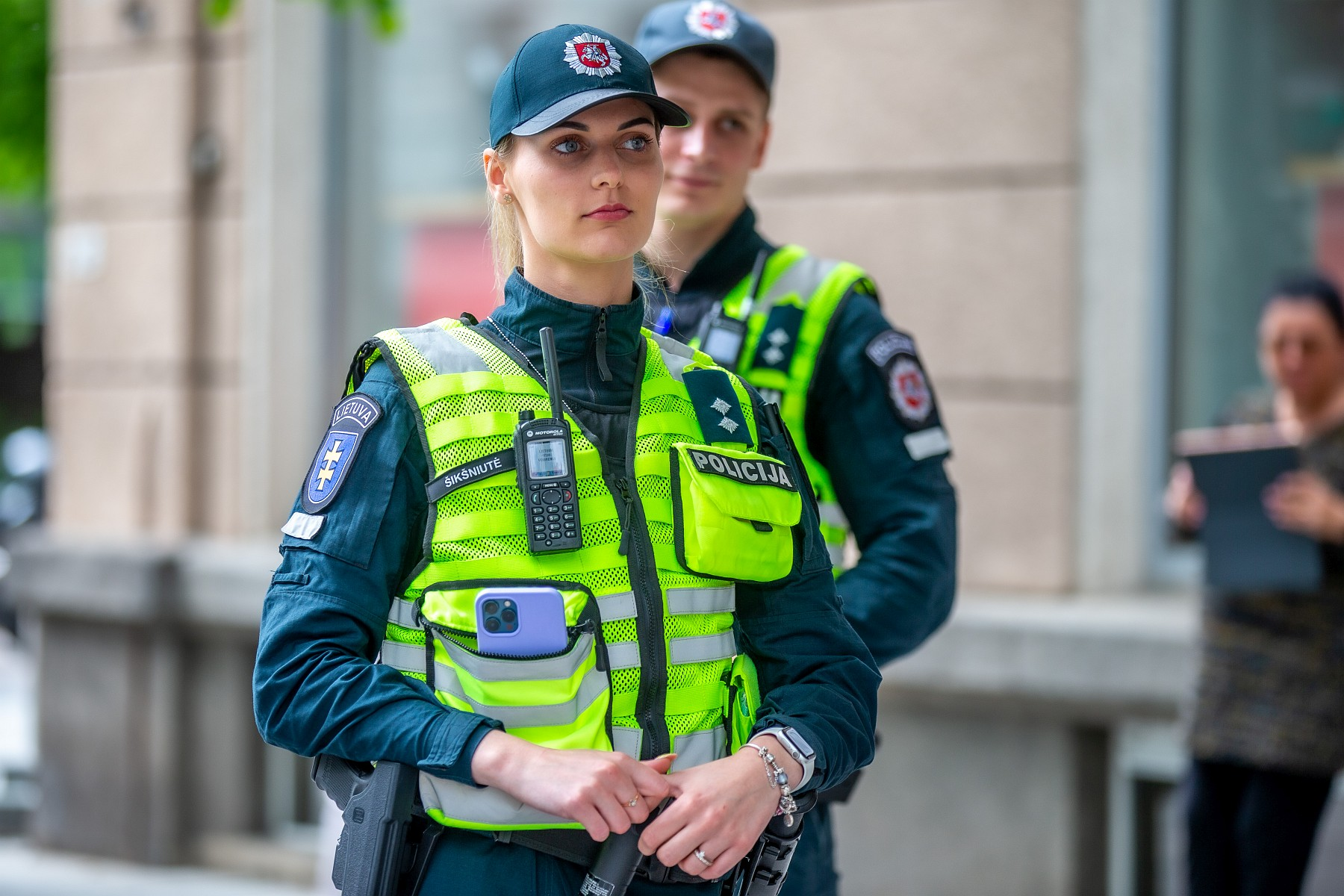
Lithuanian police officer in 2022

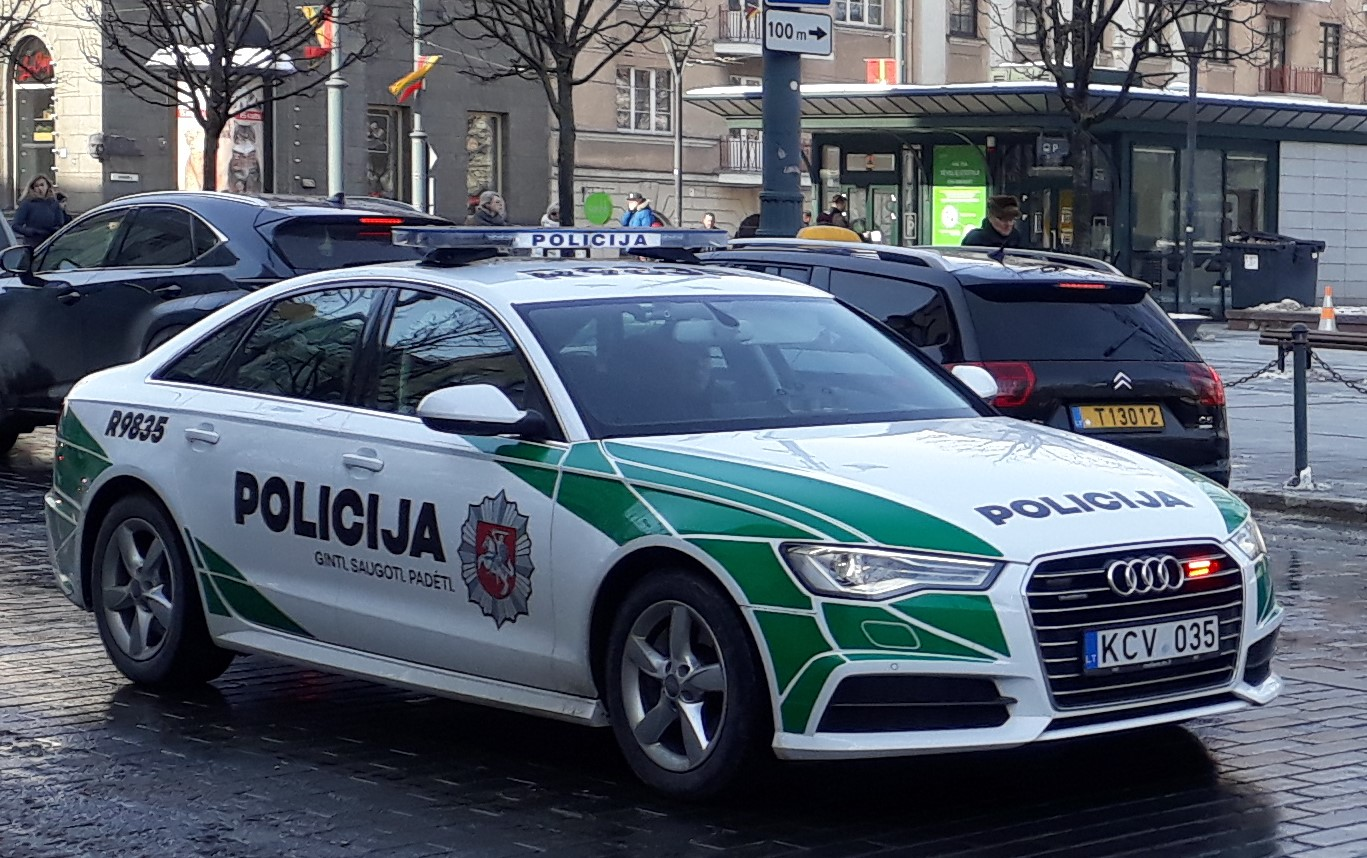
Police car in Vilnius

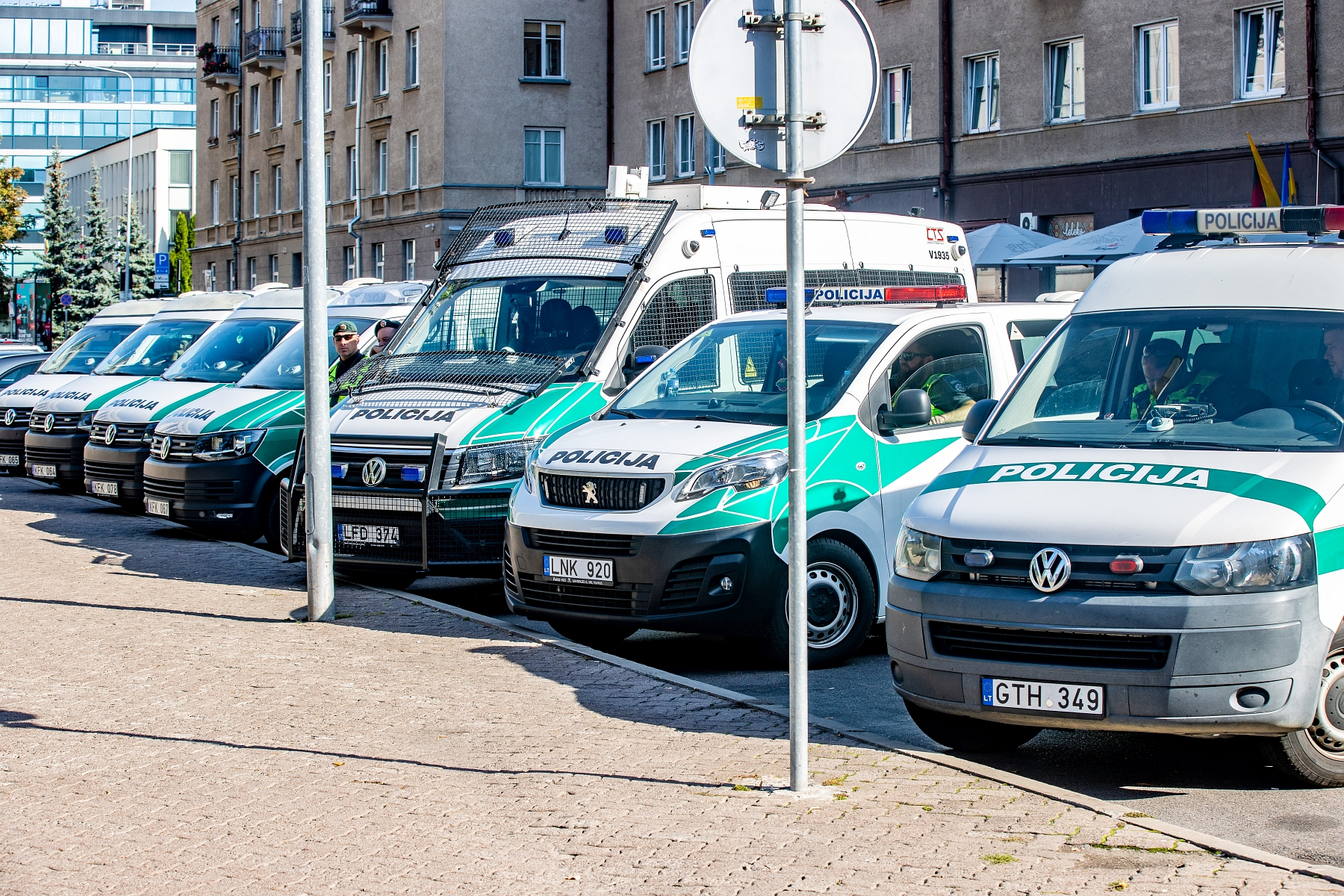
Police cars in Vilnius

== Structure and branches ==
Lithuanian Police Department is established under the Ministry of the Interior. It is led by the Police Commissioner General. The department consists of ten County Police Headquarters (Lithuanian: apskrities vyriausiasis policijos komisariatas, literally county chief police commissariat). They are further divided into sub-units of local police.

Additionally, the Police Department consists of the following specialized institutions:

- Traffic Police Service
- Criminal Police Bureau
- Police Anti-terrorist Operations Unit ARAS
- Forensic Science Centre
- Police School
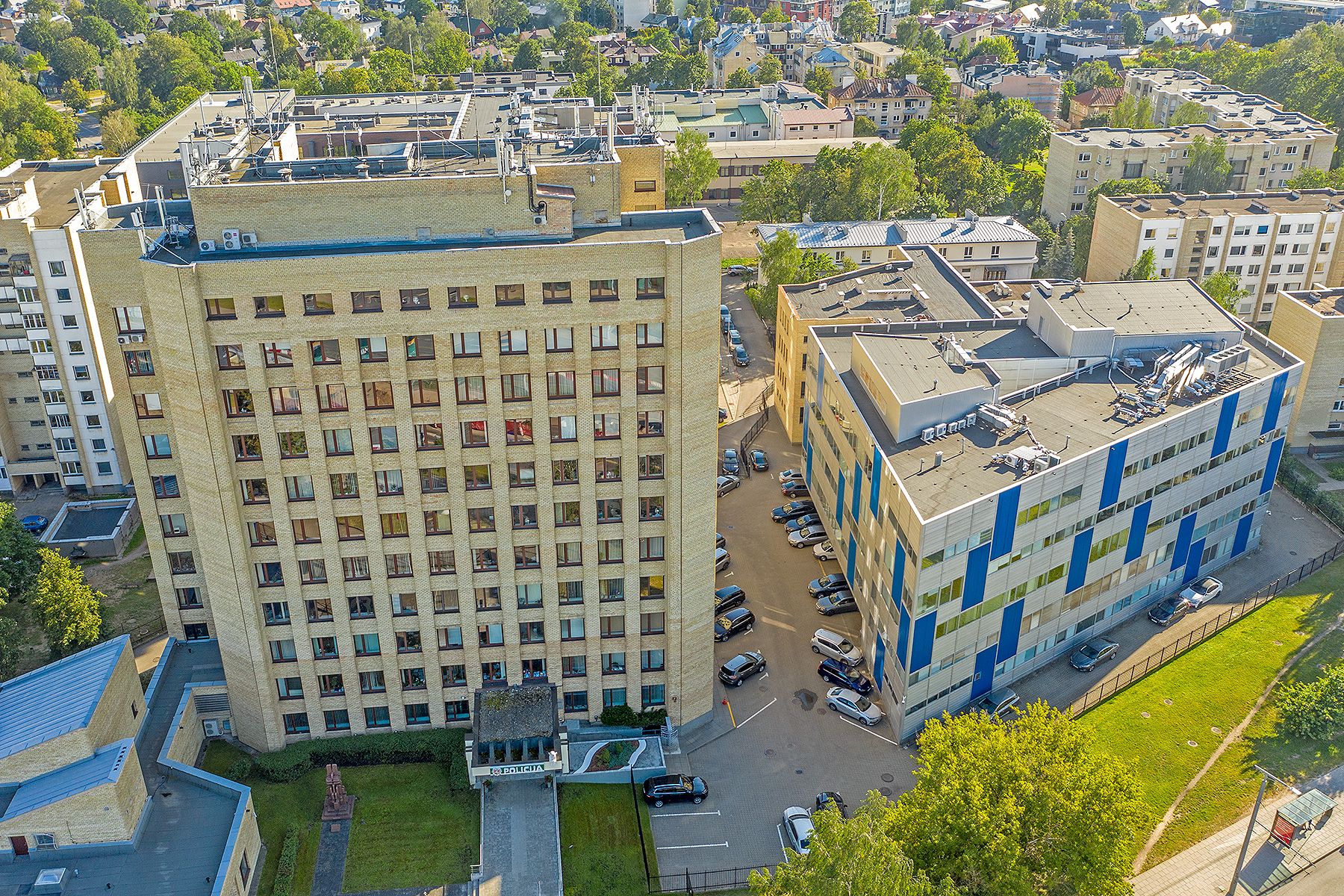
Headquarters of the Police Department (LTPD)

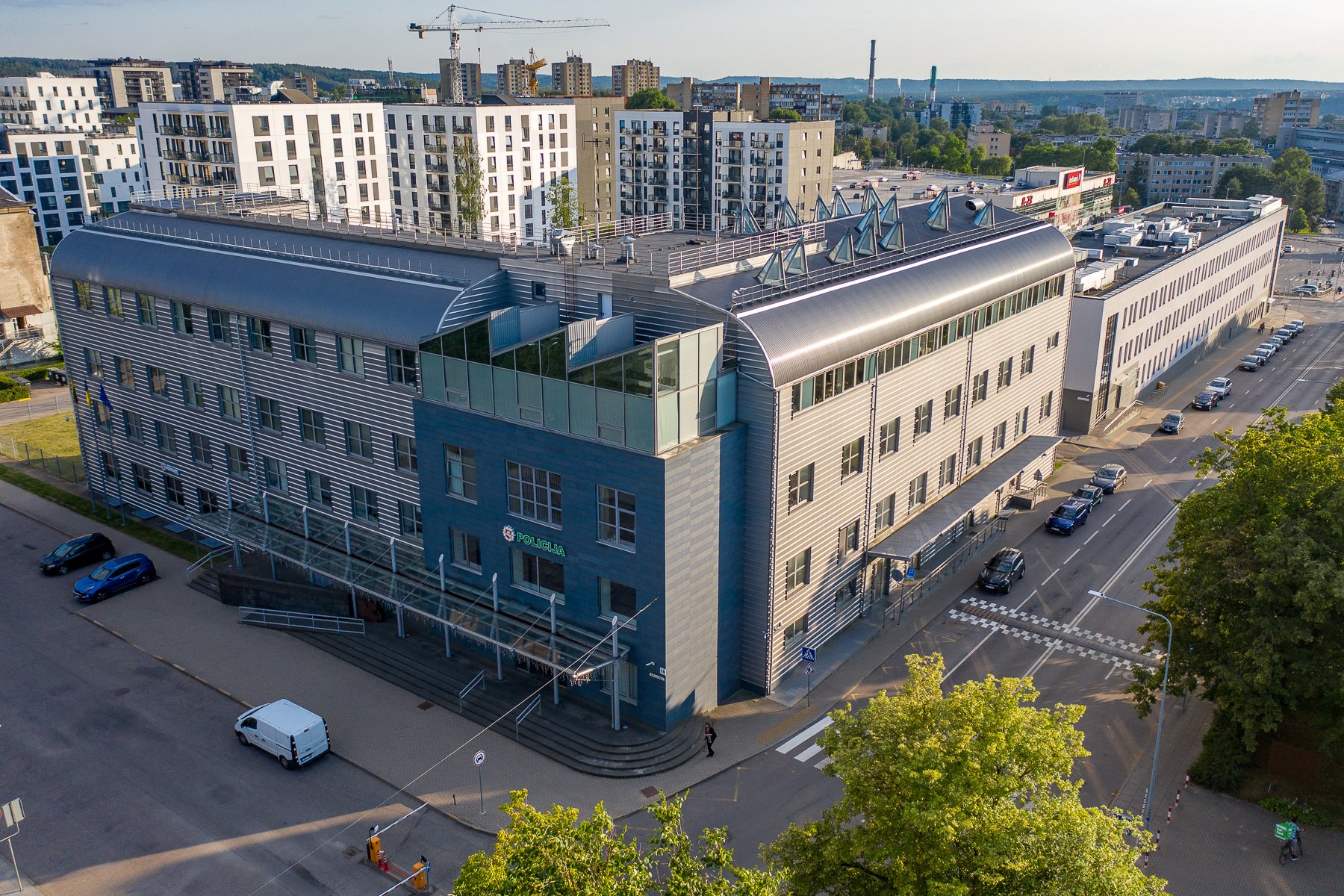
Vilnius County Police Headquarters

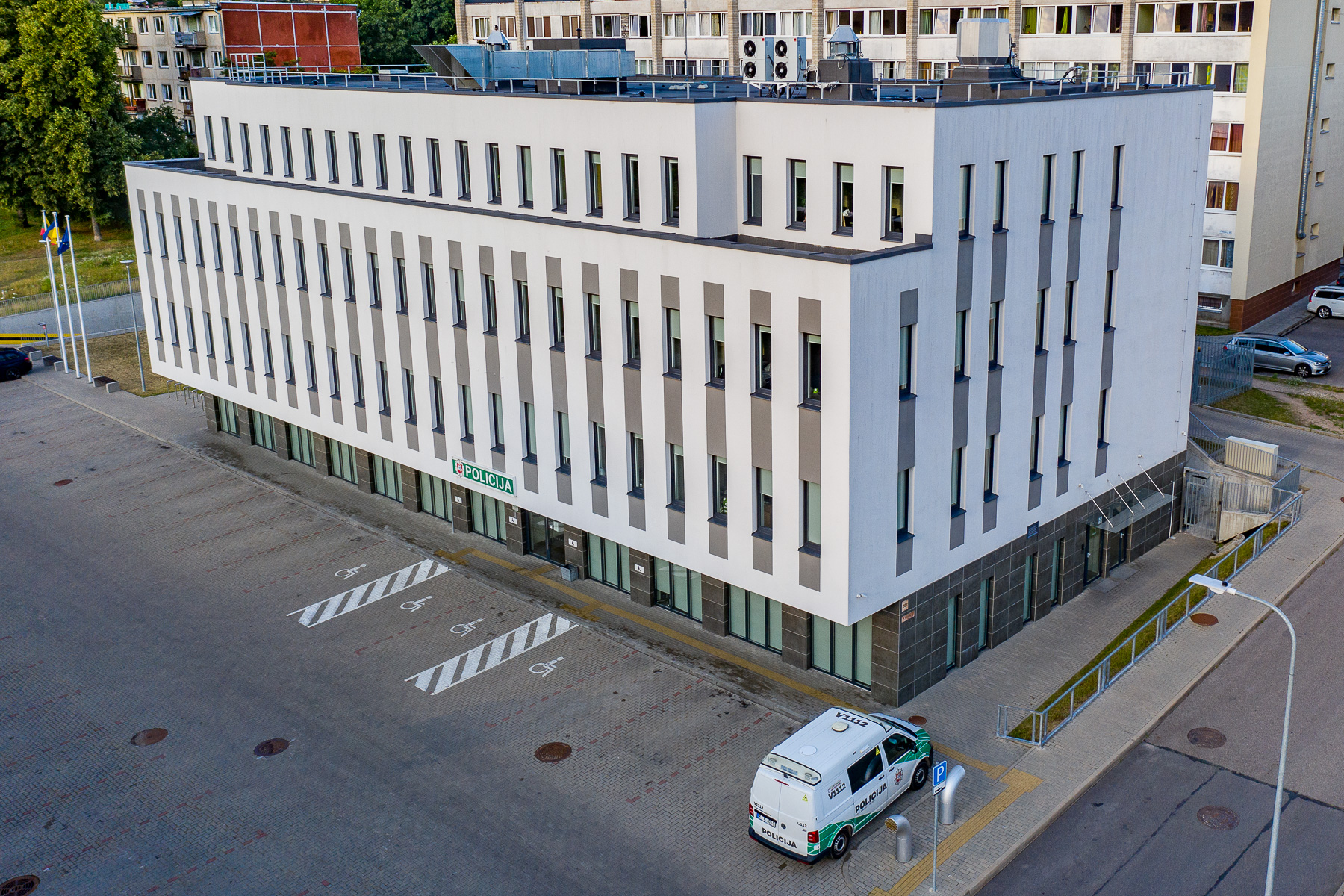
Vilnius City 1st Police Station

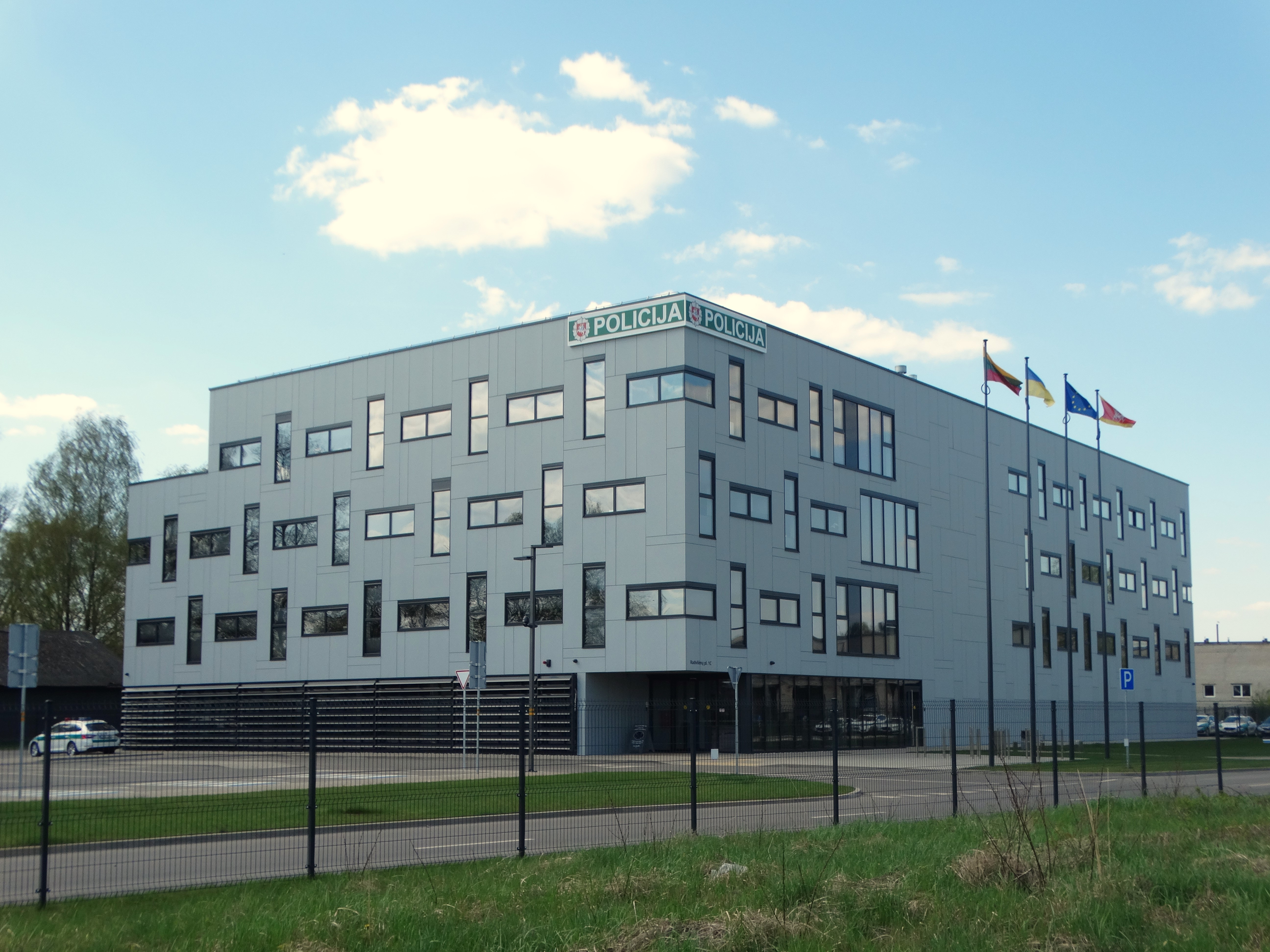
Kaunas County Police Headquarters

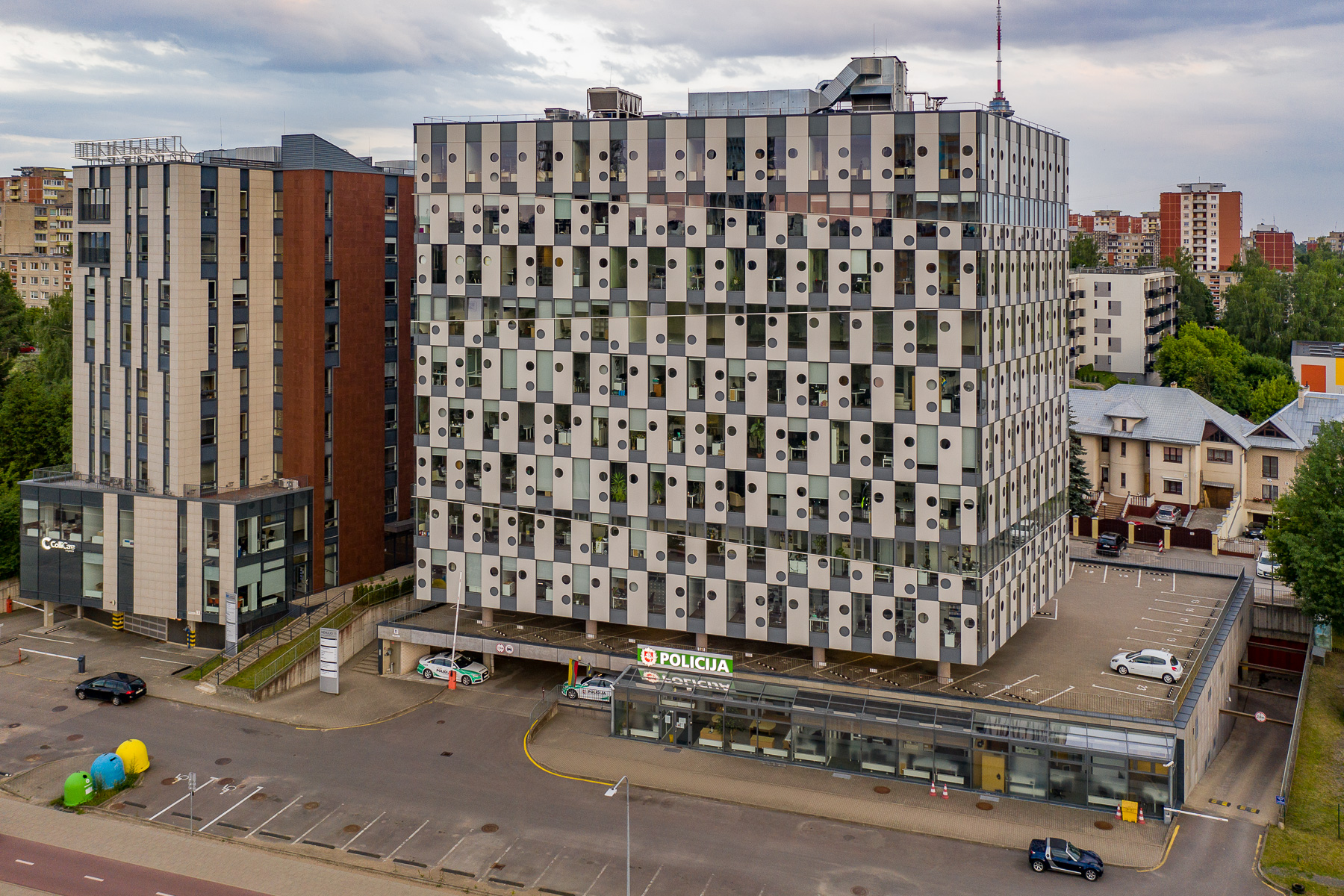
Traffic Police Headquarters

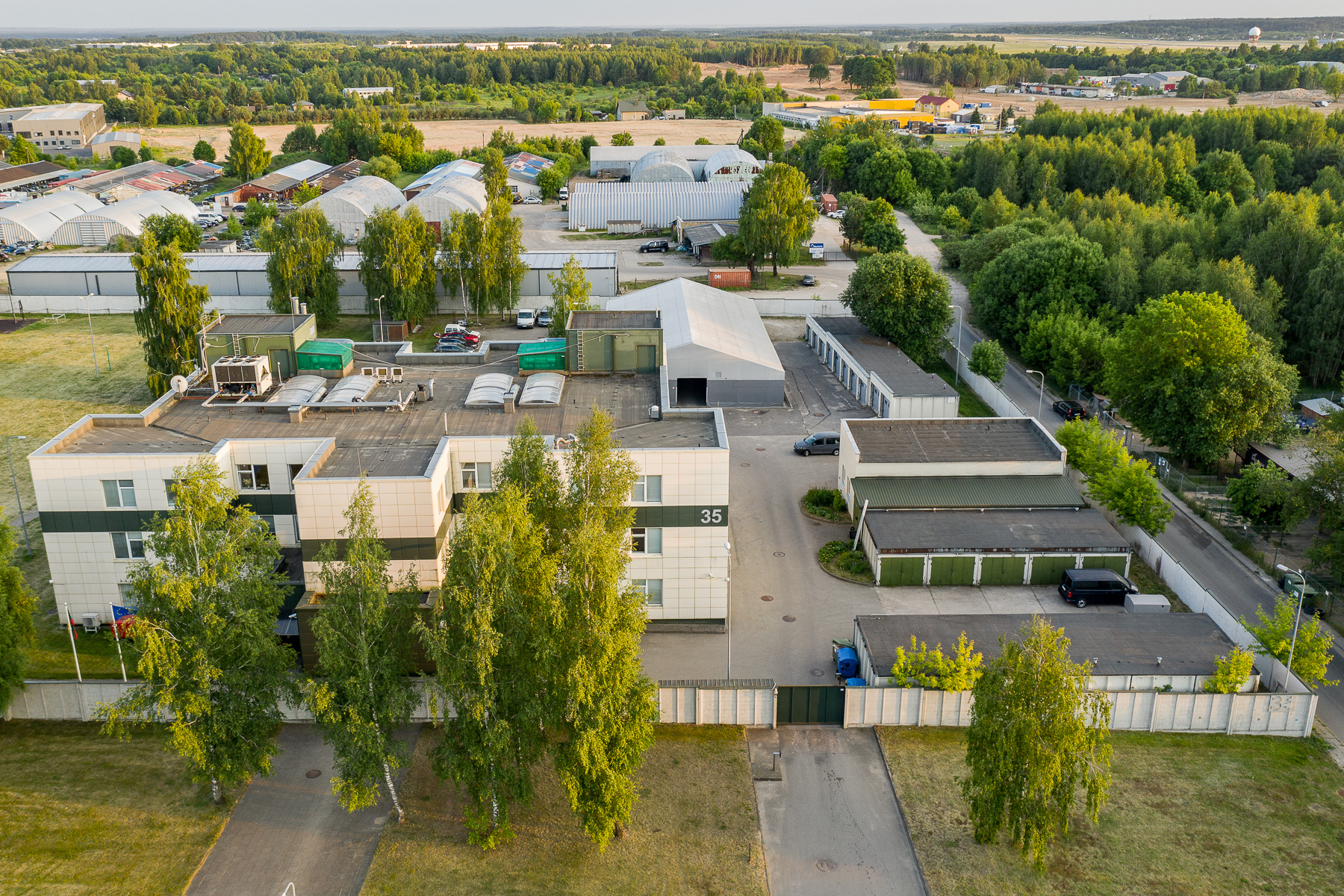
ARAS police tactical unit headquarters

== Ranks ==
Rank group	Highest officer	Senior officers			Middle officers			Junior officers
Lithuanian Police Force
Lithuanian Police Force	Generalinis komisaras	Vyriausiasis komisaras	Vyresnysis komisaras	Komisaras	Komisaras inspektorius	Vyresnysis inspektorius	Inspektorius	Jaunesnysis Inspektorius
Translation	Commissioner general	Chief commissioner	Senior commissioner	Commissioner	Commissioner inspector	Senior inspector	Inspector	Junior Inspector
