= Police tactical unit =

Specialized police unit

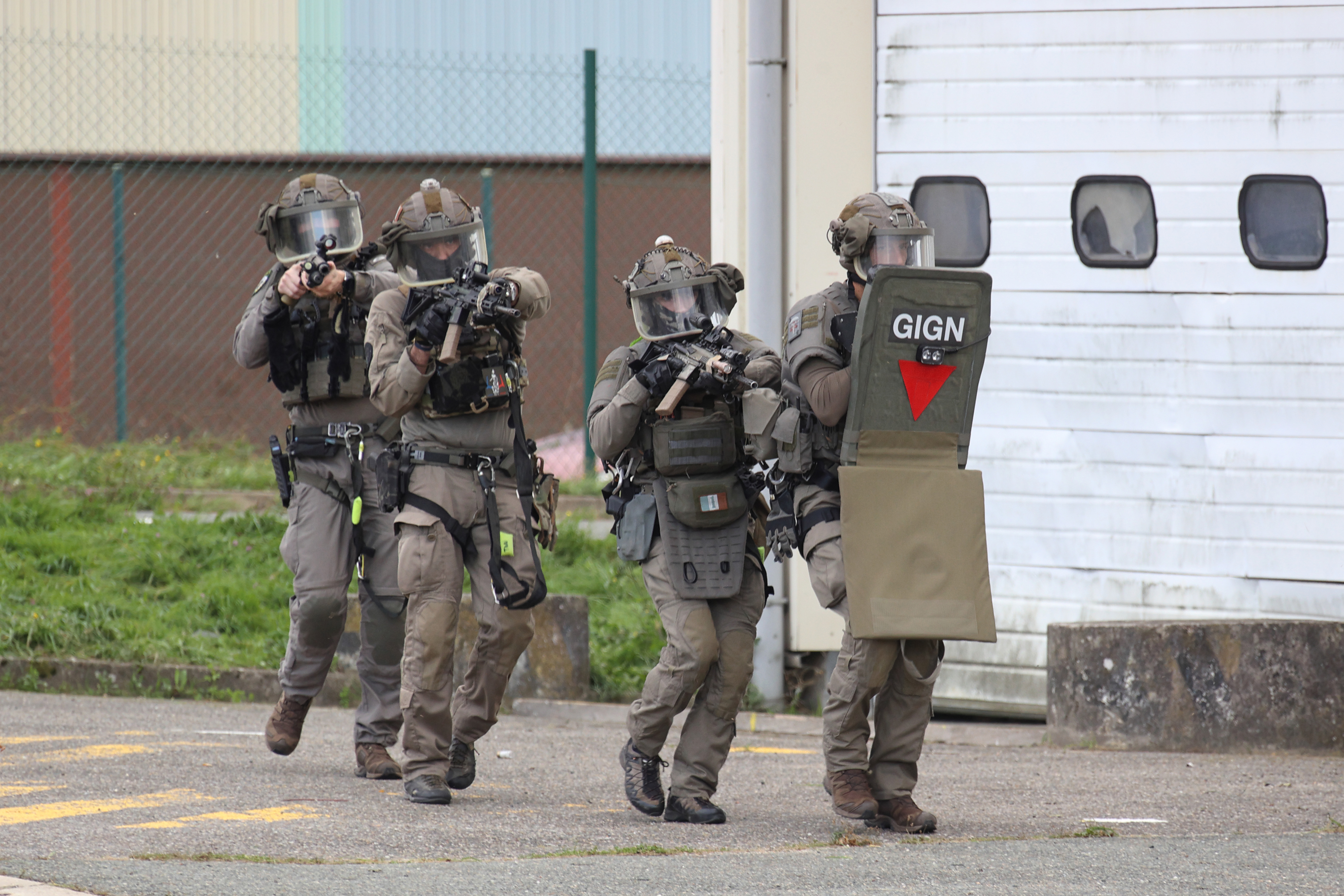
A GIGN assault column moving towards a target during training.

A police tactical unit (PTU) (Note: Some academic literature from North America uses the term "police paramilitary unit" (PPU) to describe police tactical units.) is a specialised police unit trained and equipped to handle high‑risk situations that exceed the capabilities of ordinary law‑enforcement units. They are equipped with specialised weapons and protective gear and receive tactical training appropriate for high‑risk operations. Their duties include executing high‑risk search and arrest warrants; apprehending or neutralising armed or dangerous individuals; and responding to critical incidents such as shootouts, standoffs, hostage situations, and terrorist attacks.

== Definition ==
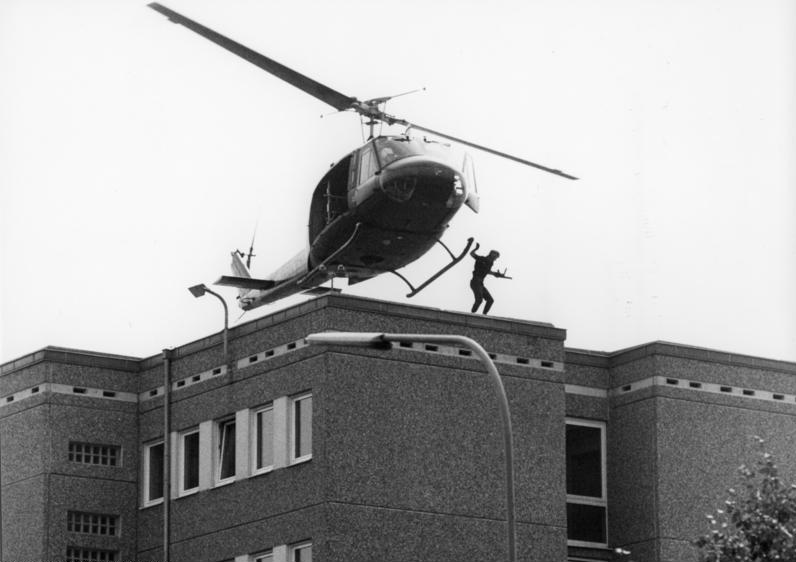
A GSG 9 operator and helicopter pictured here in 1978 during a training exercise. Formed in 1972 after the Munich massacre at the Summer Olympics to combat terrorism, GSG 9 was the first dedicated European police tactical unit formed to combat terrorism.

Police tactical units are dedicated units composed of personnel selected and trained in tactical skillsets to carry out the responsibilities of the unit, and in use-of-force policies, including lethal force for counterterrorism. They are equipped with specialised police and military‑type equipment appropriate for high‑risk operations. Some units employ specialised combat assault dogs handled by trained personnel. PTU personnel may also be trained in crisis negotiation.

A police tactical unit can be part of either a police force under the authority of civilian officials, or a gendarmerie-style force under the authority of civilian officials (interior ministry) or a defence ministry that may have formal military status. Other government agencies, depending on the country, may also maintain specialised units with similar roles, training, and equipment, such as border guards, coast guards, customs, or corrections.

In the United States, police tactical units are known by the generic term SWAT (Special Weapons and Tactics) team; the term originated from the Los Angeles Police Department SWAT formed in 1967. (Note: Earlier in the United States in 1964, the Philadelphia Police Department had formed the Special Weapons and Tactics Squad.) In Australia, the federal government uses the term police tactical group. The European Union uses the term special intervention unit for national counterterrorist PTUs.

== Characteristics ==
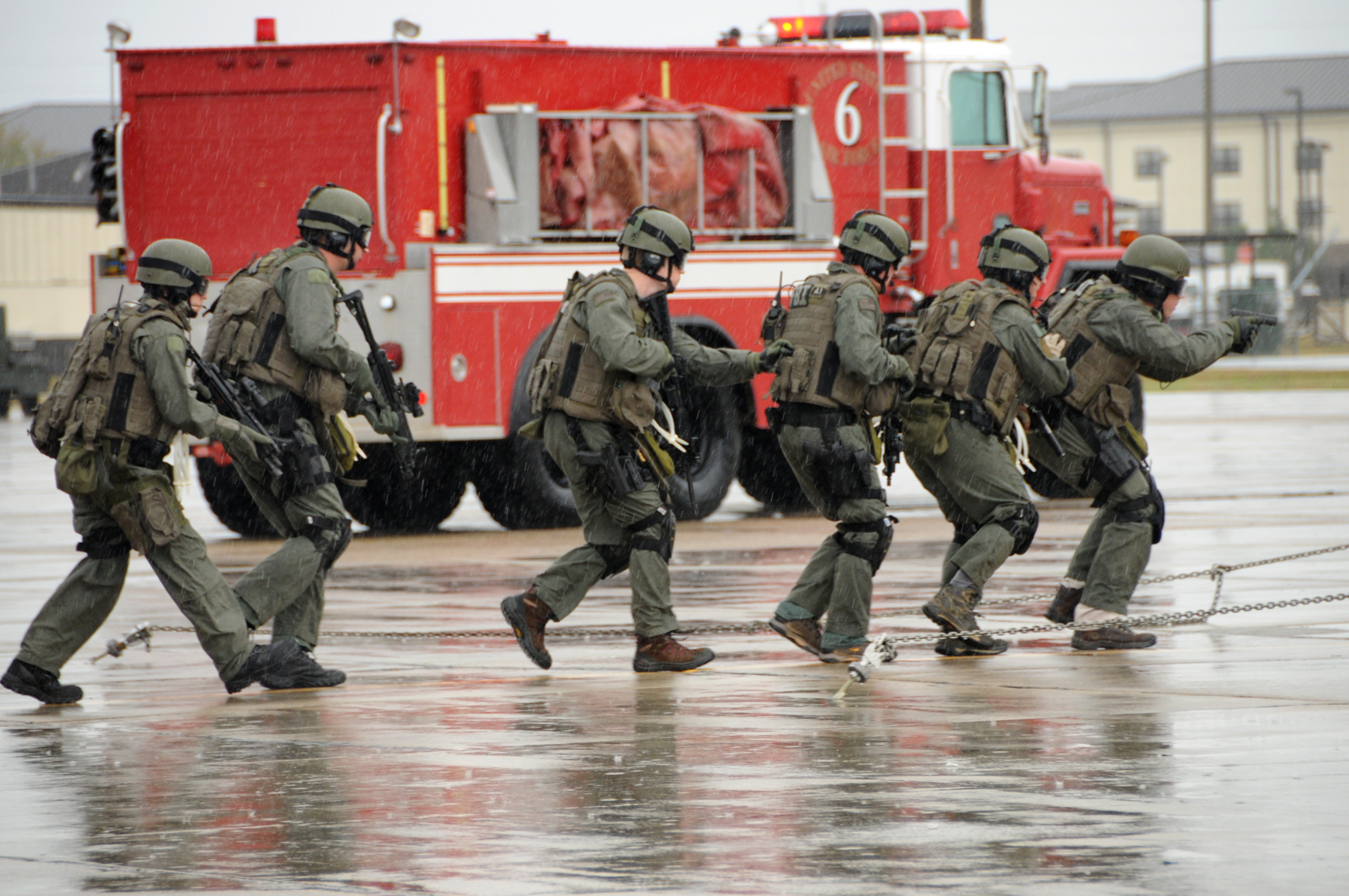
Members of an FBI SWAT team advancing on a mock aircraft during a hijacking training exercise at Keesler Air Force Base in Mississippi

Police tactical units share several characteristics with military special forces units, including organisational structure, selective recruitment, intensive tactical training, specialised equipment, and operational methods. Like many military special forces units, they are generally not gender‑diverse, and female operators remain uncommon.

In certain counterterrorism operations—particularly hostage rescue—there can be significant convergence between police tactical units and military special forces units in terms of roles, tactics, and levels of force employed. Outside such contexts, however, their roles differ markedly: military special forces units may employ the maximum permissible force against enemy combatants, whereas police tactical units are required to use only the minimum force necessary to subdue suspects and are expected to prioritise negotiation and de‑escalation.

== See also ==
- List of police tactical units
- List of military special forces units
