= Outline of Argentina =

Country in South America

The Flag of Argentina

The Coat of arms of Argentina

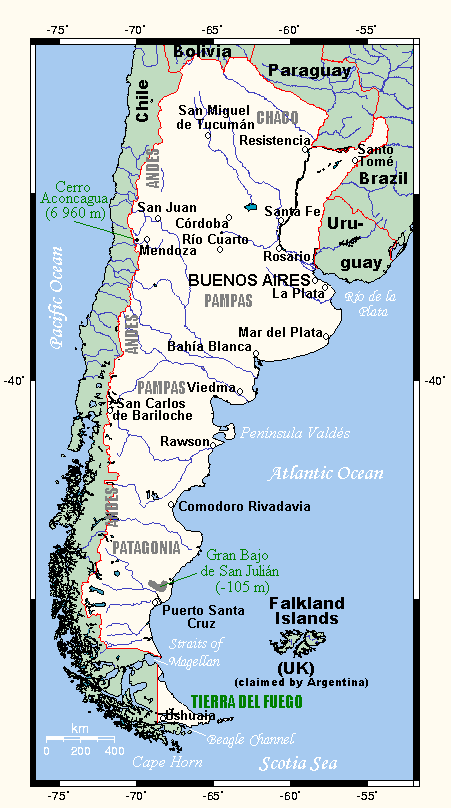
An enlargeable map of Argentina

The following outline is provided as an overview of, and introduction to Argentina:

Argentina, officially the Argentine Republic, is a country located in the southern cone of South America and with a claimed portion of Antarctica. It covers an area of 2,780,085 km^{2} (1,073,397 mi^{2}), making it the second-largest country in South America after Brazil, the fourth-largest country in the Americas, and the eighth-largest country in the world. Argentina shares the bulk of the Southern Cone with Chile to the west, and is also bordered by Bolivia and Paraguay to the north, Brazil to the northeast, Uruguay and the South Atlantic Ocean to the east, and the Drake Passage to the south. Argentina is a federal state subdivided into twenty-three provinces, and one autonomous city, which is the federal capital and largest city of the nation, Buenos Aires. The provinces and the capital have their own constitutions, but exist under a federal system. Argentina claims sovereignty over the Falkland Islands, South Georgia and the South Sandwich Islands, the Southern Patagonian Ice Field, and a part of Antarctica.

== General reference ==
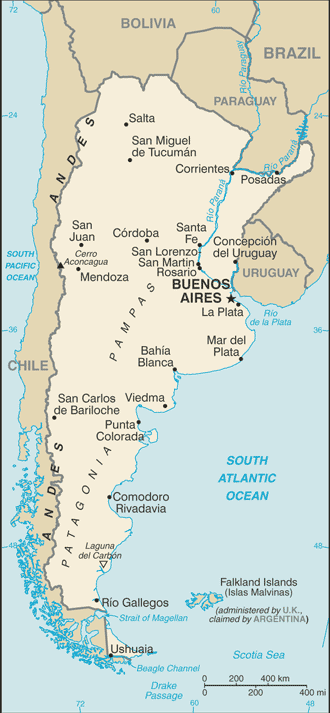
An enlargeable basic map of Argentina

- Pronunciation: /ˌɑːrdʒənˈtiːnə/
- Common English country name: Argentina
- Official English country name: The Argentine Republic
- Common endonym(s): Argentina
- Official endonym(s): República Argentina
- Adjectival(s): Argentine
- Demonym(s):
- Etymology: Name of Argentina
- International rankings of Argentina
- ISO country codes: AR, ARG, 032
- ISO region codes: See ISO 3166-2:AR
- Internet country code top-level domain: .ar

== Geography of Argentina ==
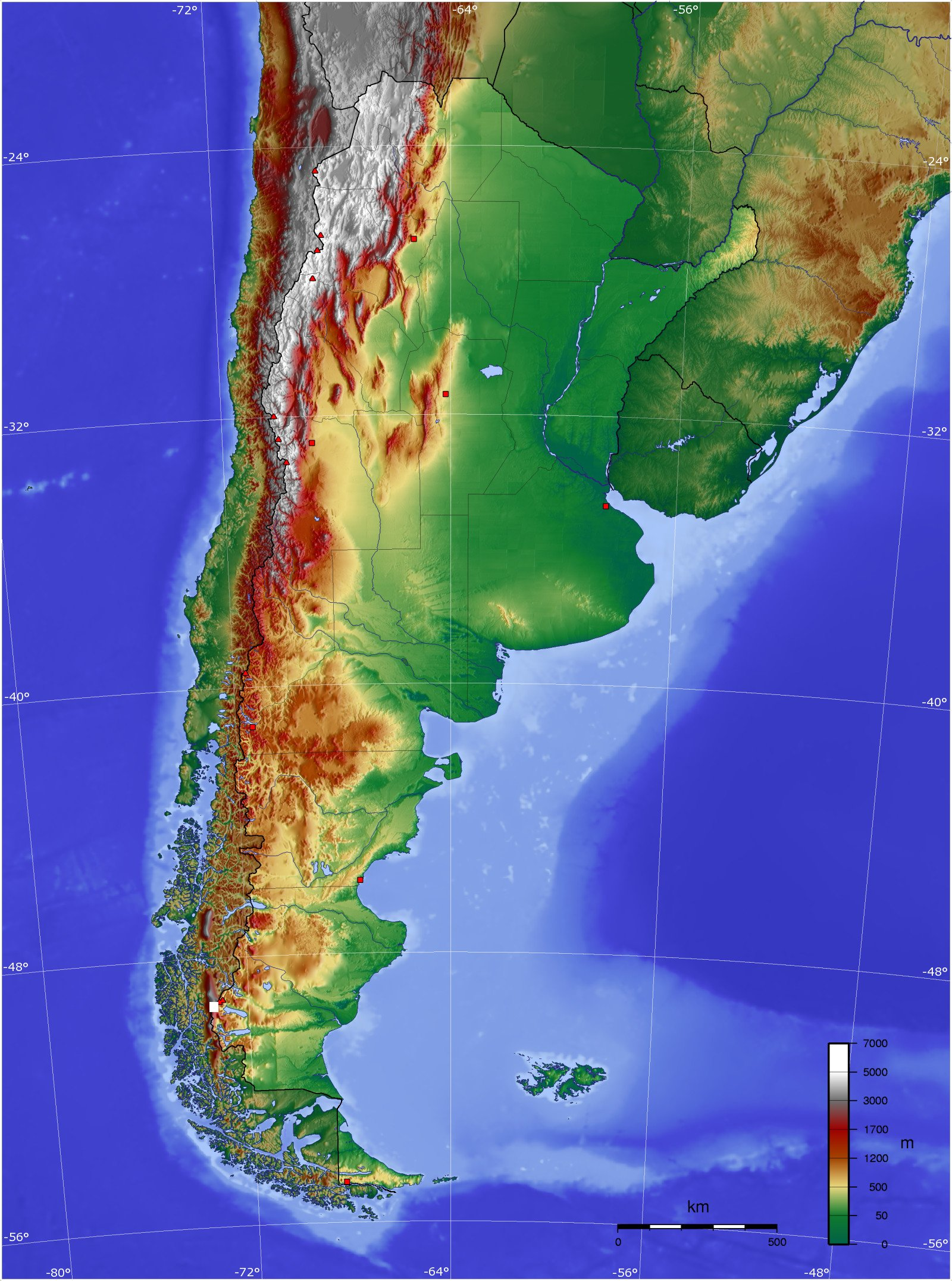
An enlargeable topographic map of Argentina

- Argentina is a: Country
- Location:
  - Southern Hemisphere
  - Western Hemisphere
    - Latin America
      - South America
        - Southern Cone
  - Time zone:
    - Argentina Time - (UTC-03) - No DST
  - Extreme points of Argentina
    - High: Aconcagua 6,960 m (22,835 ft) – highest point outside of Asia
    - Low: Laguna del Carbón −105 m (−344 ft) – lowest point in the Western Hemisphere and the Southern Hemisphere
  - Land boundaries: 9,861 km

Chile 5,308 km
Paraguay 1,880 km
Brazil 1,261 km
Bolivia 832 km
Uruguay 580 km

- Coastline: 4,989 km

- Population of Argentina: 46,044,703 people (2022 estimate) - 30th most populous country
- Area of Argentina: 2,766,890 km^{2} (1,068,300 sq mi) - 8th largest country
- Atlas of Argentina

=== Environment of Argentina ===
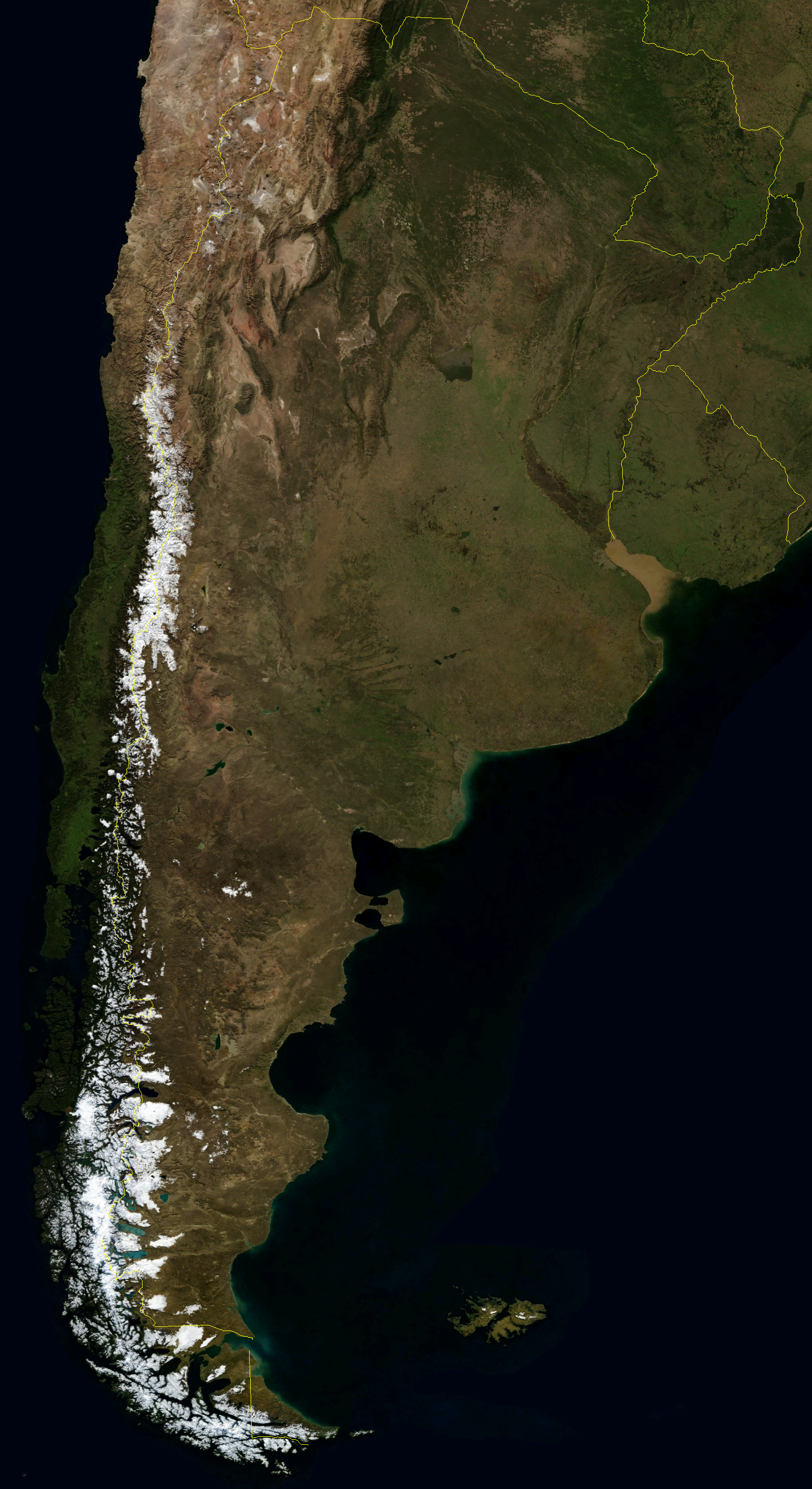
An enlargeable satellite image of the Argentina

- Climate of Argentina
- Renewable energy in Argentina
- Geology of Argentina
  - Earthquakes in Argentina
- Protected areas of Argentina
  - Biosphere reserves in Argentina
  - National parks of Argentina
- Wildlife of Argentina
  - Flora of Argentina
  - Fauna of Argentina
    - Birds of Argentina
    - Mammals of Argentina

==== Natural geographic features of Argentina ====
- Glaciers of Argentina
- Islands of Argentina
- Lakes of Argentina
- Mountains of Argentina
  - Volcanoes in Argentina
- Rivers of Argentina
- World Heritage Sites in Argentina

=== Regions of Argentina ===
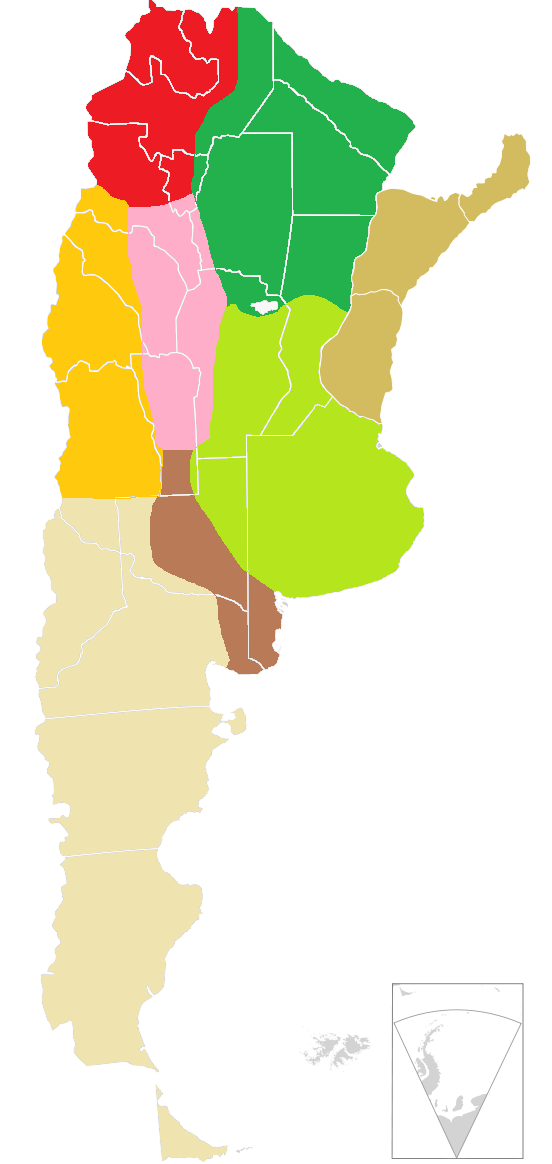
Geographical regions of Argentina:

The provinces of Argentina are often grouped into six geographical regions. From North to South and West to East, these are:

- Argentine Northwest: Jujuy, Salta, Tucumán, Catamarca, La Rioja
- Gran Chaco: Formosa, Chaco, Santiago del Estero
- Mesopotamia (or Littoral): Misiones, Entre Ríos, Corrientes
- Cuyo: San Juan, Mendoza, San Luis
- Pampas: Córdoba, Santa Fe, La Pampa, Buenos Aires
- Patagonia: Rio Negro, Neuquén, Chubut, Santa Cruz, Tierra del Fuego
- Argentine Antarctica

==== Administrative divisions of Argentina ====
Provinces of Argentina

- Autonomous City of Buenos Aires^{a}
- Buenos Aires Province
- Catamarca
- Chaco
- Chubut
- Córdoba
- Corrientes
- Entre Ríos
- Formosa
- Jujuy
- La Pampa
- La Rioja
- Mendoza
- Misiones
- Neuquén
- Río Negro^{b}
- Salta
- San Juan
- San Luis
- Santa Cruz
- Santa Fe
- Santiago del Estero
- Tierra del Fuego, Antártida e Islas del Atlántico Sur^{c}
- Tucumán

^{a} Not a Province. Autonomous City and seat of National Government.
(Also known as Buenos Aires City).
^{b} or Provincia del Río Negro.
^{c} Tierra del Fuego Province includes claims over Argentine Antarctica, Falkland Islands, and South Georgia and South Sandwich Islands.

==== Municipalities of Argentina ====
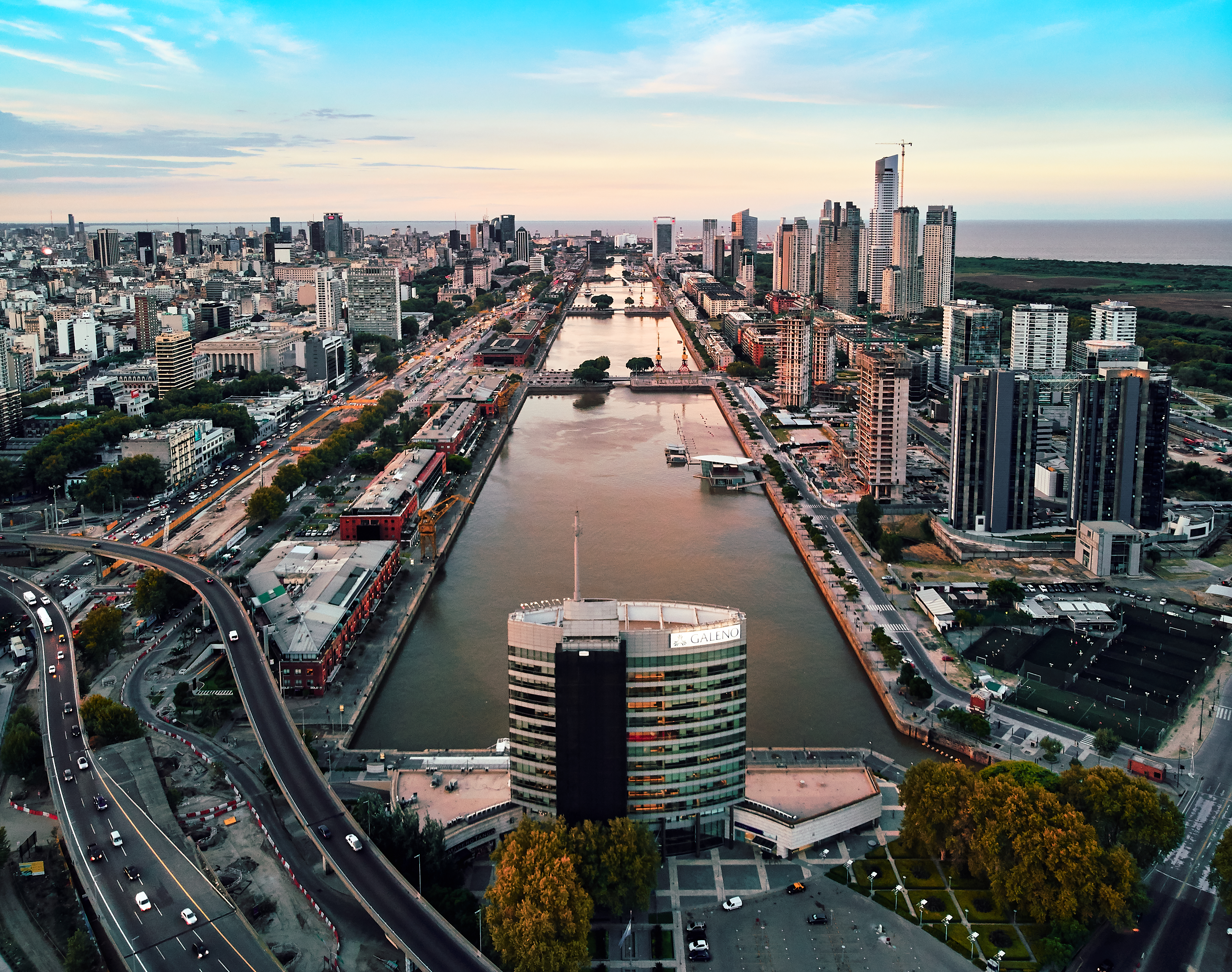
Buenos Aires, Argentina

- Cities of Argentina
  - Capital of Argentina: Buenos Aires

== Government and politics of Argentina ==
- Form of government: federal presidential representative democratic republic
- Capital of Argentina: Buenos Aires
- Elections in Argentina
  - Primary elections in Argentina
- Political parties in Argentina
- Taxation in Argentina

=== Branches of the government of Argentina ===
Government of Argentina

==== Executive branch of the government of Argentina ====
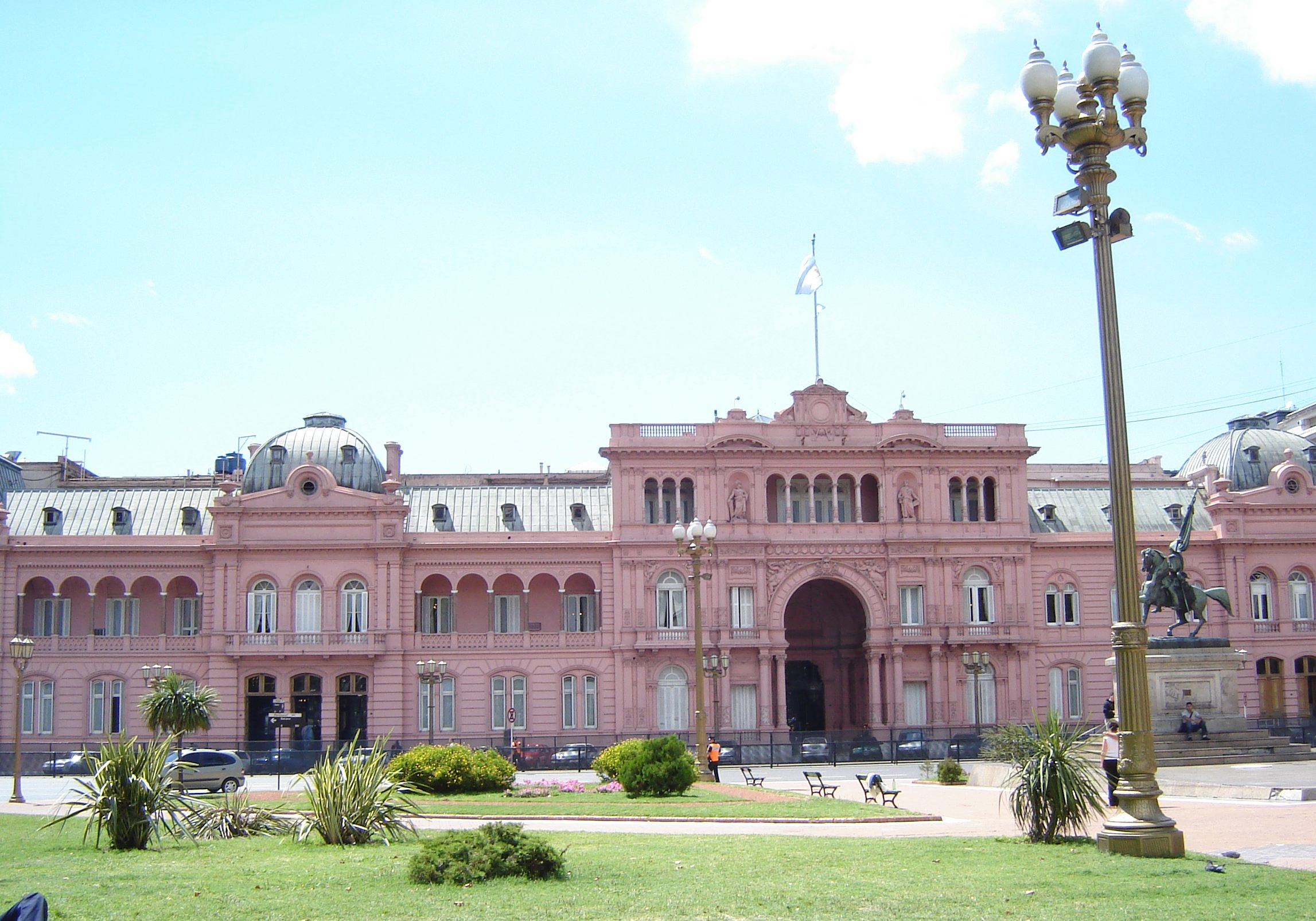
The Casa Rosada, seat of the Argentine Executive Branch of Government

- Head of state and government: President of Argentina, Javier Milei
  - Vice President of Argentina, Victoria Villarruel
- Cabinet of Argentina
- Chief of the Cabinet of Ministers

==== Legislative branch of the government of Argentina ====
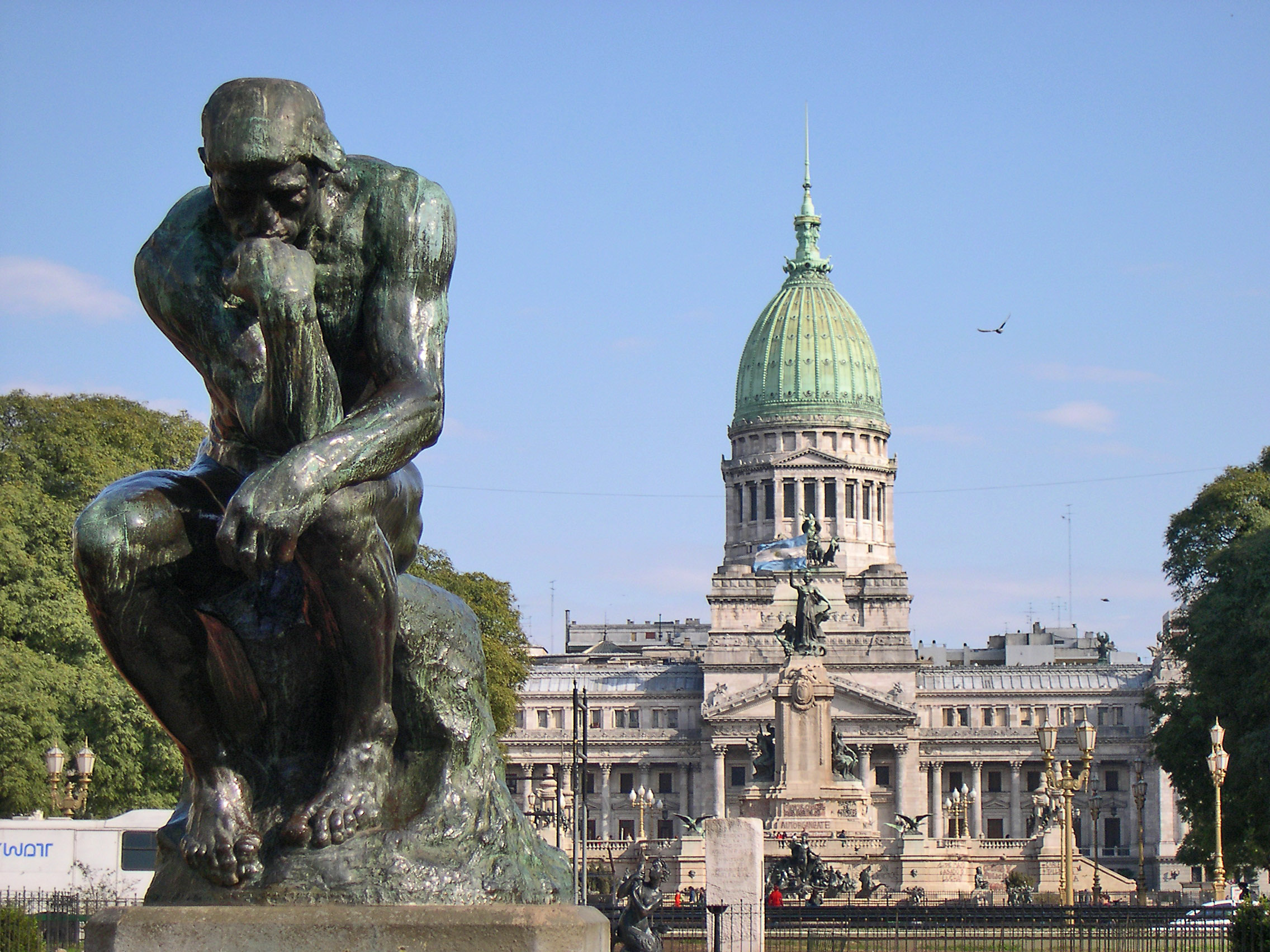
The Argentine Congress and one of the few surviving original casts of Auguste Rodin's The Thinker

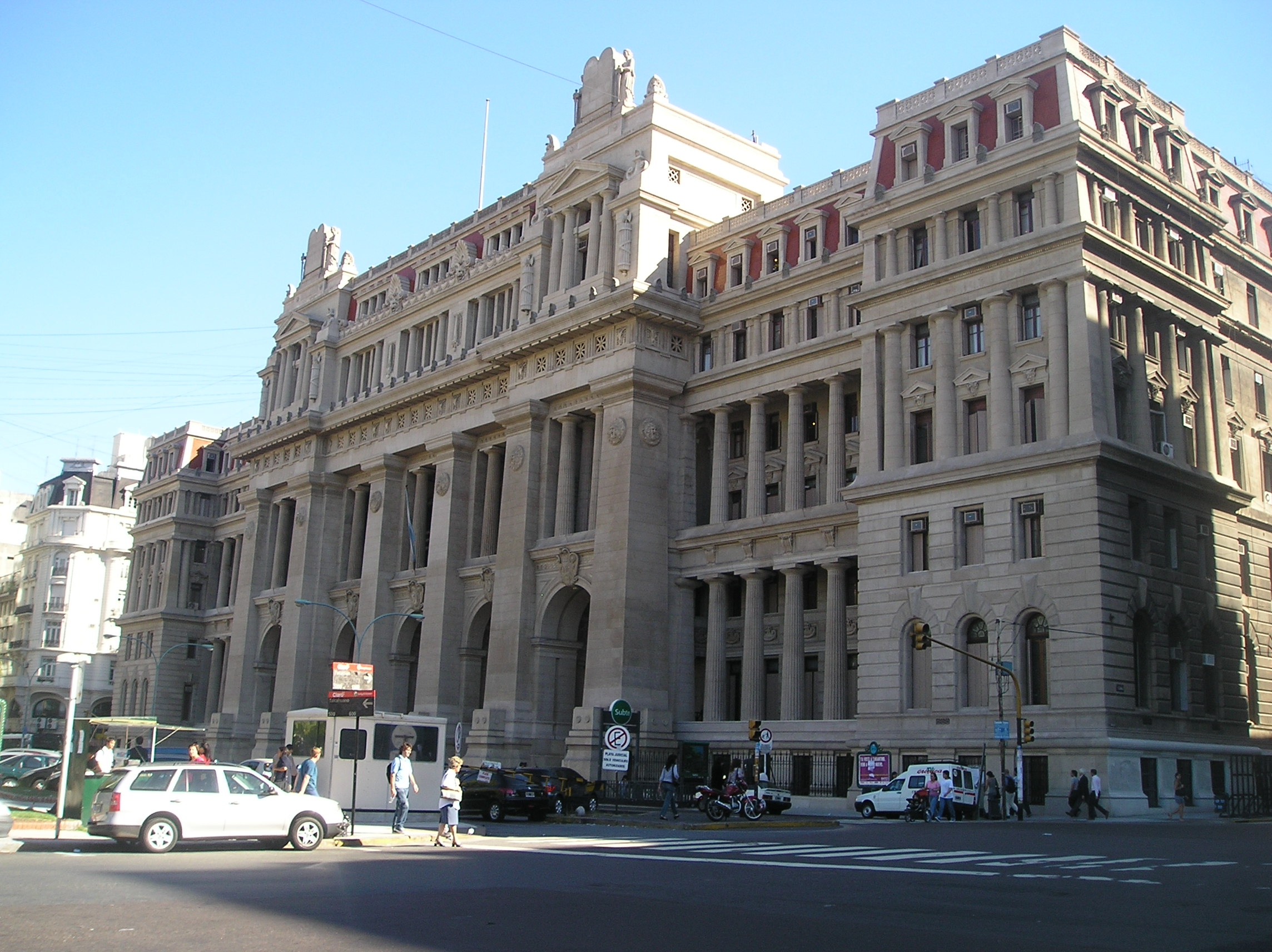
The Argentine Supreme Court

- Argentine National Congress (Congreso Nacional) (bicameral)
  - Upper house: Argentine Senate (72 seats), presided by the Vice-president
  - Argentine Chamber of Deputies (257 seats), currently presided by Emilio Monzó of Buenos Aires Province).

==== Judicial branch of the government of Argentina ====
Court system of Argentina

- Supreme Court of Argentina
  - President of the Supreme Court: Dr. Horacio Rosatti
  - Vice-president of the Supreme Court: Dr. Carlos Rosenkrantz
  - Minister of the Court: Dr. Ricardo Lorenzetti

=== Foreign relations of Argentina ===
- Diplomatic missions
  - Diplomatic missions in Argentina
  - Diplomatic missions of Argentina

==== International organization membership ====
The Argentine Republic is a member of:

- African Development Bank Group (AfDB) (nonregional member)
- Agency for the Prohibition of Nuclear Weapons in Latin America and the Caribbean (OPANAL)
- Andean Community of Nations (CAN) (associate)
- Australia Group
- Bank for International Settlements (BIS)
- Central American Bank for Economic Integration (BCIE)
- Central American Integration System (SICA) (observer)
- Food and Agriculture Organization (FAO)
- Group of 15 (G15)
- Group of Twenty Finance Ministers and Central Bank Governors (G20)
- Group of 24 (G24)
- Group of 77 (G77)
- International Astronautical Federation (IAF)
- Inter-American Development Bank (IADB)
- International Atomic Energy Agency (IAEA)
- International Bank for Reconstruction and Development (IBRD)
- International Chamber of Commerce (ICC)
- International Civil Aviation Organization (ICAO)
- International Criminal Court (ICCt)
- International Criminal Police Organization (Interpol)
- International Development Association (IDA)
- International Federation of Red Cross and Red Crescent Societies (IFRCS)
- International Finance Corporation (IFC)
- International Fund for Agricultural Development (IFAD)
- International Hydrographic Organization (IHO)
- International Labour Organization (ILO)
- International Maritime Organization (IMO)
- International Mobile Satellite Organization (IMSO)
- International Monetary Fund (IMF)
- International Bamboo and Rattan Organisation (INBAR)
- International Olympic Committee (IOC)
- International Organization for Migration (IOM)
- International Organization for Standardization (ISO)
- International Red Cross and Red Crescent Movement (ICRM)
- International Telecommunication Union (ITU)
- International Telecommunications Satellite Organization (ITSO)
- International Trade Union Confederation (ITUC)
- Inter-Parliamentary Union (IPU)
- Latin American Economic System (LAES)
- Latin American Integration Association (LAIA)
- Multilateral Investment Guarantee Agency (MIGA)
- Nuclear Suppliers Group (NSG)
- Organisation for the Prohibition of Chemical Weapons (OPCW)
- Organization of American States (OAS)
- Permanent Court of Arbitration (PCA)
- Rio Group (RG)
- Southern Cone Common Market (Mercosur)
- International Institute for the Unification of Private Law (UNIDROIT)
- Unión Latina (observer)
- United Nations (UN)
- Union of South American Nations (UNASUR)
- United Nations Conference on Trade and Development (UNCTAD)
- United Nations Educational, Scientific, and Cultural Organization (UNESCO)
- United Nations High Commissioner for Refugees (UNHCR)
- United Nations Industrial Development Organization (UNIDO)
- United Nations Mission for the Referendum in Western Sahara (MINURSO)
- United Nations Peacekeeping Force in Cyprus (UNFICYP)
- United Nations Stabilization Mission in Haiti (MINUSTAH)
- United Nations Truce Supervision Organization (UNTSO)
- Universal Postal Union (UPU)
- World Confederation of Labour (WCL)
- World Customs Organization (WCO)
- World Federation of Trade Unions (WFTU)
- World Health Organization (WHO) [WITHDRAW]
- World Intellectual Property Organization (WIPO)
- World Meteorological Organization (WMO)
- World Tourism Organization (UNWTO)
- World Trade Organization (WTO)
- Zangger Committee (ZC)

=== Law and order in Argentina ===
Law of Argentina

- Constitution of Argentina
- Crime in Argentina
- Human rights in Argentina
  - LGBT rights in Argentina
  - Women in Argentina
  - Intersex rights in Argentina
- Law enforcement in Argentina
  - National law enforcement agencies
    - Argentine Federal Police
    - Argentine National Gendarmerie
    - Argentine Naval Prefecture
    - Airport Security Police
    - Federal Penitentiary Service
  - Regional law enforcement agencies
    - Buenos Aires Provincial Police
    - Santa Fe Province Police
    - Córdoba Province Police
    - Tucumán Province Police

=== Military of Argentina ===
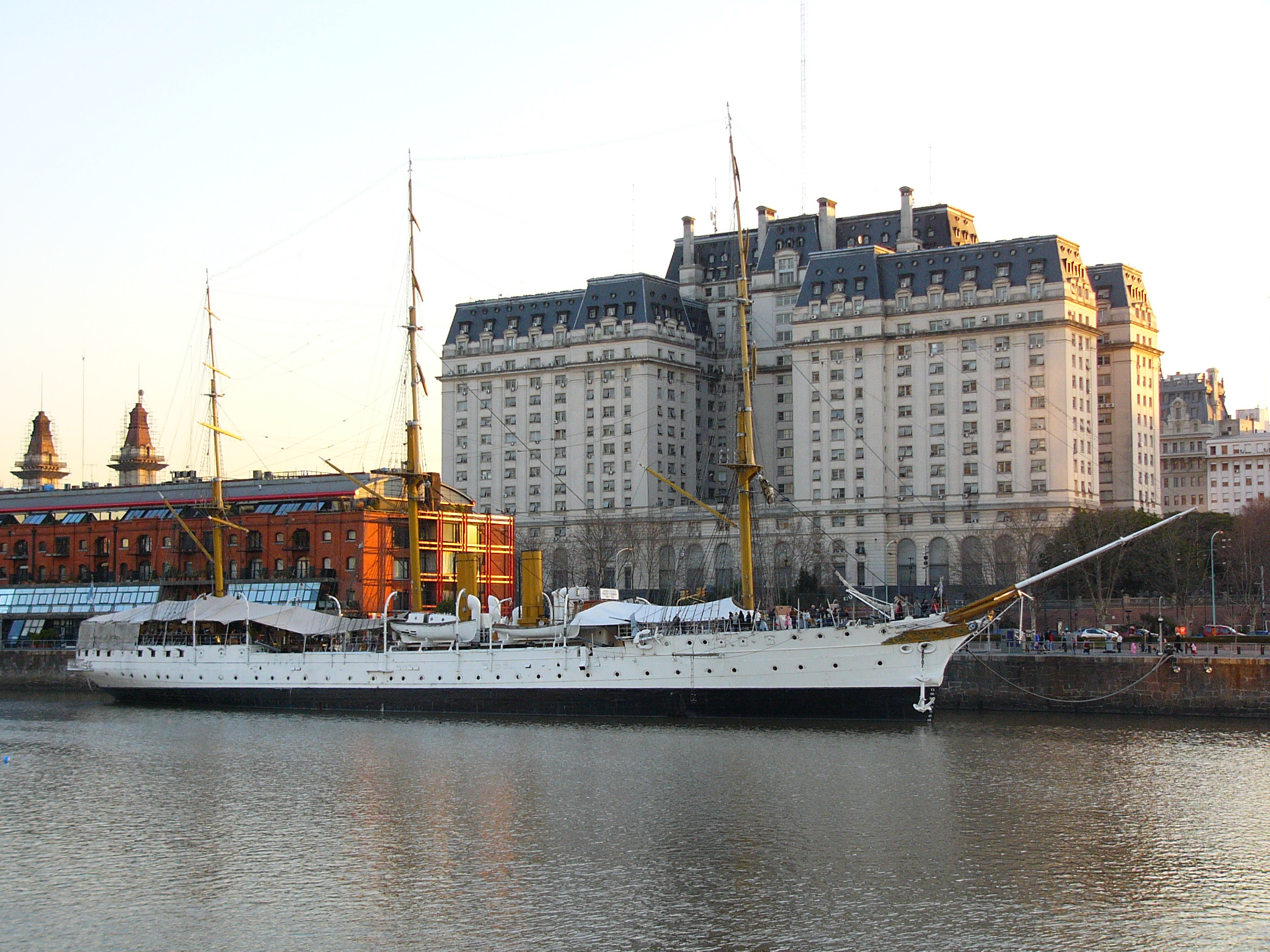
The Libertador Building, seat of the Argentine Defense Ministry

Armed Forces of the Argentine Republic

- Command
  - Commander-in-chief: President of Argentina, Javier Milei
    - Ministry of Defense (Argentina)
- Forces
  - Argentine Army
    - Argentine Army Aviation
  - Argentine Air Force
    - Agrupación Aérea Presidencial
    - Argentine Air Force Mobile Field Hospital
  - Argentine Navy
    - Argentine Naval Aviation
    - Argentine Marines
- Military history of Argentina
- Military ranks of Argentina
- White Helmets Commission

== History of Argentina ==
=== History of Argentina, by period ===
- May Revolution

=== History of Argentina, by region ===
- History of Buenos Aires
  - Timeline of Buenos Aires history

=== History of Argentina, by subject ===
- Economic history of Argentina
- Military history of Argentina
- LGBT history in Argentina

== Culture of Argentina ==
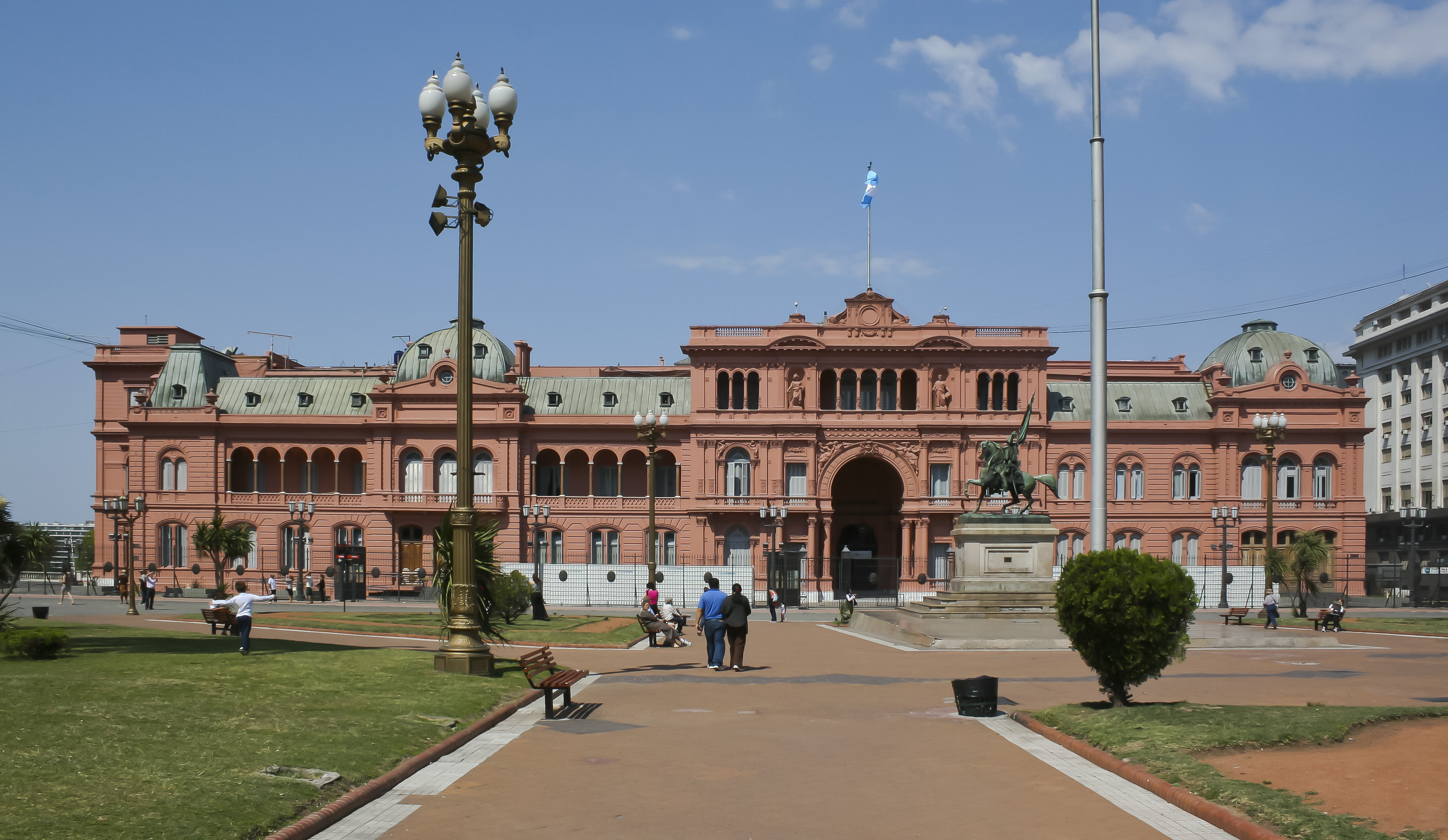
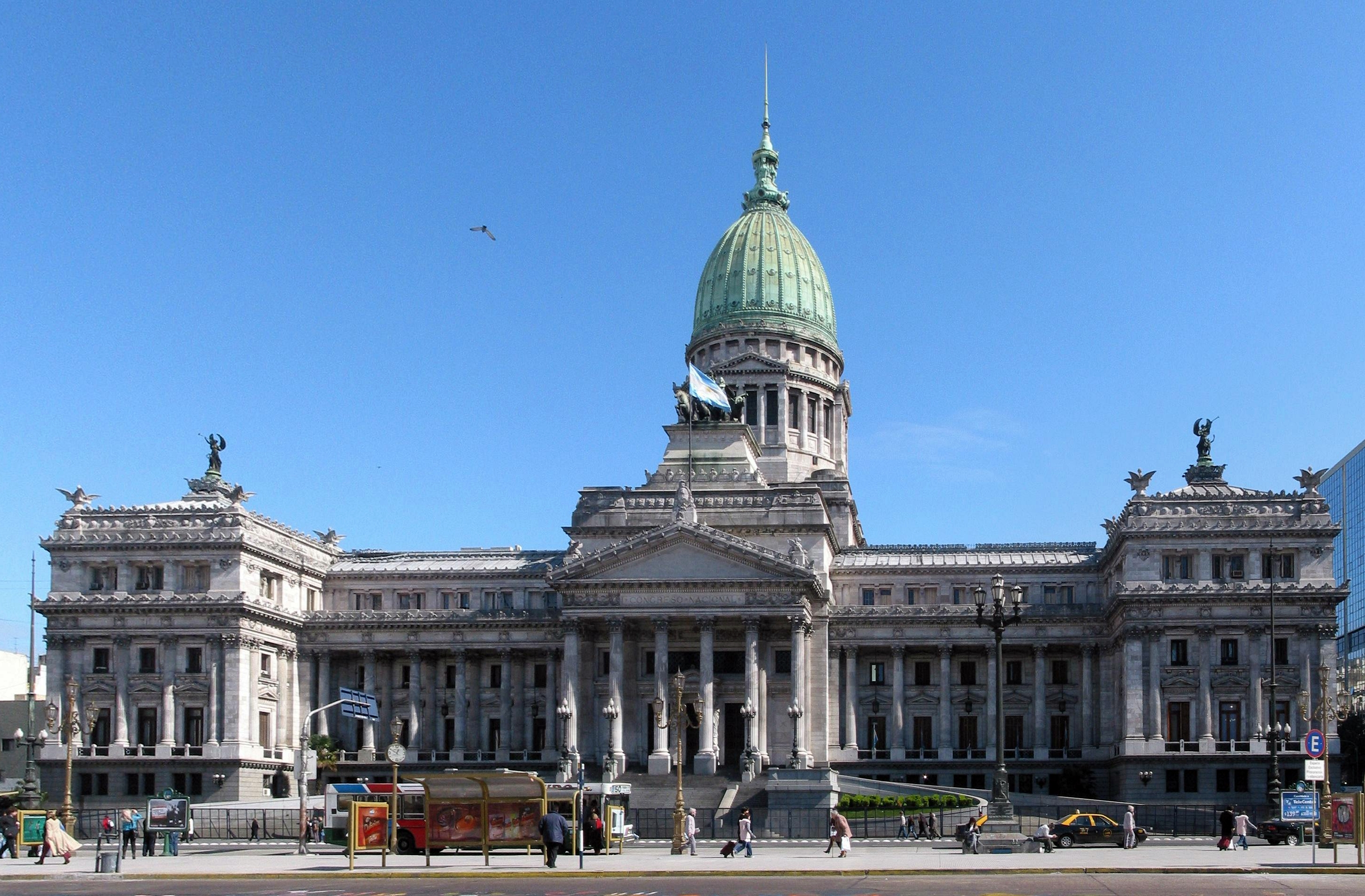
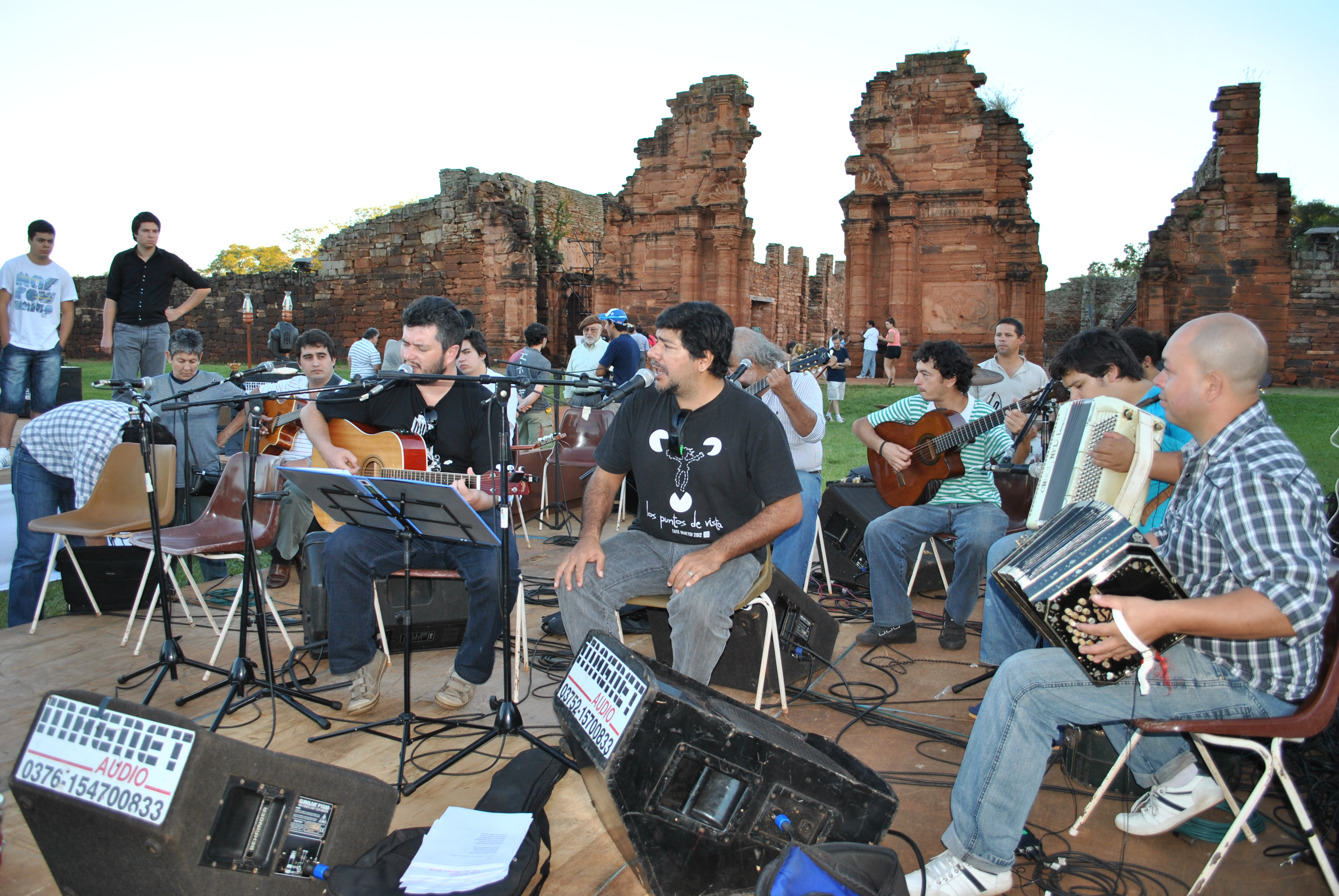
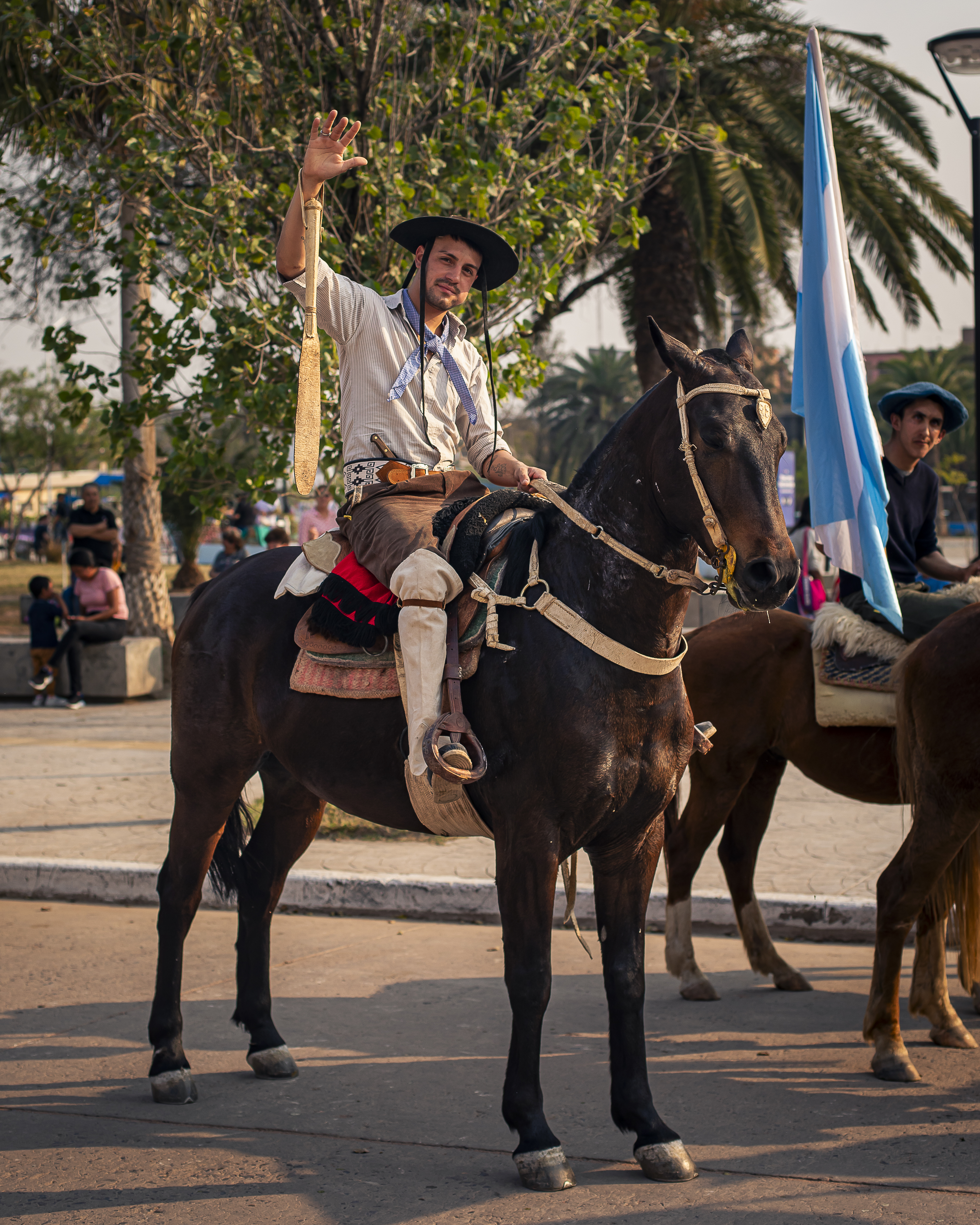
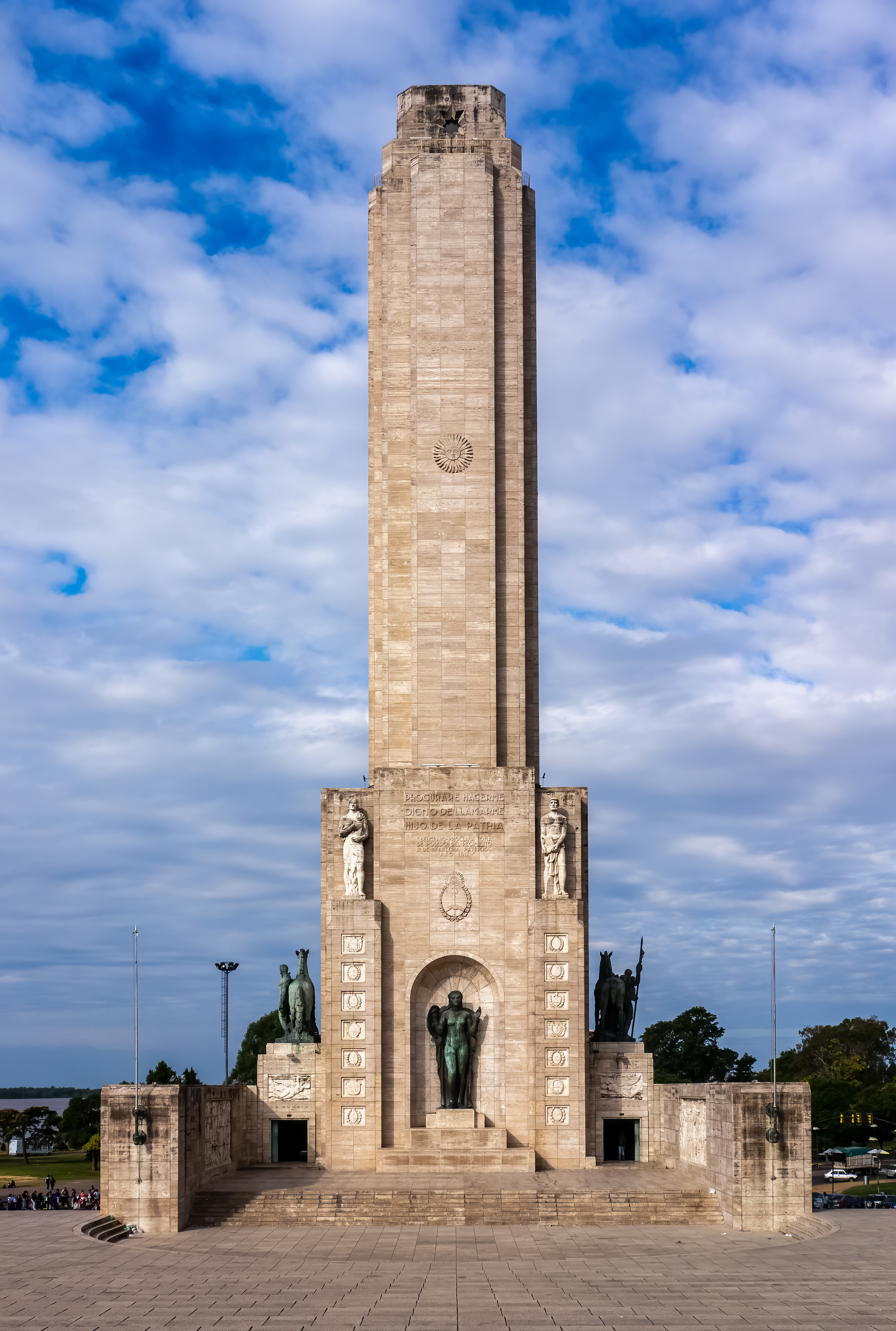
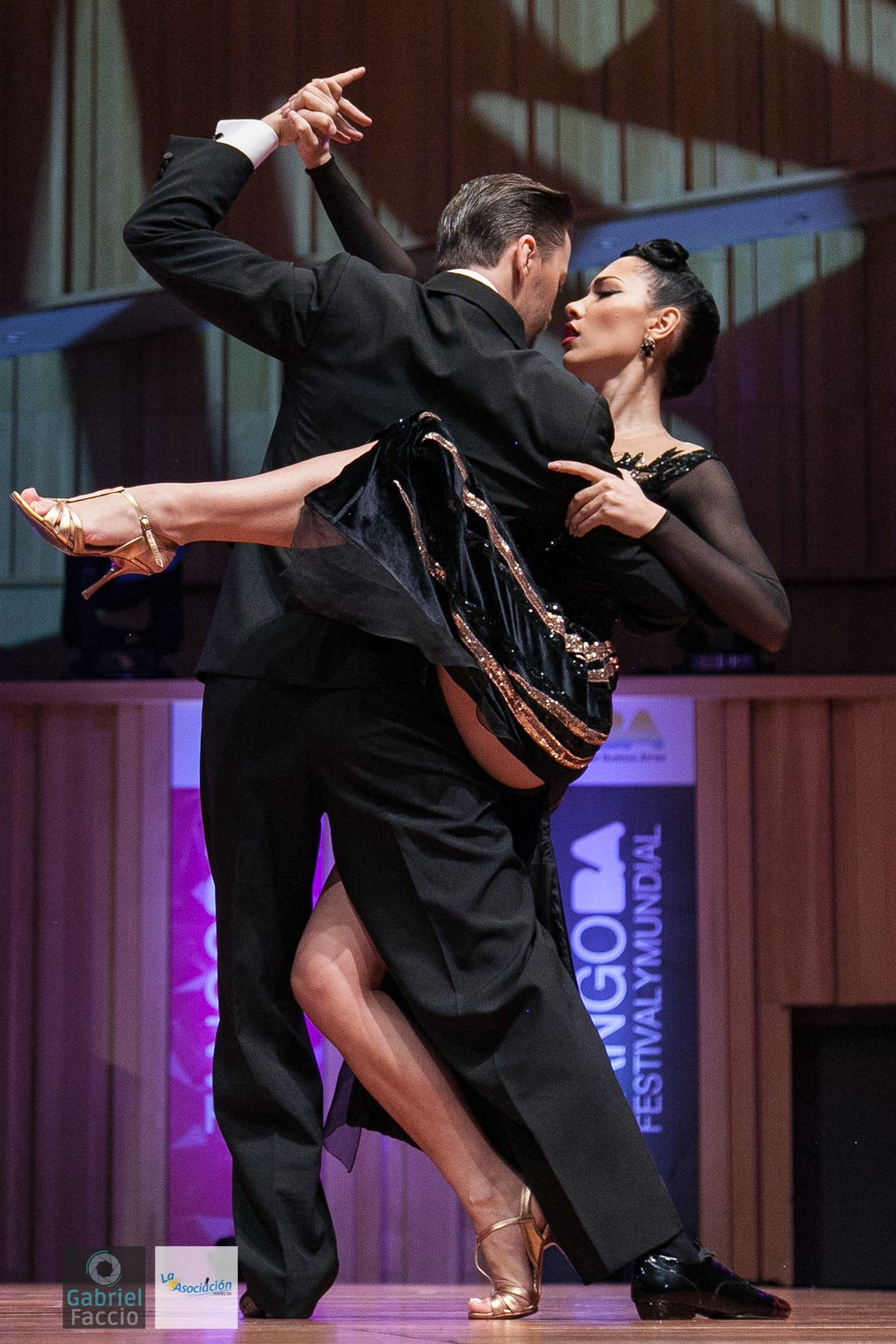
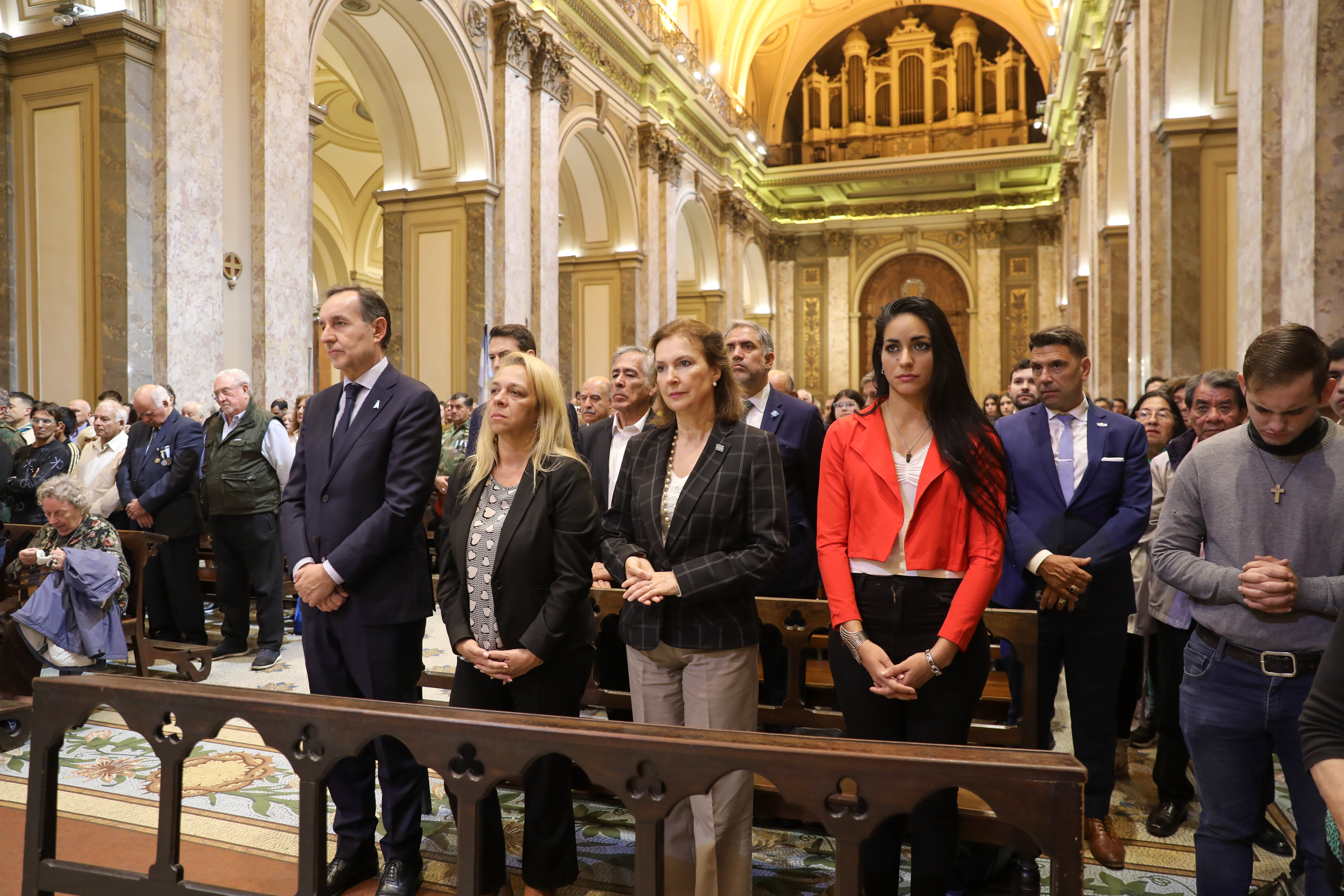
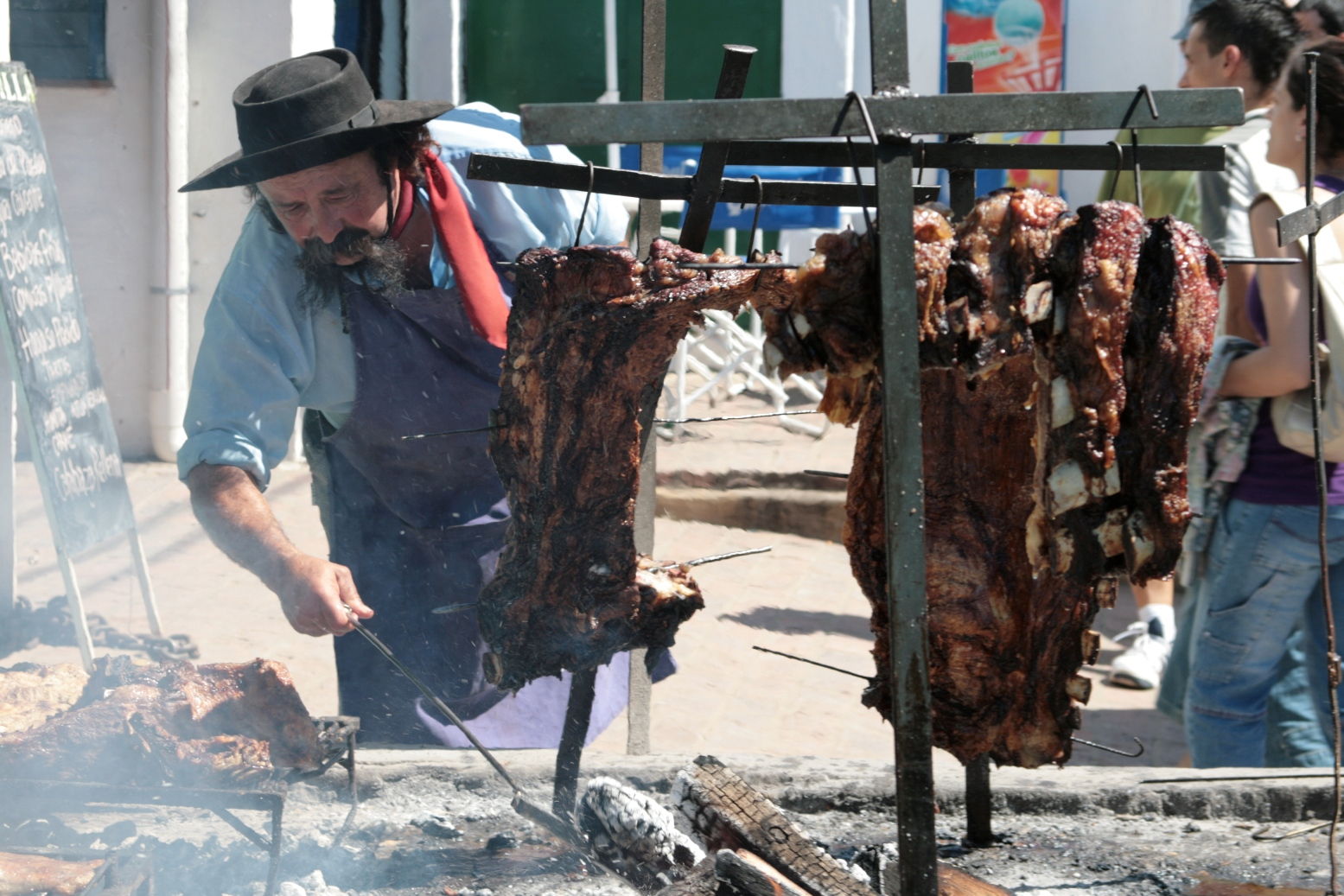
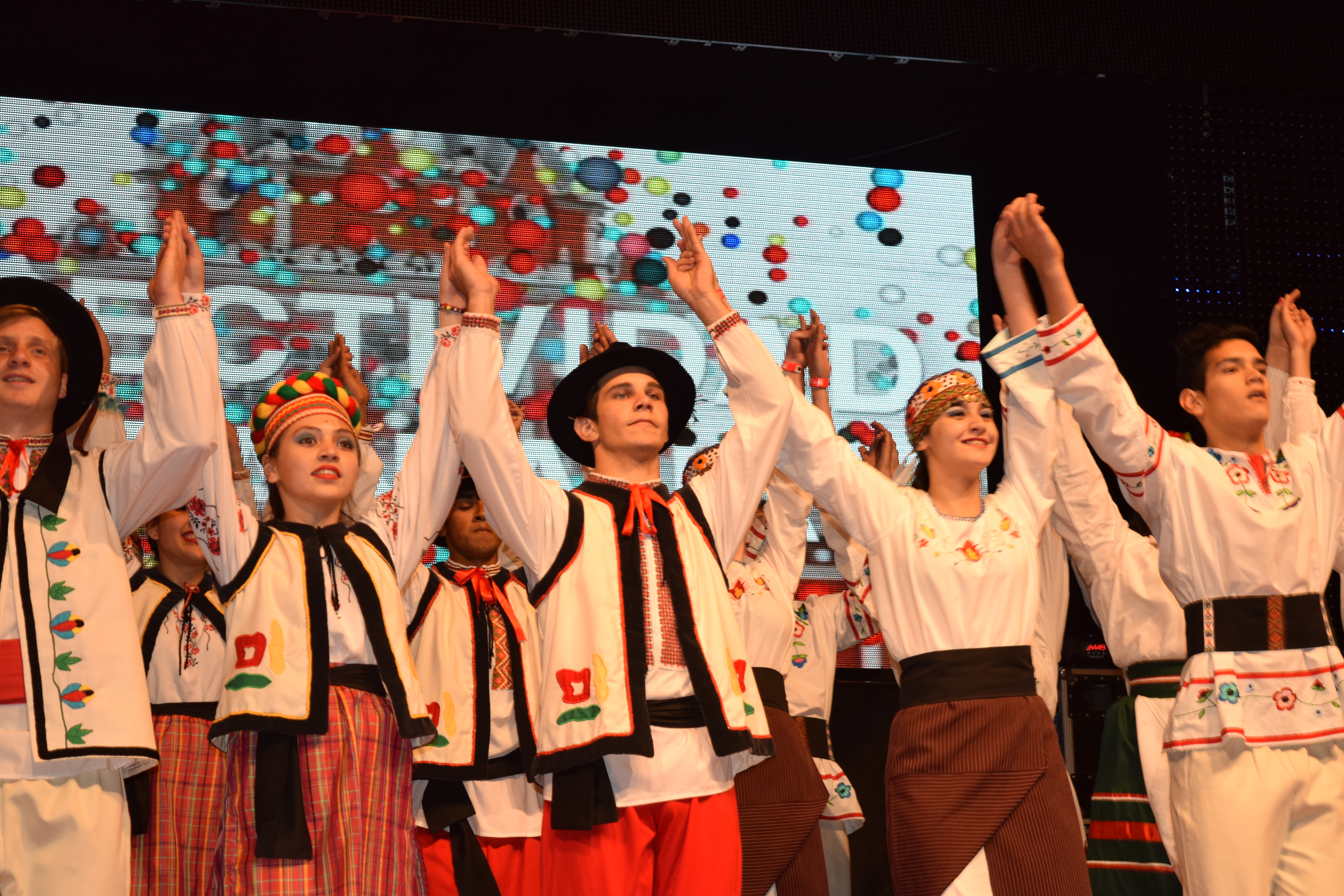
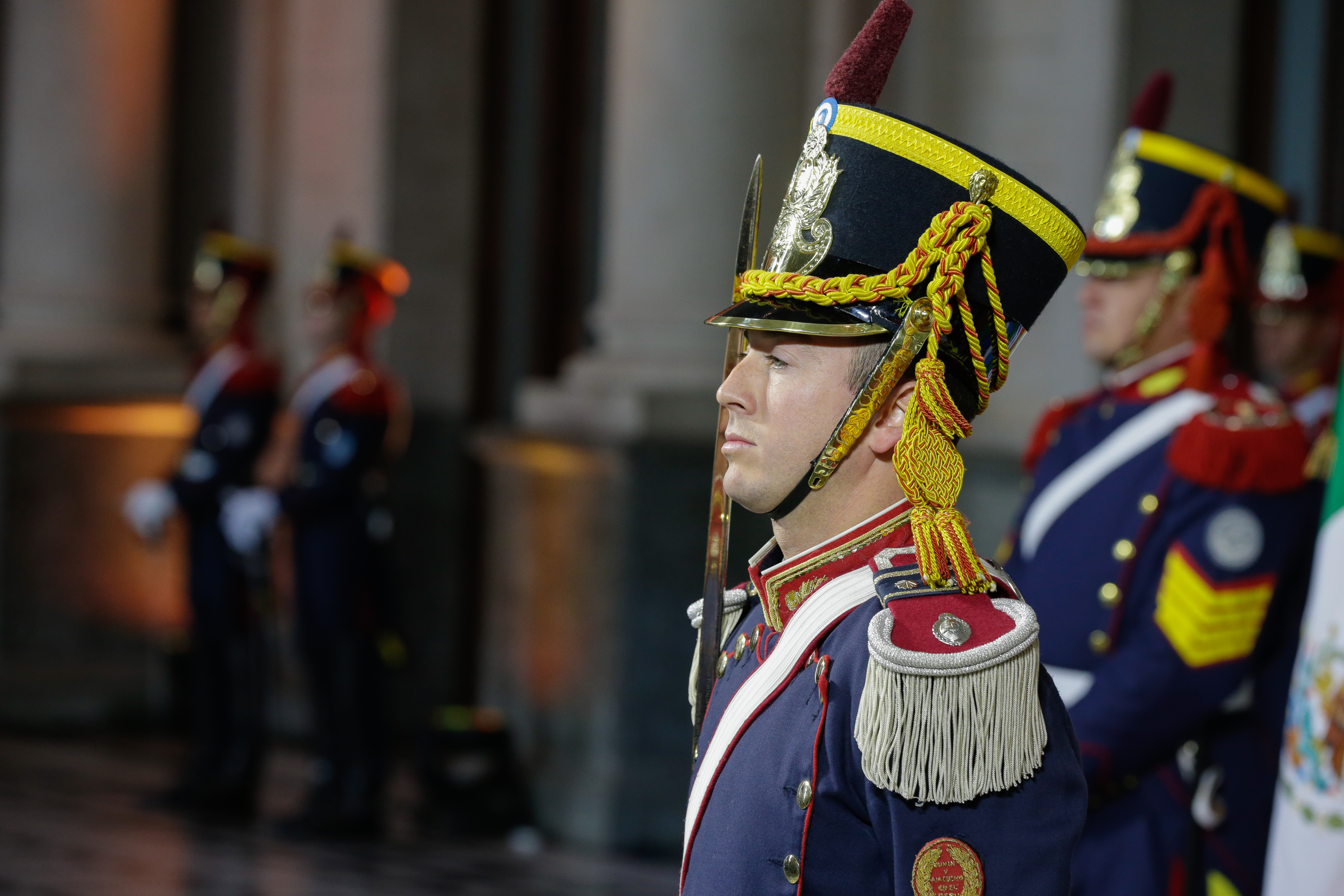
From top, left to right: Casa Rosada, Palace of the Argentine National Congress, Chamamé in San Ignacio Miní, Gaucho, National Flag Memorial, Tango, Catholic Mass, Asado, Immigrant's Festival and Mounted Grenadiers.
- Architecture of Argentina
- Cuisine of Argentina
- Humor in Argentina
- Languages of Argentina
- Media in Argentina
- National symbols of Argentina
  - Coat of arms of Argentina
  - Flag of Argentina
  - National anthem of Argentina
- People of Argentina
- Public holidays in Argentina
- Religion in Argentina
  - Buddhism in Argentina
  - Christianity in Argentina
  - Hinduism in Argentina
  - Islam in Argentina
  - Judaism in Argentina
- World Heritage Sites in Argentina

=== Art in Argentina ===
- Cinema of Argentina
- Literature of Argentina
- Music of Argentina
  - List of music artists and bands from Argentina
- Television in Argentina
- Theatre in Argentina

=== Sports in Argentina ===
Sports in Argentina

- Argentina at the Olympics
- Basketball in Argentina
- Rugby union in Argentina
- Cricket in Argentina
- Football in Argentina

== Economy and infrastructure of Argentina ==
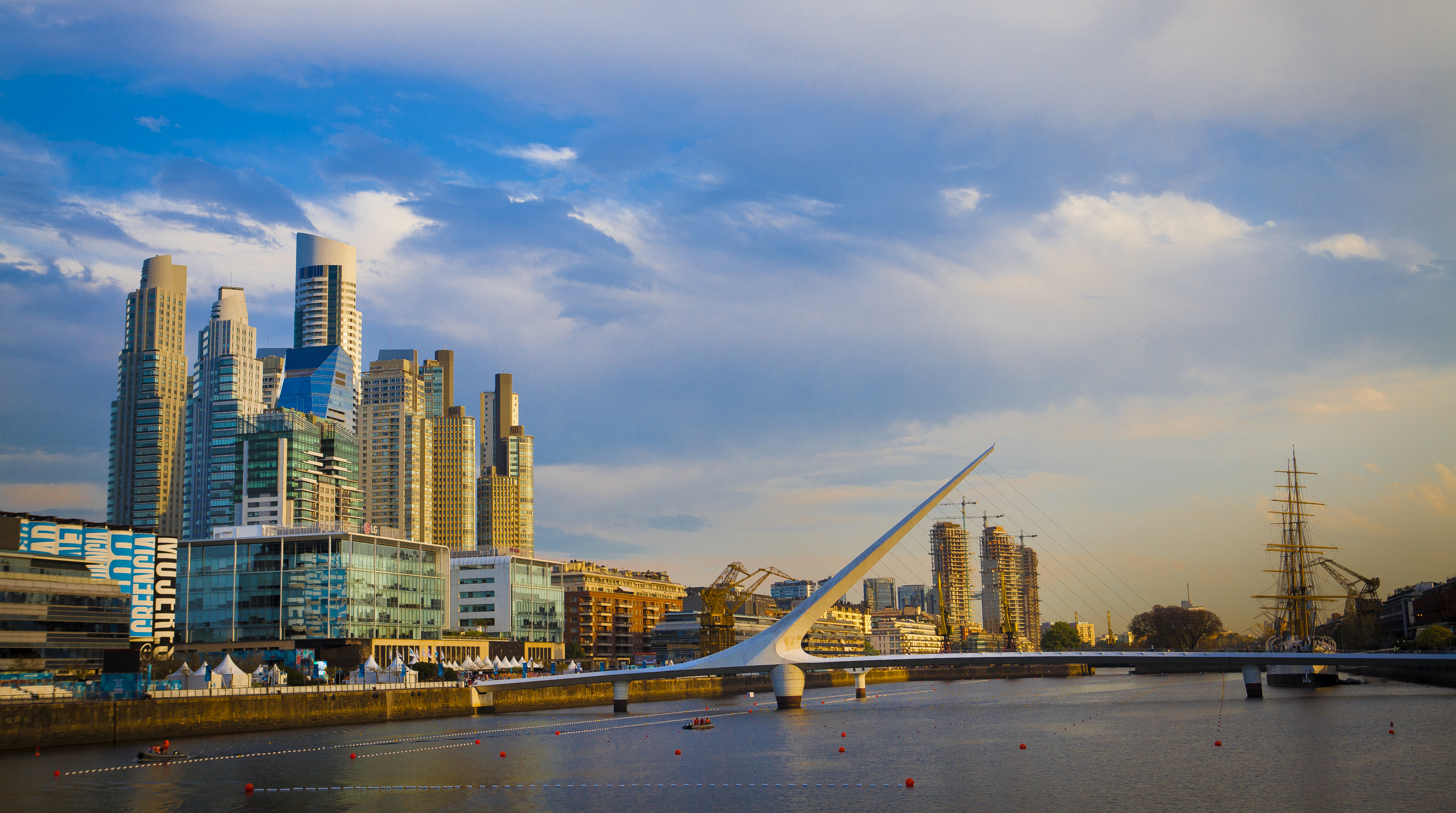
The Puerto Madero business complex in Buenos Aires CBD

- Economic rank, by nominal GDP (2007): 31st (thirty-first)
- Agriculture in Argentina
- Banking in Argentina
- Communications in Argentina
  - Internet in Argentina
    - .ar Internet country code top-level domain for Argentina
- Companies of Argentina
- Currency of Argentina: Peso
  - ISO 4217: ARS
- Economic history of Argentina
- Energy in Argentina
  - Energy in Argentina
- Health care in Argentina
- Mining in Argentina
- Argentina Stock Exchange
- Tourism in Argentina
- Visa policy of Argentina
- Transport in Argentina
  - Airports in Argentina
  - Rail transport in Argentina
  - Roads in Argentina
  - Colectivo
- Water supply and sanitation in Argentina

== Education in Argentina ==
- List of schools in Argentina
- Roman Catholic seminaries in Argentina
- Academic ranks in Argentina
- List of universities in Argentina
  - Agricultural universities and colleges in Argentina

== See also ==
- List of international rankings
- Member state of the Group of Twenty Finance Ministers and Central Bank Governors
- Member state of the United Nations
- Outline of geography
- Outline of South America
