= Nyx (disambiguation) =

Nyx is the personification of the night in Greek mythology.

Nyx or NYX may refer to:

== Astronomy ==
- 3908 Nyx, an Amor and Mars-crosser asteroid

== Fictional characters and series ==
=== Film and television ===
- Nyx (Once Upon a Time in Wonderland), the guardian of the well in the U.S. TV series
- Nyx, a character in Dark Matter (TV series)
- Nyx, a scout fairy in the film Tinker Bell and the Legend of the Neverbeast
- Nyx Ulric, the protagonist in the film Kingsglaive: Final Fantasy XV

=== Comic books ===
- NYX (2003 series), the first volume of the American comic book series by Marvel Comics released between 2003 and 2005
- NYX (2024 series), the second volume of the American comic book series by Marvel Comics which began in 2024
- Nyx (Marvel Comics), the supervillain of the Avengers: No Road Home comic book series
- Nyx (Image Comics), a character of the Spawn comic book series

=== Video games ===
- Nyx, a character in the videogame Dota 2
- Nyx, a character in the videogame Quake Champions
- Nyx, a character in the Queen's Blade gamebook series
- Nyx, a character in the video game Persona 3

== Music ==
- Nyx (composition), an orchestral composition by Esa-Pekka Salonen
- Nyx, by Mary Finsterer

== Other uses ==
- Nyx (moth), a moth genus
- Nyx (prototype), an experimental prototype for the Amiga computer platform's AAA chipset
- The Exploration Company Nyx, a European spacecapsule for cargo and eventual astronaut use
- NyxQuest: Kindred Spirits, A 2D-3D hybrid video game for WiiWare by Over the Top Studios
- NYX (gene), a gene encoding the protein Nyctalopin
- NYX, stock symbol for NYSE Euronext (formerly NYSE Group, Inc.), operator of multiple securities exchanges
- NYX Cosmetics, an American cosmetics company owned by L'Oréal

== See also ==
- Nix (disambiguation)
- Nick (disambiguation) for Nicks
- NIC (disambiguation) for NICs
- Nik (disambiguation) for Niks
