= NIQ =

NIQ, Niq, or niq can refer to:

- Niq, a village in northwestern Iran
- Naandi language, a language spoken in Kenya, by ISO 639-3 code
- Niaqornat Heliport, a heliport in Niaqornat village, Greenland
- NielsenIQ, a global marketing research firm based in Chicago, United States
- Niq Mhlongo (born 1973), a South African novelist
- Nigaura railway station, a train station in Anuppur district, Madhya Pradesh, India
- Navigation Instructor Qualification, a teacher qualification in the Volunteer Gliding Squadron within the U.K.'s Royal Air Force

== See also ==
- Nick (disambiguation)
- Uniq (disambiguation)
- NIC (disambiguation)
- NIK (disambiguation)
- 'Nique (disambiguation)
