= Military history of Latin America =

The military history of Latin America includes:

- Military history of Argentina
- Military history of Bolivia
- Military history of Brazil
- Military history of Chile
- Military history of Colombia
- Military history of Costa Rica
- Military history of Cuba
- Military history of the Dominican Republic
- Military history of Ecuador
- Military history of El Salvador
- Military history of Guatemala
- Military history of Honduras
- Military history of Mexico
- Military history of Nicaragua
- Military history of Panama
- Military history of Paraguay
- Military history of Peru
- Military history of Puerto Rico
- Military history of Uruguay
- Military history of Venezuela
