= Nixe =

Nixe may refer to:

- Nixe (water spirit), in Germanic mythology
- Nixe (mayfly), a genus of insects
- SMS Nixe, a German ship
- Operation Nixe, a military operation during World War II

== See also ==
- Nix (disambiguation)
- Nyx (disambiguation)
- Nixi (disambiguation)
- Nixie (disambiguation)
