= Phormoestes =

Scientific classification
- Kingdom: Animalia
- Phylum: Arthropoda
- Clade: Pancrustacea
- Class: Insecta
- Order: Lepidoptera
- Family: Millieriidae
- Genus: Phormoestes; Heppner, 1982
- Species: P. palmettovora

Binomial name
- Phormoestes palmettovora Heppner, 1982

Genus of moths

Phormoestes is a genus of moths in the family choreutidae (sub-family Millieriidae), containing only one species, Phormoestes palmettovora, which is known from Florida, United States. This genus exhibits distinctive morphology, which sets it apart from other genera within the family, such as Milleria.

== Etymology ==
Phormoestes is derived from Greek, where 'phormo-' means 'basket' and '-estes' means dweller. The name refers to the pupal stage of the species, which resembles a basket.

== Description ==
=== Head ===
The head region features a smooth vertex and frons. On the mouth part, the basal and middle segments of the smooth-scaled labial palpus are subequal, but the apical segment is shorter. The haustellum (base of tongue) is scaled and its maxillary palpus may have a singular or a pair of segments, each with a broad base and rounded ends. Medium-sized eyes are present with a third simple eye (ocellus) and large pilifier. The antennae are flat and covered with dense hair including a tentorial bridge, a structure supporting openings near joints.

=== Forewing ===
Phormoestes moths are small; their forewing length ranges from 3.2- 4.0 mm. Their forewings conformation is somewhat pointed at the apex, rounded tornal and anal margins.

=== Hindwing ===
Hindwings are subtriangular with a rounded but slightly truncate anal margin and a somewhat pointed apex.

=== Abdomen ===
The abdomen is normal, coremata (inflatable sacs at apex) are absent.

=== Male genitalia ===
In males, the abdominal segments tegumen (dorsal) and vinculum (ventral) are fused together. They support a small, articulated structure called saccus, along with a sclerotized (hardened) uncus is present, which helps in clasping female during copulation. The socius is absent.

Support structures include gnathos, a hardened point with strong side extensions, and the anellus, a round and curved ring- like structure without side extensions. The valvae, which are lateral clasping organs, are simple. The inseminating organ, aedeagus, is small and slender with absence of cornutus (which also plays key role in transferring spermatophores).

=== Female genitalia ===
The genitalia constitute of a normal ovipositor, and setaceous papilla analis, the sensory structures near the hind orifice. Sterigma is absent in apophyses and ostium, which provide attachment and support during copulation and egg-laying. The ductus bursae, a tube where sperm is released from capsule, is membranous. The spermatophore receptacle of female, corpus bursae, lacks the sperm-storage sac called signum.

=== Larval morphology and traits ===
The larva has a hypognathos head, with the frontoclypeus extending halfway upto the epicranial notch. Prolegs are equipped with hooks and spines in biordinal orientation. The simple eyes, stemmata, are arranged in a rectangular semi-circle, and serve basic light detection purposes. The first segment of the thorax, the prothorax, bears sclerotized dorsal plates, which aid in its structure. Various thoracic and abdominal segments exhibit different setae arrangements and pinacula formations.

=== Pupal morphology and traits ===
The larvae feed on Sabal palmetto. They have been found boring within the minute flower pods of the inflorescence of the host plant. After sufficient feeding, pupation takes place in a hollow flower pod with a flap-like opening attached to host leaf. The pupa has blunt projection on the head front, prominent maxillary palpi and free legs at the wing tips. Dorsal abdomen spines are arranged bilinearly. It appears that larvae or pupae overwinter in the pupal case and adults of the first generation emerge the following March, when the palms are again producing inflorescences.
