= Nyx puyaphaga =

Scientific classification
- Kingdom: Animalia
- Phylum: Arthropoda
- Clade: Pancrustacea
- Class: Insecta
- Order: Lepidoptera
- Family: Millieriidae
- Genus: Nyx
- Species: N. puyaphaga

Binomial name
- Nyx puyaphaga Heppner, 1982

Species of moth

Nyx puyaphaga is a moth of the family Choreutidae. It is known from central Chile.

The length of the forewings is 3.8-4.5 mm. Adults are on wing from November to December.

The larvae feed on Puya alpestris.
