= Nyx viscachensis =

Scientific classification
- Kingdom: Animalia
- Phylum: Arthropoda
- Class: Insecta
- Order: Lepidoptera
- Family: Millieriidae
- Genus: Nyx
- Species: N. viscachensis

Binomial name
- Nyx viscachensis Beeche, 1998

Species of moth

Nyx viscachensis is a moth of the family Choreutidae. It is known from Chile at elevations between 1,400 and 1,700 meters.

The larvae feed on Puya coerulea.
