= Nixie =

Nixie may refer to:

- Nixie (folklore), a water spirit in Germanic mythology and folk tales
- Nixie tube, a gas-filled electron tube once in use as an alphanumeric display
- Melusine or Nixie, a mythical feminine spirit of fresh waters in sacred springs and rivers
- Nixie (Dungeons & Dragons), a creature from Dungeons & Dragons
- AN/SLQ-25 Nixie, a torpedo decoy
- Nixie (postal), a piece of undeliverable mail, or the postal marking on such a piece of mail
- Nixie, one of the three main mermaids in the first season of Mako: Island of Secrets
- Nixie (drone), a wearable camera-equipped drone

== See also ==
- Nixi (disambiguation)
- Nixe (disambiguation)
