= Nixi (disambiguation) =

Nixi may refer to:

- National Internet Exchange of India (NIXI)
- Nixi chicken, a breed of chicken from Yunnan, China
- Di nixi, childbirth deities in ancient Rome
- Nixi, one of the names for Neck (water spirit)

== See also ==
- Nixie (disambiguation)
- Nixe (disambiguation)
