= Islote Blanco =

- Location within Argentina

Geography
- Location: Beagle Channel
- Coordinates: 55°3′41″S 66°32′49″W

Administration
- Argentina

Islote Blanco is a small uninhabited island belonging to the Ushuaia Department of the Tierra del Fuego in Argentina. It is located in the Beagle Channel, very close to its mouth in the Atlantic Ocean. It has an area of about 1 hectare. Some authors consider this island as the southernmost point of the territory with uncontested sovereignty of Argentina.

== See also ==
- List of extreme points of Argentina
