= Old Nick =

Old Nick may refer to:

- The devil in Christian tradition
- Niccolò Machiavelli
- Old Nick (beer), from Young's Brewery
- Old Nick Company, a student theatre company at the University of Tasmania, Australia
- Swansea Devil, a wood carving of the Devil in Swansea, Wales
- A pseudonym used by British vocalist Nick Holmes

== See also ==
- Nick (disambiguation)
