= Millieria =

- Millieria dolosalis

Scientific classification
- Kingdom: Animalia
- Phylum: Arthropoda
- Clade: Pancrustacea
- Class: Insecta
- Order: Lepidoptera
- Family: Millieriidae
- Genus: Millieria; Ragonot, 1874
- Species: M. dolosana

Binomial name
- Millieria dolosana (Herrich-Schaffer, 1854)

Synonyms
- Genus: Ripismia Wocke, [1876]; Rhipismia Reutti, 1898; Milliereia Spuler, 1910; Milliera Le Marchand, 1937; Millieroa Le Marchand, 1937; Species: Choreutis dolosalis Heydenreich, 1851 [nomen nudum]; Choreutis dolosana Herrich-Schaffer, 1854

Genus of moths

Millieria is a genus of moths in the family Choreutidae, containing only one species, Millieria dolosana, which is found from Morocco north to Germany, France and Poland, east to southern Russia and Israel.

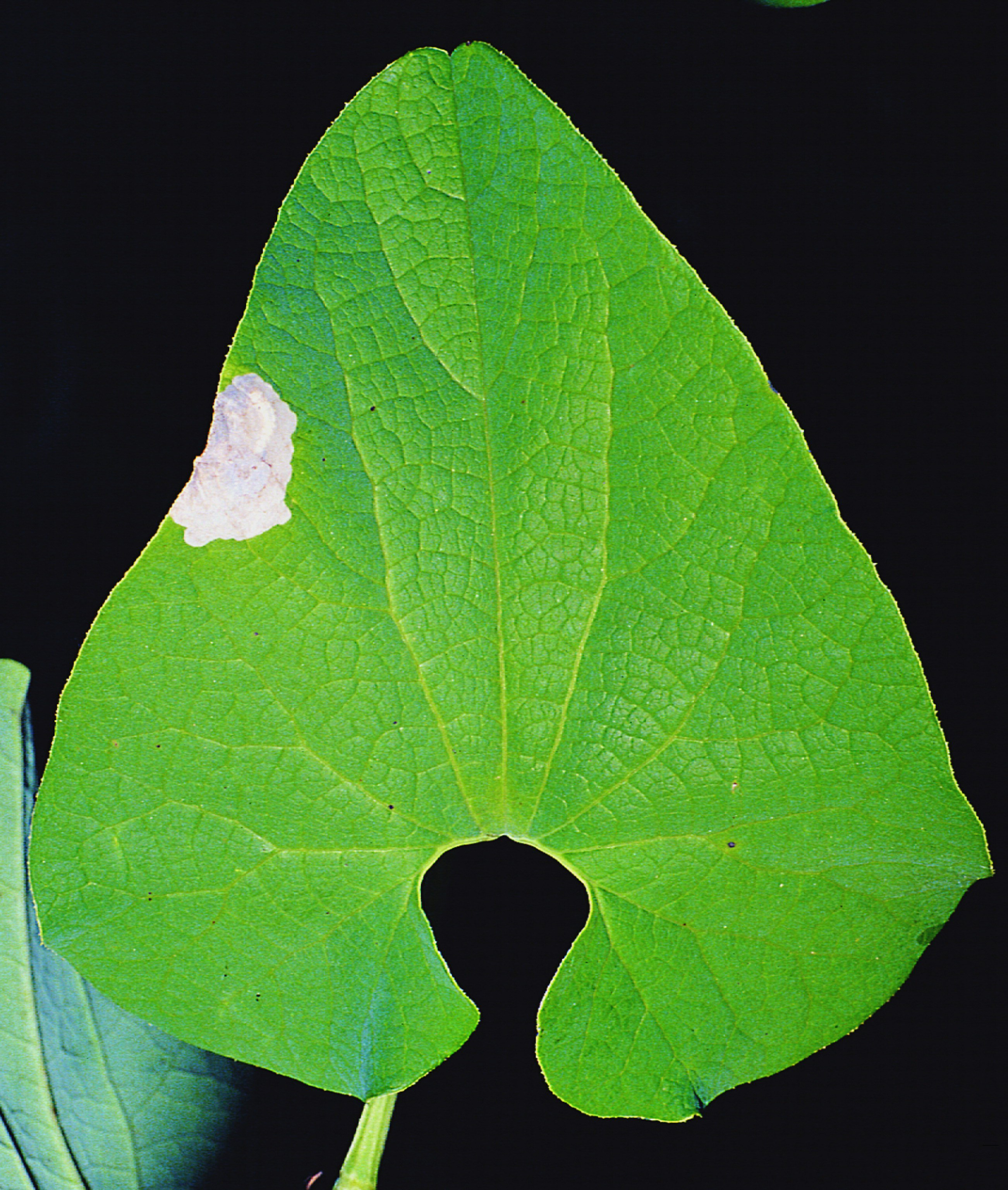
Damage

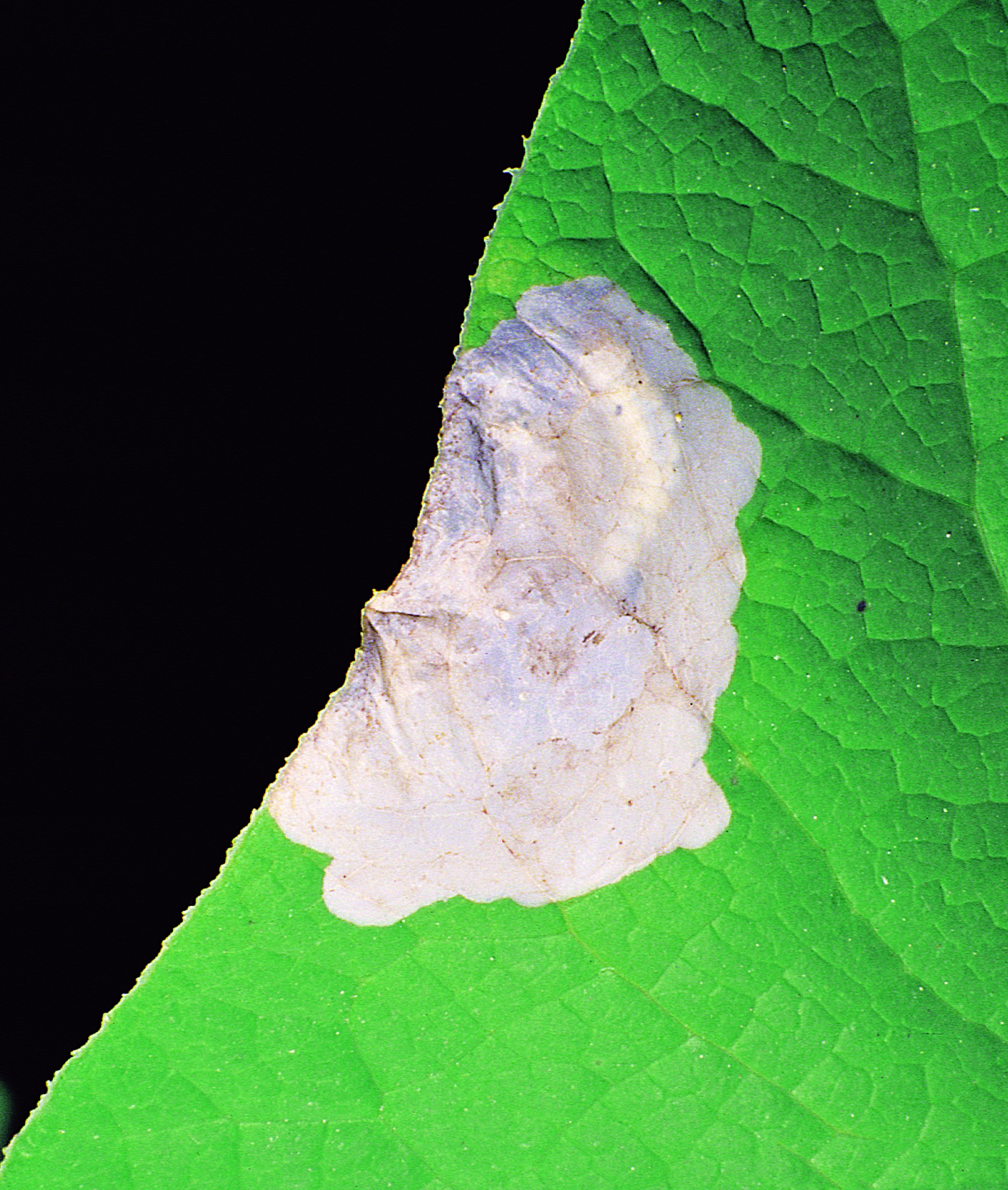
Close-up of damage

The length of the forewings is 4.0-4.8 mm. Adults are on wing from March to December in the south and from April to November in the north. There are at least two generations per year in the north.

The larvae feed on Aristolochia clematitis, Aristolochia macrophylla and Aristolochia pistolochia. They are gregarious leaf miners and make irregular blotchlike mines on the dorsal surface of the leaves, with several larvae occupying one leaf mine. The mine is a large, blackish, full depth blotch at the leaf margin. There is no initial corridor. The frass is deposited in grains, scattered through the mine. Pupation takes place within a lentil-shaped pupal case formed within the leaf mine.
