= Nix =

Nix or NIX may refer to:

== Places ==
- Nix, Alabama, an unincorporated community, United States
- Nix, Texas, a ghost town in southwestern Lampasas County, Texas, United States
- Nix (moon), a moon of Pluto

== In science and technology ==
- Nix (gene), a pro-apoptotic gene
- Norwegian Internet Exchange (NIX), an Internet exchange point in Oslo
- Neutral Internet Exchange of the Czech Republic, the Internet exchange point in Prague
- Nix (package manager), a package and configuration manager for computer systems
  - NixOS, a Linux distribution based on the package manager
- NIX, a derivative or fork of Plan 9 from Bell Labs
- Unix-like, abbreviated *nix or nix

== Codes ==
- Nioro Airport, Mali (IATA airport code: NIX)
- Hema language, (ISO 639-3 code: nix)

== Other uses ==
- Nix Federal Building, a historic building in Philadelphia, Pennsylvania
- Nix Professional Building, a hospital in San Antonio, Texas
- Permethrin, branded as Nix in North America, an anti-lice drug
- The Nix, a 2016 novel by Nathan Hill
- Neck (water spirit) or nix, an aquatic being in Germanic folklore
- Nix (surname), listing people with the surname
- "Nix", a song by Golden Boy with Miss Kittin from Or

== See also ==
- Nyx (disambiguation)
- Nixe (disambiguation)
- Nick (disambiguation)
- NIC (disambiguation)
- New York Knicks, basketball team
