= Nix (surname) =

Nix/Nykke impaled.

Nix (or Nicks) is a surname of British and Irish origins, which initially indicated that the person so named was the child of a person named Nicholas, traditionally shortened to "Nick". It is therefore closely related to Nixon and Nickson, which are derived from "Nick's son", and also related to Nicholl and Nicholson, derived from another variation of Nicholas.

Nix, also spelled Nicks, has recorded English and Irish derivations. In English surname accounts, it derives from Nick, a shortened form of the personal name Nicholas. Other Nicholas-derived surnames include Nixon and Nickson, formed from “Nick’s son”, and Nicholl and Nicholson, formed from another version of the same personal name.

An Irish derivation is documented by Patrick Woulfe in Irish Names and Surnames (1923). Woulfe records Nix as an anglicised form of Mac Niocais, meaning “son of Nicholas”. He describes it as a patronymic adopted by a branch of the Woulfe family in counties Limerick and Clare, and lists Woulfe alongside Nix in the entry.

Nix arms Norwich cathedral c 1501.

Woulfe distinguishes this entry from Mac Niocláis, another patronymic meaning “son of Nicholas”. He identifies the latter as a County Mayo surname and gives its anglicised forms as MacNicholas and Nixon, also listing Clausson and Classon. His account therefore records both a regional Irish use of Nix and a separate Nicholas-derived surname tradition associated with Mayo.

== Notable people surnamed "Nix" ==
=== Entertainment ===
- Bern Nix (1947–2017), an American jazz guitarist
- Cranford Nix (1969–2002), an American guitarist, singer, and songwriter
- Don Nix (1941–2024), an American songwriter, composer, arranger, musician, and author
- Garth Nix (born 1963), an Australian writer who specializes in children's and young adult fantasy novels
- Lori Nix (born 1969), a photographer and printer based in Brooklyn, New York
- Martha Nix Wade (born 1967), an American actress sometimes credited as "Martha Nix"
- Rosie Nix Adams (1958–2003), an American singer-songwriter born "Rosie Nix"
- Wendi Nix (born 1974), an American anchor and sports reporter for ESPN
- Willie Nix (died 1991), Blues drummer active in Memphis, Tennessee in the 1940s and 1950s
- The Nix brothers (Evan, born 1983, and Adam, born 1986), American film directors, producers, and musicians

=== Law and politics ===
- Evett Dumas Nix (1861–1946), a United States Marshal in the late 19th century handling the jurisdiction that included the wild Oklahoma Territory
- J. Kelly Nix (born 1934), Louisiana politician and businessman
- Kirksey M. Nix, Oklahoma judge and politician
- Randy Nix (born 1956), a Republican member of the Georgia House of Representatives
- Robert N. C. Nix Sr. (1898–1987), the first African American to represent Pennsylvania in the House of Representatives
- Robert N. C. Nix Jr., a Justice of the Pennsylvania Supreme Court from 1984 to 1996
- Sheila Nix, an American political strategist, most recently serving as Chief of Staff to Jill Biden

=== Sports ===
- Barry Nix, an English football (soccer) defender
- Bo Nix (born 2000), American football player
- Buddy Nix (born 1939), the former General Manager of the Buffalo Bills
- Charles Nix (1873–1956), a British sport shooter who competed at the 1908 Summer Olympics
- Daishen Nix (born 2002), American basketball player
- Derrick Nix (born 1990), American professional basketball player
- Derrick Nix (born 1980), American football player and coach
- Doyle Nix (1933–2009), an American football defensive back
- Dwayne Nix (born 1946), an American football tight end
- Dyron Nix (1967–2013), American professional basketball player
- Emery Nix (1919–2005), an American football quarterback
- Jacob Nix (born 1996), an American amateur baseball player
- Jayson Nix (born 1982), an American professional baseball player
- John Nix (American football) (1976), a former American football defensive lineman
- Kent Nix (born 1944), a former professional American football quarterback
- Kyle Nix (born 1986), an Australian-born English footballer
- Laynce Nix (born 1980), an American professional baseball outfielder
- Louis Nix (1991–2021), an American football nose tackle
- Lucas Nix (born 1989), an American football guard
- Matt Nix (born 1971), an American writer, producer, and director best known for creating Burn Notice
- Morgan Nix (born 1968), an Irish former Gaelic football player
- Patrick Nix (born 1971), an American college football coach and former player
- Peter Nix (born 1958), English footballer, father of Kyle Nix
- Roosevelt Nix (born 1967), American football player
- Sunder Nix (born 1961), a 1984 Summer Olympics gold medalist in the men's 4x400 meter relay
- Tyrone Nix (born 1972), an American defensive coordinator for the Middle Tennessee football team

=== Other ===
- Alexander Nix, former CEO of Cambridge Analytica
- Alison Nix (born 1988), an American fashion model
- James R. Nix, director of the Ellen G. White Estate since 2000
- Kirksey Nix, reputedly the leader of the Dixie Mafia
- Orville Nix (1911–1972), a witness to the assassination of U.S. President John F. Kennedy
- Walter Nix, involved in a McDonald's scam calling dispute

=== Fictional ===
- David Nix, a character in the 2015 Disney film Tomorrowland
- Nix, an evil cult leader portrayed in the movie Lord of Illusions
- Nix, a supporting character in the video game Infamous 2.

== Notable people surnamed Nicks ==
- Catherine Nicks (died 1709), English businessperson
- Hakeem Nicks (born 1988), American football wide receiver
- John Nicks (born 1929), figure skater
- John I. Nicks (1822–1897), New York politician
- Stevie Nicks (born 1948), singer-songwriter

== See also ==
- Nix (disambiguation)
- Nia (given name)
- Nick (disambiguation)
- Nix (disambiguation)
- New York Knicks, basketball team
