= Pilifer =

Part of a hearing organ found on the heads of hawkmoths

A pilifer ("hair-bearing") or labral pilifer is part of a hearing organ found on the heads of hawkmoths of the subtribe Choerocampina. This organ detects the high-pitched echolocation sounds of insectivorous bats, and enables the moth to elude them.

Each of these two "ears" consists of a chordotonal organ of a single sensory cell attached to the base of the labral pilifer, a bristled structure located next to the moth's tongue. This organ functions in conjunction with the labial palp, the second segment of which is inflated and free of scales. In its normal configuration the distal lobe of the pilifer and the inner surface of the inflated palp segment are in close contact, the latter functioning as receiver.
