= International rankings of Argentina =

The following are international rankings of Argentina:

== Demographics ==
- Population ranked 37 in the world
- Life expectancy ranked 59 in the world

== Economy ==
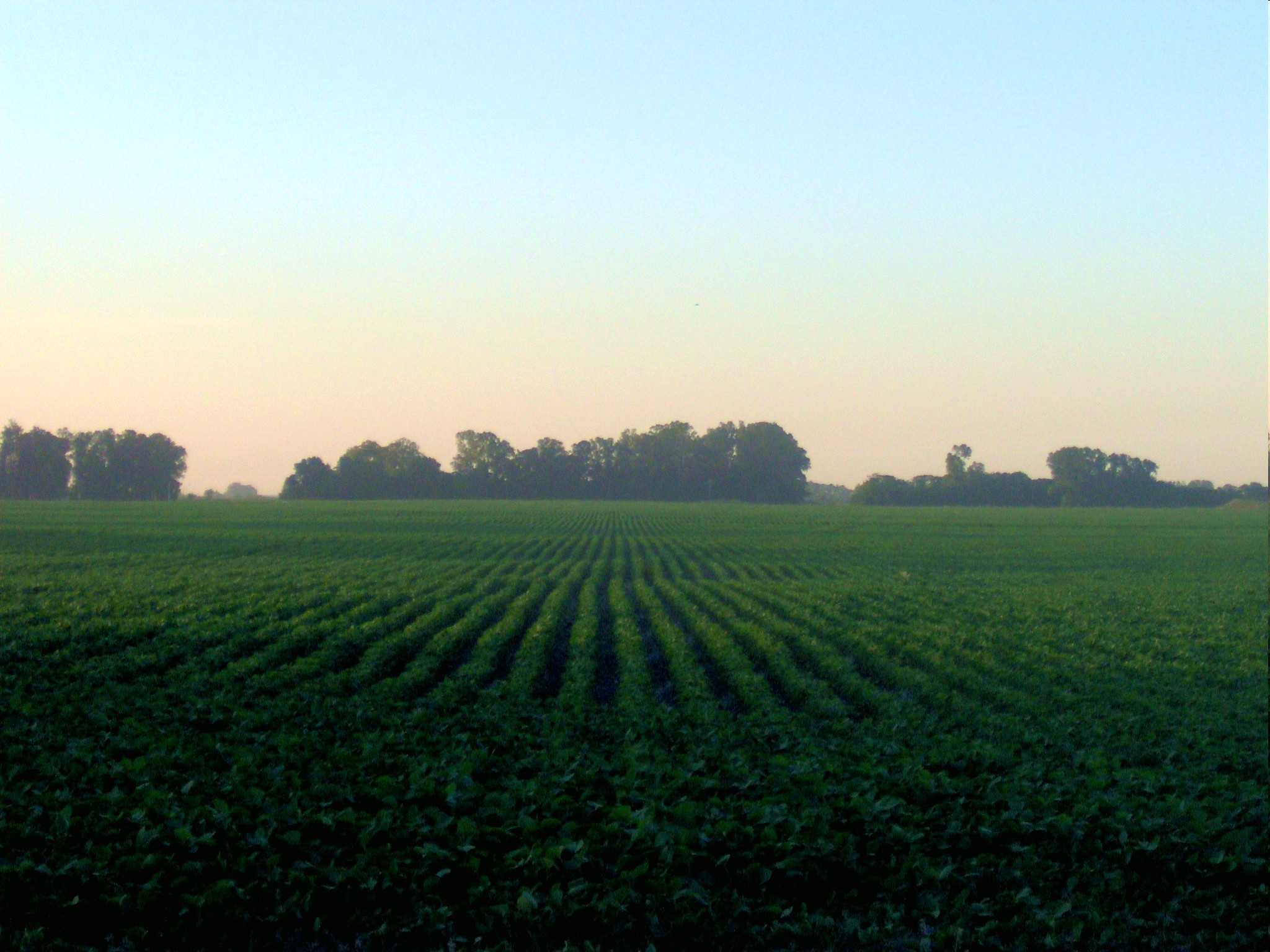
Soybeans make up about half of Argentina's crop production and a fourth of its exports

- The Wall Street Journal and The Heritage Foundation: 2012 Index of Economic Freedom, ranked 158 out of 179 countries
- Fraser Institute 2009 Economic Freedom of the World, ranked 119 of 141 countries
- International Monetary Fund: GDP (nominal) per capita 2010, ranked 61 out of 182 countries
- International Monetary Fund: GDP (nominal) 2010, ranked 27 out of 181 countries
- World Economic Forum: Global Competitiveness Index 2011-2012, ranked 85 out of 142 countries

== Education ==
- Books published per country per year ranked 27 in the world

== Environment ==
- Environmental Sustainability Index 2005, ranked 9 out of 146 countries
- Yale University and Columbia University: Environmental Performance Index 2010, ranked 70 in the world
- New Economics Foundation: 2012 Happy Planet Index ranked 17

== Geography ==
- Total land area ranked 8 among all countries

== Globalization ==
- A.T. Kearney/Foreign Policy Magazine: Globalization Index 2010, ranked 70 out of 181 countries

== Politics ==
- Transparency International: 2011 Corruption Perceptions Index, ranked 100 out of 182 countries
- Reporters Without Borders: 2011-2012 Press Freedom Index, ranked 47 out of 179 countries
- Fund for Peace: 2012 Failed States Index ranked 145 out of 165 (inverted ranking)

== Society ==
- Economist Intelligence Unit: Quality-of-life index 2005, ranked 40 out of 111 countries
- United Nations: Human Development Index 2011, ranked 45 out of 187 countries
- University of Leicester 2006 Satisfaction with Life Index, ranked 56 out of 178 countries
- Gallup World Poll 2010, ranked 30 out of 155

== Technology ==
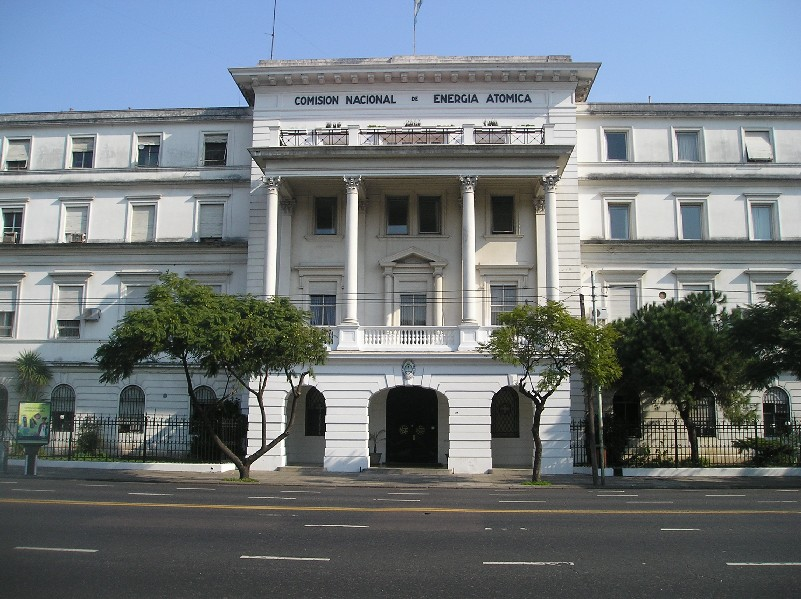
The National Atomic Energy Commission, established in 1950, was the world's first outside superpowers US and USSR; by 1957 Argentina had created a research reactor

- Economist Intelligence Unit e-readiness rankings 2009, ranked 45 out of 70 countries
- Total broadband Internet users ranked 20 in the world
- World Intellectual Property Organization: Global Innovation Index 2026, ranked 75 out of 139 countries

== See also ==
- Lists of countries
- Lists by country
- List of international rankings
