= NIC Argentina =

The Network Information Center Argentina, or NIC Argentina, is an office of the Legal and Technical Secretariat of the Presidency of Argentina responsible for operating the .ar country code top-level domain (ccTLD).

Delegation for the .ar ccTLD, was requested on 20 August 1987, as part of the transition to the Internet Domain Name System. The delegation was approved and became effective on 13 September 1987. Since then, the Argentine Foreign Ministry has been the sole sponsor and entity responsible for the management of Internet Domain Names for the .AR ccTLD, this role was reaffirmed by Executive Decree 267/2005 on 4 April 2005.

Until Argentina was able to establish its first permanent connection to the global Internet, name services were provided by UUNET.

Current contact information for the .AR ccTLD can be obtained from the IANA Root Zone Database.
