= NIC =

NIC may refer to:

== Banking and insurance companies ==
- National Insurance Corporation, Uganda
- NIC Bank, previous name of a commercial bank in Kenya

== Politics, government and economics ==
- National Ice Center, an agency that provides worldwide navigational ice analyses for the United States military and government
- National Incubation Center, Ignite - National Technology Fund, Ministry of IT & Telecom, Government of Pakistan
- National Iranian Congress, a U.S.-based political organization for a free and democratic Iran
- Natal Indian Congress, a political party in South Africa formed by Mohandas Karamchand Gandhi
- National Implementation Committee on FATA Reforms, a committee chaired by the Prime Minister of Pakistan regarding the Federally Administered Tribal Areas
- National Indigenous Council, an advisory body to the Australian Government from late 2004 to early 2008
- National Informatics Centre, Government of India
- National Infrastructure Commission, a UK government body advising on large-scale infrastructure projects
- National Innovation Council (Philippines), the Philippine government's highest policy-making body for national innovation development
- National Institute of Corrections, a division of the United States Department of Justice
- National Insurance Contributions, UK contributions towards state benefits
- National Integration Council of India, to combat the problems of Communalism, casteism and Regionalism
- National Intelligence Council (Japan), intelligence council of the Japanese government
- National Intelligence Council (United States), center for midterm and long-term strategic thinking within the United States intelligence community
- National Irrigation Commission, Jamaica agricultural irrigation government commission
- Newly industrialized country, a socio-economic classification status used by political scientists
- Nicaragua, the ISO 3166-1 three-letter country code
- NIC Argentina, Network Information Center, an office of Argentina's Ministry of Foreign Affairs
- Niger–Congo languages, the ISO 639-2 three-letter language code
- NIC Inc. (eGov.com), an information service provider for federal and state government in the United States

== Technology ==
- Negative impedance converter, configuration of an operational amplifier which acts as a negative load
- InterNIC, originally the Network Information Center (NIC), handling names and numbers for the ARPANET and the Internet
- Network information center, a synonym for a domain name registry
- Network interface controller, electronic hardware that enables a computer to communicate over a computer network
- New Internet Computer, former inexpensive Linux-based network computer

== Science and medicine ==
- A brand name for the drug lorazepam
- Nomarski interference contrast, a technique in microscopy

== Other topics ==
- "NIC", a song by Nines (rapper)
- National identity card (Sri Lanka), an identity document in Sri Lanka
- Nagoya International Center, a non-profit organization based in Nakamura-ku, Nagoya, Japan
- National Ice Centre, an ice and music arena in Nottingham, England
- Nebraska Innovation Campus, an academic research campus in Lincoln, Nebraska
- New In Chess, a chess magazine issued eight times a year
- NIC Zuidlaren, an international horse riding competition in Zuidlaren, Netherlands
- The IATA airport code for Nicosia International Airport, an abandoned airport near Nicosia in Cyprus
- North Idaho College, a community college located in Coeur d'Alene, Idaho
- North Island College, a community college complex on the northern half of Vancouver Island, Canada
- North American Interfraternity Conference, an association of collegiate men's fraternities formally organized in 1910
- Nursing Interventions Classification, a classification system for nursing

== See also ==
- Nic, a given name
- Nick (disambiguation)
- Nix (disambiguation)
