= List of music artists and bands from Argentina =

This is a list of music artists and bands from Argentina, categorized according to musical genre.

== Old Cumbia Villera ==
- Damas Gratis

== Tango ==
- Mario Abramovich
- Alfredo De Angelis
- Carlos Acuña
- Eduardo Arolas
- Juan d'Arienzo
- Rodolfo Biagi
- Eladia Blázquez
- Manuel Buzón
- Enrique Cadícamo
- Miguel Caló
- Alberto Caracciolo
- Julio de Caro
- Cacho Castaña
- Cátulo Castillo
- Pascual Contursi
- Ignacio Corsini
- Enrique Mario Francini
- Carlos Gardel
- Roberto Goyeneche
- Agustín Magaldi
- Eduardo Makaroff
- Juan Pablo Jofre
- Raúl Kaplún
- Francisco Lomuto
- Alberto Morán
- Mariano Mores
- Marcelo Nisinman
- Astor Piazzolla
- Edmundo Rivero
- Enrique Santos Discépolo
- Carlos di Sarli
- Héctor Varela (musician)

== Cuarteto ==
- La Mona Jiménez
- Rodrigo

== Chamamé ==
- Chango Spasiuk

== Other Argentine folk music ==
- Jorge Cafrune
- Eduardo Falú
- Horacio Guarany
- Ginamaría Hidalgo
- El Chaqueño Palavecino
- Ariel Ramírez
- Atahualpa Yupanqui

== Nueva canción, Nueva Trova/protest music ==
- Facundo Cabral
- César Isella

== Bolero ==
- Estela Raval

== Argentine-Spaniard fusion ==
- Los Rodríguez

== Reggae ==
- Fidel Nadal
- Los Pericos

== Ska ==
- Los Fabulosos Cadillacs
- La Mosca Tsé - Tsé

== Rock ==
- Rata Blanca
- Andrés Calamaro
- Fabiana Cantilo
- Gustavo Cerati
- Los Auténticos Decadentes
- Ariel Nan
- Charly García
- Fito Páez
- Patricio Rey y sus Redonditos de Ricota
- Soda Stereo
- Luis Alberto Spinetta
- Enanitos Verdes
- Bersuit Vergarabat
- Vicentico
- Vilma Palma e Vampiros

== Hip hop ==
- Illya Kuryaki and the Valderramas

== Electropop ==
- Miranda!
- Entre Ríos (band)
- Juana Molina

== Pop ==
- Lali Espósito
- Bahiano
- Leo Dan
- Alejandro Lerner
- Miguel Mateos
- Abel Pintos
- Diego Torres
- Erreway

== Ballad ==
- Alberto Cortez

== Instrumental ==
- Gustavo Santaolalla

== Piano ==
- Martha Argerich
- Bruno Gelber
