= List of extreme points of Argentina =

This is a list of the extreme points of Argentina, the points that are farther north, south, east or west than any other location, and the highest and lowest points.

== Latitude and longitude ==
=== Argentina ===
- Northernmost point: Confluence from the Grande de San Juan River and the Mojinete River, Jujuy Province: 21°48′S 66°13′W
- Southernmost point: Islote Blanco (near Cape San Pío), Beagle Channel, Tierra del Fuego Province: 55°3′51″S 66°33′06″W ¹
- Westernmost point: Cerro Agassiz, Santa Cruz Province: 49°57′39.90208″S 73°27′4.86976″W²
- Easternmost point: Bernardo de Irigoyen, Misiones Province: 26°10′S 53°41′W ³

¹ If the Argentine claims on South Georgia and the South Sandwich Islands are considered, the southernmost point is Thule Island: 59°27′S 27°18′W. If Argentine Antarctica claims are considered (in contradiction of the Antarctic Treaty) the southernmost point is at the South Pole (90°0′S 0°0′W).
² If Argentine Antarctica claims are considered (in contradiction of the Antarctic Treaty) the westernmost part is the 74ºW meridian over Antarctica.
³ If the Argentine claims on South Georgia and the South Sandwich Islands are considered, the easternmost point is Montagu Island: 58°25′S 26°23′W. sa

=== Argentina (mainland) ===
- Northernmost point: Confluence between the Grande de San Juan River and the Mojinete River, Jujuy Province 21°48′S 66°13′W
- Southernmost point: Punta Dúngeness, Santa Cruz 52°24′S 68°26′W
- Westernmost point: Cerro Agassiz, Santa Cruz Province: 49°57′39.90208″S 73°27′4.86976″W
- Easternmost point: Bernardo de Irigoyen, Misiones Province 26°10′S 53°41′W

== Altitude ==
- Highest point: Aconcagua, Mendoza, 6,962 m 32°39′S 70°14′W
- Lowest point: Laguna del Carbón, Santa Cruz, -105 m 49°35′S 68°21′W
