= .ar =

Top-level Internet domain for Argentina

- Introduced: 23 September 1987
- TLD type: Country code top-level domain
- Status: Active
- Registry: NIC Argentina
- Sponsor: Government of Argentina (SLyTP)
- Intended use: Entities connected with Argentina
- Actual use: Very popular in Argentina
- Registered domains: 670,633 (November 2022)
- Registration restrictions: Must have contact with address in Argentina, but registrant may be foreign; some subdomains have particular restrictions
- Structure: Registrations are at third level beneath second level labels
- Documents: Government resolution on domain registration
- Registry website: https://nic.ar/

.ar is the Internet country code top-level domain (ccTLD) for Argentina, administered by NIC Argentina.

== Registration ==
Registering an .ar domain (like website.ar) directly is allowed as of 2020.

Previously, only 9 of the second-level domains listed below were open for registration, and a local presence in Argentina was required.

As of August 2024, some new augmented reality companies are using domains directly under the .ar TLD.

== Second-level domains ==
As of January 2017 there are currently 12 second-level domains.

Domain	Intended use
com.ar	Companies and individual residents in Argentina
coop.ar	Registered cooperatives
edu.ar	Educational institutions; currently handled by ARIU (Asociación de Redes de Interconexión Universitaria).
gob.ar	Local and national government
gov.ar	Local and national government
int.ar	International entities and representatives of foreign international organizations in Argentina
mil.ar	Military use
mutual.ar	Registered mutual organizations
net.ar	Providers of internet services licensed by the Comisión Nacional de Comunicaciones
org.ar	Non-profit organizations, with a valid proof presented
senasa.ar	Legal and human persons related to the National Food Safety and Quality Service
seg.ar	Companies authorised by the Superintendence of National Insurance.
tur.ar	Tourism and travel companies licensed by the Ministerio de Turismo de la Nación; provincial or municipal government agencies promoting their respective provinces or municipalities
musica.ar	Any member listed in the National Registry of Musicians and National Musical Groups
bet.ar	Online gambling operators, licensed by local and national government

== Special characters ==
In November 2008, a resolution approved the use of special characters in domain names, including ñ, ç, á, é, í ó, ú, ä, ë, ï, ö, and ü.

The .gob.ar domain was also approved for government entities (.gob stands for "gobierno", government in Spanish).

== See also ==
- Internet in Argentina
