= Nick (surname) =

Nick may be a surname. Notable people with the surname include:

- Désirée Nick, German actress and writer
- Peter Nick (born 1962), German molecular biologist

== See also ==
- Nick (given name)
