= Nick =

Nick may refer to:

== Personal name ==
- Nick (given name)
- Nick (surname)

== Places ==
- Nick, Hungary, a village
- Nick, Warmian-Masurian Voivodeship, Poland, a village

== Other uses ==
- Nick, Allied codename for Japanese World War II fighter Kawasaki Ki-45
- Nick (DNA), an element of DNA structure
- Nickelodeon, a children's television channel whose name is often shortened to Nick
  - Nick (German TV channel)
- Nick (novel), a 2021 novel by Michael Farris Smith
- Nick's, a jazz tavern in New York City
- A cricket term for a slight deviation of the ball off the edge of the bat
- Nick, short for nickname, informal name of a person, place, or thing

== See also ==
- Nicks, surname
- NIC (disambiguation)
- Nik (disambiguation)
- Nix (disambiguation)
- Old Nick (disambiguation)
- Knick (disambiguation)
