= Nyx (moth) =

Scientific classification
- Kingdom: Animalia
- Phylum: Arthropoda
- Clade: Pancrustacea
- Class: Insecta
- Order: Lepidoptera
- Family: Millieriidae
- Genus: Nyx; Heppner, 1982

Genus of moths

Nyx is a genus of moths in the family Choreutidae.

== Species ==
Nyx contains two species:

- Nyx puyaphaga Heppner, 1982
- Nyx viscachensis Beeche, 1998
