= Millieriidae =

- Millieria dolosalis

Scientific classification
- Kingdom: Animalia
- Phylum: Arthropoda
- Clade: Pancrustacea
- Class: Insecta
- Order: Lepidoptera
- Clade: Neolepidoptera
- Infraorder: Heteroneura
- Clade: Eulepidoptera
- Clade: Ditrysia
- Family: Millieriidae; Stainton, 1854

Subfamilies and genera
- Millieria Ragonot, 1874; Phormoestes Heppner, 1982; Nyx Heppner, 1982

Diversity
- 3 genera and 4 species

Small family of moths

Millieriidae is a small family of moths in the lepidopteran order. It was described as by Henry Tibbats Stainton in 1854 as a subfamily of Choreutidae.
