= Nik (disambiguation) =

Nik is a gender-neutral given name. Nik or NIK may also refer to:

== Places in Iran ==
- Nik, alternate name of Nik Shahr, a city
- Nik, South Khorasan, a village
- Nik, alternate name of Nig, Iran, a village
- Nik, alternate name of Novik, Iran, a village

== Other uses ==
- -nik, an English suffix of Slavic origin
- Nik family of Kelantan, a lineage in Malaysia
- NIK, the Supreme Audit Office (Poland) (Najwyższa Izba Kontroli)
- Nomor Induk Kependudukan, the national single identity number of Indonesian identity card
- One of the three 2002 FIFA World Cup mascots
- MAP3K14, NFkB Inducing Kinase
- Nik Software, producer of image processing applications

== See also ==
- Nick (disambiguation)
