= Pfizer (disambiguation) =

Pfizer may refer to:

- Pfizer (est. 1849), a multinational pharmaceutical company founded in the U.S. by German immigrants in the 19th century
  - Pfizer Animal Health (est. 1956), a former division focused on veterinary pharmacology that was spun-off in 2012, now called as Zoetis
  - Pfizer UK (est. 1952), the British subsidiary of the multinational
  - Pfizer–BioNTech COVID-19 vaccine
- Pfizer Award, an annual award for the best book on the history of science, awarded by the History of Science Society
- Pfizer Award in Enzyme Chemistry, an award for chemists in enzyme chemistry who are under 40 years old, administered by the Division of Biological Chemistry of the American Chemical Society
- Royal Society Pfizer Award, awarded by the British Royal Society for Africa-based scientists in biological sciences
- Pfizer Human Rights Award, see FICCO
- Charles Pfizer (1824–1906), co-founder of the pharma company Pfizer
- Gustav Pfizer (1807–1890), German poet

== See also ==
- Mason-Pfizer monkey virus
- Pfizer's rule of five, a rule of thumb for determining if a pharmacologically active chemical compound is likely to become an orally active drug in humans
- Pfizer-e (erythromycin)
- Pfitzer (surname)
- Pfitzner (disambiguation)
- Pfitz (disambiguation)
- Fizer
