= Fitz (disambiguation) =

Fitz is a prefix to patronymic surnames of Anglo-Norman origin.

Fitz may also refer to:

== People ==
- Fitz (surname), a list of people so named
- Fitz (given name), a list of people with the given name or nickname
- Michael Fitzpatrick (musician), the "Fitz" of the band Fitz and the Tantrums

== Fictional characters ==
- Dr. Edward Fitzgerald, protagonist in the British TV series Cracker
- FitzChivalry Farseer, a character in Robin Hobb's Farseer Trilogy
- Percy Fitzwallace, from the TV series The West Wing
- Fitzgerald Grant, President of the United States in the TV series Scandal
- Isaac Prophet Fitzpatrick, a main character in the novel Fitzpatrick's War
- Fitz Kreiner, a companion of the Doctor Who in the "Eighth Doctor Adventures" novels
- Mark "Fitz" Fitzgerald, on season 10 of Degrassi
- Leo Fitz, main character of the TV series Marvel's Agents of S.H.I.E.L.D. and later in Marvel Comics.
- Richard Fitzpatrick, protagonist of the Canadian TV series Call Me Fitz
- Fitz, original name of the cartoon character Bimbo
- Mouse Fitzgerald, the main character in the Adult Swim series 12 oz. Mouse
- Fitz, in the Keeper of the Lost Cities fantasy novel series

== Places ==
- Fitz, Shropshire, a small village in England
- Fitz Park, a public park in Keswick, Cumbria

== TV series ==
- Cracker (American TV series) (broadcast as Fitz in several countries), the American remake of Cracker
- The Fitz, a short-lived British sitcom

== Other uses ==
- Fitz's root beer
- Fitzwilliam College, Cambridge, commonly abbreviated "Fitz", a constituent college of the University of Cambridge
- Fitz Casino & Hotel, a casino in Las Vegas, Nevada, now called The D Las Vegas
- Fitz Motorsports and Fitz Racing, American NASCAR
- Fitz Manor, a manor house and hotel in Montford Bridge, Shropshire, England

== See also ==
- Old Fitzgerald or "Old Fitz", a brand of bourbon
- Pfitz (disambiguation)
