= Pfitzner =

Pfitzner may refer to:

== Other uses ==
- Pfitzner Flyer (aeroplane), a 1909 monoplane
- Pfitzner–Moffatt oxidation, a chemical reaction
- Northwest Federal Field at Pfitzner Stadium, located in Prince William County, Virginia, US

== See also ==
- Pfizer (disambiguation)
- Pfitz (disambiguation)
- Pfitzer (surname)
- Fitzner (surname)
