= Fitts =

Fitts is a surname, which may refer to:

== People ==
=== Surname ===
- Arianna Fitts (born 2013), American child missing since 2016
- Buron Fitts (1895–1973), American lawyer and politician in California
- Catherine Austin Fitts (born 1950), American investment banker and former public official
- Clarke C. Fitts (1870–1916), American attorney and businessman in Vermont
- Dudley Fitts (1903–1968), American teacher, critic, poet, and translator
- Kylie Fitts (born 1994), American gridiron football player
- Margaret Fitts (1923–2011), American screenwriter and television writer
- Malik Fitts (born 1997), American basketball player
- Michael Fitts (born 1953), American legal scholar
- Paul Fitts (1912–1965), American psychologist
- Richard Fitts (born 1999), American baseball player
- Rick Fitts, American film and television actor
- Sheldon Fitts (1899–1985), American college football player
- Stacey Fitts (born 1962), American politician
- Wilson Fitts (1915–2005), American basketball player

=== Middle name ===
- William Fitts Ryan (1922–1972), American lawyer and politician in New York

== Other uses ==
- Fitts for Fight, a Norwegian musical duo
- Fitts's law (or Fitts' Law), a predictive model of human movement primarily used in human–computer interaction and ergonomics

== See also ==
- Fitz (surname)
