= List of compositions by Niels Gade =

The following is a list of compositions by Niels Gade (1817–1890).

A numbered, thematic catalogue of Gade's works was published online by the Royal Danish Library in 2019.

Year of composition	Op.	Title, scoring, key, and other details
1836	—	Overture, E
1836	—	Allegro, A minor, String quartet
1837	—	Andante & allegro molto, F minor String quintet (2 violins, viola and 2 cellos)
1839	—	Piano trio, B♭ major
1840	—	Seht', welch ein Mensch! Hymn. Choir a capella.
1840	—	Hilf uns, Gott, in unserm Streit. Gebeth. Choir a capella.
1840	1	Echoes of Ossian (Efterklange af Ossian), A minor Overture
1840	—	Fædrelandets muser, ballet, Johannes Frederik Frølich
1840	28	Piano Sonata in E minor (revised 1854)
1840	—	String quartet, F major
1840	—	Fem Fædrelandshistoriske Songs
		— Hvi synges evigt om Spartaner, Daniel Rantzau. Text by Adam Oehlenschläger
		— En Schweitzerbonde staar aarle ved Strand, Den sælsome Jordefærd. Text by Adam Oehlenschläger
		— Der risler en Kilde i Haraldsted Skov. Text by H. P. Holst
		— Før var der knap skrevet paa dansk en Bog, Ludvig Holberg. Text by C. Vilster
		— Paa Sjølunds fagre Sletter. Text by B. S. Ingemann
1841	2b	Spring Flowers (Foraarstoner), 3 Piano pieces. Revised Version 1873
		— Allegretto grazioso, F major
		— Andantino con moto, B♭ major
		— Allegretto cantabile, C major
1841	—	6 Songs. Christoph Ernst Friedrich Weyse
1842	3	Agnete og Havfruerne. Solo, female choir and orchestra. Text by H. C. Andersen
		— Jeg ved et Slot, dets Væg og Tag, Havfruesang
		— Sol deroppe ganger under Lide, Agnetes Vuggevise
1842	4	Nordiske Tonebilleder. Piano 4 hands
		Allegro risoluto, F major
		Allegretto quasi Andantino, F minor
		Allegro commodo, F major
1842	5	1st Symphony, C minor, Paa Sjølunds fagre Sletter
1842	6	1st violin sonata, A major
1842	—	Napoli. Ballet by August Bournonville. (H. S. Paulli & Edvard Helsted)
1842	—	3 Songs. Text by Christian Winther
1843	10	2nd Symphony, E major
1844	7	In the Highlands (I Højlandet), D major. Overture
1845	8	String quintet, E minor. 2 violins, 2 violas, cello
1845	9	Nine folksongs. Soli and piano. Text by ?
1845	11	6 Songs. Male choir
1846	12	Comala. Cantata. Soli, choir and orchestra. Text after Ossian
1846	13	5 Songs. Choir a capella. Text by Emanuel Geibel
		— Der Frühling ist ein starker Held, Ritter Frühling
		— Die stille Wasserrose steigt, Die Wasserrose
		— Wer recht in Freuden wandern will, Morgenwanderung
		— Feldeinwärts fland ein, Herbstlied
		— Im Wald im hellen Sonnenschein, Im Wald
1846	14	Overture (No. 3), C major
1846	—	O du, der du die Liebe bist. Choir and strings. Text by ?
1847	15	3rd Symphony, A minor
1848	16	Horseman's Life (Ridderliv). 6 Songs. Male choir. Text by C. Schultes
1848	18	Three character pieces, Piano 4 hands
		— Bortreisen, C major
		— Valpladsen, E minor
		— Hjemkomsten, E major
1849	17	Octet, F major, 4 violins, 2 violas and 2 cellos
1849	21a	2nd violin sonata, D minor
1849	21b	Three digte. Text by Carsten Hauch
		— Herr Magnus han stirrer i Vinternatten ud, Knud Lavard
		— Hvorfor svulmer Weichselfloden, Polsk Fædrelandssang
		— Hvi staar du saa ensom o Birketræ, Birken
1849	—	Mariotta. Syngestykke. Text by Carl Borgaard efter Eugène Scribe
1850	19	Akvareller, Piano
1850	20	4th Symphony, B♭ major
1850	—	Nordisk Sæterrejse, F major. Lystspil Overture
1850	—	3 Songs. Text by H. C. Andersen
1851	22	3 tone pieces, Organ
		— Tonestykke, F major
		— Tonestykke, C major
		— Tonestykke, A minor
1851	—	String quartet, F minor
1852	23	Spring Fantasy (Foraarsfantasi). Cantata. Soli, piano and orchestra. Text by Edmund Lobedanz
1852	24	Bilder des Orients. 5 songs. Text by Heinrich Stieglitz
		— Deine Stimme lass ertonen
		— Milde Abendlüfte wehen, Ständchen
		— Meinen Kranz hab' ich gesendet
		— Ihr habt genug getrunken, Am Brunnen
		— Wenn der letzte Saum des Tages
1852	25	5th Symphony, D minor, Piano
1852	—	Albumsblade. Piano
1852	—	3 Songs
		– bl. a.
		— Grøn er Vaarens Hæk, Aprilvise. Text by Poul Martin Møller
1852	—	Op thi Dagen nu frembryder. Text by Hans Adolph Brorson
1853	26	5 Songs. Male choir
1853	29	Novelletter, Piano trio
1854	27	Arabeske. Piano
1854	28	Piano sonata, E minor. Revision of the 1840 sonata
1854	30	Elverskud. Cantata. Soli, choir and orchestra. Text by Christian Molbech
1854	—	Et folkesagn. Ballet by August Bournonville. (Acts I and III; J. P. E. Hartmann composed the music for Act II)
1855	31	Folkedanse. Piano
1856	—	Udrust dig Helt fra Golgata. Text by Johannes Ewald
1856	—	O du, der du die Liebe bist. Choir a capella. Text by ? (Tidligere version 1846)
1856	—	Minde Cantata over Fru Anna Nielsen
1857	32	6th Symphony, G minor
1857	34	Idyller. Piano
		— I Blomsterhaven, G major
		— Ved Bækken, F major
		— Trækfugle, D major
		— Aftendæmring, D major
1857	—	Baldurs drøm. Cantata. Soli, choir and orchestra. Text by Adolph Hertz
1857	—	Fra skitsebanden. Piano
1858	33	5 Songs. Male choir
1858	35	Foraars-Budskab. Koncertstykke. Choir and orchestra. Text by Emanuel Geibel
1859	36	Children's Christmas (Børnenes Jul), Piano
		— Jule-Klokkerne, F major
		— Indgangsmarch, A major
		— Drengenes Runddans, A minor
		— Smaapigernes Dans, E major
		— Godnat!, F major
1859	—	Barn Jesus i en Krybbe laa. Text by H. C. Andersen
1859	—	Minde Cantata for Overhofmarschal Chamberlain Levetzau
1860	—	Andantino, C♯ minor. Piano
1860	—	Albumblad, C major. Piano
1860	—	Danserinden, F major. Piano
1860	—	Minde Cantata for Skuespiller Nielsen
1861	37	Hamlet, C minor. Overture
1861	39	Michelangelo, F major. Overture
1861	40	Die heilige Nacht. Cantata. Solo, choir and orchestra. Text after August von Platen-Hallermünde
1861	41	Four Fantastic Pieces. Piano
		— I Skoven, B major
		— Mignon, F minor
		— Eventyr, G minor
		— Ved Festen, B major
1861	—	Piano piece, B♭ major. Oprindelig skitse til Fantasistykke op 41
1861	—	Scherzino Akvarel. Piano
1862	38	5 Songs. Male choir
1863	42	Piano trio, F major
1863	—	Sørgemarch ved Kong Frederik. d. 7.'s Død D minor.
1863	—	Holger Danskes Songs. Text by B. S. Ingemann
		— Ved Leire græsse nu Faar paa Vold. Holger Danskes Vugge
		— Vær hilset mit gamle Fædreland, Holger Danskes hilsen til frænderne
		— Kong Gøttrik sad ene paa Leire Borg, Holgers bortsendelse
		— Jeg frit mig tumled i Verden om, Holger Danskes vej
		— Der klang til Danmark en Kæmpesang, Holgers kamp Burmand
		— Til Rosengaarden gik jeg i Jomfruens Baand, Prinsesse Gloriant
		— Tolv Riddere sad ved Kejserens Bord, De tolv jævninger
		— Faner vifted over Sjolde, De elleve jævningers jordefærd
		— Svart længtes jeg efter mit Fædreland, Holgers Orlov og Hjemfart
		— I alle de Riger og Lande, Holger Danskes mærke
		— Hvor Oberon lever, Ved mindernes kilde
		— Vær hilset mit gamle Fædreland, Holger Danskes Tilbagekomst til Danmark
1864	43	4 Fantasi pieces, clarinet and piano
1864	44	Sextet, E♭ major, 2 violins, 2 violas and 2 cellos
1864	45	7th Symphony, F major
1865	46	At Sunset (Ved solnedgang). Cantata. Choir and orchestra. Text by Andreas Munch
1866	50	The Crusaders (Korsfarerne). Cantata. Soli, choir and orchestra. Text by Carl Andersen
1869	48	Kalanus. Cantata. Soli, choir and orchestra. Text by Carl Andersen
1869	54	Gefion. Cantata. Baritone, choir and orchestra. Text by Adam Oehlenschläger
1869	—	Festsang i Rosenborg Have. Choir and piano. Text by Frederik Paludan-Müller (?)
1871	47	8th Symphony, B minor
1871	51	Seasonal Pictures (Aarstidsbilleder). Soli, female choir and orchestra. Text by Carl Andersen
		— Som Skygger i den dunkle Nat, Sommernat
		— Trækfuglen flyver dristigt op, Løvfald
		— Det flagrer mod Bondens Rude, Julekvæld
		— Hvad dæmrer i Øst bag den rødmende Sky, Løvspring
1872	—	Festmusik til den nordiske Industriudstillings Aabningsfest. Choir. Text by Carl Ploug
1873	52	The Mountain Thrall (Den bjergtagne). Cantata. soli, male choir and orchestra. Text by Carsten Hauch
1873	2b	Spring Flowers (Foraarstoner), 3 piano pieces. (revised version of 1841 pieces)
		— Allegretto grazioso, F major
		— Andantino con moto, B♭ major
		— Allegretto cantabile, C major
1873	—	Festligt præludium over salmen "Lover den Herre". Organ
1874	49	Zion. Cantata. Baritone, choir and orchestra. Text by Carl Andersen
1874	53	Novelletter, F major, Strings
1875	2a	Rebus, 3 piano pieces
		— Scherzo, B♭ major
		— Intermezzo, G major
		— Alla marcia, C major
1876	—	Akvarel, A major, Piano
1877	—	String quartet, E minor.
1878	—	Capriccio, A minor. Violin and orchestra
1879	55	En Sommerdag paa Landet, Orchestral suite
1879	—	Festmusik i anledning by Universitetets 400 Aars Jubilæum
1879	—	Fiskerdrengen leger ved salten Vesterhav, Fiskerdrengen. Text by Chr. Richardt
1880	56	Violin concerto, D minor
1881	57	Nye Akvareller. Piano
		— Humoreske, A minor
		— Notturno, E major
		— Scherzo, D♭ major
		— Romanza, A major
		— Capriccio, F major
1882	60	Psyche. Cantata. Soli, choir and orchestra. Text by Carl Andersen
1883	—	Festmusik til nordisk Kunstnermøde
1884	61	Holbergiana, Orchestral suite
1884	—	Ulysses-March. Forspil til Holberg: Ulysses von Ithaca
1885	59	3rd violin sonata, B♭ major
1885	—	Benedictus and Amen. Choir and organ
1886	58	Novelletter, E major, Strings
1886	62	Folkedanse, Violin and piano
1889	63	String quartet, D major
1889	64	Der Strom. Cantata. Soli, choir, piano and orchestra. Text after Goethe's translation of Voltaire's Mahomet
1889	—	String quartet, E minor. Revision of the 1877 quartet
		Songs for which the year of composition is not known
		Agnete var elsket, uskyldig og god, Vise om Agnete og Havmanden. Text by H. C. Andersen
		Ak kæreste Hr. Gulds, Farvel lille Grete. Text by F. L. Høedt
		Alt oprejst Maanen staar, Fatimes aftensang. Text by Adam Oehlenschläger
		De Bølger rulle så tungt afsted, Liden Kirsten. Text by J. L. Heiberg
		De hvideste Perler i Havet er spredt, Den Elskede. Text by Carsten Hauch
		Der er saa travlt i Skoven. Text by Chr. Richardt
		Der var saa favrt under Lindens Løv. Text by ?
		Der var så sort i Kirken, Den 19. December 1863. Text by Chr. Richardt
		Der voksed et Træ i min Moders Gaard, Hemming spillemands sang. Text by H. C. Andersen
		En Songs henrykt til sit Hjerte trykker, Sommeren begynder. Text by ?
		Farvel mit elskte Moderhjem! Flygtningen. Text by Carsten Hauch
		Fluen flyver om Lysets Skin, Fluen. Text by Julius Christian Gerson
		Fra kvalmfulde Mure. Text by Adam Oehlenschläger
		Går det, Herre, som jeg vil. Salme. Text by N. F. S. Grundtvig
		Hvad toner gennem Skoven. Text by J. L. Heiberg
		Hvor Elven kækt gennem Kløften sprang, Fjeldbroen. Text by Carl Andersen
		Hytten er lukket, Natten er stille, Serenade ved Strandbredden. Text by Chr. Winther
		Højt ligger paa Marken den hvide Sne, Snedronningen. Text by H. C. Andersen
		I din Haand, du lille blinker, Til min egen Dreng. Text by Ludvig Bødtcher
		I Jesu Navn er Løftets Ord udsagt, Bryllupssang. Text by Johs. Petersen
		Jeg gik mig i den dunkle Skov, Jægerens Sommerliv. Text by Henrik Hertz
		Jeg lader Baaden glide frem, En Situation. Text by Chr. Winther
		Køb Herre, Frugter, liflig i Smag og Skær, Den lille Frugtsælgerske. Text by Julius Christian Gerson
		Lette Bølge! Når du blåner, Barcarole. Text by J. L. Heiberg
		Lærken synger sin Morgensang, Fiskerdrengens Vise. Text by H. C. Andersen
		Min lille Fugl, hvor flyver du. Romance. Text by H. C. Andersen
		Natten er saa stille, Barcarole. Text by J. L. Heiberg
		Naar det dufter sødt fra Blomsters Flor. Text by ?
		Paaske vi holde. Text by N. F. S. Grundtvig
		Rinda min Brud! Skalks Sang. Text by Adam Oehlenschläger
		Rosen sidder på tronen, Rosen. Text by Chr. Winther
		Rød Maanen skinner blandt Stjerner smaa, Havfruen. Text by B. S. Ingemann
		Sig Himlen hvælver saa ren og klar, Martsvioler. Text by H. C. Andersen
		Smaa Violer! O hvor sødt, Violerne. Text by Adam Oehlenschläger
		Som markens blomst henvisner fage. Salme. Text by N. F. S. Grundtvig
		Sov sødt i din Vugge, Vuggesang. Text by Niels W. Gade
		Spillemand spiller paa Strenge, Spillemanden. Text by B. S. Ingemann
		Stæren sad paa Kviste, Naar Solen skinner. Text by Barner
		Tre Rejsende drog fra Herberget ud, Den Eenlige. Text by B. S. Ingemann
		Ved Bækken jeg sidder, Pigens Sang ved Bækken. Text by B. S. Ingemann
		Vi grave dybt i sorten Muld, Bjergmandssang. Text by Chr. Winther
		Vi vandre sammen Arm i Arm, Skovsang. Text by Emil d'Origny
		Da droben auf jenem Berge, Schäfers Klagelied. Text by J. W. v. Goethe
		Der treue Walther ritt vorbei, Vom treuen Walther. Text by L. Uhland
		Fahr' mich hinüber junger Schiffer, Der Gondolier. Text by Wilhelm Wagner
		Ich bin ein leichter Junggesell, Der Junggesell. Text by Gustav Pfizer
		Lebet wohl, geliebte Bäume. Text by J. W. v. Goethe
		Mein Schatz ist auf die Wanderschaft hin, Volkslied
		Von dem Felsen stürzt' ein Stein, Das Liebes-Denkmal. Text by Wincenty Pol
		Organ works for which the year of composition is not known
		By Højheden oprunden er. Organ
		Aleneste Gud i Himmerig. Organ
		Andante con moto, D minor. Organ
		Andante, C major. Organ
		Andante, G minor. Organ
		Fra Himlen højt kom Budskab her (i). Organ
		Fra Himlen højt kom Budskab her (ii). Organ
		Hvo ikkun lader Herren raade (i). Organ
		Hvo ikkun lader Herren raade (ii). Organ
		Orgelstykke, C minor
		Sørgemarch. Organ
		Tonestykke, D minor. Organ
		Trio, C major. Organ
		Trio, F major. Organ
		Vor Gud han er saa fast en Borg. Choral & variations. Organ

== Bibliography ==
Catalogues

- Sørensen, Inger (2019). Niels W. Gade. Thematic-Bibliographic Catalogue of His Works. Copenhagen: Multivers. ISBN 978-87-791-7034-6. Also online: "Niels W. Gade. Thematic-Bibliographic Catalogue of His Works". 2019..
