= Pfitz (disambiguation) =

Pfitz may refer to:

- Pfitz, a 1999 novel by Andrew Crumey
- The Pfitz, nickname of Pfitzner Stadium, Prince William County, Virginia, USA; a baseball field
- "Pfitz.", a botanical author abbreviation used for Ernst Hugo Heinrich Pfitzer
- Carmen Pfitz (1909-1999), mother of Jaime Zobel de Ayala y Pfitz, and a member of the Zóbel de Ayala family
- Jaime Zobel de Ayala y Pfitz (born 1934) Philippine businessman, and member of the Zóbel de Ayala family
- Larry Pfitz, a fictional character from William Boyd's On the Yankee Station
- Pfitz, a fictional character (not the main character) from the Andrew Crumey novel Pfitz

== See also ==
- Pfitzer (surname)
- Fitz (disambiguation)
- Pitz (disambiguation)
- Pfizer (disambiguation)
- Pfitzner (disambiguation)
