= Ann Fitz =

American attorney (born 1977)

Ann Marie Fitz (born April 5, 1977) is an American criminal defense attorney who has appeared as a legal analyst on cable news programs.

== Background ==
Ann Fitz, an only child, was born in Bay Village, Ohio, but moved to Marietta, Georgia at the age of 10. She graduated from George Walton Comprehensive High School in 1995 and received her bachelor's degree from Furman University in 1999, where she double-majored in English and Communications. Later she earned her Juris Doctor (J.D.) from the Walter F. George School of Law at Mercer University in 2003.

Fitz is licensed to practice law in Florida, Georgia, New York, California, Ohio and South Carolina. She has twenty years of nationwide experience as a federal litigator and is based in West Palm Beach, Florida. She is a former prosecutor, and started her own firm in 2007. In addition to her private practice she served for 7 years as a Panel Attorney under the Criminal Justice Act (CJA) in conjunction with the Federal Defender's Office in Atlanta and Los Angeles. She is currently a CJA Attorney for the Southern District of Florida and a Public Arbitrator for FINRA. In private criminal defense practice, she has handled numerous high-profile federal criminal cases.

She was selected as a Rising Star by Super Lawyers in 2013, 2014, and 2016, an honor bestowed upon less than 2% of all lawyers under the age of 40, and was named a Top 100 Criminal Litigator by The National Trial Attorneys in 2019. She has drawn the local and national spotlight with her distinctive legal representation, having been the subject of articles in the Fulton County Daily Report, the Atlanta Journal-Constitution, Rolling Stone Magazine and Wired Magazine, and featured in stories aired on WXIA-TV, WSB-TV and AM 750, as well as 48 Hours Mystery and NBC Nightly News.

== Notable Cases ==
Perhaps the best-known case Fitz has litigated was the federal identity fraud case against Esther Elizabeth Reed, who had conned her way into Harvard and Columbia University under the stolen identity of a missing woman named Brooke Henson from Travelers Rest, South Carolina. Reed's exploits drew the national spotlight when she was listed as a United States Secret Service's 10 most wanted fugitive and became the subject of articles in the New York Post and Rolling Stone Magazine, as well as being featured on America's Most Wanted and two episodes of 48 Hours Mystery. Fitz argued that Reed's behavior was a result of mental health issues caused by a strict family upbringing. Reed was facing a potential 47 years in prison, entered a plea of guilty to 4 felony counts and received a sentence of 51 months.

In 2009, Fitz launched a constitutional challenge against a provision in Georgia's sex offender registration law mirroring the Adam Walsh Act, which required that an individual convicted of kidnapping or false imprisonment of a minor without an underlying sexual offense is subject to lifetime registration as a convicted sex offender. On March 15, 2010, the Georgia Supreme Court upheld the constitutionality of the law in a 5-2 decision, based on a United States Department of Justice report finding that 46% of all kidnapping and false imprisonment of minor cases involve some type of sexual offense; however, the dissenting jurists noted that as registration limits where offenders may live, work and congregate, it "is not a requirement that should be imposed cavalierly", and a statutory scheme that has an "error rate of over 50% is clearly not rational". On March 16, 2010, Georgia's House passed a bill to remedy the issue by a vote of 165-1. The bill was subsequently passed unanimously by the Senate and signed into law by Governor Sonny Perdue on May 20, 2010.

Fitz challenged the constitutionality of the Florida sex offender registration in 2019 on behalf of an out-of-state offender who had no jurisdictional ties to Florida and was not required to register in his home state. The case was dismissed due to the statute of limitations.

In 2023, Fitz represented Peaches Stergo, who pled guilty to stealing $2.8 million from an 87 year-old Holocaust survivor in a romance scam in Manhattan federal court.

== Television, Radio and Print ==
From June 2006 to November 2011, Fitz served as a legal analyst on various cable television news programs on the Fox News Channel, MSNBC, CNN, and HLN, and appeared as a regular guest on truTV's In Session, formerly CourtTV (from 2009-2011). In addition to discussing the ins-and-outs of headline legal stories in this capacity, she has also covered many high-profile legal cases, including the Duke Lacrosse case; the Phil Spector murder trial; the Warren Jeffs polygamy trial; the Elizabeth Smart kidnapping trial; and, most substantially, the trial of Dr. Conrad Murray in 2011.

In addition to national programming, Fitz appeared as a legal expert on local Atlanta television and radio shows airing on WAGA-TV and AM 640 WGST in Atlanta. Her opinions have been cited in various print and online articles, locally, nationally, and internationally.
