= Fitz (surname) =

Fitz is the surname of:

- Ann Fitz (born 1977), American attorney
- Brent Fitz (born 1970), Canadian-American musician
- Hendrikje Fitz (1961–2016), German actress
- Henry Fitz (1808–1863), American telescope manufacturer
- Joseph Fitz (1886–1945), American Medal of Honor recipient
- Josef-August Fitz (1911–1977), highly decorated German World War II officer
- Mary Fitz (1596–1671), English noblewoman
- Peter Fitz (1931-2013), German actor
- Reginald Heber Fitz (1843–1913), American physician
- Veronika Fitz (1936–2020), German television actress
- Willy Fitz (1918–1993), Austrian footballer and coach

== See also ==
- The dictionary definition of Fitz- at Wiktionary
- Fitz (patronymic)
- Fitz (given name)
- Eva-Maria Fitze (born 1982), German figure skater
- Fitts (disambiguation)
