= Fitzner =

Fitzner is a surname. Notable people with the surname include:

- Ian Fitzner-Leblanc (born 1984), Canadian curler
- Irene Fitzner (born 1955), Argentine sprinter
- Jennifer Dahlgren Fitzner (born 1984), Argentine hammer thrower
- Rudolf Fitzner (1868–1934), Austrian violinist and music teacher
- William Fitzner
