= Fizer =

Fizer is a surname. Notable people with the surname include:

- Marcus Fizer (born 1978), American former professional basketball player
- William H. Fizer (1861–1937), American trainer of Thoroughbred racehorses

== See also ==
- Pfizer (disambiguation)
