= Pitz =

Pitz is a surname. Notable people with the surname include:

- Herman Pitz (1865–1924), Major League Baseball player
- Henry Clarence Pitz (1895–1976), US-American artist, illustrator, editor, author, and teacher

== See also ==
- Mesoamerican ballgame, known in Classical Maya as pitz
- 19182 Pitz, main-belt asteroid
- PITZ, Photo Injector Test Facility
- Pfitz (disambiguation)
