= The National WWII Museum =

US military history museum, founded 2000

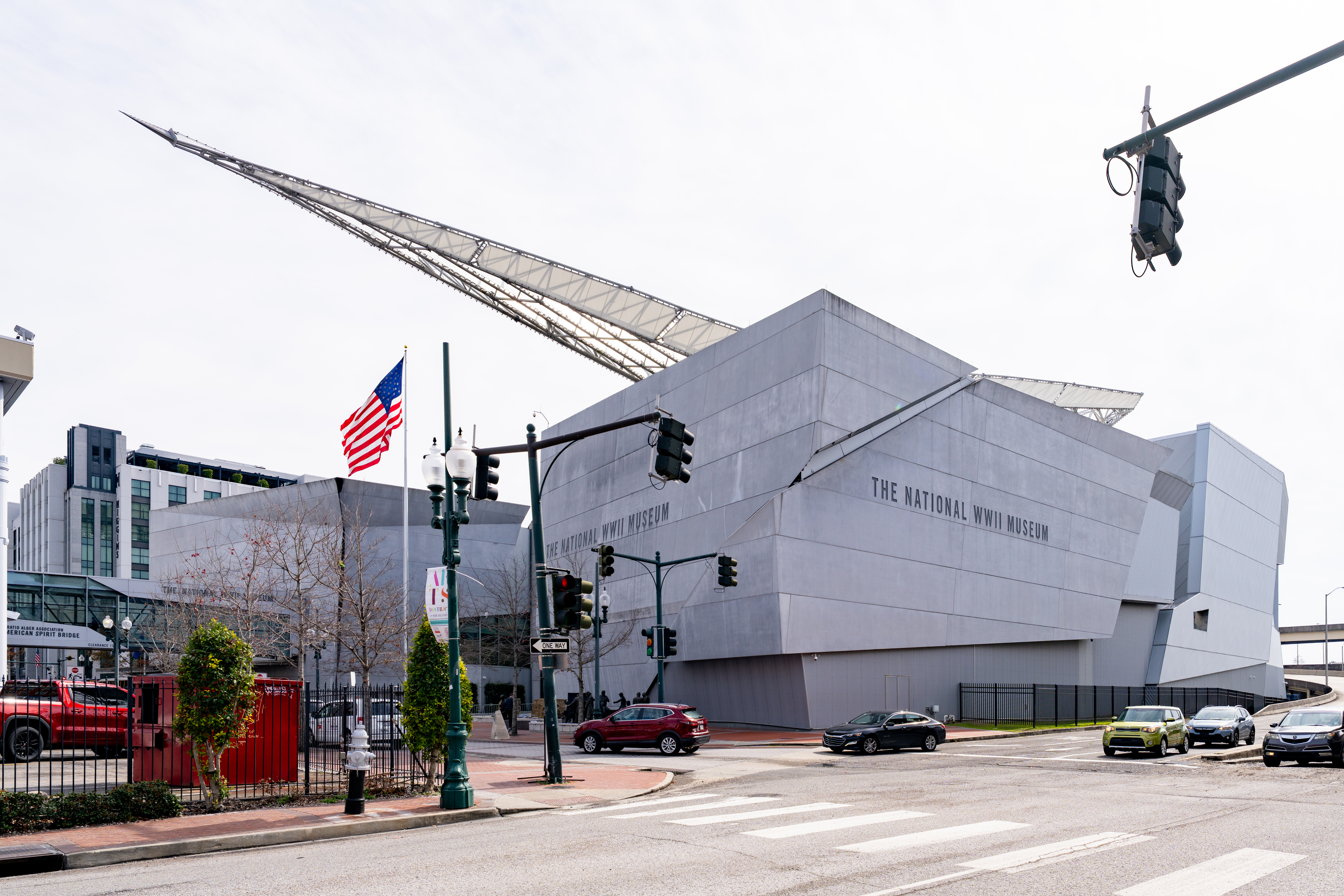
- The exterior of the museum in 2026.
- Former name: D-Day Museum
- Established: June 6, 2000
- Location: New Orleans, Louisiana, U.S.
- Coordinates: 29°56′35″N 90°04′13″W
- Type: Military history museum
- Visitors: 706,664 (2017)
- Website: nationalww2museum.org

The National WWII Museum is a military history museum in the Central Business District of New Orleans, Louisiana, United States, on Andrew Higgins Drive between Camp Street and Magazine Street. The museum focuses on the contribution made by the United States to Allied victory in World War II. It was founded in 2000 as the National D-Day Museum and was later designated by the U.S. Congress as America's official National WWII Museum in 2003. The museum is an affiliated museum of the Smithsonian Institution as part of its outreach program. The museum saw 406,251 visitors in 2010 and nearly 700,000 in fiscal year 2016.

== History ==
Plans for the museum date to 1964, when former president and retired U.S. Army general Dwight Eisenhower told historian and author Stephen Ambrose that the inventor of the LCVP, or Higgins boat, "won the war for us". The boats were designed, tested, and ultimately built by Andrew Higgins and his Higgins Industries in Ambrose's hometown of New Orleans.

Ambrose discussed the idea with historian and academic Nick Mueller, then received $50,000 in startup funding from Peter Kalikow, a real estate developer and then-owner of the New York Post. Congress later appropriated $4 million for the museum. In 1998, it was announced that the museum would extend its scope to the entirety of D-Day. The change was helped by the 1998 film Saving Private Ryan, which caused renewed interest in the project.

The museum had previously been planned to open in 1994, before being delayed several times. The museum was officially dedicated as the National D-Day Museum on June 6, 2000, the 56th anniversary of the landings. It was located in the former Weckerling Brewery building, which was built in 1888. The brewery was designed by William Fitzner and closed two years later.

In 2003, the United States Congress passed a law designating the museum as the official national World War II Museum. However, the name was not officially changed to the National World War II Museum until 2006 due to Hurricane Katrina. In 2007, the museum announced its first expansion, which included the additions of the Solomon Victory Theater, Stage Door Canteen, and American Sector. All three later opened in 2009, and the John E. Kushner Restoration Pavilion opened in 2011.

In 2013, the museum opened the expansion known as the US Freedom Pavilion: The Boeing Center. The Boeing Center was followed by two other expansions, the Campaigns of Courage Pavilion, which opened in 2014, and the Campaigns of Courage Pavilion, Road to Tokyo, which opened the following year. The final expansion project, known as the Liberation Pavilion began construction in 2018. However, due to delays, it did not open until 2023. The pavilion was paid for with a $15 million donation from the Boeing Company and with a $20 million grant from the US Department of Defense with congressional approval.

== Design ==
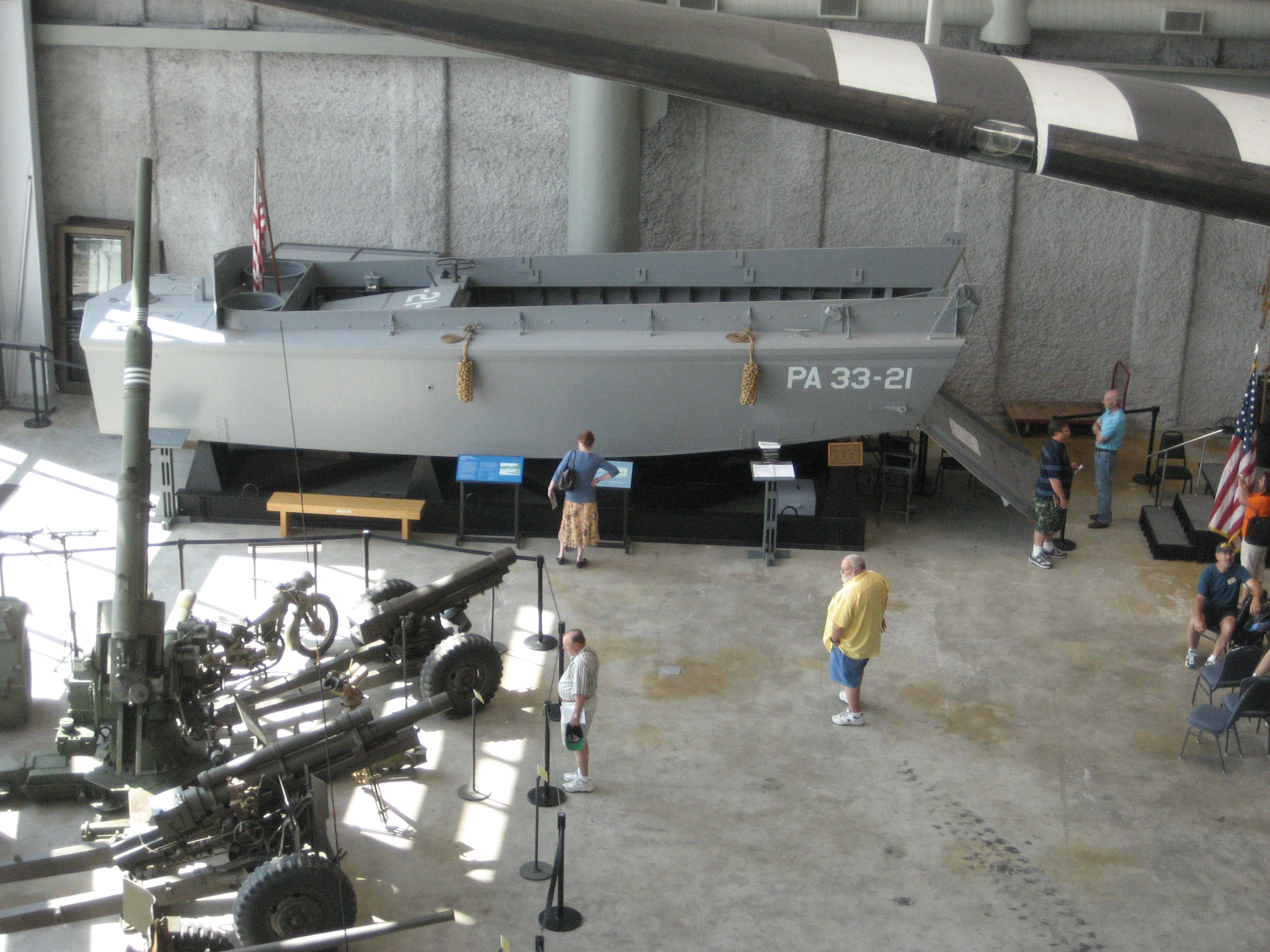
Artillery and a Higgins boat on display in the lobby

Upon arriving, visitors are encouraged to board a "train," a simulation exhibit that mimics the experience of soldiers going off to war. The original building is known as the Louisiana Memorial Pavilion. Several aircraft are displayed in the large atrium, including a Supermarine Spitfire and a Douglas C-47 Skytrain suspended from the ceiling. A Higgins boat is also usually on display in this pavilion. The exhibits in this pavilion focus on the amphibious landings in the European theater of the war and on the contributions of the home front.

The Louisiana Memorial Pavilion is also used for temporary exhibits, such as the homefront-centered The Arsenal of Democracy exhibit opened in June 2017. It also holds a train car, part of the "Dog Tag Experience" interactive exhibit opened in 2013. This part of the museum includes several permanent galleries, including the Home Front, Planning for D-Day, and the D-Day Beaches. The third floor of the pavilion has an observation deck for closer viewing of the hanging aircraft. It has a second gallery exploring the amphibious invasions of the Pacific War.

The museum's largest building, US Freedom Pavilion: The Boeing Center, holds a B-17E Flying Fortress bomber, B-25J Mitchell bomber, SBD-3 Dauntless, TBF Avenger, P-51D Mustang, Corsair F4U-4, and an interactive submarine experience based on the final mission of the USS Tang. The B-17E is My Gal Sal, lost over Greenland and recovered 53 years later. The 32,000-square-foot Campaigns of Courage Pavilion includes the Road to Berlin exhibit about the European theater of war, opened in December 2014, and the Road to Tokyo exhibit about the Pacific campaign, opened in 2015. A Messerschmitt Bf 109 hangs in the building.

The Liberation Pavilion aims to explore the "joys, costs, and meaning of liberation and freedom" and how World War II affects us today. Visitors may collect a dog tag upon entering the museum; touching it to screens within various exhibits shows information about the experience of the person named on the tag. Such exhibits include The D-Day Invasion of Normandy, and the U.S. Merchant Marine Gallery. A 4-D film, Beyond All Boundaries, shown in the Solomon Victory Theater, gives an overview of the war.

== Gallery ==
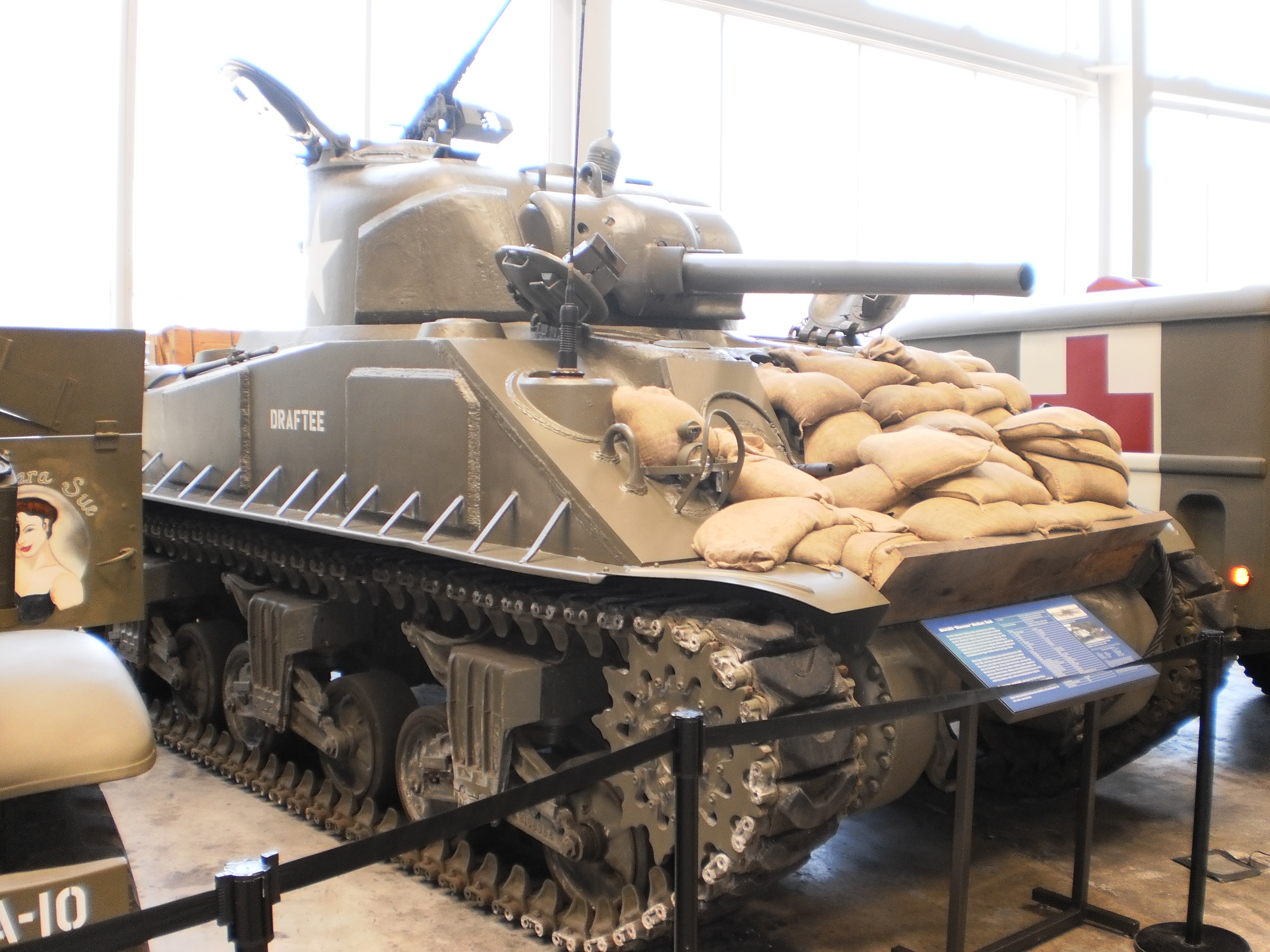
Sherman tank

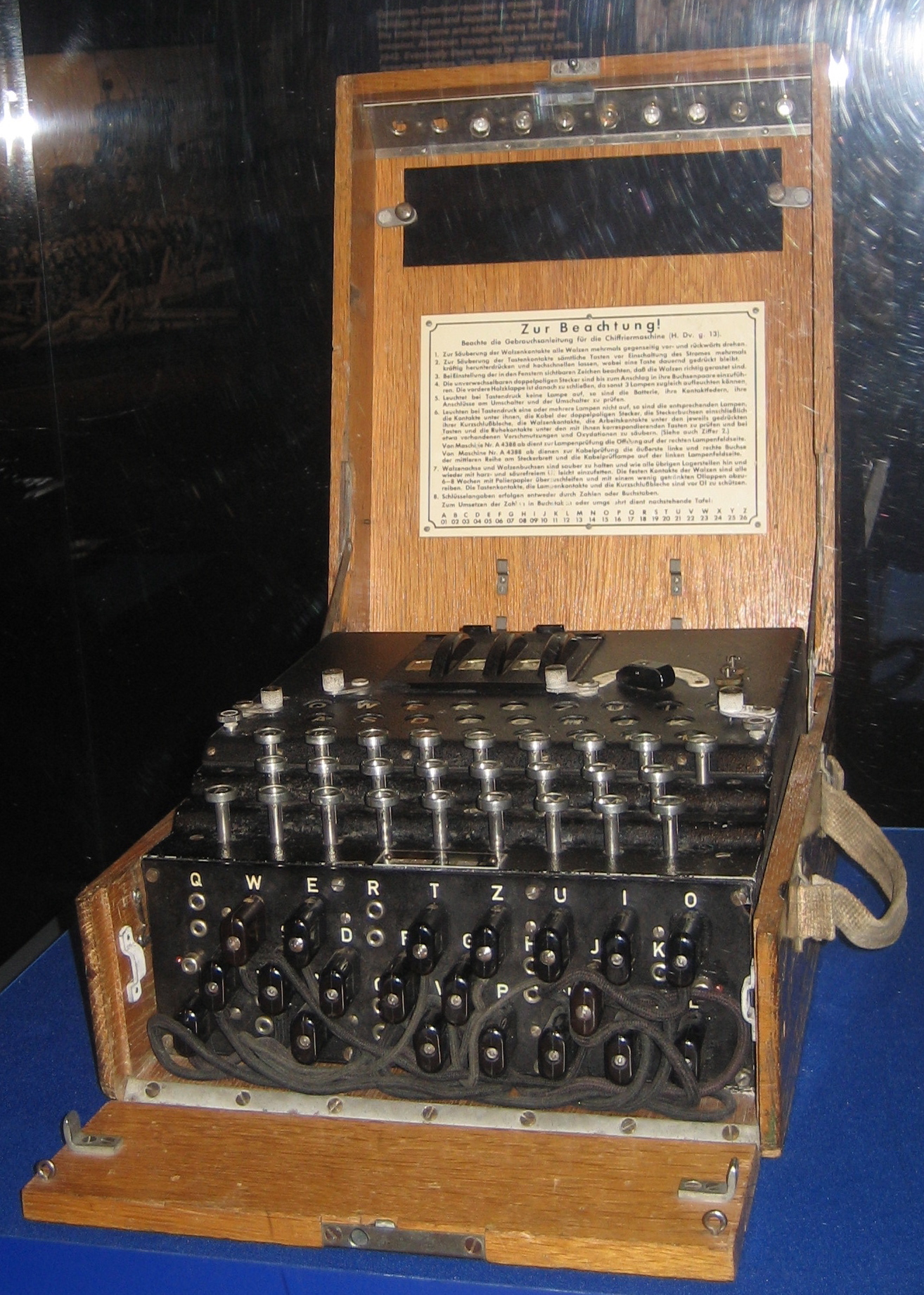
Enigma machine on display

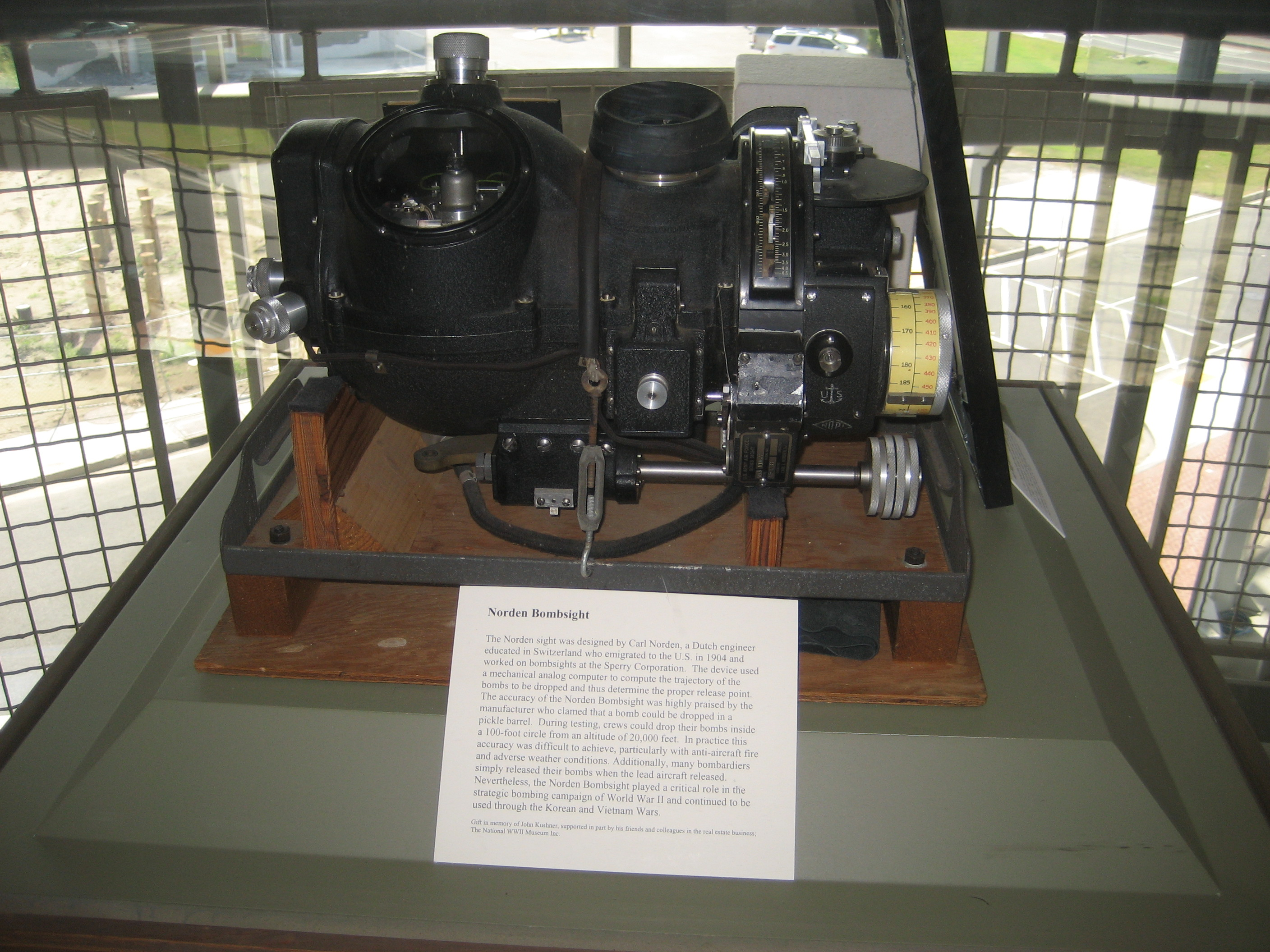
Norden bombsight on display

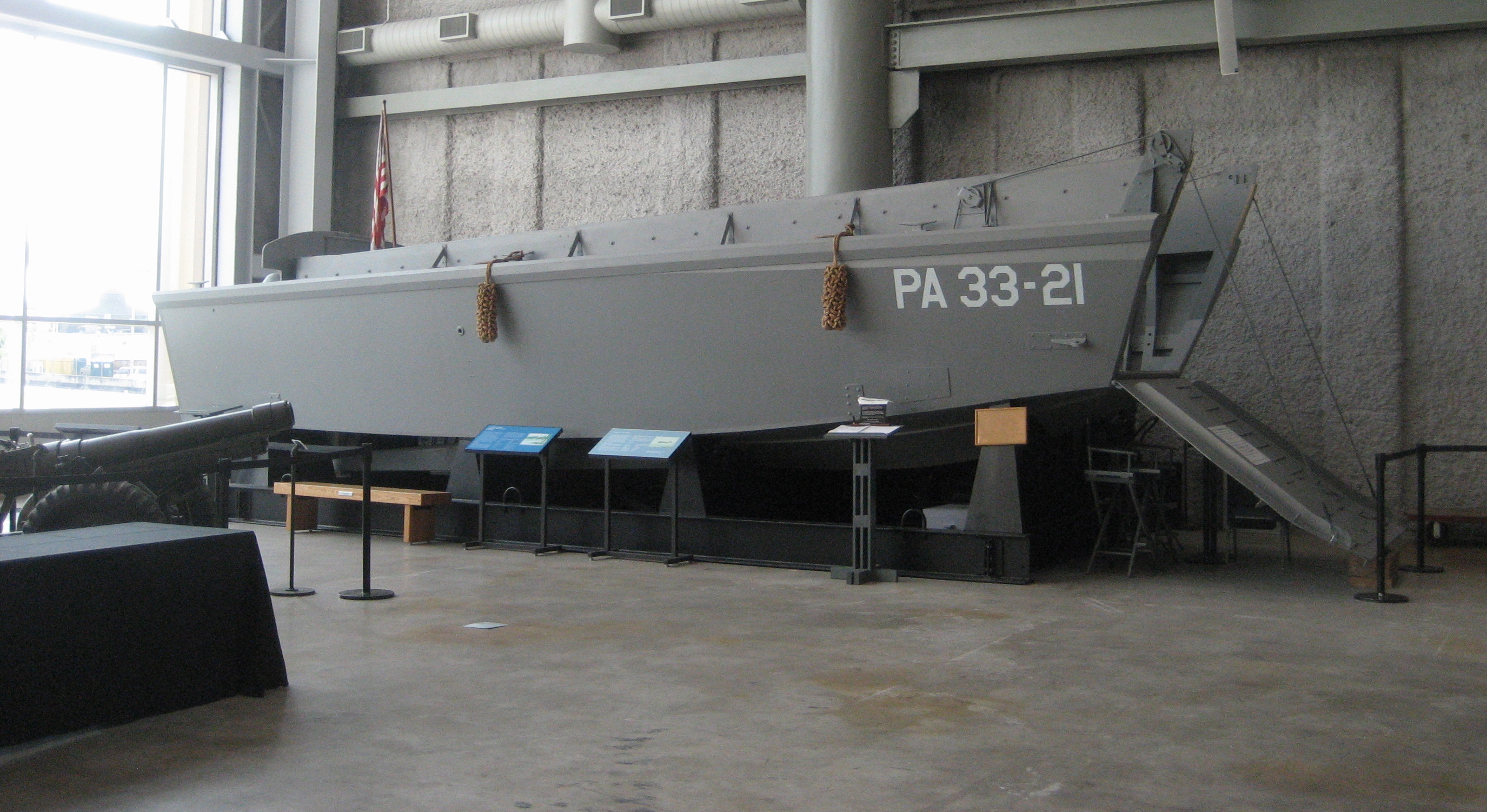
Higgins boat (LCVP) display

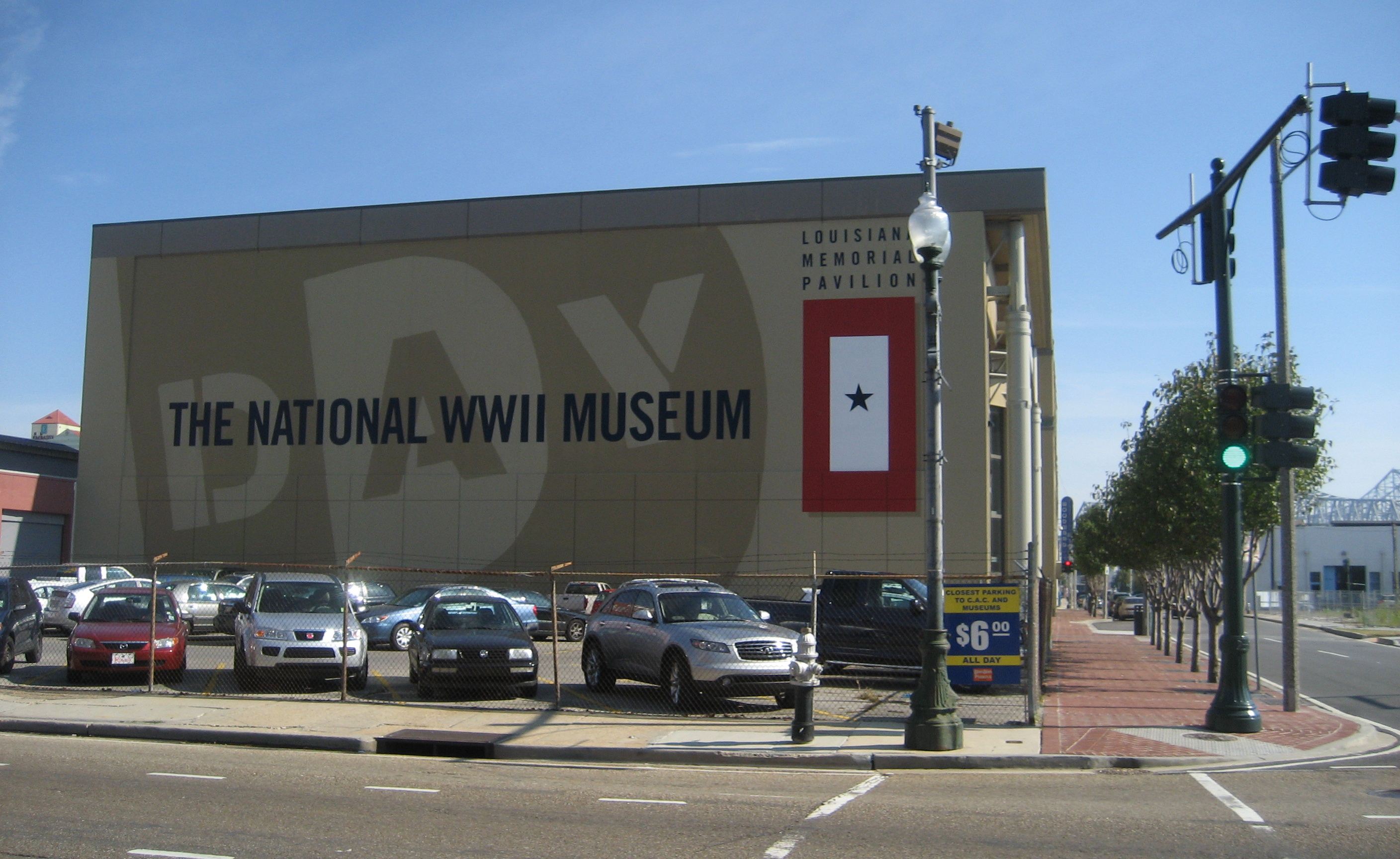
The Louisiana Memorial Pavilion as seen from Camp St. at Andrew Higgins Dr.

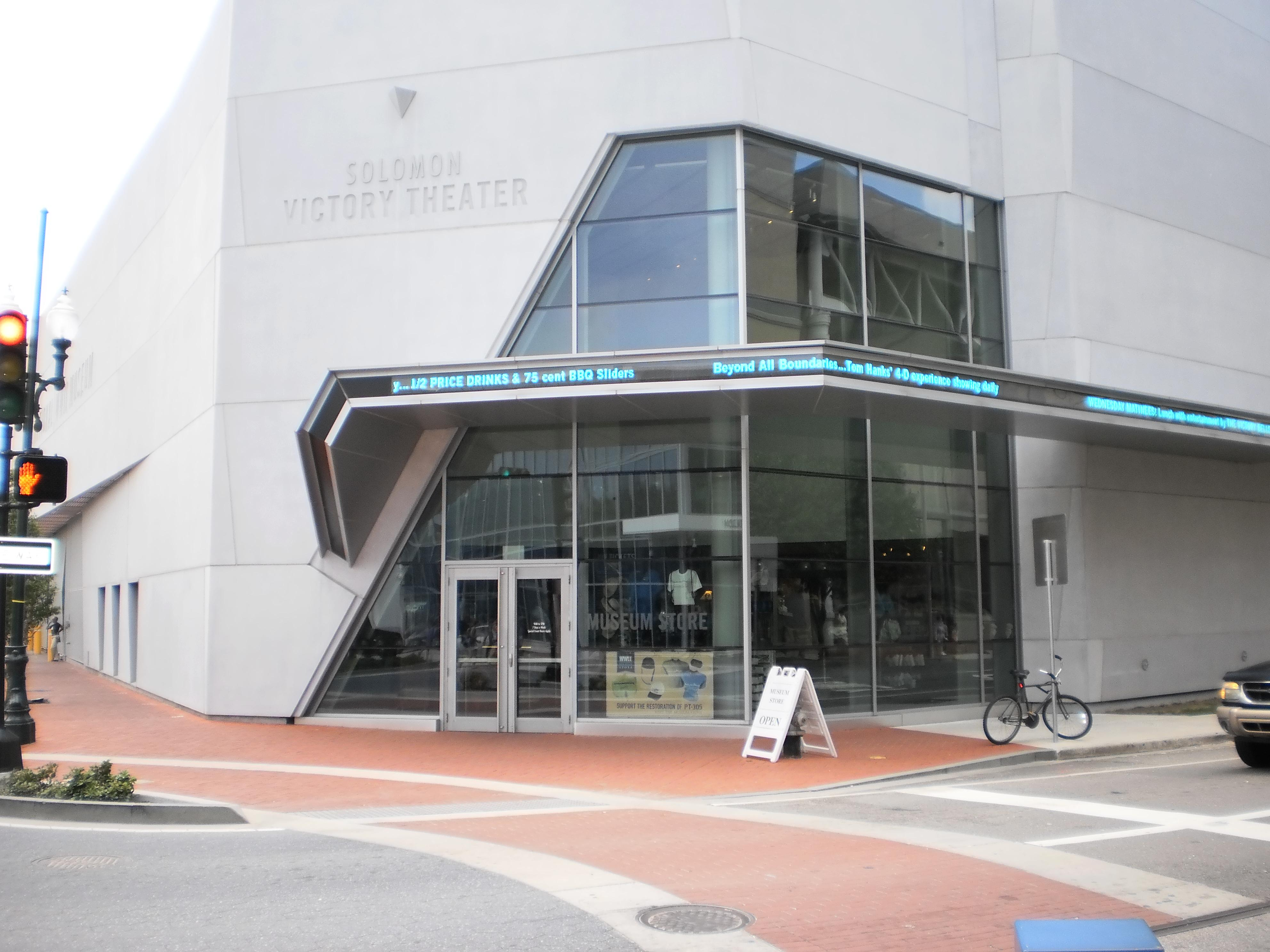
Entrance to the Solomon Victory Theatre

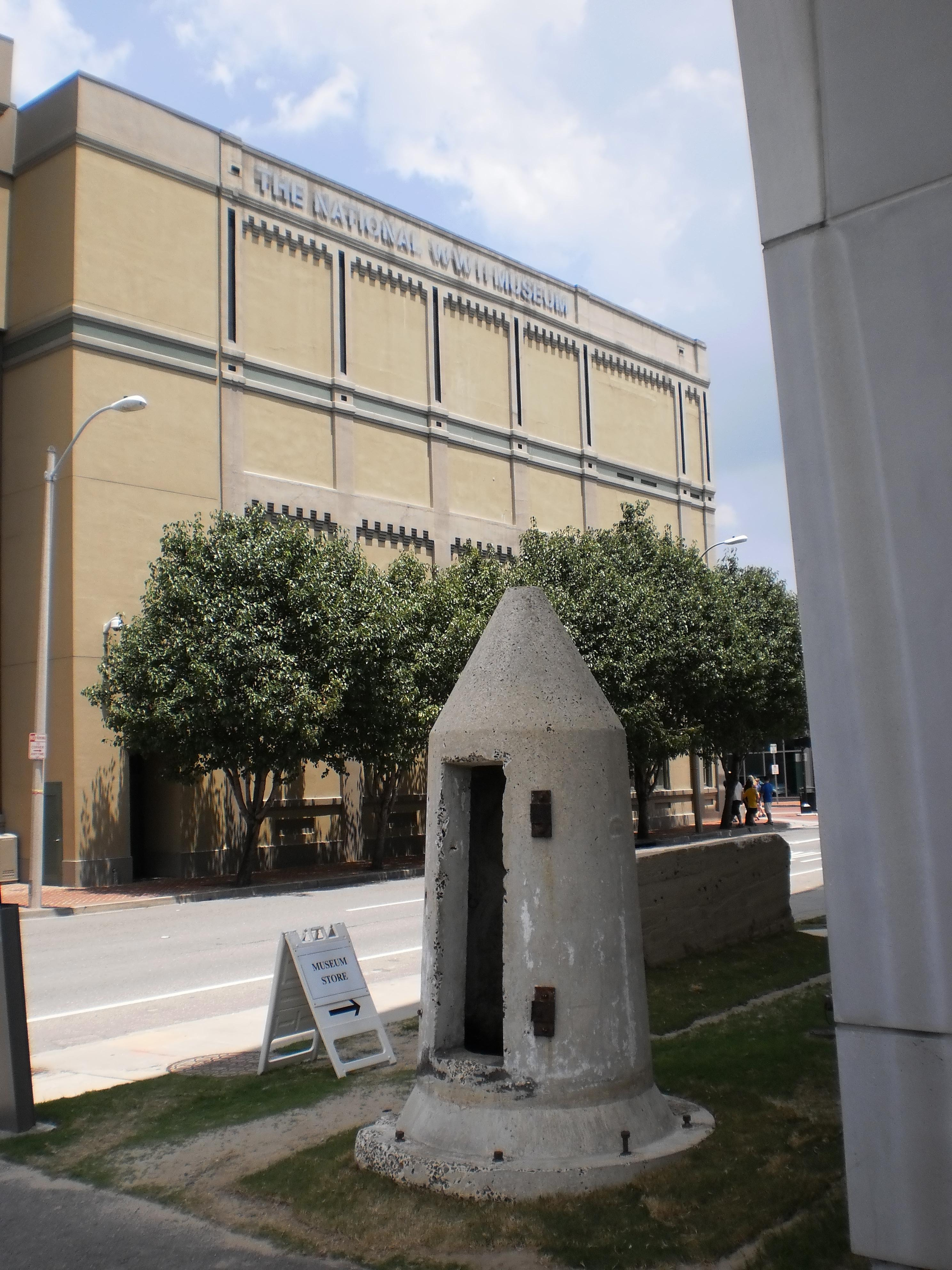
Air raid shelter in front of museum

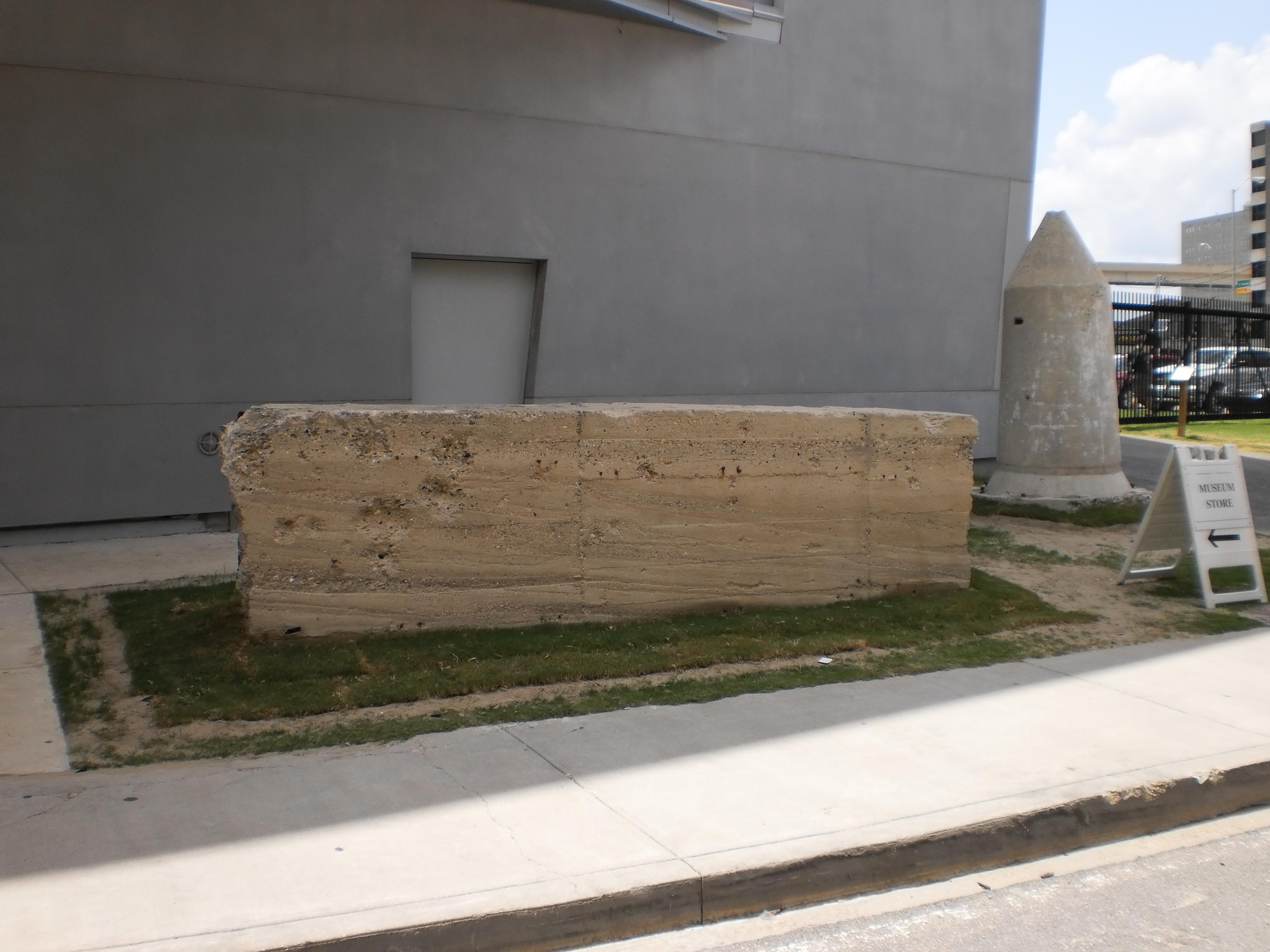
Portion of the Atlantic Wall on the museum's campus

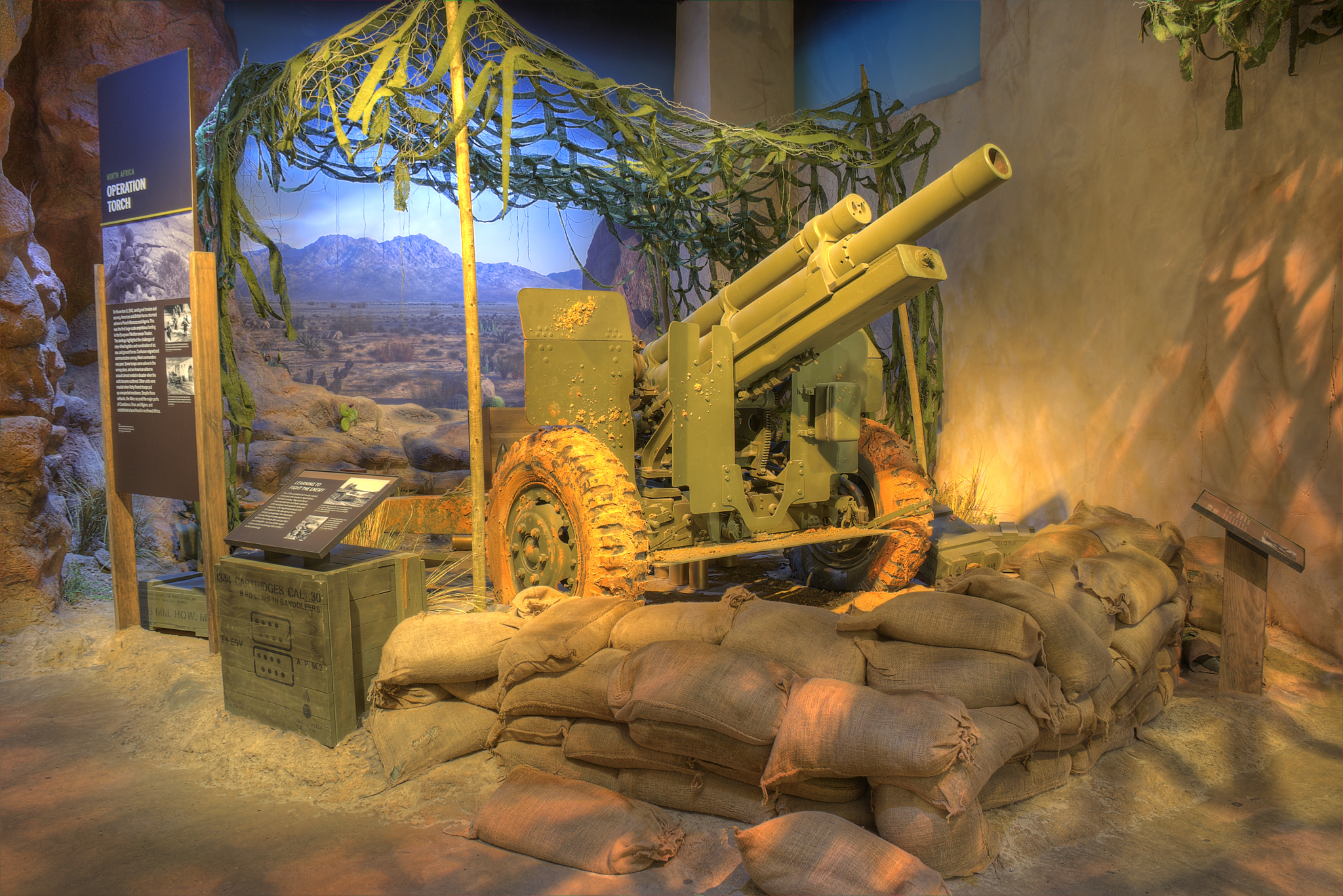
M2A1 display

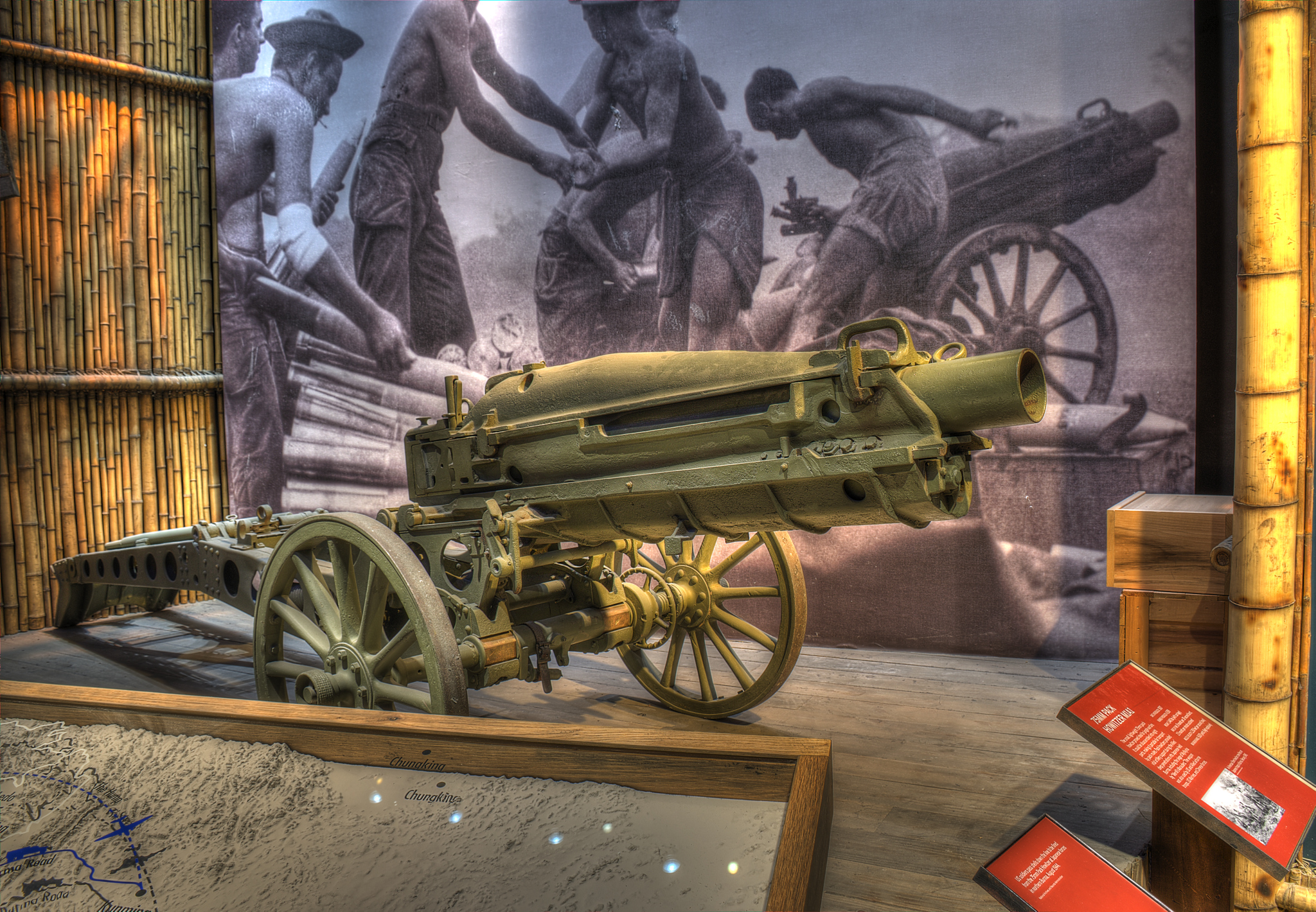
75 mm pack howitzer M1A1

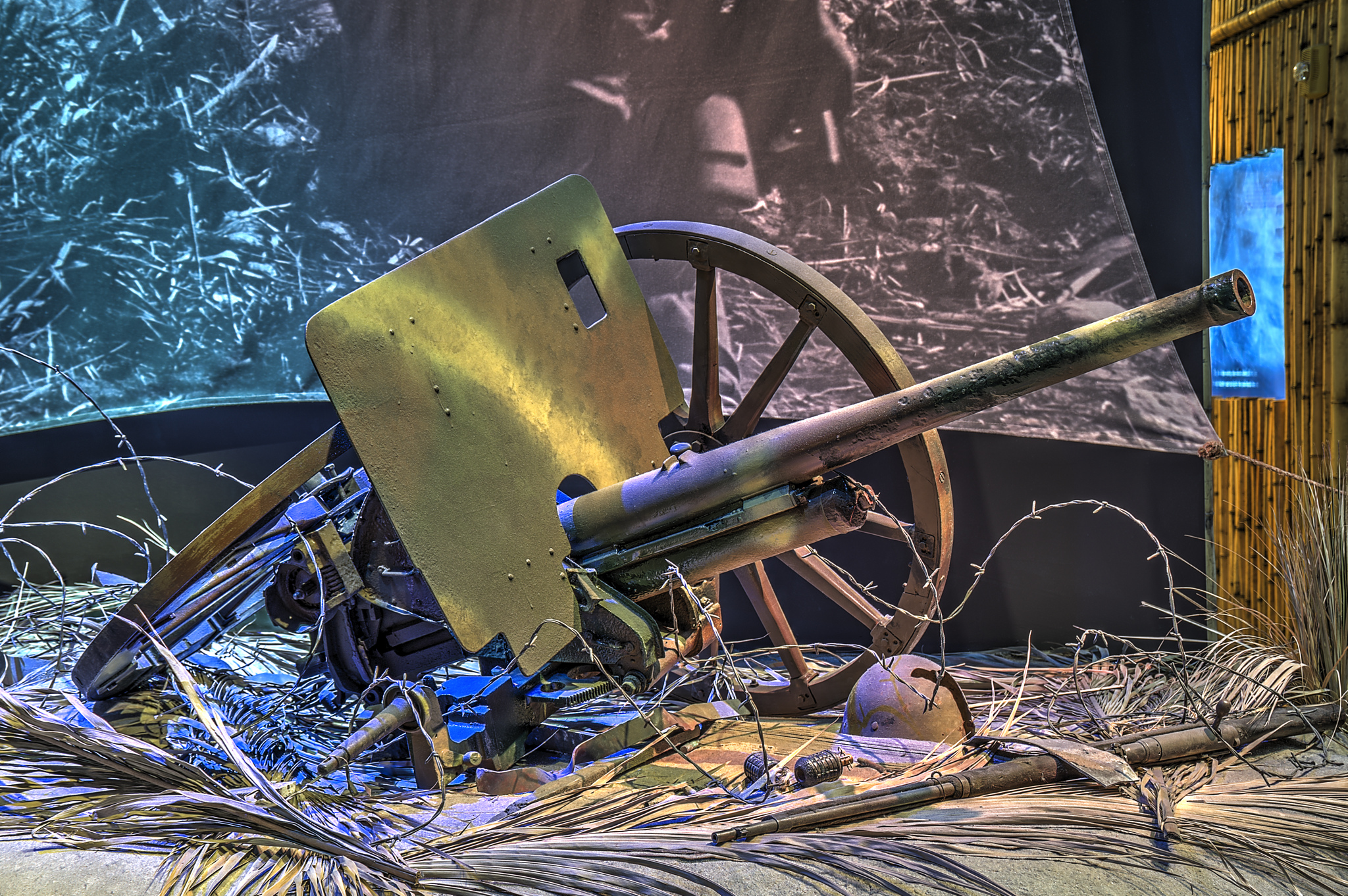
Type 94 37 mm anti-tank gun

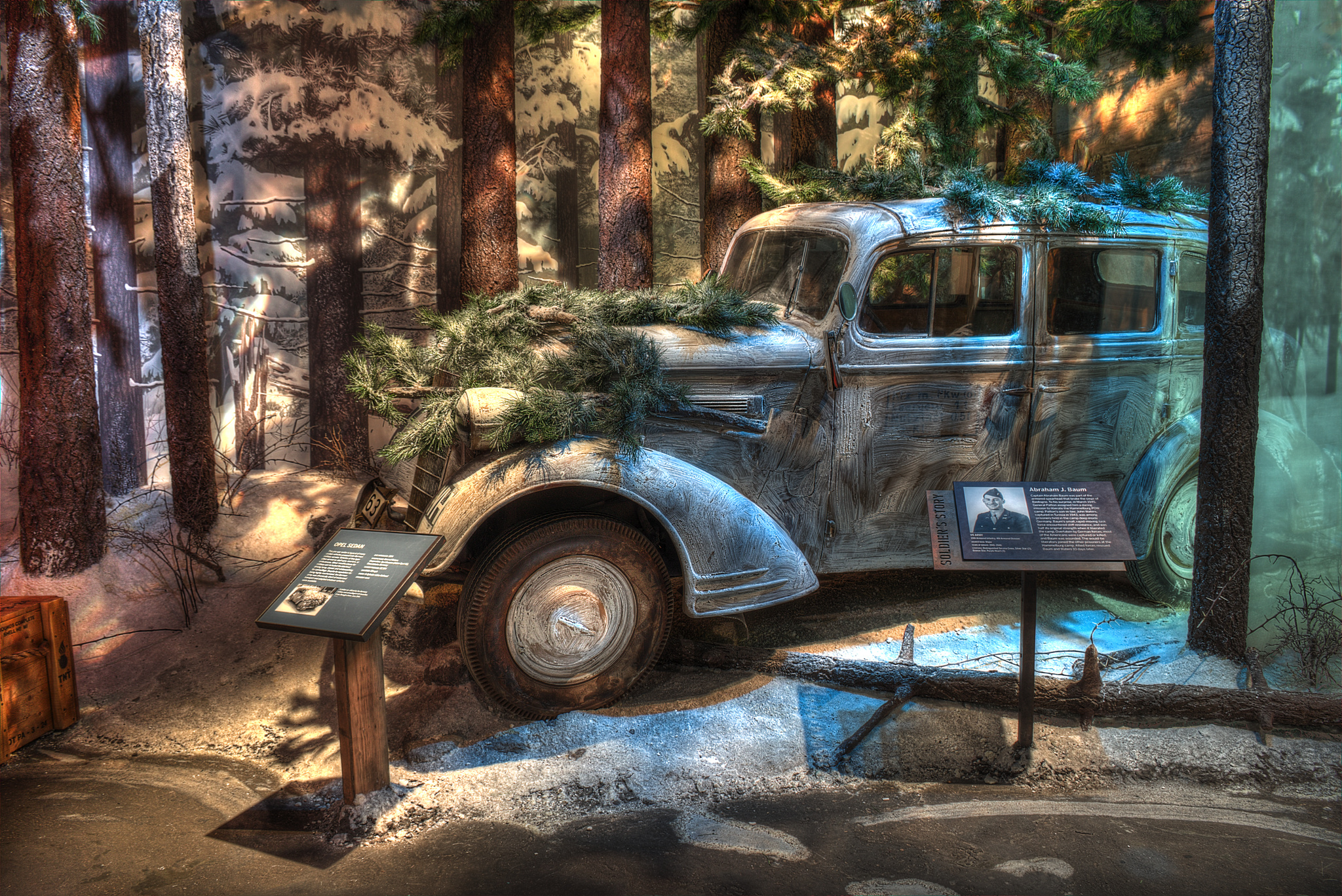
1934 Opel sedan in winter camouflage

=== Airplanes ===
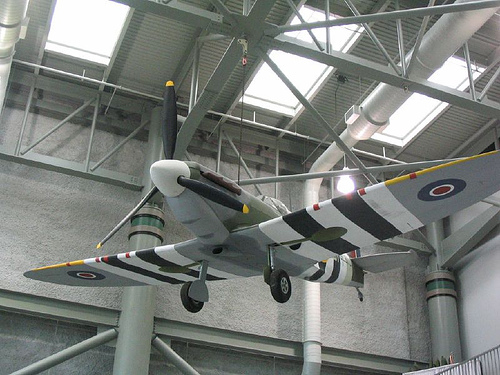
Supermarine Spitfire

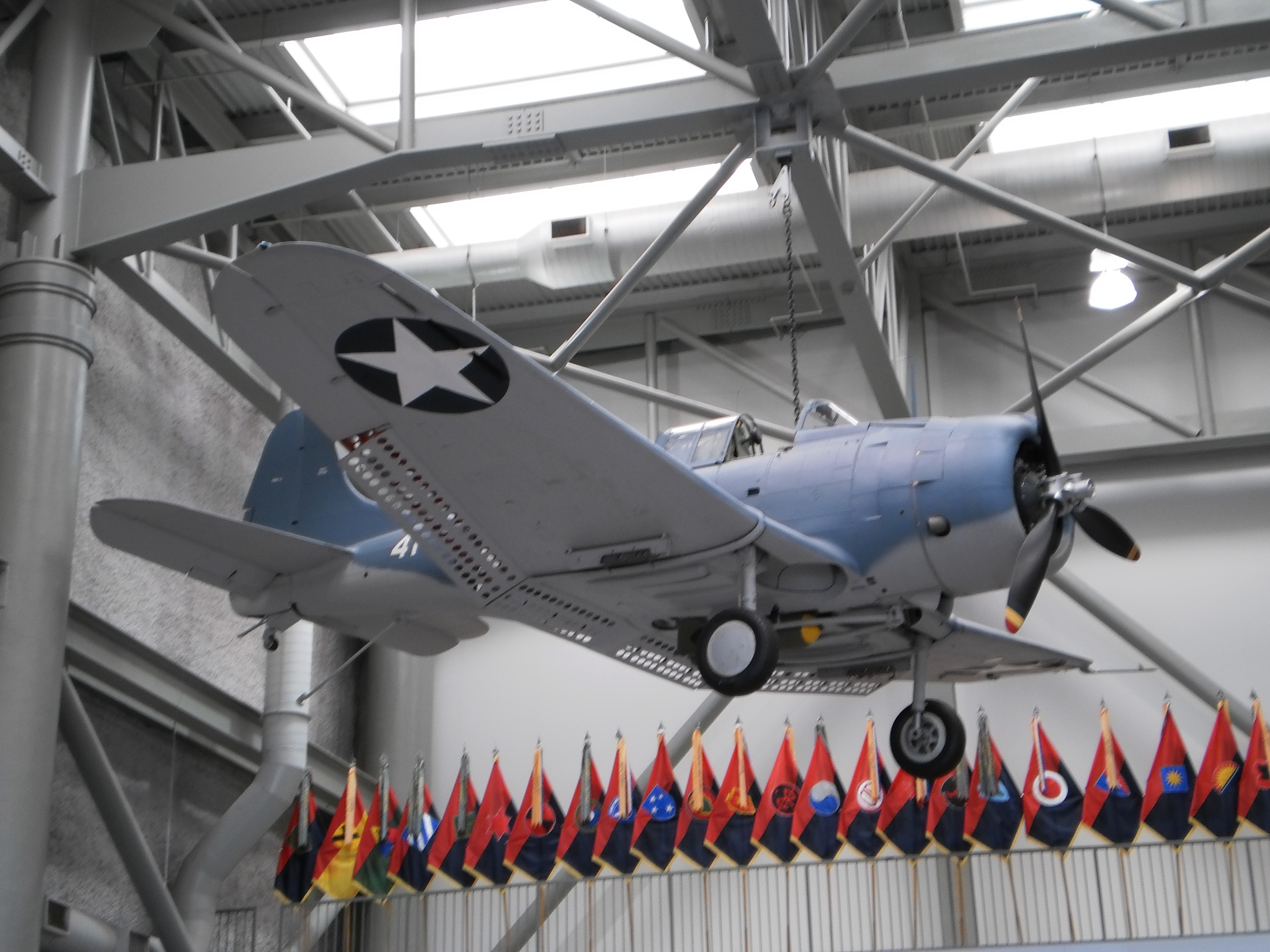
SBD Dauntless dive bomber

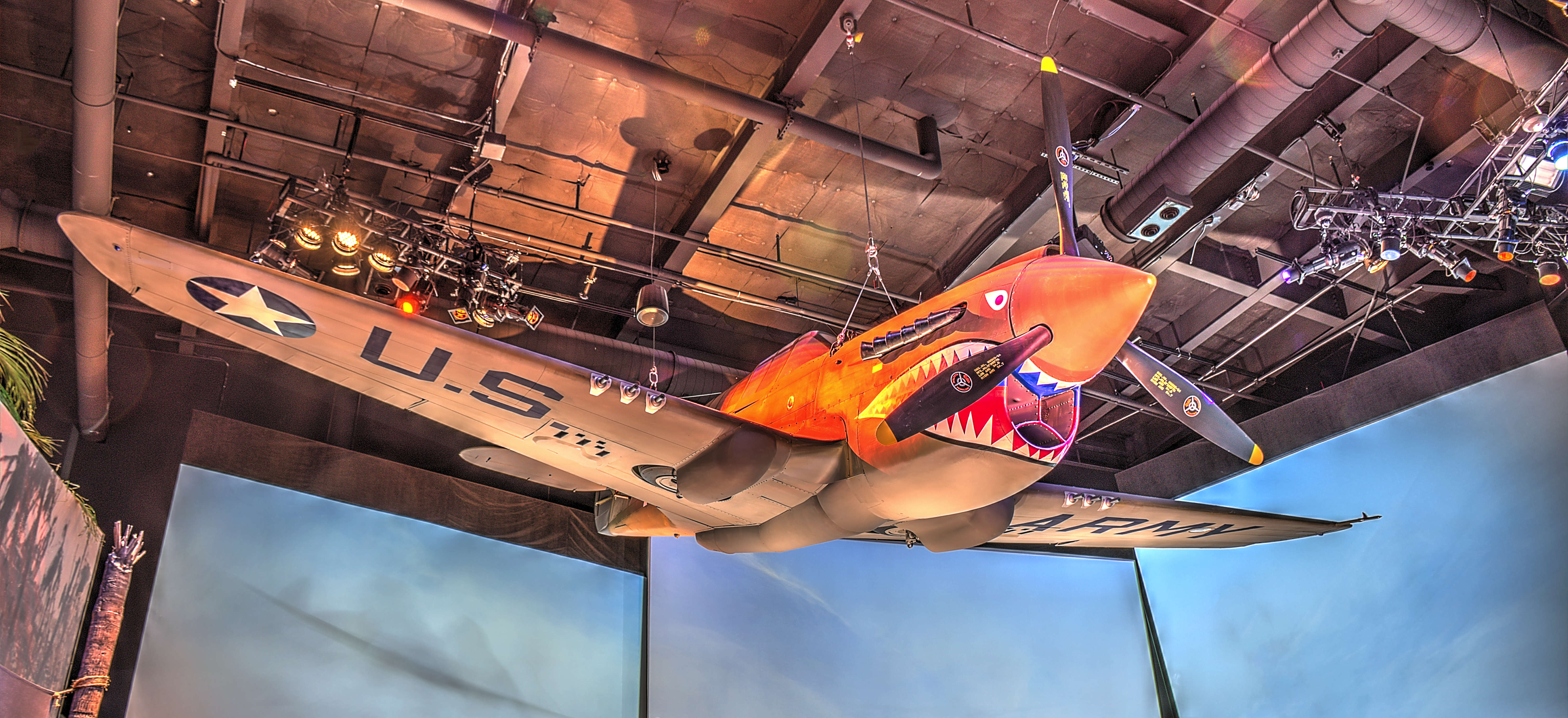
Curtiss P-40 Warhawk

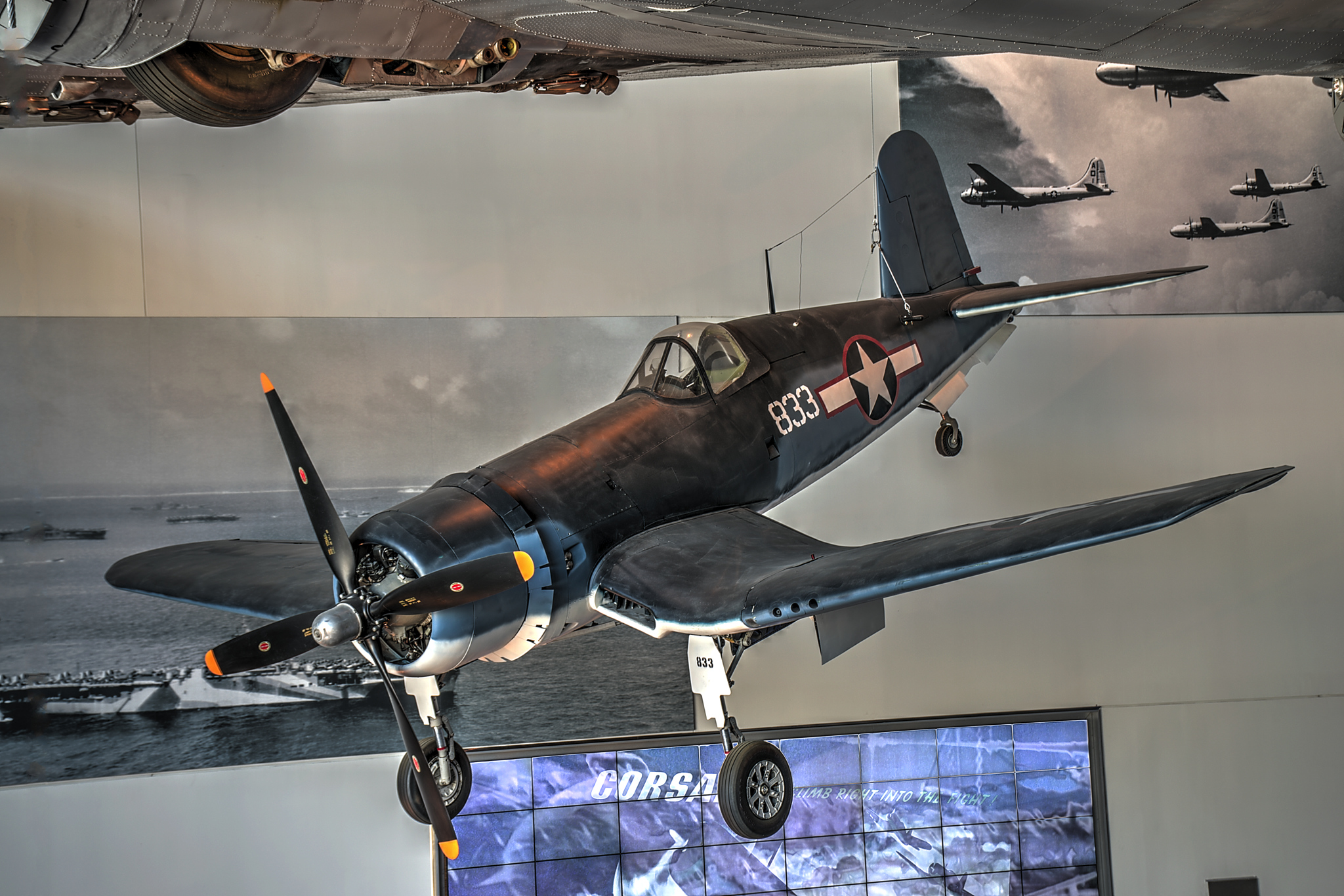
Vought F4U Corsair

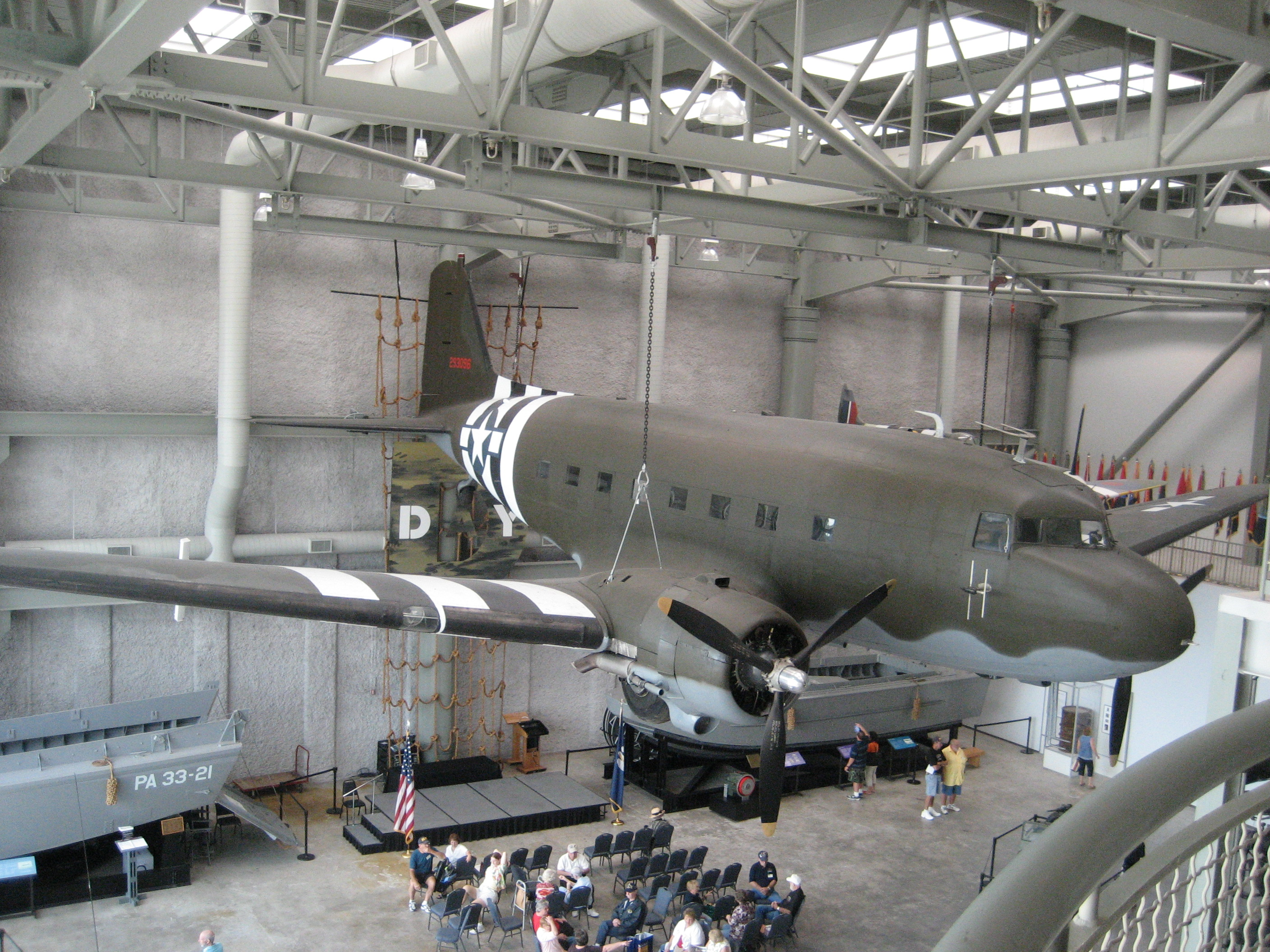
A C-47 on display in the museum atrium

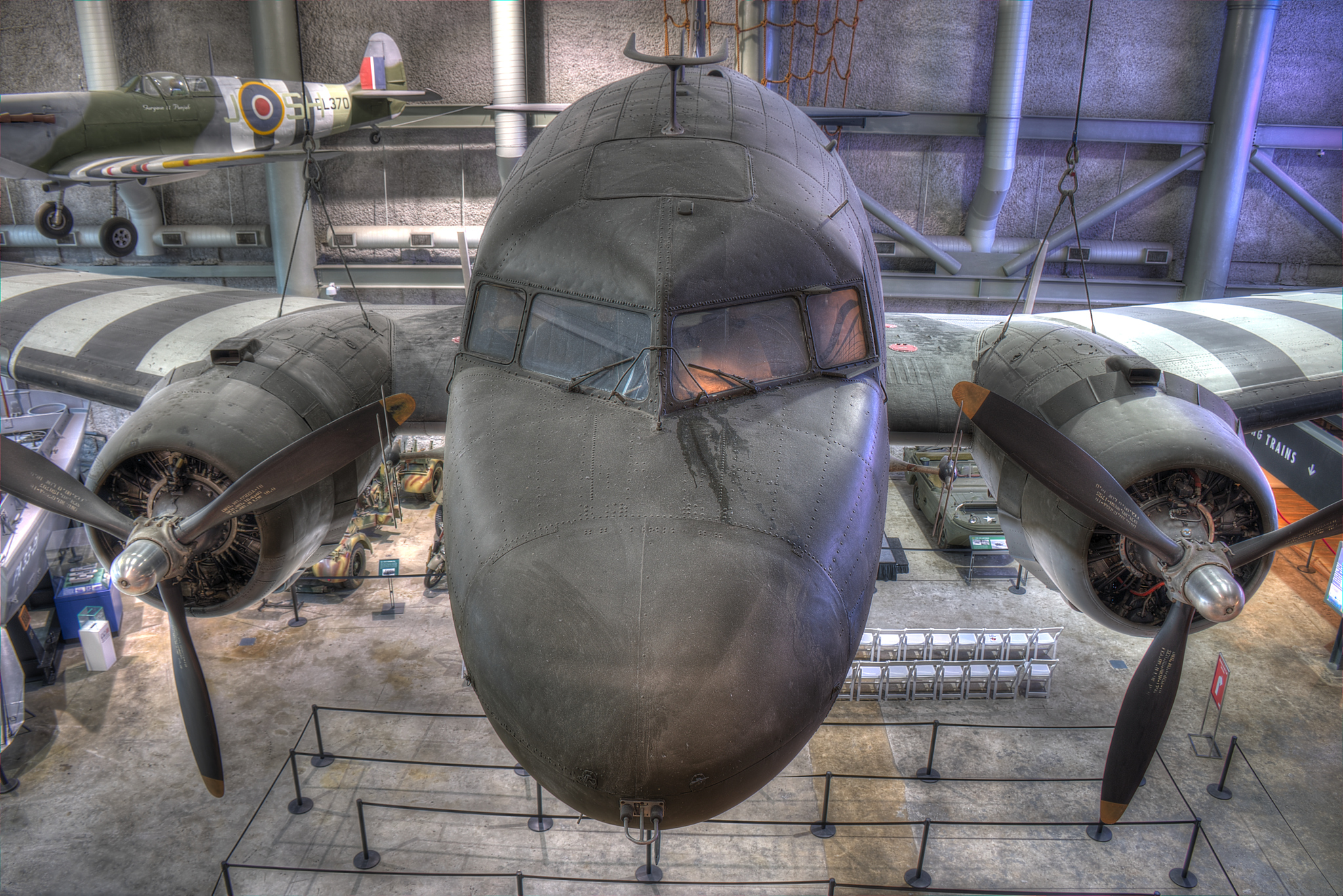
detail of C-47

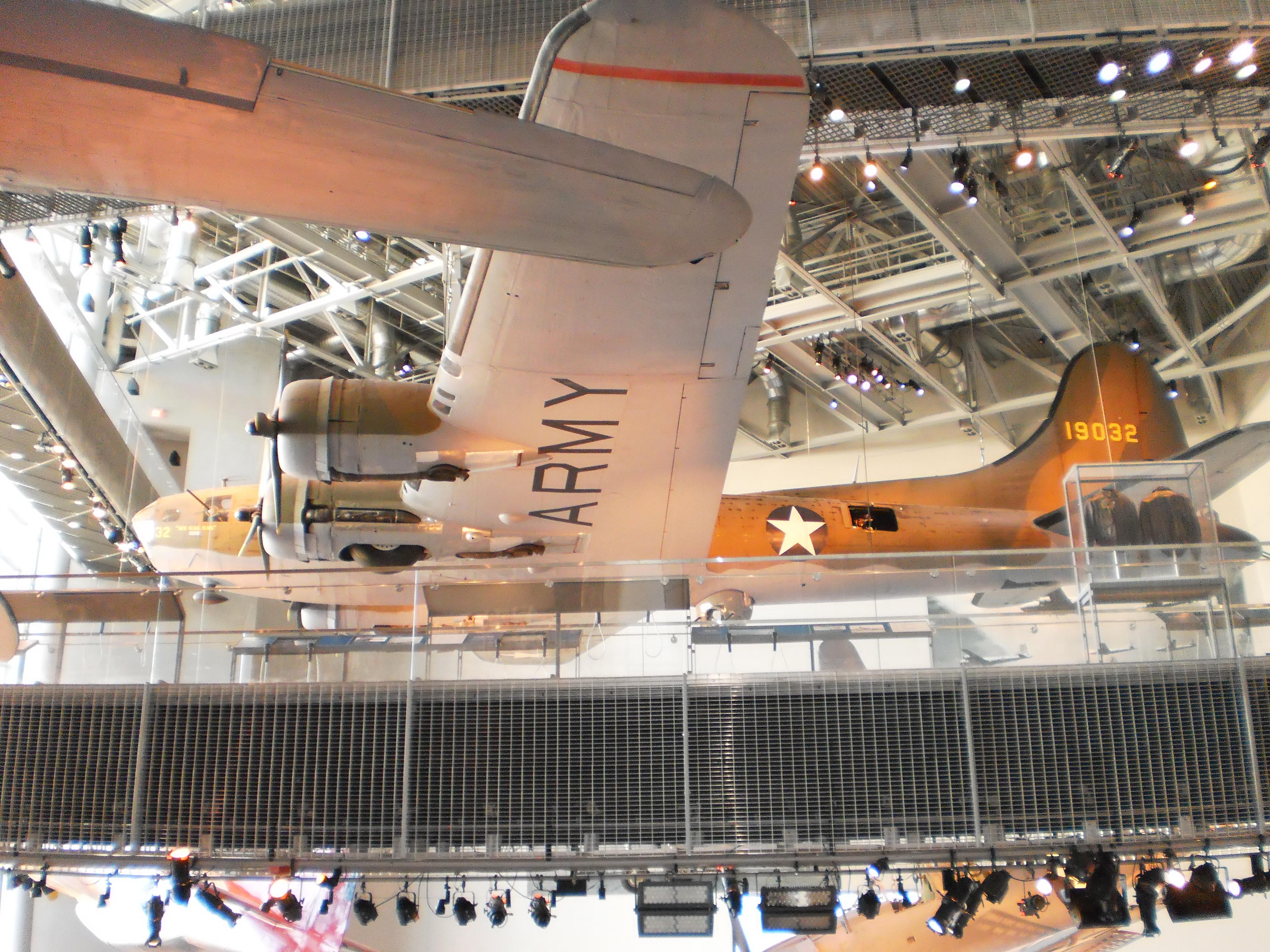
B-17 in the US Freedom Pavilion: The Boeing Center

== See also ==
- American Heritage Museum – Stow, Massachusetts
- Imperial War Museum – London, England
- The International Museum of World War II – Natick, Massachusetts (closed in September 2019)
- Marine Corps War Memorial – Arlington County, Virginia
- Museum of La Coupole – German-built V-2 launch site in Pas-de-Calais, France
- Museum of the War of Chinese People's Resistance Against Japanese Aggression – Beijing, China
- Museum of the Great Patriotic War, Moscow – Poklonnaya Gora, Moscow, Russia
- Museum of the Second World War – Gdańsk, Poland
- National D-Day Memorial – Bedford, Virginia
- National Museum of the History of Ukraine in the Second World War – Kyiv, Ukraine
- National Museum of the Pacific War – in home of Fleet Admiral Chester Nimitz in Fredericksburg, Texas
- National World War I Museum and Memorial – Kansas City, Missouri
- United States Holocaust Memorial Museum – National Mall, Washington, DC
- World War II Memorial – National Mall, Washington, DC
- Mémorial de Caen – Normandy, France
