= Gordon H. Mueller =

American historian, university administrator

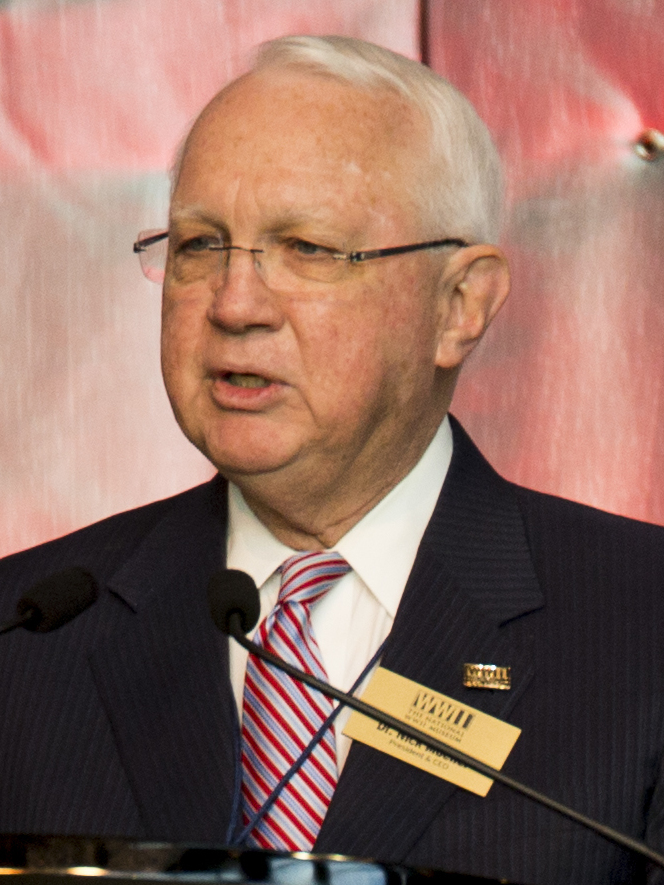
- Mueller in 2014
- Born: 1940 (age 85–86); Philadelphia
- Occupations: historian, university administrator, professor
- Known for: Founder of the National WWII Museum

Academic background
- Education: University of Vienna, University of North Carolina, Stetson University

Academic work
- Discipline: History
- Institutions: University of New Orleans
- Main interests: President and CEO Emeritus of The National WWII Museum

Gordon H. “Nick” Mueller (born 1940 Philadelphia) is an American historian and founding President and CEO Emeritus of The National WWII Museum in New Orleans, Louisiana. He is the emeritus Vice Chancellor at the University of New Orleans.

== Career ==
=== Education and academic career ===
Dr. Mueller earned his bachelor’s degree at Stetson University, an MA and PhD at the University of North Carolina Chapel Hill, and has done postgraduate work at Yale, Harvard, and semesters at Universities of Vienna and Zurich. He is a recipient of the Legion of Honor from the Republic of France, the Grand Cross of Honor from the Republic of Austria and was awarded Honorary Doctorate degrees from Stetson University and the University of New Orleans. He was a professor of European History at the University of New Orleans. He served as Vice Chancellor at the University of New Orleans from 1986 to 1992.

In 1999, he was inducted into the International Adult and Continuing Education (IACE) Hall of Fame.

=== National World War II Museum ===
He is credited, along with Stephen E. Ambrose, with starting the National WWII Museum, located in New Orleans, in 2000. Mueller served as President of the museum until 2017. A few years after its founding, the museum gained US Congressional support, and an affiliation with the Smithsonian Institution. He was the closest friend of Stephen Ambrose.

== Selected publications ==
- Mueller, Gordon H. (2019), Everything We Have: D-Day 6. 6.44: the American story of the Normandy landings told through personal accounts, images and artifacts from the collections of The National WWII Museum, London: Andre Deutsch, ISBN 978-0233005812, OCLC 1055680073
