= William Fitzner =

German-American architect

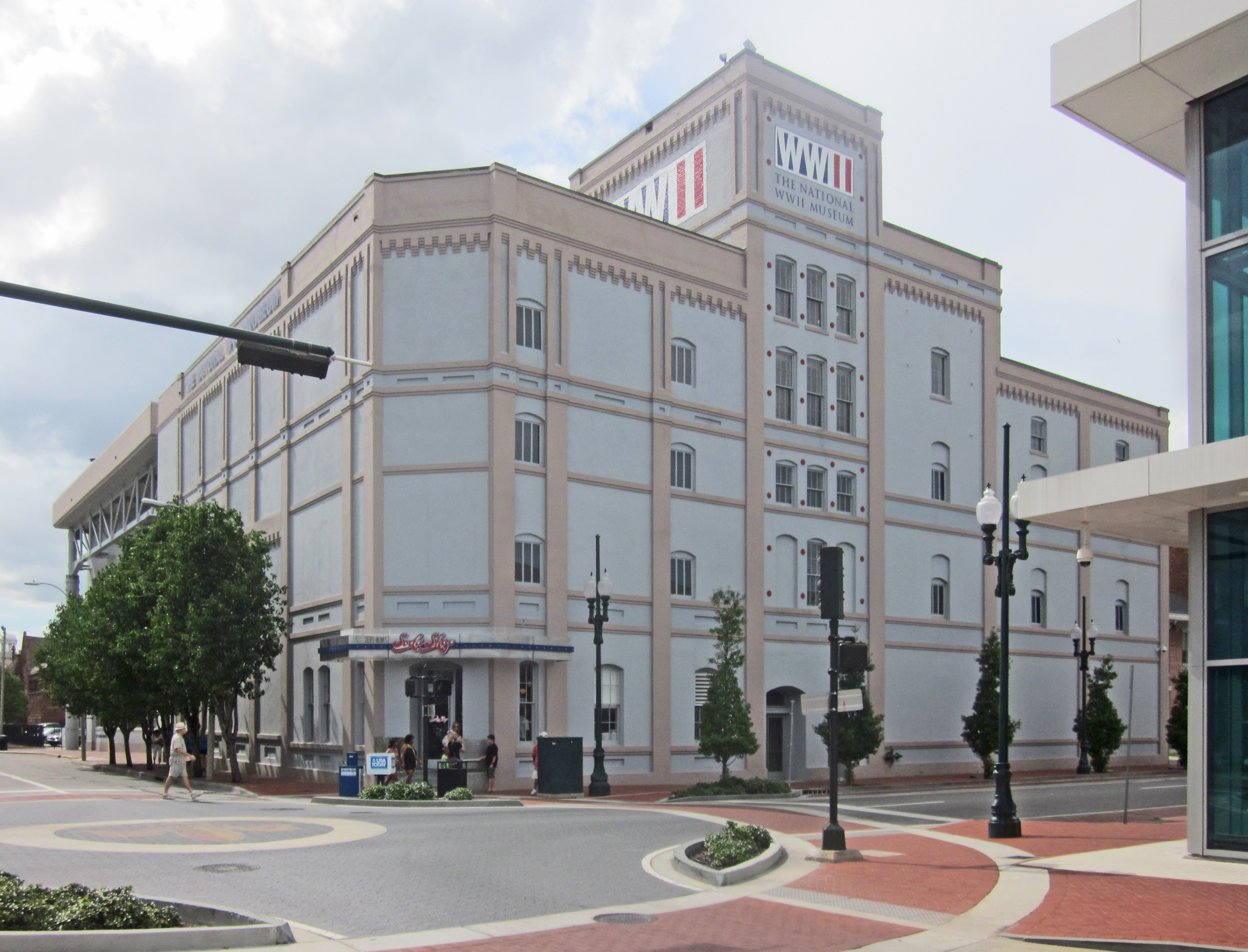
The former Weckerling Brewery in New Orleans, designed by Fitzner in 1888, now part of the National World War II Museum.

William Fitzner (Schoenlanke, Posen, Kingdom of Prussia, 1845 – 17 August 1914, New Orleans, Louisiana, US), was a German-American architect who practiced in New Orleans, Louisiana, between the 1850s and his death. He was one of the most prolific designers in the city during the late nineteenth century and a major contributor to the city's expansion in the decades after the American Civil War.

== Career ==
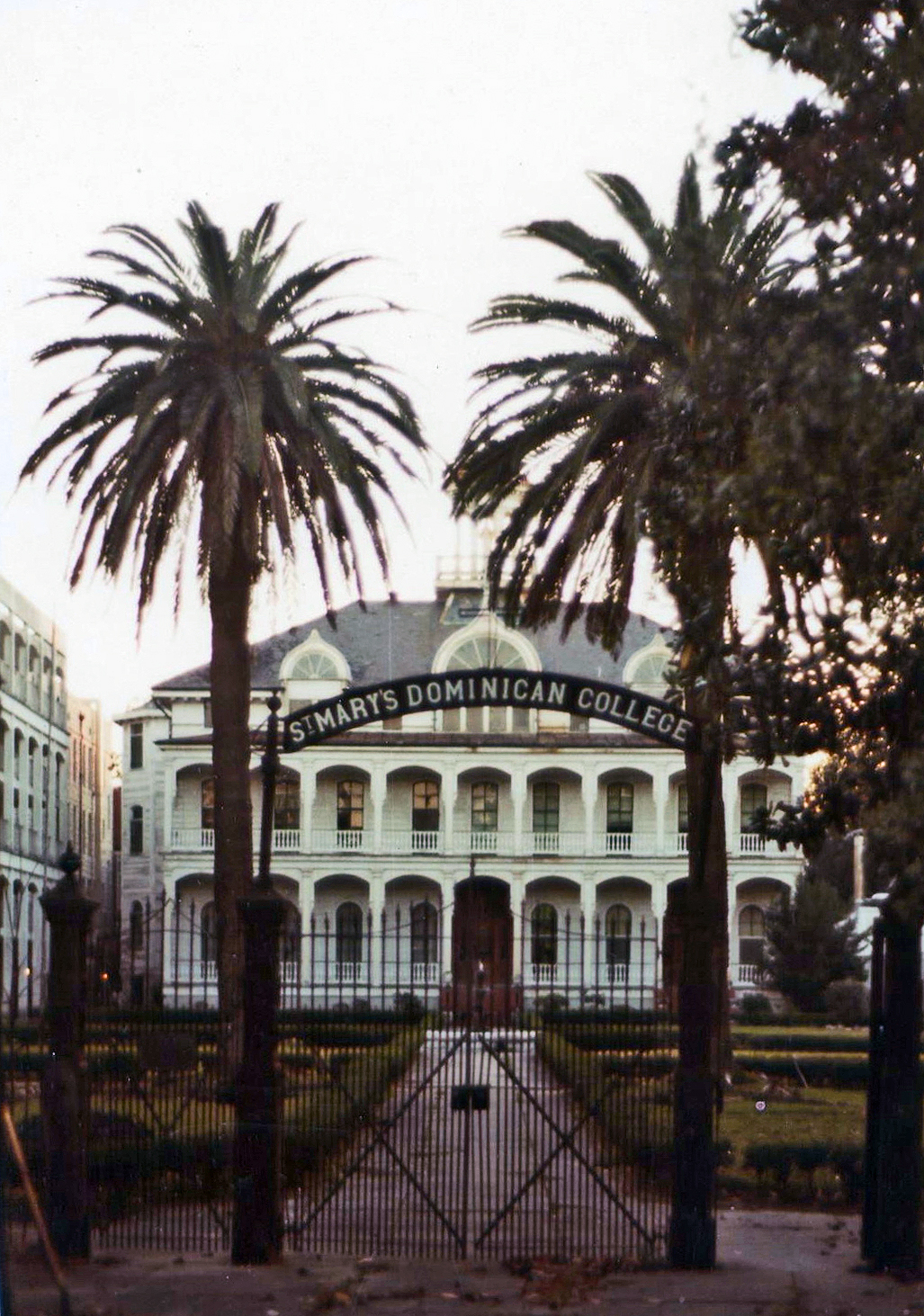
The former St. Mary's Dominican Convent, built in 1882, now part of Loyola University New Orleans.

Fitzner was born in Prussia in 1845 in the Grand Duchy of Posen, an area east of Berlin that is now part of Poland. He immigrated to New Orleans in 1859 at the age of 14 when his sister Emilie married Charles Hillger, also a German-born architect who would make a solid reputation in New Orleans before his early death. Hillger lived in the Little Saxony district and had formed a partnership with William Drews and his brother Gustave, a grocer-carpenter. The three lived there in the same house with their families until Hillger's marriage to Fitzner's sister just before the Civil War.

Hillger built a successful practice before and after the Civil War, during which he apparently left New Orleans, as did Fitzner, though where they each went in the interim remains a matter of conjecture; it has been surmised that Fitzner went to Texas, where another of his sisters, Anna, lived. Fitzner apprenticed with Hillger and worked as a draftsman in the office of the city surveyor, W.H. Bell, in the early 1870s. He finally received his first independent commission in 1868, and became known for his widespread use of the Italianate style, with an exuberance approaching a kind of Baroque revival. He was a favorite architect within the growing German community and outside of it in the closing decades of the nineteenth century, and won commissions for a wide variety of building types.

Most prominently, Fitzner became known for his breweries, a characteristic building type widely associated with German communities throughout the United States, particularly in the Northeast and Midwest in places such as Pittsburgh, Philadelphia, Milwaukee, and Cincinnati. But New Orleans had its own very well-established German community and a bevy of brewing companies which expanded during Reconstruction and the Gilded Age. Fitzner designed and built the Louisiana Brewing Company at Jackson Avenue and Tchoupitoulas Street in 1882, then followed that up with commissions for the Weckerling Brewing Company (1888; now part of the National World War II Museum), Lafayette Brewing Company (1889), and the Standard Brewing Company on Johnson Street in the 1890s. He also designed banks, cotton mills, factories, warehouses, hardware stores, St. Mary's Dominican Convent on St. Charles Avenue near Carrollton, and churches. In 1883 he placed third in the competition to design the buildings for the World's Industrial and Cotton Centennial Exposition, the 1884 – 85 World's Fair, held in Audubon Park; the commission went to the winner, R. M. Torgerson of Meridian, Mississippi.

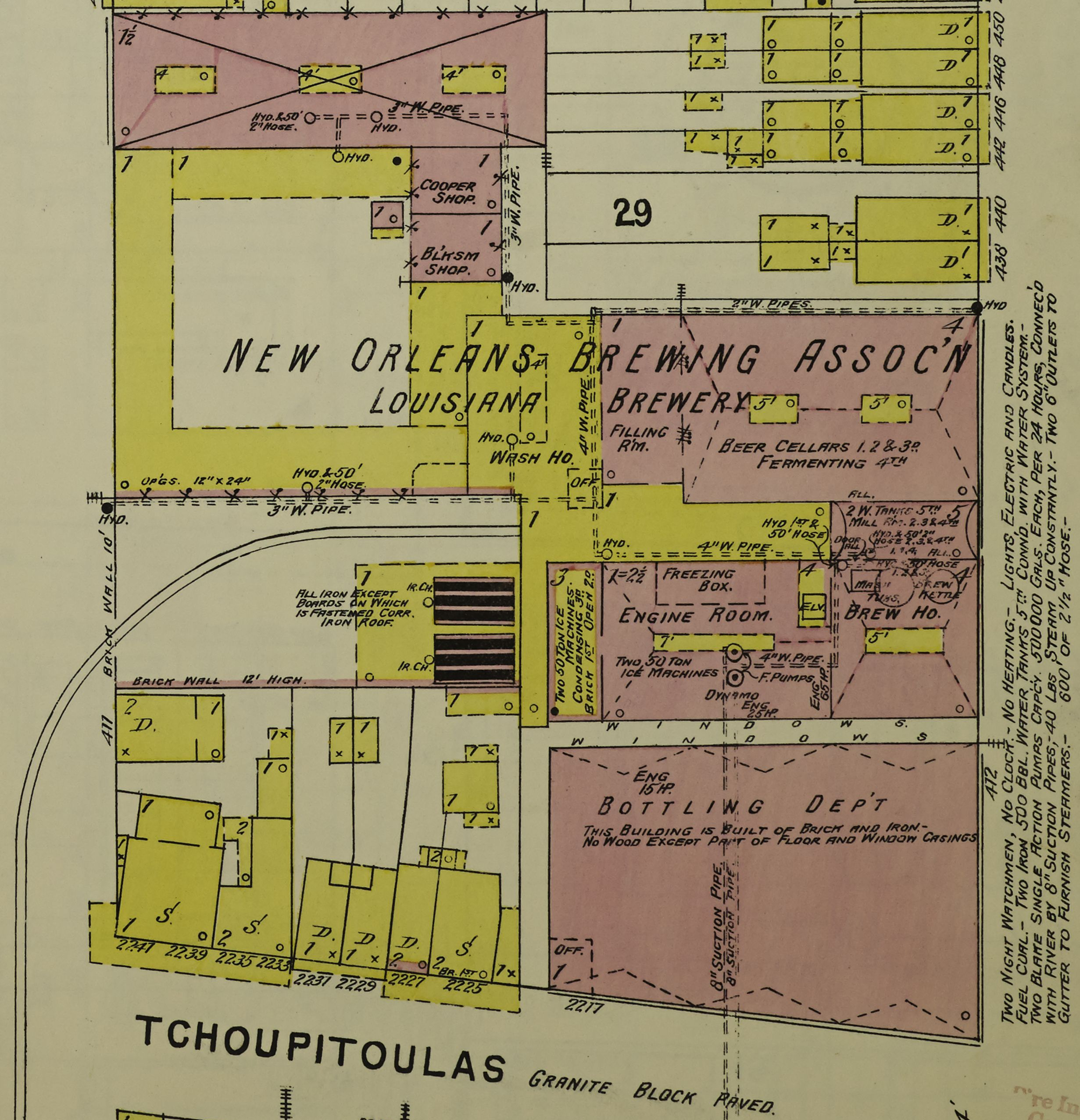
This 1896 Sanborn Fire Insurance map shows the buildings of the Louisiana Brewery Company, whose plant was designed by Fitzner in 1882.

Fitzner also became known for numerous mansions and well-appointed villas for wealthy clients in the Garden District in Uptown New Orleans and elsewhere in the city, many of which have survived and are still used as fashionable private residences, though some have been altered and updated significantly since their construction. He became proficient in a variety of different styles, using, for example, the picturesque Queen Anne aesthetic for the Anders Ugland House at 1335 Calhoun Street in the Blytheville neighborhood in 1896. Fitzner himself, however, lived modestly for over forty years in a shotgun house in the Lafayette City district (now part of the Garden District), just a few blocks from the Hillger-Drews carpentry shop. In 1902, his office was located on the second floor of 215 Carondelet Street in the Central Business District, very close to the Cotton Exchange.

Fitzner was not liked by everyone, however. On a building site on Fulton Street in New Orleans in July 1886 he actually got into a contract dispute with one of his construction supervisors, Charles Kehl. In the course of their argument Kehl suddenly pulled a pistol and shot Fitzner, who escaped onto a streetcar and proceeded to receive medical attention at a doctor's office and then the Charity Hospital, where the bullet was removed from Fitzner's back. Kehl was soon arrested.

Fitzner died in August 1914, shortly after the outbreak of the First World War in Europe. He is buried in Greenwood Cemetery in New Orleans. Sadly, Fitzner's reputation was not always widely known into the twentieth century, even by his descendants, one of whom in 1984 reported that he only knew that his grandfather had built a few structures in New Orleans many years prior.

== Personal life ==
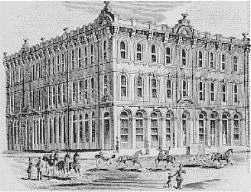
The H. Abraham & Son building for cotton factors and commission merchants on Gravier Street, designed by Fitzner and built in 1881; since demolished.

Fitzner was married three times. His first wife was Salomea Schutterle, who died in 1872 shortly after giving birth to Fitzner's eldest child. Fitzner married Caroline Hoppemeyer, also German, in 1873, when they moved into their residence on Philip Street. At his death he was married to his third wife, Anna Blattner, living in the shotgun house with her and several daughters, along with his mother-in-law, who had a full half of the house to herself.

Fitzner's political and religious affiliations are unknown. Being from northern Prussia, he was likely not Catholic. He belonged to the Germanic Masonic Union Lodge no. 12.

== Partial List of Buildings ==
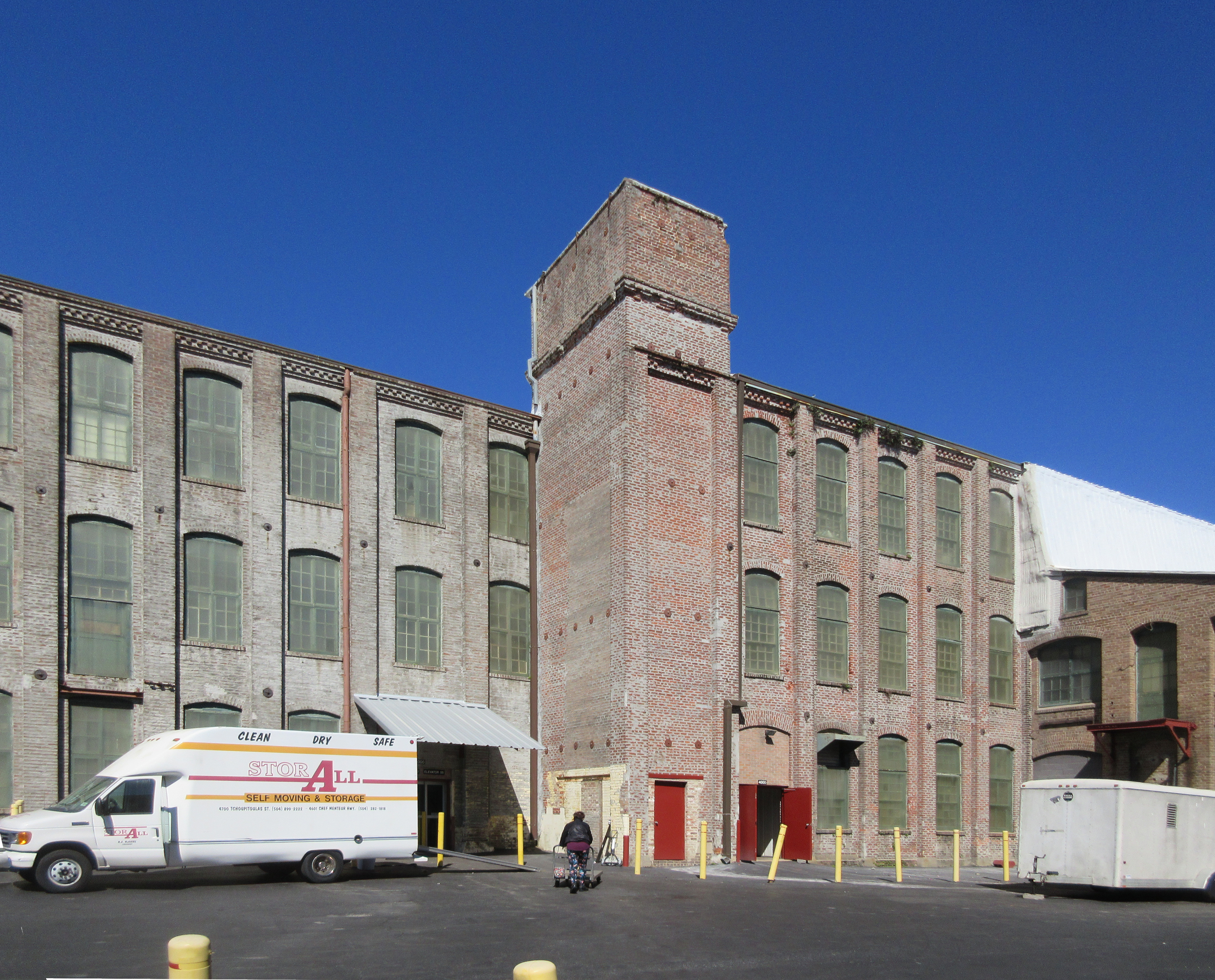
Fitzner expanded the Lane Cotton Mills Complex twice in the early-to-mid 1880s.

All in New Orleans unless otherwise noted.

- Dr. John Carter House, 1879, 1136 Second Street
- Rice, Born & Company Hardware Store (demolished), ca. 1880, Lower Camp Street
- Lane Cotton Mill No. 2, 1881, 4610 Tchoupitoulas Street
- St. Mary's Dominican Convent, 1882, 7214 St. Charles Avenue
- Louisiana Brewing Company (demolished), 1882, Jackson Avenue at Tchoupitoulas Street
- Louisiana Avenue Methodist Church, 1883
- H. Abraham & Son Office Building (demolished), 1881, 833 Gravier Street
- Hattie Thorn House, 1883, 1435 Jackson Avenue
- Simon Gumble House, 1883, 2322 Prytania Street
- Crescent Jute Manufacturing Company, 1883, 2800 Chartres Street
- Lane Cotton Mill No. 1 (extension), 1883
- Weckerling Brewing Company, 1888, Magazine Street at Howard Avenue
- Lafayette Brewing Company (demolished), 1889, Lafayette Street at Tchoupitoulas Street
- Standard Brewing Company (demolished), ca. 1895 – 1900, Johnson Street
- Anders Ugland House, 1896, 1335 Calhoun Street
- Security Building and Loan, 1900, 604 – 6 State Street
- Warehouse (demolished), 1903, 200 Girod Street
