= Fitts for Fight =

Norwegian musical duo

- Origin: Norway
- Past members: Ellinor Aurora Aasgaard; Julie Ilona Balas

Fitts for Fight was a female duo consisting of Ellinor Aurora Aasgaard and Julie Ilona Balas from Kristiansand in Norway. They became known when it was revealed that the songs they claimed to have written themselves were made by demoscene musicians and downloaded from micromusic.net, while the two women added their own often explicit lyrics to the music. According to micromusic.net they have so far identified songs from 505 of YM Rockerz, Binärpilot, 8 Bit Weapon, Arachno, Printed Circuit, Yerzmyey, Drx of Bodenständig 2000, Jo Petrole and Stu of Drop da Bomb. After it was made public that they had copied the songs, Fitts for Fight deleted the music from their page on MySpace and they were removed from Urørt. Also the by:Larm festival dropped them from the programme and they were replaced by Binärpilot. Examples of music that Fitts for Fight stole are Fuck off and die that is actually STereoid by Stu, CrashBurnDestroy that is Space Travel by Yerzmyey, and Monstermachine that is Otosclerosis by Binärpilot.

Stu of Drop da Bomb has been in contact with the Swiss copyright organisation SUISA who in turn would contact the Norwegian TONO.

== See also ==
- Timbaland plagiarism controversy
- Crystal Castles copyright disputes
