= Daily Report Online =

Newspaper in Atlanta, Georgia

- Type: Daily newspaper
- Format: Tabloid
- Owner(s): ALM
- Editor: Everett Catts
- Founded: 1890
- Headquarters: 260 Peachtree St. NW, Suite 1900; Atlanta, Georgia 30303; United States
- Circulation: 3,808 (as of 2011)
- Website: law.com/dailyreportonline

The Daily Report Online, formerly referred to as the Fulton County Daily Report, is a daily legal newspaper based in Atlanta, Georgia, United States. Established in 1890, it covers Georgia legal and business news. Notable special editions include the 'Daily Report Dozen,' a comprehensive look at Atlanta's 12 largest law firms; 'Going Rate', which details the hourly rates of several hundred Georgia lawyers; and 'On The Rise,' a yearly contemplation of the most promising legal minds under 40.

It also publishes court opinions from the Supreme Court of Georgia and the Georgia Court of Appeals, and court calendars from the Fulton County Superior Court and the Fulton County State Court. It also serves as Fulton County's official legal organ. Under this designation, it is responsible for publishing all legally required notices for the county such as mortgage foreclosures, name changes and judicial tax sales.

The Daily Report has about 4,000 paid subscribers and a readership of about 15,000. It is owned by ALM, formerly known as American Lawyer Media.

Steve Korn served as publisher from September 2005 to February 2008. Korn worked for two decades at Atlanta's Turner Broadcasting System, first as its vice president, general counsel and secretary and later at CNN as its vice chairman and chief operating officer, where he oversaw the business of the CNN News Group throughout the world. He retired in 2000. Korn left the Daily Report in 2008 to join a private equity firm.

In March 2008, Chris Mobley was named publisher of the Daily Report and South Florida's Daily Business Review. In 2012, Wayne Curtis was named publisher of the Daily Report.
