= Stacey Fitts =

American politician (born 1962)

Member of the Maine House of Representatives from the 29th district
- In office 2004–2012

Personal details
- Born: July 23, 1962 (age 64)
- Party: Republican

Stacey Fitts (born July 23, 1962) is an American Republican politician who represented District 29 in the Maine House of Representatives from 2010 to 2012.

Fitts has a career in the energy industry.
