= Fitz (given name) =

Fitz is a male given name and nickname which may refer to:

== Given name ==
- Fitz Babbitt (1790–1815), United States Navy lieutenant in the War of 1812
- Fitz Boothby (1861–1889), Scottish golfer
- Fitz Eugene Dixon Jr. (1923–2006), American educator, sportsman and philanthropist
- Fitz W. Guerin (1846–1903), American photographer and Civil War Medal of Honor recipient
- Fitz Hall (born 1980), English soccer player
- Fitz Jackson, Jamaican politician
- Fitz Henry Lane (1804–1865), American painter and printmaker born Nathaniel Rogers Lane
- Fitz Lee (Medal of Honor) (1866–1899), African-American United States Army soldier and Medal of Honor recipient
- Fitz Hugh Ludlow (1836–1870), American author, journalist, and explorer, best known for his autobiographical book The Hasheesh Eater
- Fitz James O'Brien (1828–1862), Irish-born American writer
- Fitz John Porter (1822–1901), Union Army general in the American Civil War
- Fitz Remedios Santana de Souza (1929–2020), Kenyan lawyer and politician
- Fitz Steele (born 1965), American politician
- Fitz Henry Warren (1816–1878), American politician and Union Army general
- Fitz, American radio personality and host of Country Top 40 with Fitz

== Nickname ==
- Fitzhugh L. Fulton (1925–2015), US Air Force lieutenant colonel and civilian research pilot
- Michael Fitzpatrick (musician) (born 1970), American singer-songwriter and frontman of Fitz and the Tantrums
- Fitz Hinds (1880–?), West Indian cricketer
- Fitzhugh Lee (1835–1905), Confederate Civil War general and Governor of Virginia
- Fitz Vanderpool (born 1967), Canadian boxer

== See also ==
- The dictionary definition of Fitz- at Wiktionary
- Fitz, a patronymic
- Fitz (surname)
- John F. Fitzgerald (1863–1950), known as "Honey Fitz", American politician and grandfather of President John F. Kennedy
