= Gustav Pfizer =

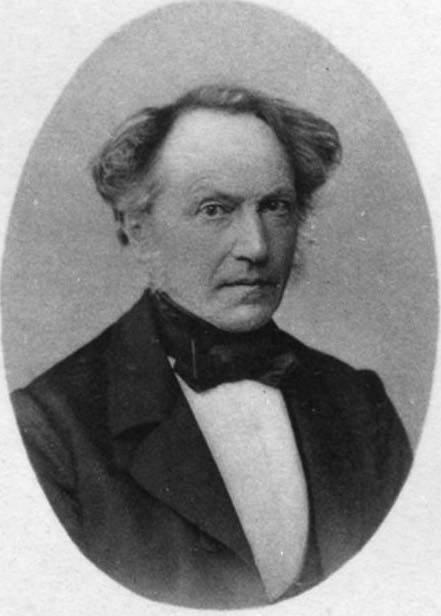

Gustav Pfizer (1807–1890) was a German poet and critic of the Swabian school.

== Biography ==
He was born in Stuttgart, studied at Tübingen, and in 1840 became professor at the gymnasium in Stuttgart. He wrote Gedichte (1831), Dichtungen epischer und episch-lyrischer Gattung (1840), and Der Welsche und der Deutsche (1844); translations of Bulwer and Byron; the critical work Uhland und Rückert (1837); and an attack on Heinrich Heine, which Heine replied to in his work Der Schwabenspiegel (“The Swabian mirror,” 1838). Pfizer's poetry has been said to be more original and reflective than most of the products of the Swabian school.
