= Pfitzer =

Pfitzer is a German surname. Notable people with the surname include:

- Ernst Hugo Heinrich Pfitzer (1846–1906), German botanist
- Wilhelm Pfitzer (1821–1905), German horticulturist

== See also ==
- Pfister (surname)
