= Arcedeckne =

Arcedeckne is a surname of Anglo-Irish origin. Notable people with the surname include:

- Andrew Arcedeckne (1780–1849), British landowner and MP
- Chaloner Arcedeckne (c. 1743–1809), English politician
- Robert Arcedekne (died 1768), Jamaican politician
- St John Desmond Arcedeckne-Butler (1896–1959), British Army officer
