= Trautschold =

Trautschold is a surname. Notable people with the surname include:

- Hermann Trautschold (1817–1902), German-Russian geologist and paleontologist
- Ilse Trautschold (1906–1991), German actress
- Manfred Trautschold (1854–1921), German genre painter and lithographer
- Wilhelm Trautschold (1815–1877), German portrait painter
