= Friendship and Greenwich plantation =

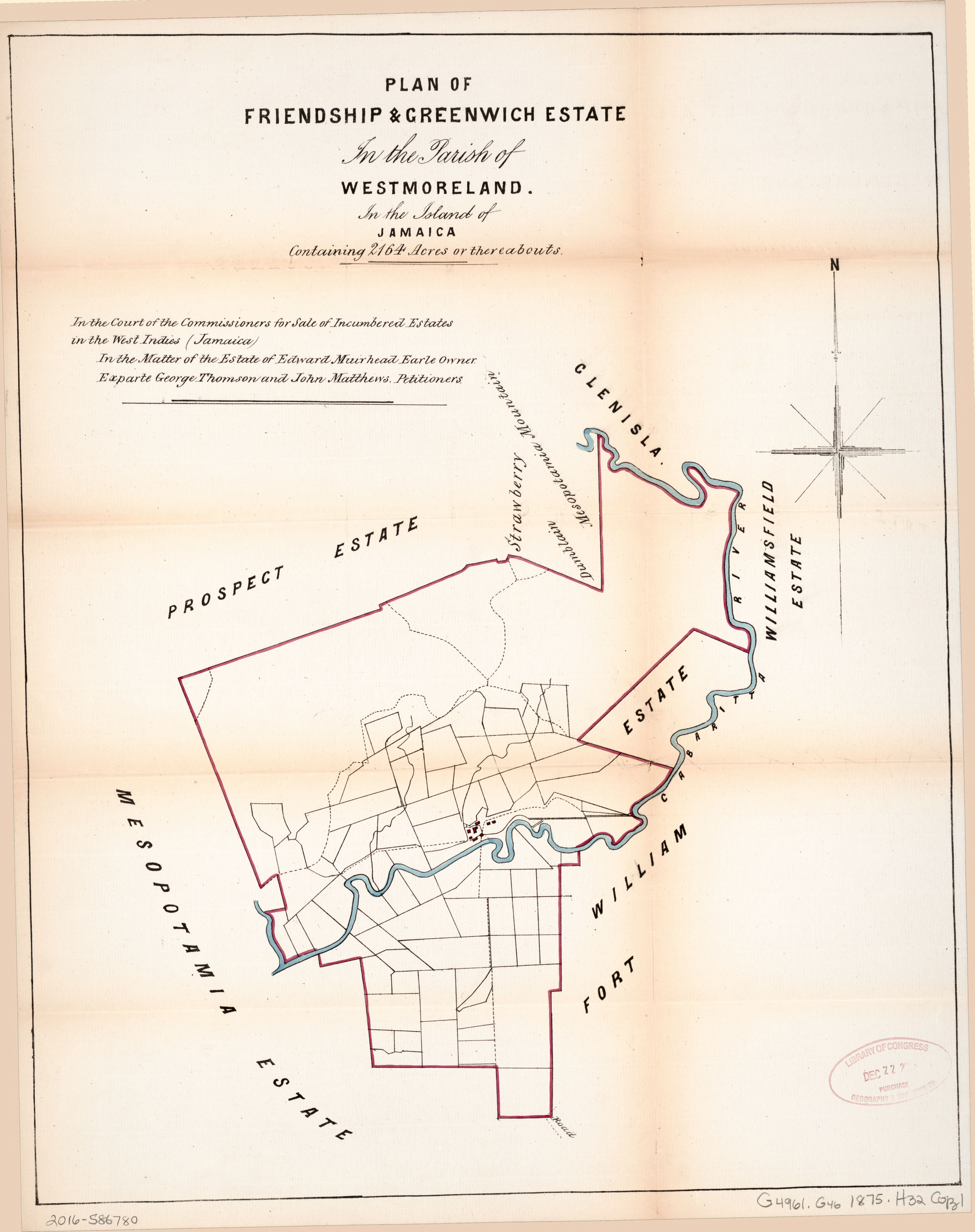
Friendship & Greenwich estate map, 1875.

The Friendship and Greenwich was a plantation in Westmoreland Parish, Jamaica, north of Savanna-la-Mar on the Cabaritta River. It was adjacent to the Mesopotamia estate.

In 1875, it came up for sale at auction in London by order of the Court of the Commissioners for Sale of Incumbered Estates in the West Indies when it was in the ownership of the estate of the late Edward Muirhead Earle.

== See also ==
- List of plantations in Jamaica
