= Henry James Passley =

Planter and politician in Jamaica

Henry James Passley (died before 1832) was a planter and slave-owner in Jamaica. He owned Rodney Hall plantation in the parish of Portland with John Paton Passley and Richard Brown Passley. He was elected to the House of Assembly of Jamaica in 1820.
