= Pen (livestock farm) =

Livestock farm in Jamaica

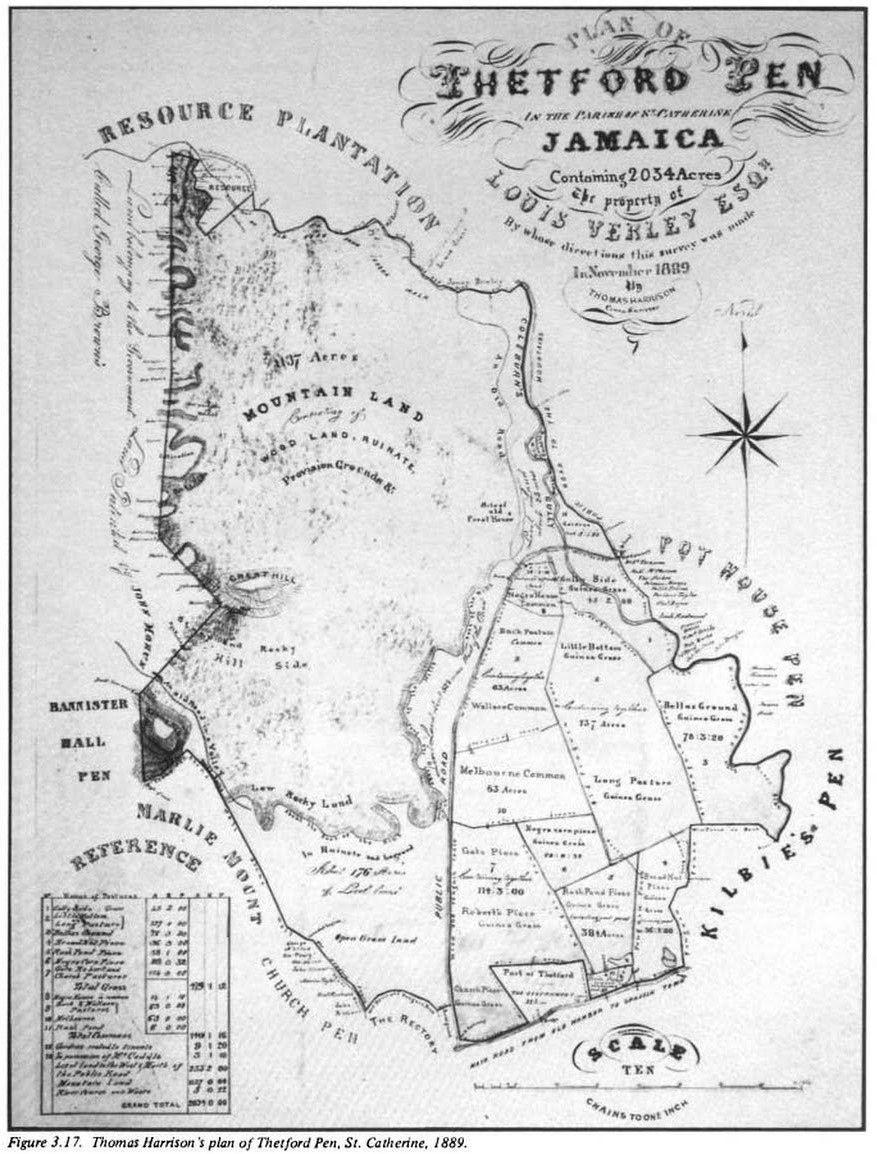
1889 map of Thetford Pen in the Parish of St. Catherine, Jamaica, containing 2,034 acres, the property of Louis Verley Esq.

A pen was a livestock farm on the Island of Jamaica. Pen-keeping included the breeding of cattle, horses, mules, sheep and dairy farming. Gardner (1873), referring to the 1750s, stated: "The life of a tolerably successful pen-keeper was at this period, as it is now, the most enviable to be found in the colony. Cattle thrive well, and few servants are required when once a pen is well established."

Batchelors Hall Pen was owned by Chaloner Arcedekne; it supplied Golden Grove Plantation, owned by the prominent Simon Taylor. Correspondence between the two men survives.

== See also ==
- List of plantations in Jamaica
