= Eleutherodactylus orcutti =

Conservation status
- Critically Endangered (IUCN 3.1)

Scientific classification
- Kingdom: Animalia
- Phylum: Chordata
- Class: Amphibia
- Order: Anura
- Clade: Brachycephaloidea
- Family: Eleutherodactylidae
- Genus: Eleutherodactylus
- Species: E. orcutti

Binomial name
- Eleutherodactylus orcutti Dunn, 1928

Species of frog

Eleutherodactylus orcutti, also known as the Arntully robber frog or Jamaican streamfrog, is a species of frog in the family Eleutherodactylidae. The frog is endemic to eastern Jamaica, where it inhabits streams and other aquatic habitats in moderately-wet forests at altitudes of 225–1,255 m (738–4,117 ft). It is classified by the IUCN as being critically endangered and may be extinct. Although abundant well into the 1980s in certain locations, the frog thenceforth underwent a rapid collapse in population, likely due to a combination of disease and habitat loss. Any existing frogs likely number fewer than 250 and are concentrated almost entirely in a single population that is declining due to habitat loss.

== Taxonomy ==
Eleutherodactylus orcutti was formally described in 1928 by the American herpetologist Emmett Reid Dunn based on an adult female collected from Arntully, Saint Thomas Parish, in Jamaica. Alongside this species, Dunn described another species in the same genus collected at the same locality, which he named E. cunctator. E. cunctator was synonymized with orcutti in 1940 by William Gardner Lynn. The species has the common names Arntully robber frog or Jamaican streamfrog in English.

== Distribution and habitat ==
The frog is endemic to eastern Jamaica, where it was formerly known from altitudes of 225–1,255 m (738–4,117 ft) in the parishes of Portland, Saint Andrew, and Saint Thomas. It inhabited streams and other aquatic habitats in moderately-wet forests, where males would vocalize in streams and waterfalls. It is now mostly extirpated from its historical range. It may have given birth to live young.

== Conservation ==
Eleutherodactylus orcutti is classified by the IUCN as being critically endangered and may be extinct. Although abundant well into the 1980s in certain locations, the frog thenceforth underwent a rapid collapse in population, likely due to a combination of disease and habitat loss. Although the species' range is under pressure from logging, encroaching coffee farms, and pesticide use, there still exist tracts of suitable forest that the species is absent from, suggesting that chytridiomycosis was a major driver of its decline. Eleutherodactylus orcutti was last seen in 1985, when it was still abundant in some areas. A reporting sighting during the time period from 2010–2013 noted a single individual in a forest stream, but this record was not confirmed or followed by surveys at the site. Currently, the species may be extinct, with any existing frogs numbering fewer than 250 and likely concentrated almost entirely in a single population that is declining due to habitat loss. The species was known to inhabit Blue and John Crow Mountains National Park, although enforcement at the park is poor and many localities within it are threatened by logging and coffee plantations.
