= West Indian Incumbered Estates Acts =

The West Indian Incumbered Estates Acts were acts of the Parliament of the United Kingdom of 1854, 1858, 1862, 1864, 1872, and 1886 that allowed creditors and other interested parties to apply for the sale of estates (plantations) in the British colonies in the West Indies despite legal encumbrances that would normally prevent such a sale. The legislation was modelled on the acts that created the Irish Encumbered Estates' Court after the Great Famine of the 1840s that allowed indebted and moribund estates to be sold.

== Background ==
The acts were modelled on the Incumbered Estates (Ireland) Act 1849 (12 & 13 Vict. c. 77). It created the Encumbered Estates' Court that allowed indebted Irish estates to be sold following the great famine of the 1840s. The Irish act came into force in 1849 and by July 1853, 3.5 million acres of land had been sold, creditors repaid according to the rulings of an independent tribunal, and estates purchased with a parliamentary title guaranteed to be free of encumbrances.

== West Indies ==
The difficult financial situation in the West Indian colonies arose following the abolition of slavery in the British Empire in 1833 that disrupted the labour supply to West Indian plantations. The financial situation in Ireland and the West Indies was similar in that landowners in both places had taken on excessive debt when times were good that now matched or exceeded the value of the underlying security. In addition, as estates become less profitable, there was a lack of capital investment in them causing them to become moribund. In both places complicated charges, mortgages, estates and trusts often prevented the calling-in of debts or the sale of estates to owners prepared to make the capital investment necessary to make them more productive.

Often the owners of West Indian estates were resident in Great Britain meaning that increasing numbers of estates were managed by attorneys (any formally appointed legal person) in the colonies, to maximise short-term income. The Lieutenant-Governor of Saint Vincent complained in 1854, for instance, that of the 87 sugar estates on the island 64 were run by attorneys due to their owners being absent and that one attorney managed 15 estates.

== Acts ==
West Indian Incumbered Estates Act 1854 (Note: Section 1.)
- Act of Parliament
- Parliament of the United Kingdom
- Long title: An Act to facilitate the Sale and Transfer of Incumbered Estates in the West Indies.
- Citation: 17 & 18 Vict. c. 117
- Territorial extent: United Kingdom

Dates
- Royal assent: 11 August 1854
- Commencement: 2 February 1857 (St. Vincent) (Note: Section 2.)
- Repealed: 25 June 1886
Other legislation
Amended by	West Indian Incumbered Estates Act 1858; West Indian Incumbered Estates Act 1862; West Indian Incumbered Estates Act 1864
Repealed by	West Indian Incumbered Estates Act 1886
Relates to	West Indian Incumbered Estates Act 1872

Status: Repealed

Text of statute as originally enacted

The West Indian Incumbered Estates Act 1854 provided for a chief commissioner and up to two assistant commissioners to be appointed in England together with commissioners in the participating colonies. The first commissioners took office in February 1857.

West Indian Incumbered Estates Act 1858
- Act of Parliament
- Parliament of the United Kingdom
- Long title: An Act to amend "The West Indian Incumbered Estates Act, 1854."
- Citation: 21 & 22 Vict. c. 96
- Territorial extent: United Kingdom

Dates
- Royal assent: 2 August 1858
- Commencement: 2 August 1858 (Note: The Acts of Parliament (Commencement) Act 1793.)
- Repealed: 25 June 1886
Other legislation
Amends	West Indian Incumbered Estates Act 1854
Amended by	West Indian Incumbered Estates Act 1862; West Indian Incumbered Estates Act 1864; Statute Law Revision Act 1875
Repealed by	West Indian Incumbered Estates Act 1886
Relates to	West Indian Incumbered Estates Act 1872

Status: Repealed

Text of statute as originally enacted

West Indian Incumbered Estates Act 1862
- Act of Parliament
- Parliament of the United Kingdom
- Long title: An Act to amend "The West Indian Incumbered Estates Acts, 1854 and 1858."
- Citation: 25 & 26 Vict. c. 45
- Territorial extent: United Kingdom

Dates
- Royal assent: 17 July 1862
- Commencement: 17 July 1862
- Repealed: 25 June 1886
Other legislation
Amends	West Indian Incumbered Estates Act 1854; West Indian Incumbered Estates Act 1858
Amended by	West Indian Incumbered Estates Act 1864
Repealed by	West Indian Incumbered Estates Act 1886
Relates to	West Indian Incumbered Estates Act 1872

Status: Repealed

Text of statute as originally enacted

West Indian Incumbered Estates Act 1864
- Act of Parliament
- Parliament of the United Kingdom
- Long title: An Act to amend "The West Indian Incumbered Estates Acts."
- Citation: 27 & 28 Vict. c. 108
- Territorial extent: United Kingdom

Dates
- Royal assent: 29 July 1864
- Commencement: 29 July 1864
- Repealed: 25 June 1886
Other legislation
Amends	West Indian Incumbered Estates Act 1854; West Indian Incumbered Estates Act 1858; West Indian Incumbered Estates Act 1862
Repealed by	West Indian Incumbered Estates Act 1886
Relates to	West Indian Incumbered Estates Act 1872

Status: Repealed

Text of statute as originally enacted

West Indies Incumbered Estates Act 1872
- Act of Parliament
- Parliament of the United Kingdom
- Long title: An Act to continue the Appointment and Jurisdiction of the Commissioners for the Sale of Incumbered Estates in the West Indies.
- Citation: 35 & 36 Vict. c. 9
- Territorial extent: United Kingdom

Dates
- Royal assent: 13 May 1872
- Commencement: 13 May 1872
- Repealed: 25 June 1886
Other legislation
Amended by	Statute Law Revision Act 1883
Repealed by	West Indian Incumbered Estates Act 1886

Status: Repealed

Text of statute as originally enacted

West Indian Incumbered Estates Act 1886
- Act of Parliament
- Parliament of the United Kingdom
- Long title: An Act to provide for the determination of the Acts respecting the Sale and Transfer of Incumbered Estates in the West Indies.
- Citation: 49 & 50 Vict. c. 36
- Territorial extent: United Kingdom

Dates
- Royal assent: 25 June 1886
- Commencement: 25 June 1886
- Repealed: 25 July 1898
Other legislation
Repeals/revokes	West Indian Incumbered Estates Act 1854; West Indian Incumbered Estates Act 1858; West Indian Incumbered Estates Act 1862; West Indian Incumbered Estates Act 1864; West Indian Incumbered Estates Act 1872
Repealed by	Statute Law Revision Act 1898

Status: Repealed

Text of statute as originally enacted

Colonies could apply, with the permission of their local legislatures, to participate in the scheme, the first to do so being Saint Vincent in 1856 which also submitted the first petition under the acts in August 1857. The next colony admitted to the scheme was Tobago in 1858. Deficiencies in the original act soon became apparent and an amended act, the West Indian Incumbered Estates Act 1858 (21 & 22 Vict. c. 96), was passed.

Colonies were admitted as follows:

- St. Vincent (1857)
- Tobago (1858)
- St. Christopher (1860)
- Virgin Islands (1860)
- Jamaica (1861)
- Antigua (1864)
- Montserrat (1865)
- Grenada (1866)
- Dominica (1867)
- Nevis (1867)

The first plantation sold under the acts was Arnos Vale Estate in Saint Vincent, formerly in the ownership of William Samuel Greatheed who left it to his widow and children. It was stated to have been entirely unproductive from 1854. The case was heard in March 1858 and the estate sold by auction in London in November that year, the purchaser being the reverend F. R. Braithwaite of Saint Vincent for £10,050, a sum that Reginald Cust, commissioner and historian of the legislation, noted was much higher than expected.

== Legacy and records ==
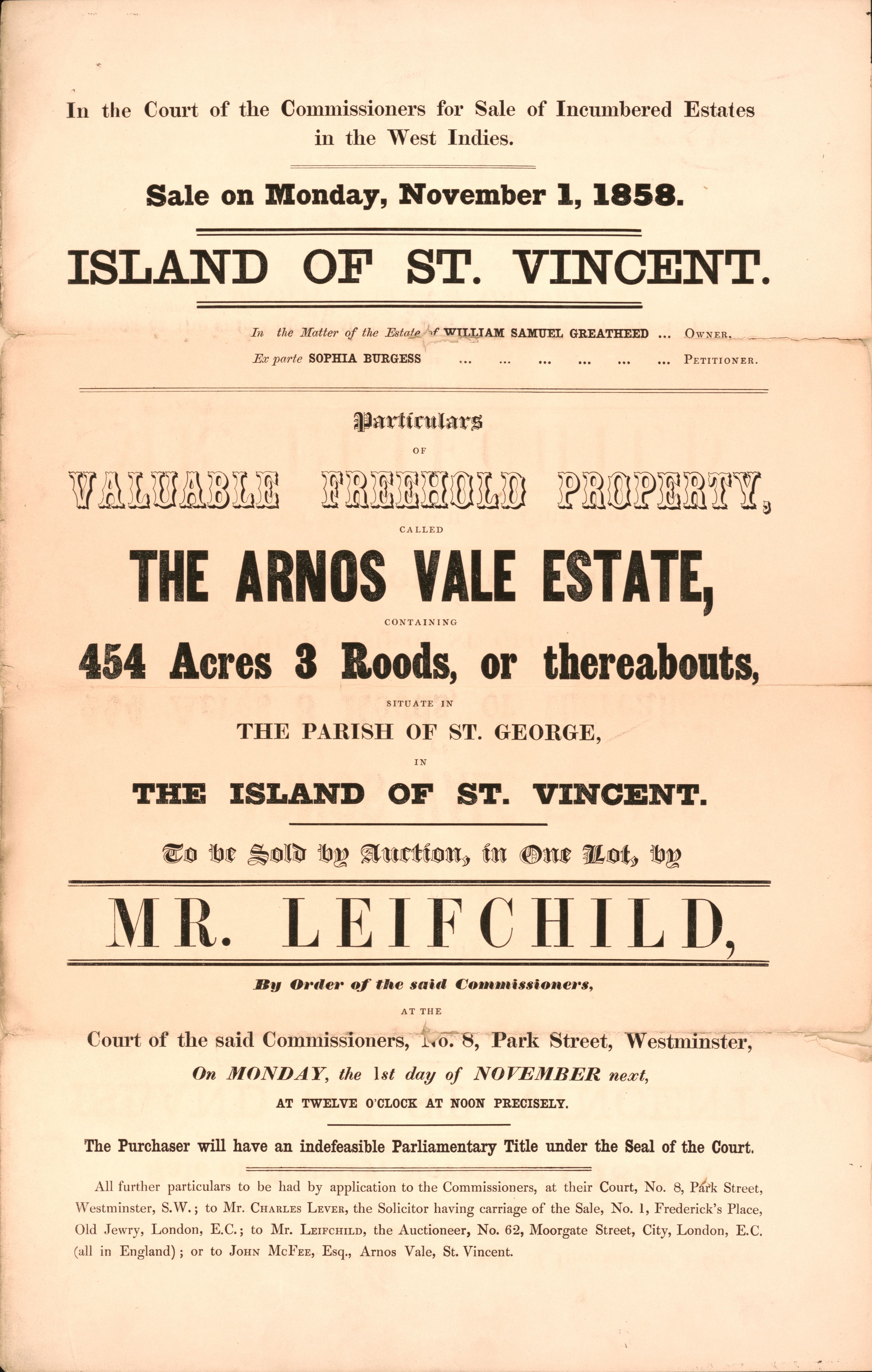
Sale particulars for Arnos Vale Estate, 1858.

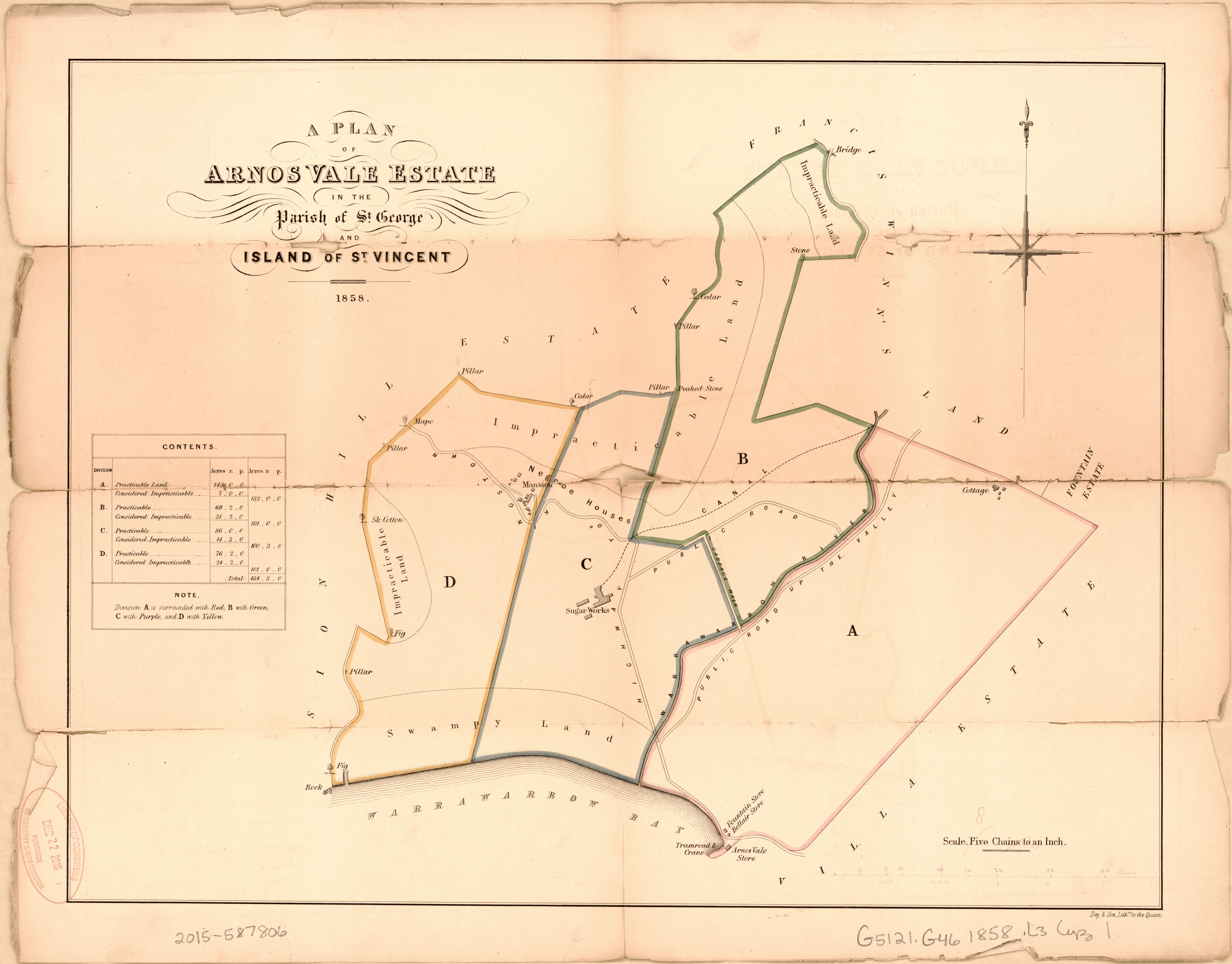
1858 map of Arnos Vale Estate, Saint Vincent, prepared as part of the auction particulars for sale under the Acts.

Reginald Cust's detailed history of the legislation was published in 1859 with a second edition in 1865 and a supplement in 1874. The 1883 Report on the Working of the West Indian Incumbered Estates Court Acts was printed for Parliament in 1884 and is held by the British National Archives. Many of the auction sale particulars are available as scans in the collection of the Library of Congress.

== Estates sold under the acts ==
=== 1850s ===
- Arnos Vale, St. Vincent, 1858.

=== 1860s ===
- Hillside, Brazaletto, Chesterfield, all Jamaica, 1862.
- Mexico, Jamaica, 1862.
- Haughton Tower, Jamaica, 1864.
- Mile Gully and Spitzbergen, Harmans or Harmony Run, Paradise, Piper's or Smith's Penn, Mumbies & Blackwall, Garbrand Hall and Mullet Hall, all in Jamaica, 1864.
- San Souci, Mount Greenan, Lambou Vale, Peruvian Vale, Henry's Vale, all in St. Vincent, 1864.
- Waterloo and Orange Hill, St. Vincent, 1864.
- Pennistons, Escape, both in St. Vincent, 1865.
- Pearls, Boulogne, Madeys, Bocage, all in Grenada, 1867.
- Canefield, Dominica, 1869.
- Longville, Jamaica, 1869.
- Plaisance, Grenada, 1869.

=== 1870s ===
- Cave Valley, Dover Pen, Hyde Park, Tooting, all in Jamaica, 1870.
- Water Valley, Weston Favell Penn, Dry Valley Penn, Providence, all Jamaica, 1870.
- Weeks or River Head, Lower Streatham, Upper Streatham, Ryley's, Windward or White's, Hermitage or Irish's, Tar River, all in Montserrat, 1870.
- River, Dominica, 1871.
- Fontabelle, Jamaica, 1874.
- Hermitage, Grenada, 1874.

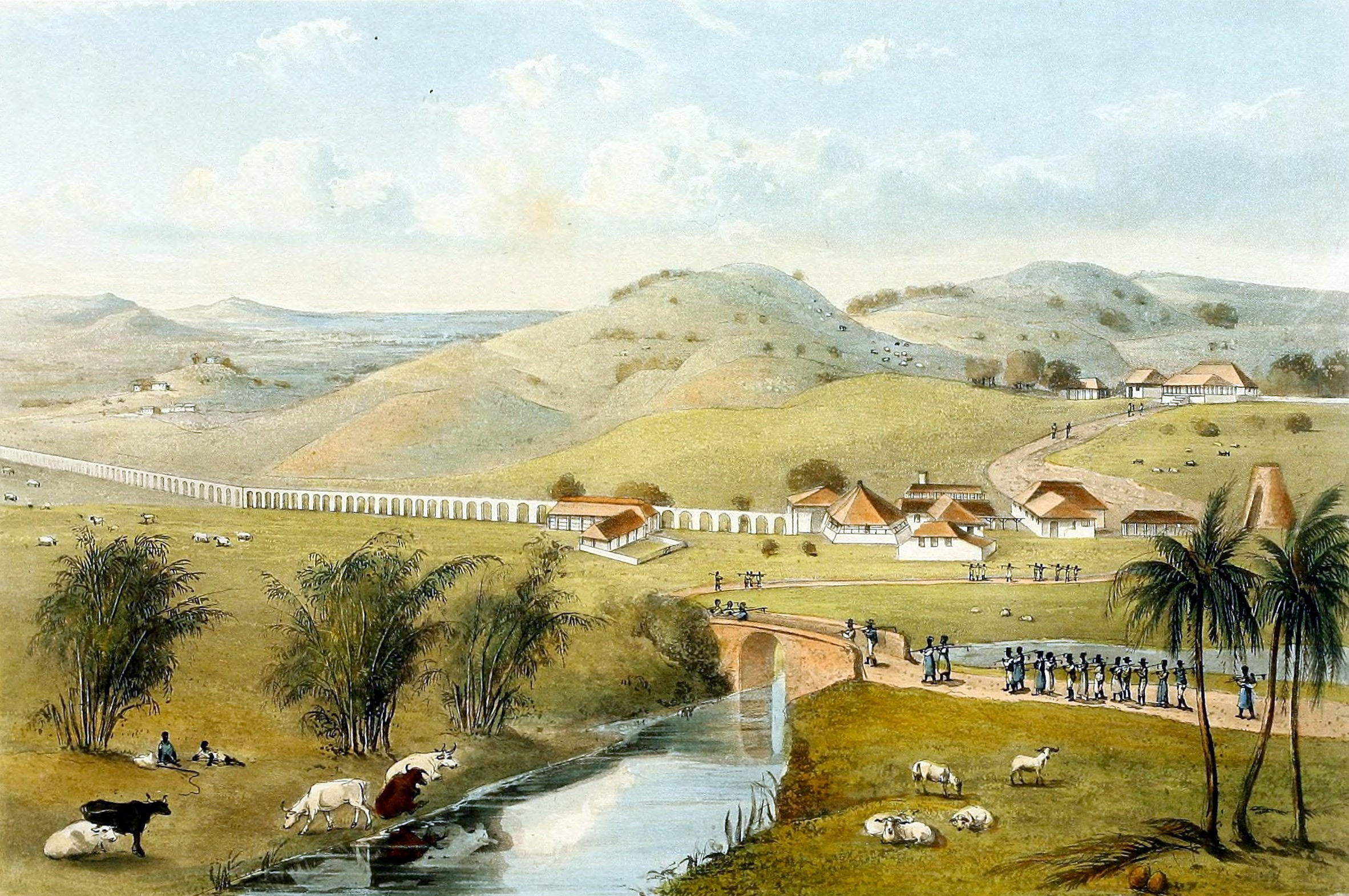
"Trinity Estate, St. Mary's" by James Hakewill, 1820-21.

- Trinity, Roslyn Pen, Cromwell, Cromwell Mountain, all in Jamaica, 1874.
- Bacolet or Hope, Baillies Bacolet, Westerhall, Morne Delice, all in Grenada, 1875.
- Friendship & Greenwich, Jamaica, 1875.
- Savoy and Orange River Pen, Jamaica, 1875.
- Hazelymph Estate, Greenwich Plantation, Belvidere Pen, all in Jamaica, 1876.
- Brodericks, Montserrat, 1877.
- Clarke's Court, Grenada, 1877.
- Mosquito Cove, Jamaica, 1877.
- Rosalie, Dominica, 1877.
- Grand Sable, St. Vincent, 1878.
- Hopewell and Mount Horeb & West Vale, Jamaica, 1878.
- Halse Hall, Caswell Hill, Halse Hall Crawle etc., Jamaica, 1877/78.
- Anchovy Bottom, Jamaica, 1878.
- Hopewell, Mount Horeb and West Vale, Jamaica, 1878.
- Carlisle, Jamaica, 1879.

=== 1880s ===
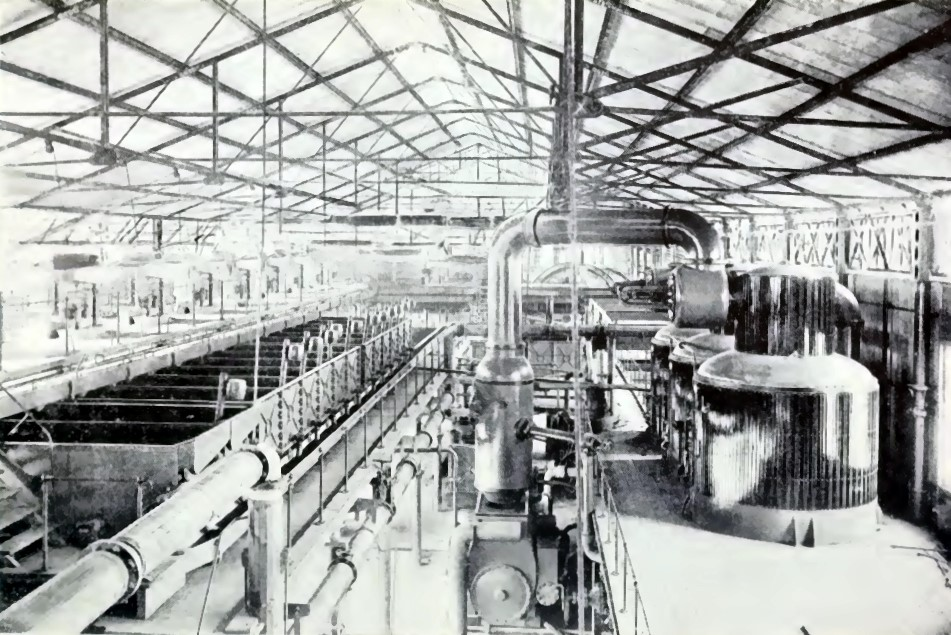
Sugar refining equipment at Albion c. 1890.

- Laura, Mount Gay and Bon Accord, Granada, 1880.
- Winchester, Hopewell Hall Pen, Jamaica, 1880.
- Koningsberg, Cape Clear Pen, Jamaica, 1881.
- Ayton, Jamaica, 1882.
- Berkshire Hall, Jamaica, 1884.
- Tuitts, Bethels, Luthers, all in Montserrat, 1886.
- Weeks or River Head, Tar River, Montserrat, 1886.
- Prospect, Industry, Cove Pen, all Jamaica, 1887.
- Halse Hall, Caswell Hill, the Lodge, Halse Hall Crawle; Springfield, Grimmett, Milk Spring pens; Milk, Priddles, Content, all Jamaica, 1887.
- Albion, Jamaica, 1889.

== See also ==
- List of plantations in Jamaica
