= Mesopotamia, Jamaica =

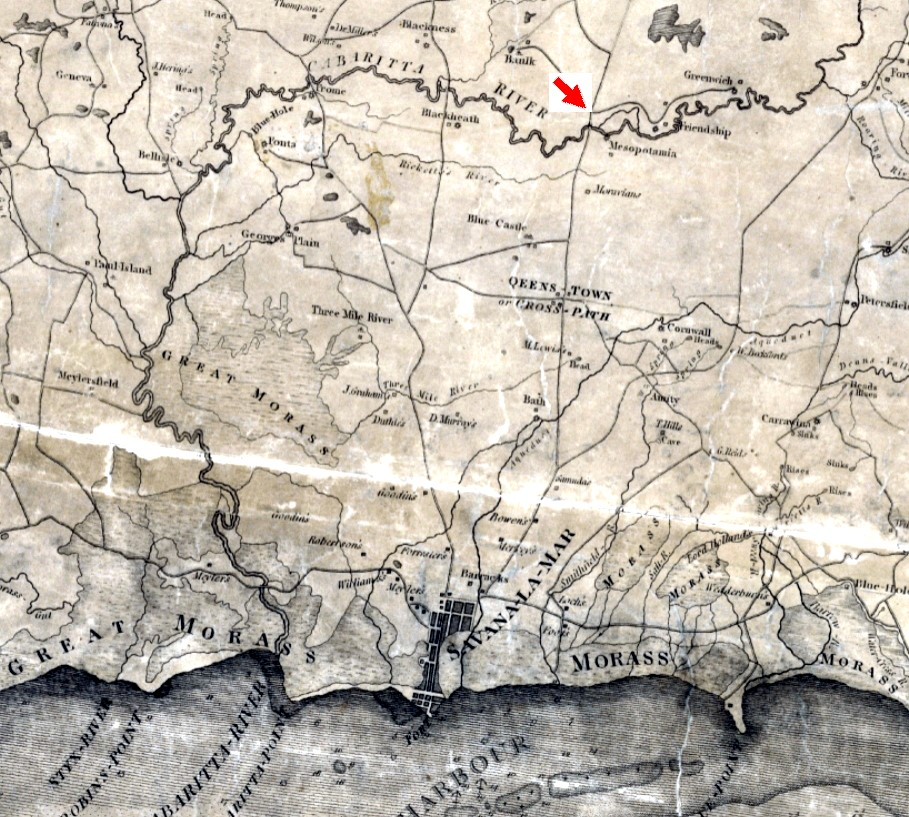
Mesopotamia plantation (arrowed) on James Robertson's map of 1804.

Mesopotamia was a sugar plantation in Westmoreland Parish, Jamaica, north of Savanna-la-Mar on the Cabaritta River. It was adjacent to the Friendship and Greenwich estate.

== History ==
The plantation was established around 1700 and according to official returns was one of 23 sugar plantations in the parish that employed over 200 slaves.

It was associated with the Barham family. It was first in the ownership of Dr Henry Barham (c.1728-1746) and subsequently Joseph Foster Barham (c.1746-1789) and Joseph Foster Barham II (c.1789-1832).

The chemist John Buddle Blyth was baptised at Mesopotamia in 1816. His father John Blythe was attorney for Mesopotamia in the early 19th-century.

== See also ==
- List of plantations in Jamaica
