= Cabarita =

Cabarita may refer to:

- Cabarita, New South Wales, a suburb of Sydney, Australia
- Cabarita, Victoria, a town in Australia
- Cabarita River, in Jamaica

== See also ==
- Cabarita Beach, New South Wales, a beach in northeastern NSW, Australia
- Cabarita ferry wharf, a wharf on the Parramatta River serving Cabarita, NSW
- Cabarita Reserve ("mission"), an Aboriginal community in New South Wales where former rugby league player Jamal Idris grew up
