= John Buddle Blyth =

John Buddle Blyth MSA
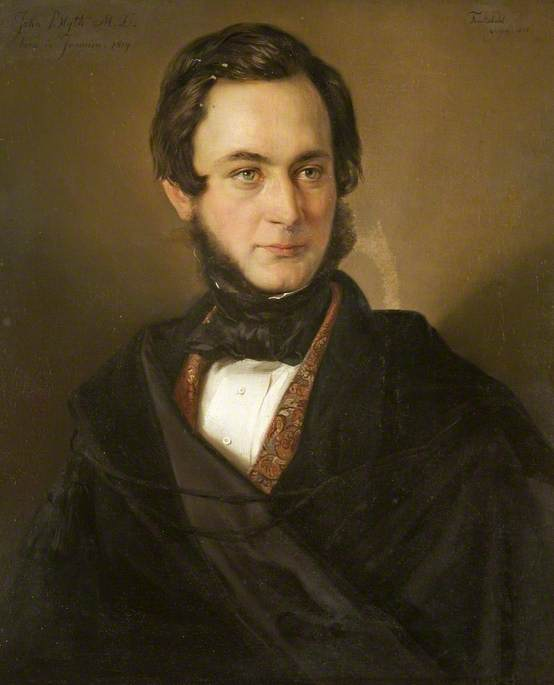
- John Buddle Blyth, attributed to Wilhelm Trautschold, 1845. Oil on canvas, Royal Agricultural University, Cirencester.
- Born: 1814
- Died: 24 December 1871 (aged 56–57)
- Education: University of Edinburgh
- Occupation: Chemist
- Medical career
- Institutions: Queen's College Cork
- Notable works: First report of photopolymerisation

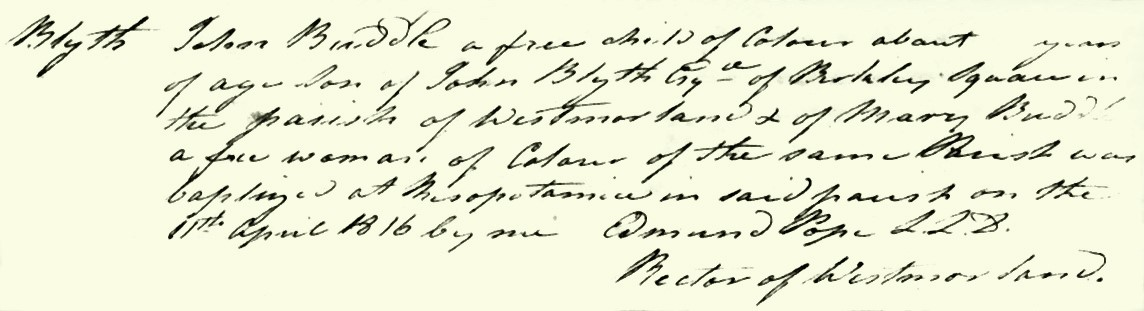
Entry in baptism register, 1816.

John Buddle Blyth (1814 – 24 December 1871) was a Jamaican-born chemist who was the first professor of chemistry at Queen's College Cork in Ireland. With August Wilhelm von Hofmann, he was the first to report photopolymerisation which they observed when styrene became metastyrol after exposure to sunlight.

== Early life and family ==
John Blyth was born in Jamaica in 1814 to John Blythe and Mary Buddle, a "free woman of colour". He was baptised at Mesopotamia in Westmoreland Parish on 11 April 1816 by Edmund Pope, rector of Westmorland, and described as a "free child of colour". He had brothers Charles (1817) and Henry (c.1831).

Blyth's parents are not thought to have been married, however, his father left his assets to Mary Buddle in his will and his father obtained the money to buy the Kendal plantation from Mary's father John Buddle indicating that the Buddles had wealth.

He was educated at Dumfries in Scotland and then at the University of Glasgow where he obtained a degree in arts. He received his MD from the University of Edinburgh in 1839 for a thesis titled "The Dependence of the Animal and Organic Functions on Nervous Influence; and the Identity of the Latter with Electricity".

He married Jessie Dunbar in Applegarth, Scotland, in 1847.

== Career ==
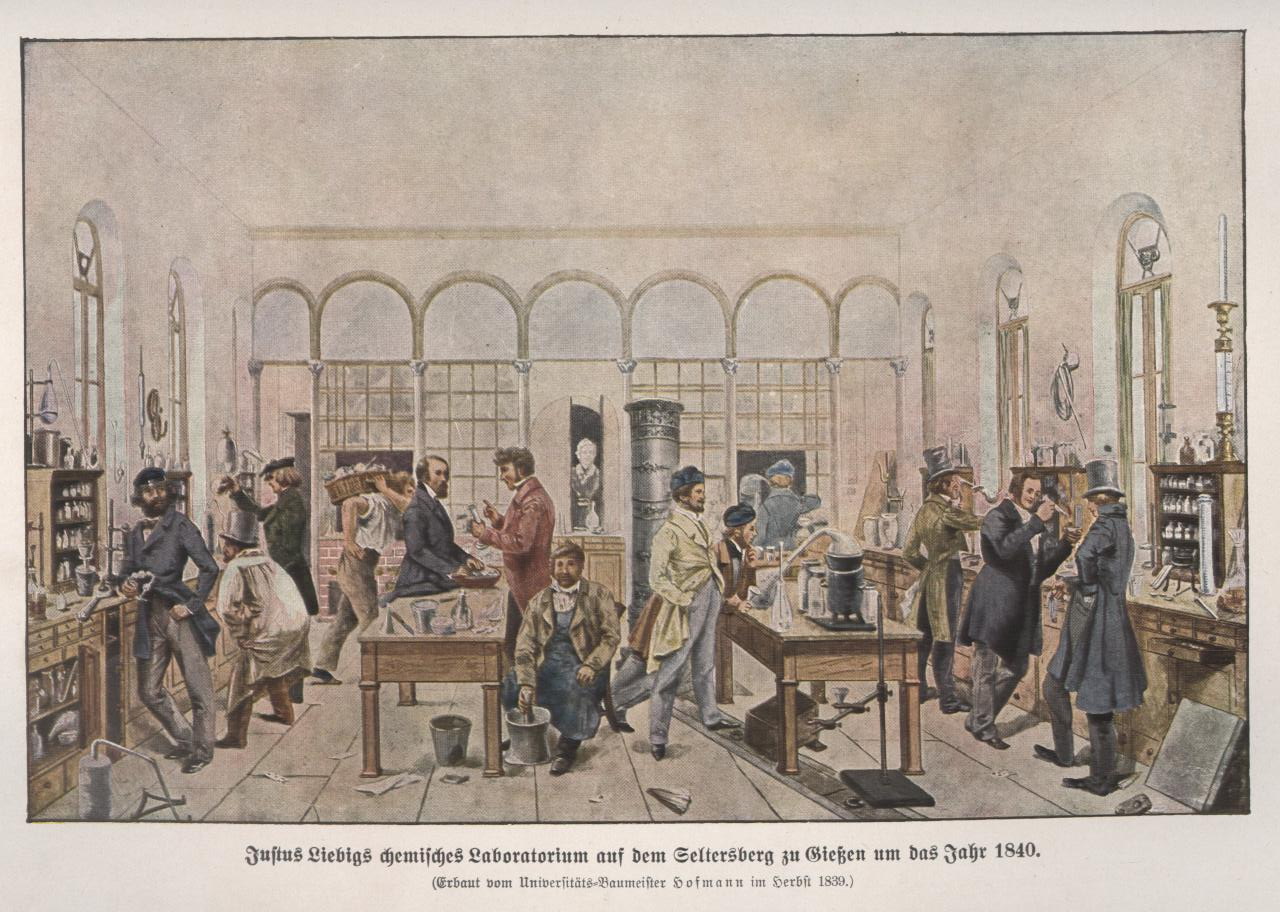
Justus von Liebig's laboratory at Giessen by Wilhelm Trautschold, 1841.

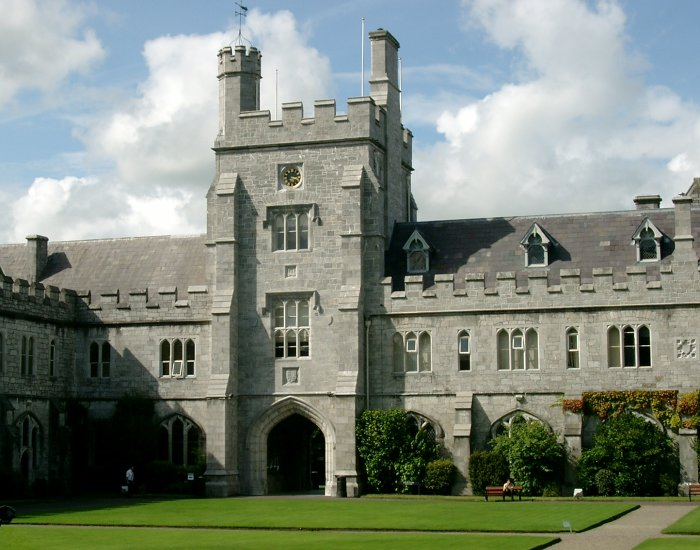
Queen's College Cork

Blyth studied at the University of Giessen in Germany and spent six months in Berlin. In the 1840s, Blyth and the German chemist August Wilhelm von Hofmann were the first to report photopolymerisation when they observed that styrene became metastyrol when exposed to sunlight but remained unchanged in the dark.

He was professor of chemistry at the Royal Agricultural College in Cirencester, England, from 1847 to 1848 and in 1849 he was the first professor of chemistry at Queen's College Cork in Ireland.

He translated works by the German chemist Justus von Liebig, of whom he had been a student at Giessen, into English. These included the second volume of the seventh edition of von Liebig's work on agricultural chemistry which was published in New York in 1863 as The Natural Laws of Husbandry. This work included a translation of the introduction to the first volume, the original version of which was considered so controversial for its critique of British farming that it prevented that volume being published in English.

== Death ==
Blyth died on 24 December 1871 at Parkview Terrace, Cork, and was buried at Blackrock in that city. Probate was granted to his wife Jessie. He left less than £2,000. (Approximately £250,000 in 2020)

== Selected publications ==
- Blyth, John; Hofmann, August Wilhelm (1843). "CXXXVIII. On styrole, and some of the products of its decomposition" (PDF). Memoirs and Proceedings of the Chemical Society. 2: 334–58. doi:10.1039/MP8430200334.
- Blyth, John; Hofmann, August Wilhelm (1845). "Ueber das Styrol und einige seiner Zersetzungsproducte". Annalen der Chemie und Pharmacie. 53 (3): 289–329. doi:10.1002/jlac.18450530302.
- Von Liebig, Justus. (1859) Letters on Modern Agriculture. London: Walton & Maberley. (translator)
- Von Liebig, Justus. (1863) The Natural Laws of Husbandry. New York: Appleton. (translator)
