= John Blythe (Jamaican politician) =

Jamaican landowner (died 1830s)

John Blythe (died 1830s) was the owner of the Kendal and Tweedside estates in Westmoreland Parish, Jamaica. He was elected to the House of Assembly of Jamaica in 1820.

His son with Mary, "a free woman of colour", was the chemist John Buddle Blyth.

== See also ==
- Mesopotamia
