= Vladimir Luginin =

Russian chemist

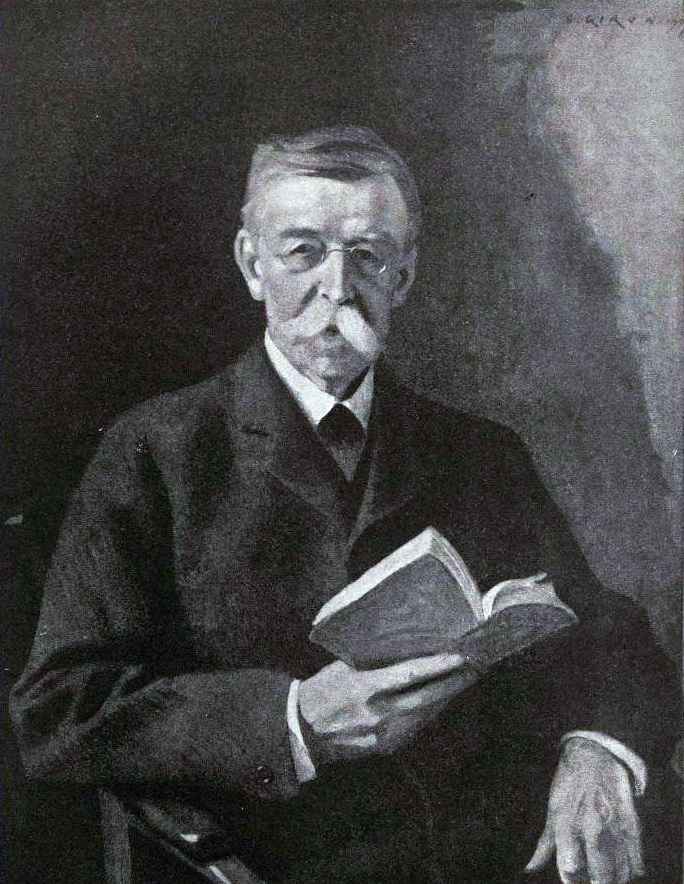

Vladimir Fedorovich Luginin (French form Louginine) (20 May 1834 – 13 October 1911) was a Russian physical chemist. His main work was in thermochemistry, and dealt with the heat of combustion of organic compounds.

Luginin was born in a noble family in Moscow, where his father Fedor Nikolaevich Luginin was an army officer. After education at home under the tutorship of H.A. Trautschold (1817-1902) who was an assistant of Justus Liebig and later a geologist. Luginin then joined the Mikhailovskaya Military Artillery Academy in St. Petersburg in 1849. In 1853-54 he was assigned to the Turkish front and during the Crimean war, he saw action in the defence of Sevastopol. He returned in 1856 to finish his studies and graduated in 1858. He retired from service in 1861 and travelled through western Europe, attending lectures by R. W. Bunsen, J. Wislizenus, C.A. Wurtz, and Clausius. He was politically active until 1867, being member of the secret Velikorus and a close friend of Alexander Herzen, N. P. Ogarev, and Mikhail Bakunin. He gave up political activism in 1867 and shifted to science. He spent some time in the Paris laboratories of H.V. Regnault and Berthelot. In 1873 he returned home and established a home laboratory and began to work on calorimetry. He examined the heat of reactions and examined the effects of electronegative groups which substituted hydrogen in organic compounds. Luginin received an honorary doctorate in 1890 from Moscow University. In 1899 he was appointed as a professor at Moscow University. He was fluent in four languages and bequeathed his library of 8000 books to Moscow University and donated his laboratory in 1903.

He died in Paris after a long illness.
