= Mayfield Falls =

Waterfall in Jamaica

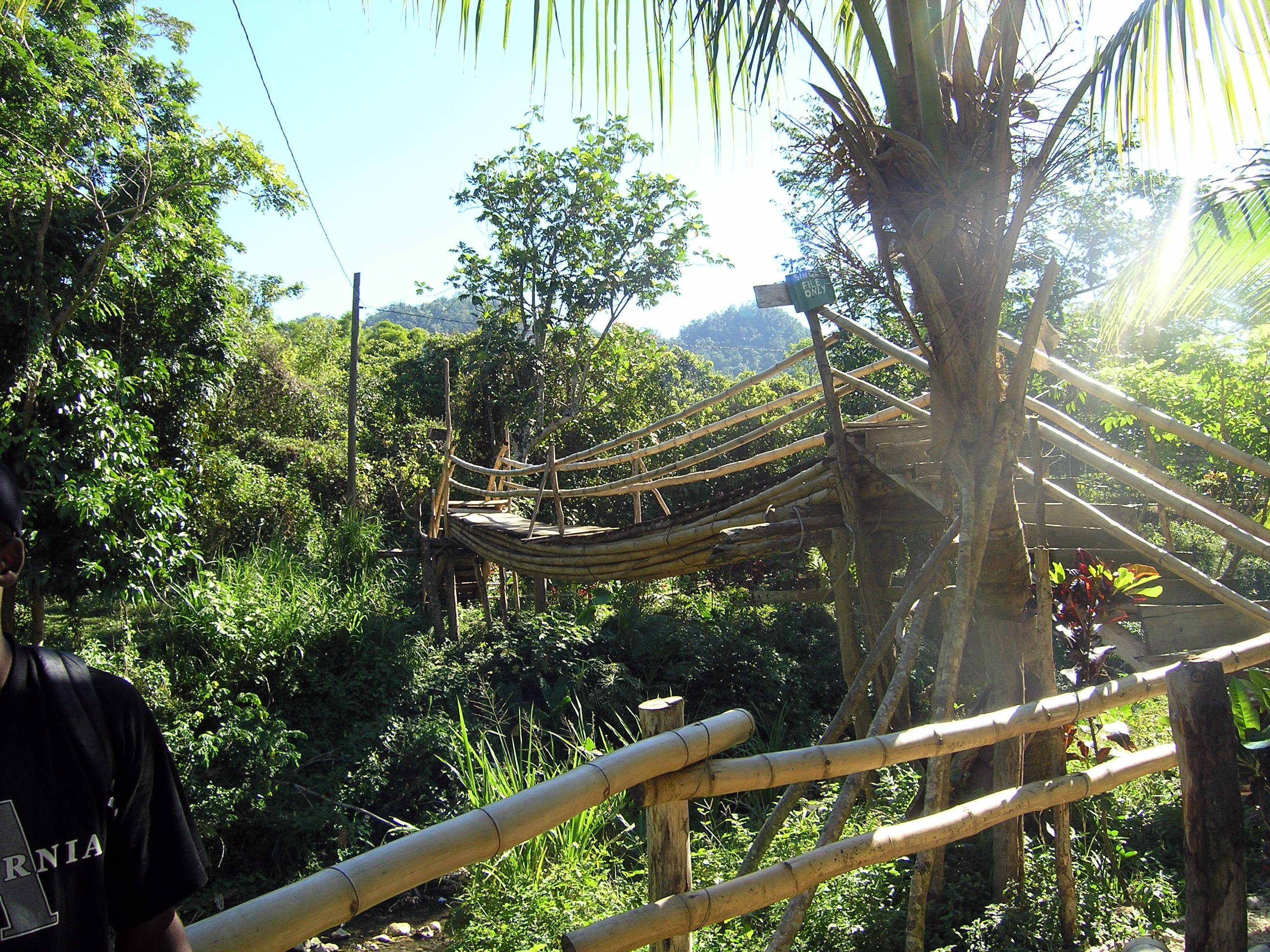
- Rope bridge on the River Walk to the Mayfield Falls

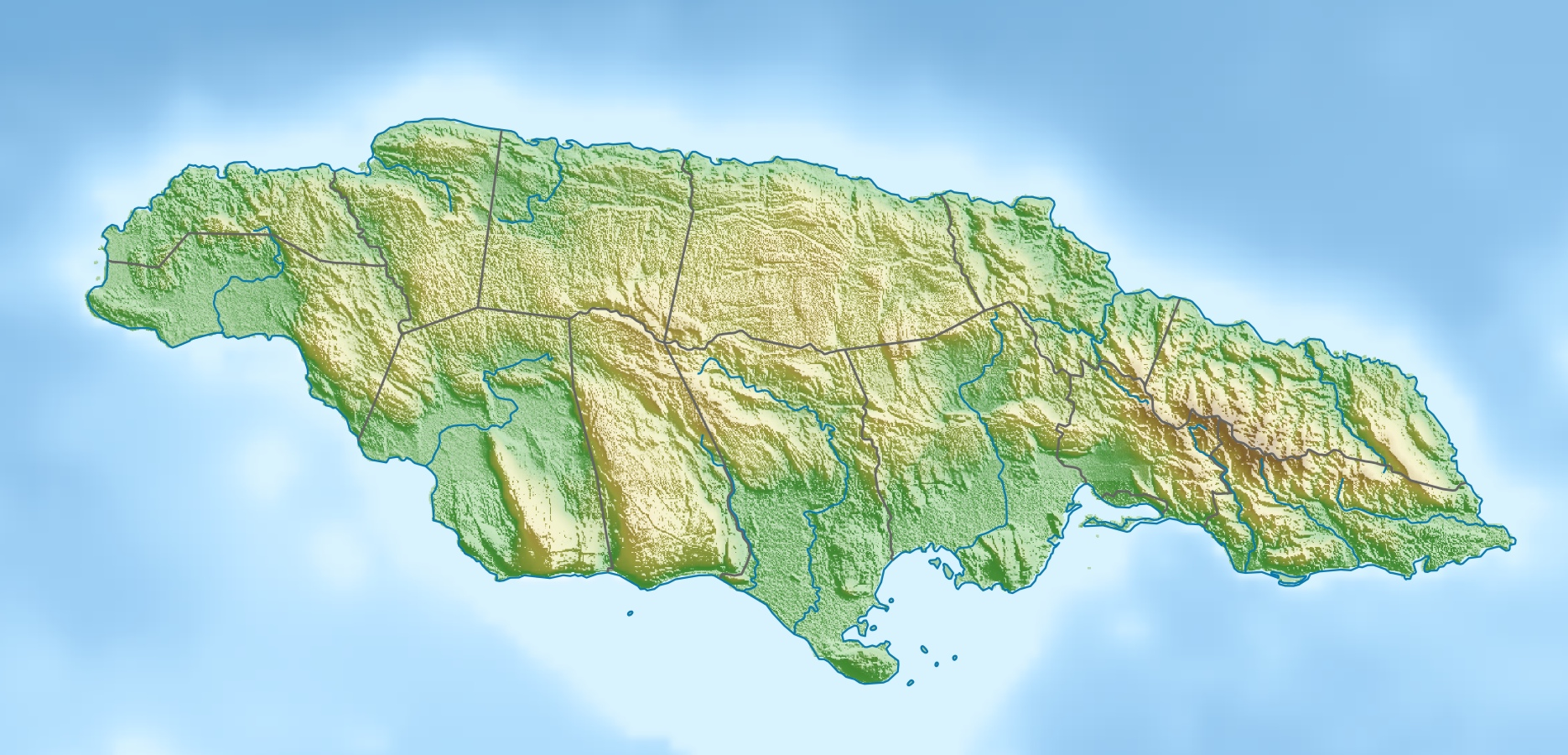
- Location within Jamaica
- Location: Westmoreland, Jamaica
- Coordinates: 18°21′08″N 78°04′55″W
- Type: Multi-step cascade
- Number of drops: Twenty one
- Longest drop: 3 metres (9.8 ft)
- Watercourse: Mayfield River a tributary of the Cabarita River

Mayfield Falls is a waterfall in Jamaica that comprises 21 widely spaced small cascades on the Mayfield River, a tributary of the Cabarita River. Mayfield Falls is in Glenbrook, Westmoreland.

The tallest cascade is the upper most of the 21; called "The Washing Machine" it is about 3 metres (9.8 ft) high, with room enough for a person to walk underneath.

== See also ==
- List of waterfalls
