= Whitney Estate =

Plantation in Clarendon Parish, Jamaica

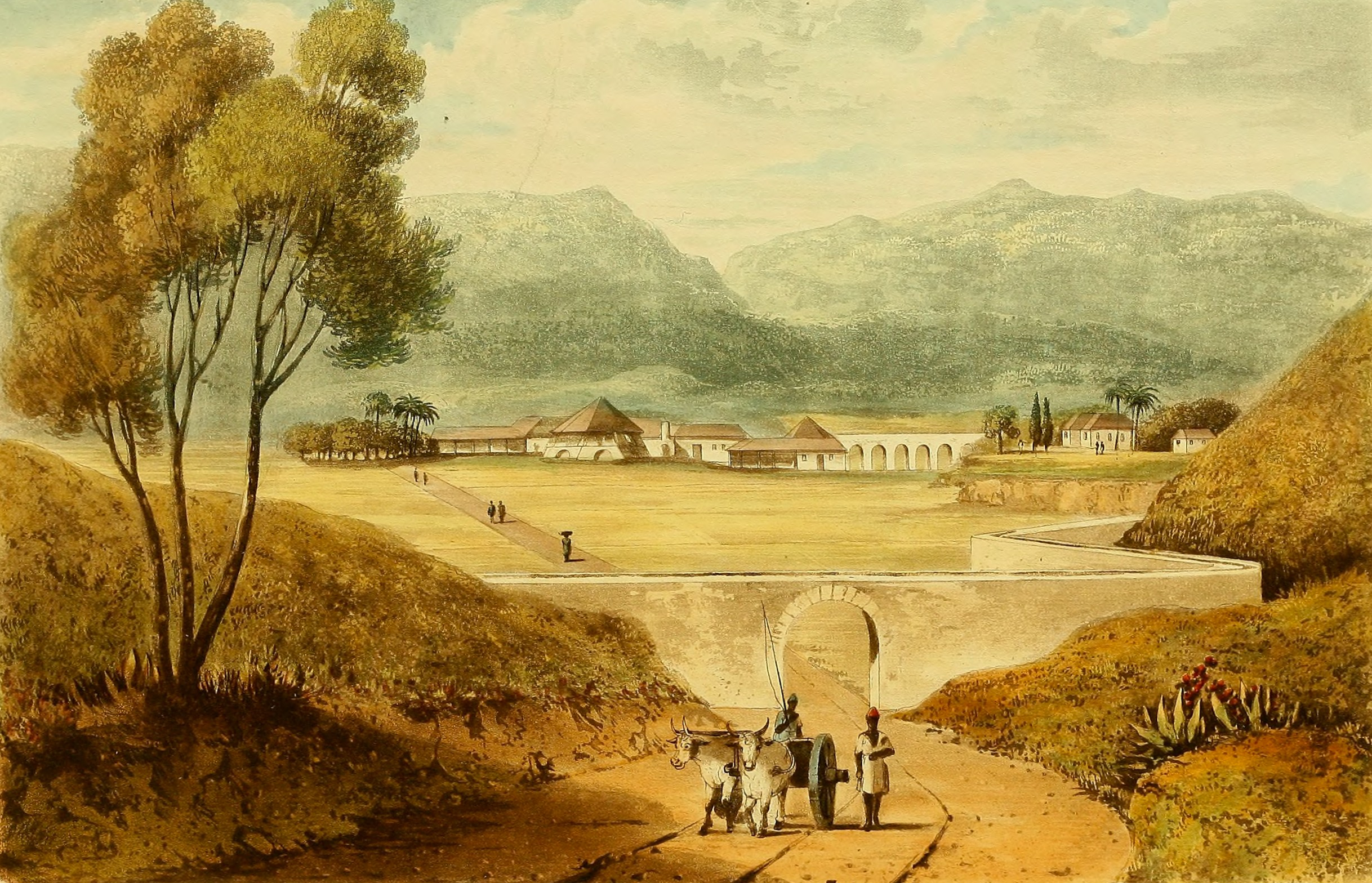
Whitney Estate, 1820 The Mocho Mountains are in the background

The Whitney Estate was a plantation in Clarendon Parish, Jamaica.

James Hakewill visited the estate during his tour of Jamaica 1820–1. The estate was 3,243 in extent, all of which was fertile. Edward Long wrote: ""The plantation(...) is one of the most celebrated for its fertility. It is a small dale surrounded with rocky hills, and so rich that it produces invariably three hundred hogsheads of sugar per annum, with so little labour upon it, that [the enslaved Africans] multiply sufficiently to keep up their stock, without having recourse to African recruits."

== See also ==
- List of plantations in Jamaica
