= List of plantations in Jamaica =

The modern parishes of Jamaica

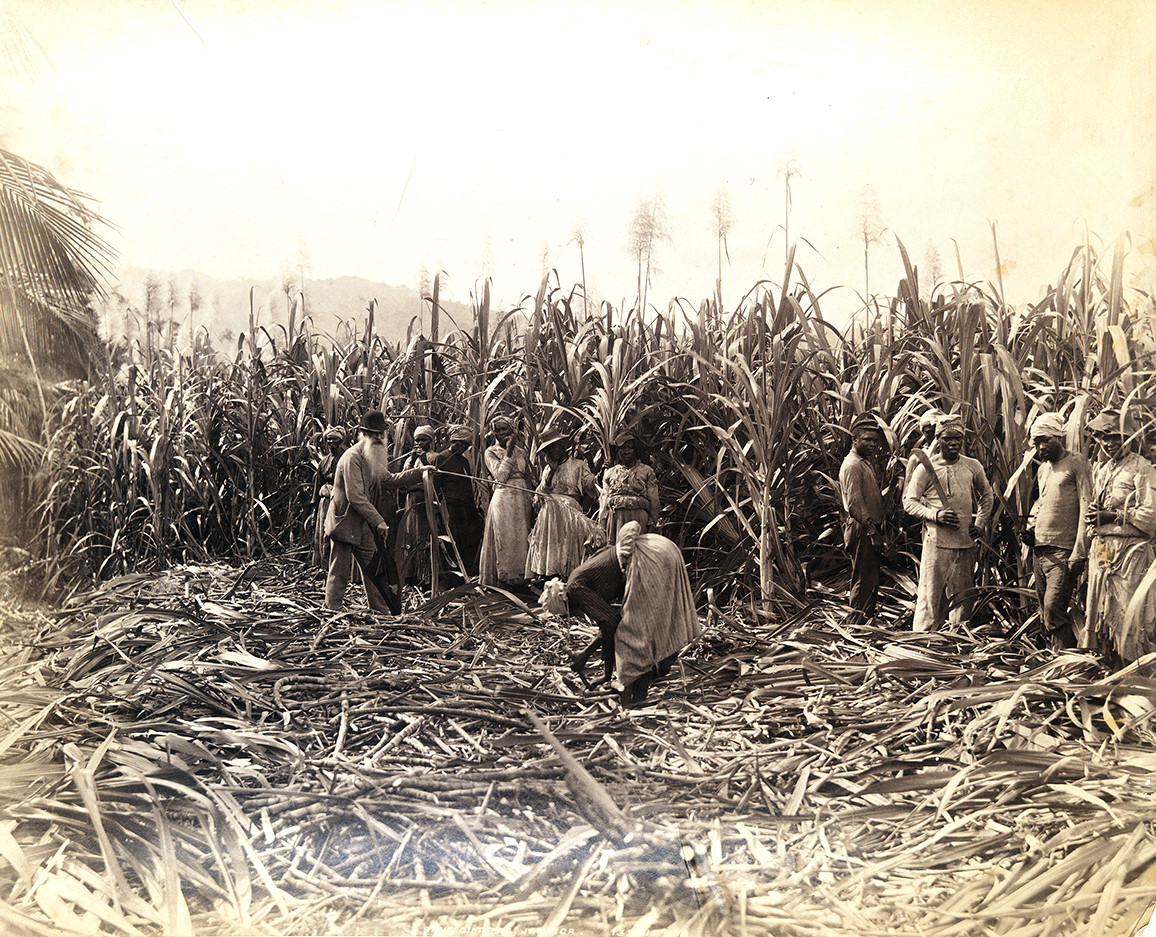
Cane Cutters in Jamaica in the 1890s. Anonymous.

This is a list of plantations and pens in Jamaica by county and parish including historic parishes that have since been merged with modern ones. Plantations produced crops, such as sugar cane and coffee, while livestock pens produced animals for labour on plantations and for consumption. Both industries used the forced labour of enslaved peoples.

James Robertson's map of Jamaica, published in 1804 based on a survey of 1796–99, identified 814 sugar plantations and around 2,500 pens or non-sugar plantations.

== Cornwall County ==
=== Hanover ===
- Axe and Adze
- Bachelor's Hall
- Betsy Mount
- Caldwell
- Chester Castle
- Comfort Hall
- Cousins Cove
- Cottage
- Haughton Court
- Haughton Grove
- Haughton Hall
- Haughton Tower
- Hopewell (Bucknor's)
- Prospect
- Knockalva
- Retirement
- Rock Springs
- Salt Spring
- Saxham
- Tryall

=== Saint Elizabeth ===
- Appleton
- Chocolate Hole
- Mount Charles

=== Saint James ===
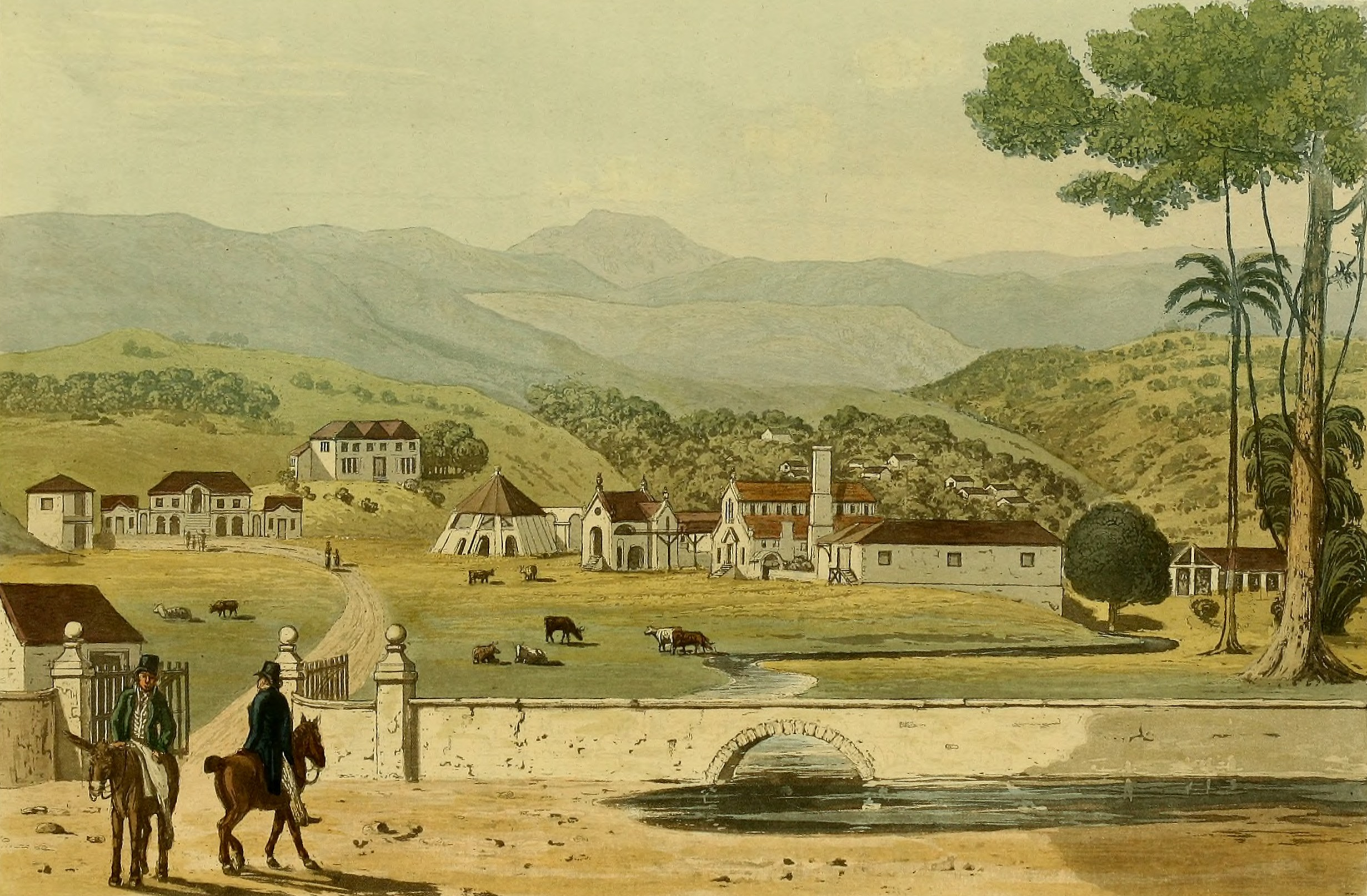
"Montpelier" by James Hakewill, 1820–21.

- Cinnamon Hill
- Kensington Estate
- Old Montpelier

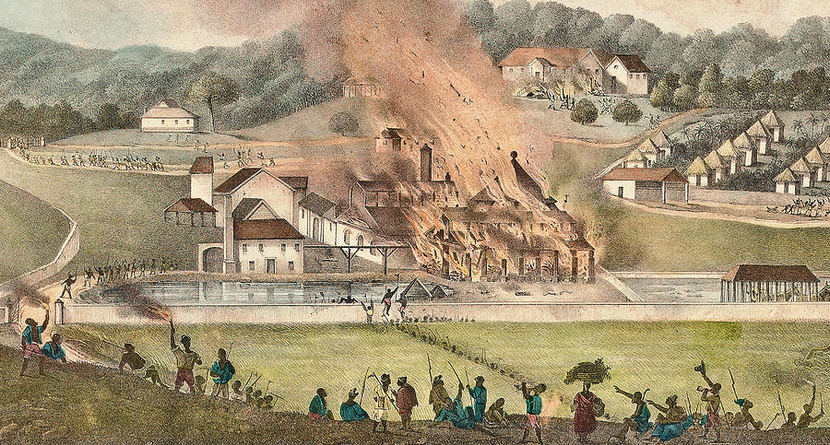
The Destruction of Roehampton Estate in the parish of St. James's in January 1832 the property of J. Baillie Esq. Lithograph, Adolphe Duperly, Jamaica 1833.

- Roehampton

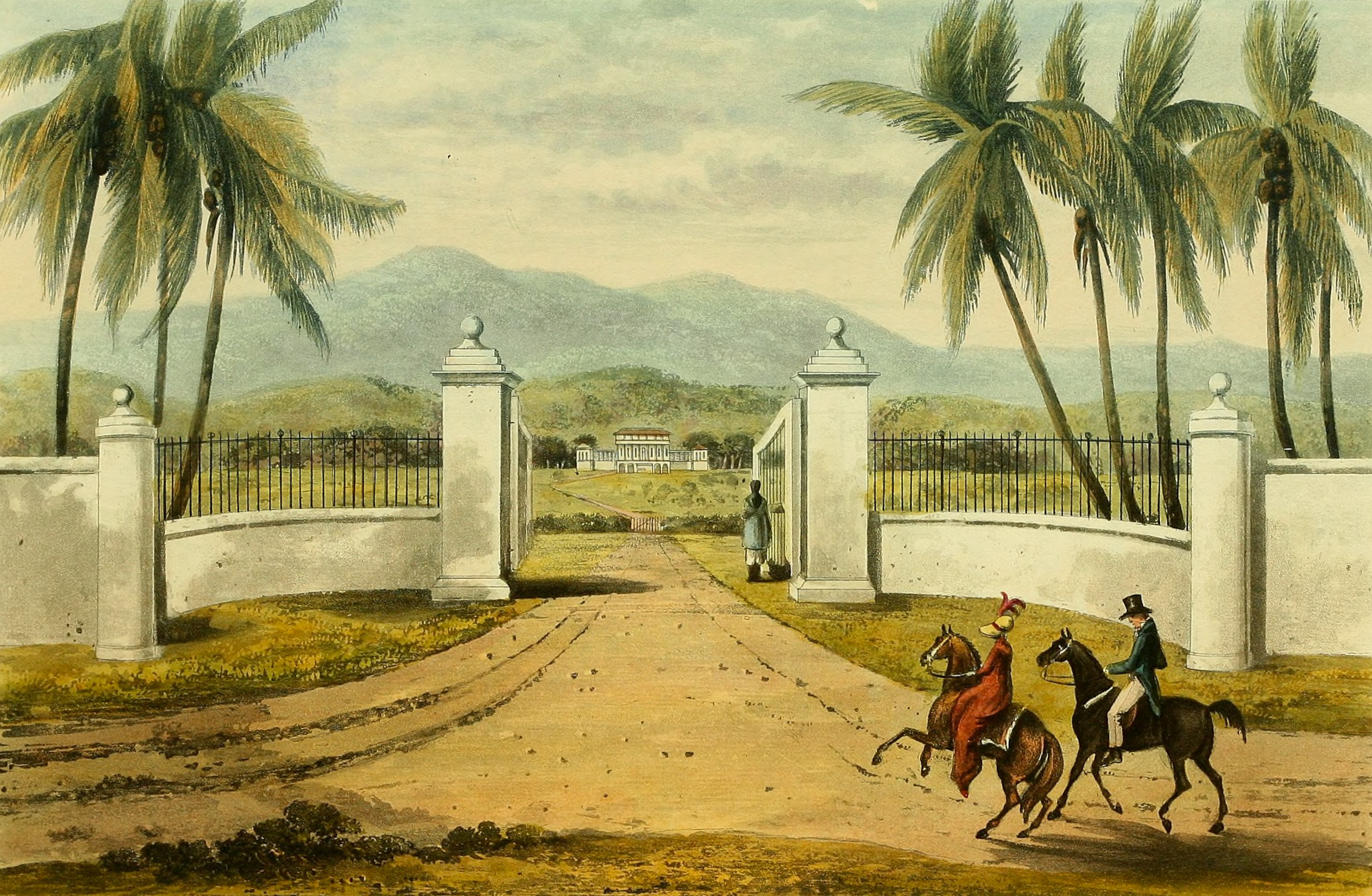
"Rose Hall" by James Hakewill, 1820–21.

- Rose Hall
- Running Gut
- Spring Vale Pen

=== Trelawny ===
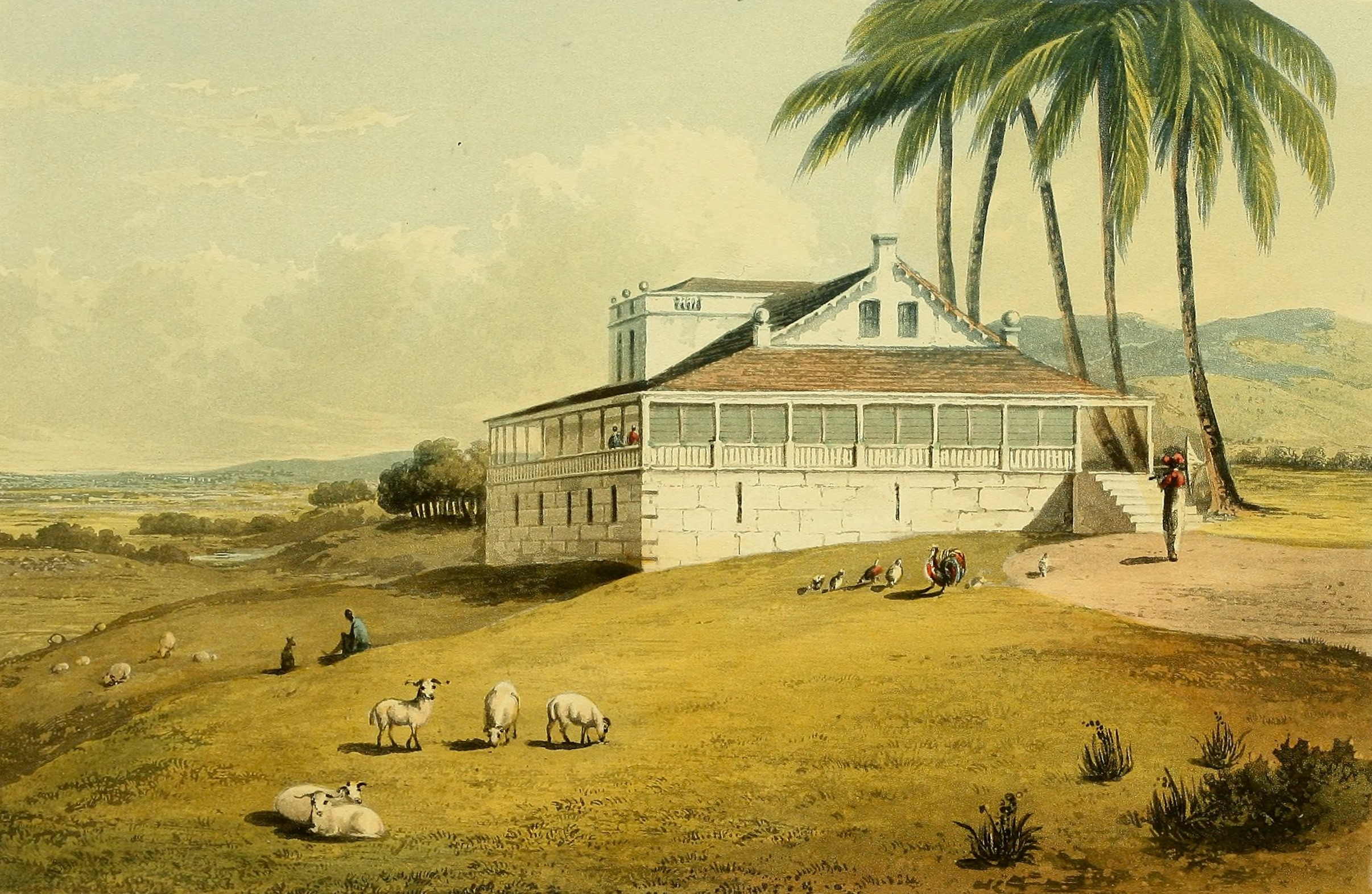
"Bryan Castle Great House" by James Hakewill, 1820–21.

- Bryan Castle
- Green Park Estate, Jamaica (known as Green Pond prior to 1764)
- Good Hope
- Long Pond Estate
- Windsor Estate

=== Westmoreland ===
- Blackheath
- Friendship and Greenwich
- George's Plain
- Mesopotamia
- Midgeham

== Middlesex County ==
=== Clarendon ===
- Pindar's Valley
- Endeavor

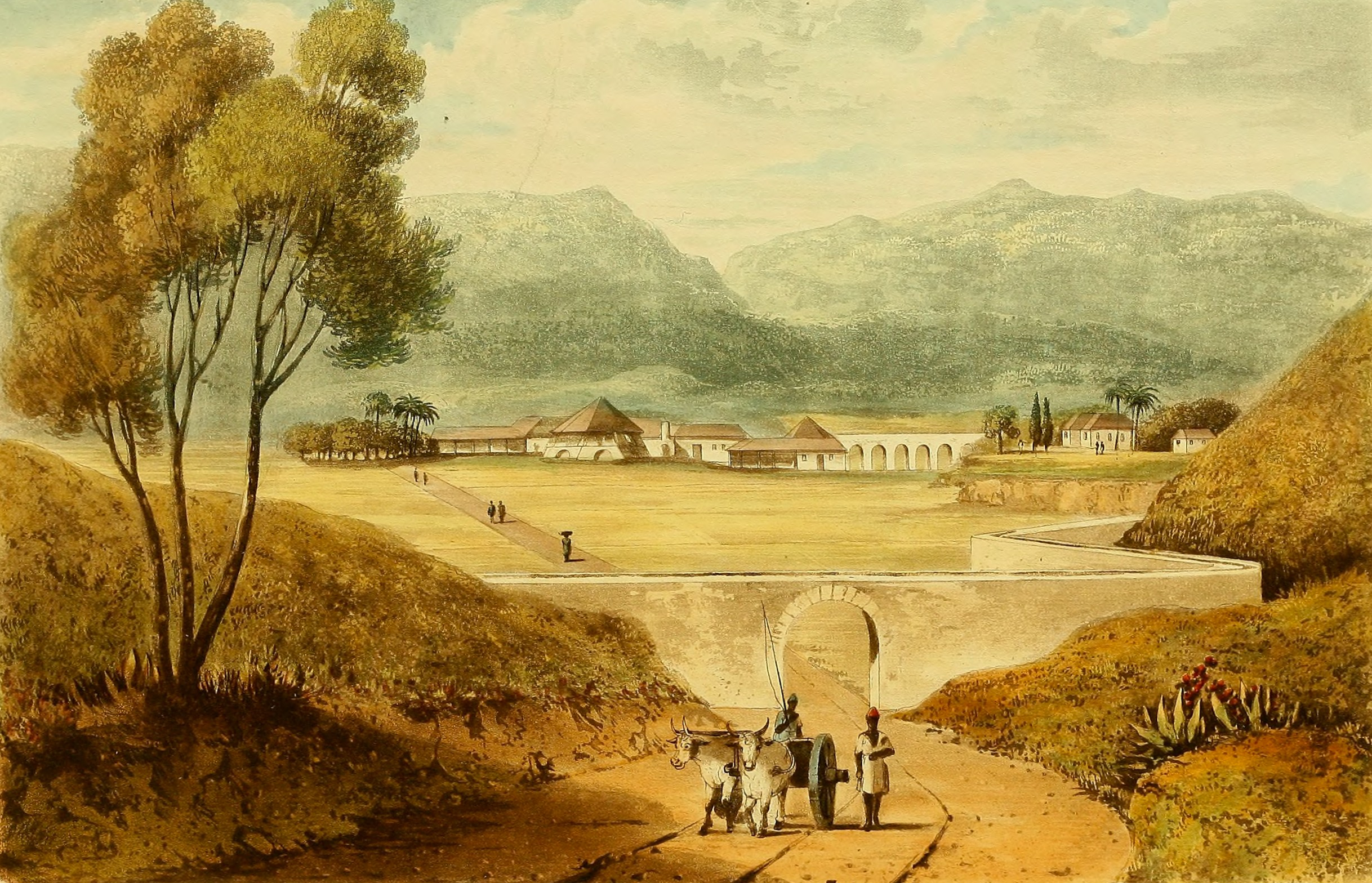
"Whitney Estate" by James Hakewill, 1820–21.

- Whitney

=== Manchester ===
Spring Grove

Green Mount

=== Metcalfe (Now in Saint Mary) ===
Come See- Coffee Plantation.

=== Saint Ann ===
- Antrim
- Cardiff Hall
- Colliston
- Egypt
- Grier Park
- Minard
- Dunbarton

=== Saint Catherine ===
- Spring Garden

=== Saint John ===
(now in Saint Catherine)

- Guanaboa Vale

=== Saint Mary ===
- Albion
- Bayly's Vale
- Brimmer Hall
- Frontier
- Harmony Hall
- Nonsuch

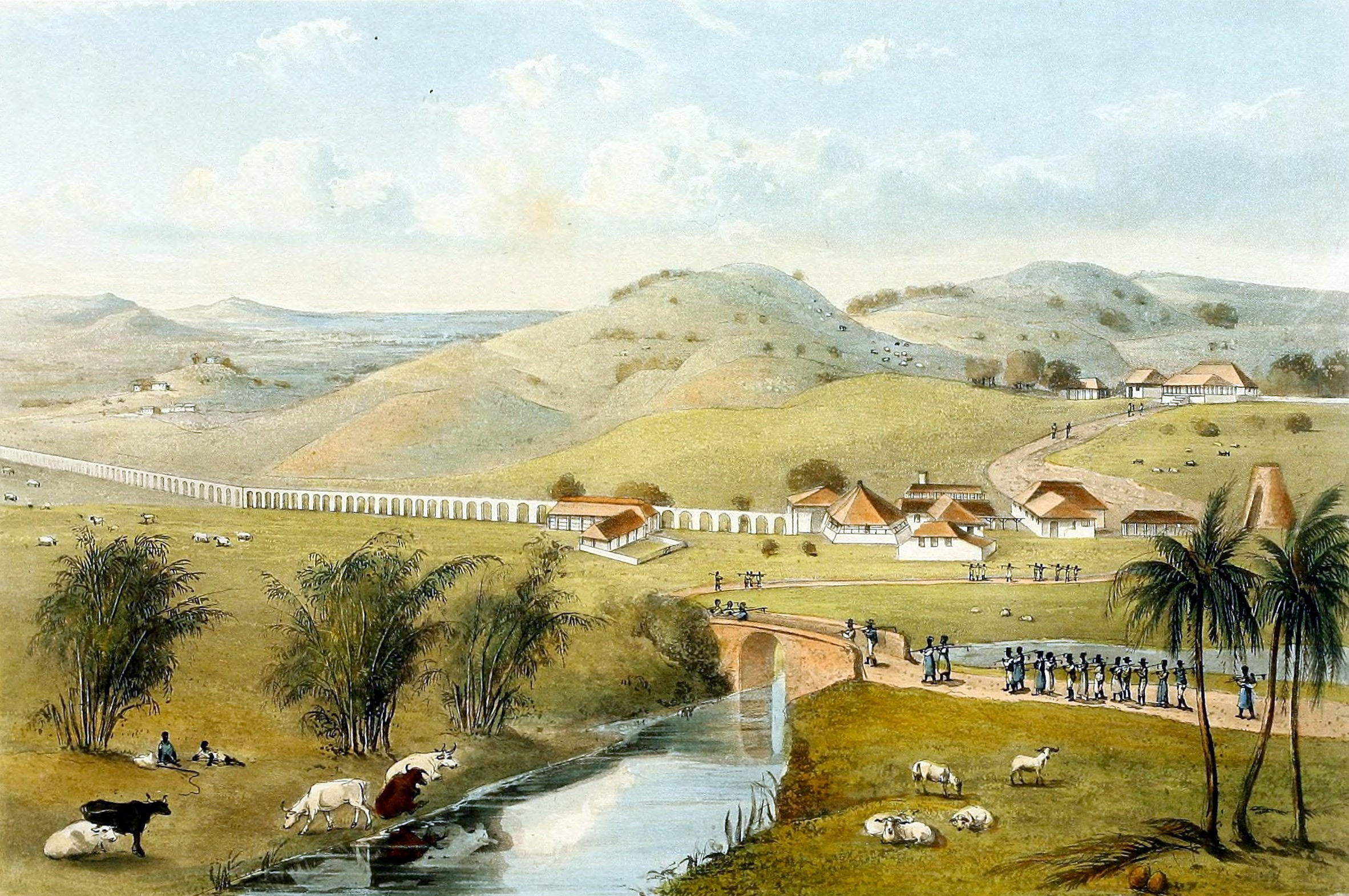
"Trinity Estate, St. Mary's" by James Hakewill, 1820–21.

- Trinity
- Tryall
- Unity
- Whitehall

=== Saint Thomas in the Vale ===
(now in Saint Catherine)

- Grays
- Tulloch
- Newport Lodge

=== Vere ===
(now in Clarendon)

== Surrey County ==
=== Portland ===
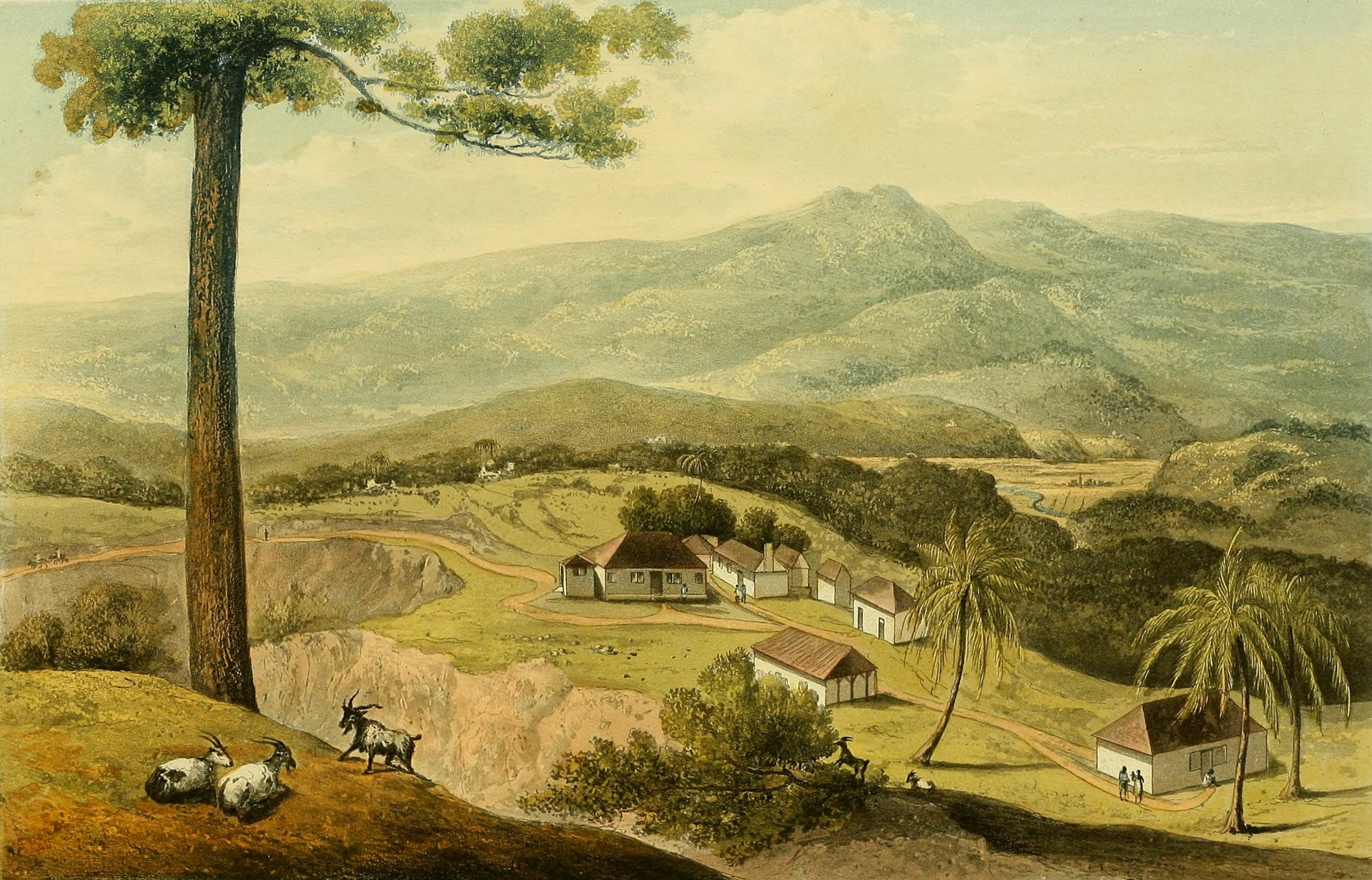
"Golden Vale" by James Hakewill, 1820–21.

- Golden Vale

=== Port Royal ===
(now divided between Kingston and Saint Andrew)

- Mavis Bank

=== Saint Andrew ===
- Constant Spring
- Hampstead Park
- Hope Estate
- Middleton

=== Saint David ===
(Now in Saint Thomas)

- Abbey Green
- Ayton
- Aeolus Valley Estate
- Albion
- Arntully
- Moy Hall
- Spring Garden
- Swamps

=== Saint George ===
(now divided between Saint Mary and Portland)

- Rodney Hall

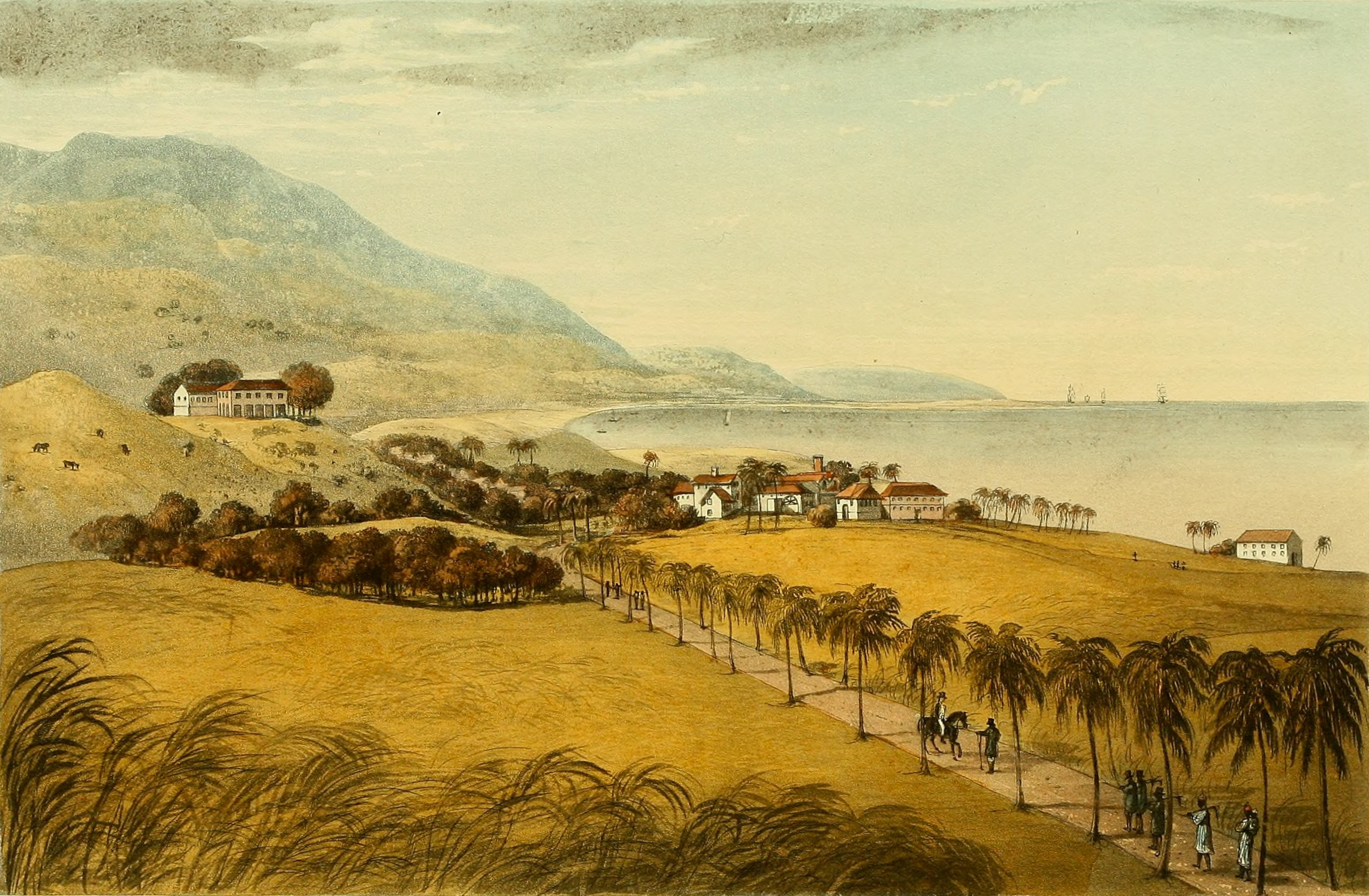
"Spring Garden Estate, St. George's" by James Hakewill, 1820–21.

- Spring Garden

=== Saint Thomas (Saint Thomas in the East) ===
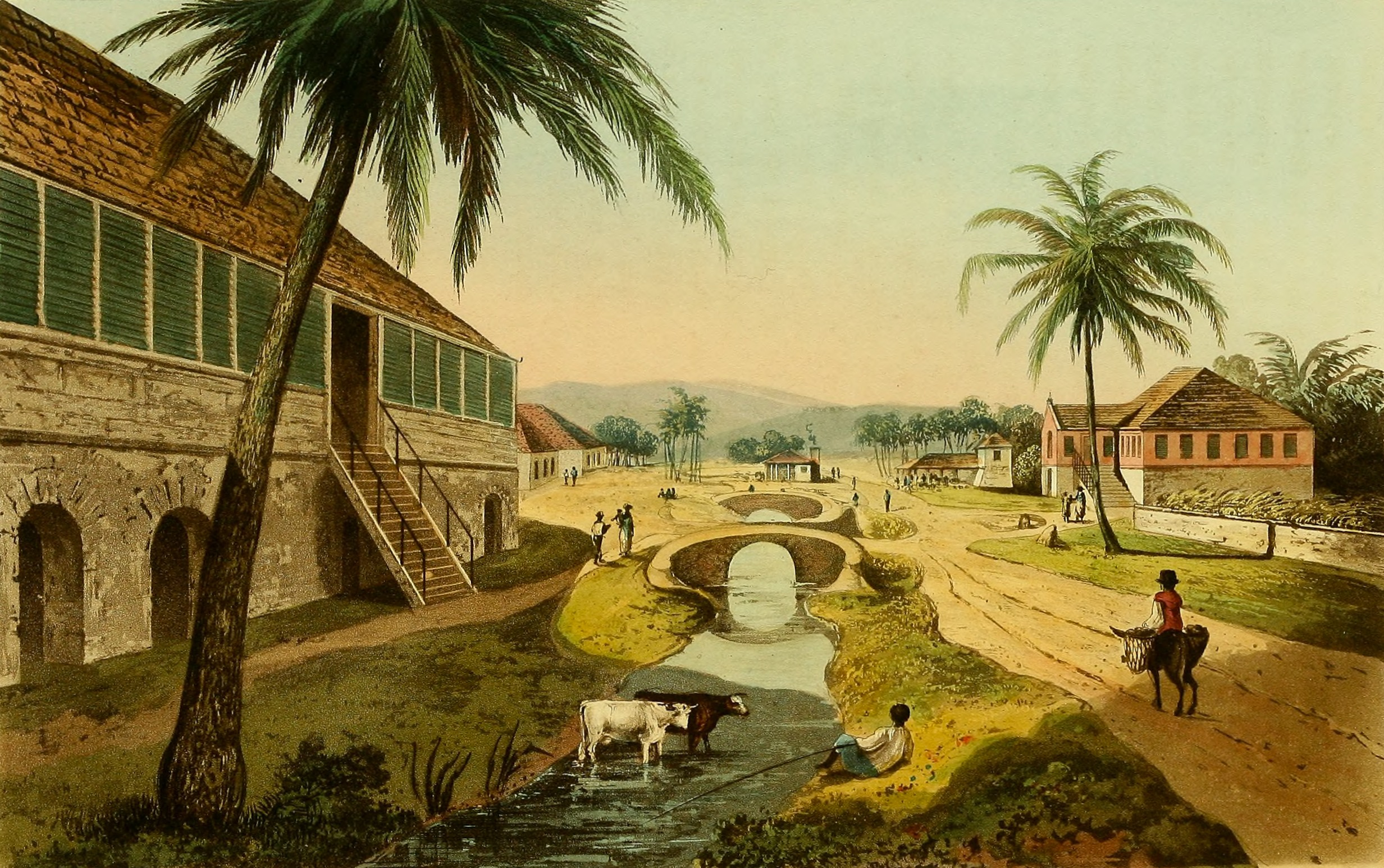
"Holland Estate" by James Hakewill, 1820–21.

- Holland
- Rhine

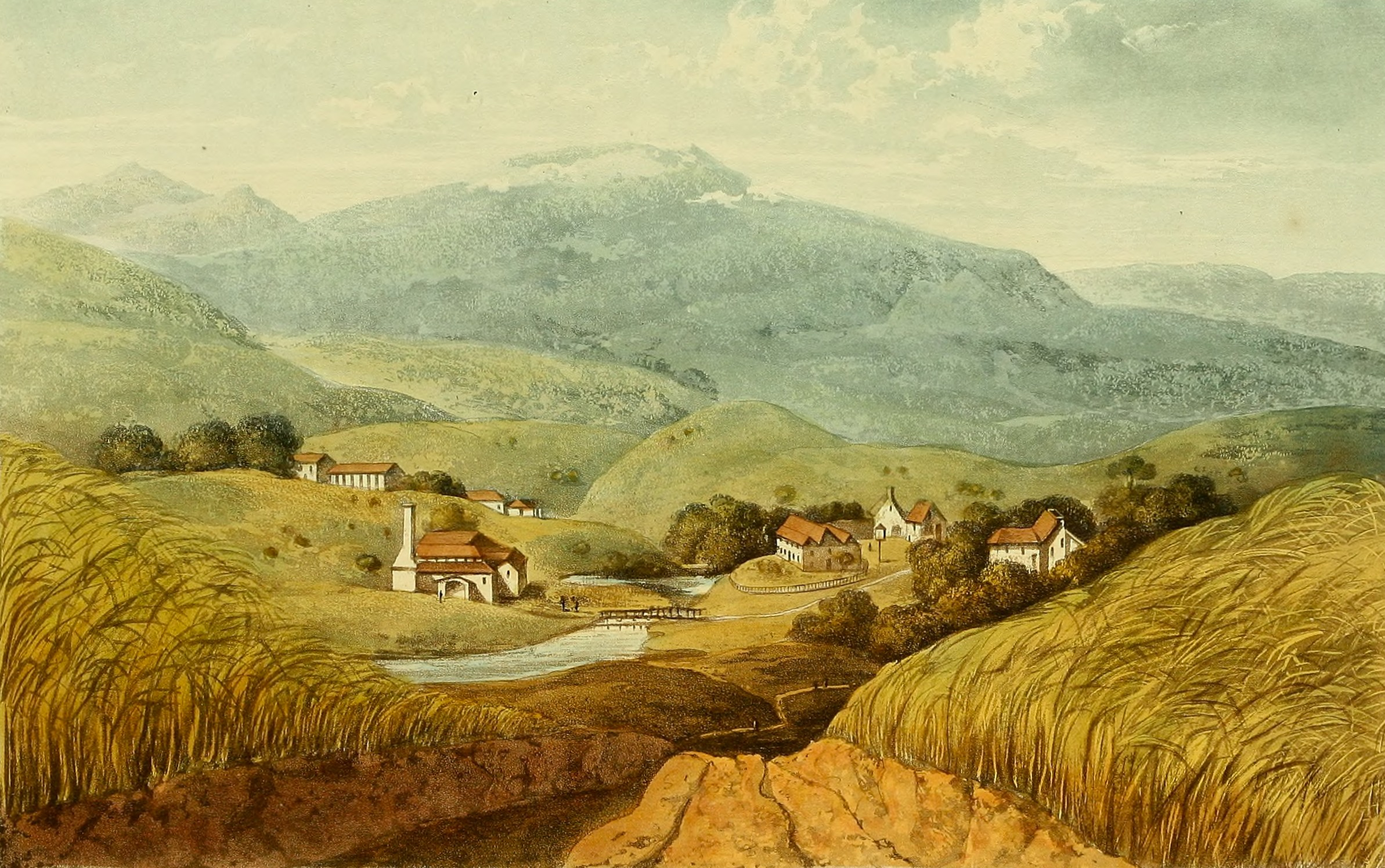
"Williamsfield" by James Hakewill, 1820–21.

- Richmond Vale
- Williamsfield
- Wilson's Gap

== See also ==
- List of plantation great houses in Jamaica
- History of Jamaica
- Slavery in Jamaica
- Slave plantation
