= Rodney Hall plantation =

Plantation in Jamaica

Rodney Hall plantation was located near Hope Bay in the Jamaican parish of Saint George in what is now Portland Parish. In 1809 it was in the ownership of Henry Passley who owned 140 slaves, the number rising to as high as 287 in the 1820s under different ownership. After Henry Passley, the plantation was owned by other Passleys, the Philips family, and in 1839 George Codrington. The Rodney Hall Workhouse was notorious amongst anti-slavery campaigners for its poor conditions.

The name survives as a small community that is the location of the Rodney Hall Basic school.

== See also ==
- List of plantations in Jamaica
