= St John Desmond Arcedeckne-Butler =

British Army general (1896–1959)

Major-General St John Desmond Arcedeckne-Butler CBE
- Arcedeckne-Butler in 1944
- Born: 30 November 1896; Dickoya, Ceylon
- Died: 4 February 1959 (aged 62); County Wexford, Ireland
- Relatives: Baron Dunboyne
- Military career
- Allegiance: United Kingdom
- Branch: British Army
- Service years: 1915–1946
- Rank: Major-General
- Service number: 10309
- Units: Royal Munster Fusiliers; Royal Sussex Regiment; Royal Corps of Signals
- Commands: Signals Experimental Establishment
- Conflicts: First World War; Second World War
- Awards: Commander of the Order of the British Empire; Legion of Honour (France)

Major-General St John Desmond Arcedeckne-Butler, CBE (30 November 1896 – 4 February 1959) was a senior British Army officer and head of MI8.

== Military career ==
Educated in the United States and Switzerland, Arcedeckne-Butler entered the Royal Military College, Sandhurst, being commissioned into the Royal Munster Fusiliers in 1915. Serving with distinction in France and Belgium during the First World War, he was decorated with the Légion d'honneur and was one of the two young British Army officers sent to study at the prestigious École Supérieure d'Électricité (Supélec) in Paris at the end of the war.

Arcedeckne-Butler transferred to the Royal Sussex Regiment in 1922 and then to the Royal Corps of Signals in 1923. Between 1934 and 1939, Arcedeckne-Butler served as Superintendent of the Signals Experimental Establishment and as Army Member of the Experimental sub-committee of the Wireless Telegraphy Board. Promoted to colonel in 1938, Arcedeckne-Butler joined the General Staff at the War Office in 1940 and, promoted major-general (temporary), served as Deputy Director-General of the Ministry of Supply between 1941 and 1946.

Arcedeckne-Butler was appointed a Commander of the Order of the British Empire in the 1946 New Year Honours, retiring from the British Army the same year. He later became a Director of Romary & Co. Ltd, Thermionic Products Ltd and other companies as well as a member of the Broadcasting Advisory Committee, Eire.

== Family ==
Scion of the Irish Butler dynasty, his great-great-grandfather was the 13th Baron Dunboyne (1780–1850). His father, St John Henry Arcedeckne-Butler (1868–1914) married in 1896 Maud, daughter of Captain Albert Money, late Royal Canadian Rifle Regiment, of Little Stodham House, Liss, Hampshire, and sister of Brigadier-General Noel Money.

In 1929 he married Ethel Helen Nesbitt Walker (1905–1953), daughter of Colonel Reginald Selby Walker (killed in action 1918), having two sons and a daughter:

- Major St John Patrick Arcedeckne-Butler, Royal Signals, born 1930, married 1956 Jane (died 1983), daughter of Lieutenant-Colonel Frank Eric Massie, having issue.
- Lieutenant-Commander Michael Francis Peel Arcedeckne-Butler, born 1933, married 1961 Jacqueline, daughter of Colonel George Leonard Carpenter-Garnier, High Sheriff of Hampshire (1967), having issue,
  - Timothy Garnier Arcedeckne-Butler, born 1962, married 1995 Nathalie, younger daughter of Muhammad Rawoo FCCA, having issue including an elder daughter, Emily Arcedeckne-Butler (born 1996), who became engaged in 2023 to marry Sam Gueterbock, heir-in-line to the barony of Berkeley.
  - Nicola Catherine Arcedeckne-Butler, Master of Wine, born 1964, married 1996 Jonathan Longden, and has issue.
- Christal Synolda Arcedeckne-Butler, born 1938, married 1961 Geoffrey William Medcalf JP (died 2009), having issue.

The Arcedeckne-Butlers are in remainder to the Dunboyne peerage title.

== Arms ==
Coat of arms of St John Desmond Arcedeckne-Butler
Notes Exemplified to James Henry Edward Butler Esq, son of the Hon. St John Butler, by Anna Maria his wife, only daughter and heiress of Walter Arcedeckne Burke Esq, of Gortnamona, County Galway, upon assuming by Royal Licence, 4th November 1867, the additional surname of Arcedeckne. Crest 1st, out of a Ducal Coronet Or, a Plume of five Ostrich Feathers therefrom a Demi-Falcon rising Argent a Label on a Crescent for difference (for BUTLER); 2nd, a Cubit Arm erect vested Argent charged with three Chevronels Sable the Hand Proper grasping a Sword Argent pommel and hilt Or (for ARCEDECKNE). Escutcheon Quarterly, 1st and 4th, Or, a chief indented Azure three Escallops in bend counterchanged, a Label on a Crescent for difference (for BUTLER); 2nd and 3rd, Argent, three Chevronels Sable (for ARCEDECKNE). Motto TIMOR DOMINI FONS VITAE Orders The Circlet of the Order of the British Empire

== See also ==
- List of British generals and brigadiers

== Bibliography ==
- Smart, Nick (2005). Biographical Dictionary of British Generals of the Second World War. Barnesley: Pen & Sword. ISBN 1844150496.
