= Hermann Trautschold =

German-Russian geologist and paleontologist (1817–1902)

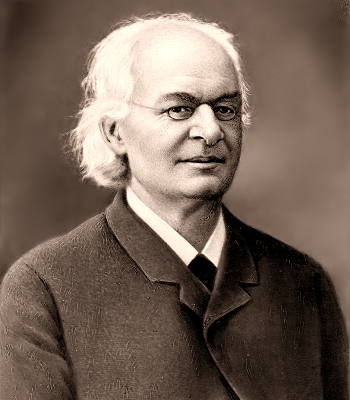
- Gustav Heinrich Ludwig Hermann Trautschold
- Born: 17 September 1817; Berlin, Kingdom of Prussia
- Died: 22 October 1902 (aged 85); Karlsruhe, German Empire
- Resting place: Heidelberg
- Other name: Russian: Ге́рман Адо́льфович Траутшо́льд
- Citizenship: German Empire, Russian Empire
- Education: University of Giessen
- Scientific career
- Fields: geology and paleontology
- Workplaces: University of Giessen; Petrovsky Agricultural and Forestry Academy
- Doctoral advisor: Justus von Liebig

Notes
- His brother Wilhelm Trautschold was a painter.

Gustav Heinrich Ludwig Hermann Trautschold (Russian: Ге́рман Адо́льфович Траутшо́льд, tr. Gérman Adólʹfovich Trautshólʹd; 17 September 1817 – October 22, 1902) was a German-Russian geologist and paleontologist and also pharmacist. From 1869 to 1888 he was a professor at the Petrovsky Agricultural and Forestry Academy. Trautschold was known as a specialist in the paleontology and stratigraphy of Carboniferous, Jurassic and Cretaceous deposits of the European part of Russia. He was brother of painter Wilhelm Trautschold.

== Life ==
Hermann Gustav Heinrich Ludwig Trautschold was born on September 17, 1817, in Berlin, in the family of the Berlin merchant Adolph Christoph Ludwig Trautschold and Maria Charlotte Wilhelmine Trautschold (née Müller). He graduated from primary school in Spandau and a grammar school in Berlin. In 1844, Trautschold made a trip to Spain, during which he studied botanical research, and then moved to the University of Giessen, where he studied chemistry, mineralogy and crystallography in depth; He showed special interest in geology and paleontology. During his studies in Giessen, Trautschold worked for about one and a half years as an assistant in the laboratory of Justus von Liebig 1844–1845. In 1847, after completing his studies, he obtained a doctorate in philosophy from the University of Giessen.

== Career ==
In 1847–1849 Trautschold traveled to Italy, Germany and Russia, where he was engaged in geological research. During his stay in Russia, he settled for a time as a home teacher in the family of the landowner of Kostroma Province, Fyodor N. Luginin, who lived in Moscow at that time, whom he had met in Germany (one of Trautschold's students, Vladimir Luginin, later became a major physicist, professor at Moscow University); In Russia, Hermann Trautschold was known as Gérman Adólʹfovich. In 1848 Hermann Trautschold returned to Germany, where in 1849–1857 he was dean of private educational institution in Prussia.

In 1863 he was invited to teach German at the faculties in physics, mathematics and medicine of Moscow University. Over the course of his appointment, Trautschold developed fluency in Russian and engaged in geological research in his spare time.

During his work at the Petrovsky Academy, Trautschold devoted much time to researching the deposits of the Carboniferous and Jurassic periods of the Moscow province, and also repeatedly undertook long-term trips with the purpose of geological survey of the Volga, Ural, Donbas, Crimea and Northern Caucasus regions. Pedagogical work of Trautschold was not limited only to conducting classes and lecturing; He arranged geological excursions for students, took care of replenishing the mineralogical collection of the Petrovsky Academy (which he was in charge of). Some of his geological collections went to Strasbourg and Lisbon, but are no longer preserved. In Russia, much of its collection is in the State Vernadsky Museum of Geology of the Russian Academy of Sciences in Moscow. He was a follower of Charles Darwin's theory of evolution and supported it with paleontological finds and his teaching. In Russia he also promoted the Darwinist and paleontologist Vladimir Kovalevsky. He contributed to the recognition of Alexander von Humboldt in Russia.

Faced with the lack of educational manuals on geology in Russian, he created a textbook "Fundamentals of Geology" in three volumes: "Geography and Geomorphy", "Paleontology" and "Stratigraphy".

From 1872 to 1886 he was secretary of the Imperial Society of Natural Scientists in Moscow. In 1884 he became a member of the German National Academy of Sciences Leopoldina. In 1892, he edited an exsiccata-like series of preserved plant specimens collected by him in Opatija, namely Eine Sammlung getrockneter Pflanzen aus Abbazia. 1894 Honorary member of the Silesian Society for Patriotic Culture and he was a member of the German Geological Society and honorary member of the Belgian Geological Society.

== Death ==
Trautschold died in Karlsruhe on October 22, 1902.

== Memory ==
In honor of G. A. Trautshold, two types of ammonites were named – Acanthohoplites trautscholdi Simonovitsch et al., 1876, Alphachoristites trautscholdi and Sanmartinoceras (Sinzovia) trautscholdi (Sinzow, 1870)(Cretaceous); species of the brachiopod Zeilleria trautscholdi (Neumayr, 1876) (Jurassic); species of ichthyosaurs Undorosaurus trautscholdi (Jurassic); species of synapsid Vivaxosaurus trautscholdi (Amalitzky 1922) (Perm); two types of horn corals – Lophophyllum trautscholdi (Stuckenberg, 1904) and Stereophrentis trautscholdi (Fomitshev, 1953) (Carboniferous); genus of sea lilies Trautscholdicrinus.

== Works ==
- Hermann Trautschold Übergänge und Zwischenvarietäten Universitäts-Buchdruck 1861
- Hermann Trautschold Ueber säkulare Hebungen und Senkungen der Erdoberfläche Habilitations-Abhandlung Kaiserlich Universität 1869
