= Arntully plantation =

Plantation

Arntully plantation was a coffee plantation in Saint David Parish (now Saint Thomas Parish), Jamaica. In 1834 when the Slavery Abolition Act 1833 came into force, the estate was owned by William Rae of nearby Brook Lodge.
