= Wilhelm Trautschold =

German portrait painter (1815-1877)

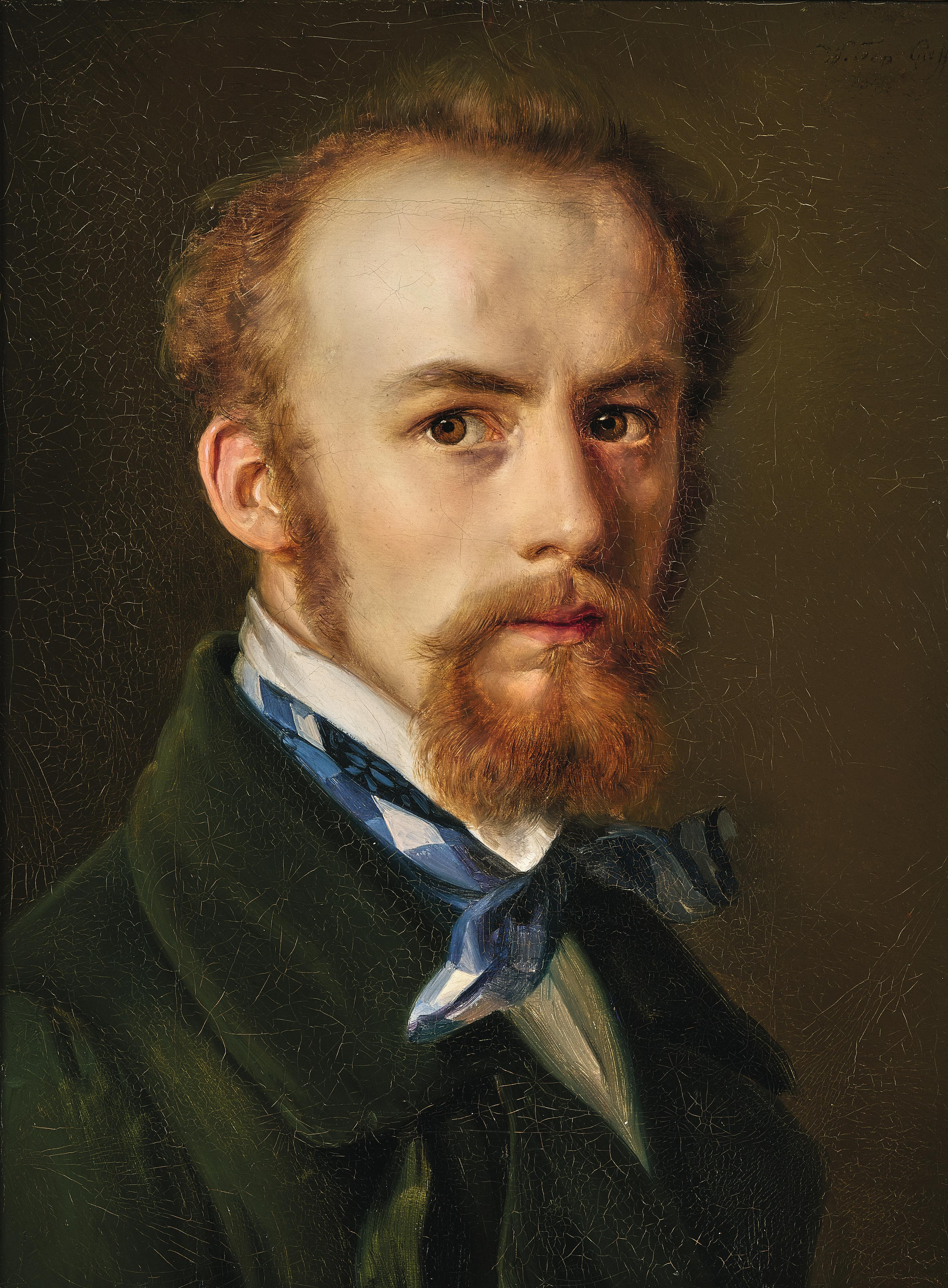
- Self-portrait
- Born: 2 June 1815; Berlin, Kingdom of Prussia
- Died: 7 January 1877 (aged 61); Munich, Kingdom of Bavaria
- Education: Berlin Akademie der Kunste
- Occupation: Portrait painter
- Relatives: Hermann Trautschold

Wilhelm Trautschold (2 June 1815 – 7 January 1877) was a German portrait painter.

Trautschold was born in Berlin on 2 June 1815. He was trained at the Berlin Akademie der Kunste and in Düsseldorf. He lived in London from 1860.

His works are in the collections of the National Portrait Gallery, and the Royal Society of Chemistry. One of his paintings of Justus von Liebig was used on a German 100 Reichsmark note in 1935.

He died in Munich on 7 January 1877. He was brother of paleontologist Hermann Trautschold.

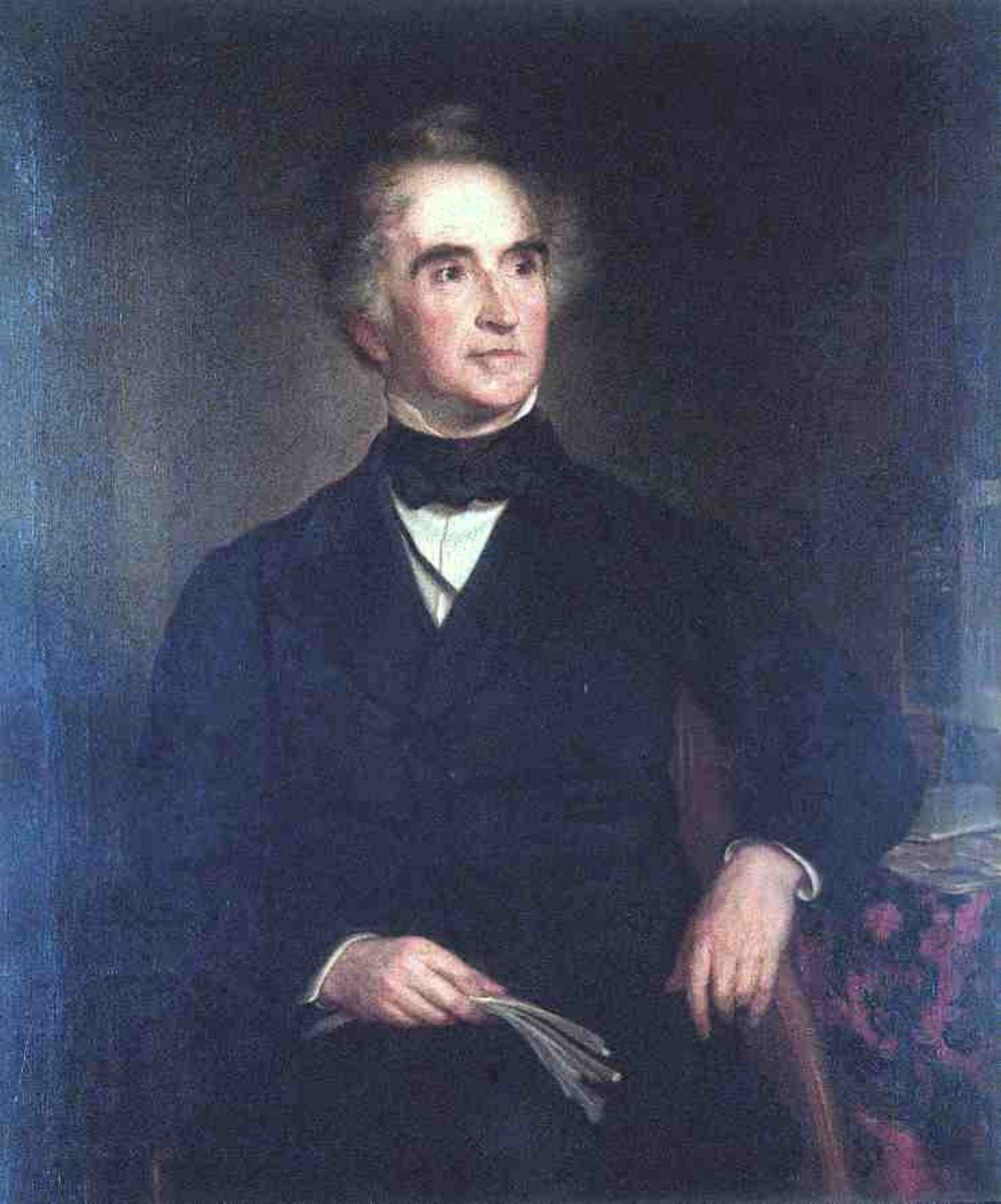
Portrait of Justus von Liebig

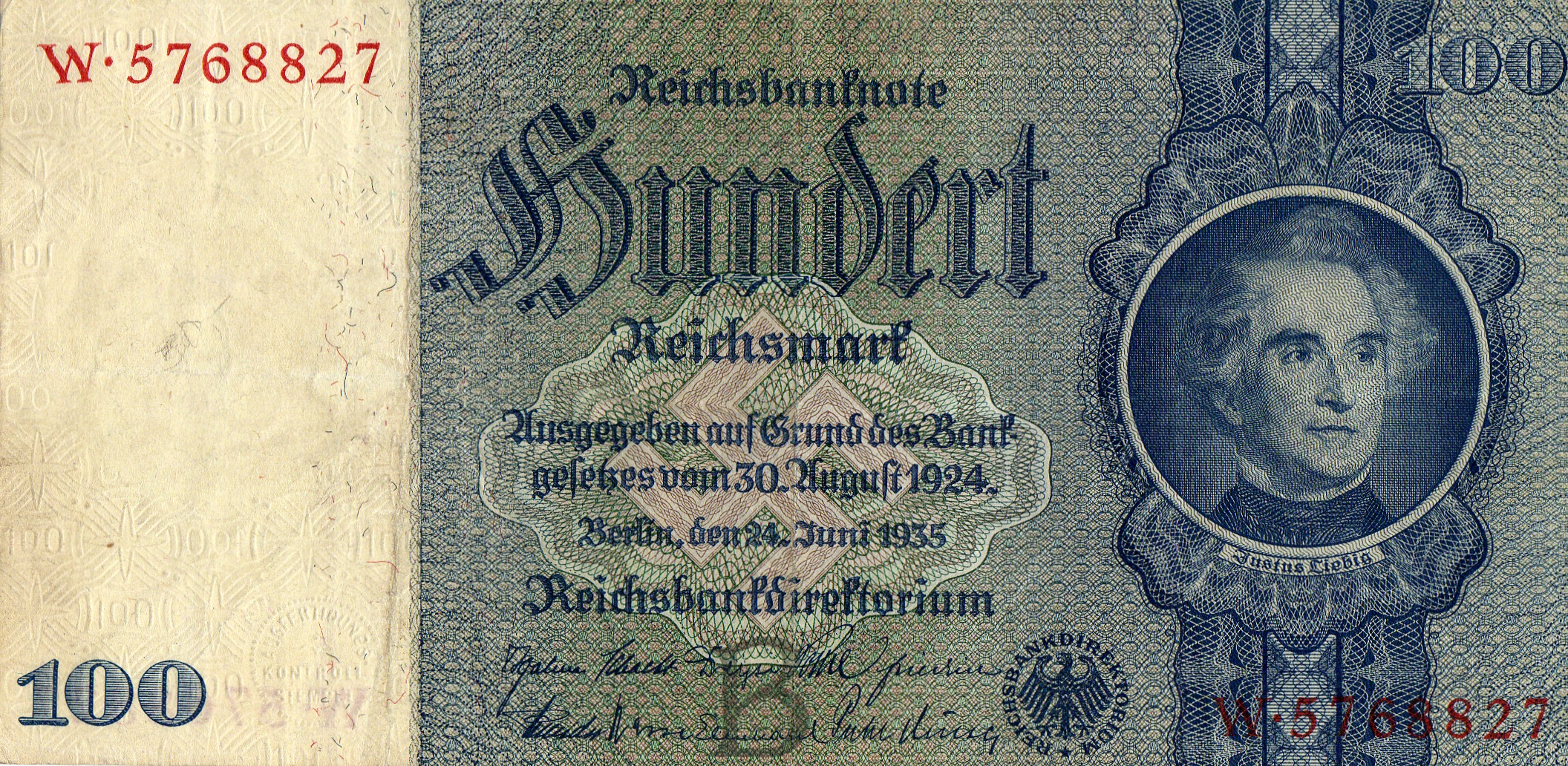
Banknote after the above portrait of Justus von Liebig

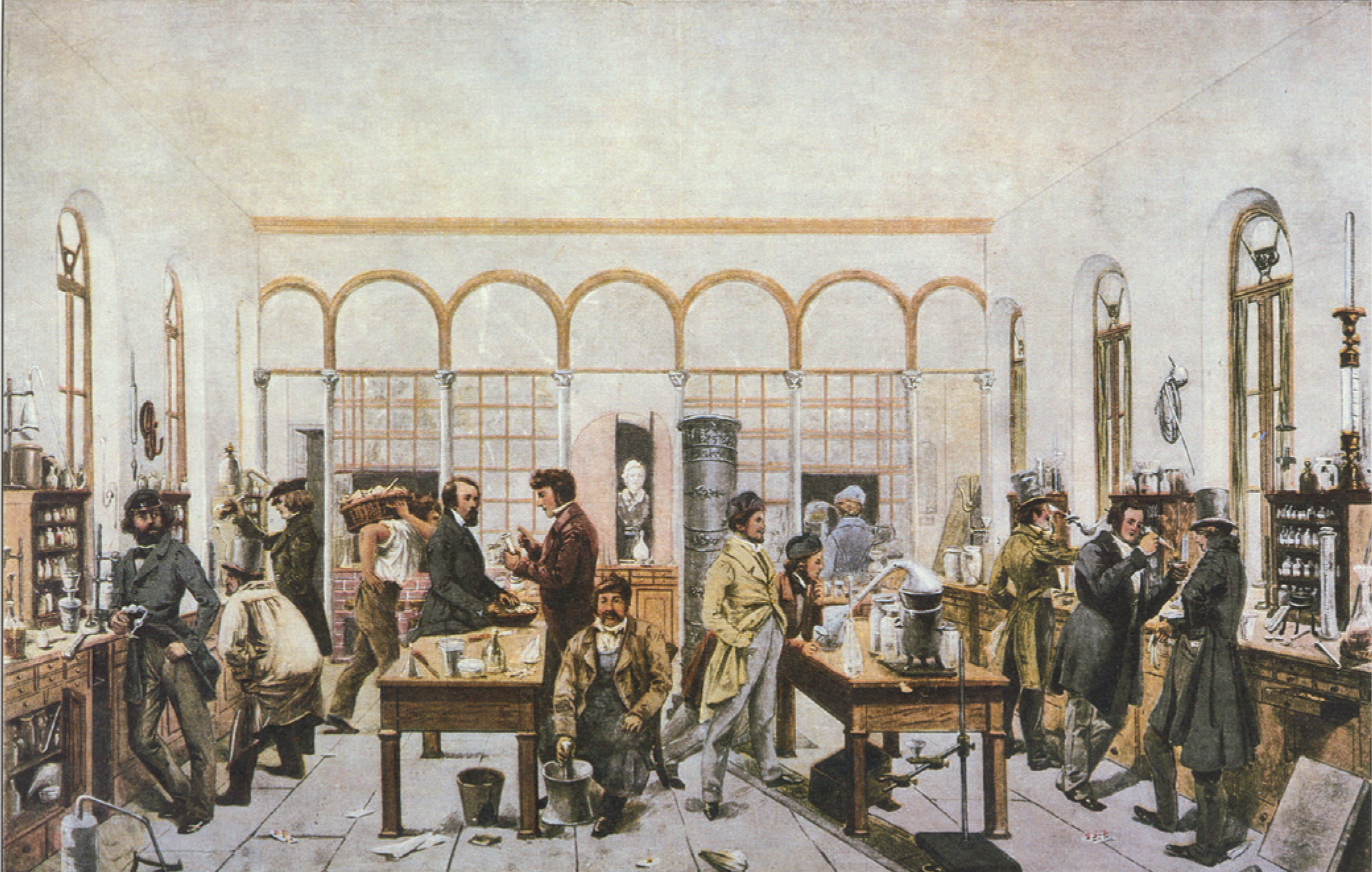
Trautschold liebig laboratorium (1841)

== External references ==
- 6 artworks by or after Wilhelm Trautschold at the Art UK site
