= Robert Arcedekne =

Robert Arcedekne (died 1768) was a planter in Jamaica who sat in the House of Assembly for Saint Ann Parish. He owned over 200 slaves on his plantation in Saint Mary Parish where he also lived.
