= Cabarita River =

Coordinates: 18°13′N 78°10′W

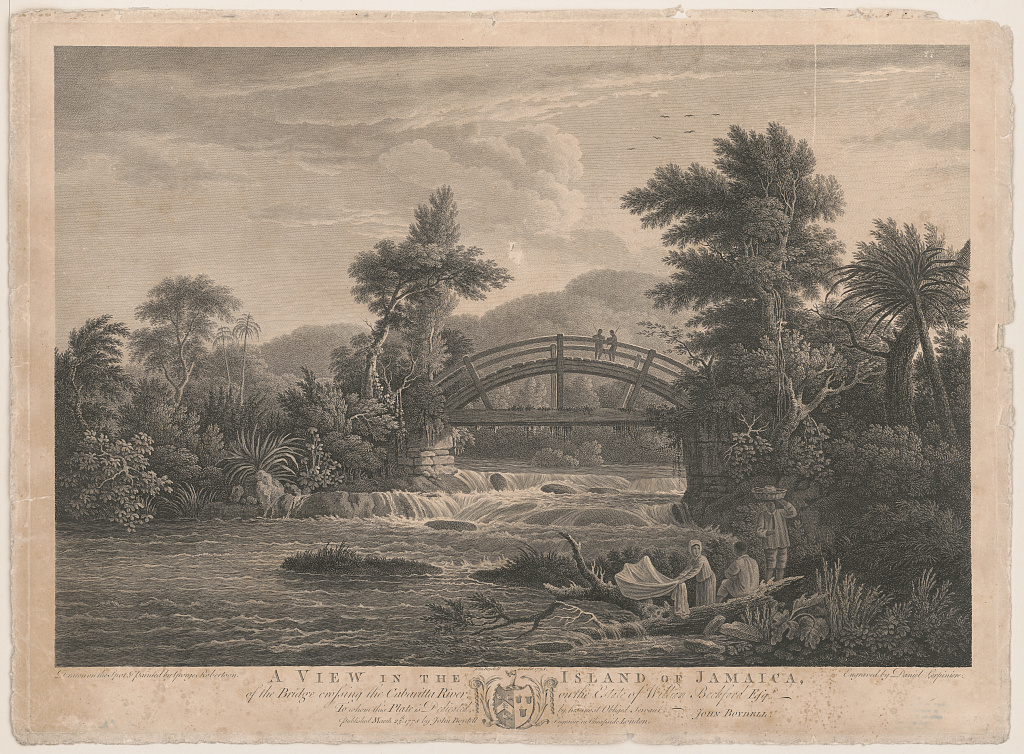
- 1778 print of the Cabarita River by the engraver Daniel Lerpinière

Location
- Country: Jamaica

The Cabarita River, originally the Cabaritta, is a river in Jamaica, located in Westmoreland. The Mayfield River is a tributary.

== See also ==
- List of rivers of Jamaica
