= Nixon (surname) =

Nixon is a surname of English, Scots, or Scots-Irish origin meaning "son of Nicholas". The following is a partial list of well-known persons and fictional characters with this name.

== A–F ==
- Agnes Nixon (1927–2016), American soap opera creator
- Al Nixon (1886–1960), baseball player
- Alfred Westland Nixon (1863–1921), Canadian physician and politician
- Allan Nixon (1915–1995), American actor
- Amy Nixon (born 1977), Canadian curler
- Angie Nixon (born 1984), American politician
- Brad Nixon (born 1949), Canadian politician
- Carl Nixon (born 1967), New Zealand author and playwright
- Christine Nixon (born 1953), former Victorian (Australia) police commissioner
- Colin Nixon (born 1978), Northern Irish footballer
- Colin Nixon, Canadian filmmaker
- Cynthia Nixon (born 1966), American actress
- Dale Nixon, a pseudonym used by several musicians
- David Nixon (disambiguation), multiple people
- Daviyon Nixon (born 1998), American football player
- Derek Lee Nixon (born 1983), American actor
- DeVaughn Nixon (born 1983), American actor
- Donald A. Nixon (born 1950), nephew of President Richard Nixon
- Donald Nixon (1914–1987), brother of President Richard Nixon
- Donell Nixon (born 1961), baseball player
- Drew Nixon (born 1959), American politician
- E. D. Nixon (1899–1987), American civil rights activist
- Edward Nixon (1930–2019), brother of President Richard Nixon
- Edwin Nixon (1925–2008), British businessman, chief executive of IBM UK
- Elmore Nixon (1933–1975), American blues pianist and singer
- Eric Nixon (born 1962), English football goalkeeper
- Francis Nixon (disambiguation), multiple people

== G–L ==
- Gary Nixon (1941–2011), American motorcycle racer
- George Nixon (disambiguation), several people
- Gilbert Edward James Nixon (1905–1987), British entomologist
- Gordon Nixon (born 1957), Canadian banker
- Hammie Nixon (1908–1984), American blues musician
- Hannah Milhous Nixon (1885–1967), mother of President Richard Nixon
- Harold Nixon (1909–1933), brother of President Richard Nixon
- Harry Nixon (1891–1961), Canadian politician
- Henry Nixon (born c. 1970), Australian actor
- Howard Nixon (1909–1983), British librarian
- James Nixon (disambiguation), several people
- Jay Nixon (born 1956), American politician, former Governor of Missouri
- Jeff Nixon (born 1956), American football player
- Jennie Coldwell Nixon (1839-1917), American educator
- Jerren Nixon (born 1973), Trinidad and Tobago footballer
- Joan Lowery Nixon (1927–2003), American writer
- John Nixon (disambiguation), numerous people
- Joseph Nixon (1896–1977), English footballer
- Julie Nixon Eisenhower (born 1948), younger daughter of President Richard and Pat Nixon
- Kay Nixon Kathleen Irene Blundell née Nixon (1894–1988), English artist and illustrator
- Keisean Nixon (born 1997), American football player
- Kiden Nixon, fictional character from Marvel Comics
- Kimberley Nixon (born 1985), British actress
- Larry Nixon (born 1950), American professional fisherman
- Lewis Nixon (disambiguation), several people
- Livinia Nixon (born 1975), Australian actress
- Lucille Nixon (1908–1963), American poet who wrote in Japanese

== M–Z ==
- Marian Nixon (1904–1983), American movie actress born Marja Nissinen
- Marmaduke Nixon (1814–1864), New Zealand politician and soldier
- Marni Nixon (1930–2016), American singer
- Matthew Nixon (born 1989), English golfer
- Mike Nixon (1911–2000), American football player
- Mojo Nixon (1957–2024), American psychobilly musician
- Nicholas Nixon (born 1947), American photographer
- Nick Nixon (1939–2013), American country singer/songwriter
- Norm Nixon (born 1955), American basketball player
- Otis Nixon (born 1959), American baseball player
- Pat Nixon (1912–1993), wife of President Richard Nixon
- Paul Nixon (footballer) (born 1963), English-born New Zealand footballer
- Paul Nixon (born 1970), English cricketer
- Peter Nixon (1928–2025), Australian politician and businessman
- Peter Nixon (rugby union) (born 1984), New Zealand former rugby union player
- Phill Nixon (1956–2013), English darts player
- Richard Nixon (1913–1994), 37th president of the United States
- Richard Nixon (footballer) (1965–1992), Australian rules footballer
- Richard Nixon (Montana politician) (1901–1975), American politician
- Ricky Nixon (born 1963), Australian rules footballer
- Robert Nixon (disambiguation), several people
- Roger Nixon (1921–2009), American composer and musician
- Ron Nixon, American journalist
- Ronald Nixon (1898–1965), British-born Hindu spiritual teacher
- Russ Nixon (1935–2016), American baseball player and manager
- S. Frederick Nixon (1860–1905), American businessman and politician
- Sam Nixon (born 1986), contestant on Pop Idol
- Samuel A. Nixon (born 1958), American politician
- Tebeng Nixon T. (born 1983), Cameroonian Biomedical and research scientist
- Thomas Nixon (disambiguation), several people
- Toby Nixon (born c. 1950), American politician
- Tre Nixon (born 1998), American football player
- Tricia Nixon Cox (born 1946), elder daughter to Richard and Pat Nixon
- Trot Nixon (born 1974), American baseball player
- Vivian Nixon (born 1984), American dancer
- Walter Nixon (born 1928), American judge
- Willard Nixon (1928–2000), American baseball player
- William Penn Nixon (1832–1912), American publisher

== Fictional characters ==
- Bella Nixon, in the Australian soap opera Home and Away
- Nick Nixon (Neighbours), in the Australian soap opera Neighbours
- Noah Nixon, a character from the cartoon series Generator Rex
- Samantha Nixon, in the British television series The Bill

== See also ==
- Nixon (disambiguation)
