= Nixon (disambiguation) =

Richard Nixon (1913–1994) was the 37th president of the United States from 1969 to 1974.

Nixon may also refer to:

== Places ==
Canada

- Nixon, Ontario, a hamlet

United States

- Nixon, Nevada, a US census-designated place
- Nixon, New Jersey, an unincorporated community
- Nixon, Pennsylvania, a US census-designated place
- Nixon, Texas, a city
- Nixon Township, DeWitt County, Illinois
- Lake Nixon, a lake and private recreation area near Little Rock, Arkansas
- Nixon Fire, a fire in California
- Nixon Lake, a lake in Minnesota

== Arts and entertainment ==
- Nixon (film), a 1995 American drama film, directed by Oliver Stone
- Nixon: Ruin and Recovery, 1973–1990, a 1991 book by Stephen Ambrose
- The Nixons, an American rock band
- Nixon (album), a 2000 album by Lambchop
- Frost/Nixon (film), a 2008 historical drama film

== Other uses ==
- Nixon (surname), a list of people and fictional characters with that name
- Nixon Nitration Works, a group of plants near New Brunswick, New Jersey, site of a disastrous explosion and fire
- Nixon (company), American company for watches, accessories and audio

== See also ==
- Nixon Doctrine, also known as the Guam Doctrine, put forth on July 25, 1969 by President Richard Nixon and later formalized in his speech on Vietnamization of the Vietnam War
- Nixon Peabody, a US law firm
- Nickson, a surname
