= Albion plantation =

Sugar plantation in Saint Thomas Parish, Jamaica

Coordinates: 17°53′9″N 76°36′24″W

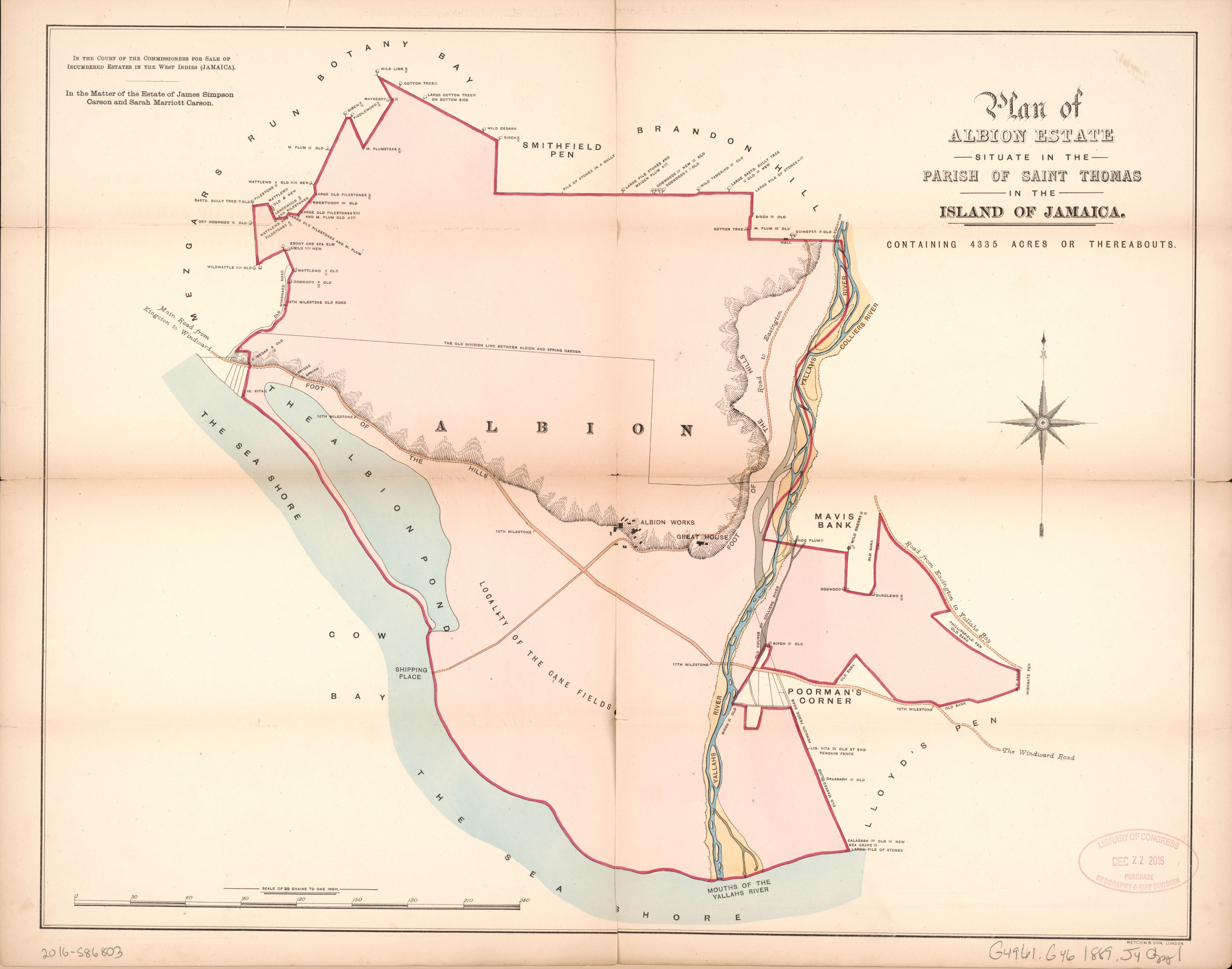
1889 map of Albion plantation

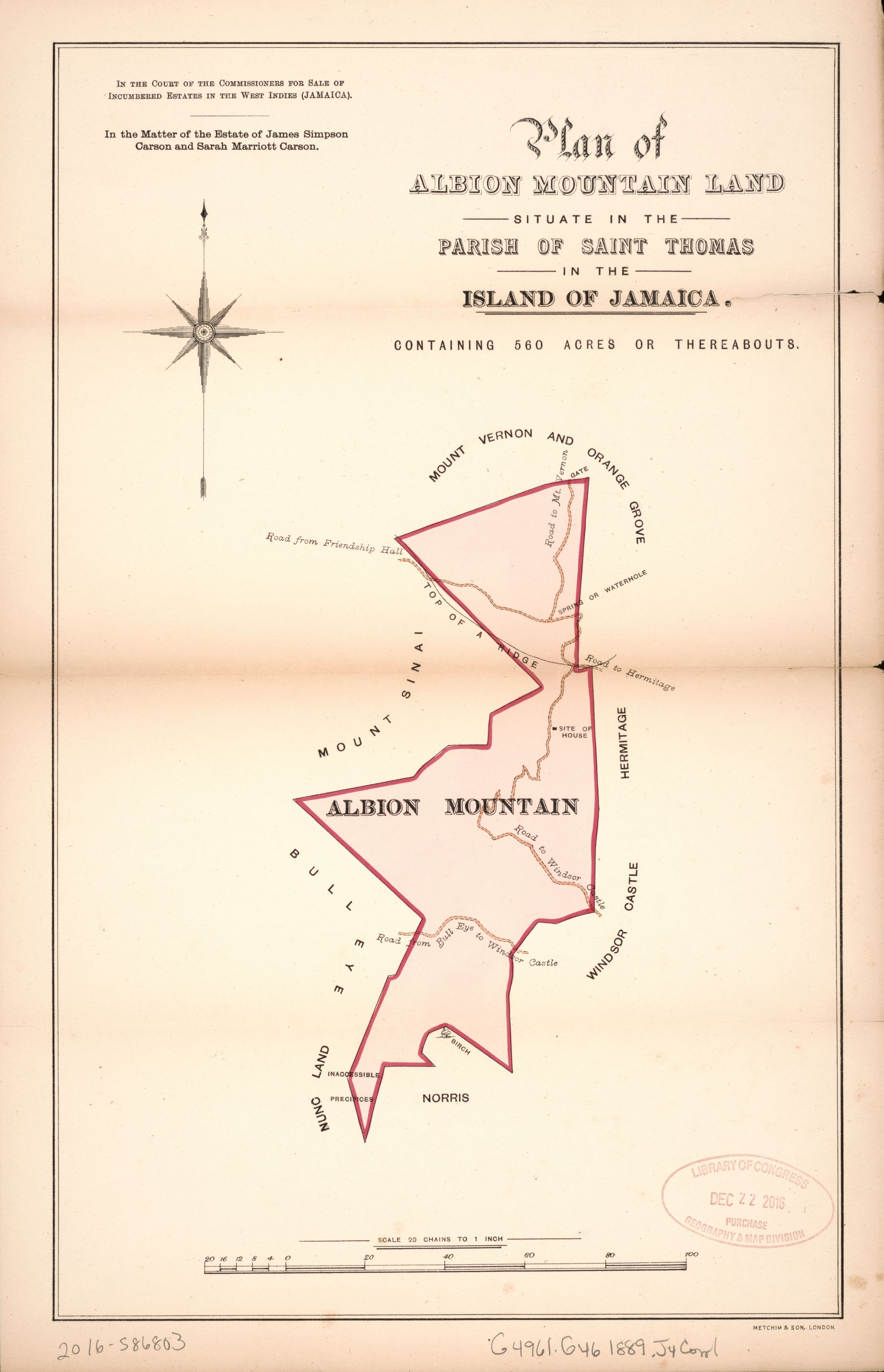
Map of the associated Albion Mountain.

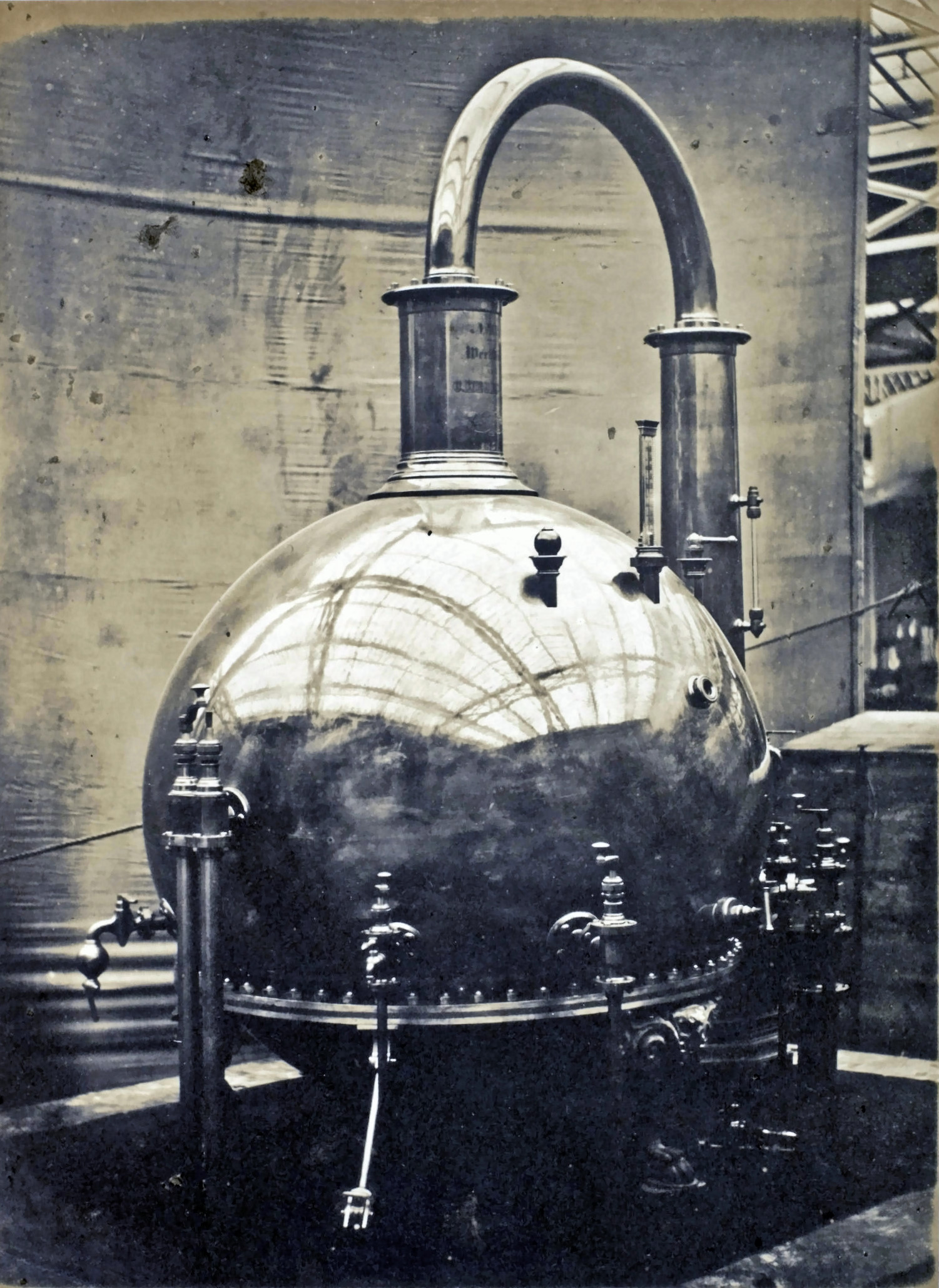
Vacuum sugar vessel at The Great Exhibition, 1851.

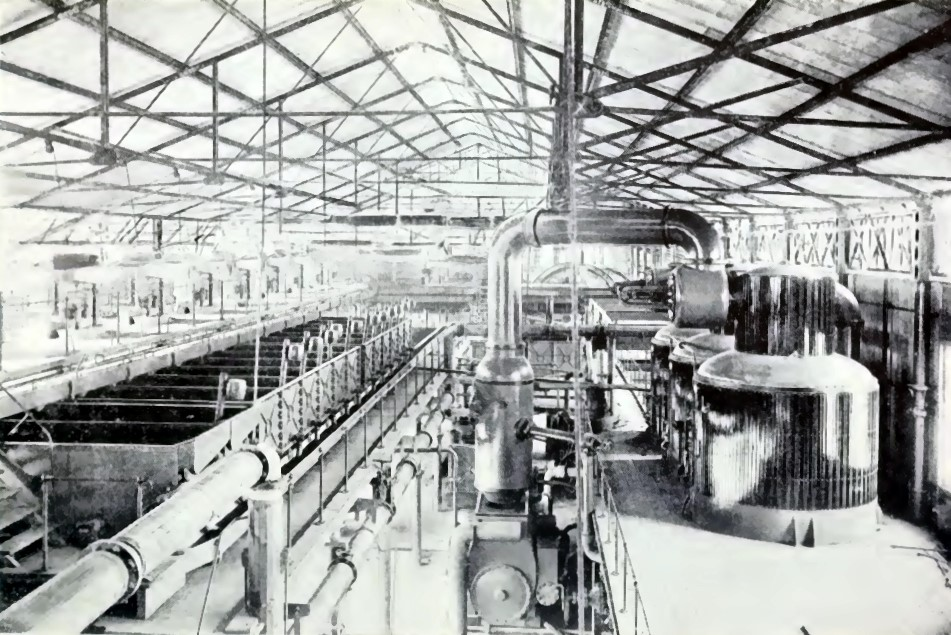
Sugar refining equipment at Albion c. 1890 showing the triple-effect evaporators on the right.

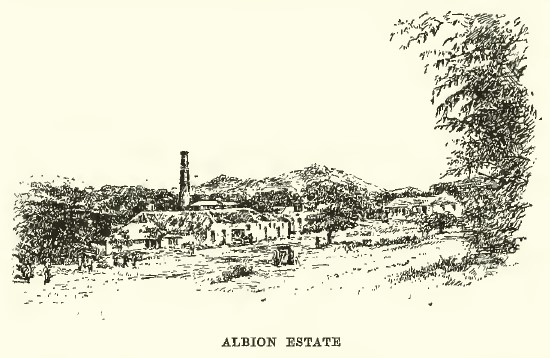
Albion, 1915.

Albion was a sugar plantation in Saint David Parish, Jamaica. Created during or before the 18th century, it had at least 451 slaves when slavery was abolished in most of the British Empire in 1833. By the end of the 19th-century it was the most productive plantation in Jamaica due to the advanced refining technology it used. By the early 20th century, however, its cane sugar could not compete with cheaper European beet sugar, and it produced its last sugar crop in 1928. It subsequently became a banana farm for the United Fruit Company.

Albion gave its name to Albion Cane, Albion Sugar and the settlement of Albion Estate.

== Location ==
Albion was about 16 miles east of Kingston in Saint David Parish, now Saint Thomas Parish, on the south coast of Jamaica. It was irrigated by the Yallahs River in the east and had its own port facilities at Cow Bay. The road from Kingston to Windward ran through the southern part of the plantation.

== History ==
Among the earliest owners of Albion plantation were John Nixon (died by 1774) who also owned Mullet Hall in Saint Thomas-in-the-East. Albion was then purchased by the merchant Robert Hibbert (1750-1835). After slavery was abolished in the British Empire by the Slavery Abolition Act 1833, Hibbert's executors received compensation in 1835 of £8,291 in respect of 451 enslaved persons at Albion.

In 1794 Albion was surveyed by Archibald Edgar, who recorded that it was of 1,492 acres with 294 in cane. It was producing 300 hogsheads of sugar and 182 puncheons of rum. At the time of emancipation in 1833 this had risen to 400 of sugar and 240 of rum following the enlargement of the plantation through the addition of Spring Garden plantation in the north and Cow Bay Pen in the south. When it was surveyed again by Edward McGeachy in 1842, it covered 4,074 acres but production had fallen to 182 of sugar and 106 of rum.

In 1820-21, James Hakewill prepared a view of Albion for Robert Hibbert senior that was not included in his portfolio of pictures published in 1825.

By 1877 when the plantation was surveyed by Thomas Harrison, it had over 500 acres in cane; and in 1880 output had reached 710 hogsheads of sugar and 480 puncheons of rum, making Albion the leading producer in Jamaica. This increase in output was mainly attributable to improved technology in the production process, with the addition of a steam mill to the existing water mill and the adoption of the vacuum pan evaporation method with centrifugal drying from the 1870s. Although John Gladstone had used this method from 1832 in British Guiana, only Albion was using it in Jamaica, resulting in the crystal sugar produced using the method coming to be known in Jamaica as Albion Sugar, along with its variants Brown Albion and White Albion. The type of sugarcane under cultivation on the plantation became known as Albion Cane.

By 1889 the plantation was owned by James Simpson Carson and Sarah Marriott Carson when it came up for sale at auction in London, by order of the Court of the Commissioners for Sale of Incumbered Estates in the West Indies, in a process that allowed creditors of indebted estates to override legal obstacles in order to force a sale of their security to repay mortgages and other charges over the estate. The auction particulars stated that it was of 4,335 acres and had produced on average, over the last seven years, 380 hogsheads of sugar and 270 puncheons of rum. Also for sale was Albion Mountain, a plot of about 560 acres one mile from the plantation.

Buildings included in the sale included:

Manager's House and Book-keeper's Quarters, a Mill House, Trash House, Boiling House, Curing House, Distillery, Smith's and Carpenter's Shops, Hospital for accommodation of 20 Patients, 21 Cottages for Coolies, and a Sugar Store.

James H. Stark described Albion in this way in his 1898 guide to Jamaica:

There is a moist freshness and a greenness in these large cane-fields that are sought for in vain elsewhere in the tropics. At frequent intervals irrigating streams, so necessary for cane culture, flow through the broad acres of growing cane. Beyond these immense green fields are the long lines of barracks or quarters, painted white, and flanking the clustered stone and brick buildings of the plantation.

By the 1890s, Albion was using the expensive but effective triple-effect evaporation method, as shown in a contemporary photograph; but by the early 20th-century, its cane sugar was unable to compete with the cheaper European beet sugar and the plantation produced its last crop of sugar in 1928. It was taken over by the United Fruit Company and planted with bananas and later subdivided into small plots for local farmers.

== Legacy ==
The plantation "great house", known locally as Albion Castle, was already in ruins when Frank Cundall wrote his Historic Jamaica in 1915. Its remains, an aqueduct, and a waterwheel survived as of 2013. In that year, a travel guide described the former slave house at Albion as being occupied by descendants of the estate's former slaves. The Albion name survives in the settlement of Albion Estate.

== See also ==
- List of plantations in Jamaica
- List of plantation great houses in Jamaica
