= Nigon =

Nigon is a surname. Notable people with the surname include:

- Claude Nigon (1928–1994), French fencer
- Gabriel Nigon (born 1956), Swiss fencer
- Victor Nigon (1920–2015), French biologist

== See also ==
- Nixon (surname)
