= Senator Nixon =

Senator Nixon may refer to:

== Members of the United States Senate ==
- George S. Nixon (1860–1912), U.S. Senator from Nevada from 1905 to 1912
- Richard Nixon (1913–1994), U.S. Senator from California from 1950 to 1953

== United States state senate members ==
- Drew Nixon (born 1959), Texas State Senate
- Jay Nixon (born 1956), Missouri State Senate
- Richard Nixon (Montana politician) (1901–1975), Montana State Senate
