= McGeachy =

McGeachy is a surname. Notable people with the surname include:

- Edward McGeachy, the Crown Surveyor for the county of Surrey in Jamaica
- Forster Alleyne McGeachy (1809–1887), British politician
- Iain David McGeachy, British singer-songwriter and guitarist
- Neill McGeachy (1942–2018), American basketball coach
