= Lewis & Clark: The Journey of the Corps of Discovery =

- Genre: Documentary
- Written by: Dayton Duncan
- Directed by: Ken Burns
- Starring: Sam Waterston; Adam Arkin; Murphy Guyer
- Narrated by: Hal Holbrook
- Country of origin: United States
- Original language: English
- No. of episodes: 2

Production
- Producers: Dayton Duncan; Ken Burns
- Cinematography: Buddy Squires; Ken Burns; Allen Moore
- Editors: Paul Barnes; Erik Ewers
- Running time: 3.5 hours
- Production companies: Florentine Films; WETA-TV

Original release
- Network: PBS
- Release: November 4 – November 5, 1997

Lewis & Clark: The Journey of the Corps of Discovery is a 1997 television documentary miniseries about the Lewis and Clark Expedition directed and co-produced by Ken Burns. It is produced by Burns' Florentine Films for Washington, DC PBS station WETA-TV, first aired on PBS on November 4 and 5, 1997.

The first part of the film covers the expedition up to the headwaters of the Missouri River. The second part of the film covers the meeting with the Shoshone, the treacherous crossing of the mountains, the downstream rush to reach the Pacific Ocean, and the ambitious explorations of the return trip.

The film, as with most of Burns' individual biography documentaries, is part of his American Lives film project, and is so credited in the copyright.

== Summary ==
The following summary appeared in the 2001 PBS DVD Gold release of the film:

Sent by President Thomas Jefferson to find the fabled Northwest Passage, Meriwether Lewis and William Clark led the most important expedition in American history—a voyage of danger and discovery from St. Louis to the headwaters of the Missouri River, over the Continental Divide to the Pacific. It was the United States' first exploration of the West and one of the nation's most enduring adventures.

This extraordinary film tells the remarkable story of the entire Corps of Discovery—not just the two famous Captains, but the young army men, French-Canadian boatmen, Clark's African-American slave, and the Shoshone woman named Sacagawea, who brought along her infant son. Journey with them all, across a breath-taking landscape in an unforgettable experience that explores both the history—and promise—of America.

== Cast ==
Cast information from IMDb.

- Hal Holbrook - Narrator

The voice-over cast reading quotes from the people involved included:

- Sam Waterston - Thomas Jefferson (Waterson also played Jefferson in Burns' Thomas Jefferson film)
- Adam Arkin - Meriwether Lewis
- Murphy Guyer - William Clark
- Matthew Broderick - John Ordway
- Kevin Conway - Patrick Gass
- Gene Jones - Joseph Whitehouse
- Tantoo Cardinal - Indian Woman Voice
- Tim Clark, Ken Little Hawk, Daniel von Bargen, John Trudell - voices.

Appearing as themselves:

- Dayton Duncan - writer and co-producer of this film, among others
- Stephen E. Ambrose - historian who wrote Undaunted Courage about Lewis and the expedition
- John Logan Allen - geographer
- William Least Heat-Moon - writer
- Erica Funkhouser - writer
- James P. Ronda - historian
- Gerard Baker - member of the Mandan-Hidatsa, tribes who befriended the expedition
- Mylie Lawyer - descendant of Nez Perce Chief Twisted Hair, who befriended the expedition

== Production ==
Funding for the film was provided by General Motors, the Pew Charitable Trusts, the Arthur Vining Davis Foundations, Corporation for Public Broadcasting, PBS viewers, the William T. Kemper Foundation, the William and Flora Hewlett Foundation and by the Montana Department of Commerce, whose voice-over in the original introduction draws a famous quote from a journal entry by Meriwether Lewis: "Montana, where 'scenes of visionary enchantment' can still be discovered".

Longtime Burns collaborator Geoffrey C. Ward served as Senior Creative Consultant.

Program advisors included Allen, Ambrose, Heat-Moon and Ronda. Program advisors not appearing on camera included Gary E. Moulton, Frank Muhly and Lynn Novick.

== "Help along the way" preview tour ==
Ken Burns recalls in his Charlie Rose interview November 3, 1997 that primary film underwriter General Motors wanted to know how he wanted to celebrate their 10th anniversary of filmmaking together. He suggested, in keeping with the "help along the way" spirit of the expedition, a preview tour honoring the people of the cities along the trail who helped make the film possible.

As part of these events, their segment of the completed film was previewed prior to its airing on PBS. When the preview tour reached Great Falls that October, nearby resident and film contributor Stephen E. Ambrose joined Burns and Duncan and many of the reenactors of the month-long portage of the five falls of the Missouri River as the completed film segment about the portage was previewed.

== Video releases ==
- VHS - December 9, 1997.
- DVD - 2001 (PBS DVD Gold Edition, ISBN 0-7806-3235-4). This dual-sided DVD includes Part 1 of the film plus bonus Charlie Rose interviews with Stephen E. Ambrose from March 1996 and Ken Burns & Dayton Duncan from November 3, 1997 on Side A, and Part 2 of the film plus three bonus featurettes ("The Making of Lewis & Clark", "Ken Burns: Making History", and "A Conversation with Ken Burns") on Side B.

== Other media ==
- A hardcover companion book, subtitled An Illustrated History, was published at the time of the film's debut. A paperback edition was released August 31, 1999. The book was written by Dayton Duncan, however, cover images available on retail sites also credit film co-producer Ken Burns as co-author.
- The soundtrack of the recordings used in the film was released on RCA at the time of the film's debut.
