= Nickson =

Nickson is an English surname. Notable people with the surname include:

- Arthur Nickson (1902–1974), British writer of western fiction
- Arthur Nickson (musician) (1876–1964), Australian musician
- Chantelle Nickson-Clark, American politician
- David Nickson, Baron Nickson (born 1929), British businessman
- Elizabeth Nickson, Canadian journalist
- George Nickson (1864–1924), Anglican bishop
- Graham Nickson (1946–2025), British artist
- Hilda Nickson aka Hilda Pressley (1912–1977), British writer of romance novels
- J. J. Nickson (1915–1985), American physician
- Julia Nickson (born 1958), Singaporean-born American actress
- Nick Nickson (born 1953), American sportscaster
- Susan Nickson (born 1982), English television screenwriter

== See also ==
- Nixon (disambiguation)
