= Richard Nixon (disambiguation) =

Richard Nixon (1913–1994) was the 37th president of the United States from 1969 to 1974.

Richard Nixon may also refer to:

- Richard Nixon (Montana politician) (1901–1975), American politician, Montana State Senator
- Richard Nixon (footballer) (1965–1992), Australian rules footballer
