= This Vast Land =

2003 young-adult historical novel by Stephen Ambrose

- First edition
- Author: Stephen Ambrose
- Language: English
- Genre: Historical
- Publication date: 2003
- Publication place: United States

This Vast Land is an historical novel for the young-adult public, written by American historian and author Stephen Ambrose. Published in 2003 by Simon & Schuster Children's Publishing, it a fictionalized account in the form of a diary written by George Shannon, the youngest member of the Lewis and Clark Expedition. The novel details the expedition from Shannon's viewpoint; although beginning the expedition as the most inexperienced member, he slowly matures into one of the expedition's most important figures.

== Critical reception ==
According to Kirkus Reviews: "By segmenting the epic voyage into a series of fictitious journal entries, Ambrose loses the grand sweep of events, and no introduction or afterword provides a context."
