= Stephen E. Ambrose =

American historian and writer (1936–2002)

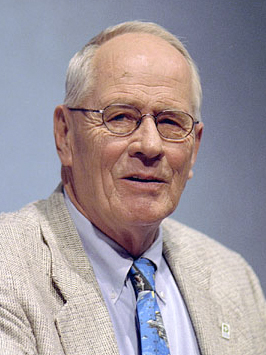
- Ambrose in August 2001
- Born: Stephen Edward Ambrose; January 10, 1936; Lovington, Illinois, U.S.
- Died: October 13, 2002 (aged 66); Bay St. Louis, Mississippi, U.S.
- Education: University of Wisconsin–Madison (BA, PhD); Louisiana State University (MA)
- Occupations: Historian; author
- Spouses: Judith Dorlester (m. 1957; died 1965) Moira Buckley (m. 1967)
- Children: 5, including Hugh Ambrose

Stephen Edward Ambrose (January 10, 1936 – October 13, 2002) was an American historian and author whose work focused particularly on World War II, the American West, and the lives of U.S. presidents Dwight D. Eisenhower and Richard Nixon. He taught history from 1960 until his retirement in 1995 and was a member of the University of New Orleans faculty from 1971, becoming Boyd Professor of History in 1989. He also founded the university's Eisenhower Center and co-founded the National D-Day Museum, later designated the National World War II Museum.

Ambrose's books included The Supreme Commander and a two-volume biography of Eisenhower, a three-volume biography of Nixon, Band of Brothers (1992), D-Day (1994), Undaunted Courage (1996), Citizen Soldiers (1997), Nothing Like It in the World (2000), and The Wild Blue (2001). D-Day became his first bestseller, while Citizen Soldiers and Undaunted Courage also appeared on The New York Times best-seller lists. He received the National Humanities Medal and the Samuel Eliot Morison Prize in 1998, among other awards.

Ambrose's work was also the subject of controversies over plagiarism and historical accuracy. Several of his books were found to contain plagiarized passages, with a Forbes investigation tracing the pattern back to his doctoral dissertation. After his death, presidential library records contradicted his claims of having conducted hundreds of hours of interviews with Eisenhower, showing that the two had met only three times for fewer than five hours in total; this led several historians to conclude that Ambrose had fabricated interviews and exaggerated his access.

== Early life and education ==
Ambrose was born on January 10, 1936, in Lovington, Illinois, to Rosepha Trippe Ambrose and Stephen Hedges Ambrose. His father was a physician who served in the U.S. Navy during World War II. Ambrose was raised in Whitewater, Wisconsin, where he graduated from Whitewater High School. His family also owned a farm in Lovington, Illinois, and vacation property in Marinette County, Wisconsin.

He attended college at the University of Wisconsin–Madison, where he was a member of Chi Psi fraternity and played on the University of Wisconsin football team for three years. Ambrose planned to major in pre-medicine, but changed his major to history after hearing the first lecture in a U.S. history class entitled Representative Americans in his sophomore year. The course was taught by William B. Hesseltine, whom Ambrose credits with fundamentally shaping his writing and igniting his interest in history.

While at Wisconsin, Ambrose was a member of the Navy and Army ROTC. He graduated with a B.A. in 1957. Ambrose received a master's degree in history from Louisiana State University in 1958, studying under T. Harry Williams. Ambrose then went on to earn a Ph.D. from the University of Wisconsin–Madison in 1963, under Hesseltine.

== Career ==
=== Academic positions ===
Ambrose was a history professor from 1960 until his retirement in 1995. From 1971 onward, he was a member of the University of New Orleans faculty, where he was named the Boyd Professor of History in 1989, an honor given only to faculty who attain "national or international distinction for outstanding teaching, research, or other creative achievement". During the 1969–70 academic year, he was the Ernest J. King Professor of Maritime History at the Naval War College. While teaching at Kansas State University as the Dwight D. Eisenhower Professor of War and Peace during the 1970–1971 academic year, Ambrose participated in the heckling of Richard Nixon during a speech the president gave on the KSU campus. Given pressure from the KSU administration and having job offers elsewhere, upon finishing out the year Ambrose offered to leave and the offer was accepted.

His opposition to the Vietnam War stood in contrast to his research on "presidents and the military at a time when such topics were increasingly regarded by his colleagues as old fashioned and conservative." Ambrose also taught at Louisiana State University (assistant professor of history; 1960–1964) and Johns Hopkins University (associate professor of history; 1964–1969). He held visiting posts at Rutgers University, the University of California, Berkeley, and a number of European schools, including University College Dublin, where he taught as the Mary Ball Washington Professor of American History.

He founded the Eisenhower Center at the University of New Orleans in 1989, stating, "The mission of the Eisenhower Center is the study of the causes, conduct, and consequences of American national security policy and the use of force as an instrument of policy in the twentieth century." He served as its director until 1994. The center's first efforts, which Ambrose initiated, involved the collection of oral histories from World War II veterans about their experiences, particularly any participation in D-Day. By the time of publication of Ambrose's D-Day, June 6, 1944: The Climactic Battle of World War II, in 1994, the center had collected more than 1,200 oral histories. Ambrose donated $150,000 to the Center in 1998 to foster additional efforts to collect oral histories from World War II veterans.

=== Writings ===
Ambrose's earliest works concerned the American Civil War. He wrote biographies of the generals Emory Upton and Henry Halleck, the first of which was based on his dissertation.

Early in his career, Ambrose was mentored by World War II historian Forrest Pogue. In 1964, Ambrose took a position at Johns Hopkins as the Associate Editor of the Eisenhower Papers, a project aimed at organizing, cataloging and publishing Eisenhower's principal papers. From this work and discussions with Eisenhower emerged an article critical of Cornelius Ryan's The Last Battle, which had depicted Eisenhower as politically naîve, when at the end of World War II he allowed Soviet forces to take Berlin, thus shaping the Cold War that followed. Ambrose expanded this into a book, Eisenhower and Berlin, 1945: The Decision to Halt at the Elbe (1967). Ambrose was aided in the book's writing by comments and notes provided by Eisenhower, who read a draft of the book.

In 1964, Ambrose was commissioned to write the official biography of the former president and five-star general Dwight D. Eisenhower. This resulted in a book on Eisenhower's war years, The Supreme Commander (1970), and a two-volume full biography (published in 1983 and 1984), which are considered "the standard" on the subject. Regarding the first volume, Gordon Harrison, writing for The New York Times, proclaimed, "It is Mr. Ambrose's special triumph that he has been able to fight through the memoranda, the directives, plans, reports, and official self-serving pieties of the World War II establishment to uncover the idiosyncratic people at its center."

Ambrose's claims of an extraordinarily close relationship with Eisenhower, including "hundreds and hundreds of hours" of interviews, were contradicted after his death by presidential library records showing the pair only met three times for fewer than five hours total. This has led many historians to conclude that Ambrose had fabricated interviews and exaggerated his access. Ambrose also wrote a three-volume biography of Richard Nixon. Although Ambrose was a strong critic of Nixon, the biography was considered fair and just regarding Nixon's presidency.

A visit to a reunion of Easy Company veterans in 1988 prompted Ambrose to collect their stories, turning them into Band of Brothers, E Company, 506th Regiment, 101st Airborne: From Normandy to Hitler's Eagle's Nest (1992). D-Day (1994), built upon additional oral histories, presented the battle from the view points of individual soldiers and became his first best seller. A reviewer for the Journal of Military History commended D-Day as the "most comprehensive discussion" of the sea, air, and land operations that coalesced on that day. Christopher Lehmann-Haupt, writing for The New York Times, proclaimed that "Reading this history, you can understand why for so many of its participants, despite all the death surrounding them, life revealed itself in that moment at that place." Band of Brothers also received criticism for its disputed claim that Easy Company was the first Allied unit to reach Berchtesgaden and Kehlsteinhaus, a distinction also claimed by elements of the 3rd Infantry Division and the French 2nd Armored Division.

Ambrose's Citizen Soldiers, which describes battles fought in northwest Europe from D-Day through the end of the war in Europe, utilized, again, extensive oral histories. Citizen Soldiers became a best seller, appearing on the New York Times best sellers lists for both hardcover and paperback editions in the same week. During the same week, in September 1998, D-Day and Undaunted Courage, Ambrose's 1996 book on Meriwether Lewis and the Corps of Discovery, appeared on the best seller list, also. He also wrote The Victors (1998), a distillation of material from other books detailing Eisenhower's wartime experiences and connections to the common soldier, and The Wild Blue, that looks at World War II aviation largely through the experiences of George McGovern, who commanded a B-24 crew that flew numerous missions over Germany. His other major works include Undaunted Courage about the Lewis and Clark Expedition and Nothing Like It in the World about the construction of the Pacific Railroad. Nothing Like It in the World was criticized by railroad historians and journal reviewers for containing more than sixty significant errors, misstatements, and fabricated quotes. His final book, This Vast Land, a historical novel about the Lewis & Clark expedition written for young readers, was published posthumously in 2003.

Ambrose's most popular single work was Undaunted Courage: Meriwether Lewis, Thomas Jefferson, and the Opening of the American West (1996), which stayed on the New York Times best seller list for a combined, hardcover and paperback, 126 weeks. Ambrose consolidated research on the Corps of Discovery's expedition conducted in the previous thirty years and "synthesized it skillfully to enrich our understanding and appreciation of this grand epic", according to Alvin M. Josephy, Jr., who reviewed the book for The New York Times. Ken Burns, who produced and directed a PBS documentary on Lewis & Clark declared that Ambrose "takes one of the great, but also one of the most superficially considered, stories in American history and breathes fresh life into it."

In addition to 27 self-authored books, Ambrose co-authored, edited, and contributed to many more, and was a frequent contributor to magazines such as American Heritage. He, also, reviewed the works of other historians in the Journal of Southern History, Military Affairs, American Historical Review, The Journal of American History, and Foreign Affairs. As well, he served as a contributing editor to MHQ: The Quarterly Journal of Military History.

=== Allegations of plagiarism ===
In 2002, several instances of plagiarism were discovered in his books. In 2010, after his death, Ambrose was found to have fabricated interviews and events in his biographies of Eisenhower. Several of Ambrose's books—The Wild Blue, Undaunted Courage, Citizen Soldiers, and others—contained plagiarized passages, a pattern that a Forbes investigation traced back to his doctoral dissertation.

=== Television, film, and other activities ===
Ambrose served as historical consultant for the movie Saving Private Ryan. Tom Hanks, who starred in the movie, said he "pored over D-Day" and Band of Brothers in researching his role. Hanks also credited Ambrose's books with providing extensive detail, particularly regarding D-Day landings.

The HBO mini-series, Band of Brothers (2001), for which he was an executive producer, helped sustain the fresh interest in World War II that had been stimulated by the 50th anniversary of D-Day in 1994 and the 60th anniversary in 2004. Ambrose served as executive producer for Price for Peace, a documentary concerning the war in the Pacific theater during World War II, and for Moments of Truth, a TV documentary containing interviews with World War II veterans.

In addition, Ambrose served as a commentator for Lewis & Clark: The Journey of the Corps of Discovery, a documentary by Ken Burns. He provided commentary in 20 made-for-TV documentaries, covering diverse topics, such as World War II, Lewis & Clark, and America's prominence in the 20th century. He also appeared as a guest on numerous TV programs or stations, including The Charlie Rose Show, C-SPAN programming, CNN programming, NBC's Today Show, CNBC's Hardball, and various programming on The History Channel and the National Geographic Channel. Ambrose's association with National Geographic stemmed, in part, from his designation as an Explorer-in-Residence by the Society.

In addition to his academic work and publishing, Ambrose operated a historical tour business, acting as a tour guide to European locales of World War II. Also, he served on the board of directors for American Rivers and was a member of the Lewis and Clark Bicentennial Council.

=== National World War II Museum ===
Ambrose's work for the Eisenhower Center, specifically his work with D-Day veterans, inspired him to co-found the National D-Day Museum in New Orleans with another historian and UNO professor Gordon H. "Nick" Mueller. Ambrose initiated fundraising by donating $500,000. "He dreamt of a museum that reflected his deep regard for our nation's citizen soldiers, the workers on the Home Front and the sacrifices and hardships they endured to achieve victory." He secured large contributions from the federal government, state of Louisiana, Tom Hanks, Steven Spielberg, and many smaller donations from former students, who answered a plea made by Ambrose in the New Orleans Times-Picayune. In 2003, Congress designated the museum as "America's National World War II Museum," acknowledging an expanded scope and mission for the museum. "The Stephen E. Ambrose Memorial Fund continues to support the development of the museum's Center for Study of the American Spirit, its educational programs and oral history and publication initiatives."

=== Awards ===
In 1997, Ambrose received the St. Louis Literary Award from the Saint Louis University Library Associates. In 1998, he received the National Humanities Medal. In 1998, he was awarded the Samuel Eliot Morison Prize for lifetime achievement given by the Society for Military History. In 1998, he received the Golden Plate Award of the American Academy of Achievement.

In 2000, Ambrose received the Department of Defense Medal for Distinguished Public Service, the highest honorary award the Department of Defense offers to civilians. Ambrose won an Emmy as one of the producers for the mini-series Band of Brothers. He also received the George Marshall Award, the Abraham Lincoln Literary Award, the Bob Hope Award from the Congressional Medal of Honor Society, and the Will Rogers Memorial Award.

== Personal life, and death ==
External videos
- Memorial Service for Ambrose at the National D-Day Museum, October 19, 2002, C-SPAN

He married his first wife, Judith Dorlester, in 1957, and they had two children, Stephenie and Barry. Judith died in 1965, when Ambrose was 29. Ambrose married his second wife, Moira Buckley (1939–2009), in 1967 and adopted her three children, Andrew, Grace, and Hugh. Moira was an active assistant in his writing and academic projects. After retiring, he maintained homes in Helena, Montana, and Bay St. Louis, Mississippi. A longtime smoker, he was diagnosed with lung cancer in April 2002. His health deteriorated rapidly, and seven months after the diagnosis, he died at the age of 66.

== Legacy ==
Ambrose donated $500,000, half the amount needed, to the University of Wisconsin, to endow a chair in the name of William B. Hesseltine, Ambrose's mentor. The chair's position would focus on the teaching of American military history. When the chair became fully endowed, after Ambrose's death, it was renamed the Ambrose-Hesseltine Chair.

The Ambrose Professor of History title was established at the University of New Orleans after his death. The position is reserved for a military historian.

Each year the Rutgers University Living History Society awards the Stephen E. Ambrose Oral History Award to "an author or artist who has made significant use of oral history." Past winners include Tom Brokaw, Steven Spielberg, Studs Terkel, Michael Beschloss, and Ken Burns.

George McGovern, the primary focus of Ambrose's Wild Blue said, "He probably reached more readers than any other historian in our national history."

== Works ==
=== Sole author ===
- Halleck: Lincoln's Chief of Staff, Baton Rouge, Louisiana State University Press (1962)
- Upton and the Army, Louisiana State University Press (1964)
- Duty, Honor, Country: A History of West Point, Baltimore: Johns Hopkins University Press (1966)
- Eisenhower and Berlin, 1945: The Decision to Halt at the Elbe. New York: W.W. Norton. 1967. OCLC 203781.
- The Supreme Commander: the War Years of General Dwight D. Eisenhower, New York: Doubleday (1970)
- Crazy Horse and Custer: The Parallel Lives of Two American Warriors, New York: Doubleday (1975) ISBN 0-385-09666-6
- Ike's Spies: Eisenhower and the Espionage Establishment, New York: Doubleday (1981) ISBN 0-385-14493-8
- Eisenhower Volume 1: Soldier, General of the Army, President-Elect, 1890–1952, New York: Simon & Schuster (1983) ISBN 0-671-44069-1
- Eisenhower Volume 2: The President, 1952–1969, New York: Simon & Schuster (1984) ISBN 0-671-49901-7
- Pegasus Bridge: June 6, 1944, New York: Simon & Schuster (1985) ISBN 0-671-52374-0
- Nixon: The Education of a Politician, 1913–1962, New York: Simon & Schuster (1987) ISBN 0-671-52836-X
- Eisenhower: Soldier and President, New York: Simon & Schuster (1990) ISBN 0-671-70107-X (a one-volume condensation of the 1983–84 two-volume Eisenhower biography)
- Nixon: The Triumph of a Politician, 1962–1972, New York: Simon & Schuster (1990) ISBN 0-671-52837-8
- Nixon: Ruin and Recovery, 1973-1990, New York: Simon & Schuster (1991) ISBN 0-671-69188-0
- Band of Brothers, E Company, 506th Regiment, 101st Airborne: From Normandy to Hitler's Eagle's Nest (1992) ISBN 0-671-76922-7
- D-Day, June 6, 1944: The Climactic Battle of World War II, New York, Simon & Schuster (1994) ISBN 0-671-88403-4
- Undaunted Courage: Meriwether Lewis, Thomas Jefferson, and the Opening of the American West, New York: Simon & Schuster (1996) ISBN 0-684-81107-3
- Citizen Soldiers: The U.S. Army from the Normandy Beaches to the Bulge to the Surrender of Germany, June 7, 1944 – May 7, 1945, New York: Simon & Schuster (1997) ISBN 0-684-81525-7
- Americans at War, Jackson: University Press of Mississippi (1997) ISBN 1-57806-026-5
- The Victors: Eisenhower and his Boys – The Men of World War II, New York: Simon & Schuster (1998) ISBN 0-684-85628-X
- Comrades: Brothers, Fathers, Heroes, Sons, Pals, New York: Simon & Schuster (1999) ISBN 0-684-86718-4
- Nothing Like It in the World: The Men who Built the Transcontinental Railroad, 1863-1869, New York: Simon & Schuster (2000) ISBN 0-684-84609-8
- The Wild Blue: The Men and Boys who Flew the B-24s over Germany, New York: Simon & Schuster (2001) ISBN 0-7432-0339-9
- The Good Fight: How World War II Was Won, Atheneum Books for Young Readers (2001) ISBN 0-689-84361-5
- To America: Personal Reflections of an Historian, New York: Simon & Schuster (2002) ISBN 0-7432-0275-9
- This Vast Land, New York: Simon & Schuster, (2003) ISBN 0-689-86448-5

=== With others ===
- with Richard H. Immerman, Milton S. Eisenhower, Educational Statesman, Baltimore, MD: Johns Hopkins University Press (1983) ISBN 0-8018-2988-7
- with Douglas Brinkley, Rise to Globalism: American Foreign Policy since 1938, New York: Penguin Books (1997) ISBN 0-14-026831-6
- with Sam Abell, Lewis and Clark: Voyage of Discovery, Washington DC: National Geographic Society, (1998, 2002) ISBN 0-7922-7084-3
- with Douglas Brinkley, Witness to America (1999) ISBN 978-0-06-271611-8; 2010: ISBN 0-06-199028-0
- with Douglas Brinkley, The Mississippi and the Making of a Nation: From the Louisiana Purchase to Today (2002), ISBN 0-7922-6913-6

=== Edited works ===
- Institutions in Modern America: Innovation in Structure and Process, Baltimore, MD: Johns Hopkins University Press (1967)
- with James A. Barber, The Military and American Society: Essays and Readings, New York, NY: The Free Press (1972) ISBN 0-375-50910-0
- with Gunter Bischoff, Eisenhower and the German POWs: Facts Against Falsehood, Baton Rouge, LA: Louisiana State University Press (1992) ISBN 0-8071-1758-7
- with Gunter Bischoff, Eisenhower: A Centenary Assessment, Baton Rouge, LA: Louisiana State University Press (1995) ISBN 0-8071-1942-3
- American Heritage New History of World War II (original text by C.L. Sulzberger), New York, NY: Viking Press (1997) ISBN 0-670-87474-4
