= The Wild Blue =

2001 book by Stephen Ambrose

The Wild Blue: The Men and Boys who Flew the B-24s over Germany
- McGovern top row, 2nd from left, Bill Rounds, top row, 1st on left
- Author: Stephen E. Ambrose
- Cover artist: Design by Lisa Chovnik
- Language: English
- Subject: History of a WWII B-24, George McGovern pilot
- Genre: History
- Publisher: Simon & Schuster
- Publication date: 2001
- Publication place: United States
- Media type: Paperback, Hardback
- Pages: 304 in Paperback
- ISBN: 978-0-7434-5062-1
- OCLC: 59450527

The Wild Blue: The Men and Boys who Flew the B-24s over Germany, by historian and best selling author Stephen Ambrose, is a New York Times best selling non-fiction book published in 2001. It details the lives and World War II experiences of pilots, bombardiers, navigators, radio operators and gunners flying B-24 bombers of the U.S. Army Air Force against Nazi Germany. The book entails a recounting of George McGovern's exceptional career as a chief pilot of a B-24 with the 455th Bomb Group in Italy, encompassing 35 bombing missions. With the odds of surviving all 35 missions as low as 50%, the bomber crews flew during dangerous daylight hours, in risky tight flying formations, and despite bad weather and assaults of heavy, deadly, flak from ground-based German anti-aircraft guns.

== Author background ==
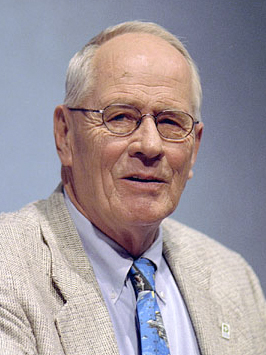
Ambrose in 2001, year of publication

Ambrose was a history professor for 35 years from 1960-1995. After 1971, he taught at New Orleans University where he was named the Boyd Professor of History in 1989. Despite his academic credentials, his image was tarnished by accusations of plagiarism near the end of his career, particularly after his publication of The Wild Blue, his last volume. Revealing the sources of plagiarism in The Wild Blue, Fred Barnes reported in The Weekly Standard that Ambrose had taken passages from Wings of Morning: The Story of the Last American Bomber Shot Down over Germany in World War II, by Thomas Childers, a history professor at the University of Pennsylvania. Ambrose had footnoted sources, but had not enclosed in quotation marks numerous passages from Childers's book. The use of italics to indicate some of the text was copied from other writer's works, however, might have been sufficient to avoid charges of plagiarism at the time, and in subsequent editions Ambrose addressed the issue. A more sensitive researcher might have even forgiven Ambrose's scholarly oversights as he was not long from dying of cancer during his final drafts of The Wild Blue.

Perhaps best known of Ambrose's work's is a lengthy history of Dwight Eisenhower The Supreme Commander (1970) and a two-volume full biography (published in 1983 and 1984), which are considered "the standard" on the subject. His work on the Eisenhower volumes influenced the tone of admiration and reverence he took towards veterans in general, and particularly his characters in The Wild Blue. Focusing on the real attraction of The Wild Blue, Kennedy White House aide Arthur Schlesinger Jr. wrote that Dr. Ambrose "combined high standards of scholarship with the capacity to make history come alive for a lay audience."

Ambrose wrote an extensive history of Richard Nixon, though he was not a supporter of his presidency or presidential candidacy in 1972. While teaching at Kansas State University as the Dwight D. Eisenhower Professor of War and Peace during the 1970–1971 academic year, Ambrose participated in heckling Nixon during a speech the president gave on the KSU campus. His opposition to the Vietnam War stood in contrast to his research on "presidents and the military at a time when such topics were increasingly regarded by his colleagues as old fashioned and conservative." Ambrose may have secretly jumped at the opportunity to depict McGovern in Wild Blue as a strong, patriotic American in contrast to the 1972 Nixon re-election campaign that may have subtly portrayed the Dakota Senator, who campaigned for a quicker end to the bombing in Viet Nam, as a supporter of draft dodging, amnesty seeking, anti-American hippies. According to political scholar Theodore White, during the mid-term elections of November 1970, presidential front runner Edmund Muskie had felt the need to respond to statements by President Richard Nixon and Vice President Spiro Agnew impugning the patriotism of Democrats. In the divisive congressional era of the early 70's, McGovern's Hatfield-McGovern Amendment to bring a quicker end to the war had already been defeated in Congress by the time he was nominated before a divided party as the Democratic candidate for President against the incumbent Richard Nixon in 1972.

== Content ==
=== Description of the B-24 ===
The story is important as the B-24 was the most widely used and manufactured bomber in WWII, yet few novels have fully detailed the challenges faced by their Bomber crews who flew them in raids over Germany. At approximately 18,500 units produced – including 8,685 manufactured by Ford Motor Company – the B-24 holds records as the world's most produced bomber, heavy bomber, multi-engine aircraft, and American military aircraft in history. According to one source, the crews experienced an alarming casualty rate of slightly over fifty percent due to the dangers of daylight bombing, training flights, and other factors. For the better known Memphis Belle, a B-17 bomber, in her first three months of missions flown from Bassingbourn, England, her 8th Air Force Group experienced an even more astonishing casualty rate of 80%. Like the other planes in its bomb group, McGovern's B-24 bomber was a four engine craft that generally housed a crew of 9-10. Adding to the regular danger involved in takeoffs and landings of such a heavy, bomb-laden craft, "runways were often dangerous, patchwork affairs, the former farmland covered with steel matting."

==== Steering and controls ====
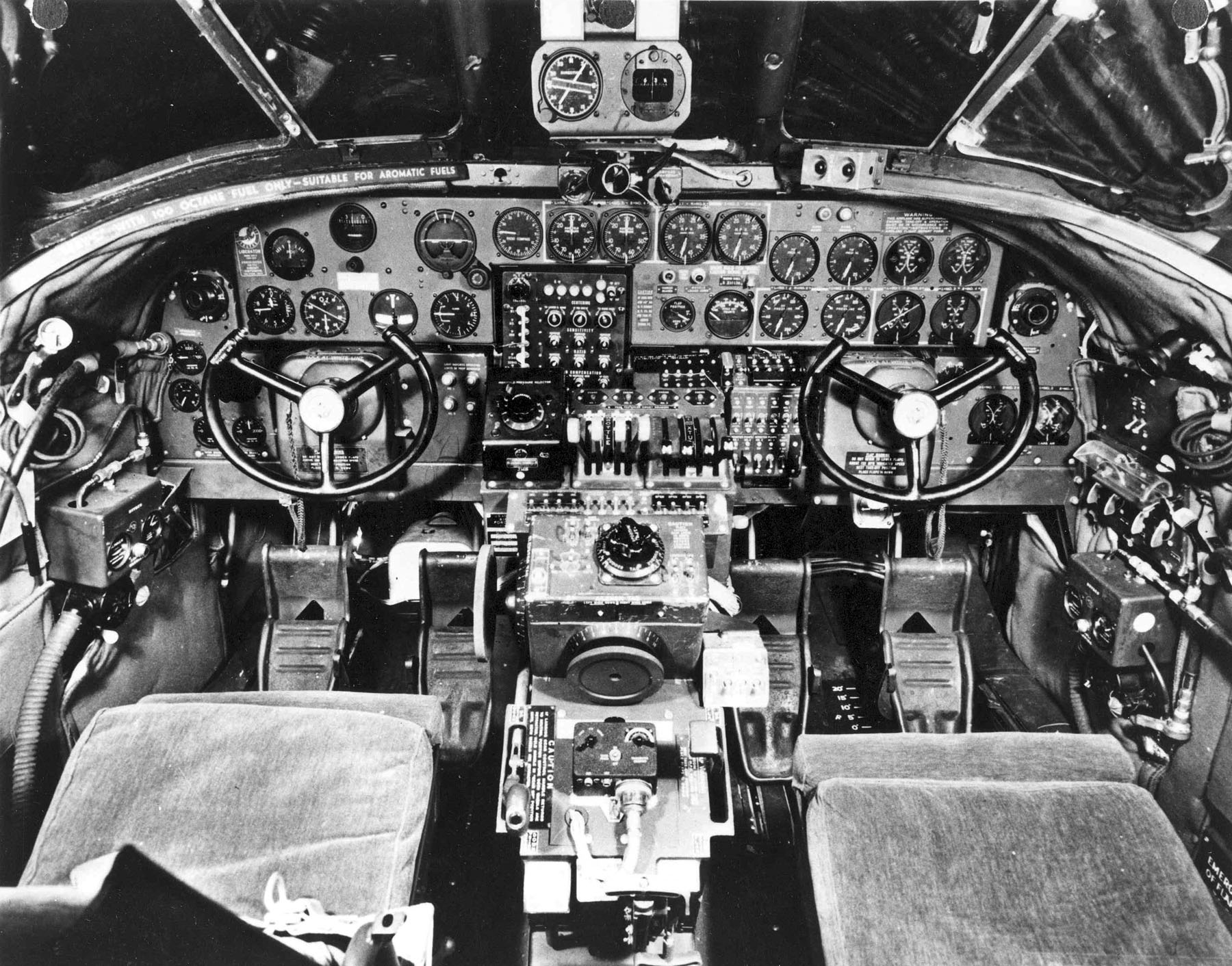
B‑24 cockpit controls (behind yokes), yokes, rudders and brakes (below yokes)

Faced with lengthy flights, the pilots sometimes struggled with a wheel that had no power steering and were forced to adjust and interpret control panels that could be complex, and that sprawled across the front console in a confusing array of dials and meters. As noted by Ambrose, and shown at right, the bomber had "twenty-seven gauges on the panel, twelve levers for the throttle, turbocharger, and fuel mixture, four on the pilot's side on his right, four on the co-pilot's side on his left". "There were over a dozen switches, plus brake pedals, rudders (shown below the yokes) and more". The wheel, also shown at right, or "yoke" as it was called, was as big as that on a large truck. Ambrose wrote "The B-24 was a man's airplane. It could be sternly unforgiving. It always required and sometimes demanded almost super-human strength to fly. On a long mission it could wear out even the strongest pilot". As Ambrose noted, the physical strength required to control the yoke was compounded by the physical fatigue caused by long bombing runs. Even in training, one pilot wrote "Every third day we go twenty hours straight and the two days in between are seventeen hours long...we fly every day and sometimes we don't get home 'til 3 a.m. but we still get up and go again. I believe combat will be a rest after this." For actual round trip bombing runs to Germany, as many as ten hours of flight time were not uncommon, and though longer flights were likely for planes with damaged engines, average flight time was closer to six to eight hours.

==== Primitive conditions on flights ====
Conditions on the plane were primitive. There were no bathrooms, and no kitchen, despite the long flight times. "Breathing was possible only by wearing an oxygen mask above 10,000 feet in altitude. The mask often froze to the wearer's face". Of greatest difficulty, besides the extremely cramped quarters, "there was no heat, despite temperatures that at 20,000 feet and higher got as low as 40 or even 50 degrees below zero." The wind blew constantly through the plane, especially when the bomb bay doors were open, causing greater cold and discomfort. The crew could urinate only through two relief tubes, one forward and one aft, but due to the extreme cold and heavy layers of clothing, this could be a slow, painful, and difficult process, where the men could risk frostbite. Not uncommonly, the urine in the relief tubes froze. Perspiration, not uncommon with the physical work and heavy clothing worn, could also freeze.

In comparison with its contemporaries, including the B-17 bomber, the B-24 was relatively difficult to fly and had poorer performance at low-speed, although it was considered a fast and long range bomber for the era, and regularly completed trans-Pacific flights. Making it a somewhat easier target for ground-based anti-aircraft, it also had a lower ceiling and lacking the strength of the Boeing B-17 Flying Fortress, it could tolerate less damage. Remarkably vulnerable in some respects, the plane, perhaps to reduce weight, had an "aluminum skin that could be cut with a knife". According to Ambrose, damage to the wings could be more costly than on the B-17. At approximately 18,500 units – including 8,685 manufactured by Ford Motor Company – it holds records as the world's most produced bomber, heavy bomber, multi-engine aircraft, and American military aircraft in history.

=== Odds of surviving 35 missions ===
The chances of survival were poor. In its early operations, McGovern's 15th Air Force had 3,544 B-24s and 1,407 B-17s. In its first year and a half, before McGovern completed his training, the 15th had 1,756 B-24's and 624 B-17s shot down, representing very close to a 50% loss rate for B-24s. The odds for McGovern on his first bombing flight in late 1944 of completing his required 35 missions without suffering a casualty, capture, or death were only somewhat better.

=== Crew on the Dakota Queen ===
Lt. George McGovern, pilot
Lt. Ralph "Bill" Rounds, co-Pilot, fun loving, womanizer and outstanding formation flyer, had wanted to be a fighter pilot
Sgt. Kenneth Higgins, Radioman, a wit that could "deflate pomposity"
Lt. Carroll Woodrow "C.W." Cooper, navigator
Sgt. Isador Irving Seigal, tail gunner, eccentric, slept with a loaded gun, but spoke well of McGovern
Sgt. William "Tex" Ashlock, waist gunner, a Texan with a "soft drawl and competent manner"
Sgt. Robert O'Connell, nose gunner, excellent poker player
Sgt. Mike Valko, flight engineer, short, drinker, but highly submissive to McGovern's wishes
Sgt. William McAfee, ball turret gunner, happy-go-lucky and popular
Lt. Sam Adams, navigator and bombardier, intelligent, well-read intense, planned to become a minister
Marion Colvert, substitute navigator when McGovern landed the B-24 with the blown tire, a Kansas native and former college linebacker at Kansas State
Sgt. John B. Mills, tall tail gunner, replaced Siegal who had to be voted out. Relaxed enough to sleep on return flights.

The background and an occasional mention of nearly each crew member is provided in the novel.

=== Bombing Ploesti ===
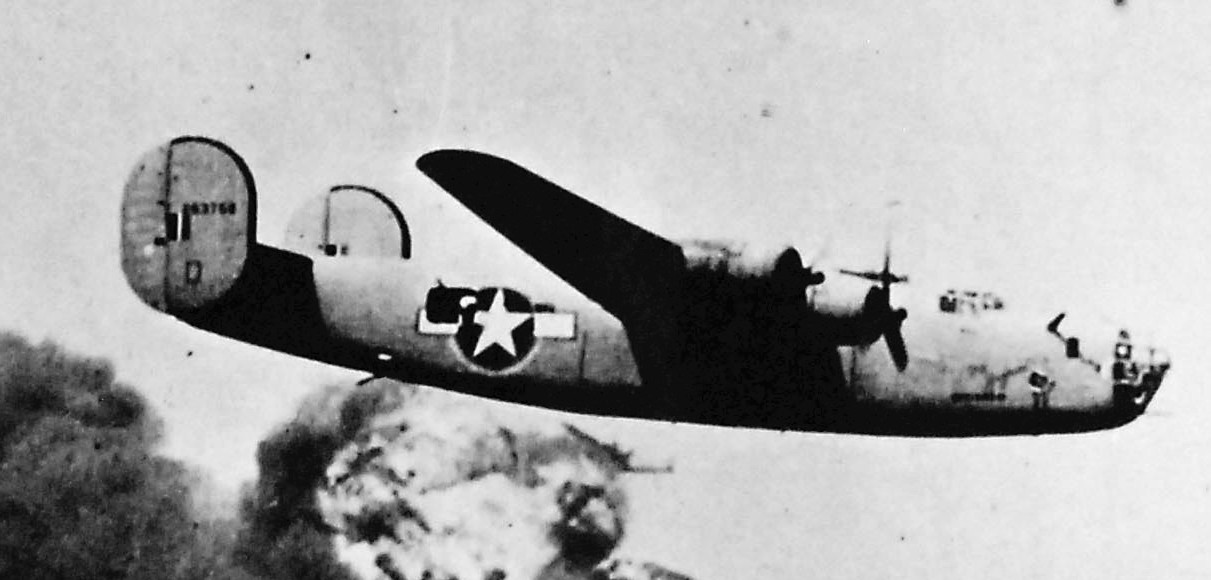
Low altitude B‑24 bombing Ploesti Oil Fields

Before McGovern had trained, 177 B-24's of the Eighth Airforce carried out one of its most important, if not fully successful missions, bombing the oil refineries in Ploesti, Romania that produced 60% of the oil for the German military. Unfortunately, the planes were scattered by too many cumulus clouds and though they lacked cohesion, still faced severe fire from German ground forces and air defenses. Though much of the refinery was destroyed, 54 B-24s were lost, nearly one-third of the entire force. Though the 8th would continue raids on Ploesti, the loss of so many pilots and crews forced the Air Corps to speed up their pilot training to keep pace with the increased number of B-24's being produced. This ramp up affected McGovern's training, increasing the pressures and pace, but perhaps not the quality.

=== Awarded Distinguished Flying Cross ===
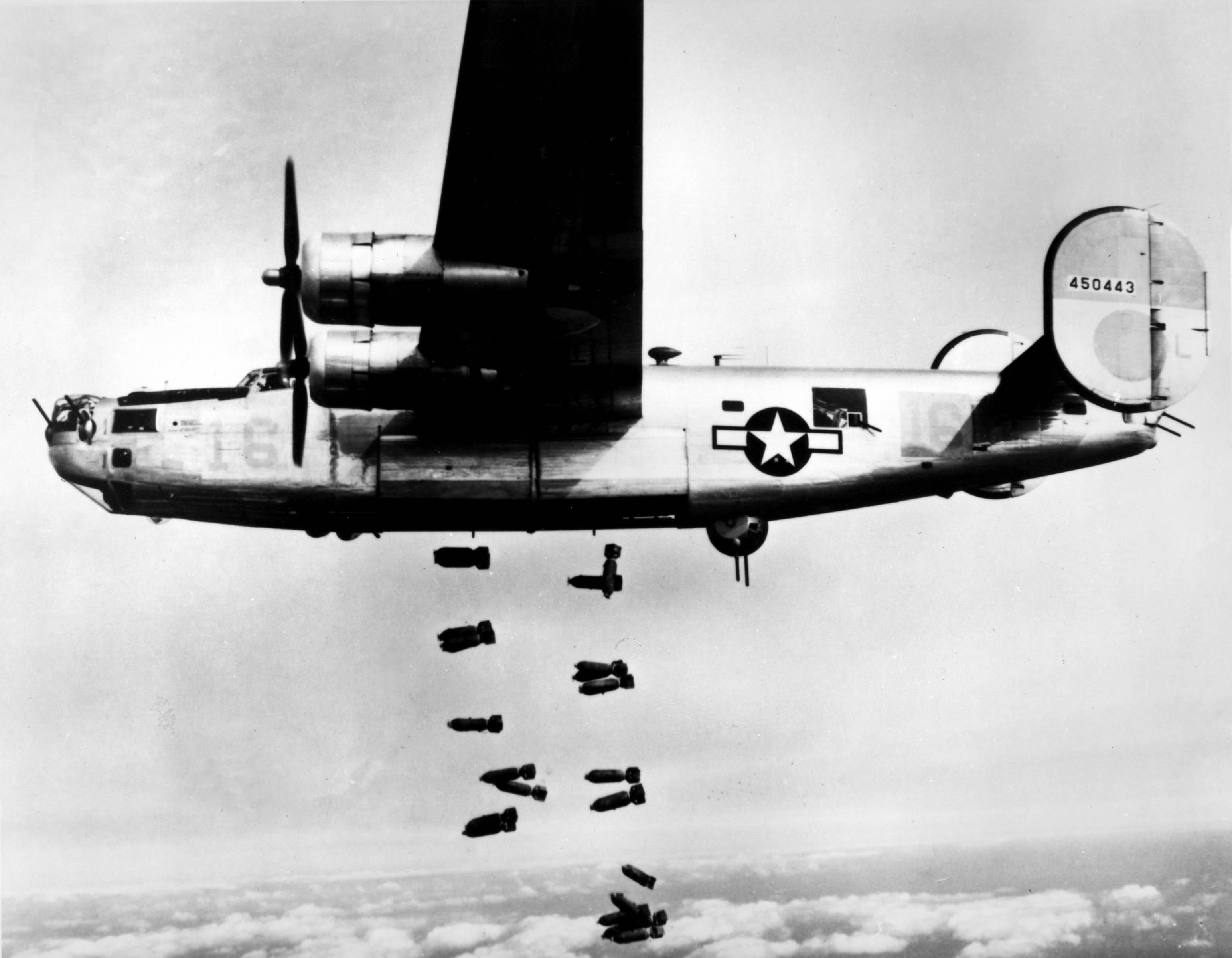
A B‑24 Liberator of the 15th Air Force's 451st Bombardment Group on mission over Germany

As detailed expertly by Ambrose, the B-24 bomber's chief pilot and commander, George McGovern, received the Distinguished Flying Cross for making several difficult landings after returning from his bombing missions in damaged planes. On only his second bombing run on December 15, 1944, the windshield of McGovern's B-24 was broken by a piece of flak that might have ended his life, missing him by inches as it passed by his left shoulder, yet he continued on and completed his mission undisturbed. McGovern was so relieved to have survived the mission that he kept the flak as a souvenir for years.

==== Blown wheel to Odertal, Germany ====
On his third mission on December 16, 1944, McGovern and his crew survived a blown wheel on the always-dangerous take-off of his B-24. Unable to stop the airplane on the runway in time to abort the mission, McGovern took off knowing he faced a dangerous landing on his return. Flying with the blown wheel, he then completed a stressful mission bombing an oil refinery in Odertal, Germany. Arriving back at his base in Cerignola, Italy after a mission of roughly 1400 miles taking roughly around seven hours and thirty minutes after forming up, he performed a well executed landing putting all of the B-24's weight on only the main and nose wheel without causing any additional damage to the plane. The throttles controlling the engines on each side of the aircraft had to be perfectly balanced to keep the B-24 centered on the runway. McGovern described it as "the best landing I'd ever made in my life". The skill and judgement he demonstrated was the birth of his reputation as an exceptional pilot, and was the source of his first recommendation for a Distinguished Flying Cross.

==== Mission to Pilsen, Czechoslovakia ====
On a December 20, 1944 mission against the Škoda Works at Pilsen, Czechoslovakia. The city was heavily defended, as it was a primary manufacturer of arms for the German military. McGovern's plane had lost one engine shortly outside of Pilsen and another was in flames after being hit by flak. Losing altitude, the bomber crew threw ammunition, guns, oxygen tanks, flak jackets, and other items out of the plane to reduce weight. Unable to return to Italy, McGovern flew to a British airfield on Vis, a small island in the Adriatic Sea off the Yugoslav coast that was controlled by Josip Broz Tito's Partisans. The short field, normally used by small fighter planes, was so unforgiving to four-engined aircraft that many of the bomber crews who tried to make emergency landings there perished. The field was only 2,200 yards long, and the B-24 generally needed 5,000 yards to safely land. Adding more complexity to the flight, McGovern's B-24, in addition to having two of four engines gone, had to earlier correct damage to the third. There was only two engines working with full efficiency and the crippled B-24 was losing gas. But McGovern successfully landed, after he and his co-pilot Rounds braked strongly but carefully at the beginning of the short runway, until the plane stopped, causing rubber to burn and tires to shriek. At approximately six to eight hours for the roughly 1100 mile roundtrip flight with two engines malfunctioning on the return, the pilots would have been fatigued. McGovern managed to save his crew, the primary feat for which he was awarded the Distinguished Flying Cross some months later. After he exited his plane, McGovern watched another B-24 crash on attempting to land. McGovern's medal praised him for "having a high degree of courage and piloting skill".

==== 35th and final mission ====
McGovern's 35th mission from Cerignola on April 25, 1945, the last of the 15th Air Force's requirement for a combat tour, was against heavily defended Linz, Austria. Though given the option of a safer run, McGovern chose the more dangerous and heavily defended Linz. The sky was black and red with flak, and McGovern's "Dakota Queen", named after his wife Eleanor, was hit multiple times, resulting in 110 holes in its fuselage and wings and an inoperative hydraulic system. McGovern's waist gunner was injured, and his flight engineer was so unnerved by his experience that he would subsequently be hospitalized with battle fatigue, but McGovern managed to bring back the plane safely with the assistance of an improvised landing technique. To slow the plane on the runway, McGovern carefully hit the brakes immediately on landing, and the crew threw out two parachutes that had been attached by their harnesses to the yokes of the waist guns on each side of the plane. With the hydraulics out, before landing, crew members laboriously hand cranked the landing gear to engage it. At an average cruising speed of around 200 miles per hour with all four engines operational, and a round trip distance of roughly 1000 miles, the complete flight could have taken between five and six hours or more.

=== Delivering food ===
In May and June 1945, following the end of the European war, McGovern continued with the 741st Bomb Squadron delivering surplus food and supplies near Trieste in Northeastern Italy; this was then trucked to the hungry in nearby locations, including to German prisoners of war. The experience would influence him, and in his late career, he would serve as United States Ambassador to the United Nations Agencies for Food and Agriculture and on the United States Senate Select Committee on Nutrition and Human Needs. He was appointed the first UN global ambassador on world hunger by the World Food Programme in 2001, and in his early career during the Kennedy administration, he served as the Director of Food for Peace. The roles helped to combat global hunger and provide information on nutrition.

== Critical reviews ==
Kirkus Reviews notes one of the strengths of the book was Ambrose's ability to explore the former lives of McGovern and his crew, and answer the question "From whence came such men?” The review describes McGovern’s background (his father was a preacher), then follows him (and others) "through the arduous and highly competitive training process." Kirkus describes McGovern's love for debate in High School, his desire to obtain a quality education, and the great importance his father, as a member of the clergy, placed on serving one's fellow man through hard work and discipline. These influences followed McGovern throughout his life as he furthered his education after leaving the service by using the G.I. Bill to graduate from Dakota Wesleyan University and then receiving a Ph.D. in History from Northwestern University. After losing his run for President in 1972, he worked in a variety of programs to combat global poverty. In his hopes to bring the Vietnam war to a quicker conclusion, as outlined in the Hatfield-McGovern Amendment which he co-authored, McGovern may have wished to relieve America of the burden of war he had known so well as a WWII B-24 bomber pilot. The reviewer believes the novel is rich in "nostalgia and admiration" for the pilots and the era, but lacks thorough analysis. Nonetheless, like many of Ambrose's works, it is a tantalizing and enjoyable read, and loaded with well-researched history of the B-24s and the pilot's lives, particularly McGovern's.

The Capital Times noted that the book was well received and that among McGovern's humanitarian work after losing the 1972 election to Richard Nixon was founding the Teresa McGovern Center in 1996. The Center treated as many as 400 cases of drug addiction and alcoholism a year.

Richard Pearson of the Washington Post wrote that Ambrose's sentimentality and nostalgia concerning his subject and characters may have been the result of his feelings after completing his history of Eisenhower, as he "thought the returning veterans were giants who had saved the world from barbarism". Dr. Ambrose considered himself a hero worshipper, and once remarked to a reporter "that he came to this form of history from...childhood memories of returning World War II soldiers." This depiction of greatness and feelings of admiration for the bomber crews pervades the pages of his novel, and may be too much for those who search for an objective analysis of the second World War, or expect Ambrose to find character flaws in the historic novel's central characters.

The Enotes review of Ambrose's novel notes the more informal nature of the Army Air Corps, and insightfully notes "This was a discrete culture within the armed forces, and the reason for the difference had to do with the nature of their mission. Although bombers flew in massed formations, the men on board had to function as a cohesive unit." At any given time, the lives of the entire crew might depend on a co-pilot, a tailgunner, a crewman acting as a medic, or the chief pilot himself. The review praises Ambrose for describing accurately the cohesiveness of McGovern's crew, and the great value of each member of the team. As the review notes, "A mistake by a single crew member could mean disaster for the plane and the nearby planes". In reference to the hardships faced by bomber pilots and crew who were still required to perform flawlessly, Enotes wrote that the pilot's and crew's service life "was a precarious arrangement that left precious little room for error by the pilots, who were expected to sleep in tents and consume wretched food." Enotes also praises the author for depicting the incredibly dangerous nature of formation bombing used by the B-17, and writes "Ambrose reveals the truly shocking nature of aerial bombardment. Some planes failed to hold their place in formation and collided with their fellow bombers; others drifted slightly and dropped their bomb loads on other B-24’s; and some just exploded for no apparent reason, with the 8,000-pound load all but vaporizing the plane."
