= Citizen Soldiers =

1997 non-fiction book about World War II written by Stephen E. Ambrose

- First edition
- Author: Stephen E. Ambrose
- Language: English
- Subject: Historical
- Genre: Non-fiction
- Publisher: Simon & Schuster
- Publication date: November 3, 1997 (hardcover)
- Publication place: United States
- Media type: Print (hardcover and paperback)
- Pages: 512 (hardcover) and 528 (paperback)
- ISBN: 0-684-81525-7 (hardcover)
- OCLC: 37201388

Citizen Soldiers: The U.S. Army from the Normandy Beaches to the Bulge to the Surrender of Germany is a non-fiction book about World War II written by Stephen E. Ambrose and published in 1997. It deals with Allied soldiers moving in from the Normandy beaches, and through Europe (between June 7, 1944, and May 7, 1945). In addition to telling short stories of countless soldiers experiencing the war, the author also explains the events before telling the stories. He interviewed dozens of soldiers in the making of the book.

The book picks up where his previous book describing the preparations and execution of the Normandy Landings, D-Day, June 6, 1944: The Climactic Battle of World War II, left off.

== Reception ==
The book was well received and became a New York Times best seller. Notable figures such as Colin Powell have praised the book. The Wall Street Journal has also credited the book.
