= William McKie (musician) =

Australian organist, conductor, and composer (1901–1984)

1954 portrait photograph of Sir William McKie by Walter Stoneman

Sir William Neil McKie MVO (22 May 1901 – 1 December 1984) was an Australian organist, conductor, and composer. He was Organist and Master of the Choristers at Westminster Abbey 1941–1963 and noted for his direction of the music for the marriage of Princess Elizabeth in 1947, and later her Coronation in 1953.

== Birth and studies ==
William McKie was born in the suburb of Collingwood, Melbourne, the son of William McKie, who was vicar of Collingwood at the time; his brother was John McKie, Bishop of Geelong (coadjutor bishop in Melbourne). He studied the organ at Melbourne Grammar School under Dr Arthur Nickson (1876–1964), and in 1919 won the prestigious Clarke Scholarship from the University of Melbourne which enabled him to study at the Royal College of Music, London. Following this he became Organ Scholar of Worcester College, Oxford, where he gained his MA and BMus degrees.

== Early career ==
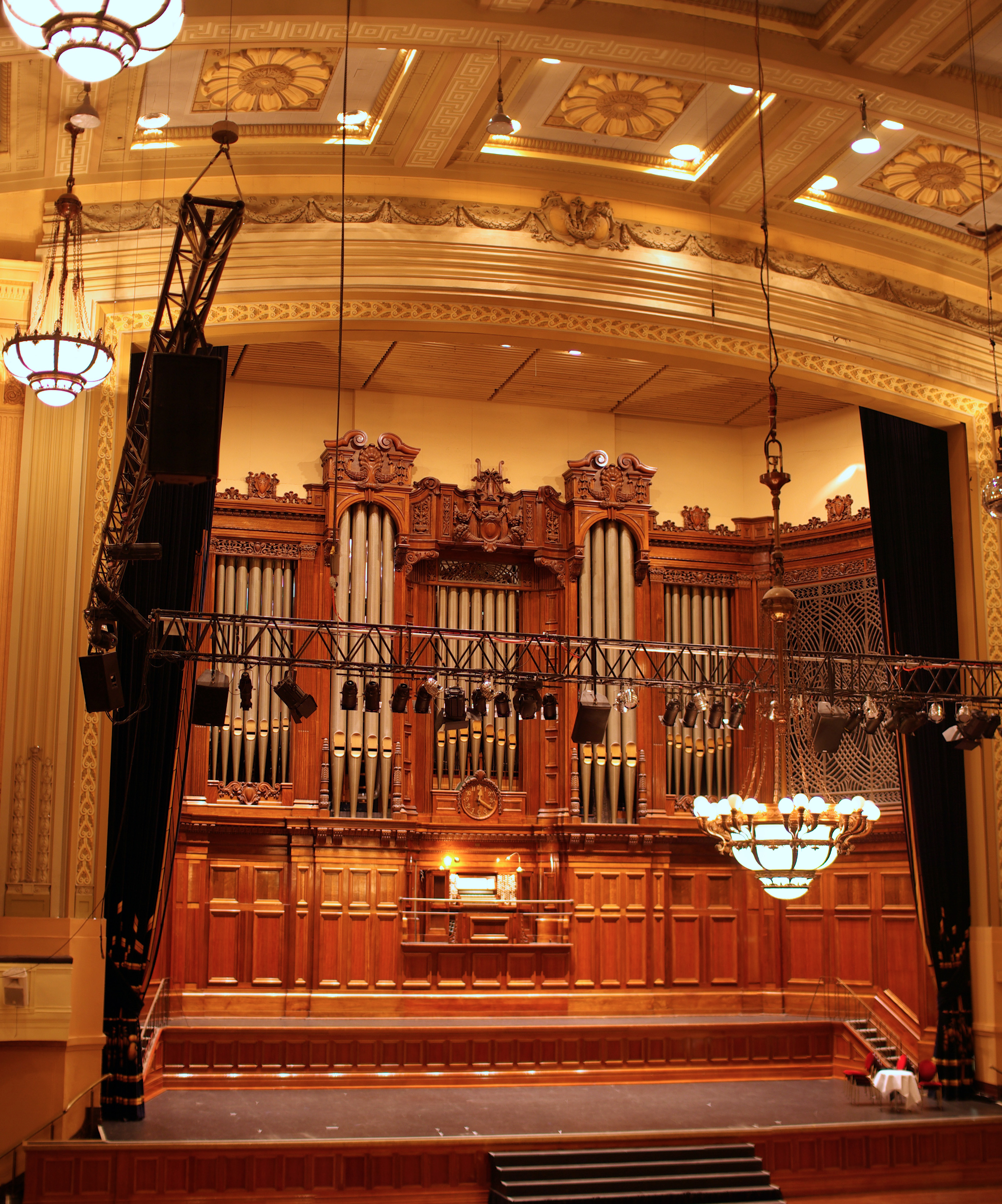
McKie gave popular recitals on the Grand Organ at Melbourne Town Hall in the 1930s

In 1926 McKie took up his first professional appointment as Director of Music of Clifton College, Bristol, and is now perhaps the most famous of all Cliftonian organists. In 1930 he was selected by the Melbourne City Council to succeed W. G. Price as Melbourne City Organist and Musical Advisor to the City Council. He gave regular and popular lunch-time recitals at Melbourne Town Hall for seven years in this capacity, commencing 8 April 1931. As city organist he proved an effective administrator in organising festivals including Melbourne's enormous Bach Festival of 1932, the first such festival in Australia, and the Bach-Elgar Festival of 1934. In 1934 while continuing as Melbourne City Organist he was appointed Director of Music at Geelong Grammar School by the then headmaster, James Ralph Darling.

== England and the Coronation of Elizabeth II ==
In 1938 McKie resigned the post of Melbourne City Organist and moved to England to take up the position of Organist of Magdalen College, Oxford, succeeding Haldane Campbell Stewart, a move which would see him become one of the most prominent church musicians of his day: in September 1941 he was appointed Organist and Master of the Choristers at Westminster Abbey when Paul de Labilliere was Dean; a position that he held until his retirement in 1963. Owing to war service, McKie was unable to take up his post until 1946, so the Sub-Organist Dr. Osborne Peasgood (1902–1962) acted in his stead. McKie was responsible for reforming the Abbey Choir after the war, and in 1947 directed the music for the marriage of Princess Elizabeth and the Duke of Edinburgh, for which he composed his most famous work, We wait for thy loving kindness, O God. For this service he was appointed a Member of the Royal Victorian Order (MVO).

The highlight of William McKie's career came with the Coronation of Elizabeth II on 2 June 1953. In Westminster Abbey there were 8,000 guests, a choir of nearly 400, an orchestra of 60, and military trumpeters. The Musical Times reported that the musical arrangements, under the ultimate direction of McKie, went "without a hitch. They might, like the choice of music, be different; they could hardly have been bettered." McKie chose music which was eclectic; both new and old, and using music from previous coronations. McKie was knighted in the Coronation Honours, announced the day before the Coronation.

Later, McKie was to direct the music for the marriage of Princess Margaret in 1960; for this occasion he composed a setting of Psalm 121 and of the Wedding Responses from the Book of Common Prayer.

== Family and retirement ==
McKie married Phyllis Ross, a Canadian widow, in Westminster Abbey on 5 April 1956. They had no children. In 1963, after 22 years at Westminster Abbey, McKie retired to Kent.

In 1964, on a visit to Norway, McKie was appointed a Commander with Star of the Royal Order of St. Olav.

McKie was a vice-president of the Percy Grainger Festival, held in London in 1970, and successfully lobbied the Australian government for financial assistance. In the same year he moved to Ottawa, Ontario, Canada, where he lived until his death in December 1984. McKie is buried in the West Cloister of Westminster Abbey. Lady McKie died on 12 January 1983.

He was the great-uncle by marriage of bass-baritone Gerald Finley and encouraged him in his early musical education.

In 1991 the Sir William McKie Memorial Trust published The Best of Both Worlds: A Life of Sir William McKie by Howard Hollis.

== Works ==
- We wait for thy loving kindness, O God, for choir and organ, 1947
- Psalm CXXI and the Wedding Responses, 1960
- Romance in G, for organ

== Portrayals ==
McKie was portrayed by Ewan Bailey in Sarah Wooley's audio drama People Everywhere Will Sing, which was broadcast on BBC Radio 3 in 2022. The end of the drama includes a reminiscence of McKie by a former student.

== Oral history ==
McKie was interviewed in 1970 by Hazel de Berg about his life and career. The recording can be found at the National Library of Australia.

== Notes ==
Cultural offices
Preceded by Ernest Bullock	Organist and Master of the Choristers of Westminster Abbey; 1941–1963	Succeeded by Douglas Guest
