= Phyllis McKie =

Canadian historian and photographer

Phyllis Gertrude McKie, Lady McKie was a Canadian historian and photographer from Montreal who died in 1983. She was born Phyllis Ross but became Phyllis Birks in 1929 upon her marriage to Gerald Walker Birks, a son of the Montreal businessman Henry Birks. She was widowed, and upon her second marriage, in 1956 to the musician Sir William McKie, she became Lady McKie. She continued however to use the surname "Ross" for professional purposes.

Her principal work is perhaps The Seaflower Venture, a fictionalized account of the life of the 18th-century merchant Charles Robin.

Her papers and photographs are in multiple locations: among them are the archives of the Société Jersiaise; the Cambridge University Library (Royal Commonwealth Society Library); the Maritime History Archive of the Memorial University of Newfoundland; and the Library and Archives of Canada.

She was a great-aunt of the bass-baritone Gerald Finley, and her husband Sir William did much to encourage him in the early stages of his musical education.
