= John Nixon =

John Nixon is the name of:

== Politicians ==
- John Nixon (MP), member of the Long Parliament in England, representing Oxford City 1646–1648
- John T. Nixon (1820–1889), U.S. Representative from New Jersey
- John William Nixon (1880–1949), Unionist politician in Northern Ireland

== Military figures ==
- John Nixon (Continental Army general) (1727–1815), Continental Army general from Massachusetts during the American Revolution
- John Nixon (financier) (1733–1808), Philadelphia merchant and militia officer during the American Revolution
- John Nixon (Indian Army officer) (1857–1921), lieutenant general in the British Indian Army

== Others ==
- John Nixon, Armagh, Irish Republican, see 1981 Irish hunger strike#1980 hunger strike
- John Nixon, Australian artist, director of Institute of Modern Art 1980–82
- John Nixon (mining engineer) (1815–1899), English mining engineer
- John B. Nixon (1928–2005), murderer in Mississippi, USA
- John E. Nixon, director of Michigan state Budget office
- John Colley Nixon (died 1818), English merchant and amateur artist
- John Trice Nixon (1933–2019), U.S. federal judge
- John Nixon (planter), planter in Jamaica
