= W. G. Price =

English and Australian organist (1865–1952)

William George Price (1 February 1865 – 15 January 1952) was a musician, Melbourne City Organist from 1906 to 1930. Aside from his musical ability, he was renowned for "his flowing bow tie, white hair, and large moustache".

== Early life ==
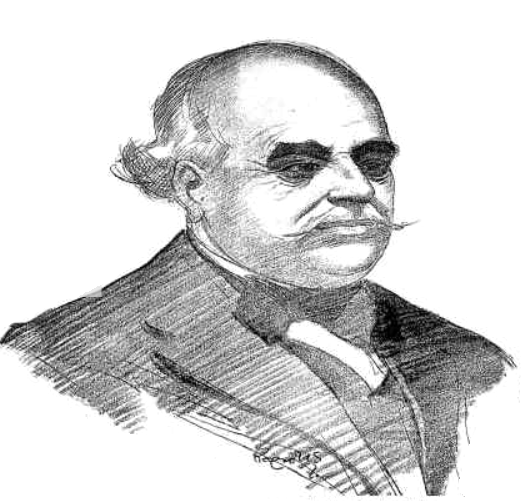
1930 portrait by Reynolds

Price was born in Newport, Essex, England, a son of William Price, a church organist. After some early studies, at age 16 he has appointed organist of the parish church at Holbeach, later assistant organist of Ely Cathedral, under Dr Edmund Thomas Chipp.

Price gained his doctor of music of the University of Oxford.

He was appointed city organist to the corporation of Belfast in the beginning of 1904, when they had the Ulster hall renovated and the organ repaired and enlarged.

== Move to Australia ==
Melbourne Town Hall had a Hill and Son organ, built in 1872, that by 1900 was generally considered to be in need of a major upgrade. The original manufacturers recommended conversion of its complex system of bars and levers (tracker action) to pneumatic action, but with a view to future building modifications and after consulting Frederick Bridge and T. H. Collinson (organist of St Mary's Cathedral and the University of Edinburgh), the council decided on the electro-pneumatic action, and in 1903 consulted the specialists, Ingram, Hope-Jones and Co. of London, for a quote, and awarded them the contract at a cost of £4,500. The work was completed in July 1906, and the organ was now reckoned to be the finest in the world; not quite as large as the Sydney Town Hall Grand Organ, but more advanced in its capabilities. It was subjected to a series of recitals by E. H. Lemare, who was to have given his imprimatur before final payment was made. The concerts were a success but Lemare never gave such approval, however in a later interview he said of the console that it was too complicated, and the electric action was excessively noisy. The council decided to employ an experienced British organist for 12 months to get the instrument established in the city's musical culture, and placed advertisements in appropriate trade magazines. The selection committee (the same Bridge and Collinson) chose William George Price.

In 1906, Price was contracted by the Melbourne City Council to give weekly recitals for a period of twelve months. He travelled to Adelaide on the RMS India and arrived in Melbourne by the Express on 10 September 1906. His first recital, on 6 October, was well received by a capacity audience. Subsequent attendances were disappointing, but increased over the succeeding weeks, from 200 to 400, such that the Council decided to offer him the position of City Organist. Price was agreeable to settling in Melbourne, so his contract was extended in June 1907 by a further three years at £400 per annum.

His recitals, whose audiences were predominantly male, included his own compositions, which were well received.

In 1912 he took on the additional role of organist and choirmaster of St John's Anglican Church, Toorak, a position he held for nearly four years. He was succeeded by A. H. Nickson. He took private students, also served as lecturer and examiner on the staff of the University of Melbourne Conservatorium of Music.

In the early hours of Sunday 1 February 1925 the concert hall of Melbourne Town Hall was destroyed by fire, and with it the Hill and Son organ. The Town Hall was largely rebuilt on the existing site at the corner of Swanston and Collins streets, but extended over the area previously occupied by the Victoria Coffee Palace. The decision on specification and construction of the new organ was left to Price and the organ attendant, H. M. Palmer. A primary consideration was that it should be in no way inferior to its Sydney counterpart.

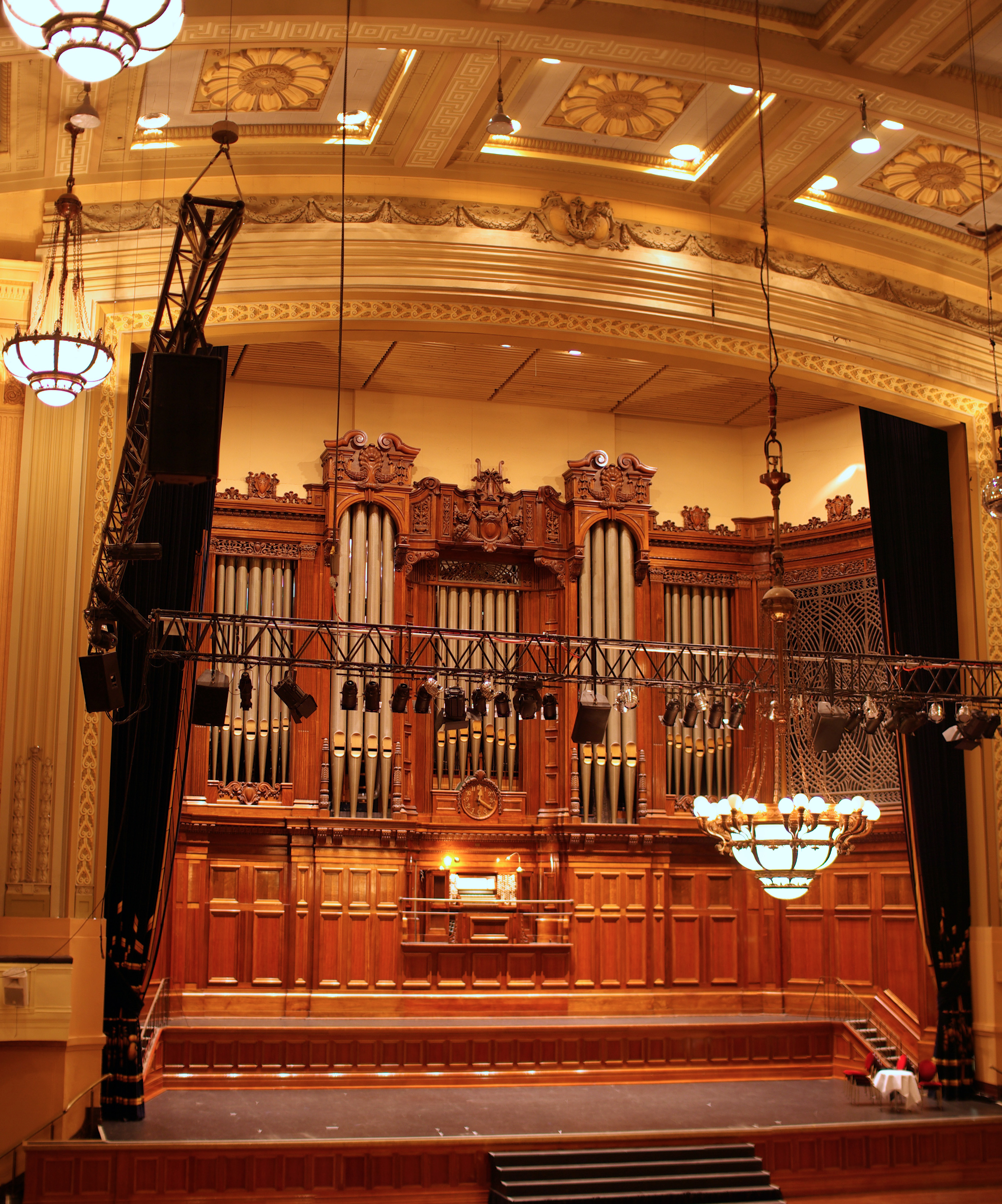
Hill and Son organ in Melbourne Town Hall; designed by Price

The tender of £28,500, by William Hill and Son, for a replacement organ was accepted by Council in October 1926 A separate tender, for the framework of Australian timber, was published separately.

When the council announced that an organist of international repute would be called on to open the new instrument, (Joseph Bonnett had been mentioned) at least one fellow musician sympathised with Price for this affront. A further insult was leveled at Price when a sub-committee argued that, despite being under contract, his salary should be halved.

Price was require to retire, at age 65, on 1 February 1930, and preparations were made for appointment of his successor, who would be contracted for 12 months for £735 (700 guineas). He had his first experience of playing the new instrument in June 1929, and was delighted with its responsiveness. He gave the first recital to civic dignitaries and invited guests on 27 June, then a public performance to an audience of 2,500 on 3 July, with an almost identical programme, acclaimed as a triumph. Faced with compulsory retirement, Price received considerable support from the Sun newspaper and from fellow organists.

In December 1929 he was invited to Dunedin, New Zealand to take charge of a new Hill and Son organ. Before leaving he gave a farewell concert on 23 January 1930 which was well attended by enthusiasts and well-wishers, and broadcast over 3UZ. His recital was augmented by solos from soprano Saffo Arnav (successively married to Jack Buchanan and William G. James) and the violinist Cecil Parkes, with accompanist May Roderick. Use of the Town Hall was given free of charge as a benefit to Dr Price.

Price received an enthusiastic reception at Dunedin Town Hall, and his recitals "delighted large audiences". He returned to Melbourne in August, and immediately announced plans for further concerts, also a return season in New Zealand.

He died at his home, "Woodlands", 1377 Dandenong Road, Oakleigh, Victoria, and his remains were cremated.

== Postscript ==
Price's replacement as City Organist, William McKie, was a son of Rev. William McKie, vicar of Holy Trinity Church, Port Melbourne, and his mother was one of the first women graduates of Melbourne University. Despite entreaties by enthusiasts, the post of City Organist was under threat of dissolution. In July 1938 McKie returned to London, where he had accepted the post of organist of Magdalen College, Oxford as successor to Dr Haldane Campbell Stewart. McKie rose to fame as organist to Westminster Abbey and knighthood in 1953.

Price returned to the organist's stool for at least one special occasion: the marriage of his grandson William Lionel Price to Edna Belle Richards at St Martin's Church, Hawksburn, on 12 August 1939.

== Family ==
Price was married to Mary Lawson Price (died 25 September 1932); their family included:

- Edgar Alexander "Bunny" Price (c. 1888 – 14 October 1946)
- Madge "Peggy" Swallow, née Price (died 3 July 1948)
- Violet Price
- William James Price (c. 1890 – 12 May 1953)

He married again sometime before 1938; His second wife, Amelia Cameron Price, died 10 January 1975 (from Ryerson Index).
