= To America =

First edition (publ. Simon & Schuster)

To America: Personal Reflections of an Historian is the somewhat-autobiography and memoir of Stephen Ambrose by Stephen E. Ambrose. The 2002 book talks about his perspective on issues throughout American History, as well as his various experiences that have slowly shaped him into the person he was. It also covers topics, such as Western expansion and The Transcontinental Railroad. It was written only months before he died in October 2002.
