= Nothing Like It in the World =

2000 book by Stephen Ambrose

- First edition
- Author: Stephen E. Ambrose
- Language: English
- Subject: Transcontinental Railroad History
- Genre: Non-fiction
- Publisher: Simon & Schuster ( by Ambrose-Tubbs, Inc.)
- Publication date: August 2000
- Publication place: United States
- Media type: Print (Hardcover & Paperback); Audio cassette
- Pages: 432 pp
- ISBN: 978-0-7432-0430-9
- OCLC: 44967527

Nothing Like It In the World is a narrative history of the planning and construction of the Pacific Railroad during the 1860s which connected the San Francisco Bay and Council Bluffs, Iowa by rail. Written by popular historian Stephen Ambrose, it was first published in August 2000, by Simon & Schuster.

== Editing and fact-checking issues ==
When published in the late summer of 2000, Nothing Like It in the World was, like many of Ambrose's previous books, an immediate commercial success and quickly reached the "Number 1" position on the New York Times Best Seller List (Non-Fiction) on September 17, 2000. However, as were many of Ambrose's other late-career works (particularly the fifteen books released between 1990 and 2003, the year after his death), it was also produced under the auspices of (and copyrighted by) Ambrose-Tubbs Inc, the Ambrose family's commercial organization based in Helena, Montana.

Although Ambrose was a retired university history professor, the book was written as a non-academic "popular history" aimed at a large general interest audience. While the manuscript was reviewed by the retired Valuation Engineer of the Southern Pacific Railroad who vetted and corrected all the errors made by Ambrose, none of these corrections were incorporated by the publisher, and it was released with all the errors and misstatements intact. The manuscript was also not peer-reviewed for accuracy and sourcing by any other experts on railroad history or outside scholars as would have likely been the case if it had been published by a university press or under the aegis of an academic journal, but instead it was edited and fact-checked only by publisher Simon & Schuster's Editorial Director, Alice Mayhew, Ambrose's longtime editor whom he also credited with originally suggesting the project to him.

While originally well received by the public at large, many reviews of the book by professional historians and other scholars, researchers, and experts in the field appearing in the weeks and months after its release were highly critical of the work as being poorly researched and edited as well as inadequately fact checked. Several longer form papers and commentaries were also produced by well-known experts on the history of the Pacific Railroad which documented in detail that the book was rife with factual errors, misquotes, contradictions, demonstrably misleading and/or inaccurate statements, and unsupported conclusions.

The most extensive of those papers was first reported in a front-page article published in The Sacramento Bee on January 1, 2001, entitled Area Historians Rail Against Inaccuracies in Book that listed more than sixty instances identified as "significant errors, misstatements, and made-up quotes" in the book which were documented in the detailed December 2000, fact-checking study entitled "The Sins of Stephen E. Ambrose" compiled by three longtime Western US railroad historians, researchers, consultants, and collectors who specialize in the Pacific Railroad and related topics.

On January 11, 2001, Washington Post columnist Lloyd Grove reported in his column, "The Reliable Source", that a co-worker had found a "serious historical error" in the same book that "a chastened Ambrose" promised to correct in future editions. Some journal reviews also sharply criticized the research and fact-checking in the book. Among academic reviewers, University of Notre Dame history professor Walter Nugent observed that it contained "annoying slips" such as mislabeled maps, inaccurate dates, geographical errors, and misidentified word origins, while Don L. Hofsommer of St. Cloud University, the author of eleven books on the history of railroads in the American West, agreed that the book "confuses facts" and that "The research might best be characterized as 'once over lightly'."
