= Edward McGeachy =

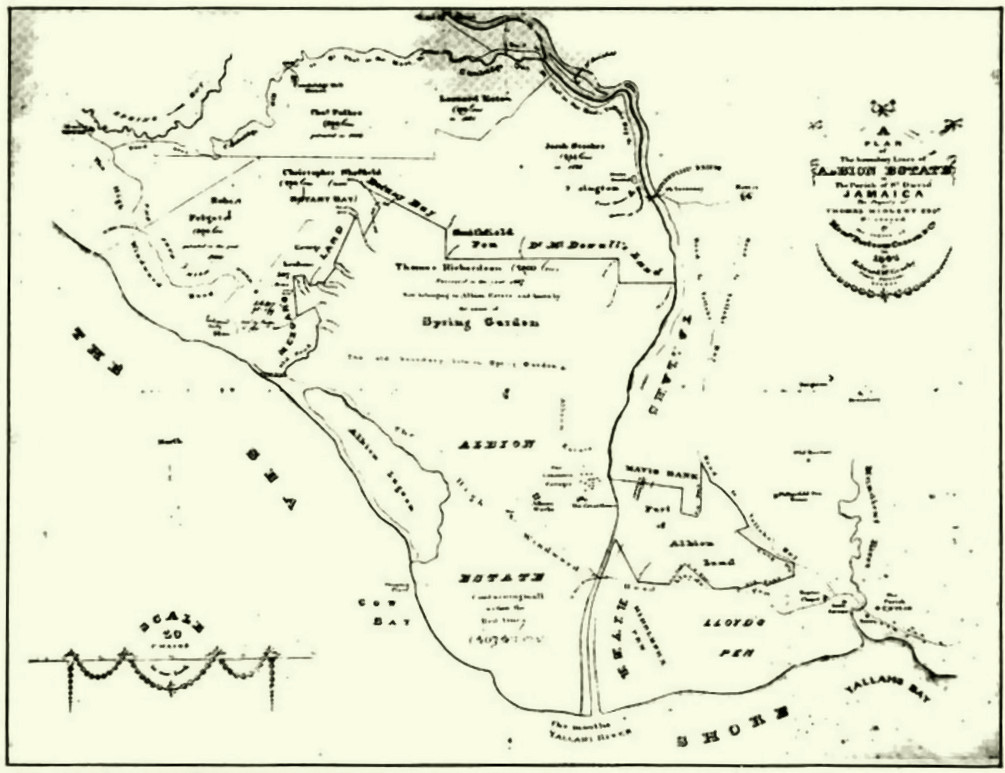
1842 plan of Albion Estate by Edward McGeachy

Edward McGeachy (died c. 1851) was the Crown Surveyor for the county of Surrey in Jamaica. He trained Thomas Harrison, the first Government Surveyor of Jamaica. He owned Bull Park plantation and Brighton Pen in Saint David Parish and in 1837 received compensation for the loss of eight slaves following the abolition of slavery in the British Empire in 1833.

== Early life and family ==
McGeachy's place and date of birth are unknown, but he described himself as a "colonist" of Jamaica and as having learned surveying "at school". He served a five-year apprenticeship with Francis Ramsay.

He married Margaret and they had daughters Rosa, Emma, Ada, and Margaret, and a son Charles Edward Alleyne McGeachy, indicating a family connection to the Alleynes of Barbados.

== Career ==
After the completion of his apprenticeship, McGeachy was in partnership with Francis Ramsay before working on his own from 1824. He was with McGeachy, Dadley & Smith from 1826 to 1828 in partnership with former apprentices, and McGeachy & Smith by 1830. He was a sole trader from 1836 to 1843 and in partnership as McGeachy and Griffiths from 1843 to 1851.

He was a commissioned surveyor for the Crown in Jamaica from 1820 to 1846 and the Crown Surveyor for the county of Surrey from 1837 to 1851. By 1842, McGeachy had trained 15-20 apprentices, including Thomas Harrison (c.1823 - 1894), the first Government Surveyor of Jamaica, who succeeded him as surveyor of Surrey after McGeachy's death around 1851. He proposed a "perfect" map of Jamaica, travelled to England in 1831 to promote it, obtained the agreement of a dedication from the King, and returned in January 1832. It was never completed, however, after the House of Assembly of Jamaica refused financial support due to a downturn in the plantation economy with the abolition of slavery looming.

He owned Bull Park plantation and Brighton Pen in Saint David Parish, now in Saint Thomas, and in 1837 received compensation for the loss of eight slaves following the abolition of slavery in the British Empire in 1833.

He completed historically valuable surveys across Jamaica, commenting, as did other surveyors, on the difficulty of the work, saying that "no one on the island has been more exposed to heat, and cold and wet, than I have", and noting that boundaries in Jamaica were:

little settled, as compared to other countries, boundings not walled or fenced in, and the mountainous nature of the country, rendering it almost impossible in many cases to do so. Lines become lost, and it requires a great deal of practice in the mode of discovering them, through the aid of old surveys and surveying papers...

Although contemporary sources attest to the unpleasant conditions surveyors had to contend with, including extremes of weather and mosquitoes, the hardships were sometimes mitigated by good planning and supplies. McGeachy recorded in his field notes that when surveying Fort Stewart Estate in 1843, his party comprised as many as 15 men, mostly surveying assistants of various kinds, but also a butler. Their provisions included seven loaves, a ham and a half, coffee, sugar, five bottles of rum, and four and a half bottles of wine, but they had to build their own shelter the first night they were on site.

== Selected publications ==
- Irrigation in the West Indies, Being a Simple Plan by which they may be Perpetuated as Valuable and Productive Sugar Colonies. De Cordova, Kingston, 1846.
- Suggestions towards a General Plan of Rapid Communication by Steam Navigation and Railways: shortening the Time of Transit between the Eastern and Western Hemispheres. Smith, Elder, & Co., London, 1846.
