= Robert Hibbert (merchant) =

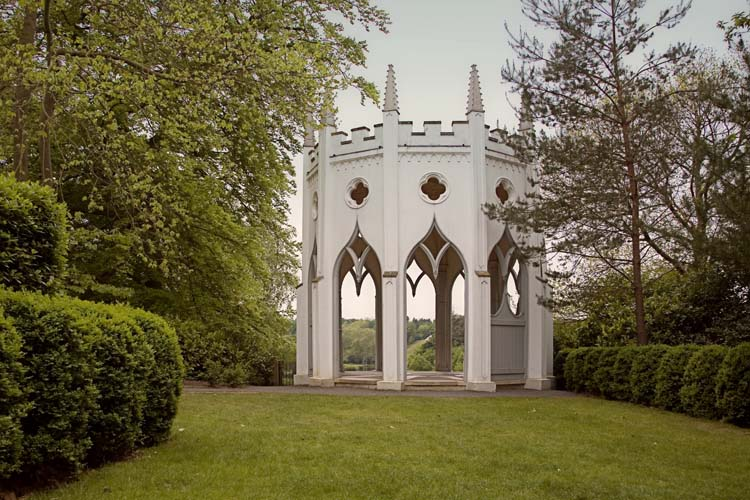
The Gothic Temple at Pains Hill

Robert Hibbert (1750–1835) was an English merchant in Kingston, Jamaica. He owned Albion plantation, owned slaves, and was a justice of the peace for Kingston, Saint George, and Saint Mary parishes.

In 1791, he purchased the original Birtles Hall in Cheshire, demolished it and built a new house, and in 1798 he purchased Pains Hill in Surrey.
