= Lewis Nixon =

Lewis Nixon may refer to:

- Lewis Nixon (naval architect) (1861–1940), shipbuilding executive, ship designer, and political activist
- Lewis Nixon III (1918–1995), World War II US Army officer in the 101st Airborne Division, known for his portrayal in the miniseries Band of Brothers, grandson of the above
