= John Nixon (planter) =

John Nixon (died by 1774) was a landowner in colonial Jamaica. He owned Albion plantation in Saint David Parish, Mullet Hall plantation in Saint Thomas in the East parish, and the land that eventually became Mavis Bank plantation.

He left over £32,000, making him the third richest person in Jamaica according to an inventory taken in 1774.
