= Undaunted Courage =

1996 biographical book by Stephen Ambrose

- Author: Stephen E. Ambrose
- Cover artist: E. S. Paxson (Lewis and Clark at Three Forks, 1912)
- Language: English
- Subject: Historical
- Genre: Non-fiction
- Publisher: Simon & Schuster
- Publication date: 1997 Hardback & 2003 Paperback
- Publication place: United States
- Media type: Print (Hardback & Paperback)
- Pages: 592 pp (paperback edition
- ISBN: 978-0-7434-7788-8
- OCLC: 56541137

Undaunted Courage: Meriwether Lewis, Thomas Jefferson, and the Opening of the American West is a 1996 biography of Meriwether Lewis of the Lewis and Clark Expedition, written by Stephen Ambrose. The book is based on journals and letters written by Lewis, William Clark, Thomas Jefferson and the members of the Corps of Discovery. While most of the book is dedicated to the expedition, several chapters are also devoted to Lewis's early life as a Virginia planter and Jefferson's personal secretary, and his later life as governor of the Louisiana Territory before his untimely death in 1809.

== Review ==
The book outlines the expedition in detail including the route, interactions with Native Americans, scientific discoveries, wildlife, and landscape. As a biography, the book is focused entirely on Lewis - Clark, Sacagawea and the others are addressed principally in their interactions with Lewis. The expedition, and Lewis' life as a whole, is placed within the broader context of Jefferson's presidency, the opening of the American west, and early Indian Policy. The text is supplemented by maps and illustrations, including some drawn by Lewis himself.

The book was number 1 New York Times Bestseller in 1996.

== Cancelled television series ==
In May 2014, HBO announced plans to produce a six-part miniseries based on the book titled Lewis and Clark. It starred Casey Affleck as Meriwether Lewis, Matthias Schoenaerts as William Clark, and Tanaya Beatty as Sacagawea, with Tom Hanks, Brad Pitt, and Edward Norton as executive producers.

Filming began in Manitoba during the summer of 2015. However, production was halted the following August after director John Curran and cinematographer Rob Hardy left the project due to creative differences.

In February 2016, HBO shut down production on the series.
