= Francis Nixon =

Francis Nixon may refer to:

- Francis A. Nixon (1878–1956), father of President Richard Nixon
- Francis Nixon (bishop) (1803–1879), Anglican bishop in Australia
- Francis Hodgson Nixon (1832–1883), Australian architect, newspaper owner and editor
- Donald Nixon (Francis Donald Nixon, 1914–1987), brother of President Richard Nixon
