= Joseph Nixon =

English footballer (1896–1977)

Personal information
- Full name: Joseph Frazer Nixon
- Date of birth: 14 July 1896
- Place of birth: Prudhoe, England
- Date of death: 1977 (aged 80–81)
- Position: Full-back

Senior career*
| Years | Team | Apps | (Gls) |
| 1920–1921 | Prudhoe Castle | | |
| 1921–1927 | Crystal Palace | 29 | (1) |
| 1927 | Prudhoe Castle | | |
| Total | | 29 | (1) |
- * Club domestic league appearances and goals

Joseph Frazer Nixon (14 July 1896 – 1977) was an English footballer who played in the Football League for Crystal Palace.
