= Thomas Nixon =

Thomas Nixon may refer to:

- Thomas Nixon (writer) (born 1961), American author and educator
- Thomas Nixon (cricketer, born 1815) (1815–1877), English cricketer and inventor
- Thomas Nixon (cricketer, born 1843) (1843–1907), English cricketer and umpire
- Tom Nixon (footballer, born 1931) (1931–2003), English footballer
- Tom Nixon (footballer, born 2002), English footballer

== See also ==
- Thomas Nixon Carver (1865–1961), American economics professor
