= Robert Nixon =

Robert Nixon may refer to:

- Robert A. Nixon (1900–1948), American politician
- Robert Nixon (politician) (born 1928), retired Canadian politician
- Robert Nixon (comics) (1939–2002), British comics artist
- Robert Nixon (prophet), 15th or 17th century prophet in Cheshire, England
- Robert Samuel Nixon (1909–1998), MP in the Northern Ireland Parliament for North Down
- Robert Nixon (criminal) (1919–1939), American serial killer
- Robert Nixon (filmmaker) (born 1954), American filmmaker
- Bob Nixon (Zimbabwean politician), member of the 1st Parliament of Zimbabwe
