= Thomas Harrison (surveyor) =

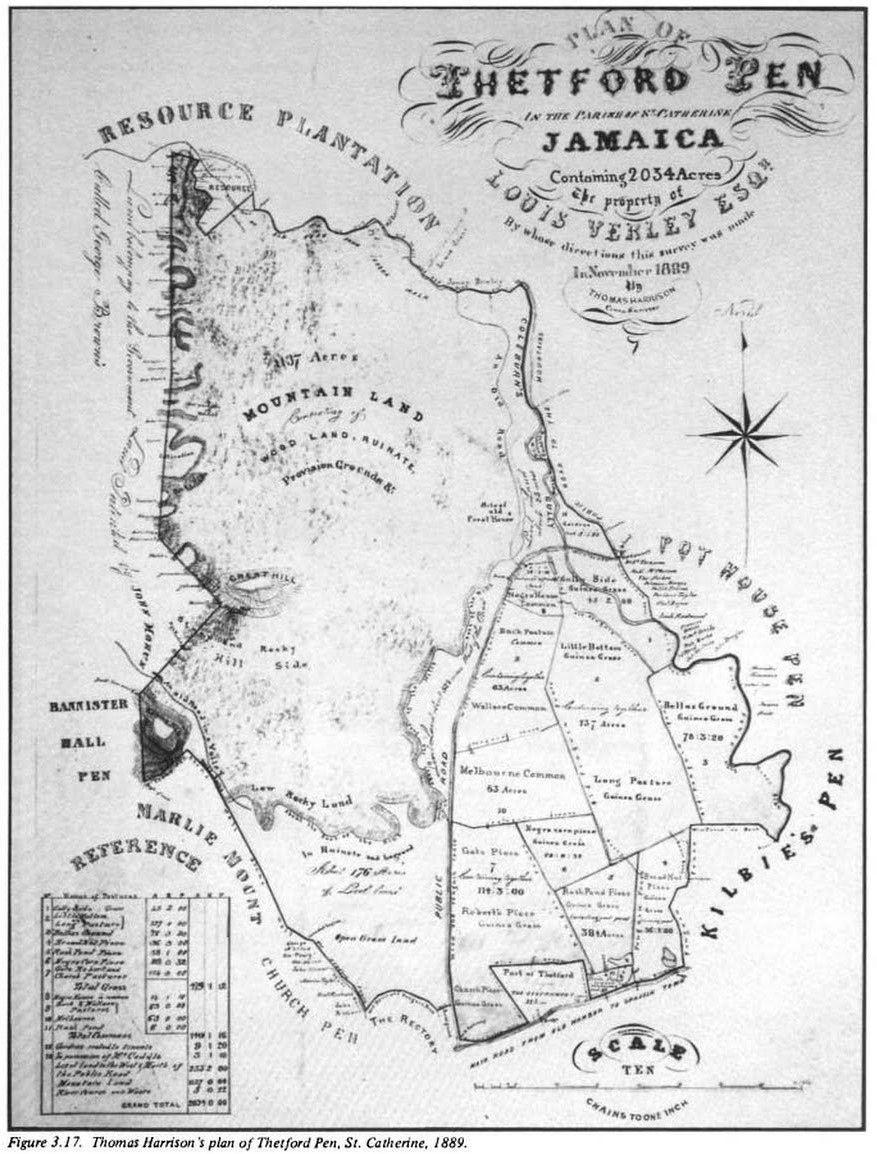
Plan of Thetford Pen in the Parish of St. Catherine &c. Thomas Harrison, 1889.

Thomas Harrison (c. 1823–1894) was the first Government Surveyor of Jamaica. His maps have become an important historical resource for the island.

He was apprenticed to Edward McGeachy.
