= Nixon: Ruin and Recovery, 1973–1990 =

1991 biography by Stephen E. Ambrose

- Author: Stephen E. Ambrose
- Language: English
- Release number: 3
- Subject: Richard Nixon
- Genre: Biography
- Publisher: Simon & Schuster
- Publication date: 1991
- Publication place: United States

Nixon: Ruin and Recovery, 1973–1990 is a 1991 book by American historian Stephen E. Ambrose and the third part of a three-volume biography of President of the United States Richard Nixon. The series began with Nixon: The Education of a Politician, 1913-1962 and continued with Nixon: The Triumph of a Politician, 1962-1972. Ruin and Recovery details Nixon's fall from grace after his resounding 1972 reelection, including the Watergate scandal and his eventual resignation of the Presidency in 1974. It also describes Nixon's life after his presidency and the partial restoration of his reputation.

Although many Nixon aides and associates cooperated with Ambrose, Nixon himself declined to be interviewed. Nixon told an interviewer that he did not read the book after publication either, labelling Ambrose as "just another left-wing historian". Most reviewers, however, have attested to Ambrose's overall fairness.
