= Nixon Lake =

Lake in Wright County, Minnesota, United States

- Location within Minnesota
- Location: Wright County, Minnesota
- Coordinates: 45°21′27″N 94°3′21″W
- Type: lake

Nixon Lake is a lake in Wright County, in the U.S. state of Minnesota.

Nixon Lake bears the name of a local pioneer settler.

There is also a Nixon Lake in Vilas County, Wisconsin.

== See also ==
- List of lakes of Minnesota
