= James Nixon =

James Nixon may refer to:

- James Nixon (rugby league) (born 1985), English born Scottish rugby league player
- James Nixon (painter) (1741–1812), English miniature painter
- James Nixon (American football) (born 1988), American football cornerback
- James Henry Nixon (1802–1857), illustrator and painter
