= Arthur Nickson (musician) =

Australian organist and music teacher

Arthur Ernest Howard Nickson (1 March 1876 – 16 February 1964), commonly referred to as A. E. H. Nickson, was an Australian organist and music teacher.

== History ==
Nickson was born in Collingwood, Victoria, to Jemima Hunter Nickson, née Snowball (died 12 August 1913), and Frederick Thomas Nickson (died 29 April 1930), who married in Perth in 1870. His mother, daughter of a noted centenarian, was closely associated with the Anglican Sunday-school movement, and that of the Church of St Michael, North Carlton, in particular.

He studied organ under Ernest Wood, organist and choir-master at St Paul's Cathedral.

In 1895 he was awarded the Sir W. J. Clarke's Scholarship for Music, the first male instrumentalist so honored. The scholarship entitled the recipient to three years' free tuition at the Royal College of Music in London, a similar benefit to the Elder Overseas Scholarship in South Australia. (Note: The Elder Travelling Scholarship as it was sometimes known, did not include the fare to London, board and lodging during holidays, or a dress suit (needed for stage performances, a necessary part of the course). It has not yet been found whether Sir William Clarke's endowment had the same problems for students of modest means.)

In 1919 the winner of the scholarship was Neil McKie, one of Dickson's students. He later attained the position of organist at Westminster Abbey, London, and as Sir William McKie was responsible for the music at the Coronation of Queen Elizabeth.
In 1939 Noel Nickson, his son, was the successful entrant.

Nickson received high commendations from the college, and was granted a year's extension for his studies, resulting in his admission as ARCM in 1899. During this time he was also admitted ARCO. He extended his studies in London by another two years, during which he was admitted FRCO. He returned to Melbourne aboard the SS Neckar in November 1901. He was given glowing testimonials by Sir Walter Parratt and Sir Hubert Parry.

He resumed organ playing at Holy Trinity Church, on Chapel Street Balaclava, a suburb of Melbourne, then in 1903 transferred to St Peter's Church, East Melbourne, well known for its adherence to the Anglo-Catholic tradition, and Nickson's "spiritual home". He was instrumental in acquiring a new organ for the church and in mid-1911 left for England to personally supervise its construction by the firm of Norman and Beard to Royal College of Organists' standards. He transferred to St John's Church, Toorak in May 1916, succeeding W. G. Price. He returned to St Peter's in 1930.

== Other activities ==
Nickson began taking private students immediately on his return from studies in England, and from 1904 taught at the Melbourne Conservatorium. He served as organist, teacher and choirmaster at the Melbourne Church of England Grammar School from 1906 to 1926 and was music critic for The Age in the same period.

== Family ==
Nickson had a brother Frederick Thomas Nickson and a sister Grace Ethel Nickson, later Reynolds.

On 29 December 1914 Nickson married Beryl Florence Bennie (c. 1891–15 September 1959), a fine soprano. They had two sons and a daughter.

- Arthur Francis Bennie Nickson (24 September 1915 – 8 January 1968)
- Beryl Claire Bennie Nickson (16 April 1917 – 4 May 1997) was engaged to Victor Hugh Parkinson, later married Robert Oliver Bodey (d. 10 August 1989)
- Noel John Bennie Nickson (5 January 1919 – 18 September 2006)
