= David Nixon =

David Nixon may refer to:

- David Nixon (magician) (1919–1978), English magician and television personality
- David Nixon (choreographer) (born 1958), Canadian dance choreographer
- David Nixon (footballer) (born 1988), Scottish footballer
- David Nixon (director), American film director and producer
- David Nixon (American football) (born 1985), American football linebacker
