= Saint David Parish, Jamaica =

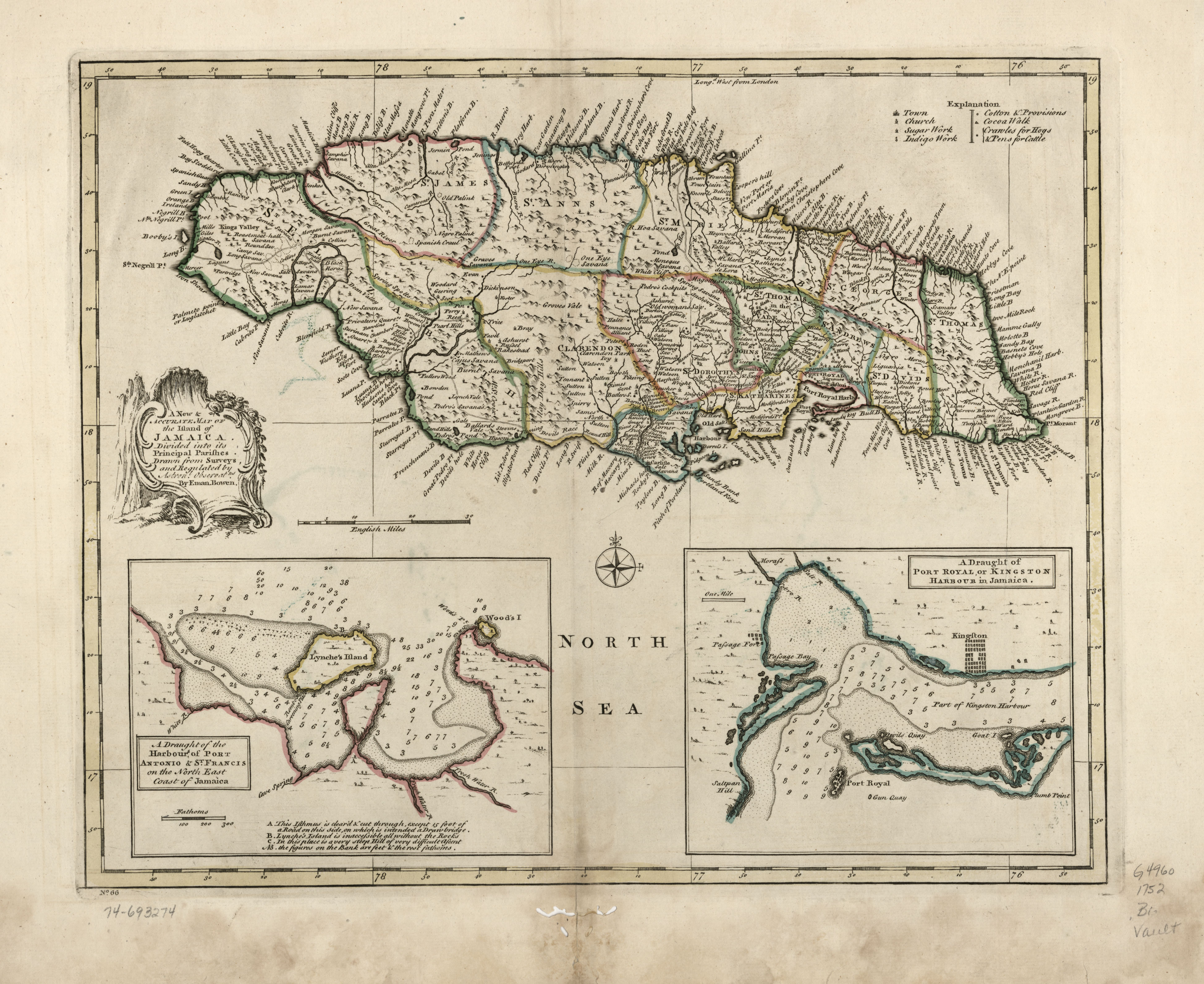
A New & Accurate Map of the Island of Jamaica. Divided into its Principal Parishes. Emanuel Bowen, 1752. (Saint David Parish in the east)

Saint David Parish was one of the historic parishes of Jamaica created following colonisation of the island by the British. It was in the east of the island in Surrey County

Saint David Parish was one of several parishes abolished as part of the administrative reforms introduced following the Morant Bay rebellion. The new Governor, John Peter Grant, arrived in 1866. The colony was losing money and when the arrangements of the existing parishes was looked at, a great disparity in populations and sizes was found. Thus in 1861 St David had a population of 6,452 living in an area of 76.5 square miles, while Saint Elizabeth Parish covered 448 square miles with a population of 37,777. Grant set out to make savings by rationalising the Parishes, reducing their number from 22 to 14. To this end the Jamaican Legislative Council passed A Law to Reduce the Number of Parishes (1867/No.20) under which Saint David Parish was merged with the bulk of Saint Thomas in the East Parish from 1 May 1867 to form Saint Thomas Parish.
