= Richard Nixon (Montana politician) =

American politician (1901–1975)

Member of the Montana Senate

Richard Ivor "Red" Nixon (October 5, 1901 – March 4, 1975) was an American politician from the state of Montana. He served in the Montana State Senate, and in 1961 was that body's majority leader.
