= List of killings by law enforcement officers in pre-reunification Germany =

Listed below are people killed by non-military law enforcement officers in Germany prior to reunification on 3 October 1990, whether or not in the line of duty, irrespective of reason or method. Included, too, are cases where individuals died in police custody due to applied techniques. Inclusion in the list implies neither wrongdoing nor justification on the part of the person killed or the officer involved. The listing simply documents occurrences of deaths and is not complete. It also includes some killings that occurred in the German colonial empire prior to its dissolution in 1920.

== Statistics ==
Year	Number killed by use of firearms (official statistics)	Number killed by any means (counted)	Number of shots fired on persons
1929	at least 46		
1930	at least 29	34	
1931	at least 34		
1952	at least 31 (e.g., Philipp Müller)		
1958	at least 5		
1963	at least 4 (North Rhine-Westphalia and Hesse only)		
1964	at least 2 (NRW and Hesse only)		
1965	at least 6 (NRW and Hesse only)		
1966	at least 6 (Bavaria, Bremen, Hamburg, NRW and Hesse only)		
1967	at least 5 (Benno Ohnesorg, otherwise Bavaria, Bremen, Hamburg, NRW and Hesse only)		
1968	at least 10 (Bavaria, Bremen, Hamburg, NRW and Hesse only)		
1969	at least 6 (Bavaria, Bremen, Hamburg, NRW and Hesse only)		
1970	at least 11 (Bavaria, Bremen, Hamburg, NRW and Hesse only)		
1971	at least 8 (e.g. Petra Schelm, Georg von Rauch)		
1972	at least 4 (e.g. Tommy Weisbecker, Ian McLeod, Richard Epple, Theo Duifhus)		
1973	at least 13 (e.g. Erich Dobhardt)		
1974	10 (e.g. Günter Jendrian)		
1975	15 (e.g. Werner Sauber)		
1976	8		141
1977	17 (e.g. Helmut Schlaudraff)		160
1978	8 (e.g. Willi-Peter Stoll, Michael Knoll)		111
1979	11		104
1980	16 (e.g. Manfred Perder)		111
1981	17		93
1982	11		125
1983	24 (e.g. Jürgen Bergbauer)		53
1984	6		159
1985	10		203
1986	12		169
1987	7		165
1988	9		170
1989	10		161
1990	6 (pre-reunification)		At least 98
Sum	229 minimum (1965 to October 1990 in West Germany)		

Figures before 1978 can not be compared directly to later numbers. A list of police killings was first compiled 1997; owing to a legal 20-year document retention limit, some files may have been destroyed. Additionally, the numbers here do not include suicides.

== Cases ==
=== 1900s ===
1900

Date (YYYY-MM-TT)	Name	Age	Place	State	Summary of events
1900-03-XX	N.N.		Hagenau	Elsaß-Lothringen	A teenage boy who had fled from a juvenile correctional facility was shot by a Prussian gendarme when he attempted to flee across the France-Germany border. French media alleged that both the boy and the officer had passed the boundary marker. The shooting was published amidst a number of other border encounters between German officials and criminal smugglers, poachers and fugitives.

1906

Date (YYYY-MM-TT)	Name	Age	Place	State	Summary of events
1906-03-11/12	N.N.		Windhuk	Groß-Namaland, Deutsch-Südwestafrika	Colonial police caught a trio of cattle thieves slaughtering one of two stolen oxen at a camp near Hohewarte. The officers immediately opened fire, killing a Herero man while the others escaped.

1908

Date (YYYY-MM-TT)	Name	Age	Place	State	Summary of events
1908-09-27/28	N.N.		Rehoboth	Groß-Namaland, Deutsch-Südwestafrika	A police patrol consisting of two German colonial policemen and eight Baster auxiliaries ambushed a group of cattle thieves in the mountains, three armed with rifles. One San man was shot and killed, after which three other men, as well as 16 women and children were arrested.
1908-11-XX	N.N.		Ramansdrift	Klein-Namaland, Deutsch-Südwestafrika	Colonial police sergeant Johannes Becker and native policeman Abraham pursued two armed native men suspected of stealing a goat. One of them was killed with two gunshots.
1908-11-XX	N.N.		Ramansdrift	Klein-Namaland, Deutsch-Südwestafrika	A day after the previous shooting, officers Becker and Abraham encountered the surviving man again, still wielding a rifle. He fled on sight and did not stop after verbal command or warning shots. The man was shot five times, the last of which was fatal.

1909

Date (YYYY-MM-TT)	Name	Age	Place	State	Summary of events
1909-03-16/17	3 killed		Maltahöhe	Groß-Namaland, Deutsch-Südwestafrika	A police patrol led by inspection officer Trenk tracked down a group of San tribesmen wanted for the killing of cattle herder Zarus. Two men were apprehended while three, including the suspected murderer, were shot dead when they fled.

=== 1910s ===
1914

Date (YYYY-MM-TT)	Name	Age	Place	State	Summary of events
1914-02-11	Sefo	17-18	Malie	Upolu, Deutsch-Samoa	Four Samoan fitafita auxiliaries went on a "Cowboys and Indians"-style robbery spree around Apia, after being inspired by an American cowboy movie, targeting Chinese labourers as "Indians". On 8 February, after being admonished by their superintendent for robbing a meeting of Chinese card players, the group went rogue, robbing the home of police commissioner Pusch, stealing 300 rounds of ammunition. The next day, while looking for more Chinese labourers to rob, the outlaws fatally wounded 31-year-old German rancher Otto Treviranus and his assistant Wilhelm Schlitt when they objected to the harassment of their workers. The group were tracked to the hometown of their mothers. where, after a stand-off with police and locals, a shoot-out occurred. 24-year-old civilian volunteer Otto Hellige was fatally shot and officer Motzkus heavily injured before three of the robbers were killed by other fitafita. The remaining robber, Ao, was sentenced to death and hanged on 14 February.
1914-02-11	Fili	17-18	Malie	Upolu, Deutsch-Samoa	
1914-02-11	Faalili	17-18	Malie	Upolu, Deutsch-Samoa	

1919

Date (YYYY-MM-TT)	Name	Age	Place	State	Summary of events
1919-02-20/21	Steinicke, Moritz	15	Gelsenkirchen	Provinz Westfalen	A teenage USPD member was arrested without cause by two Reichwehr soldiers, two police officers, and a civilian. In Erle, a soldier and a police officer fatally shot the boy, reportedly when he tried to flee, common phrasing by government-aligned agencies at the time to excuse extrajudicial political murders. The soldier was found not guilty while the police officer was never charged.
1919-03-10	Jogiches, Leo	51	Berlin	Berlin	Jogiches, a Polish Jewish politician who founded the Social Democracy of the Kingdom of Poland and Lithuania, was arrested at his apartment in Neukölln in early March. He was extrajudicially killed in custody at Justizvollzugsanstalt Moabit via gunshot to the back of the head by two police officers, 19-year-old Ernst Tamschick and 35-year-old Werner Grahn. It's suspected that Tamschick, a right-wing sympathiser with involvement in the Freikorps, had committed the murder as Jogiches was investigating the murders of Communist Party of Germany (KPD) co-founders Karl Liebknecht and Rosa Luxemburg by Guards Cavalry Division following the failed Spartacist Uprising; Jogiches was planning to release the details of the killings and names of the shooters. Tamschick died of natural causes in the 1980s while Grahn was executed by hanging in 1947 at Landsberg Prison for his role in the Mauthausen concentration camp.
1919-03-11	Borchard, Richard		Berlin	Berlin	Police searched the apartment of a man accused of firing a gun from a window. Officers arrested him when they found a Russian-made bullet casing, despite the item being a World War I souvenir from 1914. On 18 March, the man's wife received his body at the morgue. He had been shot in the head, and his new stockings and shoes had been removed. The man had no ties to any political groups, though opposed to the Spartacus Uprising, and was a civilian supporter of the Imperial German Army.
1919-05-04	Kling, Marie		München	Münchner Räterepublik	On 3 May, Weimar Republic police arrested a man because his daughter was carrying ammunition. His other daughter voluntarily joined her father at the police jail in Giesing. She was subsequently criminally charged for carrying a red flag, which an officer interpreted as a possible attack symbol. Both father and daughter were volunteer nurses for the Munich Republic Red Army. A jury exonerated her after convincing witness testimony the same day and she was set for release on 4 May. Without authorisation, police transported the daughter to Stadelheim Prison, where she was "used as a target practice dummy". She was shot in the foot, calf, thigh and finally the head. No one was charged because the case documents were lost.
1919-05-18	Dorrenbach, Heinrich	31	Berlin	Berlin	Dorrenbach, a German military officer who helped organise the Volksmarinedivision and was a prominent Social Democratic Party of Germany politician, was arrested hiding at a supporter's house in early May for his role in the 1918 Christmas crisis and Spartacist uprising. He was extrajudicially killed in custody at Moabit Criminal Court via gunshot to the back of the head by police officer Ernst Tamschick, who claimed that Dorrenbach had attempted to escape.

=== 1920s ===
1920

Date (YYYY-MM-TT)	Name	Age	Place	State	Summary of events
1920-01-13	42 killed		Berlin	Berlin	The Reichstag Bloodbath (German: Blutbad vor dem Reichstag) occurred in front of the Reichstag building in Berlin during negotiations by the Weimar National Assembly on the Works Council Act (German: Betriebsrätegesetz). Sicherheitspolizei shot into a crowd of protesters, killing a minimum of 20 people, but modern estimates place the number of dead at 42. It is regarded as the bloodiest demonstration in modern German history. The event was overshadowed two months later by the Kapp Putsch but remained in the collective memory of Berlin's labour movement and security forces.
1920-12-29	Hoffmann, Paul		Flensburg	Provinz Schleswig-Holstein	On 28 December, a communist was arrested after being implicated by an informant for allegedly planning a coup. The following morning, the prisoner was shot twice in the back while reportedly assaulting an officer and attempting to flee. The unit commander, von Plüskow, was investigated and transferred with no other penalties.

1921

Date (YYYY-MM-TT)	Name	Age	Place	State	Summary of events
1921-03-23	19 killed		Hamburg	Hamburg	March Action: A communist-organized rally consisting of 15,000 to 20,000 unemployed labourers occupied the shipyards of Vulcan and Blohm+Voss at Steinwerder, as protest and to force the employers to hire more workers. Police barricaded and patrolled the streets using armored vehicles and heavy weaponry. At Elbe Tunnel, where 2,000 Vulcan employees had gathered in support of the communists, police fatally shot four workers. Later at Millerntor, police opened fire on a crowd of labourers, killing 15 of them. Returning fire by armed protesters also killed one policeman .
1921-03-24	11 killed		Eisleben	Provinz Sachsen	March Action: Five Schutzpolizei Hundertschaften launched a raid in Helfta, which had been largely occupied by militant workers. Police regained control of the district following several shootouts that left 11 labourers and four police officers dead.
1921-03-26	Müller, Paul		Klostermansfeld	Provinz Sachsen	March Action: The local community leader led a troop of Schupo officers from Düsseldorf into town, where they were fired upon despite the leader previously negotiating a ceasefire. He was arrested in the evening since he was also a KPD member, supposedly for detention at a jail. The following morning, he was found dead by gunshot in a field outside of Leimbach, where no jail was located, with significant blunt head injuries. On 21 April, a court ruled that the man was "probably shot during escape", but later chose to reinvestigate.
1921-03-27	Herzau, Kurt	18	Beesenstedt	Provinz Sachsen	March Action: Police shot and killed a paramedic and a labourer.
1921-03-27	Thielke, Gustav		Beesenstedt	Provinz Sachsen	March Action: Police shot and killed a paramedic and a labourer.
1921-03-27	Pawlack, Walter	18	Bischofrode	Provinz Sachsen	March Action: Police summarily executed eight prisoners. Two of the identified dead were from Helbra.
1921-03-27	Weiner, Stefan		Bischofrode	Provinz Sachsen	March Action: Police summarily executed eight prisoners. Two of the identified dead were from Helbra.
1921-03-27	Dietrich		Bischofrode	Provinz Sachsen	March Action: Police summarily executed eight prisoners. Two of the identified dead were from Helbra.
1921-03-27	N.N.		Bischofrode	Provinz Sachsen	March Action: Police summarily executed eight prisoners. Two of the identified dead were from Helbra.
1921-03-27	N.N.		Bischofrode	Provinz Sachsen	March Action: Police summarily executed eight prisoners. Two of the identified dead were from Helbra.
1921-03-27	N.N.		Bischofrode	Provinz Sachsen	March Action: Police summarily executed eight prisoners. Two of the identified dead were from Helbra.
1921-03-27	N.N.		Bischofrode	Provinz Sachsen	March Action: Police summarily executed eight prisoners. Two of the identified dead were from Helbra.
1921-03-27	N.N.		Bischofrode	Provinz Sachsen	March Action: Police summarily executed eight prisoners. Two of the identified dead were from Helbra.
1921-03-28	Deutsch, Martin		Schraplau	Provinz Sachsen	March Action: Police summarily executed six prisoners in a lime kiln. No reason was given for the killings, although police briefly spread the false rumour that the group had raped a pregnant woman to death as justification.
1921-03-28	Müller		Schraplau	Provinz Sachsen	March Action: Police summarily executed six prisoners in a lime kiln. No reason was given for the killings, although police briefly spread the false rumour that the group had raped a pregnant woman to death as justification.
1921-03-28	Poblentz		Schraplau	Provinz Sachsen	March Action: Police summarily executed six prisoners in a lime kiln. No reason was given for the killings, although police briefly spread the false rumour that the group had raped a pregnant woman to death as justification.
1921-03-28	Trautmann		Schraplau	Provinz Sachsen	March Action: Police summarily executed six prisoners in a lime kiln. No reason was given for the killings, although police briefly spread the false rumour that the group had raped a pregnant woman to death as justification.
1921-03-28	N.N.		Schraplau	Provinz Sachsen	March Action: Police summarily executed six prisoners in a lime kiln. No reason was given for the killings, although police briefly spread the false rumour that the group had raped a pregnant woman to death as justification.
1921-03-28	N.N.		Schraplau	Provinz Sachsen	March Action: Police summarily executed six prisoners in a lime kiln. No reason was given for the killings, although police briefly spread the false rumour that the group had raped a pregnant woman to death as justification.
1921-03-28	Peter		Querfurt	Provinz Sachsen	March Action: Düsseldorf Schupo under police major Bernhard Graf Poninski tortured and killed three prisoners. The second of the dead was a storekeeper for a local communist union, whose shop was looted by the officers.
1921-03-28	Straube		Querfurt	Provinz Sachsen	March Action: Düsseldorf Schupo under police major Bernhard Graf Poninski tortured and killed three prisoners. The second of the dead was a storekeeper for a local communist union, whose shop was looted by the officers.
1921-03-28	N.N.		Querfurt	Provinz Sachsen	March Action: Düsseldorf Schupo under police major Bernhard Graf Poninski tortured and killed three prisoners. The second of the dead was a storekeeper for a local communist union, whose shop was looted by the officers.
1921-03-28	18 killed		Essen	Rheinprovinz	March Action: After a conference between the KPD and the Free Workers' Union of Germany (FAUD) ended, a group of labourers attempted to stage a protest on the Burgplatz. Police opened fire, killing 19 people.
1921-03-29	Lederer, Walter		Leuna	Provinz Sachsen	March Action: 21 Schutzpolizei Hundertschaften, led by police major Graf Poninski, stormed the occupied Leuna works, housing 1,500 communist militants. Officer Alfred Axtmann was killed and several other officers wounded. Around 1,300 militants were arrested of which around 100 were locked in nitrogen silos and tortured at the scene. At least 9 were killed by police by shooting, bludgeoning, or forced gunshot suicide. Modern sources estimate between 31 and 70 militants died in total through police killing or drowning in the nearby Saale. At least ten dead labourers were retrieved from the river and also had gunshot wounds, but it's uncertain if they were killed by police, since other survivors were beaten to death by supporting right-wing civilians on the riverbank.
1921-03-29	Isecke		Leuna	Provinz Sachsen	
1921-03-29	Zillmann		Leuna	Provinz Sachsen	
1921-03-29	N.N.		Leuna	Provinz Sachsen	
1921-03-29	N.N.		Leuna	Provinz Sachsen	
1921-03-29	N.N.		Leuna	Provinz Sachsen	
1921-03-29	N.N.		Leuna	Provinz Sachsen	
1921-03-29	N.N.		Leuna	Provinz Sachsen	
1921-03-29	N.N.		Leuna	Provinz Sachsen	
1921-03-29	Schneidewind		Halle	Provinz Sachsen	March Action: In the evening, Schutzpolizei raided a VKPD radio station, killing the two workers manning it.
1921-03-29	Harzdorf		Halle	Provinz Sachsen	March Action: In the evening, Schutzpolizei raided a VKPD radio station, killing the two workers manning it.
1921-03-29	5 killed		Mannheim	Republik Baden	March Action: During KPD-led protests against police deployment against militant activity, Schutzpolizei opened fire on the crowd, killing five people.
1921-03-29	2 killed		Karlsruhe	Republik Baden	March Action: During KPD-led protests against police deployment against militant activity, Schutzpolizei opened fire on the crowd, killing two people.
1921-03-29	30 killed		Gevelsberg	Provinz Westfalen	March Action: Members of the militant Communist Workers' Party of Germany (KAPD) disarmed a police troop and locked them in a building at the trainyard. The KAPD members stole funds from the office, as well as vehicles to disrupt the train traffic. Backup Schutzpolizei from Barmen and Hagen eventually arrived, killing 30 militants.
1921-03-30	Ludy, Johannes		Leuna	Provinz Sachsen	March Action: Four communists attempted to free prisoners at the Leuna works. The rescue failed and two of them were killed by police.
1921-03-30	Steinbrück, Albert		Leuna	Provinz Sachsen	March Action: Four communists attempted to free prisoners at the Leuna works. The rescue failed and two of them were killed by police.
1921-03-30	8 killed		Bachra	Land Thüringen	March Action: Around 150 workers who managed to escape the Leuna works raid was ambushed by 200 Schutzpolizei officers during a night march. Eight militants were killed while 60 were arrested, 16 of whom suffered heavy injuries.
1921-03-31	Mosenhauer		Schkeuditz	Provinz Sachsen	March Action: The KPD-aligned community leader of Osmünde was arrested. During the drive to Schkeuditz, the officers led the man into a field, beat him, and had an officer from a different troop, Rudolf Böhm, fatally shoot the prisoner in the heart. Böhm was found not guilty on 31 October.
1921-04-01	Sült, Wilhelm	33	Berlin	Berlin	A KPD politician and union leader was arrested on 30 March and held without charge for inciting workers to revolt. While being escorted up a set of stairs at the Alexanderplatz police station, officer Albert Jannicke shot the prisoner in the back. The man was left on the stairs and not attended to for several hours, with several police officers walking by and one shouting for him to die. He died on 2 April at Charité. Jannicke claimed that the prisoner attempted escape, and despite the court acknowledging that it was "highly unbelievable" that he would attempt to escape into the upper floors, as described by the officer, he was not charged.
1921-06-13	Buchholz, Johannes		Berlin	Berlin	A police officer was found dead from a gunshot to the back of the head in the Charlottenburg police barracks. The precinct claimed he had committed suicide to avoid being arrested for defalcation, but no such investigation had been conducted against the officer. It was heavily suspected at the time and later by historians that the officer was either investigating or part of the internal unit faction "Ringmannen", led by Walther Stennes, who used funneled police funds to Baltic German regions to cause military unrest. He was most likely killed for preparing to expose the group's corruption. Officers Erren and Meyer were tried but found not guilty on 2 December of the same year.

1922

Date (YYYY-MM-TT)	Name	Age	Place	State	Summary of events
1922-03-22	Graff, Joseph Félicien	23	Hamborn	Rheinprovinz	Schupo officers Kaws, Engeler, and Schwirrat fatally shot a Belgian police officer on a tram in a case of mistaken identity. The shooting was believed to have been a revenge killing, as on 20 March, German-born Belgian police officer Schmidt had shot and killed Schupo officer Franz Chmielewski outside jurisdiction in the French-Belgian-occupation zone. Schmidt was sentenced to one year imprisonment and a fine, reduced later to six months. The officers had waited for Schmidt to enter the tram, but a different Belgian lieutenant boarded instead. As the shooters had fled, in their place superior officer Reinhardt and colleagues Riebke and Klein were sentenced to death for incitment. Grabert and Tremöwer were given 20 years imprisonment. The shooters turned themselves in on 9 January 1923. In Stettin, Kaws and Engeler were sentenced to death for being the shooters and Schwirrat was given a 20-year prison sentence. They were handed in to Belgian authorities for their sentences, but in November 1925, the officers received a pardon by King Albert I after year-long negotiations and repatriated.
1922-07-17	Kern, Erwin	23	Saaleck	Provinz Sachsen	A member of the ultranationalist terrorist group Organisation Consul and one of the assassins of Foreign Minister Walther Rathenau. Kern and fellow member Hermann Fischer had been hiding out in Saaleck Castle for a day when two police officers were alerted to their presence by travellers who had noticed the light on inside. During the following shootout, Kern was fatally shot, after which Fischer retreated with his compatriot's body and killed himself by gunshot.

1923

Date (YYYY-MM-TT)	Name	Age	Place	State	Summary of events
1923-07-17	Allfarth, Felix	22	München	Bayern	Beer Hall Putsch: Fourteen people were shot by Bavarian police on the Odeonsplatz during the attempted coup led by the Nazi Party in Munich. Four police officers were killed during the fire exchange. Two others (Theodor Casella and Martin Faust) were killed earlier during a shootout with Reichswehr soldiers. Although all 16 dead are commonly remembered as either SA or NSDAP members, one of them, Karl Kuhn, was not a participant in the coup and instead an onlooker who was accidentally shot in the crossfire. Adolf Hitler falsely claimed that Kuhn was a Freikorps Oberland member in Mein Kampf to use his memory as a Blutzeuge for popular support. A relative seeking to clear Kuhn's name in the 1980s researched his history and found that Kuhn was working as a waiter at the time of the coup, having been shot when he stepped outside the café to investigate the noise.
1923-07-17	Bauriedl, Andreas	44	München	Bayern	
1923-07-17	Ehrlich, Wilhelm	29	München	Bayern	
1923-07-17	Hechenberger, Anton	21	München	Bayern	
1923-07-17	Körner, Oskar	48	München	Bayern	
1923-07-17	Laforce, Karl	19	München	Bayern	
1923-07-17	Neubauer, Kurt	24	München	Bayern	
1923-07-17	von Pape, Klaus	19	München	Bayern	
1923-07-17	von der Pfordten, Theodor	50	München	Bayern	
1923-07-17	Rickmers, Johann	42	München	Bayern	
1923-07-17	von Scheubner-Richter, Max Erwin	39	München	Bayern	
1923-07-17	Ritter von Stransky-Griffenfeld, Lorenz	34	München	Bayern	
1923-07-17	Wolf, Wilhelm	25	München	Bayern	
1923-07-17	Kuhn, Karl	26	München	Bayern	

1929

Date (YYYY-MM-TT)	Name	Age	Place	State	Summary of events
1929-03-29	Reh, Kurt			Freistaat Preußen	A drunk Schupo officer shot and killed a labourer. Despite ample evidence and witness testimony, the officer was not indicted.
1929-05-03	33 killed		Berlin	Berlin	Blutmai riots: An unscheduled Labour Day protest was suppressed by baton-wielding officers, after which Berlin Police Chief Karl Zörgiebel deployed 13,000 officers to conduct a police raid in Wedding and Neukölln, predominantly left wing-leaning voting blocks. In the ensuing street riots, police killed 33 people, all of them being civilians without affiliation to the left-wing rioters, of whom 1,300 were arrested. The first killed was 53-year-old plumber Max Gemeinhardt on 1 May, who was shot in the head on his balcony for not closing his apartment window on police orders. In one instance, police opened fire on a crowd without provocation, killing 26-year-old labourer Ernst Mai with a shot in the neck. The last death was 53-year-old journalist Charles Mackay who had been working as a correspondent for The Sunday Express after he was ousted from his homecountry of New Zealand for the attempted murder of D'Arcy Cresswell. Mackay was shot by police who had mistaken him for a rioter after he ignored commands to vacate a street. Nearly all the deceased were shot, many from behind, with one exception, Otto Querner, who was instead run over and crushed to death by an armored vehicle. A total of 10,981 gunshots were fired by police over the course of three days. The incident further increased tensions between the KPD and the SPD, as the chief of police was a member of the SPD.
1929-XX-XX	12 killed				A document signed by state minister Albert Grzesinski in the Landtag of Prussia lists 46 killings related to police.

=== 1930s ===
1930

Date (YYYY-MM-TT)	Name	Age	Place	State	Summary of events
1930-01-01	Kobitsch-Meyer, Herbert	29	Berlin	Berlin	An inmate convicted of serial robbery during the March Action as a member of the Plättner Gruppe in 1925 began showing signs of illness, including muscle atrophy and weight loss. Prison and government officials denied requests to be given a medical checkup for months before being granted an examination, during which the doctor found him "fit to serve his sentence" and did not require treatment. Three weeks later, his condition worsened and was hospitalized on 31 December before dying the next day. He had lost 40 pounds within less than a year.
1930-01-14	Horn, Hans	16	Worms	Rheinhessen Provinz	Darmstadt police opened fire on an unemployment protest, killing a teenage boy via headshot and injuring several more participants.
1930-01-15	Görschler, Johannes		Hartmannsdorf	Provinz Sachsen	During a 5,000 person strike at the Recenia textile factory, five workers were fatally shot by police and twenty more injured. Three died in Chemnitz, one died in Röhrsdorf and another died in Freiberg. 17 more were injured. In 1945, East German authorities renamed the factory VEB Feinwäsche "Bruno Freitag", after one of the deceased.
1930-01-15	Freitag, Bruno		Hartmannsdorf	Provinz Sachsen	During a 5,000 person strike at the Recenia textile factory, five workers were fatally shot by police and twenty more injured. Three died in Chemnitz, one died in Röhrsdorf and another died in Freiberg. 17 more were injured. In 1945, East German authorities renamed the factory VEB Feinwäsche "Bruno Freitag", after one of the deceased.
1930-01-15	Gröger, Walter		Hartmannsdorf	Provinz Sachsen	During a 5,000 person strike at the Recenia textile factory, five workers were fatally shot by police and twenty more injured. Three died in Chemnitz, one died in Röhrsdorf and another died in Freiberg. 17 more were injured. In 1945, East German authorities renamed the factory VEB Feinwäsche "Bruno Freitag", after one of the deceased.
1930-01-15	Hänze, Richard		Hartmannsdorf	Provinz Sachsen	During a 5,000 person strike at the Recenia textile factory, five workers were fatally shot by police and twenty more injured. Three died in Chemnitz, one died in Röhrsdorf and another died in Freiberg. 17 more were injured. In 1945, East German authorities renamed the factory VEB Feinwäsche "Bruno Freitag", after one of the deceased.
1930-01-15	Thomas, Kurt		Hartmannsdorf	Provinz Sachsen	During a 5,000 person strike at the Recenia textile factory, five workers were fatally shot by police and twenty more injured. Three died in Chemnitz, one died in Röhrsdorf and another died in Freiberg. 17 more were injured. In 1945, East German authorities renamed the factory VEB Feinwäsche "Bruno Freitag", after one of the deceased.
1930-01-17	Winterstein, Karl		Lübeck	Freie und Hansestadt Lübeck	Several labourers were embroiled in an argument on the sidewalk. A Schupo officer shot into the crowd from across the street, striking one man in the liver, causing his death at a hospital a few hours later.
1930-01-30	Sell, Walter	16	Hamburg	Hamburg	A teenage labourer was shot in the forehead during a police raid in the narrow alleys of Gängeviertel in Neustadt. He died during transport to a hospital.
1930-03-06	Frischmann, Erich	26	Berlin	Berlin	During a protest for the International Day of the Unemployed, a labourer was shot in the chest and arm by a police officer with dum-dum rounds. He died 26 March.
1930-03-06	Krakowsky, Georg	19	Berlin	Berlin	During a protest for the International Day of the Unemployed, a former member of the Spartacus League who led the Lichtenberg youth wing of the Roter Frontkämpferbund paramilitary was shot in the back by police while in Berlin-Mitte. He died the same day. The shooting occurred around 90 minutes after the previous one.
1930-03-06	Peschke, Franz	25	Berlin	Berlin	A police officer was shooting at protesters when a ricochet struck an uninvolved passerby in the abdomen. He died 18 March.
1930-03-06	Fröhder, Karl		Ammendorf	Provinz Sachsen	During a protest for the International Day of the Unemployed, a labourer was killed with a shot in the heart by police.
1930-03-06	Orlik, Paul		Döllnitz	Provinz Sachsen	An uninvolved passerby was shot in the head by police.
1930-03-13	Kißling, Paul		Dresden	Provinz Sachsen	A citizen journalist was taking photos of a KPD-organized hunger march across Saxony when police interrupted the proceedings with armored vehicles and beat the participants with batons. As several officers were blocking off the street from pedestrians, the journalist tried to get a better look by stepping through them while showing off his press pass. He was then beaten with batons by the officers and died 20 March in a hospital from blunt trauma.
1930-04-03	Brillert		Danzig	Freie Stadt Danzig	A farm worker was one of around fifty labourers participating in a protest march from Stutthof to Danzig. On a country road, police surrounded the protesters and fired several shots at them to break up the march, aided by local land owner Hans Wiebe who rode his horse into the group. The farm worker was chased by a Schupo officer and drowned in the Weichsel, being prevented from returning to land by gunfire. Seven other protesters were injured by gunshots or blunt trauma.
1930-04-20	Dyba, Otto		Berlin	Berlin	A private car was trying to drive through a street at Jüdenstraße, which was blocked by a labour protest. Schupo officer Galle made efforts to disperse the crowd by firing his sidearm. A teenage labourer was killed and three others injured. Galle was stabbed to death with several flagpoles by a mob of protesters who witnessed the shooting.
1930-04-21	Zahnke, Gustav	22	Leipzig	Provinz Sachsen	During the fifth annual Reich Youth Day, two protesters were chased by a police officer, who turned off the safety on his gun during the pursuit. One of the men ran for a basement entrance, when the revolver was aimed at him, at which point the officer caught up to the fleeing protester. The officer hit him with a baton and dragged him back up the stairs, shooting the man twice in the back. He died on 25 April.
1930-05-27	Kliche, Walter	22	Ketzin an der Havel	Provinz Brandenburg	Two brothers and their friend, all members of the Roter Frontkämpferbund, were greeting other members with the identifying phrase "Rot Front!" on the street when a police officer ran towards the group. The officer fired several shots in the air before shooting one of the brothers in the throat before putting the three men under arrest. The wounded man died shortly after at a hospital.
1930-06-16	Lillienthal, Ernst		Hamburg	Hamburg	A middle-aged dock worker was shot by police while protesting at the Port of Hamburg. He died the same day at a nearby hospital despite emergency surgery.
1930-06-23	Gozdzikowski, Lothar		Berlin	Berlin	Schupo officer Oskar Kärgel confronted a man illegally bathing in the Hohenzollernkanal in Saatwinkel. During the verbal argument, Kärgel fired several shots in the air before shooting the man, who was dressed only in swimming trunks and had kept his arms crossed. He died at a hospital. Police arrested communist community leader Willi Koska, who had been one of many witnesses to the shooting and asked Kärgel what gave him the authority to aim his gun at an unarmed man, and charged him with obstruction.
1930-08-23	Haubner, Paul		Bunzlau	Provinz Niederschlesien	Police were guarding a Nazi Party meeting from leftist counter-protesters. Officers eventually opened fire, killing three members of the crowd, two labourers and a business owner. None of the officers were charged, but eight protesters were sentenced to a minimum of one year imprisonment.
1930-08-23	Schirmer, Reinhold		Bunzlau	Provinz Niederschlesien	Police were guarding a Nazi Party meeting from leftist counter-protesters. Officers eventually opened fire, killing three members of the crowd, two labourers and a business owner. None of the officers were charged, but eight protesters were sentenced to a minimum of one year imprisonment.
1930-08-23	Teubner, Oskar		Bunzlau	Provinz Niederschlesien	Police were guarding a Nazi Party meeting from leftist counter-protesters. Officers eventually opened fire, killing three members of the crowd, two labourers and a business owner. None of the officers were charged, but eight protesters were sentenced to a minimum of one year imprisonment.
1930-09-13	Hanert		Berlin	Berlin	Police and Nazis were occupying the Karl-Liebknecht-Haus, which was the headquarters of the KPD. Officers broke up the interior and fired several shots at a group of protesters outside, killing one.
1930-09-19	Fischer	16	Kottbus	Provinz Brandenburg	Police officer Heinrich shot and killed a teenage labourer under unclear circumstances.
1930-11-09	Mühlig, Julius		Hilden	Rheinprovinz	During a protest march held in response to a Nazi attack on local communists, police arrested several members of the crowd. A contributor to the Rote Hilfe newspaper was forced against a wall and killed with several gunshots to the chest. Another protester was shot in the head behind the right ear and killed instantly. Several protesters and uninvolved passerby were also injured.
1930-11-09	Schwab, Wilhelm	60	Hilden	Rheinprovinz	During a protest march held in response to a Nazi attack on local communists, police arrested several members of the crowd. A contributor to the Rote Hilfe newspaper was forced against a wall and killed with several gunshots to the chest. Another protester was shot in the head behind the right ear and killed instantly. Several protesters and uninvolved passerby were also injured.
1930-12-03	Tauber, Alfred	21	Zwenkau	Provinz Sachsen	A hunger march came under gunfire by police. Chief of Police Heinrich Fleißner had previously issued a protest ban, but the communist organisers circumvented it by holding the march just ourside the city. Three people were killed and nine were heavily injured by two salvos from police carabiniers.
1930-12-03	Cymborowski, Bruno	27	Leipzig	Provinz Sachsen	A hunger march came under gunfire by police. Chief of Police Heinrich Fleißner had previously issued a protest ban, but the communist organisers circumvented it by holding the march just ourside the city. Three people were killed and nine were heavily injured by two salvos from police carabiniers.
1930-12-03	Kießling, Arno	26	Leipzig	Provinz Sachsen	A hunger march came under gunfire by police. Chief of Police Heinrich Fleißner had previously issued a protest ban, but the communist organisers circumvented it by holding the march just ourside the city. Three people were killed and nine were heavily injured by two salvos from police carabiniers.
1930-12-09	Engel, Wilhelm	19	Hamburg	Hamburg	A forbidden protest march in St. Pauli was broken up by police, who beat protesters with batons and fired several gunshots into the crowd. One man was killed and six were heavily injured.
1930-12-19	Altmann, Helmut		Berlin	Berlin	Two police officers argued with several communist activists putting up political posters in an eastern borough. Without warning, they opened fire with their sidearms, striking one in the abdomen. The man died of his injuries on 21 December.
1930-12-28	Padowski		Salzwedel	Provinz Sachsen	A KPD member was arrested by police while returning from an informal party meeting. He was booked on suspicion of riding a bicycle drunk, despite witnesses stating that he did not appear intoxicated. The man was locked in a cell and found dead the next day. Police officially logged his cause of death as a heart attack, but an independent medical examination found that the man's body bore signs of blunt force trauma.

1931

Date (YYYY-MM-TT)	Name	Age	Place	State	Summary of events
1931-01-02	Tannert		Husum	Provinz Schleswig-Holstein	Two labourers were loudly arguing on a street, due to which police officer Holm put one of them under arrest. When the man refused to leave with Holm, the officer fatally shot him.
1931-01-02	Hackstein, Jakob		Moers	Rheinprovinz	Police shot at labourers during a strike by miners protesting a planned mass layoff. A stray bullet killed an uninvolved platelayer working on the nearby railroad.
1931-01-03	Steffensdorfer, Wilhelm	17	Lintfort	Provinz Westfalen	During a remembrance march for the Ruhrkampf, police opened fire, killing a teenage worker with a gunshot to the head. He had reportedly been shot accidentally when a crowd was attempting to free two communist prisoners from police custody.
1931-01-03	Schramowski, Josef	22	Mengede	Provinz Westfalen	A remembrance rally for the Ruhrkampf held by KPD-affiliated labourers was disrupted by a Nazi counter-protest. The Nazis eventually opened fire on the crowd, during which police also shot at the workers. A labourer with the Catholic youth order was fatally struck in the crossfire.
1931-01-06	Wilms, Peter		Solingen	Rheinprovinz	Police broke up a strike by miners, during which a labourer was killed by an officer via blunt head trauma.
1931-01-13	Hoffmann, Hugo	28	Erfurt	Land Thüringen	Police were dispatched to a metal good factory, where workers on strike were clashing with scabs. Officers immediately opened fire upon arrival, killing a worker with a shot in the abdomen and injuring two more.
1931-01-26	Benthin, Alfons	18	Geesthacht	Provinz Schleswig-Holstein	Two labourers from Hamburg attended a Communist counter-protest of roughly a hundred people to a Nazi rally. The Nazis alerted police, who opened fire on the counter-protesters, killing the two Hamburg workers and injuring at least three.
1931-01-26	Geick, Bernhard	23	Geesthacht	Provinz Schleswig-Holstein	Two labourers from Hamburg attended a Communist counter-protest of roughly a hundred people to a Nazi rally. The Nazis alerted police, who opened fire on the counter-protesters, killing the two Hamburg workers and injuring at least three.
1931-02-03	Kolb, Georg		Nürnberg	Bayern	A group of labourers were singing loudly on their way home from a pub. A state police officer attempted to arrest them and when one of the men resisted, he was shot in the heart.
1931-02-12	Weil	20	Kaiserslautern	Saargebiet	A carpenter was arrested by German police and extrajudicially killed on a military training grounds.
1931-02-12	Müller	31	Mainz	Volksstaat Hessen	During a skirmish between left-wing and Nazi protesters, a communist was shot and killed by police.
1931-02-25	Hertel, Hans	24	Leipzig	Provinz Sachsen	Police opened fire on a social democrat and communist unemployment protest, killing four and injuring several others. Some newspapers list five deaths, but all only name four victims.
1931-02-25	Hödlich, Hermann	24	Leipzig	Provinz Sachsen	Police opened fire on a social democrat and communist unemployment protest, killing four and injuring several others. Some newspapers list five deaths, but all only name four victims.
1931-02-25	Ludwig, Otto	25	Leipzig	Provinz Sachsen	Police opened fire on a social democrat and communist unemployment protest, killing four and injuring several others. Some newspapers list five deaths, but all only name four victims.
1931-02-25	Burkert, Walter	37	Leipzig	Provinz Sachsen	Police opened fire on a social democrat and communist unemployment protest, killing four and injuring several others. Some newspapers list five deaths, but all only name four victims.
1931-03-18	Marzi, Valentin	37	Düsseldorf	Rheinprovinz	Communist protesters used stones and firearms against police, injuring four officers. Police indiscriminately opened fire on the crowd, injuring seven. Of the three heavily wounded protesters, two died.
1931-03-18	Hansen, Hubert	22	Düsseldorf	Rheinprovinz	Communist protesters used stones and firearms against police, injuring four officers. Police indiscriminately opened fire on the crowd, injuring seven. Of the three heavily wounded protesters, two died.
1931-03-21	Riis, Krey	19	Barmbeck	Hamburg	During protests following the funeral of KPD politician Ernst Henning, who was killed by SA members, a Roter Frontkämpferbund unit of the banned KPD attacked police with knives, during which several officers were injured and one KPD member from Flensburg was killed by a police gunshot.
1931-04-06	Funke, Willi		Berlin	Berlin	A man was shot by Schupo in the hallway of his apartment building in Neukölln.
1931-04-19	Funke, Anton	20	Hamm	Rheinprovinz	Three protesters, one from Beckum, one from Dortmund and one from Hamm's Braam-Ostvennmar district, were shot by police.
1931-04-19	Menne, Hugo	25	Hamm	Rheinprovinz	Three protesters, one from Beckum, one from Dortmund and one from Hamm's Braam-Ostvennmar district, were shot by police.
1931-04-19	Machallek, Ernst	55	Hamm	Rheinprovinz	Three protesters, one from Beckum, one from Dortmund and one from Hamm's Braam-Ostvennmar district, were shot by police.
1931-04-26	Freyburger, Karl	26	Deutsch Eylau	Provinz Westpreußen	Three members of the NSDAP were causing a disturbance while wandering a street in an intoxicated state. A police patrol stopped them and attempted to perform arrests when one of them, a cattleman with the rank of SA-Sturmbannführer, physically assaulted an officer, who then pulled out his sidearm. The officer was then hit in the arm by another Nazi, causing an accidental discharge that struck the initial attacker in the head. The officer in question pleaded self-defense in his trial and was acquitted. Several streets were named after the deceased during the Third Reich as a martyr, under the false narrative that he died while "fighting for a better Germany".
1931-05-17	Reidel		Heidelberg	Republik Baden	Police shot a man in his apartment under unclear circumstances.
1931-05-25	Deglau, Otto		Essen	Rheinprovinz	A communist militant threw rocks at police and was fatally shot during his escape.
1931-06-10	Mengel, Heinrich	18	Kassel	Provinz Hessen-Nassau	During a communist protest, a public square was being forcefully cleared after a police officer, surnamed Kuhlmann, was killed by blunt trauma from thrown bottles and stones. A protester was subsequently shot and died two days later. Police attributed the gunshots to friendly fire from the communists and no investigation was held.
1931-06-11	Nau, Anton	90	Kassel	Provinz Hessen-Nassau	During the ongoing unrest, a cobbler was killed by a stray shot fired by police into his apartment.
1931-06-11	Dominikowski, Franz		Kassel	Provinz Hessen-Nassau	Shortly before midnight, police shot three protesters during a forced clearing. One man died of his injuries the following morning.
1931-06-11	Lange, Emil	26	Lauenburg	Herzogtum Sachsen-Lauenburg	A metal worker was shot by police during a sanctioned protest.
1931-06-12	Marienberg, Albert	41	Lüneburg	Provinz Hannover	A KPD member was shot by police while walking home. He died of his injuries on 10 July.
1931-06-15	Bögel, Georg	28	Hamburg	Hamburg	A baker was shot in the chest by police.
1931-06-22	Krause, Kurt	23	Magdeburg	Provinz Sachsen	A protester was shot in the abdomen by police and died of his injuries in a hospital.
1931-06-30	Sievert, August	20	Peine	Provinz Hannover	A shootout between Nazi and communist paramilitary groups was broken up by Hannover police officers, during which a gunshot injured a SA-Mann, a pastry chef by trade, who died on 2 July. A street was partially named after him in 1938.
1931-07-14	Nietz, Richard		Berlin	Berlin	In Neukölln, a KPD member was shot while fleeing the site of an ambush on NSDAP members.
1931-07-15	Weinhold, Willi		Schwerte	Rheinprovinz	
1931-07-15	Hoffmann, Jakob		Dortmund	Rheinprovinz	In Kirchhörde, Landjäger gendarme Marschall shot and killed a man for stealing flowers. The shot was fired at a distance of 5 meters.
1931-07-17	Schmitz, Karl		Krefeld	Rheinprovinz	Two communist militants were cornered by a policeman after one of the two men had fired a gunshot in public. The officer was shot in the knee and killed the attacker with returning fire. The date is alternatively given as 1 August, with the deceased's name as Karl Schmidt.
1931-07-21	Klein, Albert	32	Dortmund	Rheinprovinz	A plainclothed Schupo officer fatally shot a man.
1931-07-22	Dehnke, Willy	27	Dortmund	Rheinprovinz	A plainclothed Schupo officer fatally shot a man from Danzig.
1931-07-29	Kukies, Hermann		Berlin	Berlin	A man was beaten to death by officers at a police station in Charlottenburg-Wilmersdorf.
1931-08-01	Toffel, Rudi		Berlin	Berlin	A protester was shot in the heart by police during an anti-war demonstration in Lichtenberg.
1931-08-03	Kilian, Paul		Gräben bei Striegau	Provinz Schlesien	A pair of brothers, both members of the SPD, started two drunken fights due to their opposition to the 1931 Prussian Landtag dissolution referendum. They first verbally argued with pub owner Aloe, a member of the Nazi Party, before starting another argument with Rohner and his wife, both members of the KPD. The brothers were beating up the couple when an off-duty Landjäger gendarme intervened. The attackers repeatedly struck and kicked the officer's police dog, took his rubber baton, and attempted to strangle him. The gendarme issued several warnings during the attack before using his sidearm to kill the brothers in self-defense with one shot each.
1931-08-03	Kilian, Heinrich		Gräben bei Striegau	Provinz Schlesien	
1931-08-08	Auge, Fritz	19	Berlin	Berlin	A plumber was shot by police while walking home past the Karl-Liebrecht-Haus. His death is commonly cited as the one that convinced KPD leadership to order the assassination of high-ranking police officer Paul Anlauf in the Bülowplatz murders.
1931-08-09	Bolle, Gerhard	16	Berlin	Berlin	Immediately after the Bülowplatz murders, injured policeman August Willig and several of his colleagues opened fire on a crowd of supposed "ruffians". 22 people were injured including two children. A teenage boy died shortly the same day from a gunshot to the head while a businessman died of his injuries on 13 August.
1931-08-09	Stern, Max	53	Berlin	Berlin	Immediately after the Bülowplatz murders, injured policeman August Willig and several of his colleagues opened fire on a crowd of supposed "ruffians". 22 people were injured including two children. A teenage boy died shortly the same day from a gunshot to the head while a businessman died of his injuries on 13 August.
1931-10-30	Borowski, Bruno		Hamburg	Hamburg	Around 30 to 50 Nazis passed through a predominantly communist quarter to pass around flyers advertising their party. A communist counter-protest formed and assaulted the opposing group. During the brawl, police arrived and attempted to break up the fight, but were kept at bay with stone throws. Officers then opened fire on the communists, killing two.
1931-10-30	Schwarz, Heinrich		Hamburg	Hamburg	Around 30 to 50 Nazis passed through a predominantly communist quarter to pass around flyers advertising their party. A communist counter-protest formed and assaulted the opposing group. During the brawl, police arrived and attempted to break up the fight, but were kept at bay with stone throws. Officers then opened fire on the communists, killing two.
1931-XX-XX	Oster				Police officer Bienert was involved in a shootout with communist militants when he accidentally shot and killed a passerby. A court found the officer not guilty.

1932

Date (YYYY-MM-TT)	Name	Age	Place	State	Summary of events
1932-02-21	Büder, Hans	28	Berlin	Berlin	As a locale in Reinickendorf frequented by labourers was being forcefully vacated by a police force, a patron was mortally wounded by a police officer and died days later on 25 February.
1932-05-06/20	Kaufmann, Oskar		Waltershausen	Land Thüringen	A middle-aged labourer, who was a volunteer in various socialist organisations, was shot in the head by police during a protest against welfare reduction. 9 others, including two children, were injured by police gunfire. Images of the man's bloodied body were widely published in newspapers to rally against the government. A street was named in his honor after World War II.
1932-07-XX	Nicolai, Walter		Wittenberg	Provinz Sachsen	During a labor protest organised by the union cartel of Wittenberg, a group of counter-protesters disrupted the march by snatching flagpoles from child participants. When the protesters engaged the counter-protesters in a physical struggle, police fired several gunshots into the crowd, fatally shooting a member of Arbeiter-Turn- und Sportbund in the head and injuring several others. A woman separately died of a heart attack.
1932-07-15	Eckert, Margarethe		Langenselbold	Provinz Hessen-Nassau	An unemployment march was held to protest welfare cuts during the emergency decree by Franz von Papen, as well as the alleged beating of KPD Reichstag member Otto Brenzel. Schutzpolizei opened fire on the crowd, killing two protesters and wounding a third who died in the following four days.
1932-07-15	Halbschmidt, Käthe	24	Langenselbold	Provinz Hessen-Nassau	An unemployment march was held to protest welfare cuts during the emergency decree by Franz von Papen, as well as the alleged beating of KPD Reichstag member Otto Brenzel. Schutzpolizei opened fire on the crowd, killing two protesters and wounding a third who died in the following four days.
1932-07-15	Leisner, Fritz		Langenselbold	Provinz Hessen-Nassau	An unemployment march was held to protest welfare cuts during the emergency decree by Franz von Papen, as well as the alleged beating of KPD Reichstag member Otto Brenzel. Schutzpolizei opened fire on the crowd, killing two protesters and wounding a third who died in the following four days.
1932-07-15	Kanitz, Erich	32	Weißwasser	Provinz Sachsen	During a rally of the Communist International group Workers International Relief, a shootout between workers and police ensued, during which the chairman of the WIR was shot and killed.
1932-07-17	Fühler, Emil	72	Altona	Provinz Schleswig-Holstein	Altona Bloody Sunday: A recruitment march by the Sturmabteilung led to violent clashes between SA members, communist counter-protesters and police. A total of 18 people died, 16 of whom were killed by police fire from a sniper battalion positioned on rooftops; the remaining two were SA-Männer shot by communist militants. The deaths consisted of fifteen uninvolved residents and one visitor, the wife of a participant in the march. The event was used by Franz von Papen and Paul von Hindenburg to initiate the Preußenschlag. Police used forged evidence and coerced testimony to shift blame for the civilian casualties on fifteen communist activists, four of whom were indicted. Following the Machtergreifung in 1933, Bruno Tesch, Walter Möller, Karl Wolff, and August Lütgens were given a show trial and subsequently executed by beheading. One of the dead was Anna Raeschke, mother of boxer Ferdinand Raeschke. She was killed via headshot while in her kitchen with only a piece of bread in her mouth while making dinner for her then-12-year-old son. The only non-resident civilian death was Helene Winkler, wife of one of the participants in the Nazi march, who along with the killed Nazis Heinrich Koch and Peter Büddig, was declared a Blutzeuge by the Nazi government.
1932-07-17	Fydrich, Emil	29	Altona	Provinz Schleswig-Holstein	
1932-07-17	Gehrke, Walter	21	Altona	Provinz Schleswig-Holstein	
1932-07-17	Gess, Erwin	23	Altona	Provinz Schleswig-Holstein	
1932-07-17	Hagen, Adolf	35	Altona	Provinz Schleswig-Holstein	
1932-07-17	Jackisch, Walter	46	Altona	Provinz Schleswig-Holstein	
1932-07-17	Kalinowski, Franz	48	Altona	Provinz Schleswig-Holstein	
1932-07-17	Kerpl, Emil	57	Altona	Provinz Schleswig-Holstein	
1932-07-17	Miersch, Willi	25	Altona	Provinz Schleswig-Holstein	
1932-07-17	Ragotzki, Hermann	48	Altona	Provinz Schleswig-Holstein	
1932-07-17	Raeschke, Anna	33	Altona	Provinz Schleswig-Holstein	
1932-07-17	Rasch, Karl	28	Altona	Provinz Schleswig-Holstein	
1932-07-17	Schmitz, Hans	79	Altona	Provinz Schleswig-Holstein	
1932-07-17	Sommer, Erna	19	Altona	Provinz Schleswig-Holstein	
1932-07-17	Würz, Emma	33	Altona	Provinz Schleswig-Holstein	
1932-07-17	Winkler, Helene	44	Altona	Provinz Schleswig-Holstein	
1932-07-31	Schrön, Friedrich	19	Essen	Rheinprovinz	A business student and SA-Mann was fatally shot by police during a confrontation between Nazi and communist paramilitaries.
1932-07-20	Krull, Karl	26	Stralsund	Provinz Pommern	A SPD member was killed during a police raid on a KPD protest tent city.
1932-02-04	Staroch, Nikolaus	32	Stettin	Provinz Pommern	An Austrian national from Garsten attempted to ambush a courier of the Reichsbank, but was chased off by a policeman and several bystanders. During the pursuit, the robber fired several gunshots, heavily injuring three uninvolved passersby, before failing to carjack a vehicle occupied by two women. During the subsequent firefight, one officer was injured before the robber was hit by numerous shots from police. He died at a hospital the same day. A cyclist was also injured when a special anti-robbery unit accidentally ran him over while en route to the scene.
1932-10-23	Barm, Helmut	18	Bochum	Provinz Westfalen	Following a skirmish with police, a SA-Mann was shot by a 25-year-old Schutzpolizei officer, surnamed Buschenhofen, in Langendreer while on his way to the group barracks. He died of his wounds the next day. Buschenhofen was sentenced to 20 months imprisonment for the shooting. As with other police killings, the Nazi Party claimed that the officer was a Marxist and had targeted the deceased for his political beliefs. Several streets in NRW were named after the deceased as well as an airplane of the Luftwaffe.
1932-11-04	4 killed		Berlin	Berlin	1932 Berlin transport strike: During a labour strike in Schöneberg by employees of the BVG, four people were killed and another two injured by police sent to break up the protest after it was declared illegal. The dead consisted of three protesters and one uninvolved woman. 46-year-old Kurt Reppich, a customs officer and SA-Scharführer who was shot in the head, was later extensively featured in Nazi propaganda and had his role exaggerated as a main organizer. He was memorialised by the later Nazi government, with a customs boat, a border camp and a school being among the things named after him.
1932-11-27	Elbrächter, Eduard	41	Bielefeld	Provinz Westfalen	A SA-Truppführer got into an argument with a police recruit, surnamed Lutterklas, in a pub in Brackwede. Lutterklas left the pub and returned shortly after with his sidearm, shooting the other man twice in the abdomen, leading to his death the next day. A SA unit was named after the deceased in 1936.
1932-12-07	Bich, Ernst	26	Barmen	Rheinprovinz	Police were called to due to reports of a quarrel involving a large group in a street. One of the participants, a waiter and SA-Scharführer, attempted to escape and fired a revolver shot at the pursuing officers, who subsequently shot him in the stomach, from which the man died two days later in a hospital. The Nazi government would later instead claim that he died from an attack by social democrats and named a street in Neuss-Reuschenberg after him in December 1937.
1932-XX-XX	N.N.		Schweidnitz	Provinz Niederschlesien	A member of Reichsbanner Schwarz-Rot-Gold was shot by police.

1933

Date (YYYY-MM-TT)	Name	Age	Place	State	Summary of events
1933-03-21	Wenzel, Wilhelm		Essen	Gau Essen	A Hilfspolizei officer was attacked by a crowd of left-wing labourers while at a restaurant in Borbeck. The officer fired one shot into the group, striking a man in the chest, who died of the wound at a hospital.
1933-04-27	Funk, Albert	38	Recklinghausen	Gau Westfalen-Süd	A prominent KPD politician was arrested on 16 April without cause following Adolf Hitler's rise to power. He was tortured at a Gestapo station and died after sustaining fatal injuries during a fall from a third story window. A court found in 1949 that Funk was either pushed or committed suicide due to the intensity of the injuries inflicted during his detainment. The Gestapo officer in charge of his interrogation was found guilty in 47 cases of assault as an officer and received 12 years imprisonment.
1933-04-30	Hackstein, Karl		Grevenbroich	Gau Düsseldorf	A KPD functionary who had gone into hiding to avoid political repression was arrested by police and SA-Hilfspolizei. The officers claimed that the functionary attempted to flee shortly after, which they killed him with several times gunshots to the head and back.
1933-06-21/22	May, Arthur	31	Bourheim	Gau Köln-Aachen	A journalist and KPD member critical of the Nazi Party was targeted by the Gestapo after they liquidated his newspaper. He was arrested on 16 June and tortured in police custody at the Yellow Barracks. The journalist was handed to SS troops, working as Hilfspolizei, who intended to interrogate him further in Jülich. The officers in charge of his transport shot and killed him en route, claiming the prisoner had attempted escape.
1933-07-30	N.N.		Iserlohn	Gau Westfalen-Süd	A KPD member was fatally shot by Hilfspolizei while fleeing from the scene of a raid in Obergüne.
1933-09-02	Handschuch, Hugo	23	München	Gau München-Oberbayern	On 23 August, a member of the SA was uncovered as a KPD infiltrator. The man was tortured at the Brown House before being transferred to Dachau concentration camp where he died over a week later. His official cause of death was a heart attack, but an independent medical examination determined that he died by head trauma causing brain damage.
1933-09-29	Axen, Rolf	21	Dresden	Gau Sachsen	The underground leader of the East Saxony branch of the KPD was arrested by police and died during torture at the police station. He was the older brother of resistance fighter Hermann Axen.
1933-11-11	Konrad		Flensburg	Gau Schleswig-Holstein	A worker handing out political flyers was shot while fleeing.
1933-12-12	von der Reith, Diedrich	33	Hamburg	Gau Hamburg	A KPD member was arrested by Gestapo on 30 September and transferred to Fuhlsbüttel concentration camp on 9 October. He died after lengthy torture by Gestapo officers, who tried to cover up the death as a suicide by hanging. The medical examiner, however, refused to issue a death certificate after viewing the maimed body.

1934

Date (YYYY-MM-TT)	Name	Age	Place	State	Summary of events
1934-02-01	Schehr, John	37	Berlin	Gau Berlin	Four prominent members of the KPD were transported from Columbia concentration camp by Gestapo and summarily executed on Wannsee Island. Nazi authorities framed the transport as a transfer to another facility and the fatal shootings as resulting from an escape attempt by the prisoners, when in reality, the killings were retaliatory for the murder of the recently identified Gestapo informant Alfred Kattner by his former KPD constituents. It was later determined by SED that Bruno Sattler, who later served as chief of Gestapo in Nazi-occupied Serbia during World War II, was either one of the shooters or the commanding officer in the murders. Sattler was kidnapped by Stasi in 1947, his death being faked while he was sentenced to hard labour for life before being executed in 1972.
1934-02-01	Schönhaar, Eugen	35	Berlin	Gau Berlin	
1934-02-01	Schwarz, Rudolf	29	Berlin	Gau Berlin	
1934-02-01	Steinfurth, Erich	37	Berlin	Gau Berlin	
1934-11-27	Naujack, Karl Leopold	47	Hamburg	Gau Hamburg	A painter was arrested by Sicherheitspolizei and beaten severely with a baton during custody at Untersuchungshaftanstalt Hamburg. He died at the nursing station from blunt trauma to the head, spine, glutes, and thighs.
1934-11-27	Springer, Wilhelm	40	Hamburg	Gau Hamburg	A KPD member active in German resistance to Nazism was arrested by Gestapo at his workplace on 8 November. He died after prolonged tortured by Gestapo officers at Fuhlsbüttel concentration camp.

=== 1940s ===
1940

Date (YYYY-MM-TT)	Name	Age	Place	State	Summary of events
1940-12-28	Kley, Else	26	Berlin	Gau Berlin	32-year-old police officer Paul Ottmann attempted to rape a nurse, whom he inadvertently killed during the struggle. Ottmann was sentenced to death for her murder and executed by guillotine on 24 October 1941.

1942

Date (YYYY-MM-TT)	Name	Age	Place	State	Summary of events
1942-07-13	c. 1,500 killed		Józefów	Generalgouvernement	Order Police battalions: Reserve Police Battalion 101, consisting of roughly 500 Ordnungspolizei officers of Hamburg Police, were recruited by Wilhelm Trapp to participate in Operation Reinhardt to aid in the "resettlement" of Poles and mass murder of Jews. As part of this, the unit was tasked with collecting the 1,800 Jewish residents of the town, transport approximately 300 of the able-bodied Jewish men to use as forced labourers while summarily executing the remaining 1,500 women, children, elderly and disabled by gunshot. The latter was offered voluntarily with the assurance of no punitive action in case of refusal. Only a minority declined to participate in the killings, some being returned to Germany without punishment as promised when requested, while the majority of officers agreed to partake. From July 1942 to 3 November 1943 (Aktion Erntedankfest), the battalion would participate in the murder of around 83,000 people throughout Poland, being entirely responsible for the direct killing of 44,500 in the towns of Łomazy and Parczew and the Majdanek, Poniatowa and Trawniki concentration camps, as well as aiding Hiwi units in the shooting of circa 10,000 of the total.

1944

Date (YYYY-MM-TT)	Name	Age	Place	State	Summary of events
1944-03-19	50 killed		Sagan	Gau Niederschlesien	Stalag Luft III murders: During the escape of 76 Allied servicemen from the Stalag Luft III prisoner-of-war camp, 73 escapees were recaptured, of whom 50 were summarily executed by Gestapo on direct order of Adolf Hitler.
1944-09-22	Lindemann, Fritz	50	Berlin	Gau Berlin	A German Army general and co-conspirator in the failed 20 July plot. Gestapo went to arrest Lindemann at a hide-out in Westend and shot him in the leg and stomach when he tried to escape by jumping through a window, dying at a hospital later on.

1945

Date (YYYY-MM-TT)	Name	Age	Place	State	Summary of events
1945-03-12	36 killed		Essen	Gau Essen	Montagsloch: Gestapo and Essen Kripo officers summarily executed at least 35 forced labourers from the Soviet Union in Grugapark. A possible 36th individual, whose body was not found, may have also been executed at the spot. All remain unidentified.
1945-03-21	33 killed		Wuppertal	Gau Düsseldorf	Burgholz massacre: Twelve to fifteen Gestapo officers and ten Wuppertal Kripo officers summarily executed 30 Soviet forced labourers in Burgholz forest. They were all shot in the neck and buried in a mass grave in Küllenhahn. The victims, 24 men and six women, were involved in covert partisan activity and accused of participating in an ambush on a supply train that killed a train worker. During the group's capture the same day, three men, two Russians and one Ukrainian, were fatally shot. Only one body was ever identified, that being Ukrainian teacher Helena Matrosowa. A month later, one of the shooters, Peter Schäfer, a Schutzpolizei first lieutenant, was also executed at the site on the orders of SS and police leader Karl Gutenberger for making "dissenting statements". In 1948, 14 of the shooters and three commanding officers were indicted by a British military court in Hamburg. At least two of the accused committed suicide before conviction. Five officers ended up being sentenced to death and the rest received varying prison terms, but all were pardoned in 1952.
1945-03-24	Forman, William H.		Bensheim	Gau Kurhessen	Two U.S. Army paratroopers were taken captive and summarily executed by Gestapo. The two shooters, Franz Karl Stattmann and Michael Raaf, as well as two commanding officers who gave the order, Richard Fritz Girke and Heinz Hellenbroich, were sentenced to death and hanged at Landsberg Prison in 1948.
1945-03-24	McDonald, Robert T.		Bensheim	Gau Kurhessen	Two U.S. Army paratroopers were taken captive and summarily executed by Gestapo. The two shooters, Franz Karl Stattmann and Michael Raaf, as well as two commanding officers who gave the order, Richard Fritz Girke and Heinz Hellenbroich, were sentenced to death and hanged at Landsberg Prison in 1948.
1945-03-24	Maraldo, Gretel	21	Bensheim	Gau Kurhessen	Due to approaching Allied forces, Gestapo planned the summary execution of the 20 remaining prisoners at Bensheim jail. Four German men from Groß-Rohrheim, including a SPD politician, were released for unknown reasons while the other rest were forced to march to Edelmannsgrund at Kirchberg. On the way, two prisoners, Soviet officer Alexander Romanow and German resistance member Gretel Maraldo, were shot while attempting to flee. Maraldo was killed while Romanow was able to escape injured after attempting to drag Maraldo to safety. The killed victims included three German Jews, including a Christian convert, a deserter, a KPD member, two French soldiers, a Dutch resistance member, and three unidentified Ostarbeiter. There was one survivor, 34-year old Johann Goral, a Polish labourer who had only been grazed in the head, played dead, and crawled out of the ditch as the shooters executed the other prisoners.
1945-03-24	Bertram, Rosa	46	Bensheim	Gau Kurhessen	
1945-03-24	Salomon, Erich	55	Bensheim	Gau Kurhessen	
1945-03-24	Bechstein, Lina	50	Bensheim	Gau Kurhessen	
1945-03-24	Hangen, Walter	24	Bensheim	Gau Kurhessen	
1945-03-24	Gramlich, Jakob	50	Bensheim	Gau Kurhessen	
1945-03-24	Dumas, Eugène		Bensheim	Gau Kurhessen	
1945-03-24	Delauney, Lothaire		Bensheim	Gau Kurhessen	
1945-03-24	Roolker, Frederik	38-39	Bensheim	Gau Kurhessen	
1945-03-24	N.N.		Bensheim	Gau Kurhessen	
1945-03-24	N.N.		Bensheim	Gau Kurhessen	
1945-03-24	N.N.		Bensheim	Gau Kurhessen	
1945-03-26	34 killed		Hildesheim	Gau Ost-Hannover	Endphasenverbrechen: Following extensive Allied bombing on 22 March, forced labourers were accused of looting food from destroyed stores. Gestapo raided several supposed hide-outs to no result on 25 March, after which the lead officer Heinrich Huck had four prisoners sent in from a Gestapo facility. After personally killing the sole German prisoner upon arrival, Huck had the three others publicly hanged in the market square, at behest of the town mayor Georg Schrader. The same day, at least 30 labourers, most Italian, were sent by upper command with additional food supplies, but finding the goods to be insufficient and of subpar quality, the labourers were also accused of looting and hanged in a public ceremony.
1945-03-27	Hähnel, Albert	41	Chemnitz	Gau Sachsen	Endphasenverbrechen: Gestapo summarily executed seven anti-fascist prisoners who had escaped temporary holding at Kaßbau prison on 5 March after Allied bombing damaged the jail and caused a fire. The victims, six KPD members and one SPD member, were shot in Hutholz forest near Neukirchen.
1945-03-27	Reinel, Willy	48	Chemnitz	Gau Sachsen	Endphasenverbrechen: Gestapo summarily executed seven anti-fascist prisoners who had escaped temporary holding at Kaßbau prison on 5 March after Allied bombing damaged the jail and caused a fire. The victims, six KPD members and one SPD member, were shot in Hutholz forest near Neukirchen.
1945-03-27	Pech, Alfons	50	Chemnitz	Gau Sachsen	Endphasenverbrechen: Gestapo summarily executed seven anti-fascist prisoners who had escaped temporary holding at Kaßbau prison on 5 March after Allied bombing damaged the jail and caused a fire. The victims, six KPD members and one SPD member, were shot in Hutholz forest near Neukirchen.
1945-03-27	Klippel, Walter	58	Chemnitz	Gau Sachsen	Endphasenverbrechen: Gestapo summarily executed seven anti-fascist prisoners who had escaped temporary holding at Kaßbau prison on 5 March after Allied bombing damaged the jail and caused a fire. The victims, six KPD members and one SPD member, were shot in Hutholz forest near Neukirchen.
1945-03-27	Krusche, Kurt	42	Chemnitz	Gau Sachsen	Endphasenverbrechen: Gestapo summarily executed seven anti-fascist prisoners who had escaped temporary holding at Kaßbau prison on 5 March after Allied bombing damaged the jail and caused a fire. The victims, six KPD members and one SPD member, were shot in Hutholz forest near Neukirchen.
1945-03-27	Brand, Max	62	Chemnitz	Gau Sachsen	Endphasenverbrechen: Gestapo summarily executed seven anti-fascist prisoners who had escaped temporary holding at Kaßbau prison on 5 March after Allied bombing damaged the jail and caused a fire. The victims, six KPD members and one SPD member, were shot in Hutholz forest near Neukirchen.
1945-03-27	Junghans, Albert	41	Chemnitz	Gau Sachsen	Endphasenverbrechen: Gestapo summarily executed seven anti-fascist prisoners who had escaped temporary holding at Kaßbau prison on 5 March after Allied bombing damaged the jail and caused a fire. The victims, six KPD members and one SPD member, were shot in Hutholz forest near Neukirchen.
1945-03-30	12 killed		Kassel	Gau Kurhessen	Endphasenverbrechen: Gestapo summarily executed twelve prisoners, including a Wehrmacht deserter, from Justizvollzugsanstalt Kassel I in Wehlheiden cemetery. Eight of the victims were identified.
1945-03-31	79 killed		Kassel	Gau Kurhessen	Endphasenverbrechen: A Gestapo troop led by Franz Marmon summarily executed 79 forced labourers belonging to a railway construction crew at Kassel-Wilhelmshöhe station. The labourers had been abandoned by their guards and were caught looting food supplies from a train cart after several starving German civilians had broken it open and invited the workers to partake, as Allied troops were expected to liberate the city within days. An unknown person reported the looting to Gestapo, after which the labourers were put under arrest, searched and questioned by an interpreter, who was poorly trained, which likely caused miscommunications. The labourers were divided into groups of eight which were then brought into the railyard and executed via gunshots to the head. All the victims were male, aged 20 to 39, and nearly all were Italian, most from Northern Italy, while one unidentified victim was Russian.
1945-04-05	162 killed		Weimar	Gau Thüringen	Endphaseverbrechen: Following the liberation of nearby Buchenwald concentration camp a day earlier, eleven Gestapo officers summarily executed 149 inmates of Weimar prison, consisting of 142 men and seven women, in Webicht forest by the command of senior government councilor Hans Helmut Wolff and buried their bodies in explosion craters. The officers were then ordered to pull back to Böhmen in occupied Czechoslovakia, on their way killing 13 more people, described as "military and civilian individuals, escaped labourers, and prisoners". After the war, only 43 victims were identified by name.
1945-04-06	11 killed		Düsseldorf	Gau Düsseldorf	Endphasenverbrechen: Gestapo officers summarily executed eleven forced labourers, ten men and one woman, all from the Soviet Union and the Netherlands, in Kalkum forest. Only six victims were identified after the war. Police officer Victor Harnischfeger was determined to have been the leading officer during the killings. Harnischfeger was found not guilty of war crimes by a British military tribunal in Hamburg in 1947, but sentenced to death the next year for a different crime, for participating in the murder of Allied civilian personnel and personally killing two forced labourers. He was pardoned in 1952 and maintained his position as a high-ranking police official until his death in the 1980s.
1945-04-11	9 killed		Hemer	Gau Westfalen-Süd	Endphasenverbrechen: Gestapo officers who had fled their post in Dortmund on government orders due to the Ruhr pocket found nine prisoners in an abandoned Gestapo jail outpost on 10 April. The prisoners, eight Slavs and one Frenchman, were summarily executed the next night.
1945-04-12	12 killed		Hagen	Gau Westfalen-Süd	Endphasenverbrechen: Gestapo summarily executed twelve people from various prisons in Hagen in Donnerkuhle quarry. Of the victims, eight Germans and four Slav forced labourers, only the Germans could be identified, being six civilians from Altena, Düsseldorf, Wermelskirchen und Wuppertal, such as 45-year-old Bothe Braune, as well as two "Wehrmacht deserters", really conscientious objecters, such as 20-year-old Eduard Dunker.
1945-04-13	71 killed		Langenfeld	Gau Westmark	Wenzelnbergschlucht massacre: Due to Allied approach, Karl Gutenberger and Walter Model ordered the execution of several political prisoners from regional facilities through over two dozen officers from Gestapo and Kripo of the Solingen and Wuppertal police departments. 60 were from Justizvollzugsanstalt Remscheid, four from JVA Wuppertal-Bendahl, three from Ronsdorf jailhouse while three were unidentified and of unknown origin. The majority of the identified victims were Germans, while three were Soviet and one was Polish. Director of JVA Remscheid Karl Engelhardt had been able to negotiate the initial demand of 600 inmates to 90, finally only delivering 55 by redirecting 35 to a forced labour division. An additional five detainees were added to JVA Remscheid numbers after being delivered by Wuppertal police the day of the killings, though a sixth had managed to escape on the way. Engelhardt had also misrepresented regular criminal offenders as political prisoners.
1945-04-14	8 killed		Neumünster	Gau Schleswig-Holstein	SS and Gestapo were escorting inmates of Justizvollzugsanstalt Fuhlsbüttel in Hamburg to Arbeitserziehungslager Nordmark in Kiel on a 100 km death march, during which Gestapo officers shot at least eight prisoners. Most were shot because they were too slow from exhaustion, while one, 46-year-old Richard Hartmann, a former Gestapo officer who was denounced just weeks earlier for openly objecting to the organisation's torture and secretly treating prisoners well, was killed for "animating others to escape". Hartmann was shot in the neck in Wittorf, after which the same officer killed resistance fighter turned Nazi informer Maurice Sachs on the same spot.

1946

Date (YYYY-MM-TT)	Name	Age	Place	State	Summary of events
1946-03-29	Danziger, Szmuel Abbe	36	Stuttgart	Württemberg-Baden	A troop of 220 German police officers launched a raid for black market goods and counterfeit rations stamps on a displaced persons camp in Stuttgart-West, housing, among others, around 1800 Jewish refugees. Confiscated goods were primarily items such as cigarettes and candy, which had been handed out by the Red Cross via the UNRRA. During the search, a camp guard was injured by a gunshot from police, leading a group of refugees to hurl empty cans and pieces of wood at the officers, with some American servicemen coming to the refugees' aid until German police stated they were conducting a raid. Police opened fire on the crowd from a distance of less than 3 meters, injuring five and killing a Polish Jew, who was a survivor of Auschwitz-Birkenau and did forced labour under the Nazi administration. He had returned from France after locating his wife and child at the camp a day earlier. Arrival of American military vehicles ended up breaking up the assault, but no investigation was ever performed.

1947

Date (YYYY-MM-TT)	Name	Age	Place	State	Summary of events
1947-XX-XX	9 killed		München	Bayern	Throughout the year, nine people were fatally shot during police operations, mostly involving black market trade. Six police officers were also killed the same year.

1948

Date (YYYY-MM-TT)	Name	Age	Place	State	Summary of events
1948-09-09	Scheunemann, Wolfgang	15	Berlin	Berlin	A student leader of a youth wing branch of the Social Democratic Party of Germany. During the Berlin Blockade, Volkspolizei had been instructed to keep pedestrians away from the border to other Allied-occupation zones when they opened fire on a crowd in Unter den Linden boulevard attempting to push past them, injuring 12. Scheunemann was hit in the stomach by a stray shot while seeking cover.

1949

Date (YYYY-MM-TT)	Name	Age	Place	State	Summary of events
1949-01-23	Wolf, Kurt Erwin	45	East Berlin	Berlin	During the Berlin Blockade, which heavily restricted trade by the Soviet occupation sector to the other three, a truck was shot at by border police in Prenzlauer Berg after failing to respond to a signal to stop, leading to a trucker in the passenger seat being killed by three shots to the head. The company was shipping firewood into West Berlin without a permit and the driver, who was arrested upon his return to East Berlin, had ignored the officers' command to avoid the scheme being uncovered.
1949-02-17	Ryll, Helmut	40	East Berlin	Berlin	Two Volkspolizei officers stopped a car carrying two people on Oberbaum Bridge because he was driving towards Kreuzberg in West Berlin. The officers entered the vehicle and not realizing the driver, a resident of West Berlin, was drunk, they ordered him to drive back towards East Berlin. When he did not turn around and ignored further commands by the officers, one of them fired two fatal shots at the driver. The car crashed just past the border and West German authorities arrested one of the officers while the other managed to flee back into East Berlin. As they were unable to prove that the arrested VP officer was the shooter, the West German police did not charge him and allowed him to return.
1949-02-28	N.N.		Edertal	Hessen	A Soviet soldier chased two German women into British-occupied zone, apparently after the women took a briefcase from the Soviet zone. A German police officer intervened, after which the soldier fired a single gunshot at the officer, missing the target. The officer shot and fatally wounded the soldier with returning fire.
1949-05-23	Neumann, Bernhard	15	East Berlin	Berlin	During clashes between Volkspolizei and protesters at Zoo train station, an officer shot a teenager from Charlottenburg in the head from around seven meters distance.
1949-10-18	Albrecht, Kurt	32	Frankfurt am Main	Hessen	A couple was being harassed near Frankfurter Hauptbahnhof by a drunk off-duty police officer, 25-year-old Walter Schneider, who pressed the pair for their Kennkarten. Taxi drivers from the nearby depot joined to separate the officer, who suddenly pulled out a gun and hit several people with it. Another cabby had the gun aimed at his face and pushed the officer's arm aside as he pulled the trigger, the shot instead fatally striking another taxi driver in the chest. American MPs arrested the officer, who was charged with manslaughter.
1949-12-08	Zimmermann, Kurt	36	Großensee	Land Thüringen	Two border police officers spotted a man walking towards the Hessian border. When the man quickened his pace after a verbal command and warning shot, the lower-ranked of the two officers fired a shot into the man's back. It was found that the deceased, who had accepted a job offer in West Germany, had previously smuggled his wife and daughter over the border and was attempting to join them without paying a smuggler. The officer responsible, then-21-year-old Emil Günter K. later stated that he had no killing intentions and was aiming for the legs; K. claimed his resignation from the service in 1950 was motivated by his guilty conscience. In May 1997, he was sentenced to 15 months probation and a fine of 1,200 DM.

=== 1950s ===
1950

Date (YYYY-MM-TT)	Name	Age	Place	State	Summary of events
1950-03-24	Meyer, Hermann	40	Drewitz	Land Brandenburg	A farmer and his companion transporting a slaughtered calf were ordered to stop by East German border police because they suspected, due to the proximity to the border, that they were trying to smuggle the meat into West Germany to sell at a higher profit. Both men fled and were pursued on foot by officers. The companion stopped after four warning shots were fired into the air, while the farmer ignored them and a further three warning shots before the officer chasing him shot him three times in the back.
1950-06-09	Fertig, Oskar Johannes	45	Hohengandern	Land Thüringen	Four border policemen spotted a man from Friedrichroda walking towards the Hessian border into West Germany. The man did not respond to whistling and a warning shot, after which he was shot in the back and bled out seconds later. Post-reunification investigation assume that the man, who lacked an interzone passport, had wanted to bypass border security to visit his mother in Wilhelmshaven. The four officers involved were not named in reports and could not be identified after reunification.
1950-06-18	Wulff, Ernst	63	Schildow	Land Brandenburg	A cattle truck attempted to pass by an East German checkpoint with the lights off in order to illegally sell the cattle in West Germany. A border police unit noticed this and pursued the truck in a requisitioned taxi. Several verbal warnings were issued before shots were fired at the vehicle as a warning to halt, one of the shots fatally striking the passenger of the truck in the head. The truck eventually became stuck on a dirt road and the driver was arrested.
1950-07-25	Kirsch, Paul	23	Neustadt an der Donau	Bayern	During a police operation involving a group of Roma youths outside of a pub, a Czechoslovak Rom man from Oloví was shot after grabbing an officer's rifle. Two other men were given 3 and 5-month prison sentences for assault. Accounts differ on the incident that led to police intervention. Official records state that the pub owner had called police about a brawl in front of the establishment, that the attackers had been drunk and that the deceased had chambered a round and aimed at an officer. The deceased's grandniece, interviewed in 2020, claimed that the group included teens who had played bowling on a street in front of the pub and asked the deceased to help set the pins up. A disagreement ensued between the teens, which the pub owner observed, misinterpreted as becoming physical, and called police for. When the deceased tried to leave due to not being involved, he was stopped by an officer, leading to a scuffle between them during which the deceased got a hold of the gun and was shot by another officer, Johann A., in response. The other Roma participants subsequently attacked officers with sticks and stones, later receiving up to five months of jail for drunkenness.
1950-08-29	Blumberger, Horst	20	East Berlin	Berlin	Two brothers-in-law from Lichtenrade in West Berlin unknowingly trespassed into East Berlin territory to try out what they believed to be an air rifle, but after firing it once, they found that it was a loaded .22 sports rifle. After firing another shot, nearby Volkspolizei called out to them and attempted to arrest the pair. Both men fled and as they climbed a fence to the West German side, the younger man was shot twice in the back and bled out shortly after crossing over. The surviving man contacted West German police, and upon arriving at the scene, they found that the body had been turned on his back, presumably by the East German officers who stepped over the border to check whether the deceased was injured or dead.
1950-09-03	Vogt, Erwin	30	Wehnde	Land Thüringen	
1950-10-13	Fräßdorf, Gerd	23	Kleinmachnow	Land Brandenburg	An office worker from East German Coswig got lost while driving in East Berlin after carpooling some business associates and passed a checkpoint on a road that was often used by people who wanted to cross into West Berlin without being searched. as he did not stop, border police signalled him and subsequently fired two warning shots, both to no response, after which the worker was shot and killed by an aimed shot to the head. He presumably did not hear the officers' commands or the gunshots because of his loud engine.
1950-10-28	Walter, Anneliese	30	Wasserleben	Bezirk Erfurt	Two border police officers had arrested nine undocumented bordercrossers when they noticed the footprints of five other people, belonging to a group of locals that illegally went shopping for groceries in West German Vienenburg. As the group had been alerted to the officers' presence by a previously fired warning shot, all were running back towards the border. The officers fired twice on the group, striking two women. One officer left to call an ambulance while another provided first aid, leaving the remaining twelve bordercrossers free to flee. After one of the women died at a hospital the same day, the superior of the two officers, Manfred S., was investigated for manslaughter, but not indicted. After reunification, S. reinvestigated in 1993, and claimed that the fatal shot he fired was meant as a warning shot. The other officer, Franz M., was not tracked down.

1951

Date (YYYY-MM-TT)	Name	Age	Place	State	Summary of events
1951-03-12	Heyduck, Albert	50	Schöneiche	Land Brandenburg	A cyclist was shot in the back of the head by a border policeman who mistook him for a metal smuggler, as he was carrying several wrapped packages on his bike. He did not follow commands to stop and ignored a warning shot, presumably because he was hard of hearing, before the officer fired an aimed shot. The officer was identified after German reunification and claimed in a 1997 interview, contrary to initial reporting, that the aimed shot was directed at the mudguard, but he accidentally hit the cyclist due to having little practical experience with firearms. He was not charged because authorities were unable to prove intent to kill.
1951-04-30	Heinicke, Walter	48	Potsdam	Land Brandenburg	Three farmers were travelling through the Babelsberg area by bicycle to trade grain for goods, which was illegal in the GDR. They were spotted by four Volkspolizei officers, who ordered them to stop for a search, but the group instead accelerated to flee. One officer then fired a warning shot at the group, which struck one of the farmers in the head who died at a hospital. The other two men were able to escape to West Berlin. The officer who fired the killing shots was identified as Werner W. through contemporary reports after reunification, but he denied the charge and claimed one of his three colleagues, who were left unnamed, had instead opened fire. He was not charged because there was reasonable doubt for his claim.
1951-07-14	Pokrzywinski, Arthur	45	Schönefeld	Land Brandenburg	A suspected smuggler was able to escape custody shortly after arrest. Two officers pursued the man as he was heading towards West Berlin, but as one of them caught up, a scuffle occurred. Because the officer believed the smuggler was about to grab his gun, he fired a shot that killed the suspect.
1951-07-29	Zelsmann, Egon	20	Mendhausen	Land Thüringen	A border police troop attempted to arrest a man who stepped over the border from Bavaria. When he ran, an officer fired three shots in his direction, the third fatally hitting him from a distance of 400 meters. It's suspected that the man wanted to visit his wife, who was due to give birth in Crimmitschau, without a passport. The shooter was identified as Hans R., who claimed he fired with intent to disable and aimed for the legs. He was not charged because no premeditation could be proven.
1951-08-14	Dunkel, Martin	36	Schönefeld	Land Brandenburg	A farmer was arrested on suspicion of smuggling grain to West Berlin, but escaped as he was being escorted to a police station on foot. He ignored several warning shots before an officer fatally shot him from behind. Although reports gave the name of the shooter, Willi S., neither he or the others involved could not be tracked down following reunification, due to which the investigation was shut down.
1951-08-28	Stütz, Rudolf	30	East Berlin	Berlin	Shortly before the end of his shift, a West German police officer was shot in the stomach and thigh during a shootout with two border police officers and two Soviet soldiers at the Lichterfelde-Steglitz checkpoint and died a few days later on 2 September. There are conflicting accounts of the events. GDR records stated that the officer had crossed the border and shot at the guards, who returned fire. The officer claimed before his death that he had accompanied a woman who had asked for an escort to the checkpoint, where East German soldiers and police officers had tried to pull him over the turnpike into East Germany while shooting at him, to which he returned fire before being let go. Fellow colleagues testified that the officer had been drinking that night, with a suspect in the shooting, a former border officer questioned in 1993, saying that he and the deceased were drinking buddies, but that he had to turn him away several times before the same night when he came over to chat. The border officer claimed he was sleeping in the checkpoint at the time and not involved in the shooting. It remains unknown whether the West German officer stepped over the border or not.

1952

Date (YYYY-MM-TT)	Name	Age	Place	State	Summary of events
1952-04-26	Gerbholz, Heinrich	41	Großziehten	Land Brandenburg	A farmer was supposed to be arrested on suspicion of smuggling, as he was known to associate with the border police and traded with them, also taking them out to West Berlin, both against their regulations. The farmer attempted to flee and was shot in the stomach, apparently by a warning shot. The officers involved were transferred and after reunification, although their names were known, they could not be tracked down, thus the investigation was halted
1952-05-11	Müller, Philipp	21	Essen	Nordrhein-Westfalen	During a forbidden protest against West Germany's rearmament organised by leftist and pacifist groups, police opened fire on the crowd, killing a member of the NRW Free German Youth, as well as injuring another two protesters. Police defended their actions, stating that they had been pelted with stones, later also alleging that officers believed that gunshots were being fired at them, with no evidence for the latter. Despite appeals for an investigative committee into the shooting by the Communist Party of Germany, the court of Dortmund deemed the use of deadly force as self-defense.
1952-06-02	Fickelschee, Gerhard	20	Klein Glienicke	Bezirk Potsdam	A commuter refused to show his papers at a checkpoint into West Berlin, where he worked, and tried to escape border police. After a warning shot was fired, the officers fatally shot him from behind.

1953

Date (YYYY-MM-TT)	Name	Age	Place	State	Summary of events
1953-02-19	Fraunhofer, Ludwig	24	East Berlin	Berlin	Two men from West Berlin travelled to East Berlin to go on a drinking binge, as alcohol was cheaper there. They later entered a checkpoint in Treptow to return, but one of the men could not state his reason for entering and was also unable to provide documents besides a POW release certificate; the man, originally from Rauheck, had eloped with his girlfriend from East German Zeitz a month earlier and only recently applied for new ID papers to travel back to Bavaria. He subsequently ran past the checkpoint to the West German side, chased by a Volkspolizei officer, who ordered him to stop and fired two warning shots before shooting the man in the back. He was declared dead at a police hospital. The officers involved were praised by their superiors, with the shooter receiving a salary bonus and extra vacation days. The shooter was identified after reunification and sentenced to one year imprisonment for manslaughter in 1996.
1953-02-21	Grubenstein, Willy	48	East Berlin	Berlin	Two trucks approaching a Friedrichshain checkpoint into West Berlin were signalled to stop for a search, but instead slowed down slightly before accelerating again. Volkspolizei fired at both vehicles, injuring the female passenger of the first truck while killing the driver of the second. It was revealed that the trucks contained the belongings of a couple from Thuringia and that the deceased man was a gift shop owner who had agreed to help the couple escape East Germany. Despite attempts to find the shooter, the investigation was halted due to a lack of leads.
1953-06-17	Schmidt, Gerhard	26	Halle	Bezirk Halle	During the East German uprising of June 1953, an agrarian doctorate student was accidentally fatally shot in the lung from a ricocheting bullet fired by police, who were trying to placate a crowd of protesters at Roter Ochse prison. SED officials used his death in propaganda, claiming that he had been killed by "fascist provocateurs" when he refused to participate in rioting. A total of 50 people were killed in total, excluding 5 executions headed by Soviet authorities, 33 of whom, including Schmidt, were killed by either Volkspolizei or Soviet troops, although only Schmidt could be definitively proven as a victim to police fire.
1953-06-23	Röhling, Wolfgang	15	East Berlin	Berlin	A group of teenage boys were trying to gain access to the Berlin–Spandau Ship Canal for bathing, but were denied by the two guarding Volkspolizei officers, due to orders to temporarily block any possible way into West Berlin in the aftermath of the East German uprising of June 1953. Due to this, the teenagers began throwing stones from a distance and shouting insults at the officers. A troop of Kasernierte Volkspolizei from a neighbouring post saw this and threatened the group, most of whom took cover behind a stone wall, safe for one, who continued to stand by the riverside. A KVP officer then shot the remaining boy in the head, before another shot to the back of the head killed him as he tried to leave. A total of 21 shots were fired. The shooter was never identified.
1953-08-18	Schulz, Theodor	51	East Berlin	Berlin	A man who was wanted for participating in protests against the SED was shot twice in the head by three KVP officers in Wedding. There are conflicting reports about the preceding events, with GDR records stating that he had assaulted officers with a briefcase after being asked to provide ID, while West Berlin police stated that he ran away from a search while trying to cross into West Berlin with several others.
1953-12-18	Prey, Richard	45	East Berlin	Berlin	A man from West Berlin ran away from customs control at a checkpoint in Berlin-Mitte; he had bought cheaper groceries in East Berlin and was trying to bring them back over the border, which constituted as smuggling by East German authorities. After failing to respond to verbal commands and a warning shot, a Volkspolizei officer shot the man twice in the lower torso. He died the same night at a hospital despite emergency surgery. After reunification, the shooter, Alfred F., could not be tracked down and the investigation was halted.
1953-12-24	Scheugenpflug, Karl	73	München	Bayern	Munich Communal Police officer Vogt was driving a police van when he struck an elderly pedestrian walking to Midnight Mass with his wife and step-son in Sendling. Vogt, who was on patrol, claimed that he had swerved to avoid a different pedestrian who had suddenly stepped on the road and that he drove at an acceptable speed of 40 km/h, despite the crash being severe enough to cause the van to overturn while also splitting open and uprooting a tree. Police conducted 17 alcohol tests on the victim before his death in the ambulance to prove he had been drunk at the time of the collision, 16 attempts yielding no results and the 17th showing he was sober. No such test was conducted on Vogt.

1954

Date (YYYY-MM-TT)	Name	Age	Place	State	Summary of events
1954-05-01	Minckwitz, Alfred Hans	47	East Berlin	Berlin	A man tried to escape border police after being unable to provide identifying papers and after several warning shots, he was shot in the back, later dying at Charité hospital.
1954-08-10	Doebbecke, Conrad	65	East Berlin	Berlin	A man from Wannsee in West Berlin drove into East German territory near the checkpoint Dreilinden, where he observed traffic for several minutes before driving back towards the highway. Although city commandant Pyotr Dibrova had ordered a cessation of searches following backlash over the death of Joachim Wozniak through drunk Soviet soldiers, two border policemen still tried to order the car to stop due to the suspicious incident, which instead accelerated. After a warning shot, four aimed gunshots were fired, three of which hit the driver in the left shoulder, left thigh and the hip. He was subsequently bandaged and brought to a hospital in Potsdam by the officers. Despite successful emergency surgery and a good prognosis, he died on 8 September from his wounds. The deceased had been suffering from Alzheimer's disease and was driving without a licence, as stated by his wife. His killing was widely publicised as he was a real estate owner in Berlin and also a famed antiques salesman and art collector, who sold over a hundred paintings to the Landesmuseum Hannover. It was not widely reported that he was an early member of the Nazi Party who had worked in the legal system as a jurist and obtained most of the artwork and land through seized property from Aryanisation. The officer who fired the killing shots was identified after reunification, but not charged as the statute of limitations had run out, since an investigation was already headed at the time of the shooting.
1954-11-15	Nettesheim, Helene	22	Düsseldorf	Nordrhein-Westfalen	A sports car did not stop after being signalled by a Bereitschaftspolizei officer due to a countrywide search for a gang of highway robbers. The officer fired a shot from his submachine gun at the fleeing vehicle, fatally striking the passenger, the wife of the driver, who later stated that he tried to avoid the traffic check because he was driving the car, which he was supposed to sell, without the owner's permission to attend his grandmother's 80th birthday and did not have papers for the vehicle. An article about the death inspired director Géza von Cziffra to make the 1955 film Bandits of the Autobahn.

1955

Date (YYYY-MM-TT)	Name	Age	Place	State	Summary of events
1955-01-29	Meier, Johannes	69	Buckow	Bezirk Frankfurt	A man was found cowering by the border to West Berlin by two border police officers. After he did not respond to verbal commands, an officer shot the man in the chest from a distance of six meters. The deceased had fled the GDR in 1953 and resided in West Berlin as a tolerated refugee. He had suffered from psychosis and been released from a two-month stay at mental asylum after being on suicide watch 17 days earlier.
1955-04-21	Schwietzer, Wilhelm	44	Kleinmachnow	Bezirk Potsdam	A man from West Berlin was arrested at Dreilinden S-Bahn by border police. He had formerly been a farmer in East German Cottbus, but moved away to avoid a fine illegal forest clearing to sell lumber in January 1950. Due to this, he was wanted and would have to serve 18 months in prison. Four police officer were escorting him to the station when he attempted to escape on foot and after a warning shot, at least two officers shot him 14 times in the back, after which he died at a hospital. Two of the officers were found after reunification, but they denied being the shooters. Since it could not be proven that they were responsible, the investigation was halted in December 1996.
1955-06-30	Bröker, Fredi	29	East Berlin	Berlin	A car driving into East Berlin was stopped by a Volkspolizei officer for an ID check. Afterwards, the officer got into the passenger seat and asked the man to drive up to the Alt-Treptow checkpoint further up. Instead, the driver put the car in reverse in direction of Neukölln in West Berlin. The officer then shot the driver in the arm, piercing into his stomach before exiting the car via tuck and roll. Heavily injured, the man managed to maneuver his car into West Berlin, where police brought him to a hospital, where he died on 5 July. It was found that the deceased was a former GDR citizen who had escaped East Germany after being arrested during the 1953 protests and took up the false identity of "Wolfgang Pankow". Despite being unemployed, he lived a wealthy lifestyle, owning an expensive BMW and living in a large apartment with several others. A search of the home yielded a number of licence plates, photo developing equipment, and several boxes, the contents of which were not disclosed by police. It's suspected that he was a member of an anti-communist organisation or a spy for a West German government agency.
1955-09-18	Borstel, Otto	22	East Berlin	Berlin	A man was shot by a Volkspolizei officer during a car search in Berlin-Mitte.
1955-11-21	Runge, Wilhelm	28	East Berlin	Berlin	A Volkspolizei officer was observing an abandoned property in Berlin-Mitte after he saw two men stealing scrap metal from there. He mistook two other men who had crossed over from West Berlin for the thieves and gave chase when they turned back to the border after spotting him. The officer fired a warning shot before shooting one of the men in the back. The man died on the way to the hospital. The shooter was identified, but could not be tracked down after reunification.
1955-12-30	Tögel, Walter	34	East Berlin	Berlin	Volkspolizei stopped a cyclist for a search at a Berlin-Mitte checkpoint into West Berlin. Because he was trying to smuggle several pounds of sausage, ham, and butter in his backpack, the man attempted to evade the officers, but he was pushed of his bike during the struggle. The man attempted to cross the border, but an officer shot him after firing several warning shots. The man was still able to make it to West Berlin territory, where he was brought to a hospital where he died the same day.

1956

Date (YYYY-MM-TT)	Name	Age	Place	State	Summary of events
1956-03-26	Scholz, Hans-Roland	15	East Berlin	Berlin	A teenager was shot and killed by border police in Grünau while attempting to escape to West Berlin with some colleagues.

1957

Date (YYYY-MM-TT)	Name	Age	Place	State	Summary of events
1957-04-15	Auris, Else	48	Großbeeren	Bezirk Potsdam	A woman was shot in Osdorfer Forest by border police while fleeing towards West Berlin and died at the scene from her wounds.
1957-04-XX	N.N.		Hannover	Niedersachsen	Police fatally shot a homeless vagrant in shrubbery after mistaking him for a wanted criminal.

1958

Date (YYYY-MM-TT)	Name	Age	Place	State	Summary of events
1958-01-10	N.N.		Mittenwald	Bayern	A 54-year-old police officer shot and killed a "drunken ruffian". He was put on trial on 29 September.
1958-06-05	N.N.	26	Neu-Ulm	Bayern	A man arrested for "approaching a woman in an indecent manner" was shot when he attempted to escape.
1958-08-13	Hettich, Peter	15	München	Bayern	A teenage apprentice was fatally shot after police caught him breaking into a youth center.

1959

Date (YYYY-MM-TT)	Name	Age	Place	State	Summary of events
1959-12-06	Bartolmee, Roland	18	Frankfurt am Main	Hessen	Two plainclothed police officers on night patrol in Altstadt saw a teenager walking and shouted at the figure to stop, without identifying themselves as police. The teenager ran off, at which point 35-year-old officer Edgar Hüttig fired a warning shot, supposedly in the air, although it was later determined the round grazed the teenager in the heel. Having lost track of the suspect, the officers issued more verbal commands, with Hüttig eventually firing another shot, which struck the suspect, who had been hiding behind cars and leapt to the side to sprint away. An unloaded gas pistol and two rounds were found in his pants pocket afterwards. Hüttig and his partner, Rudi Pfeffer, changed several details when reporting the incident to their superiors, such as the deceased's age (19 instead of 18) and the location of the gunshot (neck instead of forehead). The officers also claimed they believed him to be a car thief because he was passing too closely by the parked cars, despite him not having any tool in his hands. Hüttig was subsequently tried for negligent homicide in 1960.
1959-12-09	N.N.	33	Ludwigshafen	Rheinland-Pfalz	Three police officers were transporting a convict when he managed to escape during the drive. The officers subsequently fired and hit the convict in the legs and arms. It is not specified whether the wounds were fatal.
1959-XX-XX	N.N.	24	Hamburg	Hamburg	A man was subjected to two CN gas canisters inside a basement during a police operation. After his arrest, he suffered from breathing difficulties and subsequently died from pulmonary edema at a hospital.

=== 1960s ===
1960

Date (YYYY-MM-TT)	Name	Age	Place	State	Summary of events
1960-02-25	N.N.	33	Between Lünen and Dortmund	Nordrhein-Westfalen	A moped driver was fatally injured by a warning shot on a road, presumably on B236.
1960-03-XX	Beck, Ignaz	18	Frankfurt am Main	Hessen	Officer Werner Krug caught a burglar during a night-time break-in. The burglar fled and after firing a warning shot, Krug shot the man in the back of the head, later stating that he had missed and aimed for the legs.
1960-11-05	Czori, Joska	27	Hamburg	Hamburg	A fight broke out at a butcher's shop in Niendorf between Polish Roma, store staff, and other patrons after a member of the Roma had cut in line and was punched in the face by the owner. Police were called about a "brawl with gypsy involvement" and after beating some of them with nightsticks, a 47-year-old officer fired on three of the Roma, killing two and injuring one, reportedly because one had grabbed an officer's baton.
1960-11-05	Kwiek, Karol	26	Hamburg	Hamburg	A fight broke out at a butcher's shop in Niendorf between Polish Roma, store staff, and other patrons after a member of the Roma had cut in line and was punched in the face by the owner. Police were called about a "brawl with gypsy involvement" and after beating some of them with nightsticks, a 47-year-old officer fired on three of the Roma, killing two and injuring one, reportedly because one had grabbed an officer's baton.

1961

Date (YYYY-MM-TT)	Name	Age	Place	State	Summary of events
1961-12-03	N.N.	21	Brühl	Nordrhein-Westfalen	Two car thieves were incidentally stopped by a police patrol near a forest as they were driving a vehicle they had stolen three weeks earlier. The officers were shot at with a hunting rifle, leading them to return fire, during which one of the thieves was fatally shot.
1961-12-14	N.N.	20	Düsseldorf	Nordrhein-Westfalen	Police caught a man in the process of stealing a car. Upon spotting the officers heading his way, he drove away, with the officers trying to stop him by shooting at the car's tires, but as they were aiming too high, the bullets struck the driver instead, causing his death.

1962

Date (YYYY-MM-TT)	Name	Age	Place	State	Summary of events
1962-03-22	N.N.	23	Köln	Nordrhein-Westfalen	Passerby called police because a man was threatening his wife with a knife near the Aachener Weiher. Police arrived to find the man stabbing the woman, and after several verbal commands and warning shots, he was shot in the heart when he did not desist.
1962-05-23	Göring, Peter	21	East Berlin	Berlin	A soldier of the Border Troops of the German Democratic Republic, who was part of a patrol group along the Berlin–Spandau Ship Canal near the Invalids' Cemetery between East and West Berlin. On 23 May 1962, he observed a 14-year-old boy within the currents trying to hide himself from the guards. To prevent him from committing Republikflucht, several GDR-border guards shot at the boy in the river, injuring him with eight gunshots to the back. Göring left his post in the guard tower despite superior orders in an attempt to get in position for a clearer shot on the boy, also disregarding the general policy of not shooting towards at West German territory. The shots rang past a West German police patrol that had coincidentally passed by and was attempting to assist the boy, which led the officers to return fire on the guards, fatally hitting Göring and injuring another guard. Two bullets hit Göring directly, the deadly wound was caused by another bullet's ricochet.
1962-05-20	Weiß, Manfred	19	Henneberg	Bezirk Suhl	18-year-old East German Deutsche Grenzpolizei officer Günter Jablonski shot and killed his patrol partner during a nighttime detail at a border post. The officer fled into West Germany and requested asylum in Mellrichstadt after confessing to the murder. Jablonski was arrested and while a potential extradition was discussed, he was tried by the juvenile court of Landgericht Schweinfurt and sentenced to nine years imprisonment. The murdered officer was used for propaganda purposes by the East German government, with a memorial plaque and the renaming of his old unit in his honor over the next two decades. Jablonski was released on parole after serving six years, but in December 1978, he was arrested by East German police at Helmstedt–Marienborn border crossing while driving towards West Berlin. He was sentenced to life imprisonment by a military court in June 1979, but released in December 1988 following negotiations with West Germany. In October 2000, Jablonski received a 30,000 euro settlement as his arrest in East Germany was in violation of the Transit Agreement.
1962-05-XX	Diefenbacher, Volker		Bruchsal	Baden-Württemberg	Two police officers were cleaning their guns at the police station when the weapon of one accidentally misfired, killing the other.
1962-08-14	Arnstadt, Rudi	35	Wiesenfeld	Thüringen	Two soldiers of the Border Troops of the German Democratic Republic, Rudi Arnstadt and Karlheinz Roßner, encountered a West German Bundesgrenzschutz officer on East German territory and told him to leave. When the pair spotted another three BGS officers trespassing, they ambushed them with their guns drawn to put them under arrest. Roßner fired a warning shot and in reaction to this, one of the BGS officers, 23-year-old Hans Plüschke, then fatally shot Arnstadt above the right eye before returning to the West German side, telling his superiors they had been shot at. East German authorities sentenced Plüschke to 25 years imprisonment in absentia, but his extradition was not approved since Plüschke was not charged in West Germany, which deemed the shooting self-defense based on Plüschke's version of events. On 15 March 1998, 9 years after the dissolution of the SED and the reunification of Germany, Plüschke, who had now been working as a taxi driver, was found murdered on B84 near Hünfeld, around 10 km from Wiesenfeld, dead from a gunshot wound above the right eye. Plüschke had revealed his identity as the shooter in a RTL segment in 1993 and again in October 1997, due to which he had been receiving anonymous death threats. Former colleagues of Arnstadt, as well as his son and daughter were questioned, but no leads were obtained and the murder remains unsolved.
1962-XX-XX	N.N.		Hechingen	Baden-Württemberg	A police officer accidentally shot and killed a man. He was tried, but found not guilty of negligent homicide on 22 March 1963, partially because the court opined that a mechanical failure of the Beretta Model 38 he used could not be ruled out.

1963

Date (YYYY-MM-TT)	Name	Age	Place	State	Summary of events
1963-03-12	N.N.		Hamburg	Hamburg	Police shot and killed a painter who had killed a 76-year-old woman and her 64-year-old maid with scissors in a random attack during a work detail.
1963-07-10	N.N.		Hamburg	Hamburg	34-year-old police officer Karlheinz Weszel killed his wife and mother-in-law with his service pistol. Weszel and his wife were separated and while visiting the woman at her parents' home, she refused to let him accompany her to visit one of their children at a hospital. During the ensuing argument, the wife's mother took her daughter's side, at which point Weszel shot and killed both of them. The present father-in-law as well as the three other children, who were in a neighbouring room, were unharmed. Weszel was arrested and charged with murder.
1963-07-10	N.N.		Hamburg	Hamburg	

1964

Date (YYYY-MM-TT)	Name	Age	Place	State	Summary of events
1964-03-04	Schulz, Werner	28	Frankfurt am Main	Hessen	A bank robber armed with a pistol held up a Volksbank in Sachsenhausen, fleeing with 8,925 DM when police arrived, alerted by a silent alarm. The robber fled over the fire escape of a neighboring building and was shot through the chest by an officer from below as he made his way across rooftops. He died from a pierced lung on 14 March.
1964-10-08	Aielle, Ercole	30	München	Bayern	Police were called to a milk shop after the owner saw a man attempting to get behind the store counter. The presumed robber, an Italian guest worker, fled the scene upon seeing the officers and during the foot chase, the man pulled out a knife and injured one officer with a stab wound to the abdomen. Two warning shot were fired by police, after which the man was shot for attempting to attack again, dying at a hospital the same day.

1965

Date (YYYY-MM-TT)	Name	Age	Place	State	Summary of events
1965-08-27	Baum, Peter		Köln	Nordrhein-Westfalen	During the arrest of a car thief, a police officer was accidentally shot in the head by a colleague. He died on 24 December from his wounds after several brain surgeries and contracting yellow fever.

1966

Date (YYYY-MM-TT)	Name	Age	Place	State	Summary of events
1966-08-03	Schoen, Jürgen Rudolf	31	Hamminkeln	Nordrhein-Westfalen	Police were called after motorists reported a man from Griesheim for "unsociable behaviour" after he exposed himself to a truck driver at a rest stop. The man engaged two officers in a foot chase through shrubbery and was shot when an officer's gun accidentally discharged. Ammunition was found in his car, leading investigators to believe that the man, who had only one prior recorded incident with police, had been involved in criminal activity.

1967

Date (YYYY-MM-TT)	Name	Age	Place	State	Summary of events
1967-06-02	Ohnesorg, Benno	26	West Berlin	West Berlin	During a demonstration in Charlottenburg against the state visit of the Shah of Iran, Mohammad Reza Pahlavi, the West-Berlin police officer Karl-Heinz Kurras shot and killed a 26-year-old civilian, Benno Ohnesorg, with a close-range pistol shot to the back of the head. The ensuing post-killing investigation suffered from missing pieces of evidence, arranged testimonies of the attending policemen, and cover-ups in the medical record of the autopsy. Although Kurras' self-defense plea was dismissed in court, he was found not guily in a trial the same year. Kurras, who was suspended from duty shortly after the shooting, was rehired by West Berlin police in 1971 and became embroiled in a series of police misconduct cases, most prominently the sexual assault on a 9-year-old girl by grabbing and kissing her, while drunk on duty and illegally carrying a police firearm. In 2009, it was discovered that Karl-Heinz Kurras was listed as an informal collaborator of the East German secret police Stasi since 1955 and a long-time member of the Socialist Unity Party of Germany, the ruling East German Communist party, providing internal information of the West Berlin political police. It was ultimately determined that this affiliation was unrelated to the killing of Ohnesorg.

1968

Date (YYYY-MM-TT)	Name	Age	Place	State	Summary of events
1968-01-30	N.N.		Homberg	Nordrhein-Westfalen	A burglar was spotted on the roof of a two-story apartment building by patrons of a nearby pub. Upon being confronted by police, the burglar disobeyed orders to stay put and broke into a flat, beating a 68-year-old man into submission before jumping from a window onto the nearby street after finding the door out locked. He was shot by a police officer when he attempted to attack him with a screwdriver, dying on the way to a hospital. He remained unidentified.
1968-02-XX	Rösender, Walter	31	München	Bayern	A painter attacked 27-year-old police officer Walter Birnhäupl while at the former's apartment, threatening him with a knife before pushing the officer onto a sofa. Binrhäupl, then shot the man five times, causing his death at a hospital the same day.
1968-12-14	Djurik, Dujan	22	Nürtingen	Baden-Württemberg	A mentally ill Serb Yugoslavian migrant worker from Zabrežje went on a stabbing spree in a tenement building in Raidwangen, killing a 6-year-old boy and a 69-year-old man, both German nationals. as well as injuring 5 more people. The attacker was shot by a police officer he tried to attack.
1968-12-29/30	N.N.		Konstanz	Baden-Württemberg	A burglar was shot after fleeing from and engaging in a physical struggle with a police officer. The officer was criminally investigated.
1968-12-30	Kopf, Herbert	48	Rastatt	Baden-Württemberg	After a bank robbery in Badenweiler, robber Bruno Mateyka fled in a getaway vehicle with the bank manager as a hostage, pressing a gun to his temple while driving. Pursuing police fired over 100 shots at the vehicle, injuring Mateyka, who shot his hostage point-blank in the head. Mateyka was convicted of the murder, but the coroner also noted that the hostage had also been hit by police fire and that one of the wounds to the shoulder would have been fatal. The officers were investigated for misconduct, but not charged.

1969

Date (YYYY-MM-TT)	Name	Age	Place	State	Summary of events
1969-01-08	Stucke, Hans	29	Altbach	Baden-Württemberg	Two police officers searched the apartment of a previously convicted burglar suspected of stealing several pistols, a rifle, and ammo from a gun shop in Esslingen. After finding the loot under the bed, the officers waited for the man to come home and attempted to perform an arrest. Apparently aware of the police's presence, the man immediately fired a shot from a pistol upon arriving, killing 30-year-old officer Klaus Scharfenort. He was then shot and killed by the other officer.
1969-02-04	Witkowski, Friedhelm	21	Herne	Nordrhein-Westfalen	Three plainclothed police officers were tasked with apprehending a burglar at a homeless shelter. Two officers, 39-year-old Werner Bauland and 24-year-old Hans-Werner Grünberg, stayed outside the shelter while a third, 36-year-old Lothar Fülbier, entered dressed as a vagrant and asked around for the suspect in the barracks he was last recorded in. After locating the suspect lodging in an apartment leased by the family of his 18-year-old fiancée Dagmar Trzaskawka, Fülbier presented a gun in his coat, saying "Jetzt bist du dran" ("Now you're done for"). Trzaskawka, believing the officer to be a robber or criminal associate, then pushed her fiancé into the adjacent kitchen and shut the door on the officer, who fired four shots through the door, then another two through the door panel, narrowly missing Trzaskawka's parents and three of her younger siblings. The suspect tried to prevent Fülbier from entering by leaning against the door, but the officer broke through and immediately shot the man in the thigh. The man fled into another room, with Fülbier missing another shot just as Bauland, alerted by the gunfire, entered as well and fired a total of four shots, with one fatally injuring the suspect in the back. No one was charged, even after it was revealed that Fülbier had a blood alcohol level of 2,14 at the time of the operation.
1969-03-16	K., A.	26	Schleswig	Schleswig-Holstein	Three police officers saw a car run a stop sign and engaged in a car chase with the 28-year-old driver and his passenger, his fiancée. After being about to lose the car for the third time, an officer fired 16 shots at the vehicle, hitting the passenger in the hip and liver. The driver stopped the car on the side of the road and fled on foot. She was brought to a hospital in life-threatening condition and was alive as of 13 April, but no updates were made on her survival. The officer was to be indicted for negligent bodily harm.
1969-11-09	Ehlert, Bernd	9	Wolfach	Baden-Württemberg	A 37-year-old man, Bernhard Ehlert, threatened to kill his wife and children with a gun. When police stormed the apartment, a shot by police that injured the hostage taker passed through him and fatally struck one of his children.

=== 1970s ===
1970

Date (YYYY-MM-TT)	Name	Age	Place	State	Summary of events
1970-01-20	Möller, Fritz	37	Husum	Schleswig-Holstein	31-year-old police officer Wilhelm Soost was on patrol in search for cable thieves when he was informed by a Schutzpolizei colleague that a possible break-in was occurring inside an empty house in Rödemis, after a "beam of light" was seen inside. Soost and three Schupo officers arrived at the house and announced their presence, which was seemingly heard by the occupant, but ignored. As the light had now been turned off, Soost and 23-year-old Schupo officer Volker Schildger broke inside by smashing a window and went to the upstairs room, where they ordered the occupant to open the door before Schildiger kicked it open. The drunk man inside fired several aimed shots from a handgun, without hitting anyone, and demanded the "intruders" identify themselves. The officers returned fire, fatally wounding the shooter, before identifying themselves as police. As the man collapsed, he fired three shots at officer Schildger, killing him. The deceased was revealed to be a truck driver who had been house sitting for his employer, with police having been falsely informed that the house was abandoned for several years. The gun used by the deceased was legally owned.

1971

Date (YYYY-MM-TT)	Name	Age	Place	State	Summary of events
1971-01-31	Braatz, Peter	27	West Berlin	Berlin	A car thief was caught in the act in front of the Theater des Westens and restrained by the owner of the vehicle and a taxi driver when he was shot in the neck by 38-year-old police officer Horst Salzwedel, also injuring the taxi driver. The officer variously stated that he wanted "quiet to come" or that the thief had reached into his pocket. Salzwedel claimed to have no recollection of shooting the suspect, but an investigation showed that the officer had held the pistol into the side of the man's neck at point-blank range. He was sentenced to seven months probation on 27 September.
1971-05-09/11	N.N.		Düsseldorf	Nordrhein-Westfalen	A burglar was fatally shot in the head by a police officer after he opened fire during his escape.
1971-05-20/21	N.N.		München	Bayern	Police were notified because a drunk migrant worker was wielding a gun in a bar. Officers shot the man in what they described as self-defense, after which the weapon was identified as a gas pistol.
1971-05-24	Albert, Hans	27	München	Bayern	A prison escapee was shot and killed by Kripo while driving in Schwabing. Ten shots were fired on the moving vehicle.
1971-05-28	N.N.		Hamburg	Hamburg	A drunk man was firing a gas pistol at his doorstep and then fatally shot in the head by plainclothed police as a result.
1971-06-09	N.N.	21	Herne	Nordrhein-Westfalen	A burglar was shot eleven times by two police officers and died several months later of his wounds after 23 August.
1971-07-07	Christ, Ernst	28	Mannheim	Baden-Württemberg	An inmate suffering from meningitis was pelted with stones in his cell because an officer was annoyed by his constant screaming. He was then locked in a holding cell for the night, with the heating turned up all the way during an outside temperature of 30 degrees Celsius. The inmate was found dead the next morning, but the officer was not charged.
1971-07-15	Schelm, Petra	20	Hamburg	Hamburg	A member of the RAF, Schelm was shot in the face while fleeing from police, after she and Werner Hoppe had broken through a police road block in Bahrenfeld.
1971-08-04	Rammelmayr, Hans Georg	31	München	Bayern	Two bank robbers, German national Hans Georg Rammelmayr and Austiran national Dimitri Todorov, held up a Deutsche Bank location in Prinzregentenstraße. Police had complied with their demands for two million mark and a getaway vehicle, but once Rammelmayr entered the car as the last one, police marksmen opened fire, striking him and one of the hostages, killing both. Police initially assumed that Rammelmayr had shot the hostage in his dying moments, but the attending medical team, which included the incumbent second mayor of Munich Hans Steinkohl, and the pathologist found that the caliber she had been shot with did not belong to the PPSh-41 he had been carrying.
1971-08-04	Reppel, Ingrid	20	München	Bayern	
1971-08-10	N.N.		Münster	Nordrhein-Westfalen	A drunk man shot at police during a blood test. He was shot in the shoulder "to put him out of combat", but the man died of the wound before 23 August.
1971-08-XX	N.N.		Mühlheim	Hessen	During the pursuit of a burglar, a police officer aimed to shoot him in the legs, but instead fatally shot him in the stomach.
1971-08-XX	Kozinowski, Harald	32	St. Georgen	Baden-Württemberg	Police were congregating in front of an apartment building to deal with a resident who had taken his family at gunpoint. With commands to fire at will, an officer accidentally killed an uninvolved neighbor with a shot through the right eye, after the man, curious about the unannounced police presence, had opened his bedroom window for a better look.
1971-08-XX	Putra, Josip		München	Bayern	A Yugoslavian migrant worker was accidentally killed by police when an officer's sidearm discharged and hit him in the stomach.
1971-08-18/19	N.N.		Mannheim	Baden-Württemberg	A Greek national fled after he was caught attempting to sell hashish to an undercover officer and was subsequently shot in the chest when he stopped and pulled out a knife.
1971-10-25	N.N.	24	Tübingen	Baden-Württemberg	A police officer was sent to a building due to an argument during a party. The officer felt threatened and shot three Portuguese migrant workers, one of whom died from a pierced heart. The local attorney's office attributed the shooting to heightened police's fears over the murder of police officer Norbert Schmid by RAF members three days earlier.
1971-11-09	N.N.		Sinsheim	Baden-Württemberg	A police officer shot a man after he attacked another officer.
1971-12-04	von Rauch, Georg	24	West Berlin	Berlin	A police cruiser was shadowing a car with a stolen licence plate, suspected to belong to members of the militant anarchist 2 June Movement. Police stopped the car and an associated van on the street in Schöneberg, during which the passenger of the main vehicle, 24-year-old Bommi Baumann, escaped. As one policeman chased after Baumann, the remaining officer, Hans-Joachim Schulz, took the driver of the car and the occupants of the van at gunpoint and ordered them to face the shuttered doors of a nearby furniture store for frisking. According to Schulz, he backed away from the arrestees upon realizing he was alone, at which point he claimed the men pulled out guns and shot at him. The driver of the car, identified as a wanted 2 June Movement fugitive, was fatally shot in the right eye. Schulz fired seven gunshots while fourteen shots were fired from five other weapons. Newspapers initially reported that two other anarchist gunmen had opened fire on Schulz from the opposite street, and that these gunmen had killed the victim, disproven by the ammunition type matching Schulz's. Police later admitted that four BfV officers were at the scene as part of the arrest, but claimed that they were unarmed. An eyewitness and an emergency call that captured audio of the shooting contradicted several details of Schulz's account, including the number of initial gunshots and their source. While the two men in the van were armed, no gun was found on the deceased. Representatives of the 2 June Movement alleged that Schulz had accidentally opened fire when he was startled by head movement of the suspect. The officer was found not guilty in a court ruling in 1972, citing self-defence, although the actual sequence of events was still questioned at the 1975 trial of Bommi Baumann.
1971-12-29	Vicenik, Kurt	44	Baltersweiler	Saarland	On 27 December, three bank robbers held up a Deutsche Bank location at the square of Cologne Cathedral. The robbers shot into the ceiling and forced their hostages against the wall as they retrieved 311,000 DM from the vault, but because an alarm system was activated, alerting a police troop from a nearby armored bank truck, the scene was surrounded by SEK, who shot out the tires of the getaway vehicle. After threatening the life of the hostages for two hours, a vehicle was provided, with two high-ranking police officials volunteering to replace two hostages they would take with them and drive the robbers south to the French border at their request. The eight-hour drive was always followed by police at a distance, as well as journalists, one of whom jumped on the car's windshield to take a photo during a red light and was nearly shot for it, but all lost track of the robbers when they passed through Saarbrücken. When the officer driving refused to drive into France, the robbers left on foot and took another car and the 21-year-old driver hostage. They were discovered after a 45-hour manhunt, driving north of Saarbrücken after apparently getting lost. The main robber demanded another police official in exchange for the hostage, for which Police Council Julius Groß was brought in via helicopter. While discussing the terms, Groß noticed he had a clear shot on the robber and the accomplices were distracted, pulling out his sidearm to command a surrender, shooting and injuring the robber in the torso as he reached for his own gun. Two stray shots were fired by the robber that almost hit the hostage motorist, but the shooting allowed for the arrest of all three suspects. The gang were identified as an Austrian and two French nationals, all with connections to "low-level organized crime" in Marseille. The Austrian ringleader died of his wounds fifteen days later on 13 January 1972.

1972

Date (YYYY-MM-TT)	Name	Age	Place	State	Summary of events
1972-01-01	Neumann, Robert	18	Hamburg	Hamburg	Police arrested a teenager in Farmsen because he was causing a disturbance during New Year's Eve. At the station, two police officers beat the teenager with batons while a third choked him, causing his death. Police claimed self-defense.
1972-01-31	Finnendahl, Gerhard Arnold	32	Mannheim	Baden-Württemberg	A car thief driving a stolen semi-trailer truck engaged police in a 60 km/h chase over the Mannheim Interchange on either A6 or A656, ignoring commands and signals to stop. When the driver pulled over and attempted to flee on foot, an officer shot him in the back of the head in what was later deemed self-defense.
1972-02-07	Böse, Wilhelm		Regensburg	Bayern	Off-duty police officer Peter Gröbel killed a waiter who had refused to serve the drunk customer more alcohol. The officer used his sidearm, which he carried privately to "ward off thugs". In April 1973, Gröbel was convicted of manslaughter and sentenced to four years imprisonment.
1972-02-18	Stelzer, Heinz	32		Hessen	Two men were being pursued by police on suspicion of committing a post office robbery in December 1971, stealing 41,000 DM. One of the suspects was fatally shot by an officer.
1972-02-27	N.N.		Nürnberg	Bayern	As police were pursuing an Italian national in a car chase, he shot and killed 29-year-old police officer Roland Luff before being fatally shot by his colleagues.
1972-03-01	Epple, Richard	17	Herrenberg	Baden-Württemberg	A teenage mechanic from Breitenholz was driving the family car drunk and without a licence. He did not obey a police order to stop, unaware that they had only noticed his broken taillight. During the 20 km car chase over B28, the teenager broke through three street blockades. Police wrongly concluded that the driver may be an RAF terrorist and ordered officers to stop the car by all means. After three warning shots, 26-year-old officer Hans Jörg Geigis fired nine gunshots through the rear window. An investigation decided that the police response was in line with protocol, and no one was charged. The youth centre "Epplehaus" was named after the deceased. Geigis committed suicide with his sidearm in 1975.
1972-03-02	Weisbecker, Thomas	23	Augsburg	Bayern	Member of the 2 June Movement. Weisbecker was shot by police officers during an arrest attempt. The incident's details are unclear.
1972-03-27	N.N.	20-30	Bremen	Bremen	A burglar engaged police in a shootout and was by officers killed in self-defense.
1972-04-30	Braun, Burkhard	25	Gießen	Hessen	Two men were stopped for a traffic check while driving a stolen car and immediately opened fire, injuring one officer in the chest and shoulder. 25 officers ended up returning fire and killing the car's driver.
1972-05-18	N.N.	16	Landau	Rheinland-Pfalz	Police were called to a domestic incident because a teenage boy was arguing with his parents. Officers found the boy sitting at a table, holding two knives. At police's orders, he put one knife on the table and said "If you talk calmly to me, I'll put the other one away too". Immediately after, an officer fired two gunshots from a distance of three meters, instantly killing the boy.
1972-06-02	N.N.	18	Frankfurt am Main	Hessen	Police stopped a rental car with two occupants for a traffic check near the train station to ask for a driving permit. The driver, a U.S. Army soldier, then fired four gunshots at the involved officer, who killed the man after returning fire. The passenger took the wheel and fled the scene before being arrested.
1972-06-25	Macleod, Iain James Torquil	34	Stuttgart	Baden-Württemberg	The Federal Criminal Police Office incorrectly identified Iain Macleod (also Ian McLeod), a British citizen from Scotland, as a supporter of the RAF and launched a raid on his apartment in Asemwald. When the officers were about to force open the bedroom door, Macleod, who had been asleep until then, opened the door, screamed upon seeing the armed officers, and then shut it again. The head of the raid team fired two shots through the closed door, hitting Macleod in the back and killing him. The shooting was deemed self-defense and no investigation launched, though the deceased's mother received 135,000 DM in compensation.
1972-07-02	N.N.	22	Nürnberg	Bayern	A burglar was shot by police while breaking into a garden house. The offending officer stated the burglar had attacked him with an iron bar and claimed self-defense.
1972-07-04	Duifhuis, Paul Theodor	24	Duisburg	Nordrhein-Westfalen	A police patrol attempted to stop Theo Duifhuis (also Theo Doifhuis) for a traffic violation, causing him to flee. When he was eventually stopped and ordered to raise his hands by police officer Werner Terholt, he took his hand from a pocket and was shot, because the officer felt threatened.
1972-07-25	N.N.		München	Bayern	A burglar was shot by police because the officer claimed to have seen an unspecified weapon in his hand.
1972-07-XX	N.N.		Frankfurt am Main	Hessen	Two U.S. Army soldiers were seen trying to start their car while drunk. Police ordered the men to exit the vehicle, after which the officers opened fire, killing one of the men, who was African-American. The shooting was claimed as self-defense because the deceased had bent down to pull at a shoelace.
1972-09-06	Hamid, Afif Ahmed		Fürstenfeldbruck	Bayern	Munich massacre: During 1972 Olympic Games, eight members of the Black September Organization stormed the Olympic Village quarters of the Israeli Olympic team, killing two people and taking the remaining nine hostage. The terrorists demanded the release of hundreds of detainees from Israeli prison for their safety. Negotiations and a rescue effort at the village failed. Police attempted to secure the hostages at Fürstenfeldbruck airfield as their captors were there for a getaway plane, but the ensuing shootout resulted in the deaths of five of the terrorists by police marksmen, and the deaths of all the hostages and one police officer by the BSO militants. Three of the terrorists were arrested, but exchanged for the hostages of the Lufthansa Flight 615 hijacking a month later.
1972-09-06	Thaa, Ahmed Chic		Fürstenfeldbruck	Bayern	
1972-09-06	Afif, Luttif	27 or 35	Fürstenfeldbruck	Bayern	
1972-09-06	Jawad, Kahlid	18	Fürstenfeldbruck	Bayern	
1972-09-06	Nazzal, Yusuf	35	Fürstenfeldbruck	Bayern	
1972-10-24/25	N.N.		Kulmbach	Bayern	An off-duty police officer killed his wife's lover with his service pistol after catching them in a sex act in his car. The officer turned himself in and was charged with murder.
1972-10-25	N.N.		Rosenheim	Bayern	A police officer killed his father-in-law with his service pistol following an extensive dispute between the two men. The officer turned himself in and was charged with murder.
1972-11-25	Widera, Viktor	58	Frankfurt am Main	Hessen	On 24 November, a man dressed up as a cleaner entered Frankfurt Airport and loitered on the airfield. Coincidentally, an Air Canada DC‐8 bound for Montréal and Toronto was being emptied of passengers after a female passenger made a complaint about "suspicious looks" of other occupants and demanded all luggage be searched. Using the opportunity, the man rushed aboard and ordered the crew to leave the plane at gunpoint with a revolver, taking 31-year-old stewardess Margit Sommer as a hostage. During the 24-hour stand-off, the hostage-taker demanded the release of all Czechoslovak spies, German anarchist and communist terrorists, Lubomir Adamica, who was the ringleader of the 1972 Slov-Air hijacking, well as for "the bells of the Frankfurt Cathedral to be rung", otherwise threatening to blow up the plane. He was shot in the heart by SEK forces, to the applause of onlookers. It was noted that the perpetrator had a history of mental illness, had no known political activities and, contrary to initial assumptions and reports, was not of Czech origin (he was born in Beuthen, Upper Silesia which is now Poland).
1972-11-28	Didwiller, Fritz	48	Waiblingen/Urbach	Baden-Württemberg	Two men were caught attempting to break open a vending machine and fled from police. An officer fatally shot the elder of the two suspects in the back and injured the 18-year-old accomplice with two gunshots. The officer claimed self-defense and that he believed that the pipe wrench held by the deceased was a firearm. He also insisted that he only intended to fire one shot, but that the safety mechanism of his Beretta submachine gun failed, which was only confirmed in August 1973, when the manufacturer had already been cleared of responsibility.

1973

Date (YYYY-MM-TT)	Name	Age	Place	State	Summary of events
1973-02-04	Hübner, Heinz-Dieter	18	Söhlde	Niedersachsen	28-year-old police officer Karl-Heinz Kropp was dispatched to Nettlingen to expel a drunk customer from a pub where he had been previously banned for a brawl. After the man refused to leave before he finished his beer, Kropp hit the man in the arm with his gun, then shoved the barrel in his abdomen, during which a fatal discharge occurred.
1973-02-12	Stülper, Manfred	24	Radevormwald	Nordrhein-Westfalen	During an attempted arrest of a serial burglar in Hagen, the suspect opened fire on the two dispatched policemen with a revolver, hitting 34-year-old police officer Manfred Tophoven in the upper arm, grazing the chest of 22-year-old officer Wolfgang Ritz as well as injuring his own mother. The offender escaped in his car over B229, taking Tophoven with him as a hostage at gunpoint. Despite Tophoven telling his partner to not pursue them, police surrounded the vehicle at a red light. As Tophoven attempted to dissuade his colleagues from approaching, the burglar fatally shot his hostage four times in the back. The kidnapper died at a hospital after being struck by two shots in the chest and throat by police.
1973-02-15/16	N.N.	50	Frankfurt	Hessen	An Italian guest worker was shot and killed by police. The officer stated he felt threatened.
1973-03-02	L., Günter	17	Stuttgart	Baden-Württemberg	A teenage suspect was shot in the back by officer N. Weckbach during a foot chase.
1973-04-30	Frank, Rudolf "Rudi"	14	Eschwege	Hessen	A teenager took his father's car for a nightly joyride with friends, after which a police car engaged in pursuit of the vehicle for crossing several red lights. The car passed numerous blockades, once nearly hitting an officer who jumped out of the path, while the passengers threw unspecified explosive devices and a molotov cocktail. After several verbal commands and warning shots failed, officer Hans-Peter Hofmann shot the car's driver twice in the head as it approached another road block, fatally injuring him. Five bullet holes were inside the car. The surviving teenagers were charged with civil disorder while the boy's parents unsuccessfully attempted to get Hofmann tried for manslaughter.
1973-05-31	Lehmann, Anton	53	Heidelberg	Baden-Württemberg	Police were called over a dispute between a pub owner and customer who had come to buy a crate of beer for his mother's birthday, but didn't want to pay for bottle deposit. The owner's mother then threatened the customer and his son with a pizzle whip. The father-son pair damaged the interior and beat both women up in response. Five officers were sent to the family home, wielding batons at the ready, and fought with the man and three of his sons, all armed with wooden boards or spades, who shouted insults at them. A bystander reportedly fired a gas pistol at the scuffle to assist the officers. The fight ended when 8 shots were fired by a 23-year-old injured police officer, striking the father 4 times while the others struck his sons. The shooting was deemed self-defense and the sons were given sentences of up to 2 years imprisonment for assault. An investigation in 2020 showed that the family was regularly discriminated against by locals due to their Sinti Romani heritage and had regular run-ins with the law for defamation and assault. The deceased, who had survived internment at Auschwitz-Birkenau, had called the police officers "Nazi swine", apparently because the pub owner's mother had previously told him, "Ihr dreckigen Zigeuner gehört vergast" ("You filthy gypsies should be gassed").
1973-06-08	Kalcev, Nikola	16	München	Bayern	A Czechoslovak teenager armed with a big bore handgun held up a bank, taking the 20 staff members and 12 customers inside hostage, demanding money through a note. Two employees were able to call police, who attempted to storm the bank from the front, but retreated due to threats by the robber against the hostages. After receiving 20,000 DM, the boy attempted to escape with a female employee as a hostage through the basement, where he was fatally shot by hidden officers.
1973-08-21	Dobhardt, Erich	17	Dortmund	Nordrhein-Westfalen	A homeless teenager who had previously evaded arrest for multiple thefts was shot in the back by 31-year-old police officer Rolf Diehl while he ran from police for stealing a portable radio. Diehl was charged with negligent homicide and sentenced to six months imprisonment and probation in May 1975. On 2 November 1973, members of the Red Army Faction named the first building they illegally occupied in Dortmund after the victim.
1973-08-27	N.N.	30	Düsseldorf	Nordrhein-Westfalen	A drunk man was shot and killed by police.
1973-08-31	Dicknöther, Herbert	21	Erbach	Hessen	A machinist suspected of arms trafficking attempted to flee during a sting operation. MEK fired two warning shots at the man's car before firing at the tires. The gunshot missed, pierced the car body and fatally struck the driver. The officer was not required to attend his subsequent trial and the shooting was justified as the deceased, as a presumed arms dealer, could have fired on police.
1973-10-??	Mauermann, Klaus	38	Gütersloh	Nordrhein-Westfalen	A mentally ill man threatened his father with a small-bore rifle, forcing him to leave the building before barricading himself inside with his three young children. Police negotiated with the gunman for several hours, leading to the release of the two youngest children. After the gunman shot and injured a police officer, police stormed the building and fatally shot the attacker. The guman had previously armed his remaining eight-year-old son with a gas pistol, firing several shots at the officers without injurying anyone.
1973-11-12	Gewitsch, Horst	21	Reutlingen	Baden-Württemberg	
1973-12-17	N.N.	38	Salzgitter	Niedersachsen	A Turkish guest worker was shot and killed by police.
1973-12-27	Vast, Hans Peter	25	Mannheim	Baden-Württemberg	On 21 December, a known petty criminal was caught attempting to steal a car while drunk. While in custody at JVA Mannheim, the man made constant and loud requests for headache medicine, for which the on-duty officer punched him in the face. When he continued to make noise, the officer called in two other officers, who had become intoxicated on their break, and together, they beat the prisoner with punches, batons and a key ring used as a makeshift brass knuckle. The officers then cleaned the cell of blood and replaced broken furnishing, after which they hid the unconscious man under the bed in his cell. He died approximately three hours later, having choked on vomit and been restricted in his movements due to his debilitating, although not fatal, injuries and cramped position under the bed. The investigation for joint venture in attempted homicide and joint manslaughter was halted in June, but the death was explicitly labeled "neither by accident, suicide, or by proxy". The instigating officer, 43-year-old Oswald Meisch, committed suicide while detained, after confessing to the details of the death. His suicide note claimed that he had "lost his nerves then, again today".

1974

Date (YYYY-MM-TT)	Name	Age	Place	State	Summary of events
1974-01-06	N.N.		Olpe	Nordrhein-Westfalen	A woman called police because her husband was threatening her with a pistol. The man injured one of the officers with a gunshot during the confrontation and was fatally shot in return.
1974-03-28	N.N.	33	München	Bayern	A suspected car thief was arrested by two special officers after a traffic check. While at the police station, the man asked to step out of his bindings and opened fire with a revolver. He was killed in the shootout and police suspected that the man's female passenger had handed him the weapon after a strip search. His identity could not be established.
1974-04-18	Martin-Gonzales, Emilio Humberto	28	Hamburg	Hamburg	1974 Hamburg bank robbery: A Colombian student took hostages during a bank robbery at a Commerzbank in St. Georg. After shooting at two responding officers, killing 34-year-old Uwe Faden, a three-hour negotiation with police ended with authorities agreeing to the robber's escape via a provided car, with the actual goal of fatally shooting the robber in the first recorded instance of a planned "fatal shot". When exiting the bank with a hostage, a knife pressed to his throat, three special officers ambushed the robber. Eight shots were fired in total, with the robber dying to a close-range headshot by an officer who had hidden around the corner.
1974-05-21	Jendrian, Günther	24	München	Bayern	In search of a wanted felon, plain-clothed masked police officers raided a Maxvorstadt apartment on Adalbertstraße. Police shot through Jendrian's apartment door and walls before entering. It is reported that Jendrian had reached for his smallbore rifle and was shot because of this. A 24-year-old Romanian tenant was almost struck by a ricochet. It turned out he was mistaken for 23-year-old Roland Otto, a serial bank robber and 2 June movement affiliate through Werner Sauber. Whether he recognized the intruders as police officers is unclear.
1974-05-20	Keim, Walter		Hannover	Niedersachsen	A bank robber was caught inside a pedestrian tunnel and shot several times by police wielding submachine guns.
1974-06-05	Routhier, Günter	45	Essen	Nordrhein-Westfalen	Routhier, an early retired man, was a visitor at a court hearing. After disturbances, the room was cleared by police officers, carrying Routhier down a stair hall. During this, his head hit the wall and floor. He died two weeks later on 18 June from intercranial bleedings.
1974-07-17	Remiszko, Hans-Jürgen	23	Mannheim	Baden-Württemberg	A man was asked for personal documents by three plainclothed officers of the newly established MEK while celebrating his birthday next night at a disco in Käfertal. Because the officers, who were dressed as rockers, would not provide police identification, he assumed they were trying to lure him into a mugging and called for help. Two officers 28 year-old Johann Kastner and 24-year-old Wolfgang Scholl, immediately pulled out their weapons and fired six shots shortly after, mortally wounding the man with two and the remaining ones heavily injuring his 28-year-old friend and 32-year-old onlooker, the former with a life-threatening stomach shot. An ambulance arrived only 30 minutes later, by which point the man had already died of blood loss. Police cited self-defense, claiming that the deceased had grabbed an officer's gun, put it to his head and threatened to shoot, and that the injured were part of roughly 40 rockers that had attacked them. Kastner put the deceased's mother on trial on 29 March 1977 for slander and fined 50 DM. The 2021 crime novel "Kaliszko, Mannheim im Sommer 1974" and its protagonist was loosely based on the killing.
1974-08-26	Hoffmann, Blasius		München	Bayern	Residents called police because a neighbour was firing a gun in the courtyard. Officers stormed the apartment and fatally shot the tenant, who had been using a gas pistol.
1974-07-XX	L., Michael	29	München	Bayern	A burglar attempted to flee after an arrest and was fatally shot as a result. The killing was later deemed "accidental" in nature.
1974-08-01/30	Wresnick, Dieter		Minden	Nordrhein-Westfalen	A robber was killed by two shots in the torso after he had non-fatally shot a female clerk and a police officer.

1975

Date (YYYY-MM-TT)	Name	Age	Place	State	Summary of events
1975-01-15	Wiesneth, Ernst	18	München	Bayern	A teenager from Taufkirchen drove his parents' car without a licence and engaged in a car chase after refusing to stop for a police check. When he eventually came to a stop, he locked himself in his car, which led the officer 32-year-old Peter Presse, to believe that the teenager was a wanted criminal. Presse, who had previously received a 150 DM reward for proactive behavior, subsequently broke the car's side window with the barrel of his gun, supposedly shouting "Komm heraus, du Schwein" ("Get out of there, you pig"), then fired two shots into the vehicle. Presse later claimed that he opened fire because the occupant had "reached towards his knee area". He was charged and sentenced to nine months probation for negligent homicide.
1975-02-20	Papadopoulos, Adam	61	Rüsselsheim	Hessen	A Greek gas station owner caught two burglars at his beverage storage and fired several gunshots at them with a pistol, causing them to flee. The noise alerted a passing police car with two plainclothed officers inside, whom the owner falsely assumed were accomplices. Due to the ambiguous situation, officers opened fire on the man when he made a sudden turning motion, striking him in the chest. At the hospital, one of the burglars turned himself and told police of the true cirrcumstances, having intended to steal beer crates.
1975-03-01	Heisterberg, Horst		Bad Münder	Niedersachsen	A false bomb threat was issued to a private clinic in Hanover, with demands for 20,000 DM. Police arrived at the drop-off in Eimbeckhausen and while an officer communicated with the blackmailer, a man was spotted in a nearby phone booth. The man was shot and killed because he fled from officers. He was positively identified as the blackmailer.
1975-03-16	Rohs, Manfred	25	Köln	Nordrhein-Westfalen	A woman called police because her boyfriend was drunk and trashing their apartment at a homeless shelter in Vingst. Two police officers ordered the man to give himself up and fired multiple shots when he pointed a defective and unloaded .45 Navy Colt at them.
1975-03-20	N.N.		Frankfurt am Main	Hessen	During the arrest of two drug dealers, an officer mistook a plainclothed colleague for another accomplice and fatally shot him.
1975-04-07	N.N.	33	Nürnberg	Bayern	A burglar was about to be arrested after exiting a store near Nürnberg Hauptbahnhof when he pulled out a gun and fatally shot one of the officers, 36-year-old Johannes Schauß. In the subsequent scuffle, the burglar was also shot and killed.
1975-04-07	Hollossy, Istvan	26	Hamburg	Hamburg	A Hungarian serial robber held up a jewelry store in Hohenfelde, killing the owner's 66-year-old wife in the process. During his escape through the area, the robber killed a 38-year-old woman and injured four other people. After forcing a taxi driver to drive him from the scene and fleeing through various storefronts on foot, he was surrounded by 250 MEK officers in the basement of a villa and while in a shootout during an attempted arrest, the robber shot frontmost officer Bernd Wilhelm in the jaw. The officers retreated, and flooded the basement with tear gas. When MEK went down to retrieve the shooter, they found he had been hit by several gunshots and died shortly after the discovery.
1975-05-09	Sauber, Werner	29	Köln	Nordrhein-Westfalen	Swiss member of the 2 June Movement. When he and two other terrorists got into a police control, they opened fire on the police, killing officer Walter Pauli. During the shootout, he was hit and later died on the way to the hospital.
1975-05-26	N.N.	25	Mannheim	Baden-Württemberg	Police shot and killed an unarmed burglar whom they caught in the act inside a restaurant.
1975-07-12	Sayin, Mustafa	31	Frankfurt am Main	Hessen	A plainclothed police officer shot two Turkish guest workers from around 4 meters distance. One of the men died after three days in a hospital from three gunshots to the heart while the other, Ferhat Coban, survived after 15 days in critical condition from six gunshots. The officer claimed he was approached by a group of men who "offered him a woman and tried to shake him down for 20 DM" and that he opened fire when the men attacked him for declining. The Union of Workers from Turkey cited an account by two other Turkish workers, who allege that they saw the officer run up behind their colleagues and hitting one before pulling out a gun and shooting at those involved. After the man was identified as a police officer, backup spent 45 minutes photographing the scene before calling an ambulance for the injured.
1975-11-01	O'Neal, M.C.		Walldorf	Baden-Württemberg	An African-American U.S. Army soldier stationed in at the United States Army Garrison Heidelberg was caught in a drug deal sting operation, but managed to flee as a police officer shot and missed him. The next morning, when American military police and West German police stormed his apartment, the soldier appeared in a hallway with a gun in his hand and was immediately shot in the head by a German policeman. The weapon was identified as a gas pistol.
1975-11-05	N.N.	50	Schwäbisch Hall	Baden-Württemberg	A mentally ill farmer was shot by police in his house after he beat his aunt to death and heavily injured both his sisters.
1975-11-15	Fuchs, Willy	39	Köln	Nordrhein-Westfalen	Police were conducting a stake-out operation at an apartment in Innenstadt, following a hostage situation that took place there. A known criminal had overpowered and tied up an acquaintance, stolen papers to his car and briefly left, during which time the hostage managed to flee and call police. When the suspect returned, he fired a shot that missed the officers and proceeded to hide in a cabinet, from where he continued to threaten police with his weapon. An officer fired 19 shots at the closet, killing the occupant.
1975-11-30	Tatzko, Christian	21	München	Bayern	Five men were driving a stolen car and caught the attention of police when they crashed into a streetlight. A large-scale search with several response units and police dogs arrested three within a short time, leaving only two offenders on the run. Officer Martin Tolksdorf found one of the car thieves and claimed to have given a warning shot before firing two aimed shots when he saw the man reach into his jacket pocket. It was determined, however, that the deceased was shot from behind, with the remaining thief, who witnessed the shooting, claiming that the officer shouted a command to stop and fired the shots simultaneously while still running.
1975-12-11	Önler, Vahit	33	Kornwestheim	Baden-Württemberg	A Turkish migrant worker was arrested for causing a moped accident and was slated for deportation after it was found his residency permit was about to expire. As he was being escorted out of a holding cell to a local court, he threatened the officer with a concealed glass shard and fled on foot. The escapee was caught by a uniformed and a plainclothed officer, and when he raised his arms in surrender, the plainclothed officer fired three shots, two hitting the man in the chest. Both officers left to get backup, leaving the worker to die of blood loss. The scene was not secured and no charges were made.
1975-XX-XX	N.N.	24	München	Bayern	Police arrived at the apartment of a truck driver to arrest him for causing and leaving the scene of a car accident. Officers shot the man after he reportedly charged at police with a "long, shiny object" in his hand, later confirmed to be a spoon.

1976

Date (YYYY-MM-TT)	Name	Age	Place	State	Summary of events
1976-01-02	Breyer, Stephan	19	Hamburg	Hamburg	An armed burglar broke into a bank through the glass door entrance and engaged in an extended stand-off with MEK. There were no hostages and the surrounding area had been evacuated by police. The robber was killed after he emerged from inside and fired several shots with a 4 mm handgun and was shot multiple times by police, dying from a gunshot to the neck. Afterwards, the building was teargassed and two hours later, the building was stormed and cleared for other suspects. No money had been taken and the deceased had largely stayed in the director's office, where he had consumed cigars and cognac.
1976-01-23	N.N.	34	Reichenau	Baden-Württemberg	A man was firing a gun inside an apartment building, setting fire to his own room. A police officer shot the man in the head after being fired upon.
1976-01-XX	Szykora, Helene	59	Dortmund	Nordrhein-Westfalen	A police vehicle struck and killed a pedestrian in a southern part of the city. Despite the car being rendered inoperable in the collision, officers claimed that the car drove at an acceptable speed of 50 to 55 km/h. Witnesses noted that the deceased as being flung 10 meters into the air.
1976-03-19	N.N.	36	Mosbach	Baden-Württemberg	A mentally ill woman was threatening her parents with an axe at the family home. Responding medical and police services were similarly threatened and after tear gas failed, the woman was shot.
1976-03-24	N.N.	35	Münchhausen	Hessen	Police attempted to arrest a wanted man convicted of assault and unlawful possession of firearms at his parents' house. He was shot after pointing a gun at the officers.
1976-04-16	N.N.		Bonn	Nordrhein-Westfalen	A youth was shot and killed by police.
1976-04-22	N.N.	29	Friedrichshafen	Baden-Württemberg	A man was threatening to kill his wife and child with a knife at a camping site. While police surrounded his tent, officers fired on the man after he non-fatally stabbed his child.
1976-05-07	Sippel, Fritz	22	Dreieich	Hessen	A girl wrongly identified a man in a group of five at a lake in Sprendlingen as an exhibitionist in a police call. During an attempted arrest of the man, two of his friends started a shootout with six police officers which ended with one officer dead from shots in the neck and stomach and the group, later linked to the RAF, on the run. Two known criminals were arrested two weeks later, one of whom admitted to being an RAF affiliate and acknowledged having been the man being arrested, but did not identify the other arrested suspect as one of the shooters, with both being cleared of homicide charges when forensic analysis revealed that the officer had been accidentally shot by a colleague, 23-year-old Rolf Korol. His death is still counted as a killing by the RAF since his death involved their members and typically not ascribed to police.
1976-06-20	Damrijanovic, Stevica	26	Frankfurt am Main	Hessen	A man fled police when a routine traffic stop revealed that he was carrying forged documents. After being apprehended at a bar, he injured a police officer with a broken beer glass and was shot after again attempting escape.
1976-06-26	N.N.		Mannheim	Baden-Württemberg	A man was shot and killed by police.
1976-12-26	N.N.	56	Herzebrock	Nordrhein-Westfalen	A former forester threatened a group of teenagers in Oelde with a gun because they were trying to stop him from driving drunk. The man then shot at arriving police and fled back home by car, where he was shot by police when he attempted to open fire again.

1977

Date (YYYY-MM-TT)	Name	Age	Place	State	Summary of events
1977-02-05	Linden, Hans Georg	19	Nürburg	Rheinland-Pfalz	During a biker meet-up at Nürburgring, part of the annual Elefantentreffen motorcycle rally, a plainclothed officer tried to break up a group of around 20 people engaged in a scuffle inside a festival tent, using pepper spray on the crowd before leaving the scene. When he returned, the bikers recognised him and engaged in melee for agitating them, unaware that he was a police officer. Two shots were fired in self-defense, striking an uninvolved teenager nearby. Police initially reported that the deceased was part of the group that attacked the policeman and reported that he had been tested positively for alcohol intoxication without disclosing that the shooting had occurred during a celebration.
1977-02-09	Lichtenberg, Peter	14	Rodenbach	Hesse	Five teenagers were making loud noise while playing inside of an unfinished apartment building. Neighbours alerted the police after they hear screaming. Two officers and their police dog searched the place, during which three of the teens stayed on the upper floor while two, a teenage couple, ran downstairs to flee over a balcony. 25-year-old officer Jürgen Löcher (or Lorcher) was about to walk to the balcony when the teenage boy shut the door on him, hoping to get more time to escape. The officer fired from a distance of one to three meters, hitting the teenager. The bullet pierced his aorta, bounced from a spinal vertebrae and became stuck near the liver. He died a day later at a hospital, where his last words were reportedly "Darf denn die Polizei auf Kinder schießen?" ("Can the police shoot at children?") to his girlfriend. The officers were acquitted of all charges.
1977-02-28	Batos, Joannis	26	Dortmund	Nordrhein-Westfalen	Attendees of a carnival Rosenmontag party called emergency services because a guest had approached the group and told them that he was "putting an end to it, I took 40 pills" ("Ich mache Schluss, ich habe 40 Tabletten genommen"). Despite the group asking for an ambulance and reiterating that the man had insisted that he wasn't drunk, a squad car was sent in instead, who subsequently tried to bring him to the police station. The man resisted, due to which five officers fixated him to the ground, with witnesses stating that the arrest left him with cuts and bruises. He died during the night inside a jail cell from an overdose of sleeping pills he had ingested earlier. Police initially reported that the Greek electrician had been heavily intoxicated and choked to death on his own vomit, with the station's coroner attesting that the deceased's mouth and stomach cavity smelled of alcohol, despite tests showing that his blood alcohol level were zero.
1977-04-13	Schlaudraff, Helmut	43	Lahn	Hessen	A sheep farmer driving on B49 from Idstein to Wetzlar was mistaken for a sheep thief by police due to overlapping, faulty intel. Unmarked patrol vehicles followed the farmer without his knowledge before forcing his truck off the road. Plainclothed officer Peter Biesterfeld then walked up to the vehicle, threw open the door and shot the driver in the neck, killing him instantly. The act was witnessed by the truck's two other passengers. The officer initially claimed he shouted two warnings and that the farmer had caused the discharge by touching his gun while keeping the door shut, but admitted to the true circumstances three weeks later. The officer claimed he accidentally made the weapon ready to fire, despite being a certified sharpshooter and arms instructor. The drastic arrest procedure was explained due the officers being informed that the farmer was "known to police", with the communication failing to specify that this meant that he had previously contacted police over stolen sheep. The shooting was linked to the ongoing manhunt for RAF. The officer in question was sentenced to three months probation.
1977-04-22	Dresler/Dräsler, Eberhard	28	Solingen	Nordrhein-Westfalen	Two armed men carjacked a motorist and passenger. During a subsequent shootout with police, one of the kidnappers was shot and killed.
1977-05-09	Linnemann	62	Wahmbeck	Niedersachsen	During a police raid on a home, two police officers sprayed the mother of the household with chemical mace, causing her death by asphyxiation.
1977-05-28	Nöhling, Peter	31	West Berlin	Berlin	A robbery attempt targeting a Metro office was thwarted by two passing police officers. As the robber shot at police, an employee restrained the robber. The police continued shooting, leading to the death of the robber and the employee and another officer being wounded.
1977-06-27	Al Halawani, Walid	37	West Berlin	Berlin	A Jordanian man was being shadowed by plainclothed police because he was suspected of planning a robbery with two other men. Police officer Lindenblatt tailed the suspect's car and tried to arrest the suspect on a street in Zehlendorf. The man reached for his breast pocket, causing Lindenblatt to fire one shot in the suspect's upper arm, causing his death. The pocket was found to contain a stiletto knife.
1977-07-05	Schlichting, Gustav	34	Bochum	Nordrhein-Westfalen	Police were called after reports came in that Gustav Schlichting of Wattenscheid was damaging his mother's pub with an excavator from his construction company while under the influence of alcohol. By the time two officers arrived, the argument had been resolved by neighbours. Upon seeing the police, Schlichting became agitated and fought both officers in a fistfight inside the pub, leaving all involved bloodied and bruised. According to the family lawyer, after the younger officer retreated back to the squad car, the older of the pair, 38 year-old Dieter Haarmann, who had responded to previous calls involving Schlichting, appeared to follow suit. Schlichting then grabbed a broom and drunkenly waved it in the officers direction in a gesture of anger and mockery. Haarmann proceeded to walk past the car, unholstered his Walther PPK and suddenly turned around, firing one round, hitting Schlichting in the chest, fatally piercing his lungs. Haarmann was charged with involuntary manslaughter.
1977-07-24	Pollaczek, Rudolf	17	Herne	Nordrhein-Westfalen	A teenage general labourer had been thrown out of the house after a drunken argument with his brother. The family called police when the teenager continued to yell at his brother from the courtyard while wielding a knife, threatening to cut the tires of his brother's car. Two officers were sent in, before another two came as backup and later testified they had tried to engage in "amicable talk" when the teenager either lunged at the officers or threatened to do so. He was fatally shot in the left eye by officer Dieter Ahlfänger.
1977-07-XX	N.N.		Schwerte	Nordrhein-Westfalen	A foreign migrant worker died from blunt head trauma in police custody. Police ascribed the death to an accidental fall.
1977-08-06	Kirmizi, Sadat	20	München	Bayern	A Turkish migrant worker headed for Garmisch was accidentally shot in the head by officer Klaus Hanisch after a traffic stop for speeding. Despite the ruling, Hanisch claimed that the man had reached for his gun, apparently after tripping, and thus caused the discharge.
1977-09-26	N.N.	16	Walsrode	Niedersachsen	A teenager previously known for youth delinquency was shot while attempting to flee from authorities after a botched burglary.
1977-10-12	S., Alfred	25	Königsbronn	Baden-Württemberg	A wanted man resisted arrest from a taskforce inside his apartment. After producing a handgun and firing a shot, the officers returned fire and killed the offender.
1977-10-14	N.N.	18	Seesen	Niedersachsen	At a court hearing, the defendant attempted escape from the building. A judicial officer attempted to stop him, claiming that he was aiming for the defendant's legs, but he was instead fatally shot in the torso.
1977-10-28	N.N.		Kaiserslautern	Rheinland-Pfalz	A bank robber was shot nine times while fleeing from authorities after he pulled out a gun during the chase.
1977-10-18	Harb, Nabil	23	Mogadishu	Banaadir, Somalia	Lufthansa Flight 181: On 13 October, four members of the Popular Front for the Liberation of Palestine hijacked, taking the 87 passengers and five crew members hostage. The militants demanded the release of eleven RAF leaders from West German prisons. Repeated negotiations failed during landing in various locations and the plane's captain Jürgen Schumann was murdered by the leading militant on 16 October. On 18 October, while grounded at Mogadishu International Airport, GSG 9 launched a rescue effort, dubbed Operation Feuerzauber. During the gunfight, all four hostage takers were shot, killing three of them, leaving one, Souhaila Andrawes, surviving. Four hostages were injured.
1977-10-18	Duaibes Yousouf, Nadja Shehadah	22	Mogadishu	Banaadir, Somalia	
1977-10-18	Akache, Zohair Youssif	23	Mogadishu	Banaadir, Somalia	
1977-11-02	Heitkämper, H.J.	33	Dortmund	Nordrhein-Westfalen	A bank robber was shot during a hostage situation after dousing a female employee in ethanol and threatening to set her on fire.
1977-11-02	Rescher, Udo Rolf	33	Frankfurt am Main	Hessen	A man was identified as a wanted burglar during a security check of his person. The man pulls out a gun and attempts to shoot the officer conducting the check, leading to a fire exchange that ends with the man fatally shot.
1977-11-04	N.N.	20	Bonn	Nordrhein-Westfalen	Two GSG 9 officers posted outside the villa property of foreign minister Hans-Dietrich Genscher in Gronau mishandled their weapons by playing a game of quick draw, leading to a misfire that killed one of the officers.
1977-11-10	Kronthaler		Langweid	Bayern	During an attempt to seize several firearms from a gun collector, two officers were injured when the owner fired at them with a revolver before other officers were able to shoot him.

1978

Date (YYYY-MM-TT)	Name	Age	Place	State	Summary of events
1978-01-07	Beinert, Klaus	24	Frankfurt am Main	Hessen	During a physical argument inside a stairwell, 50-year-old police officer Karl Eppstein, who was intoxicated at the time, shot an automechanic in Riederwald out visiting friends after feeling that his "peace had been disturbed". Eppstein later denied being drunk, instead alleging that the automechanic had been and that his death was self-defense. Further investigation was suspended.
1978-02-18	N.N.	37	Aachen	Nordrhein-Westfalen	A 31-year-old policeman accidentally shot an innkeeper during a taxi inspection.
1978-03-30	Reuker, Walter	23	Limburg	Hessen	Two burglars were caught during a kiosk break-in. When two police officers ordered the men to exit the hut with their hands up, one of the burglars shot and injured 31-year-old officer Wolfgang Lieber, who returned fire and hit the shooter in the left hand and chest, killing him. The remaining 19-year-old burglar surrendered after back-up arrived and a warning shot was fired, which hit him in the hand while a third 20-year-old accomplice acting as a getaway driver was arrested nearby. Lieber died of his injuries the same day at a hospital. The deceased from Hundsangen had a long criminal record and was a suspected serial burglar and robber.
1978-04-08	Müller, Klaus	34	Hamburg	Hamburg	A bank robber was shot after escaping the scene with a taxi and holding a police officer hostage. It was discovered that the robber was using a gas pistol.
1978-04-XX	N.N.		Krefeld	Nordrhein-Westfalen	A police officer shot and killed his father-in-law.
1978-08-15	Liebig, Heinrich	29	Darmstadt	Hessen	Police were called to a domestic incident involving a woman and her child being harassed by her separated husband. Upon their arrival, the husband threatened to kill his child with a knife, leading to an altercation between him and two officers, during which a police sidearm discharged and killed the husband.
1978-09-06	Stoll, Willy Peter	28	Düsseldorf	Nordrhein-Westfalen	Member of the RAF. Willy Peter Stoll was visiting a restaurant when he was recognized by another guest, who then informed the police. Several police units surrounded the building. Two officers in plain clothes entered the restaurant, pretending to order a meal. When they confronted him, he tried to reach for his gun and was shot four times. He died before reaching the hospital.
1978-10-08	Knoll, Michael	21	Dortmund	Nordrhein-Westfalen	Member of the RAF. Michael Knoll and two other RAF terrorists, Angelika Speitel and Werner Lotze who were practising shooting in a forest when staggered by the police. In the ensuing shootout, Knoll was injured and died two weeks later. Police officer Hans-Wilhelm Hansen also suffered fatal injuries.
1978-10-19	Leupold, Peter	31	Amberg	Bayern	As police attempted to arrest a man in his apartment, he began threatening the officers with a gas pistol through a locked door. Police shot through the door and killed the man.
1978-11-17	Böttrich, Ulf	33	Soltau	Niedersachsen	A truck driver unknowingly attempted to leave an area under police observation. Police signalled him to stop with several warning shots. When he exited his vehicle, an officer claimed his submachine gun accidentally discharged, hitting the truck driver, who died from his injuries in December.
1978-12-18	N.N.	23	München	Bayern	An inmate managed to grab a judicial officer's pistol and beat him to the ground with it. A firefight ensued when other judicial officers responded, eventually fatally wounding the inmate.

1979

Date (YYYY-MM-TT)	Name	Age	Place	State	Summary of events
1979-01-31	Kontsoudopoulos, Athanasios	22	Hamburg/Wentorf bei Hamburg	Hamburg/Schleswig-Holstein	A burglar armed with a handgun was shot 16 times at the scene of the break-in. The number of shots was explained due to darkness.
1979-02-02	Odinzow, Wladimir Iwanowitsch	18	Seeburg	Bezirk Potsdam	Volkspolizei were conducting a manhunt for an armed Soviet Army deserter, who was likely heading for West Berlin. The same night, two officers spotted a Soviet soldier walking in direction of the border and fired a warning shot after he did not react to a command in Russian. A second warning shot caused the soldier to duck into the snow, at which point he followed most of the officers' commands to walk towards them and show them the inside of his uniform. When the soldier again ran, this time away from the border, the superior of the officers ordered the other to open fire, fatally striking the soldier in the back. It turned out that the deceased was a different off-duty soldier, reportedly to go drinking at the border village. The actual deserter was caught a few hours later.
1979-02-21	Hoffmann, Erwin	43	Bamberg	Bayern	Police approached two suspected thieves for an arrest when one brandished an iron bar at them. A warning shot was fired and after the thief did not desist, he was fatally shot twice.
1979-04-30	Drindl, Manfred	27	Landshut	Bayern	SEK shot and killed an armed bank robber during a negotiated handoff of ransom money to end a hostage situation that 100 local officers, 50 special commandos, an EHU unit, K-9 units, a psychological team and a negotiation group from Munich attended to. Officers snuck into the teller station through a back door and shot the robber from behind.
1979-05-04	von Dyck, Elisabeth	28	Nürnberg	Bayern	Member of the RAF. Elisabeth von Dyck was shot in the back when she tried to pull out her holstered gun, after encountering police officers in her apartment.
1979-05-07	Mettbach, Karl	53	Hagen	Nordrhein-Westfalen	A businessman from Hamburg was under police observation since they believed that he had bought a stolen car from a friend with suspected affiliation to Romani criminal gangs; the men were Sinti and Roma respectively. Plainclothed officers had tailed the man to a visit to his friend's house, and decided to put him under arrest when he returned to the property upon realizing he was being followed. During the arrest an officer trained his gun on him to "keep him in check" and as the man was being ordered to turn around, he was shot in the forehead when the gun discharged by accident. The deceased's daughter, who was in the car during the arrest, his friend, and police officers testified that he had been compliant during the entire arrest and that the shot occurred at a distance of around 50 cm.
1979-05-17	Wichert, Maximilian	35	München	Bayern	During an arrest, the man in question reached into his jacket pocket, and suspecting he was pulling out a weapon, the Kripo officers fatally shot him. It was determined that the man hadn't been carrying a weapon of any kind, but the death was still ruled self-defense.
1979-08-05	Rabe, Wilfried	43	Oldenburg	Niedersachsen	Police were alerted to a supermarket after an automatic alarm system tipped them off about an ongoing break-in. As a 39-year-old officer rounded a corner to the back of the business, he encountered two men, one holding a gas pistol. The officer immediately fired three shots at the duo, hitting the unarmed man in the shoulder and fatally striking the man with the gun in the forehead. It was found that the deceased was the owner of the supermarket, who had arrived after receiving a pre-recorded message from his alarm system, shortly after police, and was looking for the burglars accompanied by his 21-year-old son, an off-duty Bremen Police officer. The "burglars" are presumed to have left the premises during the commotion, abandoning their loot, a single crate of expired beer that had been left outside for garbage pick-up, in a nearby dumpster.
1979-09-13	Probst, Peter	31	West Berlin	Berlin	Police attempted to apprehend a bank robber in a taxi on a parking lot and fired deadly shots when he allegedly reached for his gun and threw a hand grenade at the officers.
1979-12-18	Schmidt, Rainer	29	West Berlin	Berlin	The second-in-command of a gang of robbers nicknamed the "Hammerbande" was shot while attempting to hold up an armored bank transporter in Schöneberg and died of his wounds almost two months later on 8 February 1980. Together with his brother-in-law Klaus-Dieter L., he stole 3,2 million DM in at least eight other bank transporter robberies. L. was sentenced to 15 years imprisonment and was rearrested in 2005 for robbing another bank transporter with his adult son before being tried again in 2012 for fatally wounding a security guard during a robbery in 1992.
1979-12-18	Waschtschenko, Wjatscheslaw	42	München	Bayern	A Ukrainian in-exile journalist diagnosed with schizophrenia and depression, formerly employed by the local branch of the U.S.-funded Radio Liberty, barricaded himself in his mother's apartment in Ludwigsfeld when he was supposed to be brought to a psychiatric facility in Haar, where he had been remanded to in the past. Since police noted that he had violently resisted as well as issued suicide threats during previous commitments, SEK was called in. Three officers stormed the premises and one shot the man four times because he was wielding an axe, dying at the scene.

=== 1980s ===
1980

Date (YYYY-MM-TT)	Name	Age	Place	State	Summary of events
1980-02-21	Heidtmann, Kurt	41	Buxtehude	Niedersachsen	Police engaged in a car chase after a motorist suspected of speeding did not stop at command. During the pursuit, the man opened fire with a submachine gun, after which police fired two gunshots in self-defense, one fatally striking the motorist.
1980-02-27	Eggebrecht, Andreas	22	West Berlin	Berlin	Two MEK officers overheard a fight happening inside a brothel bar in Charlottenburg and found two drunk customers, a father-son pair, kicking the owner on the ground with heavy boots. The officers were then beaten by the men with metal chair legs, knocking one of them unconscious, forcing the remaining officer, 28-year-old Horst G., to use deadly force. He emptied his entire magazine, with a stray shot injuring his downed colleague as well. The officer reportedly received death threats from friends of the deceased and went on permanent sick leave as a result.
1980-02-27	Eggebrecht, Erwin	47	West Berlin	Berlin	
1980-03-17	N.N.	19	Zweibrücken	Rheinland-Pfalz	A prisoner held in remand took another inmate hostage with a bladed weapon and demanded to be released. While crossing the prison yard, he was killed by a police marksman in what was deemed a "typical fatal shot", meaning the knowingly deadly usage of a firearm was used as no other means were available/had been exhausted.
1980-04-03	Perder, Manfred	43	Neuss	Nordrhein-Westfalen	A VW bus with three occupants was stopped for a road check at a scheduled checkpoint. As the vehicle was slowing down, 33-year-old MEK officer Peter U. fired a single shot at the car's windshield with his submachine gun, hitting the driver, an acoustic panel manufacturer from Essen, in his lip, piercing the palate and fatally hitting the medulla. Allegedly the driver did not stop his vehicle fast enough and the officer reacted "in a reflex motion". He avoided direct questioning with a doctor's note. The shooting was prominently reported on amidst similar alleged misconduct during the national RAF manhunt. The officer was sentenced to seven months probation.
1980-05-04	N.N.	51	München	Bayern	Two burglars broke into the front garden at the weekend house of a 30-year-old police officer. The owner caught them in the act and opened fire with his service pistol after they ran at him with crowbars, killing one of burglars. The officer had been scoping out the house after several previous break-in.
1980-06-05	N.N.	50	Herford	Nordrhein-Westfalen	As police attempted to apprehend a burglar, the suspect used a pistol to fire twice at the officers, who return fire, killing him. The pistol turned out to be a blank gun.
1980-06-09	Ahyan, Necmettin	17	Mannheim	Baden-Württemberg	A Turkish teenager broke into a restaurant. He was immediately spotted by two police officers, who followed him inside and found the burglar hiding behind a curtain. Five gunshots were fired by the officers, four hitting the boy, one proving fatal by piercing the heart. Police claimed self-defense.
1980-06-25	N.N.	38	Kapellen-Drusweiler	Rheinland-Pfalz	A burglar was shot by police while attempting to break into a Raiffeisenbank.
1980-06-26	G., Ishan		Frankfurt am Main	Hessen	A drug dealer was shot while he is arrested and died in custody four weeks later.
1980-07-01	Friebel, Peter	39	Würzburg	Bayern	On 30 June, a man walked into an American Express bank within the grounds of the Leighton Barracks with a concealed gun and took two hostages, 49-year-old loan officer Melvin L. Cochran and 35-year-old SFC Buddy Davis, both American nationals. A cleaning lady who had been in the basement at the time of the stick-up was able to escape. The hostage-taker, who identified himself as "Sergeant Willi Plett", was an American soldier with a German father, demanded 1.4 million U.S. dollars, a getaway vehicle and a flight to an undisclosed country from police for the hostages' safety. After 16 hours of negotiations with German police and U.S. Army officials, the robber was shot three times by a SEK sniper. Both hostages were left unharmed, with Cochran, an Ozark, Alabama native, remaining in Würzburg and Davis returning to Salt Lake City. Major General Sam Wetzel had given the go-ahead for the marksman to fire on the robber, as a "fatal shot".
1980-09-07	N.N.	46	Bremen	Bremen	A jurist with a known history of mental illness and violence was shot after he non-fatally stabbed a police officer.
1980-10-03	Moysiszik, Detlef	19	Aachen	Nordrhein-Westfalen	Ten police officers were involved in a sting operation after being tipped off about a planned jewelry robbery. A 21-year-old accomplice had informed the authorities of the crime five hours in advance and the fact that he and the other perpetrator would be armed with harmless gas pistols, for which he received lenience for violating parole and a 100 DM reward. Eight plainclothed officers monitored the scene as the robber and the accomplice entered the empty store, where two uniformed officers were to perform the arrest. The robber was instead once shot in the chest moments after police revealed themselves. The 36-year-old officer was put on trial as there was no dangerous situation that would have warranted deadly force but he was later cleared of all charges.
1980-10-24	Marx, Dietmar	19	West Berlin	Berlin	Two police officers gained entry to an apartment in Kreuzberg, waiting for the return of the owner, who was wanted for theft. The arrest was bungled when a 58-year-old officer shot another man who entered under unclear circumstances; the man was not the home owner they were expecting, but a previously unknown roommate, also suspected of theft. The deceased had been at a police station for questioning earlier that day. The officer who fired the killing shots was ordered by the court to pay a fine of 4000 DM.
1980-12-11	Tinz, Erwin	57	Nackenheim	Rheinland-Pfalz	A homeless man was arrested at his sleeping spot outside of a theater in Mainz for harassing guests while drunk. He was driven out of the city without his crutches and other belongings, subsequently being dropped off at a rural road during cold temperatures. He died less than two hours later from heart failure. The three involved officers were charged with negligent homicide, though two were ultimately only fined for deprivation of liberty in 1981.
1980-12-22	Golombek, Werner Karl	41	Hanau	Hessen	35-year-old police officer Martin Robert Müller got into a fight with the alleged lover of his unfaithful wife on a street. During the struggle, Müller shot his opponent eight times with his service weapon. A court convicted the officer of manslaughter in 1982 and 1984, after an investigation showed that the deceased had attacked Müller first, rendering the killing self-defence, but emphasised that Müller had less lethal means to subdue the unarmed and physically weaker man. He received sentences of eight and a half years and five years in each instance.
1980-12-31	Schroer, Rolf	31 or 62	Saarbrücken	Saarland	A miner's wife called the police, claiming her husband had barricaded himself in the apartment and was threatening to "shoot anything that moved". Upon arrival, the man was ordered to show himself and ended up being fatally shot by five officers. However, it was revealed that the man was unarmed and there were doubts about both the initial threat and the statement that police were attacked. The wife was suspected of knowingly misrepresenting the situation to have her husband killed and investigated for conspiracy to murder.

1981

Date (YYYY-MM-TT)	Name	Age	Place	State	Summary of events
1981-01-23	Köhler, Wilfried	32	Düsseldorf	Nordrhein-Westfalen	Two police officers found a man who did not return after his prison furlough helping his wife move out of her apartment. When the man threatened suicide with a knife, the police deployed tear gas, at which point the man attempted to flee. Officer Karl-Heinz R. opened fire from a distance of two meters, killing the man. The officer was initially charged with negligent homicide, but ended up being relieved of all charges.
1981-03-18	Schecke, Uwe	30	Bielefeld	Nordrhein-Westfalen	In a case of mistaken identity, a printer from Hamburg was falsely apprehended by police as an illegal watch dealer and during the arrest on a parking lot, officer Wolfgang J. claimed he tripped and accidentally discharged the machine gun he was holding. The arrestee was fatally struck in the temple. The incident was labelled a "tragic case of misfortune" and the officers weren't charged.
1981-06-15	Berger, Alfons	37	Ludwigsmoos	Bayern	Police were on a manhunt for two brothers suspected of a failed bomb plot targeting two police officers in Weißenburg in May 1981. During an observation of one brother's house, the inhabitant exited holding a long metal object and following a confrontation, he was shot from a distance of 2 metres. Said object was found to be a loaded hunting rifle, but as it was wrapped in plastic, it could not have been fired in its current state. The other brother was arrested in a Munich restaurant the same day.
1981-06-25	Kruggel, Ruth	52	Rosenheim	Bayern	Police were called to a rent dispute, as the indebted tenant was refusing to let the landlord inside. The woman, suspected of being mentally ill, fired two gunshots through the door, killing 44-year-old officer Fritz Hellmis as he was picking the lock. The woman shot and injured several officers more before she was killed by special commando forces.
1981-08-14	Stolz, Dirk	27	Saarbrücken	Saarland	A motorist tried to avoid a traffic stop and was subsequently shot by attending police. The officer in question was tried for a less serious case of manslaughter, but found not guilty on grounds of self-defense.
1981-09-12	N.N.	53	Troisdorf	Nordrhein-Westfalen	A locksmith and hobby gardener was shot five times after a patrol officer came to "see if everything was right" on the gardener's allotment. The gardener had refused the officer entry and tried to forcefully eject him from the property. The officer states that a "threat scenario" had arisen when the gardener pointed his spade at him, forcing him to use deadly force. The gardener died at a hospital and the charges against the officers were dropped due to a lack of witnesses.
1981-09-29	Neu, E.	45	West Berlin	Berlin	A motorist sped off during a traffic stop and was shot after he had brought the vehicle to a halt. The officer was found guilty of involuntary manslaughter and sentenced to 6 months including probation and a fine of 6000 DM in the first instance and 1 year with probation in the second.
1981-10-20	Wolfgram, Kurt Eduard	21	München	Bayern	In Ramersdorf-Perlach, five members of the neo-Nazi Volkssozialistische Bewegung Deutschlands/Partei der Arbeit opened fire and detonated a frag grenade as they were being arrested for planning a bank robbery, injuring one officer with shrapnel. The officers retaliated by shooting two of the gang members, during which another officer was hit by a stray bullet. Immediately after, the other three robbers, two Germans and a French national, were arrested, as was party leader Friedhelm Busse.
1981-10-20	Uhl, Klaus Ludwig	24	München	Bayern	In Ramersdorf-Perlach, five members of the neo-Nazi Volkssozialistische Bewegung Deutschlands/Partei der Arbeit opened fire and detonated a frag grenade as they were being arrested for planning a bank robbery, injuring one officer with shrapnel. The officers retaliated by shooting two of the gang members, during which another officer was hit by a stray bullet. Immediately after, the other three robbers, two Germans and a French national, were arrested, as was party leader Friedhelm Busse.
1981-10-22	Severino, Vincenzo		Schwäbisch Gmünd	Baden-Württemberg	MEK were observing two Italian brothers-in-law in Ebersbach, believing that they were supplying a recently released drug dealer with narcotics. On arrival at the meeting site in another town, three MEK vehicles stopped the car without incident, but because the passenger, who was previously convicted of hashish and heroin sales, was reportedly known for being armed, the officers opened the door with their sidearms drawn, shouting the occupants to exit. A gunshot then discharged from the weapon of officer Klaus-Jürgen B., striking the passenger in the left shoulder blade from behind and passing through to get struck in the driver's right wrist. The passenger died at the scene despite first aid. No drugs were found in the car or at the men's apartments. Neither were armed and the surviving brother-in-law testified that the deceased had not made any sudden moves, also saying that there may have been two gunshots. The officer was tried for manslaughter, but cleared of all charges.
1981-10-26	Klatt, René Douglas	43	Neustadt an der Weinstraße	Rheinland-Pfalz	A previously convicted drug courier was wanted by Erkelenz police for shooting and injuring two customs officers in Waldfeucht on the Dutch-German border. Following widespread acknowledgement of the suspect through the TV program Aktenzeichen XY... ungelöst, an informant told police that the suspect was at the train station of Neustadt with two other men. Upon the attempted arrest, the suspect pushed two women as a distraction before opening fire on officers. He was shot three times during the shootout, dying at a hospital the same day. His two companions, residents of Bruchsal, were arrested without incident.
1981-12-06	N.N.	27	Fürth	Bayern	A bank robber was shot as he fled with the loot he had obtained with a gas pistol. The robber was given a warning shot before being gunned down.
1981-12-31	Mardini, A.	24	West Berlin	Berlin	A plainclothed officer conducting a personnel check in a local bar shot and killed a man who threatened him with a knife.
1981-XX-XX	N.N.		Hamburg	Hamburg	A police officer accidentally shot and killed a sleeping man at a bar in St. Pauli.
1981-XX-XX	3 killed				IMK statistics list 17 fatal police shootings, of which only 13 were given detailed reports.

1982

Date (YYYY-MM-TT)	Name	Age	Place	State	Summary of events
1982-04-15	Skrabo, Jandrio	31	Hofheim	Hessen	Police officers shot a Croat burglar armed with a gun after a fire exchange.
1982-04-21	N.N.	30	Wesel	Nordrhein-Westfalen	A bank robber was shot after he fired at the arriving officers.
1982-05-30	N.N.	31	Aachen	Nordrhein-Westfalen	A driving instructor fled from authorities after refusing to stop his car. He was shot after he crashed into a patrol car.
1982-06-27	Jungling, G.	33	Ortenberg	Baden-Württemberg	Police were called to the supposed site of a break-in, but the home owner denied any suspicious activity and tried to forcefully usher the officers out. During the ensuing scuffle, a police firearm discharged, killing the home owner.
1982-07-28	N.N.	29	Frankfurt am Main	Hessen	A Gambian man was shot while holding another person at knifepoint.
1982-08-21	N.N.	36	Wuppertal	Nordrhein-Westfalen	A judicial officer committed a bank robbery and held three people hostage with a machine gun. One of the hostages, an off-duty police officer, managed to shoot and kill the robber.
1982-10-12	N.N.	24	Tuttlingen	Baden-Württemberg	During an attempted house search, one of the officers attempted to keep the door wedged open with his side-arm, causing it to discharge and kill the resident. The officer was found guilty of involuntary manslaugther and paid a fine of 6500 DM.
1982-11-09	Campagna, Pio	58	Frankfurt am Main	Hessen	Two police officers entered a construction container office after they saw a figure inside to be a trespasser. The man inside, really an Italian carpenter serving as the site's foreman, mistook the officers for burglars and threatened them with an axe, for which police shot and killed him. The prosecutor's office launched a probe into the death but ceased their investigation shortly after.
1982-11-21	Piber, Andreas	18	West Berlin	Berlin	Responding to a case of attempted burglary at a second-hand shop in Schöneberg, 26-year-old police officer Jörg Rosentreter fatally shot the student and suspected thief in the back. Rosentreter admitted that he had done this "aimlessly" as it was dark and he was convicted of negligent homicide for which he was sentenced to a total of 3 years and 6 months.
1982-12-15	Sander, Friedrich	52	Wiefelstede	Niedersachsen	A farmer is fatally shot after he threatened police with a revolver when they came to enforce a public health officer's order for involuntary commitment to a mental institution. The gun turned out to be unloaded.

1983

Date (YYYY-MM-TT)	Name	Age	Place	State	Summary of events
1983-01-06	N.N.		Köln	Nordrhein-Westfalen	A bank robber was killed in a shootout after police raid the location. One officer was shot in the hand.
1983-01-23	G., Hans-Joachim	26	Hamburg	Hamburg	A burglar ran away from police while pointing a pistol at his pursuers. He was shot by MEK, who discover that his gun was non-operational. Public prosecution investigated, but no one was charged.
1983-02-17	N.N.	18	Ditzingen	Baden-Württemberg	A robbery suspect was shot dead after he shot at Kripo officers with a gas pistol at point blank range, leading to eye injury.
1983-03-05	Heins, Alfons "Alf"	18	Hamburg	Hamburg	42-year-old plainclothed police officer Dieter Lücke spotted two teenagers on a parking lot in Lurup, shining a flashlight into cars. The pair was looking for a distinctive stereo that would identify a car that had been stolen from one, but Lücke, assuming both to be car thieves, surprised them and put both under arrest. One of them was shot in the head from a close distance, with the exact circumstances of the incident being unclear. The officer asserted that he was restraining one of the teenagers when he attempted to flee while aiming his gun at the other, during which he accidentally pulled the trigger. The surviving teenager instead claimed that the officer had roughly shoved his friend with the barrel of the gun, during which the shot was fired. It was noted either way that the deceased, having stood 1,60 m and weighing 48 kg, would not have been perceived as threatening. The officer was sentenced to two years imprisonment.
1983-03-07	Kaiser, Joachim	19	Augsburg	Bayern	Three drunk teenagers from Wertingen drove through a pedestrian crossing in Ulrichsplatz. Police officers shot at least 22 times at the car, killing the driver. It was later determined that police fired with intent to kill after falsely concluding the occupants were firing at the officers, having mistaken a colleague's muzzle flash for an impacting bullet aimed at them. None of the police's gunshots hit the tires and one had struck the window of a nearby three-story flat.
1983-03-18	Wilck, Florian	63	Neuss	Nordrhein-Westfalen	A retiree who was known to police for mental issues called emergency services to request a police patrol, a common occurrence. He was shot by the officers when he greeted them holding a rifle. The weapon was later found to be an air rifle.
1983-03-20	Bergbauer, Jürgen	14	Gauting	Bayern	30 year-old police officer Friedrich Konzack was on night patrol, because of an ongoing series of burglaries. The officer spotted a "young male figure", later identified as Jürgen Bergbauer, use a lit phone booth before entering a youth center and called for two officers as backup. When the figure passed by a window, the officer fired three shots, the last of which struck the teenager in the head, instantly killing him. Bergbauer had snuck away from home to attend a party and wanted to sleep at the center to avoid a confrontation with his mother. Konzack later testified he had mistaken the boy for the suspected burglar after being startled, despite having had a clear view of Bergbauer when he used the payphone and the boy standing only 150 cm (4 ft 11 in). Konzack was sentenced to 6 months probation and forced to pay a fine of 3500 DM.
1983-03-22	N.N.	43	Übersee	Bayern	An innkeeper who had shot his girlfriend in a fit of jealousy, was killed in a gunfight he started with responding Kripo.
1983-03-29	N.N.	21	Ötisheim	Baden-Württemberg	A plainclothed police patrol in Pforzheim found that a car with three men inside was matched to a stolen vehicle in Durmersheim. Three patrols cars engaged the vehicle in a car chase over B10. After breaking through a police barrier and over rail lines, the car stopped on an industrial grounds, where the occupants hid behind a stack of wood. When officers ordered them to surrender, one of the men, a Turkish man from Schwäbisch Hall, fired a gas pistol at police. Two warning shots were fired by police and because the car thieves refused to give up, officers returned fire, hitting the shoulder of the shooter, who died at the scene.
1981-03-31	N.N.	50	Darmstadt	Hessen	A man threatened police officers with a submachine gun. He was fatally shot while fleeing the scene.
1983-06-04	N.N.	30	Oberhausen	Nordrhein-Westfalen	Two fugitives barricaded themselves in an apartment and open fire on police. During the shootout, one SEK officer was critically injured after being shot in the neck, while one of the suspects is fatally shot.
1983-06-29	F., Manfred	33	Castrop-Rauxel	Nordrhein-Westfalen	A burglar was shot by the responding officer during a break-in due to the suspect holding an unidentified object in his hand.
1983-08-03	Hahn, Michael	38	Hamburg	Hamburg	A man was shot by a police patrol that had caught him attempting to break into a building. He was armed with a gas pistol.
1983-08-07	N.N.	52	Bergisch Gladbach	Nordrhein-Westfalen	During a burglary at a villa, police shot the offender when he charged at the officers with a crowbar.
1983-08-25	N.N.	22	Düsseldorf	Nordrhein-Westfalen	Police were called to a dormitory after receiving reports of a knife-wielding masked man skulking around the courtyard. The man, a student, was shot dead when he attempts to flee.
1983-08-25	Freundt, Gerhard	26	Wesseling	Nordrhein-Westfalen	A drunk cyclist collided with 36-year-old plainclothed police officer Klaus Leinenbach, driving his private vehicle and carrying a private weapon. A 20-second confrontation ensued, during which the officer shot the cyclist in the heart. The deceased's wife witnessed the altercation and shooting, attesting that Leinenbach never identified himself as a police officer. The officer received 8 months in prison when it was determined that he had escalated the situation by immediately taking out his gun, but the sentence was reversed by a federal court.
1983-09-28	Miller, Karl-Heinz	20	Augsburg	Bayern	A group of four men attempted a drive-by shooting on a civilian police car, presumably targeting a single plainclothed officer who was later found not to have been their intended target. Two officers were injured and returning fire killed two of the attackers.
1983-09-28	Miller, Peter	19	Augsburg	Bayern	A group of four men attempted a drive-by shooting on a civilian police car, presumably targeting a single plainclothed officer who was later found not to have been their intended target. Two officers were injured and returning fire killed two of the attackers.
1983-09-29	Delahaye, Karl	40	Alsdorf	Nordrhein-Westfalen	Police responded to a bank robbery in Hoengen. When the two robbers left the bank with two hostages, the officers opened fire on the getaway car with several weapons, including fully automatic submachine guns. Although the robbers were wearing masks and their hostages did not, the officers failed to think of the possibility of them being hostages. In the result, hostage Mertens died at the scene, hostage Delahaye one month later, bank robber Erwin Naujoks was paralyzed, and bank robber Wolfgang Vobis was severely injured. Three officers, the two shooters and a look-out who failed to adequately inform his colleagues, were charged with negligent homicide and in 1986, they were given prison sentences ranging between 6 and 10 months.
1983-09-29	Mertens, Alfred	25	Alsdorf	Nordrhein-Westfalen	
1983-11-02	Behl, Peter	25	Hanau	Hessen	Following a noise complaint, police arrived at an apartment to find three men and three women, all heavily drunk. Officers noticed one of the women had a bleeding head wound and were in the process of questioning them, when one of the men pulled out a gun and rioted in the apartment before hiding in a room. After repeatedly threatening to open fire on the officers, he was shot 12 times through the locked door. His gun was later found to be a gas pistol.
1983-11-08	Sahm, Hardon	28	Bad Wildungen	Hessen	On 5 November, four convicts escaped from Villingen prison after luring a guard into a cell, beating him, and locking him away after taking his keys. Three days later, police were informed that four suspicious men were at a restaurant in a nearby town. During a feigned ID check, an arrest attempt was made, during which two of the convicts opened fire on officers. One convict, a bank robber from Furtwangen who was described as the ringleader, is killed in the shootout, another heavily wounded, while an uninvolved child was also seriously injured.

1984

Date (YYYY-MM-TT)	Name	Age	Place	State	Summary of events
1984-01-09	Salah, Sami	22	München	Bayern	Police were called to a bar in Ludwigsvorstadt, after the owner reported that a bargirl was threatened by a drunk client, a German man of Arab descent from Köln, wielding a gun. The patron pointed his weapon at two responding officers, who each fired one shot at the man, killing him. The gun was found to be loaded with less-than-lethal blanks and gas ammunition
1984-01-18	N., Karl-Heinz	40	Hamburg	Hamburg	Plainclothed police spotted two men attempting to break into a tobacco shop. After being surprised by the officers, one of the burglars fled while the other charged at an officer and hit him in the head with a hammer. The attacked officer shot multiple times in return, killing the burglar.
1984-03-28	N.N.	32	Eschlkam	Bayern	Two Bavarian Border Police officers attempted to conduct an alcohol test on a farmer suspected of causing a traffic accident. He was heavily resisting with his hands and a broom before he was struck by two shots in the chest when an officer's gun accidentally discharged. The farmer died 15 minutes later at the scene. The officer who fired the weapon lost an index finger during the incident.
1984-04-01	R., Uwe	21	Ravensburg	Baden-Württemberg	Police responded to a domestic incident at a private residence, when a man was reported by his roommates for physically threatening them. The drunk man aimed an unloaded gas pistol at the officers and was shot while he attempted to flee the scene.
1984-05-03	Pfitzer, Siegfried	47	Marbach am Neckar	Baden-Württemberg	Victim of police officer, bank robber and serial killer Norbert Poehlke. Poehlke killed Pfitzer with a headshot from his service pistol and used his victim's car as a getaway-vehicle.
1984-07-01	W., Klaus Peter	39	Dormagen	Nordrhein-Westfalen	A drunk driver brushed against two parked cars and ran a red light in Köln. As two officers got the driver to stop and next to the driver's side, a 21-year-old officer's firearm went off after he was pushed by his partner. The man was hit in the neck through the lowered side window and killed instantly. The officer was given a 500 DM fine and probation. Why the gun was pulled and pointed at the driver remains unclear.
1984-10-07	F., Mike	16	Einbeck	Niedersachsen	Two teenagers, convicted of property-related offenses, escaped Jugendanstalt Hameln and stole a car. They were spotted by police in Osterode, who pursued the teenagers on B243. In Greene, the teenage suspects rammed against the side of a police car, lightly injuring the officers inside and forcing a passing car off the road into a ditch. An officer subsequently fired his submachine gun four or five times, hitting the trunk of the car. One bullet passed into the car's interior and fatally struck one of the youths in the heart. The 17-year-old boy beside him suffered a shock, but was apprehended without injury.
1984-12-21	Wethey, Eugene Richard	37	Großbottwar	Baden-Württemberg	Victim of police officer, bank robber and serial killer Norbert Poehlke. Poehlke killed Wethey, an English immigrant, with a headshot from his service pistol and used his victim's car as a getaway-vehicle.
1984-12-27	Karacayli, Cevat	34	Villingen	Baden-Württemberg	Two police officers were dispatched to an apartment building where a Turkish migrant worker was refusing to pay a postal worker an installment for a vacuum cleaner. Under unclear circumstances, the situation escalated, at which point 24-year-old officer Frank Gielser put the resident in a headlock, continuing even as the man's wife pointed out her husband's finger had turned blue from hypoxia. By the time backup arrived 15 minutes later, the officer had unintentionally strangled the suspect to death. Giesler was sentenced to one year imprisonment with probation, while his 22-year-old partner was given a monetary fine for aiding by twisting the deceased's arm.

1985

Date (YYYY-MM-TT)	Name	Age	Place	State	Summary of events
1985-01-19/20	N.N.	37	Oberhausen	Nordrhein-Westfalen	During a nightly home invasion at an inn, police were informed by a witness that the burglar had fled into an adjacent apartment building. During the search, a 22-year-old officer shot an uninvolved resident after being "startled" when the unarmed man suddenly came into view of his flashlight. During his trial, the officer received lenience because the shooting was the result of a fear reaction, also taking into account the officer's "one-of-a-kind honesty", as he admitted that he never felt "directly threatened". The killing resulted in a sentence of 10 months with probation for the offending officer.
1985-03-12	N.N.	48	Langquaid	Bayern	A man called police after feeling threatened by his schizophrenic brother. The farmer barricaded himself in his room, screaming while wielding a hatchet, as he believed the police came to fulfill a state order to have the farmer involuntarily committed to a psychiatric facility, which the officers had not been informed of. Introducing incapacitating agent into the room through a keyhole and attempts to enter through a window failed, after the farmer covered his face and began guarding the window. Officers forced their way in with the consent of the farmer's brother. The farmer charged at police, at which point one officer tried to subdue the attacker from behind, but was kicked in the stomach. The officer then fatally shot the farmer to protect his colleagues and the brother.
1985-03-29	N.N.	45	Würzburg	Bayern	A bank robber stole 33,000 DM in Sanderau by threatening staff with a fake hand grenade. He fled into a nearby restaurant and threatened the owner's 17-year-old daughter to point him to a back entrance, but she was able to flee. Police fired on the robber when he pointed a gun at them, which was found to be a plastic toy.
1985-04-06	N.N.	25	Northeim	Niedersachsen	A motorist attempted to escape the scene of a car crash in Sudheim, breaking through three road blocks. After a 40 km chase, a police vehicle stopped him and a 23-year-old officer approached the driver's side. The motorist was killed by an accidental gun discharge. A court judged that the officer had acted "inarguably wrong" and should not have pulled out the gun for a suspect in a traffic violation. It was decided that the officer was less criminally responsible as he had been overwhelmed by the situation rather than acted out of malice, receiving a 2750 DM fine in 1986, lowered from an initial 3850 DM.
1985-04-18	Rieger, Helmut	33	Ulm	Baden-Württemberg	A drunk police officer shot a fellow officer when he was about to be arrested for a hit-and-run before killing himself.
1985-05-12	N.N.	45	Düsseldorf	Nordrhein-Westfalen	A resident of an apartment complex threatened several other tenants with a gun before locking himself in his own flat. After forceful entry by police, the resident fired two shots from the gun, firing blanks, with the officer fatally shooting him in return.
1985-07-07	N.N.	28	Saarwellingen	Saarland	A man who had murdered a roofer at a restaurant was arrested by police after a foot chase. He was able to get out of his restraints and pulled out a gun, leading to the attending officers fatally shooting the offender.
1985-07-22	Schneider, Wilfried	26	Ilsfeld	Baden-Württemberg	Victim of police officer, bank robber and serial killer Norbert Poehlke. Poehlke killed Schneider with a headshot from his service pistol and used his victim's car as a getaway-vehicle.
1985-08-04	R., Gerhard	62	Langenfeld	Nordrhein-Westfalen	A tenant was subject to court-ordered eviction and involuntary commitment to a psychiatric facility. The separate orders had fallen on the same date and a judge was unwilling to reschedule, despite being informed of the tenant's mental problems. A doctor and a bailiff arrived at the apartment accompanied by police as security to enforce both arrangements. The man had barricaded himself inside and immediately attacked an officer with a fireaxe, then grabbed a knife to charge at the group. Officers were lightly injured and stopped the attacker by fatally shooting him in the chest.
1985-08-06	Minwegen, Lorenz	56	Düsseldorf	Nordrhein-Westfalen	After a night of heavy drinking, two police officers, 27-year-old Wolfgang Liebau and 26-year-old Ralf Voigt, strangled a fellow patron to death with a necktie in a forest bordering Hilden. The officers gave their motive as robbery, saying that the victim had frequented the same bar as the officers and often bragged about his supposed wealth. They were initially tried for murder, which was reduced to robbery resulting in death, with both receiving 13 year sentences.
1985-09-28	Sare, Günter	36	Frankfurt	Hessen	At a demonstration the police used water cannons to diffuse the protesting crowd. Sare was hit by the water stream and injured severely when hitting the ground. He was later run over by the water cannon under unclear circumstances and died.
1985-10-13	Poehlke, Ingeborg	47	Strümpfelbach	Baden-Württemberg	Police officer, bank robber and serial killer Norbert Poehlke murdered his family due to fear of his imminent arrest. At their home, he used his service pistol to kill his wife with two shots to the head on the couch, his older son in his bed with a shot to the head, as well as the family dog. Poehlke fled to Torre Canne in Italy after abducting his younger son, whom he then also killed with a head shot before killing himself.
1985-10-13	Poehlke, Adrian	7	Strümpfelbach	Baden-Württemberg	Police officer, bank robber and serial killer Norbert Poehlke murdered his family due to fear of his imminent arrest. At their home, he used his service pistol to kill his wife with two shots to the head on the couch, his older son in his bed with a shot to the head, as well as the family dog. Poehlke fled to Torre Canne in Italy after abducting his younger son, whom he then also killed with a head shot before killing himself.
1985-10-22	Poehlke, Gabriel	4	Torre Canne	Apulia, Italy	Police officer, bank robber and serial killer Norbert Poehlke murdered his family due to fear of his imminent arrest. At their home, he used his service pistol to kill his wife with two shots to the head on the couch, his older son in his bed with a shot to the head, as well as the family dog. Poehlke fled to Torre Canne in Italy after abducting his younger son, whom he then also killed with a head shot before killing himself.
1985-10-20	Wolkenstein, Klaus-Detlef	33	West Berlin	Berlin	In an emergency call, a suspected burglary was reported in Rudow. Two plainclothed SEK officers searched the area and found a man scaling a fence onto an industrial company near the crime scene. When the officers announced their affiliation and approached the man, he stepped back and pulled out a pocketknife. Both parties stepped back and forwards for several minutes before an officer fired four shots on the suspect, fatally striking him once in the back. It was later found that the deceased had been extremely short-sighted and been drunk from a company party, where he had forgotten his glasses. Investigators presume that he tried to return to the pub the party was held and got lost. Because he could not be certain of the officers' identities due to his poor eyesight, the deceased assumed they were lying about their identities and instead trying to mug him, hence the knife. A self-defence plea was not accepted as the gunshot wound indicated that the deceased was turned away from the officers. The officers, aged 20 and 30, were each fined 5000 DM and 6000 DM to set a precedent for police conduct.

1986

Date (YYYY-MM-TT)	Name	Age	Place	State	Summary of events
1986-01-21	N.N.	20-25	Würzburg	Bayern	A young man robbed a gun store in Sanderau, getting away with two pistols. Employees pursued the thief who threatened to use the weapons during the foot chase. Two officers found the man in a courtyard, where he opened fire without warning, hitting one officer through the leg. The second officer shot the man in the chest, dying of a pierced lung at a hospital an hour later.
1986-01-27	Kureck, Udo	26	Hemmingen	Niedersachsen	A man was vandalising the front yard of a house at night. After being confronted and shot at by the armed homeowner, he ran past him through the unlocked door and hid in the building's cellar, arming himself with a shotgun that was stored there. After the home owner's wife and two children were brought out, SEK surrounded the cellar entrance and tried to negotiate with the man for the next two and a half hours while wielding riot shield. The man refused to lay down the firearm, claiming that the officers would "torture him to the bone" and "steal his personality", threatening to "shoot all policemen dead" before he stopped responding to their questions. Shortly after, he rushed the officers' position with the gun drawn, leading to him getting shot twice.
1986-02-12	N.N.	21	Rosenheim	Bayern	Plainclothed police followed and eventually went to arrest a man who had tried to break open a freight cart at the train station. Two officers split up and approached the man from opposite angles, when he pulled out a knife and heavily injured the officer in front of him in the chest, piercing the heart and lungs. The attacker then fled, with the injured officer firing nine shots after the man, killing him with at least one shot.
1986-04-XX	N.N.	29	Hamburg	Hamburg	In Eimsbüttel, four police officers were called in to arrest a Turkish man for domestic abuse of his girlfriend. The drunk man heavily resisted as the officers tried to force him into a police car. Because 21-year-old officer Andreas Voigt believed the man might use the handcuff attached to his right wrist as a weapon, Voigt applied a jujutsu-based police "back transport grip" to quickly push the suspect inside. During a one-minute scuffle, the technique instead ended in a chokehold, causing the man's death by asphyxiation. The officer was charged with manslaughter and physical injury resulting in death.
1986-05-01	Schneider, Charles	38	Singen	Baden-Württemberg	Following reports of a stabbing at a local dive bar, police arrived at the premises to find a man fleeing into the courtyard. The man then pulled out a knife and a handgun, injuring two officers, aged 25 and 28, during a shootout until he was fatally shot. The man was discovered to have been an escaped convict who fled from Straßburg Prison, where he was imprisoned for a 1975 bank robbery, a year earlier during furlough.
1986-05-04	H., Herbert	19	Pfungstadt	Hessen	A repeat offender did not return after furlough from Jugendstrafanstalt Rockenberg and stole a motorhome with two accomplices. During the car chase, the driver rammed into two police cars that attempted to block the vehicle's way, heavily damaging one. Near the Pfungstadt-Ost interchange, a squad car drove up to the driver's side of the motorhome and shot the offender, who later died at a hospital. The two accomplices were injured as a result of the wounded driver losing control. The public prosecutor's office charged the 37-year-old officer with assault causing death, but a court declined to bring the matter to trial.
1986-05-16	Meck, Karl	57	Zorneding	Bayern	A neighbour called police over a possible break-in at the residence of a married couple, after spotting a figure fleeing the property after climbing down a ladder on the balcony, followed by a second male figure who remained on balcony. When police arrived, they found the person on the balcony gone and entered the house via the ladder, repeatedly announcing their presence and for occupants of the residence to show themselves. When an officer shone a light into a bedroom, a shot was fired in their direction, heavily injuring an officer in the eyes. Officers heard shouts for help from a woman, later identified as the homeowner's wife, and returned fire into the room. Inside, they then found the owner of the house, dead from police gunfire and in possession of a gas pistol. It's presumed that the neighbor misinterpreted seeing the homeowner chasing off the intruder, and that the arriving officers were mistaken for more burglars.
1986-07-07	E., Horst	22	Wilhelmshaven	Niedersachsen	Police were called to respond to a rape taking place at a private residence. At the location, officers were attacked by a man wielding a sabre, who was swiftly shot and killed. The deceased, a Bundeswehr soldier, is presumed to have attacked his wife over a financial argument.
1986-09-01	Obermayer, Hans	55	Rellingen	Schleswig-Holstein	Police rang the doorbell to a residence where a domestic incident between a married couple was reported. When the door was opened, the husband immediately opened fire on police, several stray shots entering a neighbor's house and striking a resident in the thigh. Officers fired nine times in return, hitting the attacker at least once in the chest.
1986-10-07	Soucka, Markku	27	München	Bayern	A Finnish engineer had taken a 54-year-old man hostage with a knife in broad daylight on a busy street in Moosach, dragged him into a stranger's car. and threatened to kill the hostage. Using the principle of a "fatal shot", police shot him when they assumed he was about to follow through on his threats. His motives remain unclear, though it was later discovered that he had a long psychiatric record and was apparently addicted to prescription medicine.
1986-10-31	Bloy, Werner	45	München	Bayern	In the evening of 29 October, an unemployed heater installer took his ex-girlfriend, 23-year-old commercial clerk Petra Hofmeier, hostage with a Mauser C96 after he unsuccessfully attempted to "talk things out" about their relationship and abducted her to his apartment in Schwabing. The hostage situation lasted 39 hours with a peak of 200 police officers monitoring the flat. The kidnapper demanded 1 million DM and a getaway car with a private chaffeur. Police decided after much deliberation that they had to make use of a "fatal shot", the first of its kind to be used by Munich police, with even the Archiepiscopal Ordinariate reasoning that deadly force had to be used as the final resort. On 31 October, police placed a SEK sniper by the apartment used as a hand off spot and at midday, after the hostage fetched breakfast items requested by the kidnapper, including four cold cut and cheese rolls, two packs of Marlboro cigarettes and a Sunday copy of a local newspaper, the kidnapper became upset that a bottle of lemonade was being handed over later than expected, leading to him throwing open the curtains to see what was happening. He was immediately shot by the sniper from a distance of 40 meters.
1986-11-12	D., Andreas	25	München	Bayern	A police officer doing volunteer work at a gas station foiled a robbery by two armed young men, shooting one of them three times. Their guns were found to be gas pistols.
1986-12-21	N.N.	30	Stammham	Bayern	Two officers were called to investigate the site of a break-in at an inn where they found the burglar still present. Although unarmed, he violently resisted arrest, to the point both officers fired their weapons once, with one shot hitting the burglar, who died at the scene after fleeing on foot.

1987

Date (YYYY-MM-TT)	Name	Age	Place	State	Summary of events
1987-02-05	M., Mustafa	25	München	Bayern	A car thief suspected of a string of radio thefts was caught in the act in a parking lot in Neuhausen by two plainclothed officers. Upon being confronted, the thief attacked 26-year-old officer Peter W. with a knife, who stepped back and shot the man in the stomach as he ran past. The officer fired again, this time at the legs, when the man spun back around and lunged forwards once more. The thief collapsed from his wounds and died on the way to the hospital.
1987-02-04	N.N.	44	Kempen	Nordrhein-Westfalen	Three men were seen by police attempting to break into a bar. One of the burglars fled and attempted to jump a 21-year-old officer who then used deadly force.
1987-06-08	N.N.	37	Tuttlingen	Baden-Württemberg	Police were called to an apartment building after neighbours complained about loud music from an apartment. Five officers fixated the noise offender to the ground and bound him. The man aspyhxiated from restraints around his neck as the officers carried him down the staircase to the squad car.
1987-06-17	L., Axel	27	Nahe	Schleswig-Holstein	A student threw a bag containing a note in German reading "Lufthansa Cape Town, Departure 17.30" in front of the airport in Hamburg and drove away. The incident was treated as a bomb threat, but the manhunt was made difficult as the car lacked a licence plate. The man repeatedly rammed police vehicles during the pursuit. Police were able to stop the student's vehicle in Nahe, where he again attempted to escape and hit an officer with his car. Three shots were fired into the windshield, killing the man. The student had been in prolonged psychiatric care and no bombs were found on the aborted flight. An investigation revealed that the officers involved misrepresented details about the manhunt, showing that a lack of action by police had allowed the suspect to avoid earlier arrest under less dangerous circumstances. Testimony about the shooting were also contradictory, which led to doubts whether the officers actually knew about the run down officer. A continued investigation was ultimately ceased.
1987-XX-XX	4 killed				IMK statistics list seven police shooting deaths, but independent sources were unable to determine the location and details to four of the incidents.

1988

Date (YYYY-MM-TT)	Name	Age	Place	State	Summary of events
1988-01-13	N.N.	23	Frankfurt am Main	Hessen	Police patrolling a car park attempted to conduct a drug search on a suspicious car when the driver accelerated and hit a policewoman. As the car attempted to drive off, a 32-year-old officer fired at the vehicle, hitting and killing the driver. After the arrest of the three other occupants, a search of the car found three grams of heroin and drug paraphernalia.
1988-02-06	Wawroschek, Armin	26	Köln	Nordrhein-Westfalen	While looking for a suspect who had robbed a gas station two hours earlier, two officers approached a man using a payphone for questioning. The man subsequently pulled out a Sig Sauer pistol and opened fire on one of the officers, who suffered a grazing injury and a shot in the abdomen. The other officer fired eight shots and killed the shooter. The loot of 4000 DM was found in his Nordstadt-Bonn home, where police also found several pistols, ammunition, a NVD, a detonator, and eco-terrorist writings in which he described "waging war" on the automotive industry and "car society" to "recreate an enjoyable landscape". Another note also took responsibility for a fire bombing on A98 on 14 January 1988, which was linked to another one in Bergheim. The offender had only been previously noted for participating in riots in Krefeld in relation to the 1984 visit of U.S. Vice President George H.W. Bush.
1988-03-04	Stefanovic, Slobodan	37	Dorfen	Bayern	Officers Robert Gebler, 27, und Karl-Heinz Loibl, 43, confiscated a cache of seven guns and 2000 rounds of ammunition from the home of a Bosniak Yugoslavian machinist, who was a 16-year resident of the town. His firearm license, which the machinist had obtained after joining a rifle club in his main residency in Ludwigshafen in 1984, was revoked the previous day following a psychological assessment that was made after the machinist reasoned in a license renewal in an eleven-page letter to a courthouse in Erding from 30 December 1987, that he needed protection from the German government, police, the Red Army Faction, the KGB, and American boxer Muhammad Ali. Two and a half hours later, the machinist drove over to the nearby police station, entered the room Gebler and Loibl were categorizing the weapons in and screamed "Give me my guns back!" before grabbing a Colt Peacemaker and .44 Magnum revolver off the table and gunning down both officers. He shot at several more police officers, as well as a responding paramedic, wounding officer Franz Klarl and fatally injuring officer Alfred Maier, 46, who died on the doorstep of a neighbour, telling him to call the Red Cross. After heavily injuring officer Frank K. in an arriving police cruiser, the machinist was fatally shot in the head and arm by the officer.
1988-04-13	N.N.	32	Emsdetten	Nordrhein-Westfalen	A Turkish man fatally shot two other Turks in an apparent family/love dispute in Nordhorn and fled in a car with his 24-year-old girlfriend. An officer shot the man through the side window during the chase, but not before he killed his girlfriend. The suspect died in a hospital from his injuries.
1988-05-04	N.N.	50	Hamburg	Hamburg	A 24-year-old police officer chased a man who had threatened a taxi driver with a knife and fled the cab shortly after. During the confrontation, the man walked towards the officer despite several verbal warnings and a shot in the air. When the passenger attempted to stab the officer, he was shot at least five times in the knee and arm. The officer then stumbled and inadvertently fired the fatal shot on the passenger. Both witnesses and an examination of the magazine showed that eight shots were fired in total, but an additional casing could not be located.
1988-06-05	N.N.		Schramberg	Baden-Württemberg	Neighbours alerted police to a break-in at a nearby bar. Upon entering the building, the two burglars attacked the officers, one of whom pulled out a gun and aimed it at an officer. The burglar was injured by a shot from the officer's partner, but managed to escape through a window before dying a few meters outside.
1988-11-25	N.N.	29	Lichtenfels	Bayern	Police responded to a potential break-in following a night alarm going off at a supermarket. During the sweep of the aisles, the burglar shot and critically injured an officer before he was gunned down by another. The burglar died several days later at a hospital.
1988-12-23	N.N.	25	Wiesbaden	Hessen	Two police officers attempted to perform an arrest on a man who did not return from his prison furlough. The man beat one of the officers down and while scuffling with the other, the second officer's gun accidentally discharged and killed the man.
1988-12-26	N.N.	36	Bremen	Bremen	A man heavily injured a 36-year-old visitor inside his home with a meat cleaver. Police arrived while the attack was still ongoing, but had no access besides a broken window. To save the other man's life, officers first shot at the attacker's limbs, then his torso. The attacker died from long-term complications of his wounds a year later on 30 December 1989 at a hospital.

1989

Date (YYYY-MM-TT)	Name	Age	Place	State	Summary of events
1989-02-22	N.N.	43	Köln	Nordrhein-Westfalen	A physician described as a "gun hoarder" called police to an emergency in Ostheim, claiming there was a "helpless person" in need of assistance at an abandoned construction site. Once the arriving officers stepped out of their car, the physician opened fire on them with two 9mm pistols. Officers returned fire as they retreated without injury and called backup. The shooter was found hidden in shrubbery, mortally wounded by two gunshots to the chest and stomach. Police had previously dealt with the deceased in 1987, when he fired a gun while threatening his wife, after which his arsenal was seized and he was given a lifetime ban on firearms. It's unknown how he obtained or kept the two weapons used during the ambush.
1989-03-25	N.N.	31	Speyer	Rheinland-Pfalz	A hotel owner called police due to a Turkish guest rampaging through the building. Police attempted to calm down the guest, but engaged him physically after this failed. The man then stabbed an officer twice with a knife, heavily injuring him, and threw the handle of the weapon at the officers, who shot and killed the attacker,
1989-5-25	N.N.	28	Straubing	Bayern	After an armed robbery at a casino hall, the robber stole 1,457 DM fled the scene in a company car, taking a 23-year-old female employee hostage. After a prolonged car chase, the vehicle was surrounded by two police cars on a street. The robber aimed his gun at the officers and was shot twice from both the front and back, dying in an ambulance.
1989-06-30	Cipiloglu, Kemal	13	Essen	Nordrhein-Westfalen	Two Turkish teenagers caused a traffic accident when they crashed the moped they were driving into a car. Although the damage was minor and they offered to pay for the repair on the spot, the younger of the pair fled on the moped when the motorist and his wife went to call police, likely because he had borrowed the uninsured bike from a neighbor. Upon being stopped, he took a police officer's gun while wrestling with him on the ground. He continued his flight and shot at the police several times. He was eventually surrounded in an area of allotments and was shot five times while standing on the roof of a hut. He fell to the ground and bled to death. The incident caused political repercussions due to the age of the shooter and the operational tactics of the police officers.
1989-07-28	Schumaier, Johann	36	Nellingen	Baden-Württemberg	In Oppingen, an off-duty police officer recognized a man as a convict who had escaped custody for multiple burglaries in April and was classed as dangerous. The officer arrested him and while they walked to the police station, the convict tried to flee on foot. Using a personally owned revolver, the officer shot the man in the stomach, after which he died in a hospital.
1989-08-08	Beyida-Otomo, Frédéric	48	Stuttgart	Baden-Württemberg	Gaisburg Bridge police stabbing [de]: A West African asylum seeker attacked a ticket controller on a tram, knocking out several of his teeth, before fleeing. When found by a police patrol two hours later, standing with his back turned by Gaisburg Bridge, the man resisted arrest and stabbed the officers with a bayonet he had hiddden in a newspaper, killing officers Peter Quast, 28, and Harald Poppe, 27, and wounding three others in an attack lasting around 15 seconds. He was killed with three shots by a wounded officer, Jürgen Hähnlein, as he attempted to flee the scene. Though it was first believed that the deceased had been fare-dodging, it was found that his public transport ticket was valid. It was discovered after the perpetrator's death that he had been living under a fake identity, having falsely claimed to be a 46-year-old Liberian named Albert Ament, when he was really a 48 year old Cameroonian named Frédéric Beyida-Otomo from Mbassila Village, Sa'a, who had spent the last 21 years living in several countries, including France, Spain, the United States, and Luxembourg. Otomo had lived in Germany for eight years when his asylum application had been recently denied and it was suspected he was mentally disturbed as he had written a death threat letter to Hans-Dietrich Genscher in broken German, demanding compensation for a three-month stint in a deportation facility. A search of Otomo's apartment revealed that he celebrated his 48th birthday only two days before the murders. The 1999 film Otomo depicts a dramatized recreation of the incident.
1989-08-27	N.N.	38	Gersheim	Bayern	A police officer shot and killed the boyfriend of his ex-wife before killing himself; the pair were still living together.
1989-09-09	Dittl, Peter	17	Würzburg	Bayern	Two plainclothed police officers approached a parked car out of suspicion that the two teenage occupants had broken into the vehicle. 37-year-old officer Hartmut Fertig accidentally discharged his sidearm, which he had pulled out of "safety concerns", striking the passenger of the car with a headshot. The teenager died in a hospital while his 18-year-old friend was unharmed. The bullet had shot clean through the deceased's head and become stuck in the door of a passing vehicle. The officer later said that he unintentionally pulled the trigger due to spotting a knife in the backseat and seeing the passenger panickedly gesturing with his hands. An investigation was halted, but the officer was sentenced to pay a 9000 DM fine.
1989-11-19	Em, Dietmar	30	Offenbach	Hessen	Laaber murders: On 13 November, two Austrian convicts escaped from prison in Steyr, stole two pistols, ammunition and a car in Linz and crossed the border into Bavaria with plans to rob a bank in Frankfurt am Main in order to go into hiding overseas. The pair stopped in Laaber to commit a robbery for gas money, settling on a pub with only five regulars and a single waitress inside, and took the place at gunpoint after ordering cola. When one of the regulars asked them to reconsider, the convicts opened fire, killing four (aged 34 to 48) and heavily injuring two before fleeing in their car. The son of the owner reported the shooting shortly after, leading to a 24-hour manhunt for the suspects. In Neumarkt, the convicts picked up two teenage boys hitchhiking and left them with the car in a parking garage as a lure for police to find while they burgled a house. On their return, they carjacked two mothers with children at gunpoint, taking one of the women, the 26-year-old wife of a policeman, and continued their drive, stopping in Erlangen where they raped the hostage. Police identified the vehicle in Würzburg and had a squad car follow it while creating artificial traffic jams on B43, allowing SEK to narrow down the convicts' car. Plainclothed SEK approached to arrest the fugitives and shot both of them during the operation, killing one with a headshot. The hostage was rescued with light injuries and the other convict, 25-year-old Helmut Bergmayer, was sentenced to life imprisonment in Straubing prison, where he killed himself in 2020.
1989-11-23	N.N.	22	Neumarkt in der Opferpfalz	Bayern	Four burglars, aged 17 to 22, were caught by plainclothed police loading stolen goods into a panel van. The driver of the van attempted to run over an officer, who dodged and shot out the vehicle's tires. When the officer opened the car door with his gun drawn, the driver grabbed the weapon, leading to the officer firing and killing the burglar. It was found that their loot was food worth around 50 DM. Police attributed the quick usage of the sidearm due to the Laaber murders the week earlier.
1989-12-26	N.N.	39	Mannheim	Baden-Württemberg	A 45-year-old man called for help after he was menaced by a group at a bar. Police found at least three men armed with various firearms outside the caller's house. Two of the men, aged 28 and 27, were arrested after throwing away their shotguns and trying to flee the scene. A third man, wielding a large-caliber pistol and apparently attempting to escape, opened fire on police, injuring two officers, leading to him being shot multiple times by police.

=== 1990s ===
1990

Date (YYYY-MM-TT)	Name	Age	Place	State	Summary of events
1990-01-10	W., Theo	36	Essen	Nordrhein-Westfalen	A pimp took a lawyer hostage in his office in Katernberg with a gas pistol to force a meeting with his wife, who was divorcing the pimp. After letting the lawyer's two secretaries leave, he threatened to shoot the lawyer and himself if his demands were not met. The pimp was shot in the chest by SEK when they stormed the premises. The incident temporarily interrupted the trial of the perpetrators of the Gladbeck hostage crisis, as the SEK officers tasked with court security had to be dispatched to the ongoing hostage taking.
1990-03-18	Dapperger, Oliver	29	München	Bayern	Police tracked down a convict, who had escaped from Landsberg Prison on 28 January during an eight-hour furlough, to his hiding place at a hotel in Solln following a tip-off. The drug dealer had reportedly returned to trafficking and selling large quantities of cocaine. Police found him in the courtyard and fatally shot him when he produced a gun and took aim at the officers.
1990-06-25	Suworow, Sergej N.	19	Burg	Bezirk Magdeburg	A Soviet sergeant stationed at the Herrenberg barracks in Magdeburg deserted his unit, taking with him a submachine gun and 800 rounds of ammunition. Diensteinheit IX tracked the deserter to Gerwisch, where the soldier took a married couple and their two children hostage at a camping site. After a brief-standoff, during which the soldier attempted to negotiate his return to Russia for "familial reason", the soldier ended up forcing the family into a car and had the father to drive the group across towards Burg at gunpoint. After encountering a roadblock, the soldier opened fire on police, injuring an officer. While struggling over the weapon with the hostage father, the soldier was shot in the head through the rear window by an officer. Following German reunification, authorities applied the principle of a "fatal shot" to the pollice's actions.
1990-07-06	B., Cem	19	München	Bayern	Police were called by a businessman who had previously complained about harassment and intimidation by Turkish youths since 1988. The businessman reported that he spotted a suspicious vehicle with five occupants in front of his home in Forstenried and that three of the young men had threatened him with a gun when he went to write down the licence plate. Police tracked the car with an Offenbach registration and when an officer went to conduct an ID check at a red light, the passenger side backseat door was opened without warning. Believing he was about to be attacked, the officer fired one shot into the vehicle, killing one of the teenage occupants with a headshot. An 18-year-old passenger was injured in the eye by shrapnel.
1990-08-06	N.N.	25	Stuttgart	Baden-Württemberg	During a security check on a person in Schlossgarten, a random, uninvolved Yugoslavian man shouted and waved at the two officers before abruptly firing five shots from a pistol at police. One officer fired his sidearm eight times from cover behind a tree, killing the attacker with three shots.
1990-09-06	N.N.		Chemnitz	Bezirk Karl-Marx-Stadt	Two men attempted to rob a branch of Deutsche Bank. They were engaged in a shootout by a passing police officer, during which one of the robbers was killed. The men were from Bavaria in West Germany (Wendelstein and Nürnberg), who had travelled to East Germany in a rented car and had stolen a local vehicle to commit the bank robbery. They are suspected to have been drug addicts.

== See also ==
- Lists of killings by law enforcement officers
- Use of firearms by police in Germany
