= Tommy Weissbecker =

Left-wing German militant

Thomas Weissbecker (or Weisbecker), known as Tommy (1949–1972), was a German leftwing militant shot dead by police at the age of 23. He was involved with the Haschrebellen, the Tupamaros West-Berlin, the 2 June Movement and the Red Army Faction. After his death, the Tommy Weisbecker Haus was squatted in Berlin.

== Life ==
Thomas Weissbecker was born in 1949 in Freiburg, then lived in Karlsruhe and Kiel. His father Ludwig Weisbecker was a professor of medicine at Kiel University who had been interned at Buchenwald concentration camp. Weissbecker studied in Karlsruhe and then Frankfurt, where he became involved in leftwing activism. In order to avoid conscription in Germany, he moved to West Berlin, where he joined the Haschrebellen and the Tupamaros West-Berlin.

In July 1971, Weissbecker stood trial alongside Bommi Baumann and Georg von Rauch for attacking the Quick magazine journalist Horst Rieck. Von Rauch was to be held in detention and Baumann and Weissbecker were released on bail; von Rauch pretended to be Weissbecker so Baumann and himself were released, then Weissbecker revealed who he actually was and was also released. The three men went underground and this marked the beginning of the militant leftwing group the 2 June Movement. Weissbecker also joined the Red Army Faction.

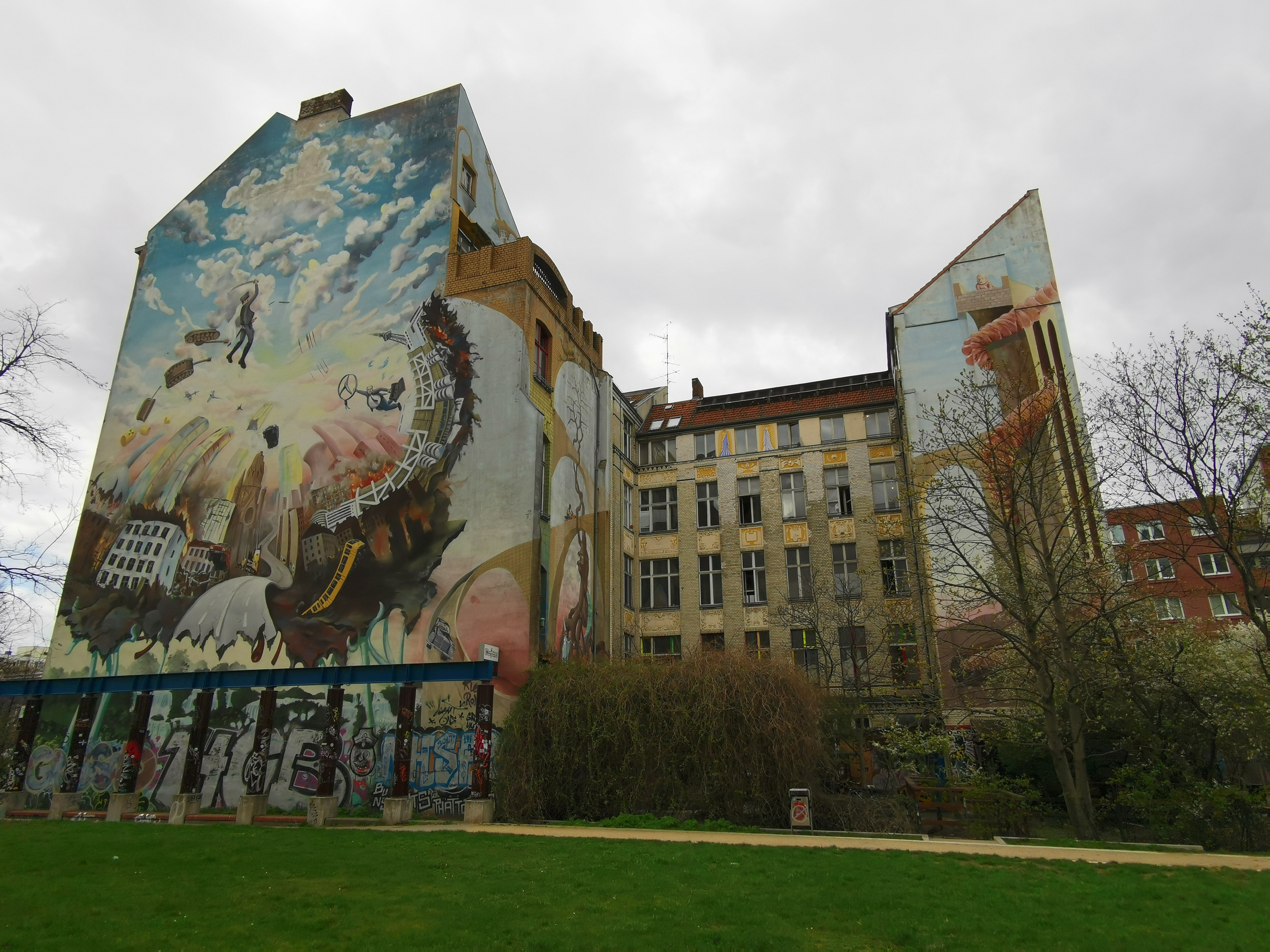
The Tommy Weisbecker Haus in 2021

Weissbecker moved to Augsburg and rented an apartment, whilst the police rented the apartment above and put him under surveillance. On 2 March 1972, he left his home with Carmen Roll; the police stopped them on the street and Weissbecker was shot dead. The RAF saw this as an execution and ten days later set two bombs which damaged police buildings in Augsburg and Munich. In West Berlin, the 2 June Movement bombed a police office and a building was squatted. It was named the Tommy Weisbecker Haus and still exists.

== See also ==
- Georg von Rauch Haus

== Sources ==
- Moncourt, André; Smith, J. (2009). The Red Army Faction, a Documentary History: Volume 1 – Projectiles for the People (eBook ed.). PM Press. ISBN 978-1-60486-029-0.
- Moncourt, André; Smith, J. (2013). The Red Army Faction: Volume 2 - Dancing with imperialism. Montreal, Quebec: Kersplebedeb. ISBN 978-1-60486-030-6.
