= Gabriele Kröcher-Tiedemann =

German Urban Guerrilla (1951–1995)

- Born: May 18, 1951; Ziegendorf, Mecklenburg-Vorpommern, East Germany
- Died: October 7, 1995 (aged 43–44)
- Organizations: 2 June Movement; Red Army Faction
- Spouse: Norbert Kröcher

Gabriele Kröcher-Tiedemann (18 May 1951 – 7 October 1995) was a German far-left militant, associated with the Movement 2 June (J2M) and the Red Army Faction. She married Norbert Kröcher in 1971 and later divorced him whilst she served a prison sentence. She was freed by the kidnapping of Peter Lorenz in 1975, then participated in the OPEC siege. In 1977, she was arrested in Switzerland after shooting two policemen. She was imprisoned until 1991 and died in 1995.

== Life ==
Gabriele Tiedemann was born in 1951 and attended the Free University of Berlin, where she became a political activist. She joined the anarchist 2 June Movement (2JM, named after date of the killing of Benno Ohnesorg in 1967) as it formed in the early 1970s alongside Verena Becker, Georg von Rauch, Inge Viett, Ina Siepmann, Ralf Reinders and Norbert Kröcher. She married Kröcher in 1971, taking the name Kröcher-Tiedemann. She was arrested in 1973 and was charged with bombings made by the Rote Ruhr Armee (Red Ruhr Army). She had wounded a police officer during her capture and was sentenced to eight years in prison. Whilst in prison she divorced Kröcher and stopped using his name.

In 1975, 2JM kidnapped Peter Lorenz, the CDU candidate to be the mayor of West Berlin. The group demanded DM 120,000 and the liberation of six political prisoners, namely Verena Becker, Rolf Heißler, Horst Mahler, Rolf Pohle, Siepmann and Tiedemann. Mahler refused to be freed and the other five were flown to South Yemen. Later that year and independently of M2J, Tiedemann was involved in the OPEC siege led by Carlos the Jackal in Vienna. The attack on OPEC (Organization of the Petroleum Exporting Countries) was organised by the Popular Front for the Liberation of Palestine – External Operations (PFLP-EO) in order to protest against the lifting of OPEC's oil embargo against Israel.

== Arrest ==
In November 1977, the Austrian industrialist Walter Michael Palmers was taken hostage and freed after a ransom of almost $2 million was paid by his family in currencies including the US dollar, Italian lira, Austrian schilling and Swiss franc. The following month Tiedemann was arrested in Switzerland with fellow radical Christian Möller in the Canton of Jura. They had driven across the border with France at Fahy; when they were challenged by two border guards, Tiedemann shot both of them with a pistol. The fugitives drove to Porrentruy then took a taxi to Delémont and were arrested at a police roadblock. At first the authorities thought they had captured Juliane Plambeck and Willy Peter Stoll; after checking fingerprints, they announced they had arrested Tiedemann and Möller. In Tiedemann's luggage, the police found fake identity papers, a report on the kidnapping and murder of Hanns Martin Schleyer, blueprints for the Israeli embassy in Belgium, two rifles and $20,000 from the Palmers ransom. Tiedemann was handed a 15 year prison sentence.

The RAF prisoners launched their eighth collective hunger strike in February 1981, demanding to associate with other prisoners and to be monitored by the International Commission for the Protection of Prisoners and Against Isolation Torture. In Switzerland, Möller, Tiedemann and Rolf Clemens Wagner joined the strike and on 11 March, reported that their conditions had improved. In 1987, Tiedemann was extradited to West Germany where she served the rest of her sentence received after her 1973 arrest. She was charged for her part in the OPEC raid and was acquitted in May 1990.

Tiedemann was released from prison in 1991 and died on 7 October 1995.

== In popular culture ==
Kröcher-Tiedemann was portrayed by Julia Hummer in the 2010 French television miniseries Carlos.
