= Ina Siepmann =

German political militant (1944–1982)

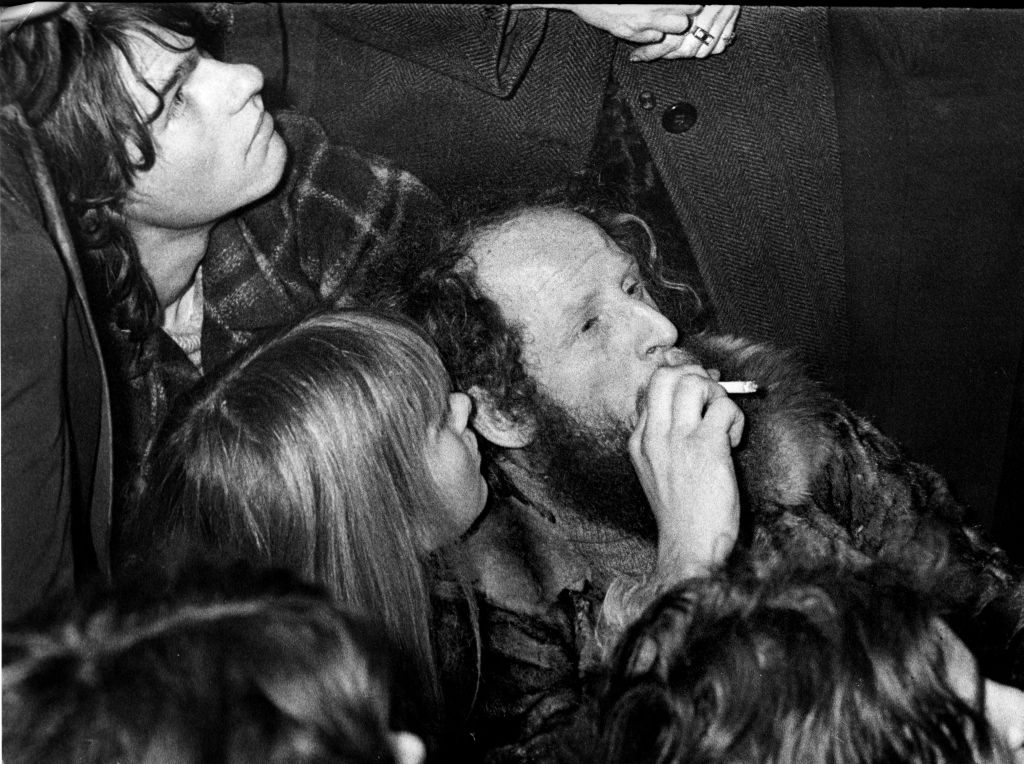
- Siepmann (left) beside Kunzelmann, during the student protests of 1968
- Born: 12 June 1944; Marienberg, Gau Saxony, Nazi Germany
- Died: 1982 (aged 37–38); Sabra, Beirut, Southern Lebanon
- Education: University of Tübingen
- Organizations: 2 June Movement; Red Army Faction
- Movement: Anarchism
- Spouse: Eckhard Siepmann
- Partner: Dieter Kunzelmann
- Children: 1

Ingrid "Ina" Siepmann (1944–1982) was a German political militant who was a member of the 2 June Movement (M2J) and later the Red Army Faction (RAF). She was freed from prison during the Peter Lorenz kidnapping and is believed to have died fighting against the Israel Defense Forces during the 1982 Sabra and Shatila massacre.

== Life ==
Ingrid Siepmann was born in Marienberg in 1944 and grew up in Schwelm. Her father was a pharmacist. She studied Greek at the University of Tübingen. In 1965, she married Eckhard Siepmann, having a son, Fritz, with him. Because of her child, she began an apprenticeship as a pharmacist. With her partner and son the family moved to West-Berlin in 1966. After the assassination attempt on Rudi Dutschke in 1968, Siepmann entered into left-wing political activism and the following year she began a relationship with Dieter Kunzelmann at Kommune 1. From June 1969, she and Kunzelmann were members of the Central Council of the wandering hash rebels. She travelled to Jordan in a bus owned by Technische Universität Berlin, together with Roswitha Conradt, Albert Fichter, Kunzelmann and Georg von Rauch. In September 1969, they met high-ranking Fatah and Palestine Liberation Organization (PLO) officials such as Yasser Arafat and Faruq al-Qaddumi. Siepmann stayed for a year, working in a Palestinian medical centre.

After Jordan, Siepmann returned to Berlin and was involved with the founding of the anarchist Movement 2 June (M2J), being taught by Bommi Baumann how to make explosive devices. The name M2J was used publicly for the first time by Siepmann to sign a responsibility claim for the bombing of the Federal Criminal Police Office in Schöneberg, Berlin. She was arrested in 1974 and imprisoned, before being freed and flown to South Yemen the following year after the kidnapping of Peter Lorenz.

Siepmann lived in Lebanon and was involved with anti-Zionist groups. She participated in the 1977 kidnapping of Austrian industrialist Walter Michael Palmers which raised funds for the Red Army Faction and PLO. The following year, Siepmann was detained with Inge Viett and Regina Nicolai in Czechoslovakia as they travelled to Baghdad. The three women were interrogated for three days about 2JM and their plans in the Middle East, until Viett asked to speak with her connections in East Germany and Stasi officers collected them. They stayed for two weeks in East Germany, then continued their journey.

== Death ==
Siepmann is thought to have died in the 1982 Lebanon War, fighting with the PLO against Israel Defense Forces. She is believed to have died in the Sabra and Shatila massacre. Her death was only confirmed in 1998, when the RAF dissolved and supplied a list of its deceased members.
