= Peter-Ernst Eiffe =

First German graffiti writer

- Born: 24 July 1941
- Died: 21 March 1984; Segeberg, West Germany
- Other names: Eiffe, der Bär
- Known for: First German graffiti writer
- Style: Graffiti
- Movement: Außerparlamentarische Opposition
- Children: Kathrin
- Parents: Peter Ernst Eiffe (father); Margarethe Eiffe née Harling (mother)

Peter-Ernst Eiffe (24 July 1941 - bef. 21 March 1984), also known as "Eiffe, der Bär" (transl. Eiffe, the bear) was probably the first graffiti artist in Germany. During the German student movement of May 1968, he distributed his messages all over Hamburg and became also known for entering the central station of Hamburg with a Fiat 600. On this occasion he was arrested and after a depression in 1970 retained in a psychiatric institution. Trying to escape from there in December 1983, he died of hypothermia.

His life was documented in a 1995 film with the title Eiffe for President - Alle Ampeln auf Gelb (transl. Eiffe for president, all traffic lights to yellow), taken from one of his famous graffito.

== Early life ==
Eiffe grew up in Duvenstedt, Hamburg with adoptive parents. His adoptive father was Representative of Hamburg to the Reich government in Berlin during the Nazi period (1933-1939).

After his Abitur, Eiffe became Leutnant (reserve) of the Bundeswehr. He then started to study Business administration but broke off after a few semesters. For a certain period he worked at the statal statistical office in Hamburg. His superiors attested him above-average intelligence, but his career came to a halt for other motives. He decorated his work-place with a portrait of Bismarck and erotic photographs and insulted each morning the cleaning personnel in French. Eventually he was fired in April 1968. Additionally, his wife left him together with their 18-month-old daughter.

== 1968 ==
In this time of personal crisis, Eiffe became famous In Hamburg for scrawling and scribbling all over the city, using mailboxes, billboards, traffic signs and subway stations and leaving whenever possible his business card: "Peter-Ernst Eiffe, Wandsbeker Chaussee 305, 2000 Hamburg 22", including his phone number. When the Hamburger Hochbahn issued him a bill over 900 German marks for damages to their property, he answered by issuing them a bill of 900 marks for his artwork.

Eiffe was also greatlyy attracted to the student movement. He was seen ever more frequently at student assemblies, dressed in a suit with white shirt and tie, pushing for the microphone and explaining his theories about the subversive power of the joke. His friend Fritz Teufel nominated him as speaker for the May Day campaign of the APO in Berlin, where he announced under the cheers of thousands his desire to become the chancellor of students and demonstrators. The microphone, however, was turned off before he could elaborate his political platform.

On May 30, 1968, Eiffe drove his car with the slogan Freie Eiffe-Republik (transl. Free Eiffe Republic) into the main hall of the central station of Hamburg and started to decorate the tiles with triangles. He was quickly arrested, ushered away in handcuffs and taken under press coverage to the psychiatric hospital Hamburg-Ochsenzoll.

Shortly afterwards, a booklet with photos of his surrealistic graffiti was published by Uwe Wandrey and Peter Schütt. 3000 copied were sold, resulting in an honorary of 500 German marks for Eiffe.

== Later life and legacy ==
In November 1968 Eiffe was released from psychiatric care and found a job with a marketing agency in Düsseldorf. Nevertheless, in 1970 he had a case of clinical depression and was hospitalized in the psychiatric hospital in Rickling, Schleswig-Holstein. On December 22, 1983, he managed to escape from there. Eventually, his dead body was found in March 21, 1984 in a moorland close to Rickling.

After his death, the fame of Eiffe as the first German graffiti artist lived on. Christian Bau recalled his life in one-hour documentary film with the title Eiffe for president, alle Ampeln auf gelb, which was shown in 1996 in independent cinemas. The author Uwe Timm included a number of Eiffe's sayings in the text of his novel Heißer Sommer.

== See also ==
- German student movement
- Kommune 1
- Ülo Kiple
