= Tommy Weisbecker Haus =

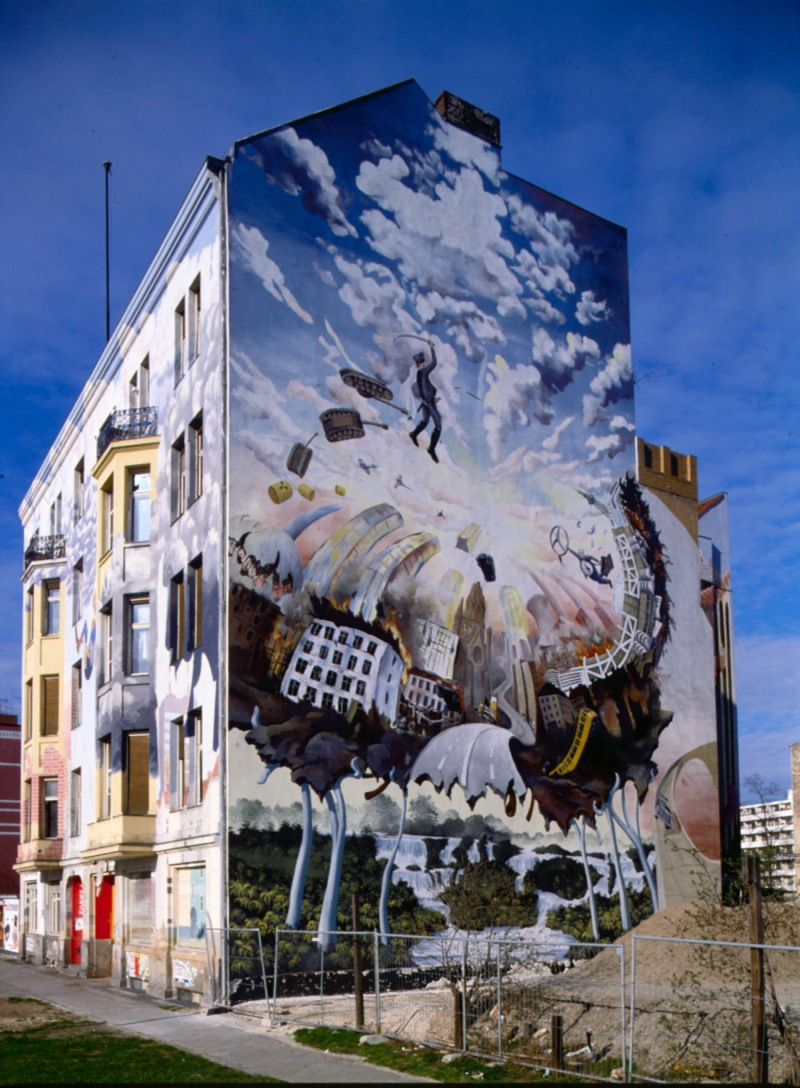
- Mural in 1990s

General information
- Classification: Housing project Self-managed social centre
- Location: Wilhelmstraße 9, Berlin, Germany
- Coordinates: 52.5013869°N 13.3890261°E
- Opened: Squatted 1973

Website
- tommyhaus.org

The Tommy Weisbecker Haus is a housing co-operative and self-managed social centre based in an apartment block in Kreuzberg, Berlin, Germany. It was established in 1973 when young people squatted it as an autonomous youth homeless shelter. Quickly legalized, it became a housing project and signed a new 30-year lease in 2013.

== History ==
The house was occupied in March 1973 and was one of the first squats in Berlin, alongside the Georg-von-Rauch-Haus. It is named after Tommy Weissbecker, a young anarchist who was involved in the 2 June Movement and was shot dead by police on 2 March 1972. The original plan was for the building to house homeless young people and it was quickly legalized as a shelter project. This status entitled the group to financial support and when the Senate of Berlin offered an amount the former squatters considered to be too low they organised a mass shoplifting protest.

After the kidnapping of Peter Lorenz in 1975, the house was raided owing to its perceived connection to the 2 June Movement. In 1981, the house was renovated as part of the International Building Exhibition Berlin.

The exterior of the house is covered by murals which were painted in 1989. They have become a celebrated example of street art in Berlin and a graffiti hall of fame.

== Recent events ==
In 2013, the house celebrated its fortieth anniversary and signed a new rental contract for another thirty years. It houses around 40 people and keeps four rooms available for homeless youths. On the groundfloor there is a self-managed social centre called Café Linie 1.
