= Außerparlamentarische Opposition =

Political protest movement in West Germany

The Außerparlamentarische Opposition (German for extra-parliamentary opposition, commonly known as the APO), was a political protest movement in West Germany during the latter half of the 1960s and early 1970s, forming a central part of the German student movement. Its membership consisted mostly of young people disillusioned with the grand coalition (Große Koalition) of the Social Democratic Party of Germany (SPD) and the Christian Democratic Union (CDU). Since the coalition controlled 95 percent of the Bundestag, the APO provided a more effective outlet for student dissent. Its most prominent member and unofficial spokesman was Rudi Dutschke.

== Classification ==
As opposed to APO, there was also opposition from other parties that, although they are represented in parliament, do not participate in the formation of the government. Small parties receive too few votes in an election to reenter the parliament. For example, in the past the Free Democratic Party (FDP) has often not been represented in Länderparlamente (federal state governments), but they are not classified as APO.

== APO in Germany ==
APO in Germany called primarily for the constitutional freedom of opinion, the press and assembly to convey its demands publicly. New political currents usually begin outside the parliament and usually creep over the Länderparlamente into the German Bundestag (federal parliament) or even into the Bundesregierung Deutschlands (the German federal government). For example, the Green Party entered into a coalition with the SPD (the social democratic party in Germany) in 1998, it remained in government until 2005.

== APO in the 1960s ==
The student movement began to gain strength and momentum in the middle of the 1960s in West Germany. The student movement is often used synonymously with APO, since it was at the time the most prominent form of extraparliamentary opposition in Germany. The student movement reached its peak in 1967 and 1968, especially in towns with universities. The most cited form of student-led APO was headed by the Sozialistischer Deutscher Studentenbund (the socialist German student group).

According to social democratic historian Heinrich August Winkler, major factors that formed the backdrop of this movement were criticism of the Vietnam War and the United States, students' anti-authoritarian rebellion against their parents' generation, criticism of professors' dominance of universities and continuity of the societal relations of power, especially the continuity in the civil service since the Nazi era, and the criticism of the centre-left SPD by those to the left of the SPD.

The APO was formed through the opposition mounting against the "grand coalition" government in power since 1966, which united the CDU and the SPD under the Chancellor Kurt Georg Kiesinger (CDU) and its proposed German Emergency Acts (emergency laws), which would maximise governmental control in case of a public dispute, allowing them to restrict civil rights such as privacy and freedom of movement. With 49 seats in parliament, the FDP was the only opposing party in the parliament at the time; the rest were in extraparliamentary opposition. This weakened the opposition, the Bundestag strengthened the APO in Germany.

The APO demanded a democratization of university politics. A motto of the student movement protesting against the old-fashioned nature of higher education institutions was "Unter den Talaren – Muff von 1000 Jahren" ("under the university gowns, the musty smell of a thousand years"), which also referred to Hitler, who had called his regime a rule for a thousand years.

The APO criticised society's repression of the crimes of National Socialism through its parents' generation, only interested in economic recovery. Thus, it joined worldwide protests against the Vietnam War and showed solidarity with the guerrilla fighters campaigning in North Vietnam against the actions of the US. Among other protagonists, the movement idolised Cuban guerilla fighter Che Guevara and the founder of the Vietnamese Communist Party Ho Chi Minh. "Ho-Ho-Ho-Chi-Minh" was often chanted at demonstrations towards the end of the 1960s.

Soon student movement took part in discussions about society and criticised society, demanding fundamental changes in society towards a socialist revolutionary ideal. New forms of communal life were tried, as well as new forms of protests and political actions. In particular, life in the Kommune I (Commune 1) had begun, spurred on by the words of Fritz Teufel, Dieter Kunzelmann and Rainer Langhans. Its members were often prosecuted, which caused a platform for further protests.

The APO also found support and theoretical guidance from intellectuals and philosophers such as Ernst Bloch, Theodor W. Adorno, Herbert Marcuse and Jean-Paul Sartre.

On the whole, the West German APO consisted of young people, mostly students, who could hardly gain a foothold in the workforce. A few analysts of the time, such as Jutta Ditfurth, spoke out against these assumptions and embraced the workforce, including them in the political movement.

In France, the case was somewhat different. There solidarity was found between the unions and the student activists, which led to a near-revolutionary situation and much disruption, street fighting and mass strikes in May 1968, culminating in a state crisis. One of the protagonists of the German and French APO, activist and later Green Party politician Daniel Cohn-Bendit was refused reentry into France on the initiative of president Charles de Gaulle. Further members of the APO were Joseph "Joschka" Fischer (German foreign minister from 1998 to 2005) and Matthias Beltz, who became a famous Kabarettist in the 1980s and the 1990s.

== Intensified conflict ==
A watershed in the history of the West German APO commenced on 2 June 1967, during demonstrations against the official visit of the Iranian Shah Mohammad Reza Pahlavi when student Benno Ohnesorg was shot by a policeman. Ohnesorg was attending his first-ever political demonstration, and his death left his pregnant girlfriend to fend for herself. The student movement radicalised itself, became more militant and focused its attention on the Springer Press, namely the Bild Zeitung (the German equivalent of the British publication The Sun), which greatly opposed the student movement to the general public.

Less than a year after the death of Benno Ohnesorg, a young worker named Josef Bachmann attempted to assassinate Rudi Dutschke, one of the most prominent leaders of the student movement; Bachmann shot Dutschke three times at close range, hitting him once in the head. Dutschke suffered health problems from the shooting for the rest of his life, including an epileptic condition that caused his death by an accidental drowning in 1979.

After 1969, the APO, in its then-current form, played no further role in West Germany, although there was further extraparliamentary opposition. New social movements in the 1970s affected political and social areas, which had already been addressed in part by the student movement. Environmental protection and nuclear power became the latest themes focused on by former APO activists.

== From the end of the APO to the founding of the Green Party ==
The APO disbanded itself in 1968, dividing into smaller communist groups known as K-Gruppen, which remained on the political landscape but had no notable influence on West German politics.

The "Marsch durch die Institutionen" (march through the institutions) propagated by Rudi Dutschke was embarked upon, resulting in the formation of the Green Party 11 years later. The idea behind this march was that political structures could be manipulated only from within, so it made more sense for larger groups to disband and for individuals and smaller groups to work more or less independently in their local areas to change the political system of their federal republic. The Green Party was formed to organize and accommodate the anti-nuclear movement in Germany, the peace movement activists and other new social movements in the 1970s and 1980s, whose founders had previously been very active in the APO.

In 1983, the German Green Party was elected into the Bundestag, where it stood for the concept of movement and change, so that its roots and philosophy were seen in new social movements. Within only a few years, the Greens gained much political power and prestige. In the time following the party's founding, there was a divide between the fundamentalists and the realists, which still exists. It was the willingness of the Greens to compromise and adapt that has led to their increased political power. In particular, since they entered into a coalition government with the SPD in 1998 and supported issues targeted by the APO which were in the eyes of many underrepresented such as participation in the Kosovo War in 1999 and the Afghan War in 2002.

== Radicalised groups ==
A small number of APO activists such as Andreas Baader, Gudrun Ensslin, journalist Ulrike Meinhof resorted to arson in department stores and illegal underground work. They collaborated in the "RAF" (German: Rote Armee Fraktion; English: Red Army Faction). This was initially called the "bewaffneten Widerstand" (English: armed opposition), and eventually became the terrorist group known as the Baader-Meinhof Gruppe. Bank robberies, kidnappings and even murders were committed against protagonists of businesses, politics and justice by the RAF, the "Bewegung 2. Juni" (Movement of the 2nd June) and the "Revolutionären Zellen" (Revolutionary Cells) until the 1980s.

== See also ==
- Autonomen
- German student movement
