= Wolfgang Kraushaar =

German political scientist and historian

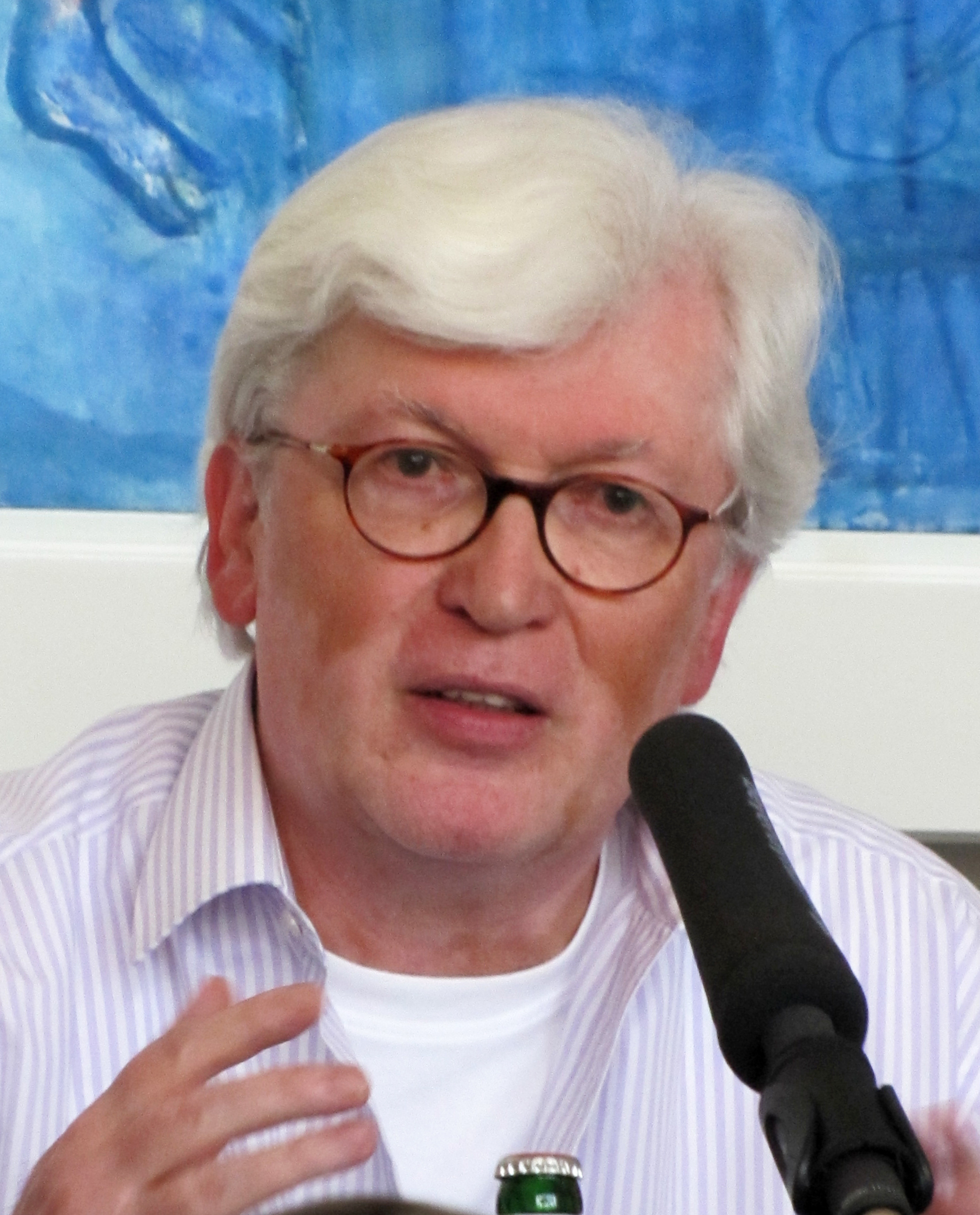
- Kraushaar in 2012
- Born: 1948 (age 77–78); Niederurff, Hesse, Trizone
- Occupation: Historian
- Relatives: Elmar Kraushaar (brother)

Academic background
- Education: Goethe University Frankfurt
- Thesis: (1982)
- Doctoral advisor: Iring Fetscher

Academic work
- Discipline: History
- Sub-discipline: Political science
- Website: wolfgang-kraushaar.com

Wolfgang Kraushaar (born 1948) is a political scientist and historian. After a residency at the Hamburger Institut für Sozialforschung from the 1980s until 2015, he continued his research at the Hamburg Foundation for the Promotion of Science and Culture also in Hamburg, Germany.

== Biography ==
Kraushaar grew up in the German village of Niederruf, Hesse in West Germany. After finishing the König-Heinrich-Schule in Fritzlar, in 1968 he studied political sciences, philosophy and German studies at the Goethe University Frankfurt. From 1974 to 1975 he was the chairman of AStA. In 1982 he graduated with a Ph.D. at Iring Fetscher with a work about structural change in German Universitys.

He took a residency at the Hamburger Institut für Sozialforschung since 1987. In 2015 he continued his work at the Hamburg Foundation for the Promotion of Science and Culture in Hamburg, Germany.

In 2004 Kraushaar had an visiting professorship Beijing Normal University. He had teaching assignments at the universities of Hamburg, FU Berlin, and Zurich.

He is member of "Vereinigung Deutscher Wissenschaftler" (Federation of German Scientist).

== Work ==
Kraushaar work focuses on the analysis of protest and political opposition in the Federal Republic of Germany and the German Democratic Republic during the period from 1949 to 1990, especially the protests of 1968, the Red Army Faction and K-Gruppen. He furthermore maintains a focus on national and international protest movements, totalitarianism and extremism, pop-culture and modern media.

Kraushaars most important publications are Die Protest Chronik (1996) (The Protest Chronic); Frankfurter Schule und Studentenbewegung (1998) (Frankfurt School and Student Movement); Die Bombe im Jüdischen Gemeindehaus (2010) (The Bomb in the Jewish Community Center); Die 68er Bewegung international (2018) (The German student movement international).

== Publications (extract) ==
- Die Revolution der 68er – was war links?, in: Robertson-von Trotha, Caroline Y. (ed.): Herausforderung Demokratie. Demokratisch, parlamentarisch, gut? (= Kulturwissenschaft interdisziplinär/Interdisciplinary Studies on Culture and Society, Vol. 6), Baden-Baden 2011. ISBN 978-3-8329-5816-9
- Die RAF und der linke Terrorismus. Hamburger Edition, Hamburg 2006.
- Die Bombe im Jüdischen Gemeindehaus. Hamburger Edition, Hamburg 2005. ISBN 3-936096-53-8
- Fischer in Frankfurt. Karriere eines Außenseiters. Hamburger Edition, Hamburg 2001. ISBN 3-930908-69-7
- Linke Geisterfahrer – Denkanstöße für eine antitotalitäre Linke. Verlag Neue Kritik, Frankfurt 2001. ISBN 3-8015-0320-8
- 1968 als Mythos, Chiffre und Zäsur. Hamburger Edition, Hamburg 2000. ISBN 3-930908-59-X
- 1968 – Das Jahr, das alles verändert hat. Piper, München 1998.
- Frankfurter Schule und Studentenbewegung - Von der Flaschenpost zum Molotowcocktail. Bd. I-III. Rogner & Bernhard, Hamburg 1998.
- Die Protest-Chronik 1949-1959 – Eine illustrierte Geschichte von Bewegung, Widerstand und Utopie. Bd. I-IV. Rogner & Bernhard bei Zweitausendeins, Hamburg 1996.
- (als Hrsg.): Frankfurter Schule und Studentenbewegung. Von der Flaschenpost zum Molotowcocktail. 3 Bände. Rogner & Bernhard, Hamburg 1998, ISBN 3-8077-0348-9.
- 1968 – Das Jahr, das alles verändert hat. Piper, München 1998, ISBN 3-492-04058-6.
- 1968 als Mythos, Chiffre und Zäsur. Hamburger Edition, Hamburg 2000, ISBN 3-930908-59-X.
- Linke Geisterfahrer. Denkanstöße für eine antitotalitäre Linke. Neue Kritik, Frankfurt 2001, ISBN 3-8015-0320-8.
- Fischer in Frankfurt. Karriere eines Außenseiters. Hamburger Edition, Hamburg 2001, ISBN 3-930908-69-7.
- (zusammen mit Karin Wieland und Jan Philipp Reemtsma): Rudi Dutschke, Andreas Baader und die RAF. Hamburger Edition, Hamburg 2005, ISBN 3-936096-54-6.
- Die Bombe im Jüdischen Gemeindehaus. Hamburger Edition, Hamburg 2005. ISBN 3-936096-53-8. (Über den versuchten Anschlag auf das Jüdische Gemeindehaus in Berlin am 9. November 1969 durch die Gruppe Tupamaros West-Berlin um Dieter Kunzelmann.)
- (als Hrsg.): Die RAF und der linke Terrorismus. 2 Bände. Hamburger Edition, Hamburg 2006, ISBN 3-936096-65-1.
- Achtundsechzig. Eine Bilanz. Propyläen, Berlin 2008, ISBN 978-3-549-07334-6.
- Verena Becker und der Verfassungsschutz. Hamburger Edition, Hamburg 2010, ISBN 978-3-86854-227-1.
- Der Aufruhr der Ausgebildeten: Vom Arabischen Frühling zu den weltweiten Anti-Banken-Protesten: Vom Arabischen Frühling zur Occupy-Bewegung. Hamburger Edition, Hamburg 2012, ISBN 978-3-86854-246-2.
- Der Griff nach der Notbremse – Nahaufnahmen des Protests. Wagenbach, Berlin 2012, ISBN 978-3-8031-2691-7.
- "Wann endlich beginnt bei Euch der Kampf gegen die heilige Kuh Israel?" München 1970: über die antisemitischen Wurzeln des deutschen Terrorismus. Rowohlt, Reinbek 2013, ISBN 978-3-498-03411-5.
- Die blinden Flecken der RAF. Stuttgart 2017, ISBN 978-3-608-98140-7.
- Die Blinden Flecken der RAF, Sonderausgabe, Bundeszentrale für politische Bildung, Bonn, 2018
- 1968. Hundert Seiten, Ditzingen 2018, ISBN 978-3-15-020452-8
- Die blinden Flecken der 68er-Bewegung, Stuttgart 2018, ISBN 978-3608981414
- Die 68er-Bewegung international – Eine illustrierte Chronik 1960-1969, Bd I–IV, Stuttgart 2018, ISBN 978-3608962925.
