= Fritz Teufel =

Figure in the West German political left of the 1960s

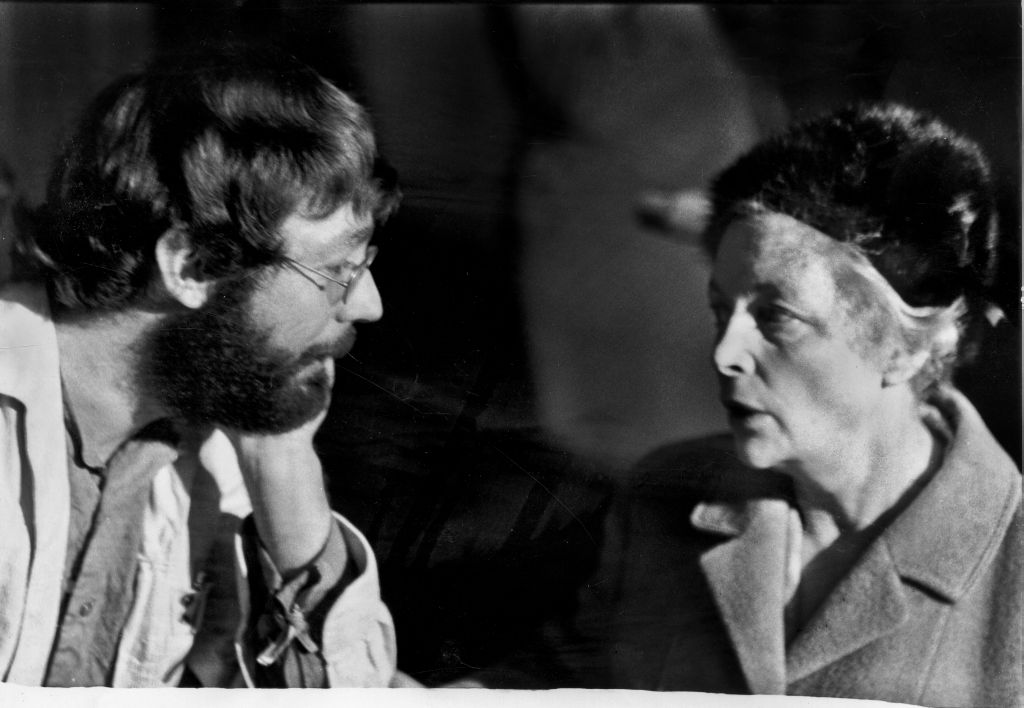
- Teufel (left) in conversation with his mother, 1968
- Born: 17 June 1943; Ingelheim am Rhein, People's State of Hesse, Nazi Germany
- Died: 6 July 2010 (aged 67); Berlin, Germany
- Education: Free University of Berlin
- Occupation: Bicycle courier
- Organizations: Tupamaros Munich; 2 June Movement
- Known for: Spaßguerilla
- Partner: Helene Lollo

Fritz Teufel (17 June 1943 – 6 July 2010) was a prominent figure in the West German political left of the 1960s. One of the founders of Kommune 1, Teufel cultivated a theatrical, humorous public image, encapsulated in his idea of the Spaßguerilla (transl. fun guerrilla). In the 1970s he rejected this image and became involved with the violent 2 June Movement. He was jailed several times in the 1960s and 1970s.

== Biography ==
Teufel was born on 17 June 1943, in Ingelheim and was raised in Ludwigsburg. He attended the Free University of Berlin, studying German literature and theater, which also allowed him to avoid conscription. In January 1967 Teufel, together with Dieter Kunzelmann and other radicals, founded Kommune 1 in West Berlin on Stuttgarter Platz, the nation's first politically motivated commune. Teufel was one of the instigators of what became known as the Pudding-Attentat (transl. Pudding Assassination), in which protesters planned to throw plastic bags filled with flour, pudding and yogurt at Vice President of the United States Hubert H. Humphrey, during an April 1967 state visit. 11 participants in the "plot" were arrested, but were quickly released, and Teufel was on his way to becoming a celebrity.

Following a demonstration on 2 June 1967 against the Shah of Iran that resulted in the death of protester Benno Ohnesorg, Teufel was arrested and charged with serious breach of peace. It was not until December that he was released, after he and many students with him had begun a hunger strike. His sympathizers held demonstrations, chanting "Freedom for Fritz Teufel" and "Drive the devil out of Moabit!" (Teufel was held in Moabit prison and the word "teufel" is German for "devil"). Teufel was eventually acquitted of the charges, but spent six months in custody before his release.

Like Kunzelmann and other German leftists, Teufel drifted toward the embrace of armed struggle at the end of the 1960s; in 1970 he told a journalist that "the clown Teufel is dead." After being tossed out of Kommune 1, Teufel moved to Munich, where he lived in a commune with future Red Army Faction member Irmgard Möller. Teufel founded the Tupamaros Munich militant group and later became involved with the 2 June Movement. Teufel was arrested in the early 1970s for his involvement in the firebombing of a Munich courthouse, for which he was convicted and sentenced to two years in jail.

In 1975 he was arrested and accused of taking part in the 2 June Movement's kidnapping of Peter Lorenz, a politician from the Christian Democratic Union. Teufel was imprisoned for five years before presenting an airtight alibi at his trial, proving that he had been working under an assumed name at a factory in Essen on the date in question. He would later say that he had remained silent until then to expose flaws in the German justice system. He was convicted of lesser crimes, including firearm possession and robbery, and sentenced to time served.

By the time of his release from prison Teufel had broken with the radical left. He briefly lived in London but in the late 1980s moved back to Berlin, where he contributed articles to Die Tageszeitung and worked as a bicycle courier. He was willing to grant interviews with reporters only under the condition that they agreed to play an hour of table tennis before he would be willing to answer any questions. Teufel suffered from Parkinson's disease and died on 6 July 2010, at the age of 67. He was survived by his partner, Helene Lollo.
