= Tupamaros (disambiguation) =

The name Tupamaros may refer to:

- Tupamaros (full name: Movimiento de Liberación Nacional-Tupamaros, acronym MLN-T), Uruguayan guerrilla group, active in the 1960s and 1970s
- Tupamaros München, German guerrilla group, active in the 1960s and 1970s
- Tupamaros West-Berlin, German guerrilla group, active in the 1960s
- Tupamaro (Venezuela), Venezuelan far-left political organization
- Túpac Amaru Revolutionary Movement, Peruvian guerrilla group, active in the 1980s
