= 2 June Movement =

West German anarchist militant group (1972–80)

- Bewegung 2. Juni
- Leader: Fritz Teufel
- Dates active: 1972–1980
- Dissolved: 2 June 1980
- Merged into: Red Army Faction
- Active regions: West Berlin
- Ideology: Anarchism; Autonomism
- Political position: Far-left

The 2 June Movement (German: Bewegung 2. Juni) was a West German anarchist militant group based in West Berlin. Active from January 1972 to 1980, the anarchist group was one of the few militant groups at the time in Germany. Although the 2 June Movement did not share the same ideology as the Red Army Faction (Baader-Meinhof Gang), these organizations were allies. The 2 June Movement did not establish as much influence in Germany as their Marxist counterparts, and is best known for kidnapping West Berlin mayoral candidate Peter Lorenz.

Rising from the ashes of political group Kommune 1 and militant group Tupamaros West-Berlin, the 2 June Movement was formed in July 1971. During the trial of Thomas Weissbecker, Michael Baumann, and Georg von Rauch for an assault on Horst Rieck, Baumann and Weissbecker were ordered to be released on bail. When the release was announced, Rauch, who was facing a probable ten-year sentence for other charges, pretended to be Weissbecker, and left the courtroom with Baumann. The two immediately went underground. Once Weissbecker revealed his identity, he was released from custody. Following their escape, the 2 June Movement was formed.

In contrast to the Red Army Faction (RAF), the 2 June Movement was anarchist rather than Marxist. The organization derived its name from the date that German university student Benno Ohnesorg was shot by West Berlin Police officer Karl-Heinz Kurras while participating in a protest against the Shah of Iran Mohammed Reza Pahlavi's state visit to Germany, as the demonstrators were attacked by the police. His death ignited the left-wing movement in West Germany, influencing politicians and political activists, and leading to the establishment of violent non-state actors. Although the organization never became as notorious as the RAF, the 2 June Movement was the most prominent in the first phase of German leftist post-World War II militarism.

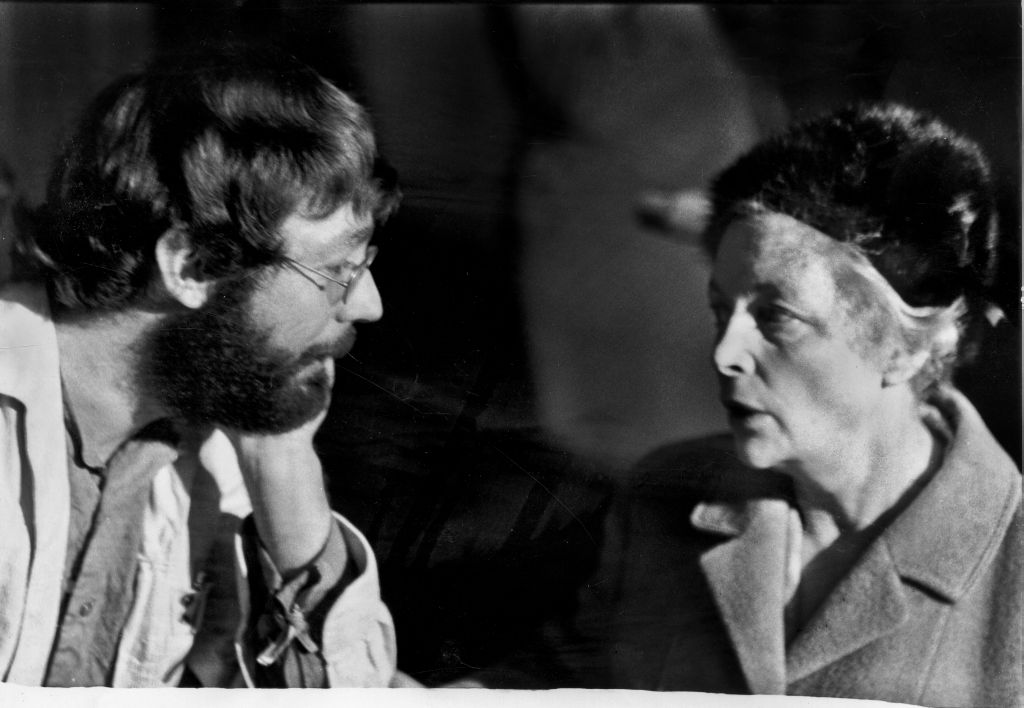
Fritz Teufel pictured (left)

== Fritz Teufel ==
Political activist Fritz Teufel became one of the leaders of the 2 June Movement. Originally taking part in Kommune 1, his comical take on revolutionary activity had him dubbed "fun guerilla" by himself and the general public. In 1967, Teufel became a quasi-icon in West Germany after being arrested. Charged with treason and the attempted assassination of United States Vice President Hubert Humphrey, Teufel was eventually acquitted. His humorous image was constructed following his arrest, as he and his associates were brought into questioning with a flour-pudding-yogurt concoction that was to be used as a "bomb". On 2 June 1967, Teufel was arrested again, this time falsely accused of throwing a rock at police and provoking the riot at which Benno Ohnesorg was killed. This time, he served six months in jail.

In 1975, Teufel was arrested and charged with kidnapping Peter Lorenz, spending five years in pre-trial detention. When he came to trial, he was able to prove he was working in a toilet seat factory at the time, yet was still convicted of various charges and given a sentence of five years, which he had already served.

Although the 2 June Movement never developed a clear ideology or purpose for its existence, Teufel's political activism was rooted in his hatred for his parents' generation. Just like many students and activists of his age, Teufel was angered by the Nazi regime of the previous generation, and fought to eliminate that image from Germany. Much of the resentment was directed towards those who had played a role in the Nazi regime, especially those who had never taken any responsibility for their actions.

== Bombings, kidnappings, and other violent acts ==
Aside from the kidnapping of Peter Lorenz, the group is known for many other attacks. The 2 June Movement predominantly used firearms when carrying out their attacks, but also used explosive devices.

On 4 December 1971 during a massive search throughout the city of West Berlin following the discovery of a Red Army Faction safe house, three members of the 2 June Movement got into a shootout with a plainclothes policeman. Georg von Rauch was killed, while Michael Baumann and another guerrilla managed to escape. Before this confrontation they had carried out an assault on Technische Universität Berlin a month prior.

On 2 February 1972, the 2 June Movement declared responsibility for a bombing at the Deutsch-Britischer Yacht Club in West Berlin. The attack, which killed the German club boatman, was later found out to be an act of assistance for the Irish Republican Army. During the trial, which took place in February 1974, 2 June Movement and other militants started a riot at the court's exterior.

On 2 March 1972 Thomas Weisbecker was killed in Augsburg, Germany during a shootout with two Munich policeman.

On the fifth anniversary of Benno Ohnesorg's death, a bomb exploded in West Berlin. To this day, no group has taken responsibility for the bombing, although it was inferred that attack was the action of 2 June Movement.

In West Berlin on 27 July 1973, the 2 June Movement stole 200,000 Deutsch Marks from a local bank.

In mid-1974, 2 June Movement member Ulrich Schmücker was shot to death by others in the organization. Although it is not clear what the rationale was for the shooting, Schmücker was believed to be an informant. The opposing argument was that the murder was an accident.

After Red Army Faction member Holger Meins died of starvation in prison in 1974, the 2 June Movement attempted a kidnapping of Superior Court Justice Günter von Drenkmann, who was killed in the process.

== Arrests and escapes ==
Throughout the course of the organization's history, several notable arrests resulted in the imprisonment of 2 June Movement members. Associate Till Meyer was taken into custody after a 29 March 1972 shooting in Bielefeld at which no one was wounded. By December, he was convicted of the attempted murder of a policeman, and imprisoned for three years.

On 19 April 1972 four hundred police raid the Georg von Rauch Haus. Evidence related to recent bombings were discovered, but members of the 2 June Movement who had been living there were elsewhere at the time of the raid. Twenty-seven people were taken in for questioning.

Later that June, Bernhard Braun was discovered and arrested for his activity in violent attacks, along with Red Army Faction member Brigitte Mohnhaupt.

In 1973, 2 June Movement member Gabi Kröcher-Tiedemann was arrested after shooting a policeman and sentenced to eight years in prison. She was set free in 1975 as a part of the bargain in the Peter Lorenz kidnapping. Within a few months of each other in late 1973, Inge Viett and Till Meyer escaped from prison.

== Kidnapping of Peter Lorenz ==
Three days before mayoral election in West Berlin in 1975, candidate Peter Lorenz of the Christian Democratic Union party was kidnapped by 2 June Movement members. Lorenz was cornered while on the road, and was thrown into another vehicle after his driver was knocked unconscious from the vehicle collision involving the kidnappers. In an effort to free several imprisoned Red Army Faction and 2 June Movement affiliates, the kidnappers publicized a photo which showed Lorenz with a sign around his neck that read "Peter Lorenz, prisoner of the 2nd June Movement". The photo also contained a message that demanded the release of Gabriele Kröcher-Tiedemann, Horst Mahler, Ingrid Siepmann, Rolf Heissler, Rolf Pohle, and Verena Becker from prison. Along with the release of these members, 2 June Movement also demanded that a jet be provided to fly the radicals out to Aden located in South Yemen, and 9,000 German marks should be given to the 2 June Movement. The West German government met their demands, releasing all but Horst Mahler, who did not want to be set free. On 5 March 1975 Peter Lorenz was released at midnight, six hours after the West German Government had fulfilled the demands made by his abductors. He was dropped off in Wilmersdorf district, walked to a telephone booth, and called his wife, Marianne, to tell her that their six-day ordeal was over.

== Dissolution ==
On 2 June 1980, the 2 June Movement declared that they had disbanded and merged with the Red Army Faction in a letter to the German daily newspaper, Frankfurter Rundschau. Anti-imperialism was a common cause that brought the 2 June Movement to join forces with the Red Army Faction. The 2 June movement ended their statement with "Unity in the Anti-Imperialist Armed Struggle" conveying their solidarity with the Red Army Faction.

== Members ==
- Michael Baumann
- Ralf Reinders
- Ronald Fritsch
- Georg von Rauch
- Angela Luther
- Till Meyer
- Fritz Teufel
- Gabriele Kröcher-Tiedemann
- Verena Becker
- Norbert Kröcher
- Inge Viett
- Gabrielle Rollnick
- Zachary Schwartz
- Berhard Braun

== See also ==
- Anarchism in Germany
- German student movement
- Insurrectionary anarchism
- Terrorism in Germany
