= Peter Urbach =

German agent provocateur (1940–2011)

Peter Urbach (2 May 1940 – 3 May 2011) was an informant and agent provocateur of the West Berlin domestic intelligence agency, the Verfassungsschutz, in the late 1960s and early 1970s. He had contacts with the Kommune 1 and with several people who would go on to form the German terrorist organization, Red Army Faction. He supplied the scene with weapons, Molotov cocktails and bombs.

In 2005 it was revealed that Urbach had supplied the bomb for the 9 November 1969 attempted attack on the Jewish Community Center in Berlin by the Tupamaros West-Berlin. The bomb failed to explode, but a police report concluded that it contained enough explosives to have killed many of the 250 people present in the center at the time. The people behind the attack were known by the prosecutor's office, but they were not charged, presumably to avoid uncovering the government's involvement.

In 1970 information by Urbach led to the first arrest of Andreas Baader who would go on to lead the Red Army Faction. His cover having been blown, Urbach testified at a terrorism trial in 1971 and was then given a new identity by the security agencies; he lived in California under his own name until his death in 2011.

German historian Gerd Koenen called the planned disappearance of Urbach by the Verfassungsschutz, and the lack of official inquiries of Urbach's possible actions in fostering leftist terrorism, "one of the greatest scandals of its kind in the history of the Federal Republic of Germany", and added that the ongoing lack of clarification would result in a "disturbing silence".

== Literature ==
Ada Wilson, Red Army Faction Blues, Route, Pontefract 2012, ISBN 978-1-901927-48-1
