= Günter von Drenkmann =

German lawyer (1910–1974)

- Born: George Richard Ernst Günter von Drenkmann; November 9, 1910; Berlin, German Empire
- Died: November 10, 1974 (aged 64); West Berlin, West Germany
- Education: University of Tübingen; Ludwig-Maximilians-Universität München; Friedrich Wilhelm University of Berlin
- Occupations: Lawyer; President of the Berlin district court ("Kammergericht")
- Known for: the circumstances of his murder
- Spouse(s): 1. Lilo Morgenroth (1918-; 2. Christel ______ (1922-2011)
- Children: Peter von Drenkmann (and others)
- Parent(s): Edwin von Drenkmann (1864-1944); Helen Drory (1874-1968)

Günter von Drenkmann (November 9, 1910 – November 10, 1974) was a German lawyer. In 1967, he was appointed president of the Berlin district court ("Kammergericht"). The post was one that his grandfather had held between 1890 and 1904. He was killed by "2 June Movement" militants during a kidnapping attempt.

== Life ==
=== Provenance and connections ===
George Richard Ernst Günter von Drenkmann was born in Berlin. He came from a well-connected family. The "Drenckmanns" had become "von Drenckmanns" when his grandfather was ennobled in 1901. His father, Edwin von Drenkmann (1864-1944) had been a senior Prussian financial official ("Geheime Oberfinanzrat"). His mother, born Helen Drory (1874-1968), was the granddaughter of Leonard Drory (1800-1866), an entrepreneur from Colchester, England, and his wife.

One of Günter von Drenkmann's sons, Peter von Drenkmann, later also served as president of the Berlin district court ("Kammergericht"), between 1999 and 2005.

=== Early years ===
Günter von Drenkmann studied Jurisprudence at the University of Tübingen, the Ludwig-Maximilians-Universität München, and the Friedrich Wilhelm University of Berlin. His education was predicated on the expectation that he should follow the family tradition and become a judge. However, at the start of 1933 the Nazis took power and lost no time in transforming Germany into a one-party dictatorship. Von Drenckmann repeatedly refused to join any Nazi-connected organisation, so was unable to become a judge. Instead he worked on legal matters in industry and for the chamber of commerce.

In the later 1930s, together with his friend Francis Wolff he was a member of "Hot Club Berlin". This was a circle of friends who got together in private to listen to banned jazz music. They also established contact with one or two jazz musicians such as Herb Flemming. In 1939 Wolff, who was Jewish, immigrated to New York to escape Nazi oppression. There he built a career as a successful record company executive. Von Drenkmann stayed in Germany.

In April 1939 he married Lilo Morgenroth.

=== Middle years ===
May 1945 marked the end of the war and the end of the Nazi regime. Drenkmann was among relatively few lawyers who had stayed independent of the Nazi Party. By temperament, he was a liberal Social Democrat, and in 1945 (if not earlier) he became a member of the Social Democratic Party ("Sozialdemokratische Partei Deutschlands" / SPD).

His career as a judge began in 1947 with appointment as a judge for civil matters at the Berlin district court ("Kammergericht"). True to his family tradition, a succession of promotions quickly followed. In 1967, he was selected as president of the Berlin district court ("Kammergericht").

== Death ==
Von Drenkmann celebrated his sixty-fourth birthday on 9 November 1974. He planned to retire a year later. On Sunday 10 November 1974 he was at home with his wife. An unexpected visitor appeared at the door. When the bell rang he went to open the door, placing it "on the chain" because something felt not right. Several assailants forced their way into the apartment. There was a struggle and a gun was used. Someone fired a .38 calibre "dumdum" bullet and it hit Drenkmann. Neighbours saw the attackers escape in two cars. Günter von Drenkmann died on the way to hospital.

The 2 June Movement claimed credit for the murder against someone who it said was one of those "responsible ... for the murder of a comrade". The previous day, Holger Meins, a student member of the RAF, had died at the Wittlich Youth Penitentiary, where he had been held. Meins was known as a large man but weighed just 39 kilograms (86 lb) at the time of his death. It was reported and widely accepted that he had died of starvation as a result of a hunger strike that he and other RAF prisoners had undertaken in an effort to pressure authorities to improve prison conditions.

The attack on von Drenkmann was found to have been part of a planned kidnapping for ransom that went wrong. Some of the militants believed they had a "need to escalate their profile".

In 1986 six members of the "2 June Movement" were prosecuted in what was known as the Lorenz-Drenkmann trial, which covered both the 1974 killing of Günter von Drenkmann and the 1975 kidnapping of Peter Lorenz. The court was unable to attribute the killing of von Drenkmann to any of the six individuals on trial. It remains unclear who killed von Drenkmann. All six defendants were convicted of the kidnapping of Peter Lorenz and membership in a criminal association. They were sentenced to substantial jail terms, of up to fifteen years apiece.

The murder of von Drenkmann is frequently cited as the first of a series of widely publicised militant actions in West Germany.

A state funeral for von Drenkmann was held in front of Berlin's Schöneberg City-hall. More than 20,000 members of the public attended. West German President Walter Scheel gave a brief address, calling for all democrats to join the war against terror.

== Commemoration ==
A bronze memorial tablet to von Drenkmann was placed on the former courthouse building in Berlin-Charlottenburg. When the court relocated to Berlin-Schöneberg another memorial tablet was placed near the entrance. However, plans announced in 2004 to rename the street in which the new building is located from Elßholzstraße to Drenkmannstraße have not been implemented. "The checking processes continue" was the explanation from Andrea Boehnke, speaking on behalf of the Justice Ministry, when asked about it in 2014.
