= Uniseum =

Coordinates: 47.995345°N 7.84863°E

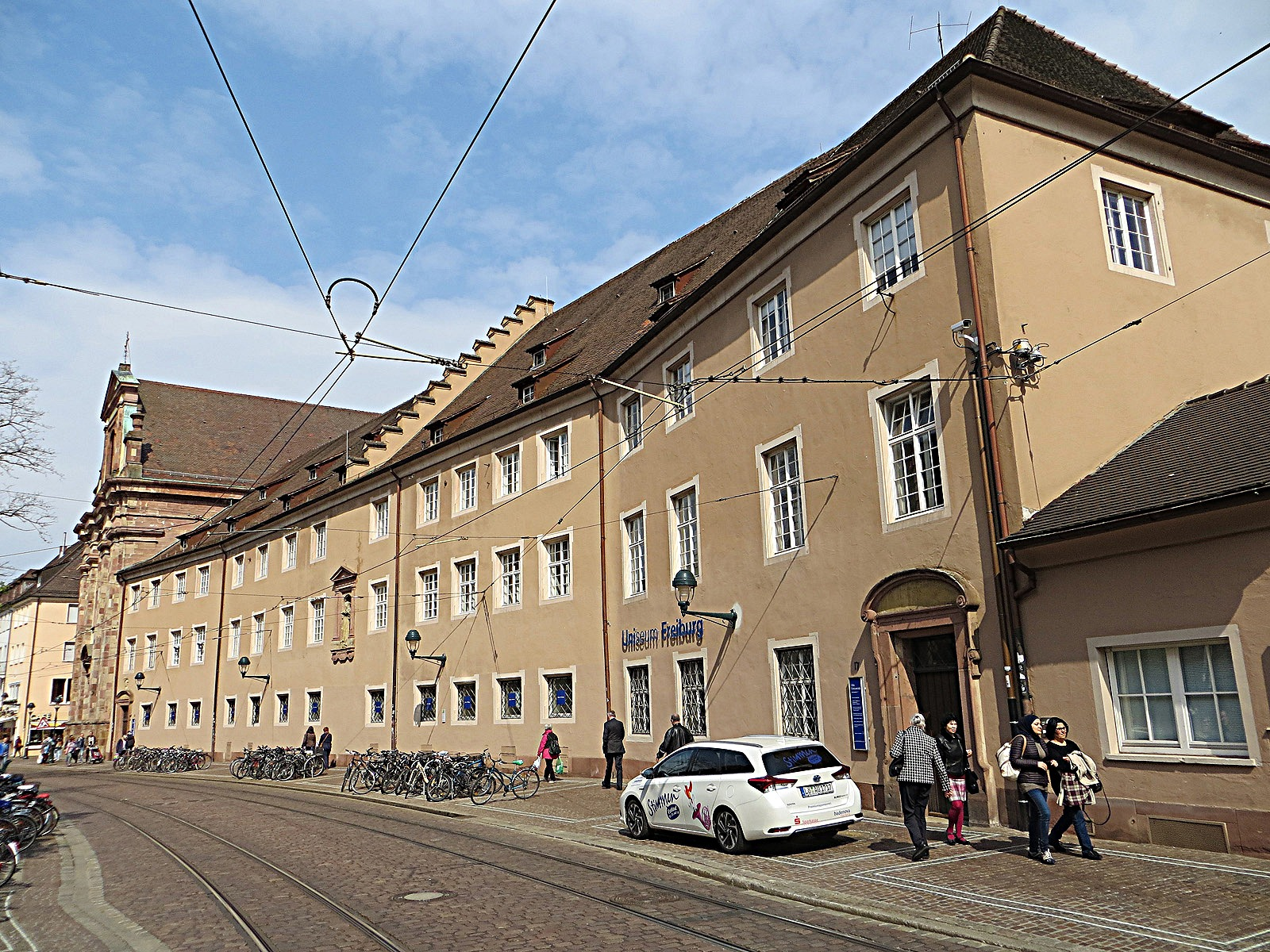
Albert-Ludwigs-Universität Freiburg - panoramio

The Uniseum is the university museum of the Albert-Ludwigs-Universität in Freiburg im Breisgau, Germany. The name is a portmanteau of Universität and Museum (university and museum). As a neologism, it is trademarked.

Opened in 2004, the museum documents the history of Freiburg’s university from its foundation in 1457 up to the German student movement of the 1960s. The artefacts are organised on a thematic basis. Moreover, each of the university’s more influential disciplines - medicine, natural sciences and humanities - has its own designated section. Furthermore, there is a Cabinet of curiosities modelled after the ones from the Renaissance period, as well as a collection of moulages.

The Uniseum is located in the building of the Alte Universität (Old University), which has served as a university building since 1557. The vaulted cellars of the building offer a glimpse into the history of the building and its architectural antecedents.

== See also ==
- List of Jesuit sites
