= Rolf Ludwig Pohle =

German lawyer and activist convicted as a member of RAF (1942–2004)

- Born: 4 January 1942
- Died: 7 February 2004 (aged 62)
- Occupations: Lawyer, Teacher of the German language, Translator
- Organization: Red Army Faction
- Movement: Marxism-Leninism

Rolf Ludwig Pohle (4 January 1942 - 7 February 2004) was a lawyer and activist who was also convicted as a member of the terrorist organization Red Army Faction (RAF).

== Biography ==
Rolf Pohle was born in Berlin in 1942 and from 1954 onward he lived in Munich. He was the son of Law Professor Rudolf Pohle. He studied in Munich's Maximiliansgymnasium and then Law at the Humboldt University of Berlin and LMU Munich, and graduated in 1966. During his studies, he joined the German Liberal Students' Club (Liberaler Studentenbund Deutschlands). He later became a member of the extra-parliamentary Opposition (APO) and in 1967, he was elected president of a students' club at LMU Munich. After the assassination attempt against the student Rudi Dutschke in April 1968, he stood as a lawyer for the arrested members of APO. In 1969, Pohle was sentenced to 15 months in prison for participating in the protests of spring 1968.

In 1971, he was arrested again and, after being in jail for about two years, in 1974 he was sentenced to 6 1/2 years in prison for participation in the terrorist organization Faction Red Army and possession of guns. However, he refused the accusations. When asked in the court to provide information about himself, he read the lyrics of the song Mein Name ist Mensch (My name is Human).

In March 1975, the Movement of 2 June (organization cooperating with RAF) kidnapped Peter Lorenz, politician of CDU, threatening to kill him if Pohle and other members of the RAF were not released. The government accepted and released the prisoners, who were then transferred to South Yemen. From there, Pohle went to Greece where he was arrested in July 1976. Initially the court (Συμβούλιο Εφετών) rejected the request for his extradition to Germany based on the political nature of his crimes and the prohibition by the Greek Constitution of the "extradition of a foreigner who is persecuted for his action for freedom". However, the Supreme Court made an appeal to the court's decision and allowed his extradition. During these trials, there was a large movement in favor of Pohle and against his extradition. Despite this, he was imprisoned in Germany for six years, until 1982. Two years later, he moved to Athens, Greece, where he spent the rest of his life. He worked as a German language instructor and interpreter. He married lawyer Katerina Iatropoulou, a member of his defense team in his extradition case. He died on 7 February 2004, after a long fight with cancer. According to other information, he died from AIDS.
