= Bommi Baumann =

German militant (1947–2016)

- Born: Michael Baumann; 25 August 1947; Berlin-Lichtenberg, Soviet occupation zone in Germany
- Died: 19 July 2016 (aged 68); Berlin-Friedrichshain, Germany
- Organization: Movement 2 June

Michael "Bommi" Baumann (25 August 1947 – 19 July 2016) was a German author and former militant. After growing up in Berlin, he was radicalised by the police shooting of Benno Ohnesorg and founded the Movement 2 June with his best friend Georg von Rauch. After von Rauch was shot dead by the police and a bomb planted by Baumann killed a builder, Baumann fled abroad. Whilst on the run he wrote the memoir Wie alles anfing (How it All Began) and renounced political violence. The book sold 100,000 copies. Baumann was arrested in London in 1981 and following a prison term lived in Berlin.

== Early life ==
Michael Baumann was born on 25 August 1947, to an apolitical mother and a father who had been a Nazi. The family lived first in Lichtenberg in the Soviet part of Berlin, then moved to the British zone when he was 12 years old. He trained as a construction worker. He later commented that he became dissatisfied with the mindless world of work and television he saw around him. In 1964, Baumann started to engage with the counterculture and to hang out at the Kaiser Wilhelm Memorial Church where dropouts would drink wine and take the stimulant Captagon or the cough medicine Romilar for psychoactive effects. By 1966, people had begun to bring hashish back from Afghanistan and Morocco.

== Central Council of Roving Hash Rebels ==
The Central Council of Roving Hash Rebels or short Haschrebellen was a militant political organisation in West-Berlin. Founded in protest against the Berlin Senate's restrictive drug policy and the numerous drug raids in trendy bars, the group quickly became politicized. While activists around Rainer Langhans soon distanced themselves from the hash rebels and consciously opted for peaceful protest, Bommi Baumann and his friends sought a radical change in circumstances. The roots of Tupamaros West-Berlin are in the Hash Rebells. The group was more anarchist orientated and has not a strict hierarchy like RAF.

Tumamaros West-Berlin, the Haschrebellen and Schwarze Ratten (Black Rats) were groups of the Berlin left-wing underground, called the Berliner Blues.

Loose associations became political groups in the face of increasing repression from the police and politicians. From November 1969, Tupamaro's self-naming of West Berlin, which indicated an expanded political program and more spectacular actions, became established.

This movement became an important transitional phenomenon between the protests of the Extra-Parliamentary Opposition (APO) and terrorist activities, particularly through its increasingly aggressive rhetoric, its critical attitude towards Israel and its legitimization and use of violence in attacks with incendiary devices or explosive devices or the use of firearms the Red Army Faction and the 2 June Movement.

Most known members of Hash Rebells were Dieter Kunzelmann, Ralf Reinders, Michael „Bommi“ Baumann, Ronald Fritzsch, Norbert „Knofo“ Kröcher, Bodo Saggel, Bernhard Braun, Georg von Rauch and Thomas Weissbecker.

== Radicalisation ==
Baumann began to visit Kommune 1 and was radicalised by the police shooting of Benno Ohnesorg on 2 June 1967. He was living with Georg von Rauch and Thomas Weissbecker in the Wielandkommune and they decided to become urban guerillas, forming a group called the Zentralrat der umherschweifenden Haschrebellen (Central Council of Roving Hash Rebels). Baumann participated in the riots and attacks against the Springer Media headquarters on the Easter weekend of 1968 after the assassination attempt on Rudi Dutschke.

Baumann founded the Movement 2 June with his best friend Georg von Rauch. The name was inspired by the date of the death of Ohnesorg and Baumann later commented it was supposed to show that the state had initiated the violence. It was an anarchist group, which knew the Red Army Faction but found it elitist. Baumann recruited Inge Viett and Verena Becker to the Movement 2 June and together they planted a bomb at the British Yacht Club in Gatow which killed a builder. This death caused Baumann to consider his role in political violence, whilst Becker and Viett moved on to join the Red Army Faction.

== On the run ==
In December 1971, Baumann was with Georg von Rauch in Schöneberg and after a confrontation with the police, Rauch was shot dead. Having escaped and been affected by the death of his friend, Baumann went on the run. He travelled to Afghanistan, India and Syria. In 1974, he met with filmmaker Harun Farocki in Austria, giving an interview over 72 hours which was then edited into the book Wie alles anfing (How it All Began) and released the following year. The police raided Trikont (the publishers) in Munich and confiscated all the copies, which led to the book selling 100,000 copies and being translated into seven languages. Heinrich Böll and Peter Handke contributed statements in support of freedom of speech. Gudrun Ensslin of the Red Army Faction called it a "fascist pamphlet", whilst Daniel Cohn-Bendit contributed an afterword in which he praised it as a "literary masterpiece" and a "revolutionary book". The book was published in English with the title How it all began: The personal account of a West German urban guerrilla in 1981.

In 1974, he abjured violence in an interview with the news magazine Der Spiegel given whilst he was living underground. His comment "Freunde, schmeißt die Knarre weg" ("Friends, throw away your gun") became well-known and he said he no longer saw himself as an anarchist. Whilst still on the run Baumann was interviewed by a journalist in Rome in 1980, who commented that he was dressed as a punk and hiding in plain sight. Baumann was arrested in a squat in Hackney, London in February 1981. After a trial at the Landgericht Berlin he was sentenced to a term of five years and two months imprisonment for two bank robberies and a bomb attack on the Berlin police headquarters.

== Informer ==
When the documents of the former East Germany were made accessible by the Stasi Records Agency after the German reunification, Der Spiegel published an account in 1998 of how Baumann had written a 125-page report to the East German Ministry for State Security (Stasi) about 94 people within the armed struggle movement, including information on assaults, attacks, weapons, and sexual preferences. Beyond that, 165 pages of interrogation records existed on Baumann, who had been arrested by the Stasi whilst on the run in 1973. During a period of six weeks, Baumann shared his insider knowledge in 114 hours of interrogation. Many former comrades then shunned Baumann as a police informer.

== Later life ==
In his later life, Baumann lived in Berlin and occasionally lectured on the topics of drugs and terrorism. In 2009, upon the launch of his book Rausch und Terror. Ein politischer Erlebnisbericht he was interviewed by Der Spiegel and said he had been addicted to hard drugs for 25 years, then abstinent for 16 years. He stated that nine out of ten people he knew when he was a user were now dead. He died on 19 July 2016.

== Bibliography ==
=== In German ===
- Bommi Baumann: Wie alles anfing ("How it All Began") 1975, ISBN 3-88022-061-1
- Bommi Baumann: Hi Ho. Wer nicht weggeht, kommt nicht wieder ("Hi Ho. If you don't go away, you can't come back") 1987, ISBN 3-455-08655-1
- Bommi Baumann/Till Meyer: Radikales Amerika ("Radical America") 2007, ISBN 3-86789-010-2
- Bommi Baumann: Rausch und Terror. Ein persönlicher Erlebnisbericht ("Frenzy and Terror. A personal report") 2008, ISBN 3-86789-036-6

=== In English ===
- Bommi Baumann: Terror or Love? 1979, ISBN 0-7145-3782-9
- Bommi Bauman: How it all Began: The Personal Account of a West German Urban Guerrilla, reissued 1981, ISBN 978-0-88978-045-3, Arsenal Pulp Press

== See also ==
- Anarchism in Germany
