= Georg von Rauch Haus =

Squat in Berlin, Germany

Coordinates: 52°30′17″N 13°25′28″E

Georg von Rauch House
- Georg von Rauch Haus
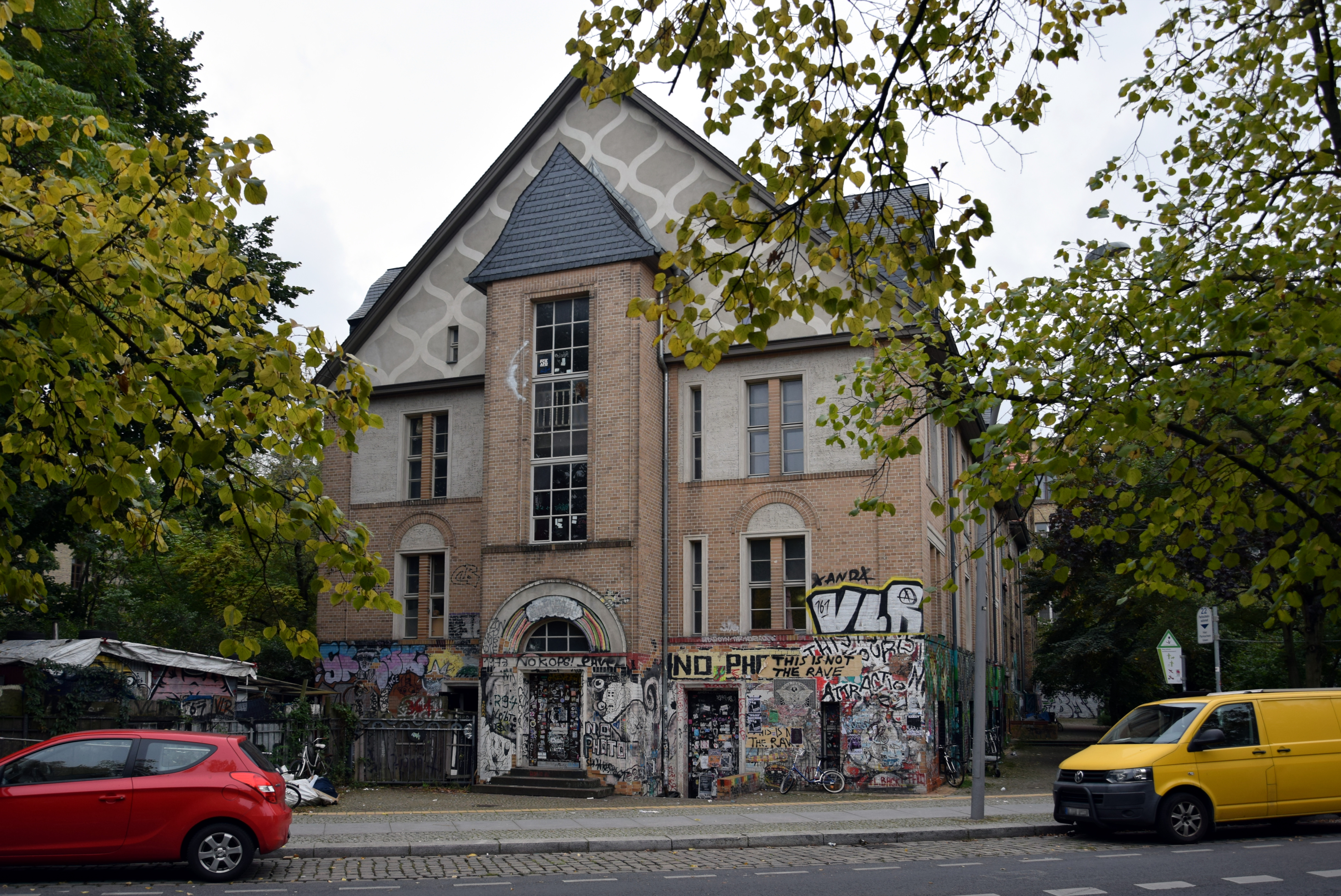
- The building in 2024
- Interactive map of the Georg von Rauch House area
- Former names: Martha Maria Haus

General information
- Location: 1A Bethaniendamm, Kreuzberg, Berlin, Germany
- Current tenants: Rauchhauskollektiv
- Named for: Georg von Rauch
- Inaugurated: December 1971

Design and construction
- Architect: Theodor August Stein

Georg von Rauch Haus, named after Georg von Rauch, is a squat in Kreuzberg, Berlin, established in 1971. It became an important center for the city's left-wing and countercultural milieu in the early 1970s.

== Building ==
The Georg von Rauch Haus was built as part of the Bethanien hospital at Mariannenplatz in Kreuzberg, Berlin. It was formerly a residence for nuns called the Martha Maria Haus, which was left derelict in 1970.

== Occupation ==
On December 8, 1971, a teach-in was organised at the Technische Universität Berlin to commemorate the death of activist Georg von Rauch. Following a concert by Ton Steine Scherben, the building was squatted by 300 people and named after von Rauch. It was one of the first squats in West Berlin. The squatters were young homeless people, students and workers.

The occupation was legalized by the local authorities and inspired Ton Steine Scherben's "Rauch-Haus-Song". It became an important center for the city's left-wing/countercultural milieu and was raided in 1972 by the police looking for Bommi Baumann.

== See also ==
- Tommy Weisbecker Haus
