= Georg von Rauch =

German anarchist (1947–1971)

- Born: 12 May 1947; Marburg, Southwest zone
- Died: 4 December 1971 (aged 24); Schöneberg, West Germany
- Cause of death: Gunshot wounds
- Monuments: Georg-von-Rauch-Haus
- Organization: 2 June Movement
- Movement: Anarchism
- Parents: Georg von Rauch (father); Margarethe Reimer (mother)

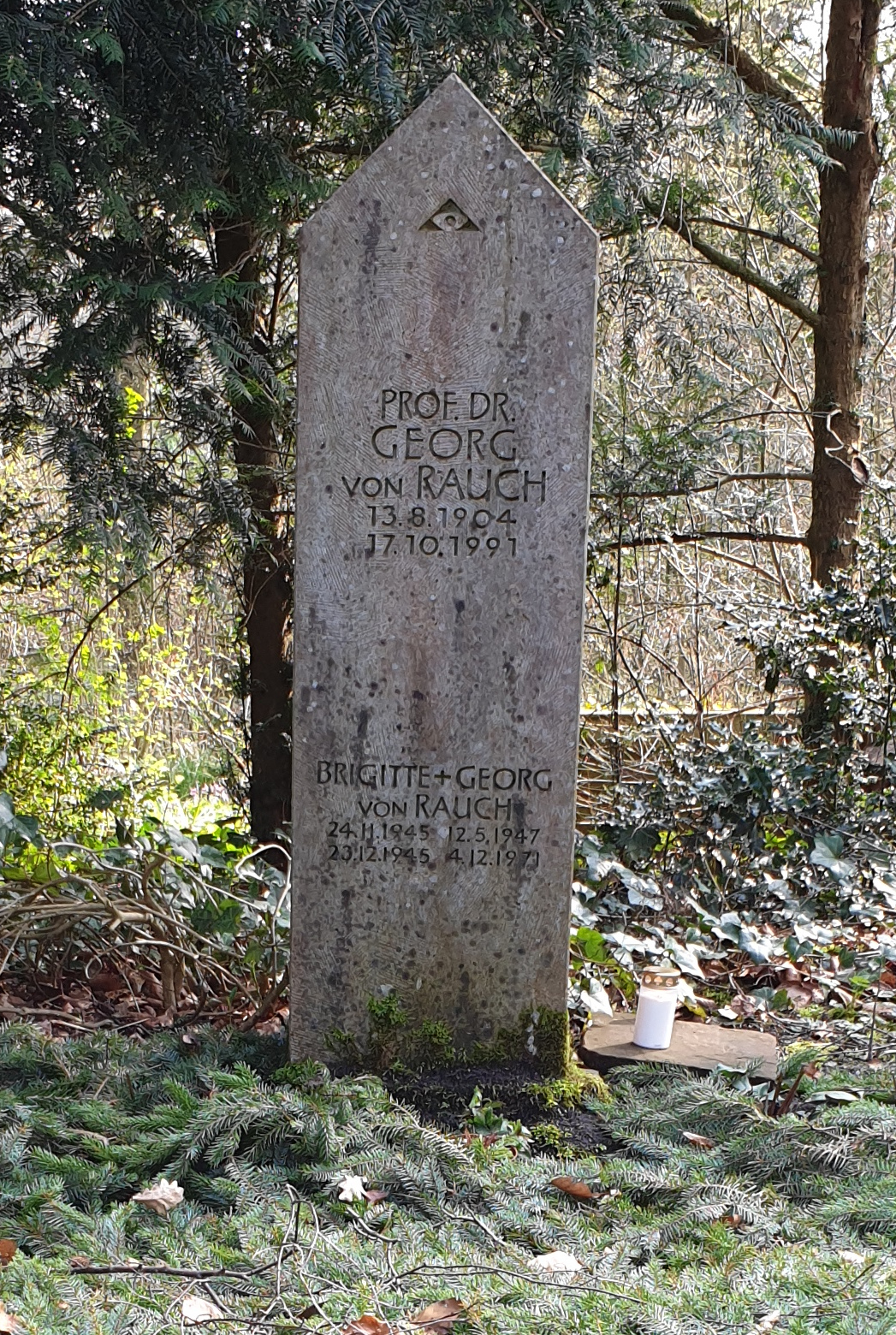
von Rauch's grave

Georg von Rauch (12 May 1947 – 4 December 1971) was a member of the 1960s-70s German student movement.

He was part of the 2 June Movement and a leader of the Tupamaros West-Berlin.

In 1970 he was arrested for assaulting a journalist. He was convicted but succeeded in fleeing the courtroom after the verdict was announced.

In December 1971, von Rauch and Bommi Baumann were pulled over by a West Berlin police officer. Von Rauch opened fire and was killed in the ensuing shootout.

The squat Georg-von-Rauch-Haus was founded shortly after his death and named in his honor.

His father was a history professor specializing in Russian and Baltic history.

== See also ==
- Rauch-Haus-Song
