= Dieter Kunzelmann =

German left-wing activist (1939–2018)

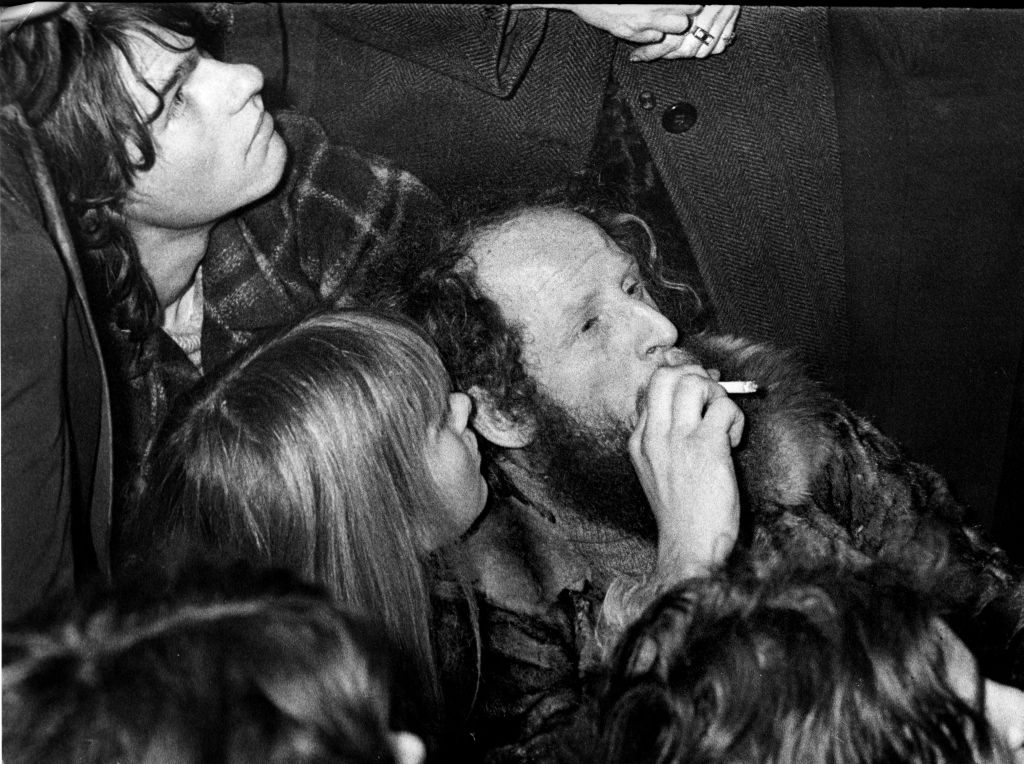
- Kunzelmann with Siepmann (left) during the student protests of 1968
- Born: 14 July 1939; Bamberg, Gau Bayreuth, Nazi Germany
- Died: 14 May 2018 (aged 78); Berlin, Germany
- Movement: Gruppe SPUR
- Partner: Ina Siepmann
- Organization: Kommune 1
- Political party: AL
- Other political affiliations: KPD (AO); TW; SDS; Subversive Action

Dieter Kunzelmann (14 July 1939 – 14 May 2018) was a German left-wing activist.

== Biography ==
=== Gruppe SPUR ===
In the early 1960s Kunzelmann was a member of the Situationist International-inspired artists' group Gruppe SPUR. Kunzelmann was recognized as the "chief theorist" of Gruppe SPUR, which was a artists' collective emerging out of Schwabing, a city borough in Munich famed for its creative scene. Gruppe SPUR understood itself as an assault against industrialized art and the political consensus of art commerce. In January 1959 Gruppe SPUR staged the "Bense-Happening", inviting an audience to listen to incomprehensible lectures by Max Bense on tape. Bense was astonished, when asked about the matter by journalists.

=== Socialist Students Union ===
Rudi Dutschke confronted the Subversive Action, abbreviated by the group itself as SA, as repulsive youth rebellion. Kunzelmann alongside Frank Böckelmann and Rodolphe Gasche had founded the Subversive Action in 1963. The Subversive Action was active in Munich, Frankfurt, Stuttgart, and West Berlin. Dutschke fought a bitter battle against the Subversive Action. Eventually Dutschke joined the Socialist Students Union (SDS) and the Subversive Action was welcomed into the SDS because the SDS lacked experience in civil disobedience and public disruption.

In September 1964 Kunzelmann and Dutschke agreed a program of action to abolish "the regime of the achievement principle (Leistungsprinzip) which is particularly manifest in the contaminated psyche of people living in a consumer society". This program of action was proposed to the SDS and Kunzelmann launched a subversive action campaign. Kunzelmann's agitators mounted a huge Mercedes star on an altar and a flyer was distributed claiming that "the Good Lord of the old days... has to arrange himself with the fetishes and become a sublime fetish of performance (Leistungsfetisch)". In December 1964, Subversive Action engaged customers in Munich shopping malls in provocative discussions and leaflets were distributed. In April 1965 a lengthy catalogue of questions was published on consumer society, claiming that consumption "is the primary influence on life".

Kunzelmann was expelled from the Subversive Action for "unsolidary and contemptible behavior" in April 1965. Kunzelmann went on to establish "Go-Ins" in Berlin, were activists engaged in walking demonstrations on crowded shopping streets, distributing anti-Vietnam War leaflets in gift wrapped boxes. Officially, these "Go-Ins" were a reaction to student demonstrations being banned from the city center. Shopping malls became the focus of political agitation, after Dutschke published a text on revolution in Latin America, advocating for the establishment of a countermilieu (Gegenmilieu).

=== Kommune 1 ===
Kunzelmann was one of the founders of Kommune 1 in 1967. In the late 1960s a series of militant and terrorist events were staged in West Berlin. Starting in autumn 1969 and continuing throughout the winter of 1970, 14 explosions have been recorded. Historians are arguing to this day, about whether Kunzelmann as key operator of the Far Left in West Berlin is to blame for instigating these acts of terrorism. Kommune 1 was a communal living group, that engaged in political opposition by means of lifestyle. Kunzelmann engaged the political Far Left with his critique of middle-class sensibility. Kommune 1 was staged initially in the home of Hans Magnus Enzensberger, and moved on to the apartment of Uwe Johnson. The biographer Aribert Reimann claims that Kunzelmann considered sexuality merely a "utopian reference point" and that sexual liberation was not possible in the given social circumstances. This logic was conveyed by Kunzelmann in long sessions of "self-criticism", known as Psycho-Amoks, and K1 residents were expected to take mandatory pledges of polygamy.

=== Tupamaros West-Berlin ===
At the end of the 1960s he was one of the leaders of the Tupamaros West-Berlin, which carried out bombings and arsons. He was arrested in July 1970 and served five years in prison for those activities.

=== Alternative List ===
From 1983 to 1985 he served in the Berlin state parliament as a member of the Alternative List (now Alliance '90/The Greens).

== Later years ==
In 1997 he was sentenced to a year in prison for throwing an egg at the mayor of Berlin, Eberhard Diepgen. He went into hiding for two years, reappearing to serve his sentence in 1999.
