= Tupamaros West-Berlin =

German urban guerrilla group

- Leaders: Dieter Kunzelmann; Georg von Rauch
- Founded: 2 November 1969
- Dissolved: 19 June 1970
- Country: West Germany
- Ideology: Marxism-Leninism; Guevarism; Antisemitism
- Size: c. 15

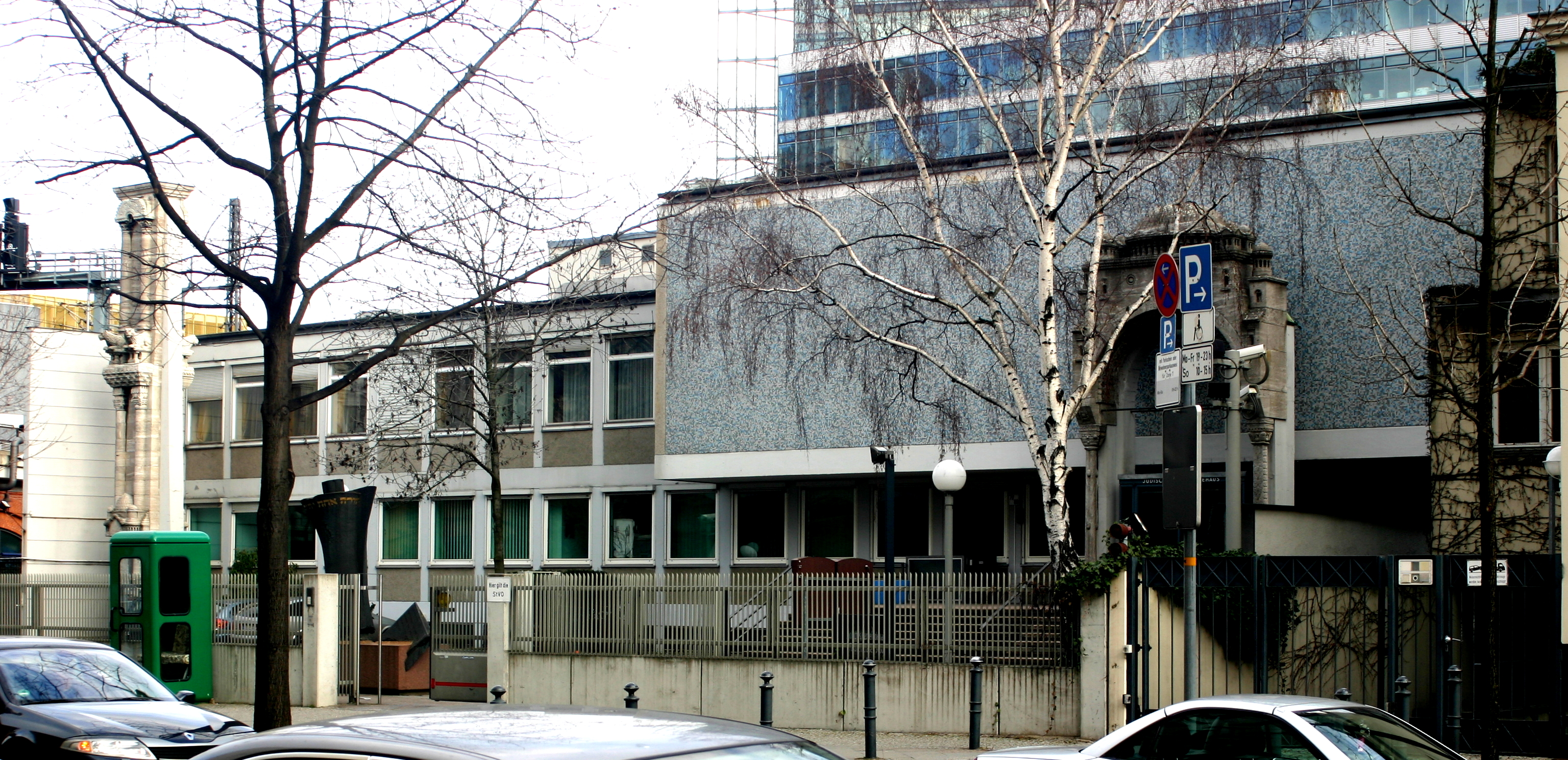
The target of the West Berlin Tupamaros' first attempted bombing, West Berlin's (then) Jewish Community Center.

The Tupamaros West-Berlin (TW) were a small German Marxist organization which carried out a series of bombings and arsons at the end of the 1960s. In 1969, Dieter Kunzelmann, Georg von Rauch, and a few others traveled to Jordan to train at a Fatah camp, forming the Tupamaros on their return to Germany. The group took their name from the Uruguayan Tupamaros. The TW had a core membership of about 15 people.

Their first action was an attempted bombing of West Berlin's Jewish Community Centre on 9 November 1969 (the anniversary of Kristallnacht); the bomb, supplied by the undercover government agent Peter Urbach, failed to explode. This was followed in the fall of 1969 by a number of bombings and arsons targeting police, judges, and US and Israeli targets. The TW claimed responsibility for these attacks under a variety of different names in order to exaggerate the size of their movement.

The group was led by Kunzelmann and von Rauch, and dissolved after the former was arrested in 1970 and the latter was killed by police in 1971. Its core members then formed the Movement 2 June, while some others joined the Red Army Faction.

== The Jewish Community Centre bombing attempt ==
Historian Wolfgang Kraushaar's 2005 book on the Tupamaros' attempted bombing of the West Berlin Jewish Community Centre set off a debate on antisemitism in the German student movement. The bombing was allegedly planned by Kunzelmann and the bomb itself planted by Albert Fichter, brother of the Sozialistischer Deutscher Studentenbund's then-chairman Tilman Fichter. On the date of the attempted bombing more than 200 people had gathered in the community center to commemorate the 31st anniversary of Kristallnacht. The bombing was planned as a way to turn the focus on the West German relationship with Israel and to fight what they described as an anti-fascist battle against Zionists.

== The Tupamaros Munich ==
Around the time of the TW's creation Fritz Teufel formed a similar group in Munich, the Tupamaros Munich (TM). Brigitte Mohnhaupt, later an important figure in the second generation of the RAF, was a member.
