= Peter Lorenz =

German politician (1922–1987)

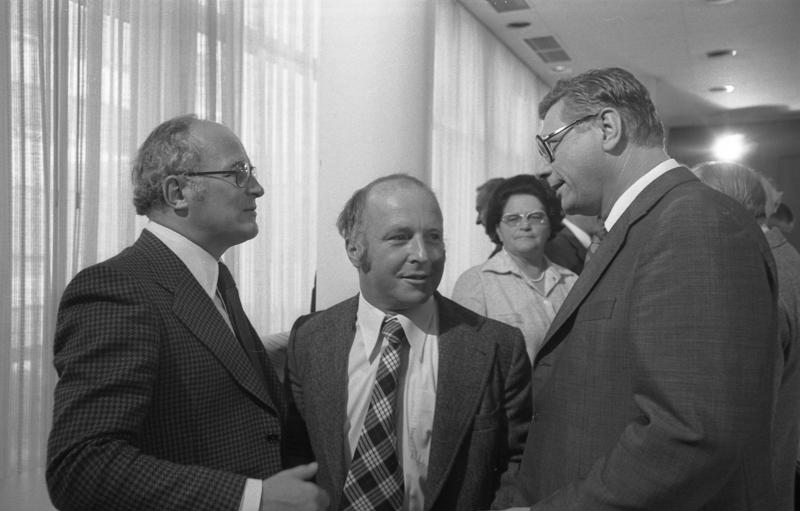
Peter Lorenz (right).

Peter Lorenz (22 December 1922 – 6 December 1987) was a German politician of the Christian Democratic Union (CDU).

In 1975 Lorenz was a candidate for mayor of West Berlin. He was kidnapped by the 2 June Movement group three days before the elections on 27 February. The group demanded a release of several imprisoned left-wing militants, including 2 June Movement members Verena Becker and Gabriele Kröcher-Tiedemann as well as Horst Mahler, one of the founders of the Red Army Faction (RAF) and Munich Tupamaros member Rolf Heissler. Although Mahler refused to be exchanged, the other prisoners were set free.

After the militants had been flown out to Aden, South Yemen, Lorenz was set free on 4 March. He had won the plurality (43.9%) of votes while being absent, nevertheless Klaus Schütz, relying on a coalition of Social Democrats and Free Democrats, remained mayor.

One of the freed prisoners, Rolf Heissler, became a member of the group which abducted Hanns-Martin Schleyer in 1977 to exchange him for imprisoned RAF members. After the operation had failed, Schleyer was killed. Heissler was one of his two murderers.

== See also ==
- List of kidnappings
- List of solved missing person cases

Political offices
Preceded by Walter Sickert	President of the Landtag of Berlin; 1975–1980	Succeeded by Heinrich Lummer
