= Killing of Benno Ohnesorg =

1967 West German police beating of a student

Benno Ohnesorg
- Born: 15 October 1940; Hanover, Germany
- Died: 2 June 1967 (aged 26); Charlottenburg, West Berlin, West Germany; 52°30′38.2″N 13°18′34.6″E
- Cause of death: Gunshot wounds
- Education: Freie Universität Berlin
- Occupation: Student

Benno Ohnesorg (German: [ˈbɛno ˈʔoːnəzɔɐ̯k]; 15 October 1940 – 2 June 1967) was a West German university student who was fatally shot in the back of the head by policeman Karl-Heinz Kurras during a demonstration in West Berlin. His death spurred the growth of the left-wing West German student movement.

== Incident ==
=== Protest ===
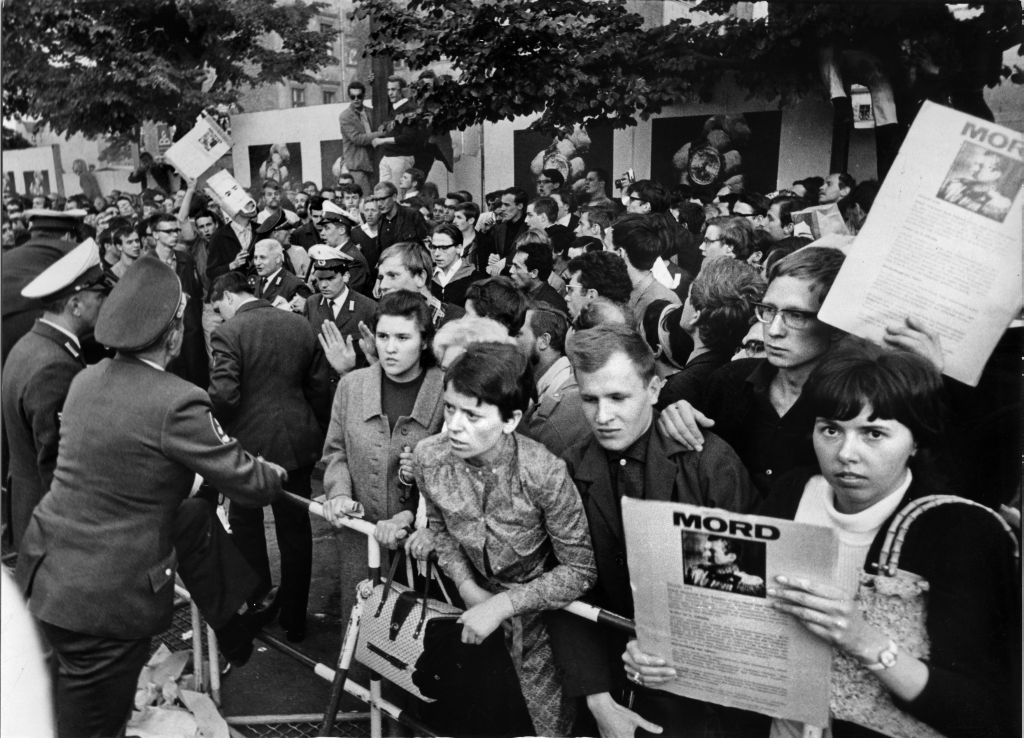
Protest against the Shah of Iran

On 2 June 1967, Ohnesorg participated in a student protest held near the Deutsche Oper in opposition to the state visit of the Shah of Iran, Mohammad Reza Pahlavi, who was attending a performance of Mozart's The Magic Flute at the Deutsche Oper that night. It was the first political demonstration in which Ohnesorg had ever taken part.

=== Violence and shooting ===
The protest turned violent after pro-Shah demonstrators, including agents of the Shah's intelligence service, began battling with students and the police overreacted, employing brutal tactics in their attempts to control the crowd. In the ensuing tumult, demonstrators dispersed into the side streets. In the courtyard of Krumme Straße 66, Ohnesorg was beaten by several police officers; with his hands raised, he was then shot in the back of the head by police officer Karl-Heinz Kurras. Police temporarily prevented medical treatment; Ohnesorg died in an ambulance before reaching a hospital. Hospital records were falsified and an unsuccessful attempt was made to physically cover up the bullet wound; however, it was discovered the next day in an official autopsy. Kurras stood trial the same year and was acquitted on 27 November 1967. Ohnesorg was a student of Romance and German studies. He was married and his wife was pregnant with their first child.

A week after Ohnesorg's death, a funeral caravan accompanied his coffin as it was transported from West Berlin through checkpoints in East Germany to his hometown of Hanover in West Germany, where he was buried.

== Re-investigation ==
More than forty years later, in 2009, it was revealed that at the time of the events Kurras had been an informal collaborator of the East German secret police Stasi and a long-time member of the Socialist Unity Party of Germany, the ruling East German Communist party; however, the motive behind Kurras' act remains unclear. The new information was based on documents discovered in the Stasi archives. Initial reports indicated that the archives contained no evidence that Kurras was acting under Stasi orders when he shot Ohnesorg.

On the basis of the 2009 revelations about Kurras, the German prosecutor's office initiated a new investigation, in order to clarify definitively whether there was any evidence that the killing of Ohnesorg could have been ordered by authorities in East Berlin; in November 2011, that investigation was officially closed with the determination that there was not enough evidence to justify reopening the case. The prosecutor's office noted that, due to the passage of time, many participants in the trial were either no longer alive or otherwise unable to provide reliable testimony, and that documents relevant to the case were evidently among those destroyed by the East German foreign intelligence service in the interval between the fall of the Berlin Wall in 1989 and German reunification in 1990.

Following up in January 2012, Der Spiegel magazine reported that research carried out by federal prosecutors, as well as by the magazine, found that the shooting was not in self-defense as always claimed by Kurras and that it was certainly premeditated. Newly examined film and photographic evidence also implicated fellow officers and superiors, demonstrating that the police covered up the truth in subsequent investigations and trials. Additionally, medical staff who carried out the autopsy on Ohnesorg were ordered to falsify their report. However, the Spiegel report indicated that the new information was still unlikely to be sufficient for the case to be reopened.

== Legacy ==
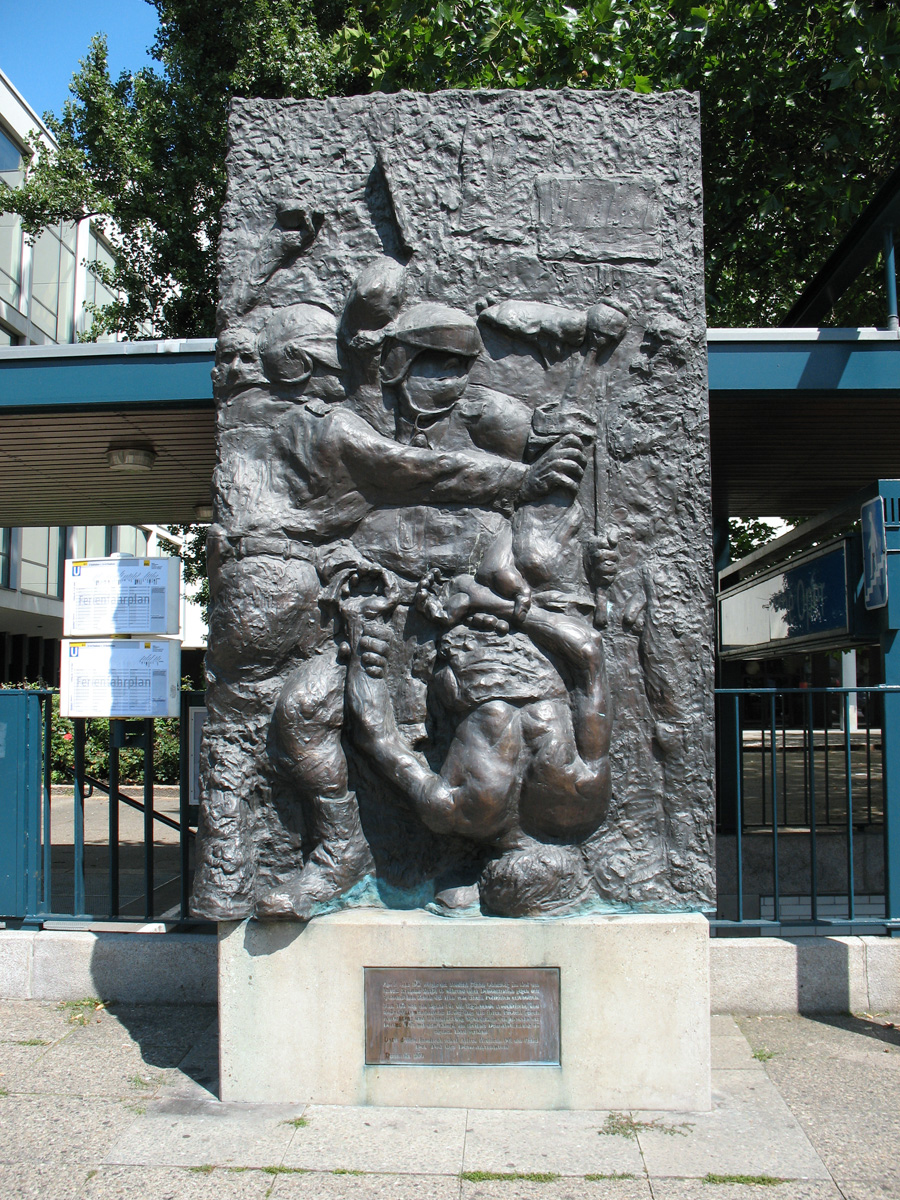
Relief Der Tod des Demonstranten (The Death of the Demonstrator) by Alfred Hrdlicka; Location: Deutsche Oper Berlin, forecourt

Ohnesorg's death served as a rallying point for the left, and spurred the growth of the left-wing German student movement. The Movement 2 June group, founded around 1971, was named for the day of his death.

Student activist Rudi Dutschke led student protest actions in the period following Ohnesorg's death. Just after Ohnesorg's burial in Hanover, Dutschke, speaking at "The University and Democracy: Conditions and Organization of Resistance" conference held at the university, clashed with philosophy professor Jürgen Habermas over the future of the movement: Dutschke advocated radical, possibly illegal and violent action, although his first proposal was a peaceful sit-down strike. The conflict prompted Habermas, who had urged a more moderate approach, famously to characterize Dutschke's ideology as amounting to "left fascism", a formulation that he later retracted.

The student movement that swelled and, in part, became radicalised in the late 1960s, after Ohnesorg's death, influenced many future German politicians who were in their teens and twenties at the time.

A monument next to the Deutsche Oper Berlin, which was designed by Austrian sculptor Alfred Hrdlicka, serves as a memorial for the killing. In December 2008, municipal authorities inaugurated an official memorial panel on the sidewalk in front of the house where Ohnesorg was shot, and in Ohnesorg's hometown of Hanover, a bridge over the Ihme river is named after him.

=== In film ===
The opening scene of the 2008 film Der Baader Meinhof Komplex shows Ohnesorg's death, with the role of Ohnesorg played by Martin Glade.

== See also ==
- West German student movement
