= Kommune 1 =

Political student commune in late-1960s West Berlin

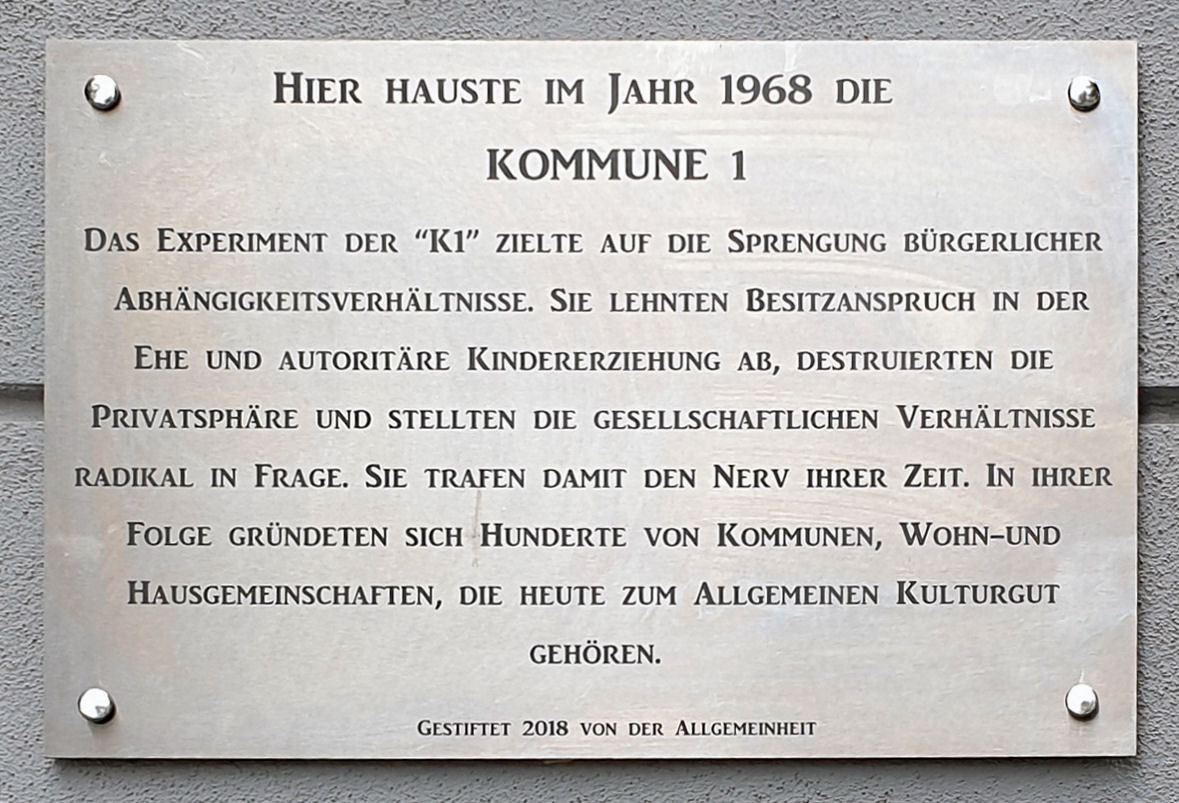
A memorial plaque at Kaiser-Friedrich-Straße 54A in Berlin-Charlottenburg.

Kommune 1 or K1 was a politically motivated commune in Germany. It was created on 12 January 1967, in West Berlin and finally dissolved in November 1969.

The commune was first located (from 19 February 1967, until the beginning of March 1967) in the empty apartment of the author Hans Magnus Enzensberger, in Fregestraße 19, as well as in the studio apartment of the author Uwe Johnson, who was staying in the United States, at Niedstraße 14 in the Berlin district of Friedenau. After Enzensberger's return from a long study trip to Moscow, they left his apartment and occupied the home of Johnson at Stierstraße 3 for a short time. They then moved to an apartment at Stuttgarter Platz and then finally moved to the second floor of the back of a tenement house in Stephanstraße 60 in the Berlin district of Moabit.

== Emergence ==
Dieter Kunzelmann had the idea of creating a commune. They decided to try a life of "those passionately interested in themselves". Kunzelmann soon moved to Berlin. In Berlin, the SDS had its first "commune working group", which advanced the following ideas:

- Fascism develops from the nuclear family. It is the smallest cell of the state from whose oppressive character all institutions are derived.
- Men and women live in dependence on each other so that neither could develop freely as people.
- This cell (that is, the small family) had to be shattered.

When it was proposed that this theory should be realized as the practice of a life as a commune, many SDS members left, including Dutschke and Rabehl, who did not want to give up their marriages and lifestyles. In the end, nine men and women, as well as a child, moved into the empty house of Hans Magnus Enzensberger in Fregestrasse 19 and the studio apartment of the author Uwe Johnson in Berlin-Friedenau, who was staying in New York City at the time, on 19 February 1967. After Enzensberger's return from an extended study trip to Moscow, the communards left and occupied the main residence of Johnson in the nearby Stierstraße 3. They called themselves Kommune 1.

The early communards included the leader and main driving force Dieter Kunzelmann, Fritz Teufel, Dagrun Enzensberger (divorced wife of Hans Magnus Enzensberger), Tanaquil Enzensberger (nine years old at that time, daughter of Enzensberger), Ulrich Enzensberger (Hans Magnus Enzensberger's brother), Detlef Michel (until 25 March 1967), Volker Gebbert, Hans-Joachim Hameister, Dorothea Ridder ("the iron Dorothee"), Dagmar Seehuber and. Rainer Langhans joined in March 1967.

=== The "Pudding Assassination" ===
Police files indicate that a planned attack was revealed by a Secret Service agent, and eleven students were arrested by officials of Division I (Political Police) on 5 April 1967. They were supposed to have met under conspiratorial conditions and planned attacks against the life or health of Hubert Humphrey by means of bombs, plastic bags filled with unknown chemicals, or with other dangerous tools, such as stones. The students however planned to throw bags with pudding, flour and yogurt at Humphrey as an act of satirical protest. Those arrested were Ulrich Enzensberger, Volker Gebbert, Klaus Gilgenmann, Hans-Joachim Hameister, Wulf Krause, Dieter Kunzelmann, Rainer Langhans and Fritz Teufel, and were released shortly after.

=== The "Arsonist's Lawsuit" ===
On 22 May 1967 a department store fire in Brussels caused 251 deaths. Maoists and anti-Vietnam war protesters were soon accused of having set the fire. Kommune 1 reacted with flyers, describing "new forms of protest", writing "Holt euch das knisternde Vietnam-Gefühl, das wir auch hier nicht missen wollen!" ("Catch that crackling Vietnam feeling that we would not want to miss at home!") and asking "when do the Berlin department stores burn?" On 6 June 1967, the "Arsonist's Lawsuit" was filed against Langhans and Teufel, charging them with calling for arson. After testimony of numerous literature professors, who characterized the flyers as fiction and surrealist provocation, the court ultimately ruled in favor of Langhans and Teufel.

== The second phase: sex, drugs and Uschi Obermaier ==
In May 1968, Kommune I: Quellen zur Kommune Forschung was published by members of the commune. Intended to provide a retrospective look at what had been achieved since the commune's inception, the publication contained 26 of the fliers produced by the group in addition to various other news articles and documents relating to the commune's activities. The pamphlet is one of a scarce amount of documents published by members of the commune. It served as the bookend before the second phase of Kommune 1 began.

On 21 September 1968, the commune went to the International Song Days in Essen, the Federal Republic's first underground festival. There, Langhans met and fell in love with Uschi Obermaier, a model from Munich. She lived with the Munich-based music commune Amon Düül, but soon moved in with the communards of Kommune 1, who shared one bedroom. Soon, the press called Langhans and Obermaier the "best-looking couple of the APO". Kunzelmann did not like the openly apolitical Obermaier.

The politicization of the private sphere and the fact that Langhans and Obermaier spoke openly to the media about their relationship, about jealousy, and about "pleasure machines" constituted the next breaking of social taboos, ushering in the sexual revolution. Later, John Lennon and Yoko Ono and others followed their example.

All of a sudden, the commune was receiving visitors from all over the world, among them Jimi Hendrix, who turned up one morning in the bedroom of Kommune 1. Obermaier fell in love with him.

== The end of Kommune 1 and its legacy ==
Eventually, the energy of Kommune 1 was spent. Kunzelmann's addiction to heroin worsened and in summer 1969 he was expelled from the commune.

In November 1969, a gang of three Rockers raided the commune and destroyed the rooms. They had earlier helped Langhans in expelling some unwanted people from the commune, and now came back to claim their share of the 50,000 Marks that Stern supposedly had paid. The remaining occupants lost their belief in the future of Kommune 1 and dispersed. Obermaier and Langhans went to Munich.

== See also ==
- Counterculture of the 1960s
- New left
- Amon Düül
- Uschi Obermaier
- Chaos Computer Club
- Autonomism

== Literature ==
- Boyle, Michael Shane. 2011. "Aura and the Archive: Confront the Incendiary Fliers of Kommune 1," in Performing Arts Resources: The Tyranny of Documents–The Performance Historian as Film Noir Detective, Ed. Stephen Johnson, New York: Theatre Library Association.
- Enzensberger, Ulrich (2006). Die Jahre der Kommune I: Berlin 1967 - 1969. Goldmann. ISBN 9783442153619.
- Fahlenbrach, Kathrin. 2004. The Aesthetics of Protest in the Media of 1968 in Germany (conference paper). Proceedings, IX International Congress of the International Society for the Empirical Study of Literature, 2004. Available from: https://web.archive.org/web/20080530161833/http://www.arts.ualberta.ca/igel/igel2004/Proceedings/Fahlenbrach.pdf (PDF)
- Rabehl, Bernd. 2003. Die Provokationselite: Aufbruch und Scheitern der subversiven Rebellion in den sechziger Jahren. (Teil 2: Die Revolte in der Revolte: Die Kommune 1.)
- Martin Klimke, Joachim Scharloth (eds.).2007. 1968. Ein Handbuch zur Kultur- und Mediengeschichte der Studentenbewegung. Stuttgart: Metzler. ISBN 3-476-02066-5
- Dressen, Wolfgang; Kunzelmann, Dieter; Siepmann, Eckhard; Berlin, Werkbund-Archiv (1991). Nilpferd des höllischen Urwalds: Spuren in eine [sic] unbekannte Stadt : Situationisten Gruppe SPUR Kommune I : Ein Ausstellungsgeflecht des Werkbund-Archivs Berlin zwischen Kreuzberg und Scheunenviertel, November 1991.
- Rainer Langhans, Fritz Teufel: Klau mich. StPO der Kommune I. Edition Voltaire, Frankfurt am Main and Berlin 1968 (Series: Voltaire Handbuch 2), Reprint (without pornographic insert): Trikont Verlag, Munich 1977; Rixdorfer Verlagsanstalt, Berlin undated [1982]
- Christa Ritter, Rainer Langhans: Herz der Revolte. Die Kommune 1 von 1967 bis 1969. Hannibal Verlag, 2005, ISBN 3-85445-258-6.
- Peter Szondi: Aufforderung zur Brandstiftung. Ein Gutachten im Prozeß Langhans / Teufel. in: Der Monat, Berlin, 19th year, issue 7, 1967, p. 24-29, also printed in: Peter Szondi: Über eine "Freie (d. h. freie) Universität". Stellungnahmen eines Philologen. Suhrkamp Verlag, Frankfurt am Main 1973 (Series: es 620)
- Josep Mº Carandell: Las comunas, alternativa a la familia, Barcelona, Tusquets, 1972.
