= West German student movement =

1968 anti-government mass protests by West German students

- Part of the protests of 1968
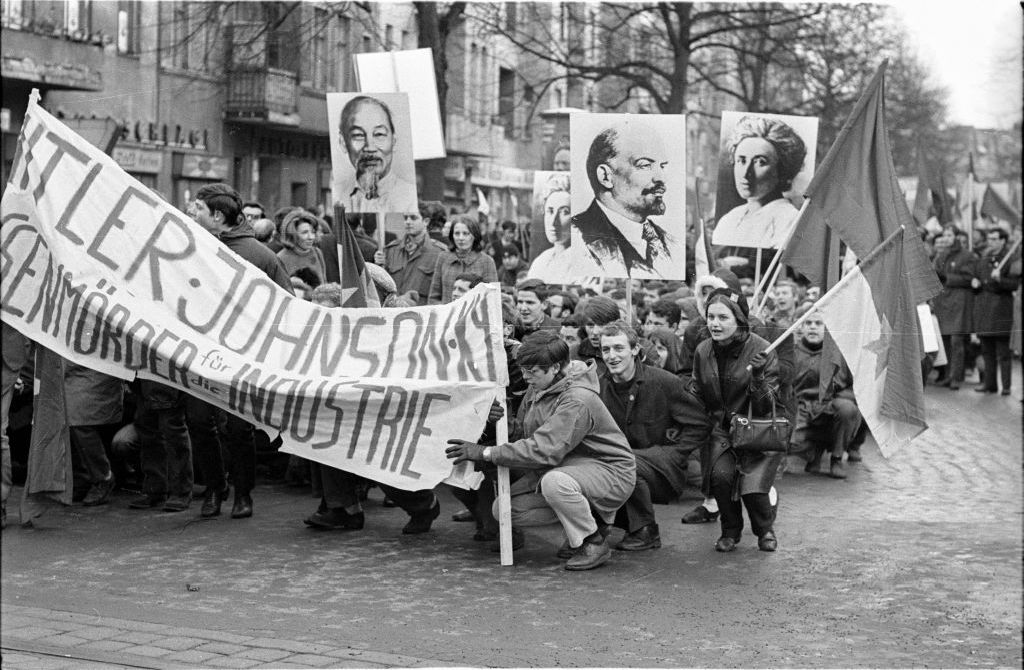
- Protest march in 1968 West Germany
- Date: 1968
- Location: West Germany
- Caused by: New political alliances in West Germany; Various leftist political movements
- Result: Quelling of protests

The West German student movement (German: Westdeutsche Studentenbewegung), sometimes called the 1968 movement in West Germany (German: 1968 Bewegung in Westdeutschland), was a left-wing social movement that consisted of mass student protests in West Germany in 1968. Participants in the movement later came to be known as 68ers. The movement was characterized by the protesting students' rejection of traditionalism and of German political authority which included many former Nazi officials. Student unrest had started in 1967 when student Benno Ohnesorg was fatally shot by a policeman during a protest against the visit of Mohammad Reza Pahlavi, the Shah of Iran. The movement is considered to have formally started after the attempted assassination of student activist leader Rudi Dutschke, which sparked various protests across West Germany and gave rise to public opposition. The movement created lasting changes in German culture.

== Background ==
=== Political atmosphere ===
The Spiegel affair of 1962, in which journalists were arrested and detained for reporting on the strength of the West German military, worried some in West Germany that there was a return of authoritarian government. In the fallout of the affair, the suddenly-unpopular Christian Democratic Union formed a political coalition with the Social Democratic Party (SPD), known as the grand coalition.

Critics were disappointed with the parliament's appointment of Kurt Georg Kiesinger as chancellor of West Germany, as he had participated in the Nazi Party during the Nazi regime.

=== New political movements ===
Social movements grew as younger people became disillusioned with the political establishment, worrying it was reminiscent of Germany's Nazi past. West Berlin became a center for these movements since many left leaning people would take residence in West Berlin to avoid the military draft that was in effect in the rest of West Germany.

These social movements were also becoming popular among the youth of West Germany. The movements included the opposition to the United States' involvement in the Vietnam War, opposition to consumer culture, liberation for the third world, and criticisms of middle class moral values. Some were embracing communal lifestyles and sexual liberation. All these various social movements and the non-parliamentary organizations that hoped to spearhead them, grouped together as the Außerparlamentarische Opposition. The more leftist wing of the SDP in the Sozialistischer Deutscher Studentenbund (SDS; Socialist German Students' Union) split from the party line and joined the Außerparlamentarische Opposition.

In 1965, Rudi Dutschke was elected to the political council of the West Berlin SDS. With Michael Vester, SDS vice-president and international secretary, Dutschke imported ideas from the American SDS (Students for a Democratic Society) and New Left, such as direct action and civil disobedience. Drawing inspiration from Herbert Marcuse, Dutschke sought to build a coalition of marginalized identity groups to be a vanguard for socialism in Europe. Finding that Germany had no population group with revolutionary potential comparable to America's Black power movement, Dutschke sought to mold Germany's student movements into seeing themselves as an oppressed minority. His plan for accomplishing this was to provoke violent confrontations with government authorities. He wrote in 1965, "Authorized demonstrations must be guided into illegality. Confrontation with state power is essential and must be sought out."

=== 1966–1968 protests ===
The West German parliament had proposed to expand government powers in the Emergency Laws, as well as to reform universities. On 22 June 1966, 3,000 students from the Free University of Berlin staged a sit-in to demand involvement in the reform process of universities, included democratic management of colleges.

Echoing Marcuse, Rudi Dutschke considered the politically complacent working classes to be a lost cause when it came to revolutionary agitation. Instead, he hoped to build a coalition between Western intelligentsia and third world communist revolutionaries. To that end, Dutschke organized the event "Vietnam – Analysis of an Example" (German: Vietnam – Analyse eines Exempels) at the University of Frankfurt Institute for Social Research with Marcuse as the headline speaker. SDS president Walmot Falkenburg privately requested that Marcuse emphasize solidarity with the Vietnamese on the basis of traditional Marxist concerns with labor and material interests, which would have been a rebuke of Dutschke and his associates in the West Berlin SDS chapter. Unsurprisingly, Marcuse did the opposite in a speech emphasizing "solidarity of sentiment". The event was followed by street demonstrations which led to the arrests of Dutschke, his wife, and 84 others.

In June 1967, during a state visit by the Shah of Iran Mohammad Reza Pahlavi, the SDS organized a protest of his visit, criticizing him as a brutal dictator that should not have been welcome in West Germany. The protest was repressed by police and Iranian agents who beat protesters and resulted in the fatal shooting of Benno Ohnesorg. The police officer involved, Karl-Heinz Kurras, was acquitted on the grounds of self-defense. Protests against police brutality erupted across the country and led the mayor of Berlin and the police chief to resign. In the fall of 1967 students established "Critical Universities"; students occupied classrooms and gave critiques of university structure as well as educating other students in New Left thought. It was revealed in 2009 that Kurras had been a Stasi informant. Prosecutors revisiting the evidence concluded Ohnesorg had been murdered as a premeditated act, but not enough evidence survived to evaluate whether Kurras was acting under official orders.

On the occasion of Ohnesorg's funeral, a conference was held which is most remembered for a debate between Rudi Dutschke and Jürgen Habermas. Dutschke argued that the time was ripe for students to engage in direct action. Habermas, although generally sympathetic to the student movements, criticized Dutschke's plan as action for its own sake without regard for consequences. When Dutschke would not clarify his stance on employing violence, Habermas accused him of Linksfaschismus ("Left fascism"). Later, during the German Autumn of 1977, Habermas said the charge of fascism had been an overreaction.

At a conference in September 1967, Dutschke and Hans-Jürgen Krahl called for the creation of "action centers" at universities to organize "urban guerrillas". The International Vietnam Congress (German: Internationaler Vietnamkongress) was an event that took place in West Berlin on 17 and 18 February 1968 to oppose the Vietnam War. It was organized by Rudi Dutschke and Karl Dietrich Wolff, with an estimated 3,000–4,000 people attending the conference and a total of 12,000–15,000 people involved in the following demonstration. At the congress, Dutschke and his Chilean friend Gaston Salvatore presented their translation of Che Guevara's letter to the Tricontinental Conference, which called for bloody guerrilla warfare against the United States. Holger Meins presented an instructional film on making Molotov cocktails.

=== Attempted assassination of Rudi Dutschke ===
On 11 April 1968, Rudi Dutschke was shot by the far-right Josef Bachmann. Dutschke was injured but survived the shooting. The attempted assassination of Dutschke would be later regarded as the formal beginning of the West German student movement. Dutschke had previously been labeled an "enemy of the people" in the Axel Springer–owned tabloid newspaper Bild-Zeitung. Student activists believed the shooting was inspired by critics of the student movement such as Springer's tabloids. Demonstrations and clashes later occurred outside Springer offices in reaction to the shooting. In the aftermath of the shooting, student leaders became more willing to embrace violent tactics in their movements. With Dutschke incapacitated, many in the SDS looked to Hans-Jürgen Krahl for leadership. Krahl however favored theory to direct action.

=== Emergency Acts protests ===
In May the West German government considered using the Emergency Acts in response, allowing the Cabinet to suspend parliamentary rule and enact laws in times of crisis. On May 11 protesters gathered in the West German capital Bonn to demand that the laws not be used. The government agreed with protesting labor unions to only use limited concessions, passing the laws on May 30. This agreement dealt a blow to the growing student movement and signaled its demise. The SDS formally dissolved on March 21, 1970.

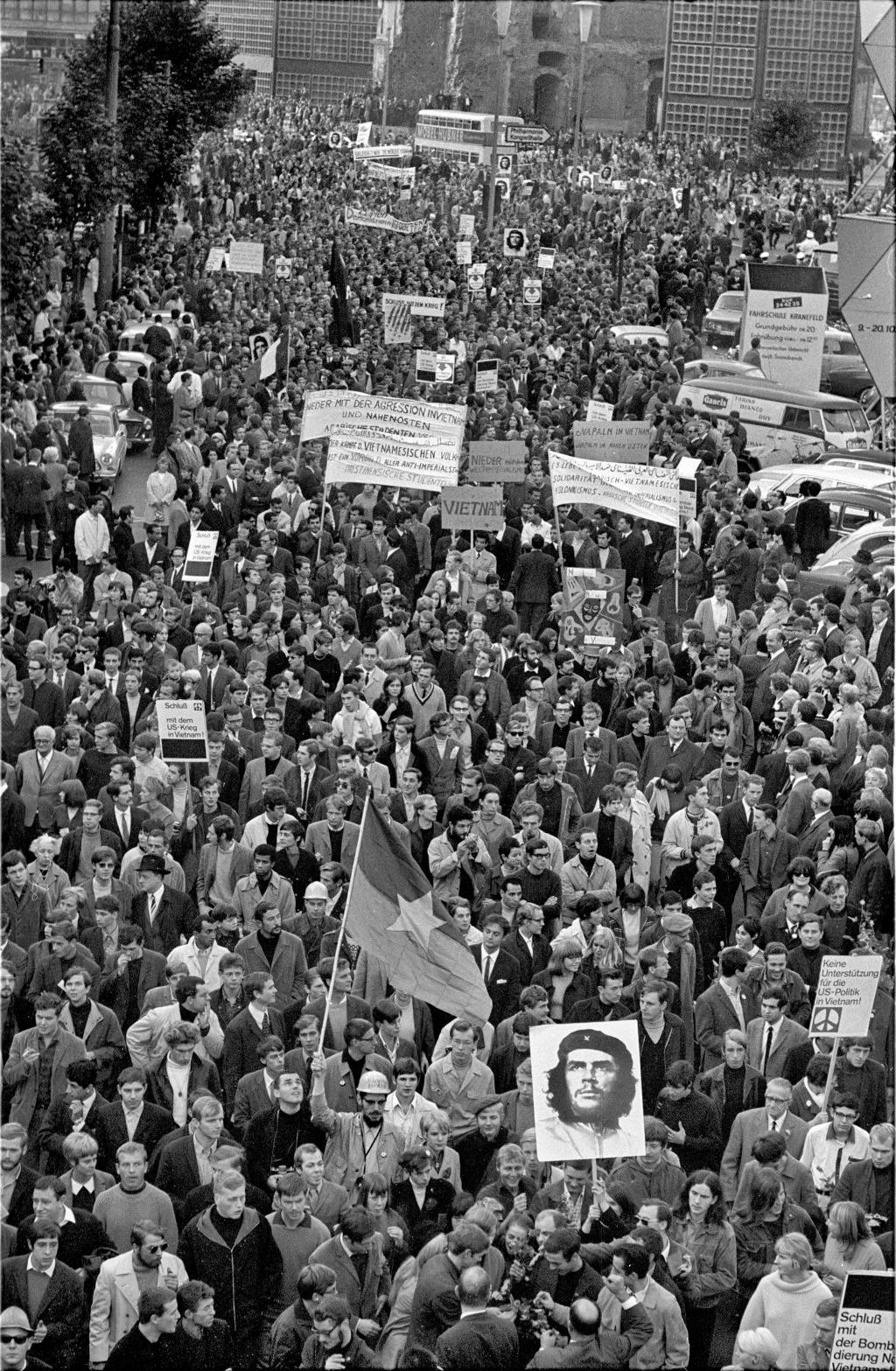
Protest against the Vietnam War

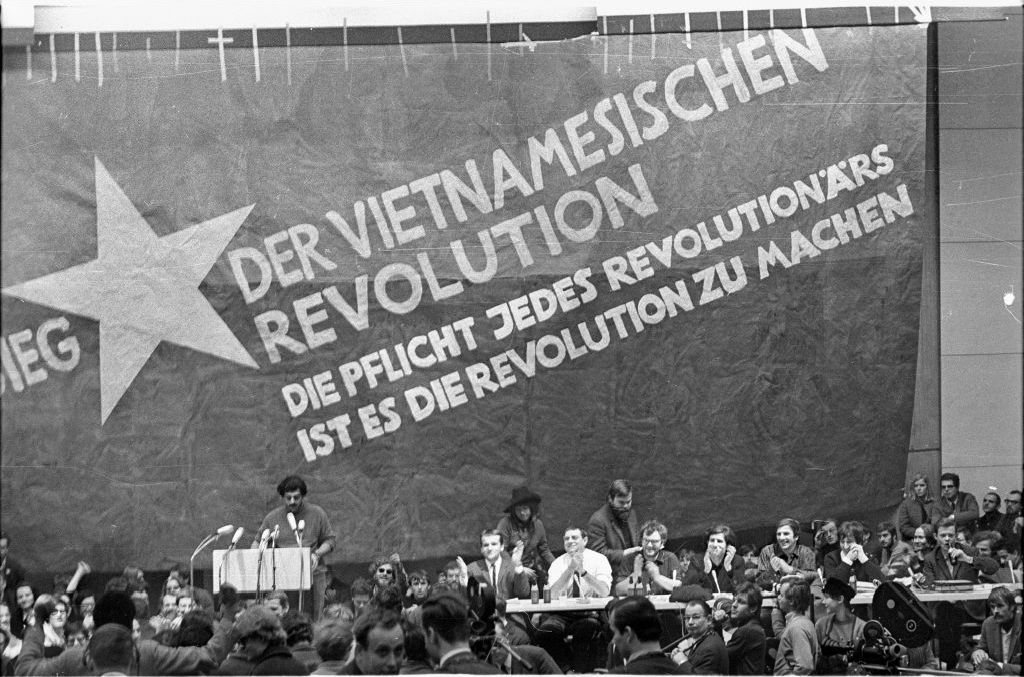
Conference to protest the Vietnam War

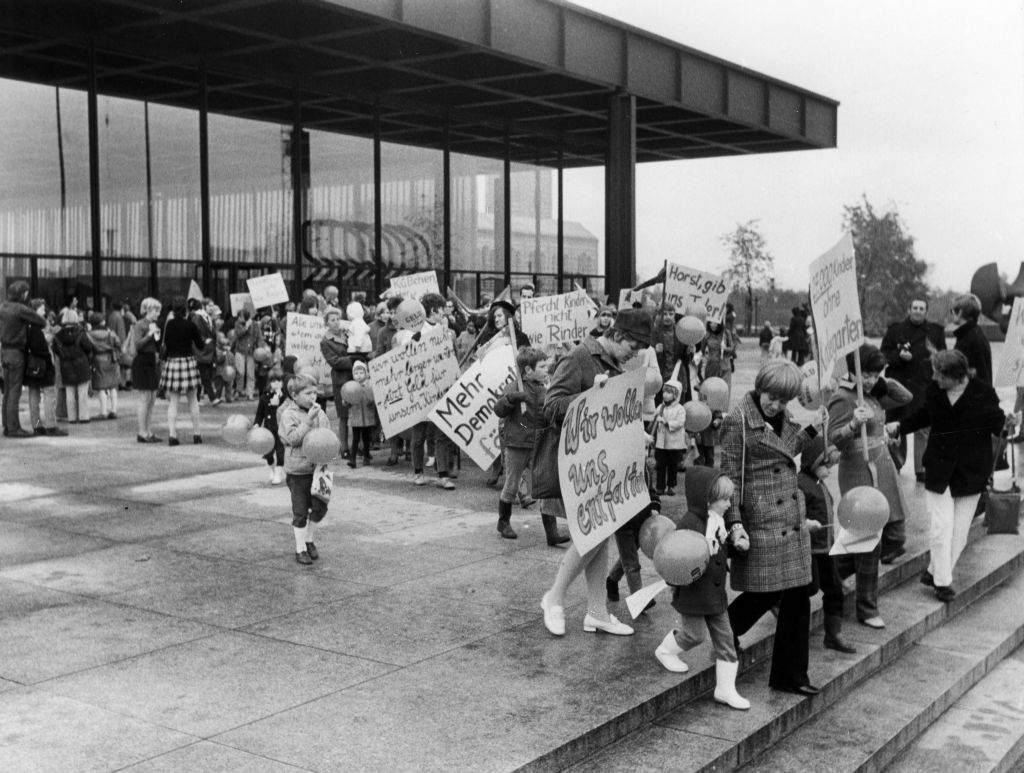
Protest march in West Berlin

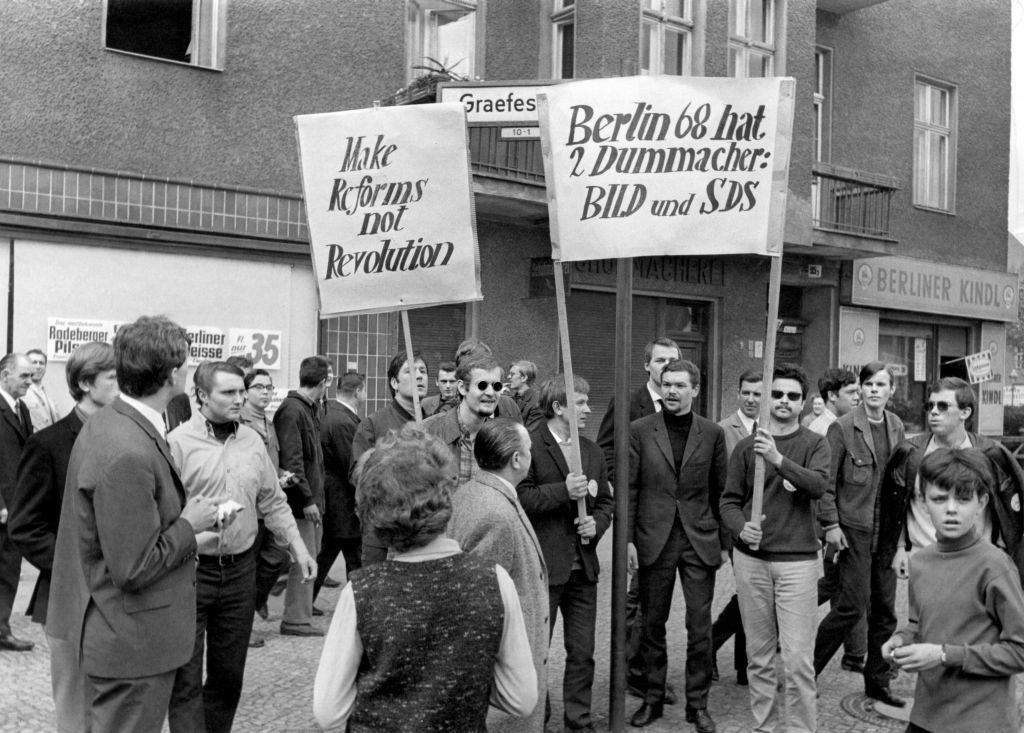
Demonstrators in West Berlin

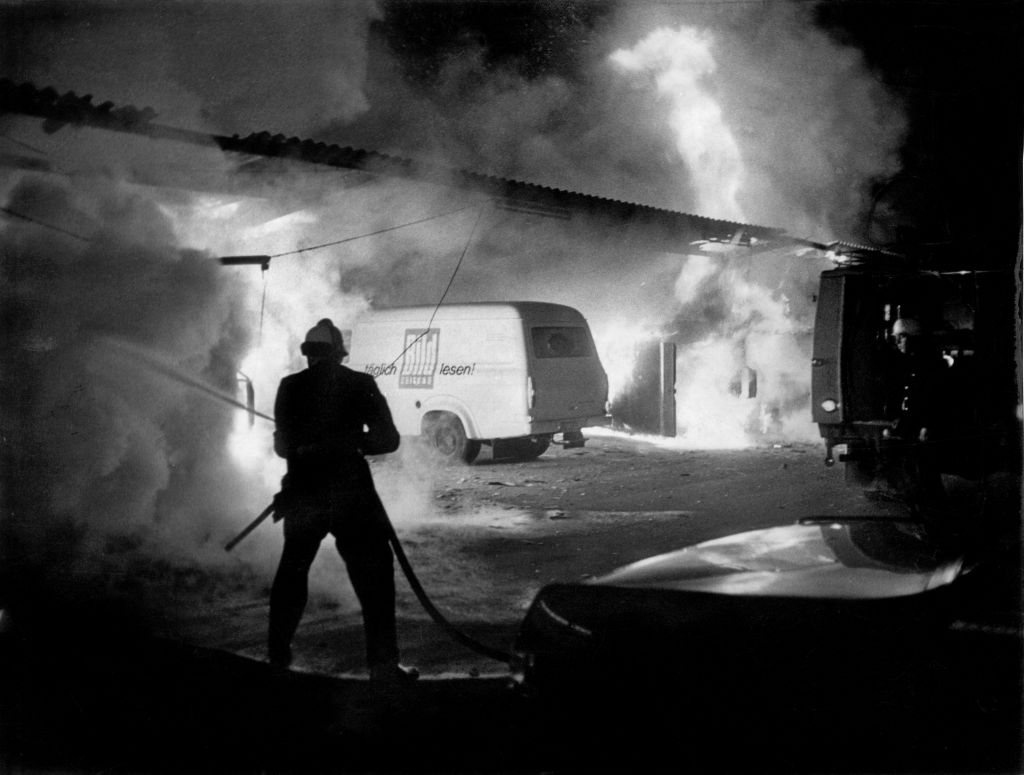
Vandalized Bild-Zeitung delivery cars

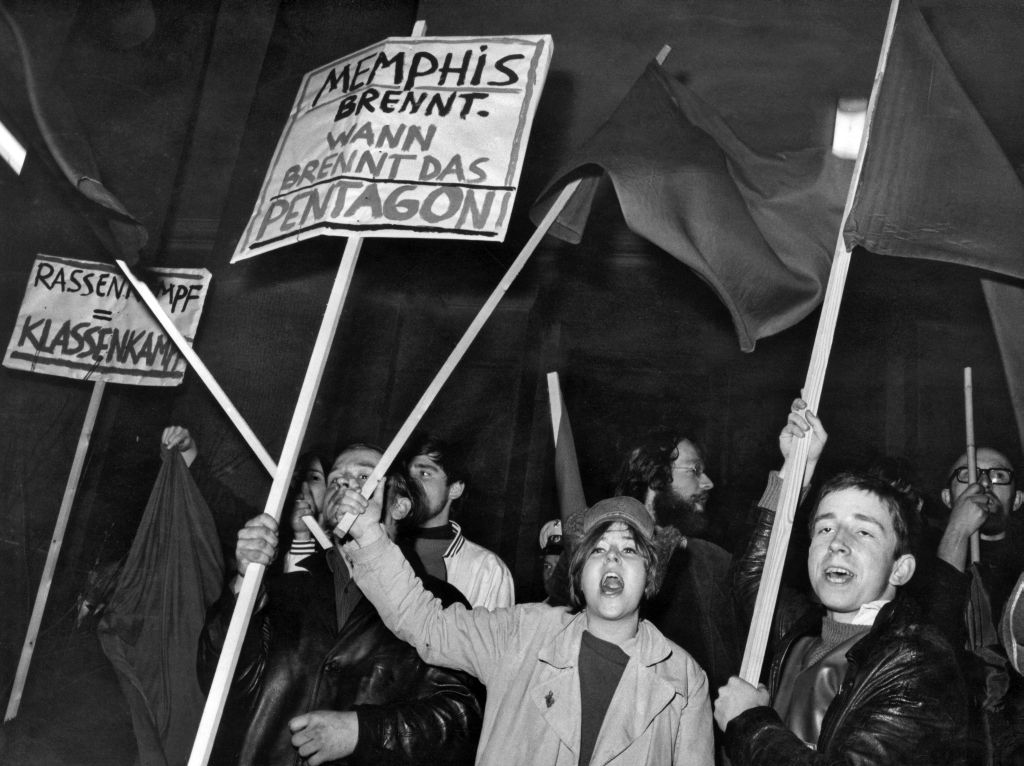
Protesters with signs

== Aftermath ==
=== Terrorism ===
On 22 May 1967, a fire at the L'Innovation department store in Brussels killed hundreds of people. Kommune 1 issued a leaflet celebrating the fire and calling for more such occurrences to bring parity between Western countries and Vietnam. The leaflet was widely condemened and caused a split between Kommune 1 and the SDS. On 2 April 1968, members of the Außerparlamentarische Opposition, Andreas Baader and Gudrun Ensslin committed arson at a department store in Frankfurt to protest the Vietnam war. Although convicted, they were released while pursuing an appeal and went underground when it was denied. They were joined by Ulrike Meinhof in forming the Red Army Faction, which continued to engage in arson and other terrorist acts for more than a decade. Dutschke, Enzensberger, and Nirumand wrote an apologia for terrorism based on Walter Benjamin's Critique of Violence and Herbert Marcuse's Repressive Tolerance.

=== Political consciousness ===
Despite the failure of the student movement, a change in political consciousness lasted throughout the country. Criticisms of West German officials' ties to the old Nazi Party brought the concept of Vergangenheitsbewältigung (coming to terms with the past) to the forefront of political discussion. Other various left-wing causes also gained popularity and helped solidify a protest culture in Germany.

Those who were involved in the protests of 1968 in West Germany would come to be known as the "1968 generation". Some would develop unique political paths, with some finding roles in government, while others embraced terrorist activities of the Außerparlamentarische Opposition.

== See also ==
- Anarchism
- Daniel Cohn-Bendit
- Elmar Altvater
- Ernest Mandel
- Joschka Fischer
- Marxist Group (Germany)
- Peter-Ernst Eiffe
- Peter Schneider (writer)
- Spaßguerilla

== Sources ==
- Peter Dohms, Johann Paul. Die Studentenbewegung von 1968 in Nordrhein-Westfalen. Siegburg: Rheinlandia, 2008 ISBN 978-3-938535-53-0
- Martin Klimke, Joachim Scharloth (eds.). 2007. 1968. Ein Handbuch zur Kultur- und Mediengeschichte der Studentenbewegung. Stuttgart: Metzler. ISBN 3-476-02066-5
- Tony Judt. 2005. Postwar: A History of Europe Since 1945. New York: Penguin Group ISBN 1-59420-065-3
