= Dutschke =

Dutschke is a surname. Notable people with the surname include:

- Gretchen Dutschke-Klotz (born 1942), German-American author and former activist
- James Everett Dutschke (born 1971/72), American arrested in the 2013 ricin-letters case
- Rudi Dutschke (1940–1979), German sociologist and political activist
