= Dietze =

Dietze is a surname. Notable people with the surname include:

- Constantin von Dietze (1891-1973), agronomist, lawyer, economist, and theologian
- Elke Dietze, West German slalom canoeist who competed at the international level in 1979
- Gabriele Dietze (born 1951) German cultural scientist, university teacher, gender -theorist, essayist and author.
- Julia Dietze (born 1981), German actress
- Jürgen Dietze (born 1942), German swimmer
- Mike Dietze (born 1989), American soccer player
- Otto Dietze (1833-1890), German-born architect
- Tina Dietze (born 1988), German sprint canoer
