= Nuthe-Urstromtal =

- Municipality
- Coat of arms

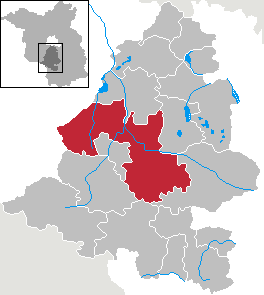
- Location of Nuthe-Urstromtal within Teltow-Fläming district
- Interactive map of Nuthe-Urstromtal
- Location within Germany Location within Brandenburg
- Coordinates: 52°07′00″N 13°11′59″E
- Country: Germany
- State: Brandenburg
- District: Teltow-Fläming
- Subdivisions: 23 Ortsteile

Government
  - Mayor (2017–25): Stefan Scheddin

Area
  - Total: 337.84 km^{2} (130.44 sq mi)
- Elevation: 42 m (138 ft)

Population (2025-12-31)
  - Total: 6,249
  - Density: 18.50/km^{2} (47.91/sq mi)
- Time zone: UTC+01:00 (CET)
  - Summer (DST): UTC+02:00 (CEST)
- Postal codes: 14947
- Dialling codes: 03371
- Vehicle registration: TF
- Website: www.nuthe-urstromtal.de

Nuthe-Urstromtal is a municipality in the Teltow-Fläming district of Brandenburg, Germany. By area, it is the largest rural municipality ("Gemeinde") in Germany.

== Demography ==
Development of Population since 1875 within the Current Boundaries (Blue Line: Population; Dotted Line: Comparison to Population Development of Brandenburg state; Grey Background: Time of Nazi rule; Red Background: Time of Communist rule)

Recent Population Development and Projections (Population Development before Census 2011 (blue line); Recent Population Development according to the Census in Germany in 2011 (blue bordered line); Projection by the Brandenburg state for 2005-2030 (yellow line); Projection by the Brandenburg state for 2017-2030 (scarlet line); Projection by the Brandenburg state for 2020-2030 (green line)

Nuthe-Urstromtal: Population development
within the current boundaries (2020)

Year	Pop.	±% p.a.
1875	7,171	—
1890	7,238	+0.06%
1910	7,516	+0.19%
1925	7,594	+0.07%
1939	8,108	+0.47%
1950	10,284	+2.18%
1964	8,287	−1.53%

Year	Pop.	±% p.a.
1971	8,025	−0.46%
1981	7,543	−0.62%
1985	7,325	−0.73%
1990	7,047	−0.77%
1995	7,148	+0.29%
2000	7,371	+0.62%
2005	7,165	−0.57%

Year	Pop.	±% p.a.
2010	6,790	−1.07%
2015	6,703	−0.26%
2016	6,623	−1.19%
2017	6,578	−0.68%
2018	6,603	+0.38%
2019	6,564	−0.59%
2020	6,565	+0.02%

== People ==
- Rudi Dutschke (1940 in Schönefeld -1979), German Marxist sociologist and a political activist
