= Agit 883 =

German anarchist journal

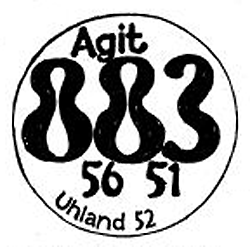
- Editor: Dirk Schneider
- Founded: February 1969
- Ceased publication: February 1972
- Political alignment: Anarchism
- Language: German
- Headquarters: 52 Uhlandstraße, Wilmersdorf
- City: West Berlin
- Country: West Germany

Agit 883 56 51, later shortened to Agit 883, was an anarchist newspaper in the left-wing West Berlin scene. It ran from February 1969 to February 1972. The number in the title was the telephone number of the editorial office, which was co-editor Dirk Schneider's flat at Uhlandstraße 52 in Berlin-Wilmersdorf. The paper published 86 issues between 1969 and 1973, but was often banned until, in 1971, it went underground.

In June 1970, Agit 883 published the Red Army Faction manifesto in its 62nd issue.
