= Gabriele Dietze =

German culturologist, educator and author (born 1951)

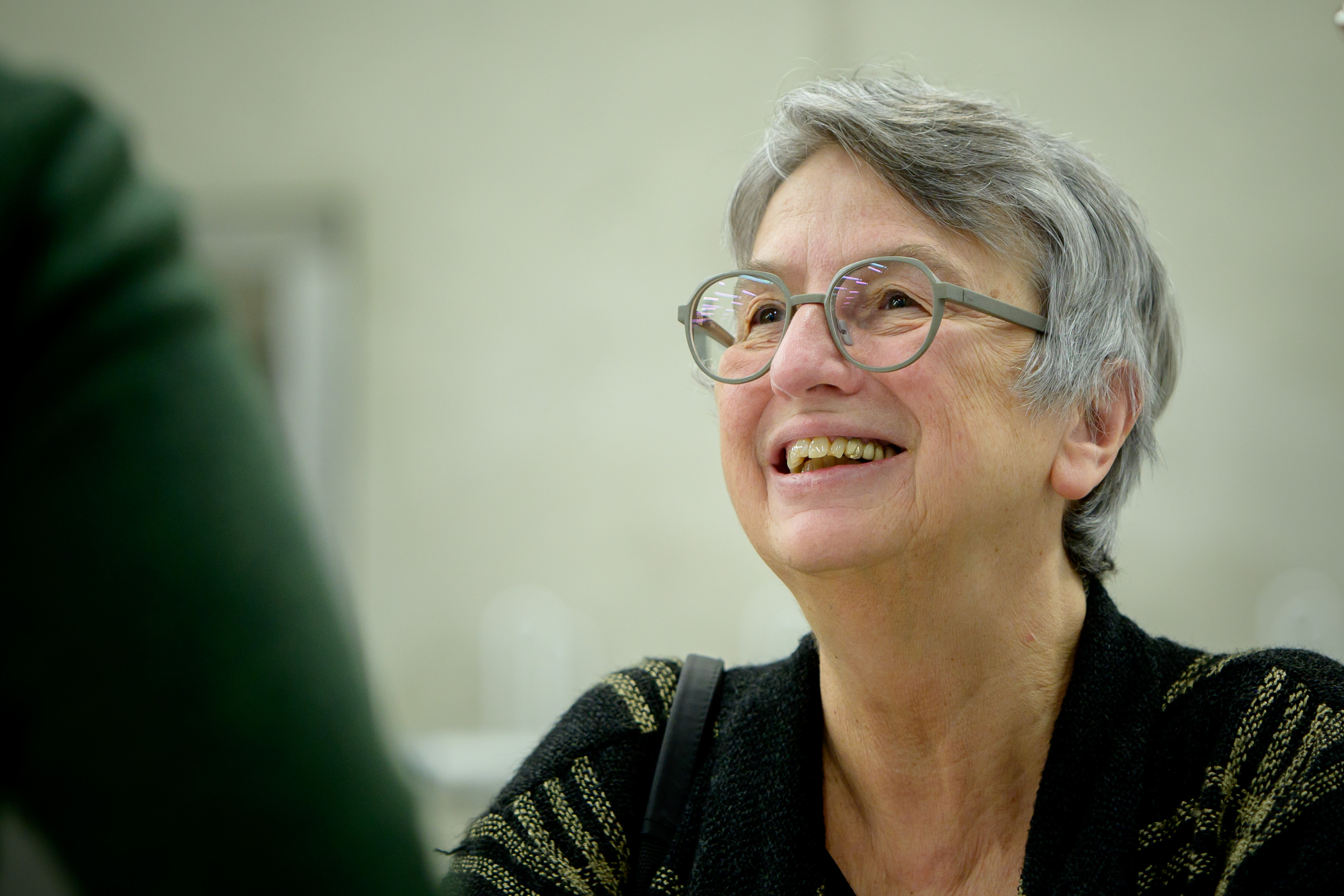
Dietze in 2020

Gabriele Dietze (born 1951 in Wiesbaden) is a German culturologist, university teacher, gender-theorist, essayist and author.

== Life and work ==
Gabriele Dietze studied philosophy, German studies and sociology at the Johann Wolfgang Goethe University in Frankfurt am Main. In 1977, she received her M.A. in German Literature.

In 1979, she published Die Überwindung der Sprachlosigkeit (Finding Their Voices), the first German anthology of theoretical writings from the new women's movement. From 1980 to 1991, she worked as chief editor at Rotbuch Verlag in Berlin. From 1987 to 2001, she was editor of the Rotbuch crime series and worked as a freelance author, essayist and literary critic.

In 1996, she earned her Promotion as a Dr. phil. with her doctoral thesis Genre and Gender. Gender Relations in the American Private detective novel in American Studies with a focus on Cultural Studies at the John F. Kennedy Institute for North American Studies at the FU Berlin. In 2003, she taught American Studies at the Humboldt University of Berlin and qualified as full professor with her post-doctoral thesis (Habilitation), "Negotiating Justice. On the competition between emancipatory race and gender discourses from Uncle Tom's Cabin to the O. J. Simpson trial".

She worked at various universities as a research assistant, private lecturer and visiting professor, among others at Columbia University in New York City, as Max-Kade Professor of German at the University of Virginia, as a multiple Harris Visiting Professor at Dartmouth College and as a Bosch visiting professor at the University of Chicago, the University of Basel and at the Institute for Cultural Studies at the Humboldt University in Berlin. She has participated in numerous academic research projects.

Her research interests include German and American literature and culture as well as issues of gender, critical race studies and right-wing populism. She published numerous books and essays.

For her concepts of ethnosexism and sexual exceptionalism, Gabriele Dietze has been criticized for arguing antifeminist and homophobic.

== Publications ==
- Sexueller Exzeptionalismus. Überlegenheitsnarrative in Migrationsabwehr und Rechtspopulismus. transcript, Bielefeld 2019, ISBN 978-3-8376-4708-2.
- Ethnosexismus. Sex-Mob-Narrative um die Kölner Sylvesternacht. In: movements. Journal for Critical Migration and Border Regime Studies 2 (1), 2016.
- Weiße Frauen in Bewegung. Genealogien und Konkurrenzen von Race- und Genderpolitiken. Transcript, Bielefeld 2013, ISBN 3-89942-517-0.
- Kritik des Okzidentalismus. Transdisziplinäre Beiträge zu (Neo-)Orientalismus und Geschlecht. Hrsg. von Claudia Brunner, G. D., Edith Wenzel. Transcript, Bielefeld 2009, ISBN 978-3-8376-1124-3 (2. Auflage 2010).
- Gender als interdependente Kategorie. Neue Perspektiven auf Intersektionalität, Diversität und Heterogenität. G. D. in Ko-Autorschaft mit Katharina Walgenbach, Antje Hornscheidt und Kerstin Palm. Budrich, Opladen, Berlin, Toronto 2007 (2., durchgesehene Auflage, ISBN 978-3-86649-496-1).
- Gender Kontrovers. Grenzen einer Kategorie. Festschrift für Renate Hof. Hrsg. von G. D, Sabine Hark. Ulrike Helmer, München 2006, ISBN 978-3-89741-215-6.
- „Holy war" and Gender. Violence in religious discourses / „Gotteskrieg" und Geschlecht. Gewaltdiskurse in der Religion. Hrsg. von Christina von Braun, Ulrike Brunotte, G. D., Daniela Hrzàn, Gabriele Jähnert, Dagmar Pruin. Lit, Berlin 2006, ISBN 3-8258-8109-1.
- Weiß – Weißsein – whiteness. Kritische Studien zu Gender und Rassismus. Hrsg. von Martina Tissberger, G. D., Jana Husmann-Kastein, Daniela Hrzán. Lang, Frankfurt am Main u. a. 2006 (2., durchgesehene Auflage 2009, ISBN 978-3-631-57982-4).
- Multiple Persönlichkeit. Krankheit. Medium oder Metapher. Hrsg. und eingeleitet von Christina von Braun, G. D. Neue Kritik, Frankfurt 1999, ISBN 3-8015-0326-7.
- Hardboiled woman. Geschlechterkrieg im amerikanischen Kriminalroman. Europäische Verlagsanstalt, Hamburg 1997, ISBN 3-434-50411-7.
- Todeszeichen. Freitod in Selbstzeugnissen. Gesammelt und eingeleitet von G. D. Luchterhand, Darmstadt 1981 (überarbeitete Neuauflage 1989, ISBN 3-472-61329-7).
- Die Überwindung der Sprachlosigkeit. Texte aus der neuen Frauenbewegung. Eingeleitet und herausgegeben von G. D. Luchterhand, Darmstadt 1979 (= Sammlung Luchterhand. Bd. 276), ISBN 3-472-61276-2 (2. Aufl. 1981, 3. Aufl. 1989).
