= Rudi Dutschke =

German student activist (1940–1979)

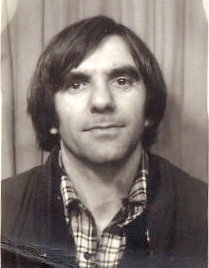
- Born: Alfred Willi Rudolf Dutschke; 7 March 1940; Schönefeld, Nazi Germany
- Died: 24 December 1979 (aged 39); Århus, Denmark
- Education: Freie Universität Berlin
- Known for: Leading figure of the Außerparlamentarische Opposition; Catalyst for the West German student movement
- Spouse: Gretchen Klotz (m. 1966)
- Children: 3

Alfred Willi Rudolf Dutschke (German: [ˈʁuːdi ˈdʊtʃkə]; 7 March 1940 – 24 December 1979) was a German sociologist and political activist who, until severely injured by an assassin in 1968, was a leading charismatic figure within both the Sozialistischer Deutscher Studentenbund (Socialist Students Union) in West Germany and that country's broader Außerparlamentarische Opposition ("extra-parliamentary opposition").

Dutschke claimed both Christian and Marxist inspiration for a socialism that rejected both the Leninist model of party dictatorship that he had experienced as a youth in Communist East Germany, and the compromises of West German social democracy. He advocated the creation of alternative or parallel social, economic and political institutions structured on the principles of direct democracy. At the same time, he joined Moscow- and Beijing-oriented communists in hailing Third World national liberation struggles as fronts in a socialist world revolution.

Controversially for many of those who had protested with him in the 1960s, Dutschke in the 1970s styled himself a patriotic socialist ("Pro Patria Sozi"), and called on the left to re-engage the "national question" and seek a bloc-free path to German reunification.

Shortly before his death in 1979 from complications arising from his injuries in 1968, Dutschke was elected as a delegate to the founding congress of the environmentalist and social-justice Greens. It was a project then understood as the creation of an "anti-party party", engaging with parliamentary politics but remaining a grass-roots movement.

== Christian youth in East Germany ==
Dutschke was born in Schönefeld (an Ortsteil of present-day Nuthe-Urstromtal) near Luckenwalde, Brandenburg, the fourth son of a postal clerk. He was raised and educated in Communist East Germany (the Deutsche Demokratische Republik - DDR, or German Democratic Republic — GDR), obtaining his high-school diploma (Gymnasium Abitur) in 1958, and apprenticed as an industrial salesman.

He joined the regime-directed Free German Youth in 1956, aiming at a sporting career as a decathlete. However, he also engaged in the barely tolerated youth organisation of the East German Protestant Church. Dutschke allowed that religion played an "important role" in his life: that he "incorporated" its "fantastical explanation of the nature of man and his possibilities" into his later political work.

For me, the decisive question, from a real historical point of view, was always: What was Jesus actually doing there? How did he want to change his society and what means did he use? That has always been the crucial question for me. For me, the question of transcendence is also a question of real history, how is the existing society to be transcended, a new design for a future society, that is perhaps materialistic transcendence.

In Easter 1963, he wrote:

Jesus is risen. The decisive revolution in world history has happened – a revolution of all-conquering love. If people would fully receive this revealed love into their own existence, into the reality of the 'now', then the logic of insanity could no longer continue.

It was in this religious milieu outside of approved party and state structures, that Dutschke developed the courage (at the cost of any prospect of further education) to refuse compulsory service in the National People's Army and to encourage others to likewise resist conscription. Dutschke also cited the impact of the Hungarian Uprising of 1956. Its mobilisation in workers' councils suggested to him a democratic socialism beyond the official line of the GDR's governing Socialist Unity Party (but consistent with his reading of the Polish and German revolutionary and theorist, Rosa Luxemburg).

Refused his chosen course of study in sports journalism, in October 1960 Dutschke began regularly crossing into West Berlin to attend the Askanische Oberschule school in Berlin-Tempelhof. With his new Abitur, he secured a job (working for nine months) with the Axel Springer tabloid, Bild Zeitung.

On 10 August 1961, just three days before the restrictions of Barbed Wire Sunday were introduced to close passage from East Berlin to the West, Dutschke registered as a refugee at the Marienfelde transit camp. On 14 August, Dutschke and some friends used a rope to try to tear down a section of the newly-laid barbed wire that was eventually to become the Berlin Wall, and threw leaflets over it into East Berlin. It was his first political action.

== Student political activist, 1960s ==
=== The Free University and Subversive Action ===
Dutschke enrolled at the Free University in West Berlin. Formed in 1948 by students abandoning the Communist Party-controlled Humboldt University in East Berlin, the constitution of the new school incorporated a degree of student representation unknown elsewhere in Germany. But the "democratic" faculty and city officials appeared to Dutschke and his classmates to have broken faith with the model of student co-determination. At senate meetings they confronted student delegates with common positions decided in advance.

Dutschke's scepticism with regard to the democratic credentials of the new institutions in the West were reinforced by his study of sociology, ethnology, philosophy and history under Richard Löwenthal and Klaus Meschkat. He was introduced to the existentialist theories of Martin Heidegger, Karl Jaspers and Jean-Paul Sartre, to György Lukács's theories of reification and class consciousness, and to the critical sociology of the Frankfurt School. Together these sources provided links with the pre-Hitler-and-pre-Stalin Left and encouraged alternative, libertarian interpretations of Marx and of labour history. While increasingly engaged in consciously Marxist polemics, bolstered by his reading of the socialist theologians Karl Barth and Paul Tillich, Dutschke retained an emphasis on individual conscience and freedom of action.

Dutschke believed he had found the means of transforming these critical perspectives into "praxis" in the dissonant, consciousness-raising provocations of the Situationists (in the propositions of Guy Debord, Rauul Vaneigem, Ivan Chtcheglov and others). In 1963 Dutschke joined the group Subversive Action (Subversive Aktion), conceived as the German branch of the Situationist International. He co-edited their paper Anschlag, to which he contributed articles on the revolutionary potential of developments in the Third World.

In December 1964, Dutschke's group joined a demonstration against the state visit of the Congolese Prime Minister Moïse Tshombe. Dutschke spontaneously led the protesters toward Schöneberg Town Hall, seat of the West Berlin House of Representatives, where Tshombe is said to have been hit “full in the face” with tomatoes. Dutschke described this action as the “beginning of our cultural revolution”.

=== SDS, the strategy of confrontation ===
In 1964, Dutschke's group entered the Sozialistischer Deutscher Studentenbund (German Socialist Students Union), the former collegiate wing of the Social Democrats (SPD). The SDS had been expelled from the moderate SPD for its 'unreconstructed leftism', although this had amounted to little more than organising lectures on Marxism.

Dutschke, elected in 1965 to the political council of the West Berlin SDS in the face of some considerable resistance, argued for confrontations in the university and on the streets. The theory as expounded by Dutschke in relation to protests against the Vietnam War, which soon dominated the agenda, was that "systematic, limited and controlled confrontations with the power structure" would "force the representative 'democracy' to show openly its class character, its authoritarianism, ... to expose itself as a 'dictatorship of force'". The awareness produced by such provocations would free people to rethink democratic theory and practice.

Dutschke and his faction had an important ally in Michael Vester, SDS vice-president and international secretary. Vester, who had studied in the US in 1961–62, and worked extensively with the American SDS (Students for a Democratic Society), introduced the theories of the American New Left and supported the call for “direct action” and civil disobedience.

In April 1965 Dutschke traveled with an SDS group to the Soviet Union. His hosts, who would have been aware of his critical, in their view anti-Soviet, commentary in Anschlag, classified him as a Trotskyite. On his return in May 1965, his group's target was the United States, driven in particular by outrage over its invasion of the Dominican Republic.

In the summer of 1965 Dutschke took part in student protests over the Free University's refusal of speaking rights to the writer Erich Kuby. This was a prelude to a sit-in at the university in June the following year. Just as in the Berkeley Free Speech Movement two years earlier, West Berlin students were making a connection between the imperiousness of the university authorities and the broader absence of democratic practice.

=== Marriage to Gretchen Klotz and rejection of free-love commune ===
On 23 March 1966, Dutschke privately married the American theology student Gretchen Klotz. She credits herself with making her husband aware of the misogyny in their revolutionary ranks: “What shocked me was, when the women talked in meetings, the men laughed. I said to Rudi ‘this is impossible’ but I don't think he was aware of it up to that point, he couldn't see it before then".

The couple declined invitations to join a newly founded residential Kommune in West Berlin, suggesting that in opposing permanent couple relationships the group were merely substituting a “bourgeois principle of exchange under pseudo-revolutionary auspices”. They had three children together.

Shortly after the birth of their first child, a son they named Hosea-Che, Dutschke and Klotz were forced to leave their apartment after the appearance of threatening graffiti (“Gas Dutschke!”) and attacks using smoke bombs and excrement. The CSU member of the Bundestag, Franz Xaver Unertl, described Dutschke as an "unwashed, lousy and filthy creature".

=== Revolutionary "voluntarist" ===
On 2 June 1967, SDS member Benno Ohnesorg was shot and killed by a policeman in West Berlin. Heeding Ulrike Meinhof's call in the journal konkret, he had been among students protesting a visit by the Shah of Iran. Writing in konkret (since revealed to have been subsidised by the East German government) Sebastian Haffner argued that "with the student pogrom of 2 June 1967 fascism in West Berlin had thrown off its mask". Outrage was directed not only at the city authorities. Dutschke called for the expropriation of his (and Haffner's) former employer, the conservative Axel Springer Press, which at that time controlled about two thirds of the leading media in West Berlin. Along with many on the left, he accused the Springer press of incitement (the response of Springer's Bild Zeitung to Ohnesorg’s shooting was “Students threaten, We shoot back”). A general wave of student protest shook the universities and major cities. Springer offices were attacked and print and distribution operations disrupted.

At a hastily convened university congress in Hanover, the sociologist and philosopher Jürgen Habermas charged Dutschke with a “voluntarism” akin "to leftist fascism". He argued that Dutschke's notion of calculated disturbance to unmask the veiled force of the state was mistaken. There was not a revolutionary situation in Germany. Dutschke, he said, was putting the lives of other students at risk.

Dutschke responded that he was honoured by the accusation of voluntarism; Habermas's “objectivity” served only to hold back a rising movement. In his diary Dutschke cited Che Guevara: “Revolutionaries must not just wait for the objective conditions for a revolution. By creating a popular ‘armed focus’ they can create the objective conditions for a revolution by subjective initiative". After Guevara's death as a guerrilla in Bolivia in October 1967, Dutschke and the Chilean Gaston Salvatore translated and wrote an introduction to the Argentinian's last public statement, Message to the Tricontinental, with its famous appeal for "two, three, many Vietnams".

Within a month, Dutschke recognized that the campaign against Springer, from which both trade unions and the liberal press distanced themselves, could not "mobilise the masses" and called for a halt. Vietnam, and German complicity in the escalating American war, was to be the new focus.

=== Vietnam mobilisation ===
In 1966, Dutschke and the SDS had staged the "Vietnam – Analysis of an Example" congress at the University of Frankfurt, with Herbert Marcuse as the main speaker and around 2,200 students and trade unionists attending. Following the example of the Amsterdam Provo movement they began "walking demonstrations" against the Vietnam War on Kurfürstendamm in West Berlin. These were broken up by riot police and along with 84 others, the Dutschkes were arrested. It was at this point in December 1966 that the press began to refer Dutschke as the "spokesman for the SDS".

On 21 October 1967 Dutschke joined about 10,000 people on the streets of West Berlin, while 250,000 anti-war protesters besieged the Pentagon in Washington. On Christmas Eve, he led SDS members to the Kaiser Wilhelm Memorial Church with banners displaying the picture of a tortured Vietnamese and Jesus's words "Verily I say unto you, Inasmuch as ye have done it unto one of the least of these my brethren, ye have done it unto me" (Matthew 25.40). Dutschke was prevented from speaking from the pulpit by a bloody blow to the head.

At the beginning of 1968, the SDS decided to organise an international conference in West Berlin, a site chosen as the "intersection" of the rival Cold War blocs and as a "provocation" to the city's American military presence. After the Free University refused to host the conference, and despite a concerted campaign in the Springer press and opposition in the Berlin Senate, the Technische Universität Berlin agreed to host the two-day event.

Forty-four socialist-youth delegations from fourteen countries (including the FDJ from East Germany) attended. In addition to Dutschke, who appeared to direct much of the discussion, they were addressed by Alain Krivine and Daniel Bensaïd (both Jeunesse Communiste Révolutionnaire, JCR) as well as Daniel Cohn-Bendit (Liaison d'Étudiants Anarchistes) from France, Tariq Ali and Robin Blackburn (New Left Review and Vietnam Solidarity Campaign) from Great Britain, Bahman Nirumand (of the international Confederation of Iranian Students) and Bernardine Dohrn (Students for a Democratic Society) from the USA. The floor was also given to Dutschke's friend, the veteran Belgian Trotskyist Ernest Mandel. Characterising the national liberation struggle of the Vietnamese people as an active front in a worldwide socialist revolution, the final declaration charged "US imperialism" with "trying to incorporate the Western European metropolises into its policy of colonial counterrevolution via NATO".

Under the slogan "Smash NATO," and encouraging American soldiers stationed in West Berlin to desert en masse, Dutschke wanted to lead the closing demonstration of more than 15,000 people ("above a sea of red flags rose huge portraits of Rosa Luxemburg, Karl Liebknecht, Che Guevara, and Ho Chi Minh") in a march on the U.S. Army McNair Barracks in Berlin-Lichterfelde. But once the U.S. Command cautioned that it would use force to defend the barracks, and following discussions with the novelist Günter Grass, Bishop Kurt Scharf and the former West Berlin mayor Heinrich Albertz, Dutschke was persuaded that this was a provocation from which it would be best to desist. He called on the students to "leave here quietly and spread out in small groups across the city to distribute your pamphlets".

Three days later, on 21 February 1968, at a counter demonstration of some 60,000 West Berliners organized by the Berlin Senate and Springer Press at Schöneberg Town Hall, there were placards identifying Dutschke as "The Enemy of the People [Volkfeind] no. 1". When the crowd mistook a young man for Dutschke, they pushed him to the ground and chased him to a police van, which they then almost toppled over.

=== Rejects vanguardist model ===
From the summer of 1967, Ernest Mandel had been trying persuade Dutschke to transform the Marxist wing of the SDS into a revolutionary socialist youth organisation on the model of the French JCR; to "select the best comrades to create an organisation within the SDS ... to form a cadre ... and to build a vanguard from inside the social-democratic union." Klaus Meschkat, who had founded the rival Republikanischer Club in response to what he saw as the anarchist tendency within the SDS, did not believe this strategy was viable. He advised Mandel that Dutschke was able to maintain his position in the SDS only by virtue of his political flexibility.

In a televised interview with Günter Gaus in October 1967, Dutschke was unequivocal: "We are not a Leninist cadre party, we are a completely decentralised organisation". It was something he claimed was a "great advantage". Because the SDS was "set up in a decentralised manner" it was "in a position to set the movement in motion at any time, that is, people are always ready to participate, we don't need to force them, it is a voluntary matter". They know that there is no "apparatus" giving precedence to the interests of office holders or professional politicians.

At the same time, Dutschke asserted that, while it might be otherwise for the right, "in organised late capitalism" there could be "no victory for left minorities". The SDS remained only a small group. In West Berlin, he suggested it might have "90 very active people and maybe 300, 400 active people", and in the wider movement, four to five thousand people ready to take part in its "awareness-raising events" and campaigns.

=== Revolution as a "march through institutions" ===
"Revolution", Dutschke argued, "is a long complicated process in which people have to change", and such change is effected only by a "long march through the institutions". By this he meant not the pushing aside of Nazi holdovers and conservative careerists in an attempt to promote reform from within existing structures, but instead the creation of new institutions to replace those that are irredeemable in their present state.

These institutions include the existing parliamentary system and its party-political apparatus. Such a system does not represent "the real interests of our people", which Dutschke described to Gaus as "the right to reunification, safeguarding jobs, safeguarding state finances, the reordering of the economy". The problem is that "there is a total separation between the representatives in parliament and the people" and consequently no "critical dialogue". Elections are held every four years, and there is a chance to confirm existing parties, but "less and less" an opportunity to endorse new parties "and thus new alternatives to the existing order". The trade unions he also deemed “absolutely unsuitable for democratization from below".

The place of universities in this schema remained unclear. On the one hand, Dutschke dismissed them as "factories" geared to the production of Fachidioten (people incapable of critical thought beyond their narrowly defined field of training). On the other, he cast them in the role of “safety zones" and "social bases" from which the march of change could be initiated. In 1966, at the SDS delegates' conference, he called for “the organization of the permanent counter-university as a basis for the politicization of universities”. Following the example of similar experiments at the University of California, Berkeley and the Paris Sorbonne, in November 1967 he attempted to promote the "Critical University" through a series of seminars at the FU.

=== The APO and support for the Prague Spring ===
Dutschke did not share the reformist euphoria surrounding Willy Brandt, the former anti-Nazi resister and West Berlin mayor who, as junior partner to the ruling Christian Democrats, led the Social Democrats for the first time into federal government in December 1966. Dutschke joined calls for an extra-parliamentary opposition (Außerparlamentarische Opposition, APO). This loose grouping of disaffected social democrats, militant trade unionists, students and writers believed that, with the formation of the Grand Coalition, the Federal Republic had abandoned any semblance of a democratic counterweight to vested interests. "We have to say no", declared Dutschke, to a parliament in which "we are no longer represented! We have to say no to a grand coalition ... created to maintain the rule of the government clique, the bureaucratic oligarchy".

At the same time, Dutschke was concerned that student protests and the APO not be instrumentalised by Soviet and East German propaganda. In March 1968 the Dutschkes traveled to Czechoslovakia in solidarity with the Prague Spring. In two lectures for the Christian Peace Conference (CFK) (and with citations from Marx's Theses on Feuerbach) he encouraged Czech students to combine socialism and civil rights.

=== The right to German reunification ===
The interview in October 1967 on Gaus's SWR programme Zur Person gave Dutschke the kind of media exposure reserved for the Federal Republic's leading statesmen and intellectuals. It also highlighted a facet of Dutschke thinking that distinguished him from, and disturbed, many of his West German comrades in the SDS. Gaus's first question to Dutschke was why he wished to upend the republic's social order. Dutschke replied first with a classic socialist observation:

[In 1918] the German workers 'and soldiers' councils fought for the eight-hour day. In 1967 our workers worked a measly four or five hours less a week. And that with a tremendous development of the productive forces, the technical achievements, which could really bring about a very, very great reduction in working hours. Instead, in the interests of the ruling order, working-time reduction is resisted so as to maintain the lack of consciousness that the [long] hours induce.

Then, as an illustration of this system-induced lack of political consciousness, Dutschke offered as examples not the mendacity of the mass-circulation Springer Press, the assassination of Ohnesorg, German complicity in the Vietnam war or any other contemporary issues that might have been anticipated from his billing as a generational spokesman, but instead the lack of progress on German re-unification.

For example: after the Second World War, governments talked incessantly of reunification. But in twenty years and more instead of reunification we have had a succession of governments that we can describe as institutional instruments for lying, for half-truths, for distortions. The people are not being told the truth. There is no dialogue with the masses, no critical dialogue that could explain what is going on in this society: why the economic miracle [Wirtschaftswunder] suddenly came to an end; why no progress has been made on the question of reunification?

Dutscke believed that, even after Hitler, Germans had the right to decide for themselves whether to live in a reunified state. Ironically, no prominent West German stood closer to Dutschke on this point than his nemesis Axel Springer. In what he described as the "central political event of my life", in 1958 Springer had gone to Moscow to personally press the case for an "Austrian solution": national unity in return for permanent neutrality. The difference was that German neutrality for Dutschke was a condition not only for national unity but for social transformation.

We criticise the GDR and we have the task of overthrowing capitalist rule in the Federal Republic in order to make a whole Germany possible, which is not identical with the GDR, which really has nothing in common with today's Federal Republic, but a whole Germany, where producers, students, workers and housewives, the different strata of the people, can really represent their interests.

Dutschke confessed himself perplexed as to why the German left did not "think nationally"; the socialist opposition in the GDR and the Federal Republic should work together, recognizing that "the GDR is not the better Germany. But it is part of Germany". The "socialist reunification of Germany" would to undermine the "idiocy of the East-West antagonism" and the hegemony of the superpowers in Central Europe.

In June 1967, Dutschke proposed that West Berlin, then still under Western Allied sovereignty, declare itself a council republic. "West Berlin supported by direct council democracy" could "be a strategic transmission belt for the future reunification of Germany," triggering by its example an intellectual, and ultimately also political, upheaval in both German states.

== Attempted assassination and its aftermath ==
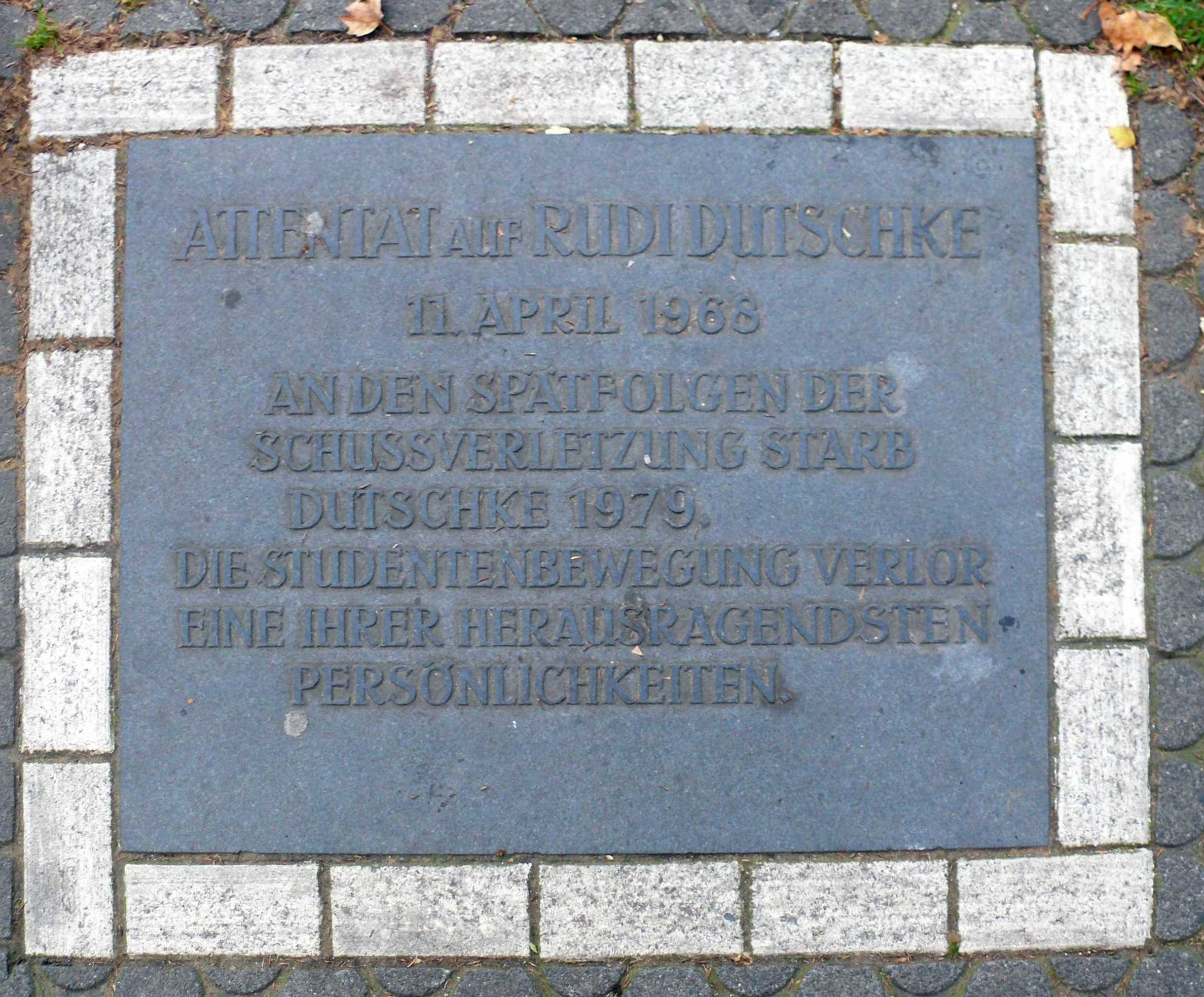
Memorial plate for Rudi Dutschke at Kurfürstendamm and Joachim-Friedrich Straße in Berlin, Germany

=== The shooting and protest reaction ===
On his return from Prague, Dutschke wanted to live with his wife for one to two years in the US and to study Latin American liberation movements. The main reason he gave was that he objected in principle to the role in which he had been cast by the media, as leader of the APO. The APO should not require a leader, and should demonstrate initiative without his presence. He had prepared the move and in the interim had accepted an invitation to a 1 May demonstration in Paris when, on 11 April 1968 he was shot.

Josef Bachmann, his assailant, a builder's labourer and petty criminal, had left East Germany as a child. In 1961, aged 17, he made contact with a Neo-Nazi cell in Peine with whom he handled weapons. Bachman testified that the immediate inspiration for his attack was the assassination the week before of Martin Luther King Jr. He had waited for Dutschke outside the SDS office on Kurfürstendamm. When the student leader stepped out of the office to collect a prescription for his newborn son Hosea Che, Bachmann approached him, shouting "you dirty, communist pig", and fired three shots striking him twice in the head and once in the shoulder. Bachmann fled to a nearby basement, where, after a shootout with the police, he was arrested.

The shooting sparked what became known as the Westdeutsche Studentenbewegung ("West German student movement"). Springer once again was accused of complicity ("Bild schoss mit!"). Demonstrators tried to storm the Springer house in Berlin and set fire to Bild delivery vans. The Hamburg print shop was besieged to prevent the paper leaving the presses, and in Munich a demonstrator and a policeman were killed after students ransacked the Bild editorial offices. There were over a thousand arrests.

The Federal Chancellor Kurt Kiesinger cut short his Easter holiday, claiming on his return to Bonn that a planned political action was in progress which had a "revolutionary character". He appealed to all those who felt responsible for the maintenance of democracy to show vigilance and calm.

Borrowing the American SDS slogan "From Protest to Resistance", in konkret Ulrike Meinhof suggested the events marked a new phase in the struggle for socialism, and famously intoned:

Protest is when I say that I don’t like this and that. Resistance is when I make sure that the things I don’t like no longer occur. Protest is when I say I will no longer go along with it. Resistance is when I make sure that no one else goes along with it anymore either.

=== England, Ireland, Denmark ===
Dutschke survived, but the attack left him with aphasia, brain damage, memory loss, epileptic seizures and several other health problems. The Dutschkes began a time of convalescence in Italy, guests of the composer Hans-Werner Henze. Once the press discovered their presence, and after Canada, the Netherlands and Belgium had denied them entry, they left for England. Clare Hall at the University of Cambridge had offered Dutschke the opportunity to complete his doctoral thesis (an analysis of the early Commintern and the differences between Asian and European paths to socialism). For ten days in May 1969 he returned to the Federal Republic to discuss the future of the APO with, among others, Ulrike Meinhof. He seemed to welcome the fact that many left groups wanted to go their own way and, if only on the basis of his health, ruled out a further strategizing role for himself. Back in England, however, the Labour government denied him a student visa. Neal Ascherson arranged for refuge in Ireland.

Between January and March 1969, the Dutschkes were guests, outside Dublin, of Conor Cruise O'Brien, who had been distinguished since his UN service during the Congo Crisis by his criticism of U.S. policy both in Vietnam and at home in the repression of the Black Panthers. During their stay, Rudi and Gretchen Dutschke were visited by their lawyer Horst Mahler, who tried, unsuccessfully, to persuade them to support his underground activity in the group that was to become the Red Army Faction (the "Baader Meinhof Gang").

As the student movement back home splintered and radicalized, the Dutschkes considered staying in Ireland, but returned to the UK in mid-March 1969, proposing as a condition that Rudi avoid engaging in political activity. At the beginning of 1971 it was an undertaking the UK Home Office believed he had breached, ruling that his meetings with visitors from Germany, Israel, Jordan, Chile and the United States had "far exceeded normal social activities". In a House of Commons debate on the question of his exclusion, which Labour—now in opposition—protested, Dutschke was described from governing Conservative benches as "a disciple of Professor Marcuse, who is the patron saint of the urban guerrillas and who is out to destroy the society we hold dear". The University of Aarhus offered him a position teaching sociology and the Dutschkes moved to Denmark.

== Re-engagement in the 1970s ==
=== Solidarity with East Bloc dissidents ===
Dutschke visited the Federal Republic again in May 1972. He sought talks with trade unionists and social democrats, including former president Gustav Heinemann, whose vision of a non-aligned, demilitarized Germany as a whole he shared. In July 1972 he visited East Berlin several times, meeting Wolf Biermann, with whom he remained friends. He later made contact with Robert Havemann and Rudolf Bahro and East-Bloc dissidents such as Milan Horáček and Adam Michnik, among others.

In 1973 he finally received his doctorate from the Free University of Berlin. At the Free University he participated in a research project by the German Research Foundation comparing the labor-market regimes of the Federal Republic, the GDR and the USSR.

Increasingly, Dutschke was associated with concerns for civil and political rights. Having renewed contact with East Bloc dissidents, in West Germany and abroad (in Norway and in Italy), he critically reviewed the rights record of Warsaw Pact states as well as of the Federal Republic where he made an issue of the bans (Berufsverbot) on the professional employment of those deemed radical (anti-constitutional) leftists. After Rudolf Bahro was sentenced to eight years in prison in the GDR, Dutschke organized and led the Bahro Solidarity Congress in West Berlin in November 1978.

In October 1979, sensing that Federal Chancellor Helmut Schmidt was impatient with questioning at a press conference with Chairman of the Chinese Communist Party Hua Guofeng, Dutschke, representing the left-wing daily taz, reminded the Chancellor that he was in presence of a free press, not the hierarchical Bundeswehr nor the totalitarian regimes of Beijing, Moscow or East Berlin. Having breached decorum, he was then unable to pose his intended question: why had the chancellor failed to raise with his guest the issue of human rights in China?

=== On political violence ===
While Dutschke was touring West Germany in 1972, the Red Army Faction launched their "May offensive", a series of bombings directed at the police and judiciary, the U.S. army presence and the Springer press, which together killed 4 people and injured 41. In November 1974, Holger Meins, one of the three RAF members detained and convicted in the wake of these attacks, died on hunger strike. Dutschke created a political furore when, at the graveside, he declared "Holger, the struggle continues!"

The direct actions and provocations that Dutschke defended as a means of "unmasking the authoritarian structures" of capitalist society, did not in principle exclude armed violence. In July 1967, in discussions following a lecture by Marcuse on "The End of Utopia", Dutschke dismissed "pacifism on principle" as counterrevolutionary. Insisting on the need to think in terms of a global system, he argued for "full identification with the necessity of revolutionary terrorism and revolutionary struggle in the Third World" and recognition that this solidarity was indispensable to "the development of forms of resistance in our country". At the SDS delegate conference in Frankfurt in September 1967, Dutschke proposed the creation of urban "sabotage and refusnik guerrilla" (Sabotage und Verweigerungsguerilla) groups.

Although Dutschke had assured Gaus that "we fight so that it need never come to the point of having to reach for arms," Gretchen Dutschke concedes they had considered the possibility of taking direct violent action. Early in 1968 the young parents had transported explosives (provided by the Milan publisher Giangiacomo Feltrinelli) through Berlin in a pram under their newborn son. To express their solidarity with the Vietnamese, Dutschke and his friends were considering using the explosives to carry out attacks on ships carrying war materiel, railroad tracks or overhead lines. But recognizing the risk of injury to people, they thought better of it, and had the dynamite quietly dropped into the sea.

As the RAF, who showed no such scruples, continued their attacks, the Dutschkes argued that they "would destroy the achievements the '68 movement had fought for." Dutschke sought to distance himself from the activities of the RAF by noting that when he had considered violence it had been directed at things, not people. In an interview, shortly before he was shot, Dutschke acknowledged only "one terror – that is the terror against inhuman machineries. To blow up Springer's printing machinery without destroying people, that seems to me to be an emancipating act".

In December 1978, reflecting on the turmoil of the preceding decade, Dutschke was more emphatic:

Individual terror is anti-mass and anti-humanist. Every small citizens' initiative, every political and social youth, women, unemployed, pensioner and class struggle movement is a hundred times more valuable and qualitatively different than the most spectacular action of individual terror.

=== "Pro Patria Socialist" ===
In the 1970s, Dutschke contended with charges of guilt by intellectual association not only with terrorism on the left but also with nationalism on the right. He returned, it seemed increasingly, to the theme of German re-unification.

In November 1974, in Meinhof's former magazine konkret, under the title “Pro Patria Sozi?” Dutschke proposed that "the struggle for national independence is ... becoming an elementary point of the socialist struggle". In a paper prepared for a meeting to create an organisational basis for the “New Left” in Hanover in 1975, Dutschke wrote: “In the context of a German socialist transition program, the social question cannot be separated from the national question – and this Dialectic has not stopped at the Elbe.” It was time, he argued, to recognize that the attempt by the “great powers” to pacify Central Europe by dividing Germany had failed. It was leading instead to "ever increasing militarization".

In the autumn of 1976 in an interview with a Stuttgart school newspaper, Dutschke suggested that in other countries the left had a distinct advantage: they could invoke “a national identity”, not of the bourgeoisie, but "of the people and the class in relation to the social movement." If the question of socialism was to be posed in Germany, it was essential that we overcome the country's "special loss of identity" ("Identitätsverlust") after World War II, so that we too could "look outwards ... both feet on our ground". "The class struggle", he insisted, "is international, but its form is national".

On the West German left there was very little understanding of such "national thinking". Arno Klönne, peace campaigner and early guiding spirit of the APO, responded to Dutschke's "thesis on the national question" with an article entitled: “Be careful, national socialists!”.

=== Green ===
From 1976 Dutschke was a member of the "Socialist Bureau", created after the final dissolution of the SDS. He was an advocate for a new "eco-socialist" constellation that would embrace activists in the anti-nuclear, anti-war, feminist and environmentalist movements but, in contrast to the APO of the sixties, would necessarily exclude Leninists (the communists, the "K-gruppen") and others not in sympathy to the spirit and practice of citizen initiatives (Bürgerinitiativen) and of grass-roots democracy. Dutschke established his credentials with the new generation of activists by participating in the attempted occupation of a nuclear power construction site, just over the border from Denmark, at Brokdorf, Schleswig-Hollstein.

From 1978 he campaigned with others for a green alternative list that should take part in the upcoming European elections. In June 1979 Joseph Beuys persuaded him to make joint campaign appearances. His appearance in Bremen, just three days before polling in the city-state elections, was credited with pushing the Green List over the five percent parliamentary threshold.

The first green-alternative alliance, and the first new left political force, to be represented in a German parliament, the Bremen Greens elected Dutschke as a delegate for the founding congress for a federal Green Party planned for mid-January 1980. The Greens then were promising an "anti-party party"; a party which, true to their origins in environmentalist, feminist, and anti-war/anti-nuclear protest would remain a grass-roots democratic (basisdemokratische) movement.

In his last major appearance at pre-congress of the Greens in Offenbach am Main, Dutschke again raised the “German Question”. He advocated the right of nations to self-determination and thus a right of resistance to the military blocs in West and East. Nobody else raised this issue because it contradicted the majority position of strict nonviolence and pacifism.

== Death and tributes ==
Dutschke had continued to struggle with health problems due to brain injuries sustained in the assassination attempt against him. On 24 December 1979, he had an epileptic seizure in the bathtub and drowned, dying at age 39. Dutschke was survived by his American wife Gretchen Dutschke-Klotz whom he had married in 1966, and by their two children Hosea Che Dutschke (named after the Old Testament minor prophet Hosea and Che Guevara), and sister Polly Nicole Dutschke, both born in 1968. They had a third child, Rudi-Marek Dutschke (named after a Bulgarian Communist), born in 1980 after his father's death.

In what was reported as a symbolic laying to rest of their "hopes of the 1960s for social change", thousands attended Dutschke's funeral service at St Anne's Parish Church (St. Annen Dorfkirche) in Dahlem, Berlin. The service was conducted by Rev. Helmut Gollwitzer, a Protestant theologian renowned as a member, under the Nazis, of the dissident Confessing Church movement. Gollwitzer praised Dutschke as a man who had "fought passionately, but not fanatically, for a more humane world", and had sought "a unity of socialism and Christianity". In a party statement, West Berlin's governing Social Democrats described Dutschke's early death as "the terrible price he had to pay for his attempts to change a society whose politicians and news media showed a lack of understanding, maturity, and tolerance".

In 2018, it emerged that Rudolf Augstein, publisher of Der Spiegel, provided financial support to Dutschke so he could continue to work on his dissertations. Between 1970 and 1973, he paid 1,000 German Marks per year. At the same time they started an exchange of letters in which they also discussed the student revolts.

== Memorials ==
There is a memorial stone (Gedenktafel) laid in pavement in front of Kurfürstendamm 141, Berlin, marking the spot where Dutschke was shot in 1969. It reads (translated from the German): "Attack on Rudi Dutschke, April 11, 1968. As a late complication of the wound he received, Dutschke died in 1979. The student movement lost one of their most outstanding personalities".

In Berlin-Kreuzberg there is a Rudi-Dutschke-Straße. As a continuation of Oranienstrasse, the street leads from Lindenstrasse/Axel-Springer-Strasse to Friedrichstrasse, where it merges into Kochstrasse. Rudi-Dutschke-Strasse was created after years of political and legal disputes by renaming the eastern section of Kochstrasse. The renaming, which was suggested by the national daily newspaper Die Tageszeitung (taz), was completed on 30 April 2008 with the unveiling of a street sign on the corner of Rudi-Dutschke-/Axel-Springer-Straße in front of the Axel Springer high-rise. Acknowledging the controversy, Die Tageszeitung published the objections of the former CDU parliamentarian Gerd Langguth, author of Mythos ’68 – Die Gewaltphilosophie von Rudi Dutschke (The Myth of '68: The Violent Philosophy of Rudi Dutschke) (2001). "Only those who can prove that Dutschke was an irreproachable democrat", Langguth argued, "should advocate renaming a traditional Berlin street after a historically highly controversial figure".

In 2008, the square in front of the former railway station at Schönefeld, the Ortsteil where Dutschke’s was born, was renamed Rudi-Dutschke-Platz.

== Legacy ==
In her 2018 memoir, 1968: Worauf wir stolz sein dürfen (“What we can be proud of”), Gretchen Dutschke-Klotz argues that her husband helped advance an anti-authoritarian revolution in the German Federal Republic, and that this served in turn to protect the republic against the right-wing extremism and nationalist populism that had infected many of its neighbors. She believes that Germany has "held out pretty well so far against the extreme right-wing, and that has to do with the democratization process and culture revolution which the 68ers [Rudi Dutschke among them] carried out. It’s still having an effect.”

Others have taken a different view. The Bavarian Information Center against Extremism (BIGE) notes that some of Dutschke's remarks on the German question have been cited by right-wing extremists. On the 40th anniversary of his death, the neo-Nazi grouping The Third Way (III. Weg) claimed that if he were alive Dutschke would be one of them ("Rudi Dutschke wäre heute einer von uns!“). As evidence for this thesis, reference is made to the biographies of some of his former comrades: Horst Mahler, whose solicitation on behalf of the nascent RAF the Dutschkes rejected in Dublin, had been in a right-wing Studentenverbindung before joining Dutschke in the SDS and, after serving ten years in prison for his RAF activity has twice been imprisoned for Holocaust denial. Perhaps more significant is the case of Bernd Rabehl, who, in a biography of his former comrade, has sought to justify his own turn to right-wing extremism by characterising Dutschke's position as "national revolutionary"

Johannes Agnoli, who spoke alongside Dutschke at the Vietnam Congress, denies any such "national revolutionary departure" in their frequent debates. Accounting him an opponent within the SDS, Dutschke had not worked with Rabehl politically since 1966, and subsequently dismissed him as a cynical opportunist. Gretchen Dutschke-Klotz insists that:

Rudi wanted to abolish subservience as a personality trait of German identity. [...] He was not a 'national revolutionary' but an internationalist socialist who, unlike others, had understood that it was politically wrong to ignore the national question. [...] He was looking for something completely new that did not follow the authoritarian, national-chauvinist German past.

Those, like Ralf Dahrendorf, satisfied that Dutschke was "a decent, honest and trustworthy man," can nonetheless take a dismissive view of his contributions. Reviewing Dutschke's theories and social science research, Dahrendorf found him "muddle-headed" and with no lasting legacy: "I don't know anyone who would say: that was Dutschke's idea, we have to pursue it now."

== Works ==
- Dutschke, Rudi (1980), Mein langer Marsch: Reden, Schriften und Tagebücher aus zwanzig Jahren (in German), Hamburg, DE: Rowohlt.
- Dutschke, Rudi (2003), Dutschke, Gretchen (ed.), Jeder hat sein Leben ganz zu leben (diaries) (in German), Köln, DE: Kiepenheuer & Witsch, ISBN 3-462-03224-0 (1963–1979).
- Dutschke, Rudi (Summer 1982), "It Is Not Easy to Walk Upright", Telos, 1982 (52), New York: Telos Press: 171–177, doi:10.3817/0682052171, S2CID 147179235.

== See also ==
- Kommune 1
- Sozialistischer Deutscher Studentenbund

== Bibliography ==
- Baer, Willi, Karl-Heinz Dellwo (2012), Rudi Dutschke – Aufrecht Gehen. 1968 und der libertäre Kommunismus [Rudi Dutschke - Walking upright. 1968 and libertarian communism]. Laika, Hamburg, ISBN 978-3-942281-81-2.
- Chaussy, Ulrich (2018). Rudi Dutschke. Die Biographie. Droemer eBook. ISBN 978-3-426-45141-0.
- Dutschke, Gretchen (1996), Wir hatten ein barbarisches, schönes Leben [We had a Barbaric, Beautiful Life] (biography) (in German), Köln, DE: Kiepenheuer & Witsch, ISBN 3-462-02573-2.
- Dutschke, Gretchen (2018). 1968: Worauf wir stolz sein dürfen [1968: What we can be proud of]. Hamburg: Kursbuch Kulturstiftung, ISBN 978-3-96196-006-4.
- Dutschke, Rudi-Marek (2001): Spuren meines Vaters [Traces of my Father]. und Witsch, Köln, ISBN 3-462-03038-8.
- Ditfurth, Jutta (2008): Rudi und Ulrike: Geschichte einer Freundschaft [Rudi and Ulrike: Story of a Friendship]. Droemer Knaur, München, ISBN 3-426-27456-6.
- Fichter, Tilman, Siegward Lönnendonker (2011), Dutschkes Deutschland. Der Sozialistische Deutsche Studentenbund, die nationale Frage und die DDR-Kritik von links [Dutschke’s Germany: The Sozialistischer Deutscher Studentenbund, the National Question and the East German (lit. 'DDR') Critics from the left]. Klartext, Essen, ISBN 978-3-8375-0481-1.
- Karl, Michaela (2003), Rudi Dutschke – Revolutionär ohne Revolution [Rudi Dutschke - Revolutionary Without Revolution]. Neue Kritik, Frankfurt am Main, ISBN 3-8015-0364-X.
- Prien, Carsten (2015), Dutschkismus – die politische Theorie Rudi Dutschkes [Dutschkism - the Political Theories of Rudi Dutschke]. Ousia Lesekreis Verlag, Seedorf, ISBN 978-3-944570-58-7.
