= Gretchen Dutschke-Klotz =

German-American author

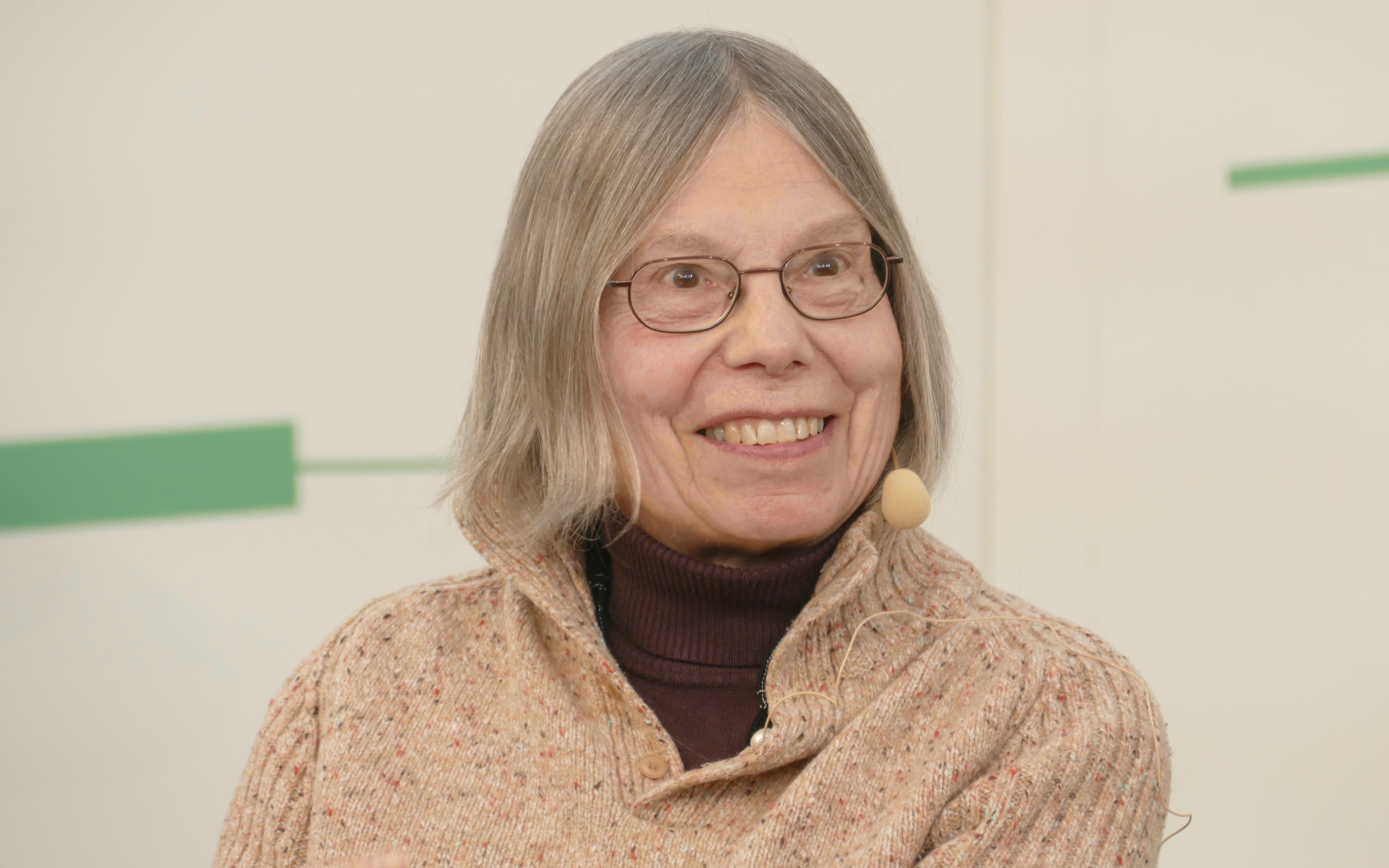
Gretchen Dutschke-Klotz, 2018

Gretchen Dutschke-Klotz (born Gretchen Klotz; March 3, 1942) is a German-American author and former activist. In West Berlin and West Germany in 1960s she was active with her husband Rudi Dutschke in the Socialist Students Union (SDS) and the Federal Republic's broader "extra-parliamentary opposition" (APO).

== Life ==
Gretchen Klotz was born in conservative, suburban Oak Park, Illinois. She majored in philosophy at Wheaton College, where she first participated in student demonstrations. During a semester studying German at the Goethe Institute, Munich, she met Dutschke, a charismatic figure among radical students in West Berlin. In March 1965 she moved to Germany and married him while taking up studies at Free University of Berlin.

Following an assassination attempt on her husband in April 1968, she and the first of their three children moved with him to Cambridge, England, and then Aarhus, Denmark. Six years after Rudi Dutschke's death in 1979 from complications arising from his injuries in 1968, she moved back to the United States, returning to Berlin in 2009.

She has published memoirs and reflections on her and Rudi Dutschke's experiences of the "anti-authoritarian" 1960s student movement, which she believes "changed Germany".

== Works ==
- Rudi Dutschke. Wir hatten ein barbarisches, schönes Leben. Eine Biographie. Kiepenheuer und Witsch, Köln 1996, ISBN 978-3-462-02573-6.
- (ed.) Rudi Dutschke: Jeder hat sein Leben ganz zu leben. Die Tagebücher 1963–1979. Kiepenheuer und Witsch, Köln 2003, ISBN 978-3-442-73202-9.
- 1968. Worauf wir stolz sein dürfen. Kursbuch Kulturstiftung gGmbH, Hamburg 2018, ISBN 978-3-961-96006-4.
