= Hans-Jürgen Krahl =

West German philosophy student and political activist

- Born: 17 January 1943; Sarstedt, Südhannover-Braunschweig, Germany
- Died: 13 February 1970 (aged 27) north of Marburg, Hesse, West Germany
- Education: Göttingen; IFS, Frankfurt am Main
- Occupations: Student activist Political philosopher
- Known for: Leadership role in the '68 student movement
- Political party: CDU (expelled); SDS

Hans-Jürgen Krahl (17 January 1943 – 13 February 1970) was a West German philosophy student and political activist who came to wider prominence as a participant in the '68 Student Protest movement of which, in the eyes of admirers, he was a leading ideologue.

He was a leading member of the fractious Socialist German Students' League. During the mid-1960s, Krahl became a star student and doctoral pupil of the polymath-philosopher Theodor W. Adorno. Early in 1969, after four years during which Krahl treated Adorno as an academic mentor, there was a falling out between the two men, however. This arose in the context of a student occupation of the University of Frankfurt Institute for Social Research in which Krahl was involved. Adorno, as director of the institute, summoned the police to evict the "trespassing" students on 7 January 1969. Adorno died suddenly later that same year, eleven days after the end of the trial process that followed from the events at the institute.

Krahl himself was only 27 when he was killed, a front-seat passenger in a motor accident on an icy road north of Marburg, barely six months after the death of Adorno. His reputation as the great theoretician of Europe's '68 movement, able and willing to grapple with both the ideological and the economic mechanisms of mature capitalism, persists among scholars of the political left. Much of Krahl's written work, which included large amounts of material delivered orally – albeit in perfectly formed prose structures – and recorded at the time, to be transcribed onto paper only much later, was published posthumously.

== Life ==
=== Provenance and early years ===
Hans-Jürgen Krahl came from a lower-middle class ("kleinbürgerlich" / "petit bourgeois") background in what he later termed "the darkest recesses of Lower Saxony" (aus "den finstersten Teilen Niedersachsens"). He was born in January 1943 at a time when suspicions were stirring among the German people that the Second World War might not end in the promised German victory. Rudolf Krahl, his father, and his mother, born Erna Schulze, were both employed in private sector business. Rudolf Krahl was no fan of the National Socialists during the Hitler years, but nor is there any indication that he engaged actively in political resistance. Where it came to upbringing, Krahl's parents appear to have provided their child with an upbringing marginally more liberal than would have been deemed conventional at the time. Hans-Jürgen was still very small when, probably early in 1944, he lost his right eye during the course of an aerial bomb attack. For the rest of his life he wore an artificial eye. By the time the European war ended in May 1945 the little family had moved to Stettin, but early in 1945 they had joined the flood of refugees desperate to escape from the advancing Soviet army, and ended up back in Sarstedt, the little town a short distance up-river of Hannover. It was in Sarstedt that he spent most of his childhood. When he was 15 the family relocated to Alsfeld, some 100 kilometers further to the south. After he grew up he would look back on both the towns in which he spent his childhood as archetypal examples of conservative "small-town Germany".

According to his own later reports, as a boy Krahl became involved with the "Ludendorffbund", a right-wing extremist political organisation under the leadership (at least till it was outlawed in 1961) of Mathilde Ludendorff, widow of the infamous General Ludendorff 1865-1937. The "Ludendorffbund" was a populist movement dedicated to ethniocationalism and racism and other mystical extremist notions which had fallen out of fashion in western Europe in the aftermath of the twelve year Hitler nightmare, and was in its day regarded as somewhat "niche". By contrast, the CDU (political party), the centre-right party of Konrad Adenauer, of which Krahl became a member in 1961, was widely perceived as the heart of the political mainstream, particularly in the conservatively inclined small town German towns in which Krahl grew up. Nevertheless, as his political journey across the political spectrum continued through the 1960s, Krahl would come to view the CDU, with which he had engaged as an activist member between 1961 and 1963, with much the same level of contempt and distaste that he would epply to the "crypto-nazi" "Ludendorffbund". Meanwhile, he was still living in Alsfeld with his family when he became a "passionate founding member" of an Alsfeld branch of the "Junge Union", the youth wing of the CDU. (Note: Krahl would later describe his two years as an activist member of the CDU as "an enormous step towards enlightenment" ("... ein enormer Schritt an Aufklärung"). It enabled him to embark on "a sort of odyssey through the organisational structures of the ruling classes ("... gewissermaßen eine Odyssee durch die Organisationsformen der herrschenden Klasse hindurch"), and "I would like personally to commend myself for having taken part continuously for two years, with an enormous degree of mental consistency, in the CDU meetings of small town worthies in this dark province" ("... und es gehört, das möchte ich mir ganz persönlich zugute halten, ein enormes Ausmaß auch an psychischer Konsistenz dazu, in dieser finsteren Provinz zwei Jahre kontinuierlich an CDU-Versammlungen von Kleinstadt-Honoratioren teilzunehmen ...").)

=== University student ===
In 1963 Krahl enrolled at the University of Göttingen to study Philosophy, Germanistics, Mathematics and History. At the same time he joined the Coburger Convent Verdensia student fraternity.

By 1964 Krahl had left the CDU Alsfeld party branch. According to Krahl himself, (Note: "...I was thrown out of this ghastly organisation after I had taken an anti-authoritarian stand against an old gentleman" ("Aus dieser schlagenden Verbindung wurde ich allerdings rausgeworfen, nachdem ich einen antiautoritären Aufstand gegen einen Alten Herrn vorgenommen hatte.") .... "After the ruling classes had expelled me [from the Alsfeld CDU ], I determined to betray them completely, and became a member of the SDS" (""Nachdem mich die herrschende Klasse rausgeworfen hatte, entschloß ich mich dann auch, sie gründlich zu verraten, und wurde Mitglied im SDS").) he was expelled from it during an angry disagreement. In 1964 he joined the "Sozialistischer Deutscher Studentenbund" ("Socialist German Students' League" / SDS), an increasinggly radical political organisation, members of which had been expelled from West Germany's centre-left Social Democratic Party (of which it had originally been a part) in 1961, due to disagreements over German re-armament. Rudi Dutschke would join the SDS in 1965, after which the two men successfully led the organisation further away from the traditional political mainstream. By the later 1960s Krahl was widely recognised as one of the SDS's leading exponents of anti-authoritatian socialism.

=== Theodor W. Adorno and the "Frankfurt School" ===
In 1964 or 1965 (sources differ) Krahl switched to the so-called Frankfurt School of the "Institut für Sozialforschung" (IfS / "Institute for Social Research") which at that time was still a stand-alone institution (though it has subsequently been reincorporated into the Goethe University in Frankfurt). The lure was the opportunity to study with Theodor W. Adorno, who would have a decisive and lasting influence on him.

In 1965 he began work on his doctoral dissertation on the "Natural Law of the Capitalist Movement applying the definitions derived by Karl Marx" ("Naturgesetz der kapitalistischen Bewegung bei Marx"). (Note: "Naturgesetz" ("Natural law") is a term defined by Karl Marx in his own terms for his own purposes. Readers familiar with Marxism in some depth will probably be equipped to define it appropriately.) The doctorate was supervised by Adorno himself. Sources identify Krahl as "Adorno's favourite student", recalling that Krahl was the only one of Adorno's students or staff members at the IFS whom Adorno was prepared to debate on a basis of intellectual equality. It is said that Krahl was blessed with an excellent memory and power of recall and that he was exceptionally lucid. In terms of socialist political philosophy, he had found the time and opportunity to become well-read in the subject. He was also hugely respectful of his doctoral mentor-supervisor, from whom he drew numerous key concepts of the "Frankfurt School critical theory", which he applied in a number of philosophical-political writings of his own.

Krahl's break with his philosophical father figure came after four years. A student occupation took place at the IFS on 7 January 1969 which Adorno and his senior colleagues at the institute invited police to evict. In Frankfurt the public mood in respect of student protests had been somewhat heated for more than half a year, and the police unhesitatingly complied with the request of the Institute authorities. Following the eviction, police arrested 76 of the students involved, including Krahl, the favourite pupil whom by many criteria Adorno had at this point vehemently disowned.

Adorno was painfully conscious of the brutal irony whereby "a piece of political theater" had left him identified by many of his students as a defender of conservative repression. He attempted to resume lecturing in June 1969, but active hostility from students who favoured “extra-parliamentary opposition” and who might previously idolised him prevented it. A few weeks later, on 18 July 1969, he found himself invited to testify at Krahl's trial on a charge of breaching the peace. If, as some commentators seem to have anticipated, Krahl was hoping to be able to recreate the Athenian Agora in a Frankfurt court room in order to engage in a very public debate on the fundamentals of critical theory with its most important theoretician, he was disappointed. It is hard to be confident that Adorno was unaffected by the months of ad hominem attacks from IFS radical students who identified a polarised battle between himself and his (formerly) favourite pupil, however. The trial that followed may have been the last straw. A few weeks later, he took a break with his wife, visiting Zermatt where, in defiance of medical advice, he took a hike into the mountains and suffered a heart attack. He died in a Swiss hospital on 6 August 1969. Krahl's own death followed only six months later.

=== Sigrid Rüger and the "tomatoes incident" ===
On 13 September 1968, Krahl was involved, unintentionally, in an incident at the 23rd delegates' conference of the SDS which some have characterised as the launching pad for second-wave feminism in West Germany. The conference was held at Frankfurt am Main, which was Krahl's home city and, importantly, home to a number of nationally distributed West German and international newspapers along with many of their journalists. As a leading member of the SDS, Krahl was one of those seated in a single row along the front of the stage, facing the main body of the hall. In the main hall, on one side of the room, was grouped a small party of women from the Action Council for women's liberation. Unbeknownst to the conference organisers, the women were on a mission of their own. Not all of them were SDS members. One who was a relatively prominent member within the SDS was Sigrid Rüger, heavily pregnant and highly visible, in addition, on account of her very red hair. Something these women shared was a belief that among the SDS (male) student leaders, there was a singular absence of empathy with feminist viewpoints and issues.

Another of the women in the group was Helke Sander an activist film-maker originally from Berlin who had recently returned to Germany after several years living and working in Helsinki. Sander stood up and, taking the organisers by surprise, delivered a speech. There seems to have been some frantic sotto-voce discussion among the SDS leaders seated on the stage over how to shut this woman up; but in the event most delegates listened in relative silence. It was quite a short speech, but nevertheless managed to tackle in some depth several of the priorities of the feminists' Action Council. It concluded with a rousing plea:

"Comrades, if you are not yet ready for this discussion, which needs to be conducted on the basis of substantive issues, then we will have established that the SDS is nothing more than an over-inflated bubble of counter-revolutionary uncooked dough. The women comrades will then know what conclusions to draw."

There seems to have been some irritation from the conference organisers that their carefully devised schedule had been disrupted, and there was a firm refusal to allow still more time to be taken up with any discussion of Sander's speech. On the part of the Action Council women there was clearly a concern that the speech might simply be ignored by the conference and thereafter quickly forgotten. Sigrid Rüger, for one, was determined that this should not happen. Afflicted, in the context of her pregnancy, by a powerful dietary craving, Rüger had arrived at the conference clutching a large box of tomatoes, which she had placed on the table in front of her. She now threw several (according to some sources, three) tomatoes in the direction of the row of male SDS leaders on the stage, uttering an exclamation addressed, according to some sources, to Hans-Jürgen Krahl as she did it. One of them hit Hans-Jürgen Krahl, who was deep in discussion with a neighbour. (Note: "Comrade Krahl, you are a genuine counter-revolutionary and a representative of the class enemy [when it comes to rights for women]" ("Genosse Krahl, du bist objektiv ein Konterrevolutionär und ein Agent des Klassenfeindes dazu").) It was later reported by some that she had been aiming not at Krahl (who was gay and, in a number of ways, the complete opposite of a misogynist) but at the face of Helmut Schauer the SDS president at the time. Thrown vegetables or eggs were a much loved protest device during this period. Preferred targets in West Germany were politicians and other establishment figures perceived by the throwers as more than averagely reactionary. The attention grabbing difference on this occasion was that the thrown tomatoes came from a group of SDS women: their target was the (male) leadership circle of their own student socialist organisation. Krahl was a sensitive man and by this time assumed by many comrades to be suffering from alcoholism. He was deeply upset. "That evening Krahl sat in the bath and cried", recalled a mutual friend, Tilman Fichter, speaking to a reporter: "Then Sigrid came round to comfort him. That's how she was". (Note: "Der Krahl lag abends in der Badewanne und weinte ... Da kam die Sigrid und tröstete ihn. So war sie".)

From the point of view of the women from the Action Council, the tomato throwing incident was a great success. The objectives of the feminist activists had recaptured a place high up on the mainstream media agenda, which, in Germany, they would retain for many years.

=== Peace prize affair ===
On 16 October 1969 Krahl was back before a court. This time he was charged with "participating in the leadership of a breach of the peace" ("Aufruhrs und des Landfriedensbruchs als Rädelsführer"). He was identified by the court, along with his co-accused, Günter Amendt and Karl Dietrich Wolff as one of three leading members of the SDS who had taken part in a demonstration against the awarding of the "Peace Prize of the German Book Trade" to Président Senghor of Senegal. The court was told that demonstration had taken place outside Frankfurt's (hugely symbolic for believers in democracy) "Paulskirche" on 22 September 1969 without the required authorisation. By this time a number of other pending trials against each of the defendants were building up in the pipeline of the criminal justice system. In respect of the case of the Senaglaese president and his peace prize, the verdict came through on 24 December 1969. The three defendants were all found guilty, and each was sentenced to a 21-month prison term. Krahl's application to appeal the verdict was granted however. In the end he never served any part of the prison sentence.

"Krahl?: there are wolves living inside him"
"In Krahl, da hausen die Wölfe"

Theodor W. Adorno

"He was the cleverest of us all"
"Er war der Klügste von uns allen"

Rudi Dutschke

"... the most intelligent, resolute and intellectually robust mind among the student leaders"
"... der intelligenteste und konsequenteste Kopf der Studentenführer"

Karl Heinz Bohrer

=== Death ===
Late at night on 13 February 1970 Hans-Jürgen Krahl was a passenger in the front seat of a car travelling from Paderborn towards Marburg the B252 (main road). Conditions were icy and the car was involved in a collision with an oncoming truck near Wrexen (Diemelstadt). Krahl was killed instantly. Franz-Josef Bevermeier from Paderborn who had been driving the car at the time of the collision was taken to a hospital where he died three hours later. Three other passengers in the car were badly injured.

== Philosophical development ==
As a doctoral student of Theodor Adorno, Krahl diverged from Adorno's Frankfurt School Critical theory social critique, and built on ideas inferred from it in his doctoral dissertation and subsequent written work. He derived and evolved from it a "thesis of the technical-scientific intelligentsia", which provides definition and impulse for the centrality of "thought labour" and "mass intellectual output" in late-stage capitalist societies.

With these analyses, Krahl pursues a line of reasoning already resonating at the Frankfurt School, while foreshadowing analyses which, in the years ahead, would lead many militants and thinkers of the left to dismiss the revolutionary role of the factory worker class as being of diminished relevance.

After Rudi Dutschke was shot in West-Berlin "by a protnazi attacker" and seriously incapacitated on 11 April 1968, Krahl found himself expected by SDS comrades to fill the void that had opened up in respect of on some of the charismatic and intellectual leadership roles that Dutsche had hitherto occupied. Krahl's leadership within the SDS differed from that of Dutschke. He tended, some believed, to treat the SDS as "a production facility for theories of the proletariat" rather than as an organisation of direct political militancy.

The so-called Prague Spring and the ensuing Soviet-led invasion of Czechoslovakia in August 1968 represented a series of events on which Krahl expressed himself with robust clarity. Like Dutschke, he was powerfully positive about attempts by the Dubček government to re-normalise Socialism outside the authoritarian constraints of Stalinism's enduring legacy. On the other hand, he was openly disappointed by the Prague reformers' vision of and alternative socialist model which was, he asserted, less than radical. After the Soviet tanks had rolled into Prague, Krahl shared his opinion that the "Soviet counter-revolution [had] prematurely and violently closed down the possibility – not without its own contradictions – of pursuing the revolutionary liberation struggle on the home turf of European socialism".

== Legacy ==
- The year following his death a volume was compiled and published comprising the collected writings of Hans-Jürgen Krahl. It had been re-published a number of times. The 2005 (fourth German-language) re-issue runs to 440 pages.
- SDS membership had peaked at around 2,500 in 1968. Immediately after Krahl's death the organisation seemed to lose not merely its voice, but its entire sense of direction and purpose. It fell into a rapid succession of crises culminating, formally on 21 March 1970, in its dissolution. It was not forgotten, however, notably in Italy, where the published work of Hans-Jürgen Krahl and actions undertaken by the SDS during its time under his influence and leadership created a defining point of reference for the "Movimento del '77" (an anti-parliamentary leftwing student uprising largely confined to university students in Bologna, Milan, Turin and Rome). Tellingly, many of the currently available sources for the life of Hans-Jürgen Krahl are published not in German but in Italian.
- Krahl's criticisms targeting ("from within") Frankfurt School thinking still resonate powerfully, especially those aimed at his sometime intellectual nemesis, Jürgen Habermas.

== Celebration ==
- In August 2005, shortly after Krahl's grave had been leveled because there were no longer any living relatives willing and able to pay for its maintenance, Hannover's Mayor Schmalstieg intervened to secure the grave plot, contributing to the costs.
- A group of friends teamed up to collect money for grave maintenance and, on 27 June 2007, oversaw the placing of a modernist replacement gravestone, designed by Uwe Spiekermann, on Krahl's flattened grave plot. The main speaker at the inauguration the new memorial stone was Adorno's biographer Detlev Claussen, and the man who 37 years earlier had already delivered the funeral oration at Krahl's funeral.
- During the first part of 2007 work, under the auspices of the "DenkArt Verein" began on the "Hans-Jürgen Krahl Archive". Start-up finance came from the Frankfurt city council.
