= Heike Klippel =

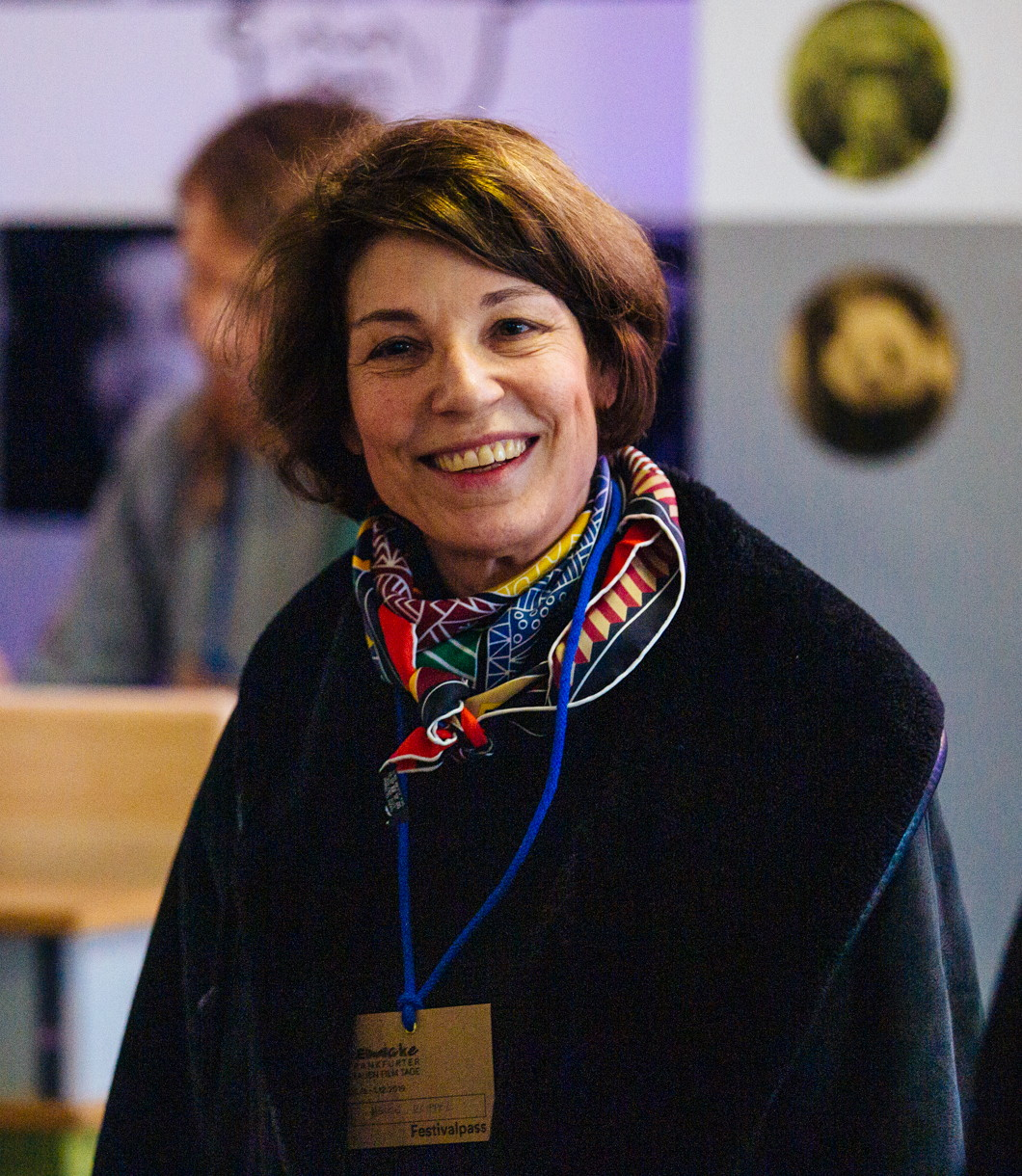
Heike Klippel (2019)

Heike Klippel (born 1960) is a German film and media studies scholar. She teaches at the Hochschule für Bildende Künste Braunschweig, is one of the co-editors of the magazine Frauen und Film and was a founding member of the Kinothek Asta Nielsen e. V.

== Career ==
Klippel studied German studies, philosophy, sociology, theater studies, film and television studies at the Johann Wolfgang Goethe University in Frankfurt am Main from 1980. While her master's thesis dealt with texts (topic: "The private diary - reflections on everyday texts"), she turned to film for her doctorate. With the dissertation topic "Memory and Cinema", she investigated the connections between memory theory and the emergence of film as a medium. From 1991 to 1994, she was a research assistant at the University of Siegen's Collaborative Research Center 240, "Aesthetics and Pragmatics of Screen Media", where she worked on the sub-project "History and Development of British and American Influence on Television Programmes in West Germany". After completing her doctorate, Klippel worked from 1996 to 2002 as a research assistant at the Institute for Theater, Film and Media Studies at Johann Wolfgang Goethe University.

Klippel has been a professor at the Institute for Media Studies (IMW) at the Braunschweig University of Art in the Media Studies program since 2002. Her main focus is "History and Theory of Film". Klippel is currently working on "Everyday Life in Feature Film" (as of 2021) Das Projekt „Giftdiskurse in Film- und Wissenschaftsgeschichte: Das Giftmotiv im Film“ wurde 2013 bis 2015 von der Deutschen Forschungsgemeinschaft (DFG) gefördert.

Klippel's publication and lecture activities include linking academic and non-academic audiences. For example, she organized the event series "The Art of Programming" in the winter semester of 2005, in which curators from film festivals were able to present their work Die Ergebnisse wurden später auch als Buch veröffentlicht.

Klippel's work focuses on memory theories, the history and theory of the concept of programming and time/everyday life as well as, for example, series analysis, feminist film theory, early cinema and experimental film, So ist sie z. B. Mitherausgeberin der Schriften der Experimentalfilmemacherin Birgit Hein and an anthology of essays on the work of film and video artist Corinna Schnitt.

== Feminist commitment and extramural activities ==
Klippel's feminist commitment was already apparent during her doctoral phase. From 1990, she worked on the editorial board and as an author of the magazine Frauen und Film. Since 2005, she has been co-editor of the magazine,

In 1999, Klippel was one of the co-founders of the Kinothek Asta Nielsen e. V. in Frankfurt am Main. The association is committed to rediscovering, archiving and presenting the film work of the new women's movement and to making female film art visible in general. In her event series "The Art of Programming", Klippel gave Heide Schlüpmann, at the time a professor of film studies in Frankfurt am Main, and Karola Gramann, the then curator and artistic director of the Kinothek Asta Nielsen e. V., the opportunity to publicize the work of the Kinothek, thus combining academic work and cinematic activism.

Klippel is also a member of the Film- und Medienbüro Niedersachsen.

In 2018, Klippel, together with Matthias Dell and Katja Wiederspahn, was a member of the jury for the 3sat-Förderpreis, which is awarded as part of the International Short Film Festival Oberhausen.

Since 2019, the film prize "Die TILDA" has been awarded at the Braunschweig International Film Festival, which is intended to make women filmmakers visible and promote them. Klippel was one of the founders and sat on the jury for the award in 2019 and 2020.
