= Klippel =

Klippel is a German surname. Notable people with the surname include:

- Maurice Klippel (1858–1942), French physician
  - Klippel–Feil syndrome
  - Klippel–Trénaunay–Weber syndrome
- Robert Klippel (1920–2001), Australian constructivist sculptor and teacher
- Heike Klippel (born 1960), German film and media studies scholar
- Christoph Klippel (born 1986), German footballer
