= Gramann =

Gramann is a surname. Notable people with the surname include:

- Daniel Gramann (born 1987), Austrian football defender
- Johann Gramann (1487–1541), German pastor, theologian, teacher, humanist
- Karola Gramann (born 1948), German film scholar and film curator
