= Silvia Bovenschen =

German feminist literary critic, author and essayist

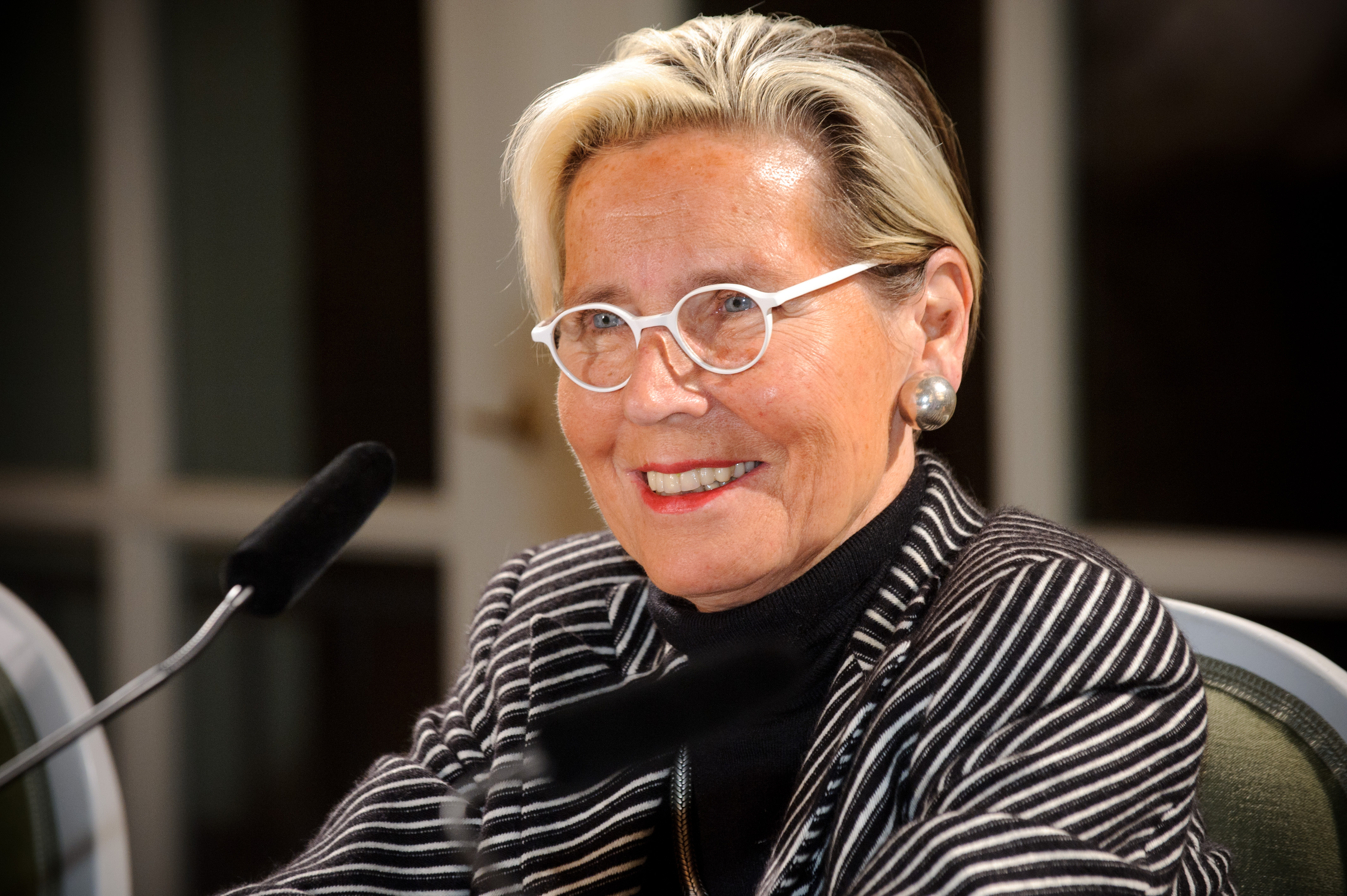
Bovenschen in November 2011

Silvia Bovenschen (5 March 1946 in Point bei Waakirchen, Upper Bavaria — 25 October 2017 in Berlin) was a German feminist literary critic, author and essayist.

== History ==
Bovenschen was the daughter of a public limited company director. She grew up in Frankfurt am Main, where she later studied literature, sociology and philosophy. In the course of the protests of 1968, she co-founded the women's council of the Socialist German Student Union. In 1979, she earned a doctorate from the Goethe University Frankfurt with her work Die imaginierte Weiblichkeit ("The imagined femininity"). This essay is regarded as a standard work of feminism.

In her mid-twenties, she found out she had multiple sclerosis. However, she taught at the Goethe University Frankfurt for twenty years before she had to stop because of her illness. In 2003, she moved to Berlin and started writing novels. Her best-seller Älter werden. Notizen. was released in 2006.

In 2011, Bovenschen was elected a member of the Academy of Arts in Berlin. She became a member of the German Academy for Language and Literature in 2013.

Bovenschen lived in Charlottenburg, Berlin with her partner Sarah Schumann (1933–2019). Bovenschen died from her illness on October 25, 2017. Her finished novel Lug & Trug & Rat & Streben was released posthumously in 2018.

In an interview just before her death, Bovenschen described herself as an intellectual and a feminist who emphasised on "style" and "beauty".

== Works ==
- Die imaginierte Weiblichkeit. Exemplarische Untersuchungen zu kulturgeschichtlichen und literarischen Präsentationsformen des Weiblichen. Suhrkamp, Frankfurt am Main 1979, ISBN 3-518-10921-9
- Schlimmer machen, schlimmer lachen. Aufsätze und Streitschriften. Verlag der Autoren, Frankfurt am Main 1998, ISBN 3-88661-199-X.
- Über-Empfindlichkeit. Spielformen der Idiosynkrasie. Suhrkamp, Frankfurt am Main 2000, ISBN 3-518-41176-4
- Älter werden. Notizen. S. Fischer, Frankfurt am Main 2006, ISBN 3-10-003512-7
  - Niederländisch: Ouder worden. Übers. Jan Bert Kanon. Atlas, Amsterdam 2008, ISBN 978-90-450-0041-1
- Verschwunden. S. Fischer, Frankfurt am Main 2008, ISBN 978-3-10-003513-4
- Wer weiß was? Eine deutliche Mordgeschichte. S. Fischer, Frankfurt 2009, ISBN 978-3-10-003515-8
- Wie geht es Georg Laub? S. Fischer, Frankfurt am Main 2011, ISBN 978-3-10-003516-5
- Nur Mut. Roman. S. Fischer, Frankfurt am Main 2013, ISBN 978-3-10-003523-3
- Sarahs Gesetz. S. Fischer, Frankfurt am Main 2015, ISBN 978-3-10-002472-5
- Lug & Trug & Rat & Streben. S. Fischer, Frankfurt am Main 2018 (posthumous), ISBN 978-3-10-397355-6

=== As an editor ===
- Die Listen der Mode. Suhrkamp, Frankfurt am Main 1986, ISBN 3-518-11338-0.
- with Winfried Frey, Stefan Fuchs, Walter Raitz and Dieter Seitz: Der fremdgewordene Text. Festschrift für Helmut Brackert zum 65. Geburtstag. Walter de Gruyter, Berlin 1997, ISBN 3-11-014940-0
- with Jörg Bong: Rituale des Alltags. S. Fischer, Frankfurt am Main 2002, ISBN 3-10-003511-9
- with Juliane Beckmann: Von der Freundschaft. Ein Lesebuch. S. Fischer, Frankfurt am Main 2009, ISBN 978-3-596-90227-9

== Awards ==
- 2000: Roswitha Prize
- 2000: Johann-Heinrich-Merck-Preis
- 2007: Ernst-Robert-Curtius-Preis
- 2012: Schiller Prize of the City of Mannheim
- 2014: Honourable prize of the Bayerischer Buchpreis
