= Krahl =

Krahl is a German surname with Sorbian roots (kral = ″king″). Notable people with the surname include:

- Hans-Jürgen Krahl (1943–1970), German student activist
- Hilde Krahl (1917–1999), Austrian actress
- Jim Krahl (born 1955), American football player
- Julian Krahl (born 2000), German footballer
- Karl-Heinz Krahl (1914–1942), German World War II flying ace
