= Georg Stefan Troller =

French journalist and screenwriter (1921–2025)

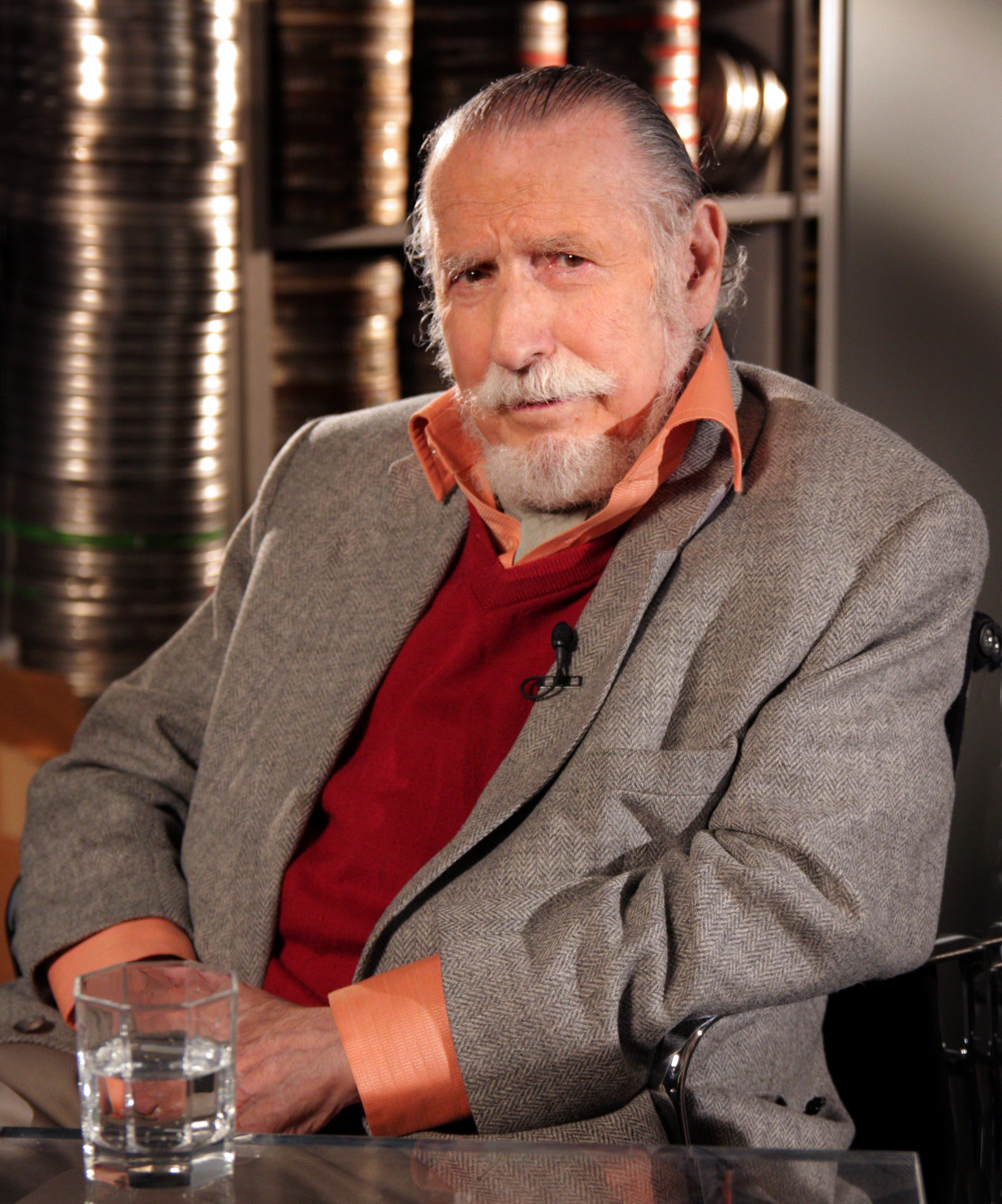
- Troller in 2011
- Born: 10 December 1921; Vienna, Austria
- Died: 27 September 2025 (aged 103); Paris, France
- Education: University of California; Columbia University; University of Paris
- Occupations: Journalist, director, screenwriter
- Years active: 1949–2025
- Awards: See full awards

Georg Stefan Troller (10 December 1921 – 27 September 2025) was an Austrian-born German-language American journalist, writer, director and screenwriter, who became a US-Citizen in WWII and finally settled in Paris in 1949, where he lived until the end of his life.

== Early life ==
Troller was born on 10 December 1921 to a Jewish family. In 1938, he fled Austria from the Nazis, first to Czechoslovakia and from there on to France, where he was interned as an enemy alien. In 1941, he obtained a visa for the United States in Marseille. His parents were able to escape via Portugal.

In the United States, he was drafted into military service in 1943 and participated in the liberation and documentation of the Dachau concentration camp on 29 April 1945, as well as the capture of Munich on 1 May. Serving as an interpreter, he interrogated German prisoners of war. He was present in Munich when Allied troops searched Hitler's private residence. He was stationed in Europe until 1946 and worked for the Rot-Weiß-Rot radio station operated by the U.S. forces.

Back in the United States, Troller studied English at the University of California and theater at Columbia University. In 1949, a Fulbright scholarship for the Sorbonne brought Troller to Paris, where he became a correspondent for Berlin radio station RIAS.

== Career ==
Troller rose to fame with his program Pariser Journal, which aired from 1962 to 1971 on ARD TV. In 1971, he launched his series of unconventional interviews Personenbeschreibung ("Description of a Person ") for ZDF TV. Among the major figures he interviewed were Marlon Brando, Brigitte Bardot, Alain Delon, Woody Allen, Kirk Douglas and Romy Schneider. "A good interview is almost like a confession," he said. Upon his death, Die Welt noted that "Initially, producers frowned upon his subjective interviewing style, as it lacked the requisite neutrality. However, his sensitive and critical approach to interviewing people struck a chord, turning him into a role model amongst other journalists." His screenplays, directed by Axel Corti, have become cult films.

== Death ==
Troller died in Paris, France on 27 September 2025, at the age of 103. He is buried at Montmartre cemetery in Paris, with his second wife Kirsten Troller, née Lerche. His first wife, Davina Troller, née Wynne-Hughes, died in Paris on 16 January 2024 and is buried close by.

== Awards ==
- 1966: Goldene Kamera
- 1967: Adolf-Grimme-Preis
- 1967: Golden Nymph of the Monte-Carlo Television Festival
- 1968: Berliner Kunstpreis
- 1969: Adolf-Grimme-Preis
- 1973: Adolf-Grimme-Preis
- 1975: Dr. Erich Salomon Award
- 1986: Award of the Eduard Rhein Foundation
- 1987: Golden Nymph of the Monte-Carlo Television Festival
- 1987: Adolf-Grimme-Preis
- 1987: Academy Award (nomination)
- 1990: Bambi Award
- 1991: Special Honour of the Adolf-Grimme-Preis
- 1991: Honorary professorship of the State of Bavaria
- 2002: Cross of Merit of the Federal Republic of Germany 1st Class
- 2014: Schiller Prize of the City of Mannheim
- 2017: Grand Decoration of Honour for Services to the Republic of Austria
- 2021: Great Cross of Merit of the Federal Republic of Germany 1st Class
