= Karola Gramann =

German film curator (born 1948)

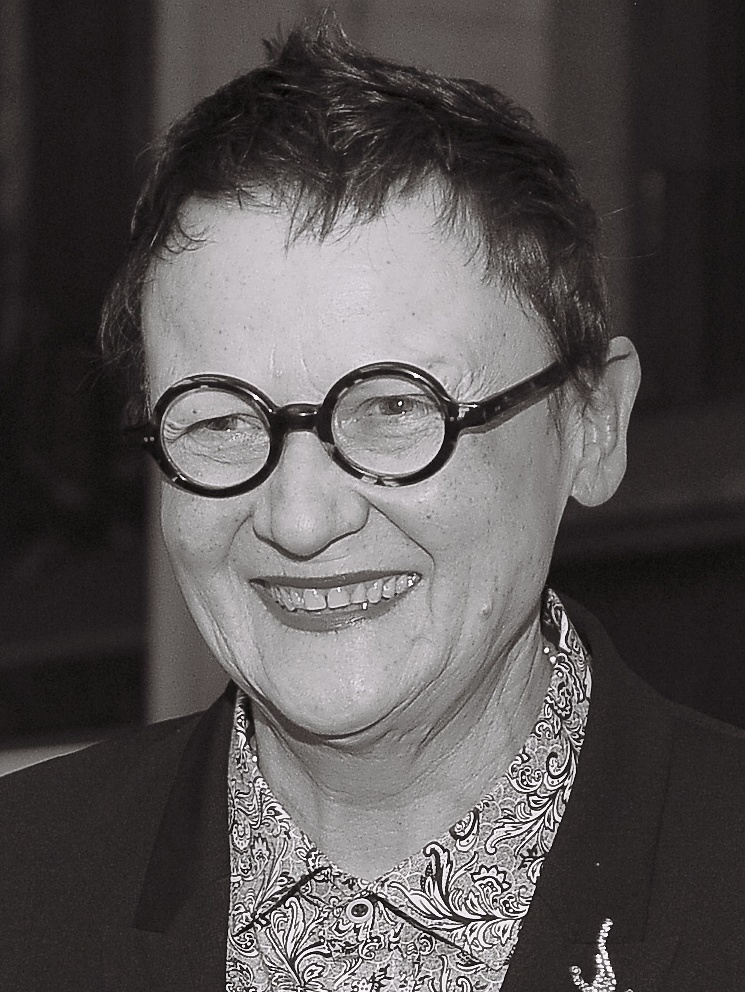
- Karola Gramann in 2015
- Born: 1948; Gerolzhofen, Bavaria
- Occupation: Film scholar

Karola Gramann (born 1948 in Gerolzhofen, Bavaria) is a German film scholar and film curator. From 2006 to 2019 she was artistic director of the Kinothek Asta Nielsen e.V.

== Early life ==
Karola Gramann was born in Gerolzhofen in 1948 and grew up in Würzburg. In the 1960s, she moved to Frankfurt am Main to train as a book manufacturer. There she first completed a traineeship at Suhrkamp Verlag and later moved to S. Fischer Verlag as a production assistant. She completed her A-levels as a second-chance student and studied English, American Studies and Modern German Literature in Frankfurt am Main and London from 1975 to 1983.

== Feminist film and cinema work ==
Karola Gramann has been involved with film and cinema since the mid-1970s. Parallel to her studies, Gramann began her career as a film curator, for which there were still no institutionalized training paths in the 1970s. During a study visit to England in 1975/76, she attended courses at the British Film Institute (BFI) Summerschool in Stirling. In lectures by Laura Mulvey, Claire Johnston, Richard Dyer, Stuart Hall and Angela Martin, among others, Gramann focused on topics such as feminist film theory, the confrontation between the avant-gardes and Marxist positions, Hollywood cinema and the beginnings of gay and lesbian criticism of the dominant cinema. In 1977/78, she continued her studies in London at the Polytechnic of Central London, now the University of Westminster, while also attending evening classes at the BFI with Richard Dyer. Further film studies followed in Frankfurt am Main with the pioneers of German-language feminist-critical film studies Christine Noll Brinckmann, Gertrud Koch, Karsten Witte and Heide Schlüpmann. Her work focuses on feminist, lesbian and queer positions, gender relations visible in films and women as actors in film history. She also focuses on experimental films, film in its materiality and the history of cinema.

Karola Gramann has been publishing essays and books on film since 1975. She curates and presents films herself, always focusing on "resistant", hidden cinema: During her studies, for example, she translated the key text of feminist film theory "Visual Pleasure and Narrative Cinema" (1975) by Laura Mulvey into German. She worked internationally as a freelance film curator, including for the Frauenfilmtage in der Schweiz (Die Frau mit der Kamera, 1985) and for the German Goethe-Institut: she also showed the short film program Seeking, Finding, Remembering (1987) with film productions from the Federal Republic of Germany from 1948 to 1984 in Southeast Asia, Southeast Europe and the USA.

Until 1983, Karola Gramann was a member of the editorial staff of the feminist film magazine Frauen und Film, founded in 1974 in Berlin by the director Helke Sander (since 1983 Stroemfeld Verlag, Frankfurt am Main) and has been a staff member and author of the internationally important and in Europe only periodical on the subject of feminism and film ever since. She was also one of the founding editors of "Feministische Studien" (De Gruyter Verlag, Berlin). The first issue under the editorship of Karola Gramann and Heide Schlüpmann appeared with the title "In den Brüchen der Zeit" in 1982.
