= Schiller Prize of the City of Mannheim =

German award

The Schiller Prize of the City of Mannheim has been awarded by the City of Mannheim since 1954. It was donated on the occasion of the 175th anniversary of the National Theatre. The prize is awarded every two years and endowed with €20,000. It is awarded for "outstanding contribution to cultural development". Supported by a jury, the municipal council decides the winner. From 27 July 1783 to 9 April 1785, Friedrich Schiller lived and worked as a theater poet in Mannheim. Schiller's The Robbers was premiered 1782 in Mannheim.

== Recipients ==
- 1954 Mary Wigman
- 1956 Jürgen Fehling
- 1958 Friedrich Dürrenmatt
- 1960 Theodor Eschenburg
- 1962 Elisabeth Bergner
- 1964 Golo Mann
- 1966 Carl Wurster
- 1968 Hartmut von Hentig
- 1970 Ida Ehre
- 1972 Peter Handke
- 1974 Horst Janssen
- 1978 Peter Stein
- 1982 Leonie Ossowski
- 1986 Dieter Hildebrandt
- 1990 Lea Rosh
- 1994 Alfred Grosser
- 1998 Wolfgang Menge
- 2002 Frank Castorf
- 2005 Rhythm Is It!
- 2006 Nico Hofmann
- 2010 Jan Philipp Reemtsma
- 2012 Silvia Bovenschen
- 2014 Georg Stefan Troller
- 2016 Klaus Theweleit
- 2018 Uwe Timm
- 2020 Christian Petzold
- 2022 Emine Sevgi Özdamar
- 2024 Golineh Atai
