= Emine Sevgi Özdamar =

Turkish writer

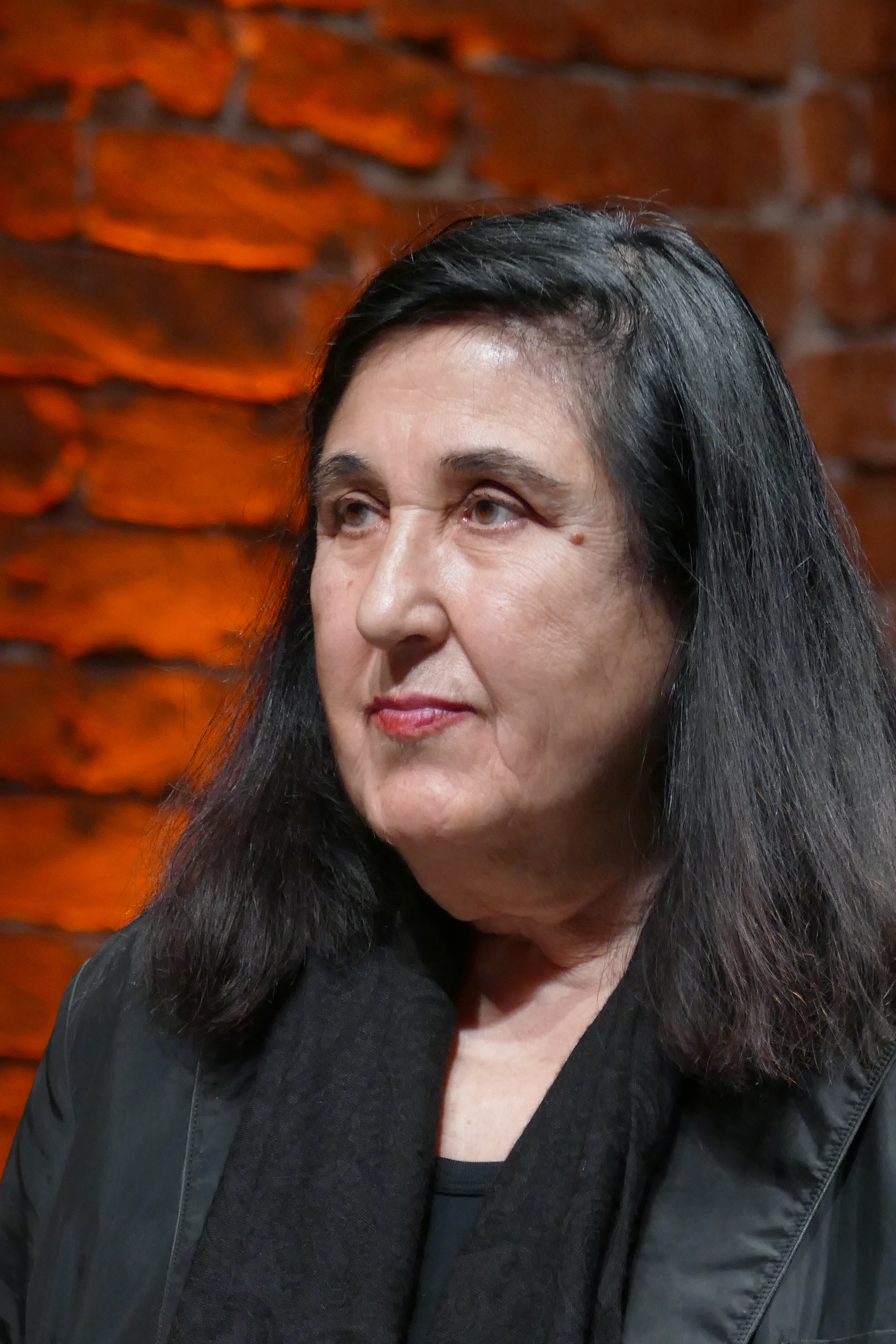
- Born: Emine Sevgi Özdamar; 10 August 1946 (age 79); Malatya, Turkey
- Occupation: Writer

Emine Sevgi Özdamar (born 10 August 1946) is a writer, director, and actress of Turkish origin who has lived and worked in Germany since 1976. Özdamar's art is distinctive in that it is influenced by her life experiences, which straddle the countries of Germany and Turkey throughout times of turmoil in both. One of her most notable accomplishments is winning the 1991 Ingeborg Bachmann Prize.

Özdamar's literary work has received much recognition and scholarly attention. A lover of poetry, she found great inspiration in the works of Heinrich Heine and Bertolt Brecht, especially from an album of the latter's songs which she had bought in the 1960s in Berlin. She later decided to study with Brecht's disciple Benno Besson in Berlin, where she resides.

== Personal life ==
Emine Sevgi Özdamar was born 10 August 1946 in Malatya, Turkey. She grew up with her grandparents and lived in the Turkish cities of Istanbul and Bursa. In 1965, she travelled to Berlin for the first time and got a job in a factory there. She originally came to Germany to be near her older brother, Ali, who studied in Switzerland at the time; it was easier to move to Germany than to Switzerland. Özdamar had acted and performed plays since she was twelve years old and originally wanted to do both when she came to Europe: acting and seeing her brother. Özdamar's parents were against their 18-year-old daughter's plan, but gave in eventually.

Özdamar lived in a residence in West Berlin with 120 other Turkish women. Initially she did not speak a word of German, so she faced the challenges of learning the language as an adult. Özdamar began by memorizing street names and headlines of newspapers without knowing the actual meaning behind them. After seven months, her father finally paid for her to take language classes at the Goethe Institute in order to learn the language properly.

Özdamar still wanted to become an actress, so she went back to Istanbul after two years, where she started to take acting lessons and got her first big roles in theatre productions. In 1971, a military coup in Istanbul resulted in persecution of citizens and had a great effect on citizens' freedom of speech. Due to this coup, in 1976 Özdamar moved back to Germany and fell in love with the German language and authors like Bertolt Brecht. She worked as a director's assistant for the Volksbühne in East Berlin, while living in West Berlin. While touring with a play she also lived in France for another two years, before coming back to Germany and working at a theatre in Bochum in 1979. She currently lives in Kreuzberg, Berlin with her husband Karl Kneidl.

== Literary career ==
=== Major works ===
In 1990, Özdamar published her debut short stories collection, Mutterzunge (Mothertongue). It was named "International Book of the Year" by the Times Literary Supplement. The short stories explore the identity of a Turkish woman living in Germany and how inextricably linked to language this identity is. The narrator has lost her mother tongue, Turkish, and speaks fluent, but flawed, German. The narrator remembers an occasion when she and her mother were speaking Turkish, "Meine Mutter sagte mir: 'Weißt du, du sprichst so, du denkst, daß du alles erzählst, aber plötzlich springst du über nichtgesagte Wörter'" (My mother said to me: 'You know, you talk as though you think you're telling me everything, but you suddenly jump over unsaid words'). Özdamar points out that with "tongue", she did not mean language, but the physical tongue in her mother's mouth, "ein warmes Körperteil, die Liebesquelle meiner Sprache, meiner Gefühle, meiner Kindheit, meiner Jugend." ("the warm body part, the love source of my language, my feelings, my childhood, my adolescence.")

Emine Sevgi Özdamar's first novel, Das Leben ist eine Karawanserei hat zwei Türen aus einer kam ich rein aus der anderen ging ich raus (Life is a Caravanserai : Has Two Doors I Went in One I Came out the Other), published in 1992, earned her the prestigious Ingeborg Bachmann prize (1991) for single chapters from the novel. This made her the first author of Turkish origin to win the prize and gained her international recognition as a novelist. In the novel, the unnamed first narrator traces life from childhood and adolescence in Turkey, to moving from one place in Turkey to another as the father searches for employment, and at last to the narrator's final departure from her family to Germany in order to start a new life. The text is impressionistic, filled with immediacy and sensual narration, but makes no attempt to unify these episodes.

The first novel ends there, where the second one, Die Brücke vom Goldenen Horn (The Bridge of the Golden Horn), published in 1998, begins: the 19 year old leaving for Germany. She travels by train to Berlin and stays there as a guest worker. It is the 1960s, the time of free love and student protests. She eventually travels back to Turkey, where she recognizes that her absence has changed everything. After that, in 2001, Özdamar publishes another short story collection, Der Hof im Spiegel (The Courtyard in the Mirror). The narrator observes through the window of her apartment. There are cities: Berlin, Amsterdam, Istanbul. Or a theatre. A train full of guest workers. The living room of an old man. The narrator is standing in the kitchen, on the phone, and watching life in the courtyard happen in her mirror. The mirror also holds all the dead. She speaks of „her Berlin", the first and the second Berlin (separated by 9 years of distance, the first being West-Berlin, the second East-Berlin), the impressions of Istanbul; she speaks of death, of love, of sorrow, of pleasure, and does so while moving through space and time.

Her novel, 2003, Seltsame Sterne starren zur Erde (Strange Stars Stare at the Earth), describes Özdamar's time working at the Volksbühne theatre in East-Berlin. She lives in Wedding and finds herself in No Man's Land between East and West Berlin. At the time (1970's), Istanbul was fraught with unrest. Certain things were not allowed to be said; Özdamar has found a place for these words to be said on the stage in the theatre in Berlin.

Her 2007 book Kendi Kendinin Terzisi Bir Kambur, Ece Ayhan'lı anılar, 1974 Zürih günlüğü, Ece Ayhan'ın mektupları (The Hunchback as his own Tailor, Memories of Ece Ayhan: The Zurich Diary of 1974 and Letters from Ece Ayhan) was her first to be written in Turkish. It draws upon diary entries connected to her friendship with director Vasif Öngören.

In 2021, Özdamar published the novel Ein von Schatten begrenzter Raum to much critical acclaim, with RBB Kultur reporter Katharina Döbler describing it as "magnificent" and it landing on the shortlist for the 2022 Leipzig Book Fair Prize.

=== Major themes ===
Migration "I am a person who prefers to be in transit. My favourite place is to sit on the train between the countries. The train is a beautiful home."

Özdamar's work is often partially autobiographical. The train between Germany and Turkey, between Europe and Asia is the landscape, which closely describes the life and the work of Emine Sevgi Özdamar. In her most autobiographical texts, Özdamar takes the reader with her on these train journeys between two worlds, where one can experience the complexity of feelings and impressions that come with migration, with moving to a new space, returning to the old, and finding oneself in-between strangeness and familiarity. „Özdamar has made migration a key conceptual and aesthetic programme in her work", so the jury states after congratulating Özdamar on winning the 2001 Nordrhein-Westfalen artist award (Künstlerinnenpreis).

Identity, German-Turkish Identity

Özdamar's prose "often calls attention to the heterogeneity of Turkish culture and so represents an important intervention in the nationalist discourses of 'Turkishness' circulating in both Turkey and Germany." In her short story collection Der Hof im Spiegel (Courtyard in the Mirror, 2001), for example, she writes „Ich liebe das Wort Gastarbeiter, ich sehe immer zwei Personen vor mir. Einer ist Gast und sitzt da, der andere arbeitet" (I love the word guest-worker, I always see two people in front of me. One is a guest and sits there; the other one works). Özdamar's texts also undermine any notion of an 'original' Turkish identity; her texts are concerned with tradition and its decontextualization, and raise questions of what role tradition plays in the formation of identity.

Modern Scholarship and Interpretations

Özdamar's winning of the Ingeborg Bachmann Prize led to a wide reaching discussion on what constitutes German literature and Emine Sevgi Özdamar became the "leading light" of what is called Turkish-German literature. This insular and limited term has been critiqued by Özdamar herself, who would rather be seen as an individual than part of a category. Early scholarship often looked at Özdamar's work through a sociological lens focusing on language, identity and life writing. In the 2000s, Özdamar's work was more closely interlinked with postcolonial theory and accentuated her dealing with memory, translation and intertextuality. Later perspectives through which Özdamar's work was reflected on take on a more philosophical and aesthetic form and bring her in conversation with thinkers and artists such as Deleuze and Guattari or the early Surrealists.

== Style and influences ==
One of Özdamar's identifiers is her unique language, which she created partially through a literal translation of Turkish expressions or catchwords, through playing with philosophical and literary quotations, and the Broken German used by the guest workers. The result was: "Deutschland, ein Wörtermärchen" (Germany, a Words-Fairytale—a play on Heine's Deutschland. Ein Wintermärchen). "Damals kam ich auf die Idee von Deutschland als Tür, durch die man hinein- oder hinausgeht. Und auf die Frage: Was passiert dabei mit der Sprache?" (Back then, an idea came to me of Germany as a door, through which one walks in or walks out. And I thought of the question: What happens to language then?", she says in a lively Café in Berlin-Kreuzberg.

Influences include Faulkner, Joyce, Wilder, Tennessee Williams, Joseph Conrad, Böll and Brecht, and contemporary Turkish poets such as Can Yücel, Ece Ayhan, Orhan Veli and Jewish-German poet Else Lasker-Schüler."Durch sie habe ich eine Zeit erfahren, nach der ich immer Sehnsucht hatte, die Zeit vor den Katastrophen."(Through her I experienced a time I had always longed for, the time before the catastrophes.), Özdamar recounts.

== Acting/Directing Career ==
Upon her return to Istanbul in 1967, Özdamar enrolled in a well-known acting school until 1970. Her interests were already present before her initial period in Germany, but was only further solidified through an encounter with a left-wing Turkish director in Berlin, Vasif Öngören. In Turkey, she would also go on to star in Öngören's Turkish productions of Peter Weiss's Marat/Sade and Bertolt Brecht's Mann ist Mann, amongst others. It was at this time that she also became involved in the Turkish workers' party. This, however, came to an end with the Turkish military putsch of 1971. Diaries of this friendship form the basis of her most recent book and also first of her prose to be written in Turkish, Kendi Kendinim Terzisi Bir Kambur, Ece Ayhan'lı anılar, 1974 Zürih günlüğü, Ece Ayhan'ın makrupları (The Hunchback as his own Tailor, Memories of Ece Ayhan: The Zurich Diary of 1974 and Letters from Ece Ayhan).

When Özdamar returned to Germany in 1976, she secured a position as director's assistant at the well-known Volksbühne theatre to Swiss director Benno Besson. There she worked very closely within Brecht's theatrical practice with people such as Matthias Langhoff, Manfred Karge and Heiner Müller, before moving for a short time to France to continue working with Besson and study for a PhD in theatre. Özdamar's connection to theatre persisted into the 1980s with a certain period spent as director's assistant and actress at Claus Peymann's Bochumer Ensemble in West Germany. The interesting intersection of East-German Post-Brechtian theatre together with German-influence Turkish schools of the 1960s and 1970s is evident in both Özdamar's writing style for theatre as well as diverse theatre performances. She has also acted in various films depicting Turkish-Germany, earning herself the title "Mutter aller Filmtürken" (Mother of all Turks on Film).

== Awards ==
- Ingeborg Bachmann Prize (1991)
- Walter-Hasenclever-Literaturpreis (1993)
- New-York Scholarship of the Literaturfonds Darmstadt (1995)
- Adelbert-von-Chamisso-Preis (1999)
- Künstlerinnenpreis NRW (2001)
- Stadtschreiber von Bergen (2003)
- Kleist Prize (2004)
- Kunstpreis Berlin (Fontane Prize) (2009)
- Carl Zuckmayer Medal (2010)
- Alice Salomon Poetic Prize (2012)
- Roswitha Prize (2021)
- Bayerischer Buchpreis (2021)
- Düsseldorfer Literaturpreis (2022)
- Georg Büchner Prize (2022)
- Schiller Prize of the City of Mannheim (2022)
- Bertolt-Brecht-Literaturpreis (2026)

== Works ==
- Karagöz in Alamania, (play, 1982)
- Mutterzunge, (short stories, 1990, ISBN 3-88022-106-5) The issue Maman/Mutter 2018 of the literary review la mer gelée published a version of the story Mutterzunge (in German, together with a French translation), slightly corrected by the author.
- Keleoğlan in Alamania, (play, 1991)
- Das Leben ist eine Karawanserei hat zwei Türen aus einer kam ich rein aus der anderen ging ich raus, (novel, 1992, ISBN 3-462-02319-5) engl. "Life is a Caravanserai Has Two Doors I Went in One I Came out the Other" tr. Luise von Flotow UMiddlesex Press 2000.
- Die Brücke vom Goldenen Horn, (novel, 1998, ISBN 3-7632-4802-1), engl. The Bridge of the Golden Horn, publisher: Serpent's Tail, 2009, ISBN 1-85242-932-1
- Der Hof im Spiegel, (short stories, 2001, ISBN 3-462-03001-9)
- Seltsame Sterne starren zur Erde, (novel, 2003, ISBN 3-462-03212-7)
- Kendi Kendinin Terzisi Bir Kambur, Ece Ayhan'lı anılar, 1974 Zürih günlüğü, Ece Ayhan'ın makrupları. (2007, ISBN 978-975-08-1305-4)
- Ein von Schatten begrenzter Raum, (novel, 2021, Suhrkamp ISBN 3-518-43008-4)
