= Sarah Schumann =

German painter (1933–2019)

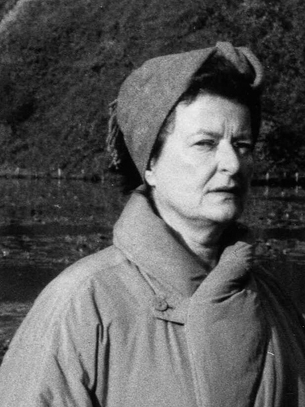
- Born: Maria Schirmer; August 12, 1933; Berlin, Germany
- Died: July 3, 2019 (aged 85); Berlin, Germany
- Movement: Surrealism, Feminism, Post-war Modernism
- Partner: Silvia Bovenschen (1970s–2017)
- Website: https://www.sarah-schumann.org/en/

Sarah Schumann (born Maria Schirmer; August 13, 1933 – July 3, 2019 in Berlin) was a German painter, collagist and draughtswoman. She was heavily involved in the German feminist movement throughout her career, forming the feminist group Brot + Rosen (Bread + Roses) in 1972 and co-curating of Künstlerinnen International 1877–1977, the first exhibition of twentieth-century women's art in Germany.

== Biography ==
Schumann was born as Maria Schirmer to sculptors Dora and Kilian Schirmer in Berlin. As a war refugee of World War II, she grew up in poverty and was malnourished, which led to health problems in her adulthood. She was self-taught in art out of necessity, as her parents could not afford to pay tuition for an art academy, but they nurtured her talent in their studio. Her mother's remarriage to a Nazi Party paramilitary Mann led Schumann to leave home at 15, beginning an apprenticeship in Hamburg. She met gallerist Hans Brockstedt, who took her on his travels to introduce her to the wider arts scene, and she later married him at 18.

During the 1950s, she traveled through Europe with her then-husband Hans Brockstedt, visiting museums and collections, where she exhibited art under the name Maria Brockstedt. After separating from her husband, she lived in London from 1960 to 1963, where she became intimately familiar with the London art scene, and adopted the name Sarah Schumann. In London, she exhibited at the Institute of Contemporary Arts (ICA) where she sold work successfully; in 1963, due to the cost of living, she moved to the Villa Engadina in Piedmont, Italy.

In 1968 she moved back to Berlin. In this time, she worked on three films by director Helke Sander. From 1968 onward, the women's movement became her biggest priority; together with Helke Sander, she founded the group Brot + Rosen (Bread and Roses), and designed the cover of the Frauenhandbuch Nr. 1 (Women's Handbook No. 1) in 1972, which advocated for women's rights to their body and sexual autonomy, championing abortion and the protection of women from the pharmaceutical industry. The first edition of the handbook sold 10,000 copies, and a reprint sold a further 100,000 copies. She also designed numerous covers for the feminist film theory magazine Frauen und Film (Women and Film).

In 1977, she was one of the founders of "Künstlerinnen international 1877–1977" (International Women Artists 1877–1977) in Frankfurt am Main, which was a pioneering exhibition of women's art that highlighted the exclusion and achievements of women in the historically male-dominated art world in post-war Germany. Around 1,000 works by 182 female artists were brought together, was widely considered a trailblazing achievement in feminist historical research, and was the first exhibition on women's art. Harun Farocki documented her working methods in the film A Picture of Sarah Schumann, which was broadcast on WDR in 1978. At the same time, she published her own essays and created her first major portraits of women. She met her partner Silvia Bovenschen through their shared engagement in the women's movement in the 1970s, frequently collaborating through art and was immortalised in literature in Bovenschen's biography Sarah's Law.

In 1977, she was awarded a scholarship to the Villa Massimo in Rome. This was followed by study visits to India and Kenya for the Goethe-Institut in the 1980s. From 1992, she lived in Moscow for three years and worked on her first series, Moscow. Ore + Body, which was exhibited at the A3 Gallery in Moscow in 1994. Further series followed, such as the landscape paintings from the Mark Brandenburg region in the 1990s and Bridges over Green and Blue as well as Berlin: Strolls in a City in the 2000s.

Schumann lived in Charlottenburg, Berlin with her partner until Bovenschen's death in 2019.

== Reception and re-discovery ==
Much of her early work was considered lost, however, many pieces were stored in the attic of her former husband Hans Brockstedt. After a presentation at the Hamburger Kunstverein in 1983, they were moved back into storage. Curator Christoph Keller discovered in Brockstedt's estate; around 60 collages and 15 paintings. They were brought together for a quasi-museum exhibition at the Meyer Riegger Gallery in Berlin, where the works were not for sale. At the same time, Schumann's early informal paintings were presented in 2025 in the exhibition "InformELLE - Women Artists of the 1950s/60s" at the Emil Schumacher Museum Hagen.

== Exhibitions ==
=== Solo exhibitions ===
- 1953: Zimmergalerie Franck, Frankfurt
- 1963: Institute of Contemporary Art, London
- 1965: Haus am Lützowplatz, Berlin
- 1976: Kunstverein München, Munich
- 1978: Frankfurter Kunstverein, Frankfurt
- 1983: Sarah Schumann: Paintings, Collages, Prints; Works from the Years 1958–1982. Kunstverein, Hamburg
- 1990: Journeys to East Germany, Goethe-Institut, Chicago
- 1994: Moscow. Ore and Body, Galerie A 3, Moscow
- 1996: The Lake Pyramid and the Land Pyramid in Branitz, KUNSTstätte Dorothea, Berlin
- 1997: Moscow. Ore and Body, Galerie Samtleben im Nikolaisaal, Potsdam
- 1997: The woods are lovely, dark and deep, but I have promises to keep, and miles to go before I sleep, CALLAS, Worpswede
- 1997: Monument Landscape: the Chalk Cliffs, KUNSTstätte Dorothea, Berlin
- 1998: The Oderbruch–Rügen: the Chalk Cliffs, Parkhaus im Englischen Garten, Berlin (Cultural Office of Tiergarten)
- 1998: I play the streetlife, because there is no place, where I can go ..., KUNSTstätte Dorothea, Berlin
- 1999: Portraits, Die Kommunale Galerie im Leinwandhaus, Frankfurt
- 1999: Public Baths. Bathing Temples. Municipal Baths, KUNSTstätte Dorothea, Berlin
- 2000: Berlin. Bridges over Green and Blue, KUNSTstätte Dorothea, Berlin
- 2000: Portraits, Galerie im Körnerpark, Berlin
- 2000: Moscow. Ore and Body, fabrik., Galerie für gegenwärtige Kunst, Neustrelitz
- 2001: Berlin, Walks in a City, KUNSTstätte Dorothea, Berlin
- 2003: Exhibition accompanying the book Sarah Schumann. Works 1958–2002, KUNSTstätte Dorothea, Berlin
- 2003: Icon. Portrait. Images of the Madonna, Kloster Mariensee, Neustadt am Rübenberge
- 2005: Sarah Schumann. Galerie am Arkonaplatz, Berlin
- 2006: Expedition Heiligengrabe – Dogs and Wolves. Galerie Levy, Hamburg
- 2008: Darß und Vilm. KUNSTstätte Dorothea, Berlin
- 2008: Island Worlds, Annual Meeting of the Vilm Association, Federal Agency for Nature Conservation, Island of Vilm
- 2010: City – Country – Human. E-Plus Gruppe, Berlin
- 2010: Follow me. Literaturforum im Brechthaus, Berlin
- 2011: The Sea – The Morning – The Evening. KUNSTstätte Dorothea, Berlin
- 2013: Sarah Schumann, Gouaches. Galerie am Arkonaplatz, Berlin
- 2013: Sanssouci – The Reflection of an Apparition. Orangerie Neuer Garten, Potsdam
- 2015: As the day turned red, the transformation of Doctor Prokto began. KUNSTstätte Dorothea, Berlin
- 2019: Sarah Schumann. Real World – Collages and Paintings from 1958 to 2008. VAN HAM Art Estate, Cologne
- 2019: Sarah Schumann. The destroyed Japanese embassy and other paintings, collages and drawings, Künstlerhaus Göttingen
- 2021: Sarah Schumann – Drawings and Collages, Marion Grčič-Ziersch, Munich
- 2023: Sarah Schumann. Memorials. Paintings and Drawings from the 1990s, Galerie Susanne Albrecht, Berlin
- 2023/2024: Sarah Schumann – Iconic Woman, The Kunsthalle Trier of the European Art Academy, Trier
- 2025: Collages and Paintings from 1954 to 1982. Sarah Schumann. Meyer Riegger, Berlin

== Works in public collections ==
=== Germany ===
- Stiftung Stadtmuseum Berlin, Berlin
- Berlinische Galerie, Berlin
- Morsbroich Museum, Leverkusen
- Kunstmuseum Wolfsburg, Wolfsburg
- New Berlin Art Association (nbk), Berlin

=== International ===
- Museum of Modern Art (MoMA), New York, US

== Awards ==
- 1977/8: Scholarship for the German Academy, Villa Massimo, Rome
- 1981: Working grant from the Senator for Cultural Affairs, Berlin
- 1986: Scholarship for the Bleckede artists' colony, Lower Saxony
- 1987: Working grant from the Senator for Cultural Affairs, Berlin
- 1990: Working grant from the Art Fund, Bonn

== Publications ==
=== Book publications ===
- Sarah Schumann. With contributions by Silvia Bovenschen. Frölich und Kaufmann, Berlin 1983, ISBN 3-88725-012-5.
- Moscow. Ore and Body. Dvorah-Verlag, Berlin 1995, ISBN 3-927926-20-5.
- Kathrin Mosler (Ed.): Sarah Schumann: Works 1958–2002. Nicolai, Berlin 2003, ISBN 3-87584-969-8.
- Christoph Keller (Ed.): Sarah Schumann. Shock Collages 1957–1964. Spector Books, Leipzig 2025, ISBN 978-3-95905-919-0.

=== Illustrations ===
- Cover design for the collected works edition – Collected Works of Virginia Woolf published by S. Fischer Verlag
- Design of cover motifs for publications, including the complete works of Virginia Woolf published by S. Fischer Verlag, books by Silvia Bovenschen and Alexander Garcia Düttmann.
- Illustrations for an edition of Lewis Carroll's Alice in Wonderland, 1974
- Covers and posters for magazines such as Freedom, Courage and Frauen im Film

=== Filmography ===
- 1978: Harun Farocki: A Picture of Sarah Schumann
- 2000: Renate Sami: Sarah Schumann paints a picture
- 2012: Michaela Melián: Silvia Bovenschen and Sarah Schumann
- 2015: Lone Thau: From Darkness to Light
- 2019: Bettina Böttinger: Sarah Schumann in conversation with Bettina Böttinger, produced by VAN HAM Art Estate
