= Sigrid Damm-Rüger =

German feminist activist

Sigrid Damm-Rüger (born Sigrid Rüger: 1939 - 1995) was a German feminist activist who initially came to prominence in September 1968 through a tomato throwing incident at the 23rd congress of the German Socialist Students' Union, and subsequently became an author specialising in professional education and training.

Several commentators believe that the tomato throwing incident was the event that launched the second wave of the German women's movement.

== Life ==
=== University admission and politicisation ===
Sigrid Rüger was born in Berlin. By 1961 she was working for her Abitur in Frankfurt. Often seen as a school final exam, the Abitur opens the way in Germany to university-level education. Rüger was working for the exam not as a secondary school pupil, but at the newly opened "Hessenkolleg", using the recently introduced alternative education route "Zweiter Bildungsweg", which was designed to open up a route to university admission for older candidates. In or around 1962, after passing her Abitur, Rüger enrolled at the US-backed Free University (FU) in Berlin as a student of Theatre studies. She quickly switched to Politics and Sociology even though, as at least one commentator has pointed out, student radicals identified as the "generation of '68" were scathingly scornful of conventional views of Sociology at this time. She became a member of the German Socialist Student Union ("Sozialistischer Deutscher Studentenbund" / SDS) within which she belonged to the "Universities' Political Working Group" ("Hochschulpolitische Arbeitskreis"). The focus of her student life became university politics at the Free University of Berlin. Here she was elected, in 1964, as a student spokeswoman for the Philosophy Faculty. In 1965 she became a student spokeswoman in the university senate.

=== Student protest movement in the mid-1960s ===
Rüger quickly engaged in the arguments of those times about the nature and extent of the political mandate of the "student body ("Studierendenschaft"), and the "democratization" of the university. During the most "heated" phase of the 1960s student protests at the Free University she became a key figure, confidently relaying student demands against the positions taken by the professor members of the senate. Within the university she thereby quickly became identified as one of the most high-profile student activists in her cohort. During the sit-in of 22 June 1966 it was Rüger who several times was sent by the gathering of several thousand protesting students to deliver their demands to the university senate. The ways in which she reported back to the massed ranks of protestors on the progress of negotiations within the senate were widely seen to have violated hitherto customary principals of confidentiality.

First impressions of the German Socialist Student Union ("Sozialistischer Deutscher Studentenbund" / SDS)

- "I was drawn to the SDS because it discussed topics which otherwise were not discussed at the FU, but which were nevertheless precisely the things that interested me; things like international politics, political structures and inter-relationships, fascism, authoritarian personality structures and university democracy. ... I also joined the student parliament. I was keen to find out what the students could bring to the table, what could be changed .... That was all discussed in the SDS. For me that was all incredibly helpful. So much so that in the beginning I did not once notice the [uneven] power balance [between men and women in the SDS]. I was simply spellbound by the matters discussed. Another aspect was certainly in play, which meant that I did not so readily spot that power imbalance: my friend Susanne [Schunter-Kleemann] was the one who got me into the SDS. She was already in it - she had arrived at Berlin before I did. She took me along to the SDS ... which meant I was already part of a group of women friends, and I rather identified with their feminine solidarity. It frequently happened that the women in the SDS joined because their husbands were members, but I was introduced by another woman who already had women friends there, and they became my women friends too."
- "Der SDS hat mich angezogen, weil er Themen diskutiert hat, die sonst nicht an der Uni diskutiert wurden, die aber genau das trafen, wofür ich mich interessierte, also Internationale Politik, Zusammenhänge, Faschismus, autoritäre Persönlichkeitsstrukturen, Demokratie an der Hochschule. Das war zu der gleichen Zeit, zu der ich in den Konvent, also das Studentenparlament, gegangen bin. Ich interessierte mich dafür, was man als Student einbringen konnte, was zu ändern war … Das alles wurde im SDS diskutiert. Das war für mich unheimlich hilfreich. Insofern habe ich die Machtverhältnisse [zwischen Männern und Frauen innerhalb des SDS] zunächst einmal gar nicht wahrgenommen. Ich war thematisch gebannt. Ein anderer Aspekt hat sicherlich dazu beigetragen, daß ich die Machtverhältnisse nicht so stark wahrgenommen habe, nämlich daß meine Freundin Susanne [Schunter-Kleemann] mich in den SDS geholt hat. Sie war nämlich schon drin, … sie war vor mir in Berlin. Sie hat mich zum SDS mitgenommen … Da war ich also schon in eine Frauenfreundschaft, in eine Frauensolidarität eingebunden und habe mich eher danach ausgerichtet. Häufig war es so, daß Frauen mit ihren Männern in den SDS gegangen sind, ich bin hingegen mit einer Frau dort erschienen, die dort bereits Freundinnen hatte, die wiederum meine Freundinnen wurden."
  Sigrid Damm-Rüger, speaking in 1988 and quoted in 2009

One contemporary witness of those times was the academic Tilman Fichter. Thirty years later Fichter would recall the initial emergence of the student protests movement in 1965. He described the Philosophy Faculty spokeswoman as "one of the best known of the SDS activists" at the FU, back then "almost better known than Rudi Dutschke". (Note: "eine der bekanntesten Aktivistinnen des SDS ... Fast bekannter als Rudi Dutschke.") Volkmar Braunbehrens (who subsequently achieved notability as a musicologist and leading Mozart specialist) was selected by Rüger to take over her role as Philosophy Faculty spokesperson in 1966: Braunbehrens recalled much later that [among the students] in 1960s Berlin, Sigrid Rüger became "someone of absolute authority". (Note: eine ..."absolute Autoritätsperson".)

The amount of time and energy Rüger devoted to her multiple roles in student politics during this period led to her officially taking time out from her elected post as student representative. Sources are silent over whether she ever completed her degree course. However, she continued to engage prominently in the political debates at the FU.

=== The tomato throwing incident and the "new" women's movement ===
In January 1968 the women's group Action Council on Women's Liberation ("Aktionsrat zur Befreiung der Frauen") was founded by a group of women SDS members. Action Council members remained, at least initially, closely involved as members of the SDS, but they also called for a "feminist debate" to focus on the exploitative aspects of women's relationships. Although the debate was seen as important in its own terms, backers were also hoping for an opportunity to find practical solutions to the childcare challenges facing new mothers keen to be able to continue their university studies. A report in Der Spiegel the previous year had stated that in West Germany at this time there was only one nursery place for every 23 children of working mothers: the same ratio also applied to students with children. Rüger herself was not among the leading activists involved with the Action Council at this stage, but her leadership role within the SDS meant that she was well aware that among the SDS leaders there was a singular absence of empathy with feminist viewpoints.

As part of their promotional activities a small group of women from the Action Council met up on one side of the room at the twenty-third delegates' conference of the SDS at Frankfurt on 13 September 1968. One of them, young and beautiful, with striking red hair, wearing a green skirt, and by this time very heavily pregnant was Sigrid Rüger. At this point Rüger was affected by a powerful dietary craving: she had a large box filled with tomatoes on the table in front of her. That was the context for the widely publicised tomato throwing incident whereby Sigrid Rüger expressed displeasure over the lack of consideration given to women's issues in the discussions and activities of her fellow SDS leaders when airing their ambitions to change West German society.

Rüger threw several (according to one source, three) tomatoes in the direction of the row of male SDS conference organisers, uttering an exclamation as she did it. One of them hit Hans-Jürgen Krahl, a rising star of the SDS leadership who was deep in gossip/conversation. (Note: Hans-Jürgen Krahl (1943 - 1970) died young, following a car accident less than two years later.) It later turned out that she had been aiming not at Krahl, who was gay and the complete opposite of a misogynist, but at the face of Helmut Schauer the SDS president at the time. "That evening Krahl sat in the bath and cried", recalled a mutual friend, Tilman Fichter; "Then Sigrid came round to comfort him. That's how she was." (Note: "Der Krahl lag abends in der Badewanne und weinte ... Da kam die Sigrid und tröstete ihn. So war sie".)

Thrown vegetables or eggs were a much loved protest device for protesting students during this period. Preferred targets in West Germany were politicians and other establishment figures perceived by the throwers as more than averagely reactionary. The attention grabbing difference on this occasion was that the thrown tomatoes came from a group of SDS women: their target was the (male) leadership circle of their own student socialist organisation.

An immediate practical result of the tomato throwing was that it prevented the men who were running the conference from letting a powerful speech from Helke Sander, in which Sander appealed for the SDS to support the women's political agenda, to be followed by the next agenda item without any discussion. Rüger later recalled that even before the conference opened, Helke Sander's acceptance as an Action Council delegate to it had been pushed through only in the face of stiff opposition from a group of Berlin SDS men. In her speech Sander addressed the problems encountered both within the SDS, and in West German society more generally. She proposed a strategy involving an alliance between the SDS and the Action Council. That never happened. Instead, the twenty-third SDS conference with its tomato throwing incident was followed by a slow drifting apart of the Action Council from the SDS. Many women in the Action Council pressed for an organisation structure that became increasingly autonomous, un encumbered by links to any organisation where power and influence were shared between both women and men.

Two of West Germany's most powerful weekly news magazines, Der Spiegel and Stern reported Sander's speech and Rüger's tomato throwing in some detail. Of the two publications Stern during the 1960s was frequently more ready to publish criticism of the conservative elements in the West German political establishment than Spiegel: it was Stern that now devoted its own lengthy article to the "Protest of the SDS Women". Rüger's own assessment was quoted by Manfred Bissinger in the Stern article: "I threw the tomatoes to make the girls articulate their problems with emotional courage and aggressions". (Note: "Ich habe die Tomaten geworfen, um den Mädchen Mut zu emoti[o]naler und aggressiver Artikulierung ihrer Probleme zu machen.")

Sigrid Rüger herself was never happy with the way that her action of throwing a few tomatoes was quickly elevated into a cult event. She said that she favoured "demystification" under almost all circumstances.

- "... I think it is bad to "mystify" any event, individual or movement. Mystification comes with the risk that people will end up thinking that a great big one-off event, by creating an impact, leaves nothing else for concerned individuals to do, and / or that the masses no longer need to do anything else. while others simply draw delight from the creation of a pleasing new myth. ... The new women's movement was overdue [in 1968] and the tomatoes were over-ripe."
- "... ich glaube daß es schlecht ist, ein Ereignis, Personen oder eine ganze Bewegung zu mystifizieren. Das kann dazu führen, daß viele denken, der große einmalige Wurf bringt es, und man selber braucht nichts dazu zu tun, oder die Masse braucht nichts zu tun, und die anderen sind froh, daß es die Mystifizierung gibt. ... Die neue Frauenbewegung war überfällig und die Tomaten waren überreif"
  Sigrid Damm-Rüger, speaking in 1988 and quoted in 2009

The incident acted as a highly effective rallying call for West Germany's "new" women's movement. Its impact on feminist consciousness was unmatched for nearly three years, until the "We've had abortions!" headline appeared on the cover of Stern in June 1971. West German society had remained strikingly risk-averse since the 1945, however: several commentators contend that it was only the 1971 Stern headline that finally dragged the country's "new" feminism beyond the confines of the university campuses. Within the student movement and across the universities sector, the tomato throwing incident galvanised awareness of the demands of the Action Council among both backers and opponents. In several university cities so-called "Women's Soviets" ("Weiberräte") were established. These took steps to draw public attention to the social disadvantages that women faced, employing sometimes spectacular tactics.

=== After '68 ===
As her tomato throwing quickly became a lasting symbol for the confident and autonomous feminist movement which emerged rapidly in West Germany during the ensuing ten years, Sigrid Rüger herself withdrew into the political background. She took a job with the West Berlin-based Federal (i.e. 'national') Institute for Professional Education and Training ("Bundesinstitut für Berufsbildung"), where she worked for many years, and for which, during her final years, the focus of her work was on "social qualifications" and "social competences". She became the author and / or producer of a succession of articles and monographs on vocational education and professional development, with a particular emphasis on these topics as they relate to women. While employed at the Federal Institute she also established herself as a personal counsellor and worked as an honorary (i.e. unpaid) official of the Public Services and Transport Trades Union ("Gewerkschaft Öffentliche Dienste, Transport und Verkehr" / ÖTV).

== Personal ==
Sigrid Damm-Rüger was married to Uwe Damm. They had met at university as members of the SDS political working group. Dorothee, the elder of her two daughters was born two weeks after the famous tomato throwing incident.

Sigrid Damm-Rüger died from cancer in Berlin just five years after reunification. She was 57. Dorothee Damm, her daughter, subsequently admitted that it was "only on the day of her [mother's] burial" that the daughter understood just how important her mother's action had been in launching the "new" women's movement. Friends and political comrades from 1968 crowned the ceremony by laying a wreath on the grave that principally featured tomatoes.
