= Helke Sander =

German film director and writer (born 1937)

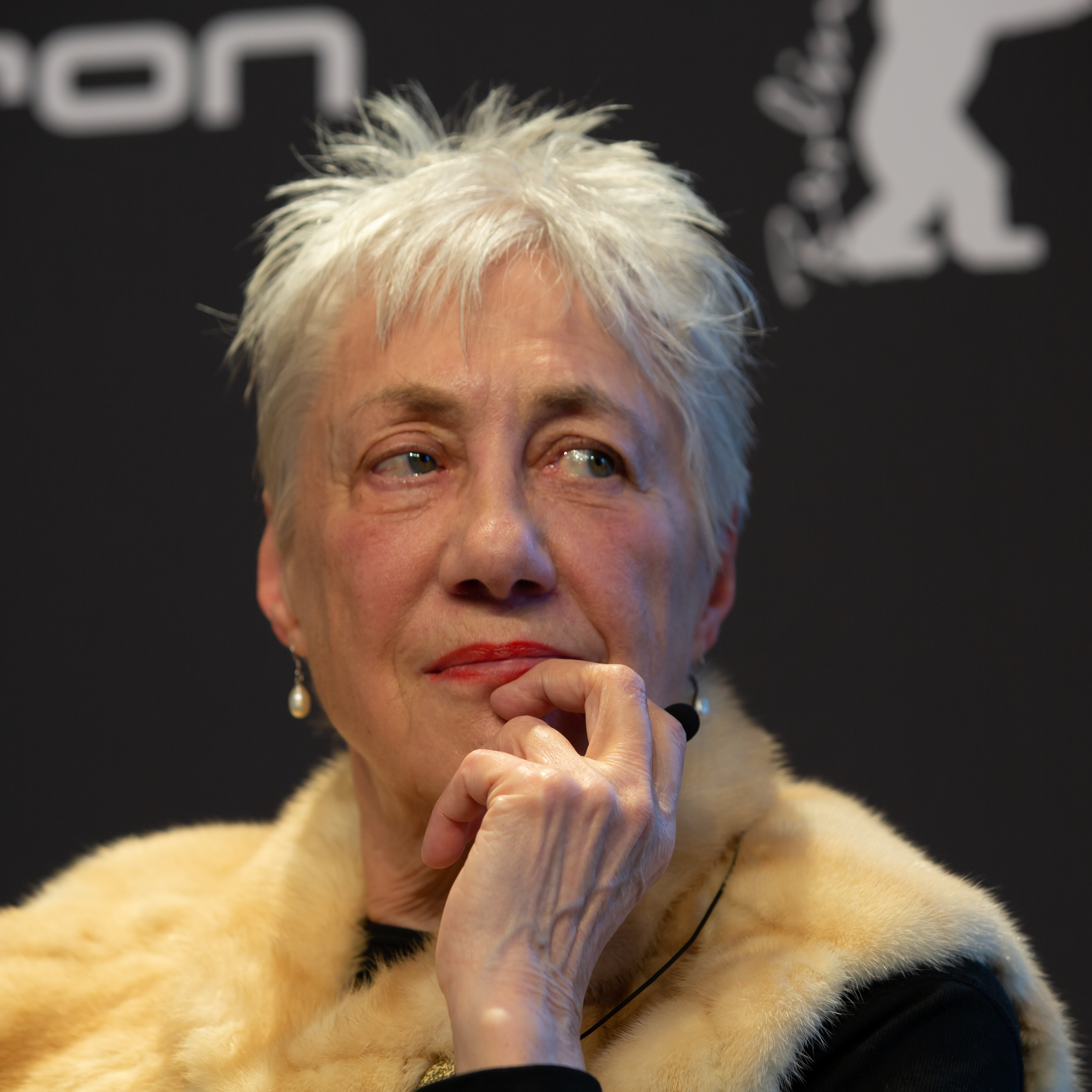
Helke Sander

Helke Sander (born January 31, 1937, in Berlin) is a German feminist film director, author, actor, activist, and educator. She is known primarily for her documentary work and contributions to the women's movement in the seventies and eighties.

Sander's work is characterized by her emphasis of the experimental over the narrative arc. Sander is considered to have started the "new" feminist movement in Germany with her passionate speech at the Socialist German Students Conference. A lot of Sander's work is about portraying female perspectives and showing the everyday struggles that women go through to survive.

In her essay Feminists and Film (1977), Sander states the motivation for her work: "To put it in other terms: women's most authentic act today—in all areas including the arts—consists not in standardizing and harmonizing the means, but rather in destroying them. Where women are true, they break things." Sander's work is concerned with the breakage of conventional ideas and forms. "

== Early life and education ==
Born in Berlin, Sander was living in Dresden during the firestorm bombing of Dresden during WWII. By the time she graduated from high school, she had been to 15 schools around Germany. She received her Abitur in Remscheid in 1957 and went on to study acting at the Ida Ehre School in Hamburg.

In 1959, Sander married Finnish writer Markku Lahtela in 1959, and had a son, Silvio Lahtela. After the birth of Silvio, Sander and her family moved to Helsinki where she studied Germanistics and psychology at the University of Helsinki. Sander also directed and performed in Ernst Toller's play "Der deutsche Hinkemann and Grass' "Noch zehn Minuten bis Buffalo." On the side, she also taught classes on drama and improvisation. From 1966 to 1969, she studied at the newly founded film school 'Deutsche Film und Fernsehakademie'. Sander's work in cinema is very closely linked to her political engagement as a feminist.

In 1965 Sander returned to the BRD where she worked at the German Film and Television Academy as a reporter and translator struggling to support herself and her son. She found it frustrating that a woman who works as much as she did still struggled to survive and became active in the Socialist German Student Organization (SDS). Here she would go on to find the "Aktionsrat zur Befreiung der Frauen" (Action Council for the Liberation of Women) in January 1968, which started the movement for Kinderläden which converted shops into childcare centers.

== Career and activism ==
Sander decided to continue her education at the Deutsche Film- und Fernsehakademie in Berlin (Berlin Film and Television Academy) where she would go on to become one of the institutions first ever graduates. Sander became very active in the Students' movement during this time and started the "Aktionsrat zur Befreiung der Frau" (Action Council for the Liberation of Women) in 1968.

In 1968, she gave a powerful speech at the SDS (Socialist German Students) conference in Frankfurt where she stressed how women are only truly accepted in society when they "adapt." She asked for the SDS to support the women's political agenda. When her male colleagues tried to ignore this plea and to return to business as usual, Sigrid Rüger hurled her famous tomato, and the second wave of the German women's movement was born.

In 1971, Helke Sander organized the women's group 'Brot und Rosen'. The platform centered on the idea that birth control was not safe for women.

In 1972, Helke Sander continued work on her birth control project. Her film Macht die Pille frei? (Does the Pill Liberate Women?) who she produced with Sarah Schumann, was a campaign against anti-abortion laws. Together with Claudia von Aleman, she organized the feminist film conference 'Erste internationale Frauenfilmseminar' which took place in 1973 in Berlin. This was the first ever European feminist film festival. The festival premiered 40 different European female filmmakers. In 1974, she founded Frauen und Film (journal), the first feminist European film journal, where she was chief editor and author until 1982. Frauen und film was the only feminist film journal in Europe at the time and was a hub for analyzing and critiquing sexism in film as well as a forum to discuss female films.

Her first full-length film Die allseitig reduzierte Persönlichkeit – REDUPERS (The All-Around Reduced Personality) is among the most important German feminist films of the 1970s. The film blends techniques of both documentary and fictional film. The story follows a gifted woman artist in Berlin who faces demands from all aspects of society, emphasizing the struggles women face professionally, financially, politically, and personally. This film helped create "a new filmic language" in which her experimental style and use of filters began to take over this new wave of filmmaking. [7] [8]

Sander's critical eye towards postwar German culture was expanded in her 1984 satire on sexual politics, "Der Beginn aller Schrecken ist Liebe" (Love is the Beginning of All Terror) in which she stars. The story is about a man who comes between two women that present a female perspective full of wit and irony.

In 1985, through an election process, Helke Sander joined the West Berlin Academy of Arts. Sander would later file a resignation from the Academy citing "misogyny, nepotism, and corruption".[3]

In 1989 Sander, Margarethe von Trotta, Christel Buschmann and Helma Sanders-Brahms produced Felix.

Bericht aus Bonn (The Germans and their Men – Report from Bonn) was a docu-fiction film produced in 1989 in which Sander investigates the impact of feminist thought after twenty years of women's activism; male parliamentarians, ministerial officials, the federal Chancellor and the man in the street are all interrogated.[9]

Starting in 1981 Sander was a professor at the Hochschule für bildende Künste, an Academy of Fine Arts, in Hamburg. She left the institution in 2001.[3] Helke Sander was honored by the Arsenal Institute for Film and Video Art in Berlin in 2003. A retrospective of her collected works in film was shown in their Arsenal Cinema.[3]

Sander is also an author and publicist for Die Geschichten der drei Damen K (The Three Women K) where stories about irony within heterosexual relationships are told from a female perspective.

In 2005 Sander made Mitten im Malestream (In the Midst of the Malestream) in which she reviews and investigates the second wave of German feminism that she helped kickstart back in 1968. This film explores the central conflicts and questions that seem to be left unanswered. Sander's entire career of activism can be summarized throughout this film, but it also offers more than just a summary and pushes the boundaries of experimental film.

== Filters and films ==
Helke Sander's work is characterized by the use of filters, which function as a visual cue to remind the audience of the subjectivity presented. The use of the filter draws attention to the properties of a documentary and the ideology being communicated, allowing the audience an awareness of the rhetoric being delivered. Sander's use of filters ushered in a new wave of experimental filmmaking, where the visual style of the film became equally as important as the subject itself.

=== Redupers: The All-Round Reduced Personality (1977) ===
Redupers is a documentary about the Berlin Wall, the border between East and West Berlin, and the central character's relationship to Berlin . Through authorial inscription, Helke Sander portrays the central character of the film, a woman who must come to terms with the political and private sphere of being a woman against the backdrop of unrest. Sander also focuses on photographer Edda Chiemnyjewski's efforts. Feminist interpretations Redupers posit that the Berlin Wall functions not only as a representation of the divide geographically, but also as a stand-in for the psychic and sexual differences between men and women.

=== The Subjective Factor (1980) ===
The Subjective Factor chronicles the origins of the women's movement and the Berlin student movement, set against the backdrop of a commune, and deals with issues of anarchism, terrorism, and phallocentrism. Sander's portrayal shows Leftist males run the commune while women are relegated to domestic duties and are denied rights to speak out.

The film is set during the late sixties and consists of a combination of fictional footage and newsreel footage. The use of filter in the film draws attention to the properties of the documentary itself, the views that are presented. Sander's use of the female voice over in The Subjective Factor was a marker of progressive film making at the time.

=== Liberators Take Liberties: War, Rapes, Children (1992) ===
Her 1992 documentary film, BeFreier und Befreite (Liberators Take Liberties), examines the mass rape of German women committed by soldiers of the Red Army at the end of World War II. Sander's film was particularly controversial because there were concerns that the film placed too much emphasis on German suffering, thereby lessening guilt for the Holocaust. Defenders of the film argue that Sander's project is a complex reflection on rape as a weapon of war. They argue that the film resists presenting a one-sided depiction of German victimization citing the film's attention to German war crimes and self-reflexive qualities.

This documentary won the Nestor Almendros Prize in the 1993 Human Rights Festival. The film situated Sander as a researcher historian contributing to history, because Sander uncovered and catalogued events previously unvisited.

This documentary uses an arrangement of interviews to create an overall thematic message. Questions have been raised regarding Sander's use of filters in this documentary, especially as it relates to the portrayal of ethnic qualities, which were overemphasized within the interviews.

== Filmography ==
Director (30 titles)

- 2005: Mitten im Malestream [In Midst of the Malestream] (documentary)
  - This documentary is a history of the second wave of the German women's movement. Sander examines abortion rights, the birth strike, and the politics of motherhood.
- 2001: Village (TV documentary)
- 1998: Muttertier – Muttermensch [Animal Mother – Human Mother] (TV documentary)
  - This documentary chronicled and examined the maternal role of women.
- 1997: Dazlak
- 1992: BeFreier und Befreite (documentary)
- 1992: Krieg und sexuelle Gewalt [War and Sexual Violence] (documentary)
  - This documentary was a report on refugee camps in Hungary and Austria following the Serbian and Bosnian War.
- 1989: Die Deutschen und ihre Männer – Bericht aus Bonn [The Germans and their Men – Report from Bonn] (TV documentary)
  - Examines the impact of post-women's activism and feminist thought on the male German public. Men from several social classes are interviewed.
- 1989: Die Meisen von Frau S. (documentary short)
- 1988: Felix (segment "Muss ich aufpassen?")
- 1987: Nr. 5 – Aus Berichten der Wach- und Patrouillendienste (short)
- 1986: Nr. 8 – Aus Berichten der Wach- und Patrouillendienste (short)
- 1986: Seven Women, Seven Sins (segment "Völlerei? Füttern!")
- 1985: Nr. 1 – Aus Berichten der Wach- und Patrouillendienste (short)
- 1984: Der Beginn aller Schrecken ist Liebe [Love Is the Beginning of All Terror]
  - Helke Sander takes the main role in this satire. The film revolves around the plot of a man between two women.
- 1983: Die Gedächtnislücke – Filmminiaturen über den alltäglichen Umgang mit Giften (documentary)
- 1981: Der subjektive Faktor [The Subjective Factor]
- 1981: Wie geht das Kamel durchs Nadelöhr? (documentary)
- 1978: The All-Around Reduced Personality – Outtakes (Die allseitig reduzierte Persönlichkeit – Redupers)
- 1973: Männerbünde (TV documentary)
- 1973: Macht die Pille frei? (TV documentary)
- 1971: Eine Prämie für Irene [A Reward for Irene] (TV film)
  - Examined the double exploitation of women; their lives in family and in the factory.
- 1970: Kinder sind keine Rinder [Children are Not Cattle] (documentary short)
  - Documented the treatment of children in a childcare center.
- 1969: Das schwache Geschlecht muss stärker werden – Weibergeschichten (TV film)
- 1968: Die rote Fahne (documentary short)
- 1967/68: Brecht die Macht der Manipulateure! (documentary film)
  - Campaign of the student movement against Springer, a German media group. Made for Finnish television.
- 1967: Silvo (documentary short)
- 1967: Subjektitüde (short)
- 1965: Naurukierukka (TV film)
- 1965: Skorpioni (TV film)
- 1965: Teatterituokio (TV series)

== Awards and nominations ==
1985– Sander wins the Golden Bear award for best short film with her short "Nr. 1 – Aus Berichten der Wach- und Patrouillendienste" at the Berlin International Film Festival. Helke Sander was honored by the Arsenal Institute for Film and Video Art (Berlin) in 2003. A retrospective of her collected works in film was shown in their Arsenal Cinema.

== Writings ==
- Die Geschichten der drei Damen K., München : Frauenbuchverlag, ISBN 3-88897-123-3
- Oh Lucy : Erzählung, 2. Aufl., München : Kunstmann, 1991, ISBN 3-88897-044-X

== See also ==
- Women's Cinema
