= Frauen und Film =

Frauen und Film (Women and Film) is a German feminist film journal.

== History ==
Frauen und Film was founded in Berlin in 1974 by filmmaker Helke Sander. Since 1983 it has been based in Frankfurt.
