= Sozialistischer Deutscher Studentenbund =

German student organization

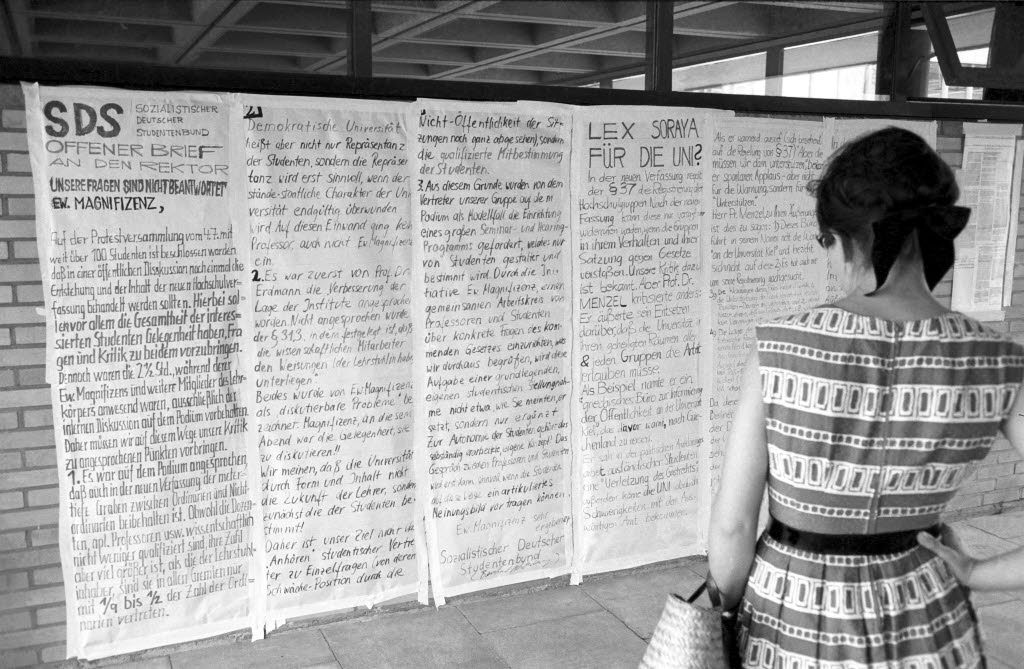
- A woman reads an open letter from the SDS to the rector of Kiel University, 1967
- Location: West Germany
- Established: 1946
- Abolished: 1970
- Members: 2,500 (1968)
- Affiliations: SPD (1946-61)
- Part of: Außerparlamentarische Opposition

The Sozialistischer Deutscher Studentenbund (SDS; transl. Socialist German Students' Union; or Socialist German Students' League) was founded in 1946 in Hamburg, Germany, as the collegiate branch of the Social Democratic Party of Germany (SPD). In the 1950s, tensions between the SDS and the main party surfaced, particularly over the party's support of West Germany's rearming, until the SPD expelled all members of the SDS from the party in 1961.

== History ==
After its exclusion from the parent organization SPD, the SDS became the leading element in the Außerparlamentarische Opposition (APO; English: Extraparliamentary Opposition). In late 1966, it became active when the SPD and Christian Democratic Union formed a grand coalition, which left Germany without a strong opposition inside parliament, since members of those two parties represented more than 90% of the seats in the Bundestag. The group consisted mainly of college and university students. The SDS opposed the Vietnam War and Germany's political involvement in it, as well as the use of nuclear weapons; and objected to the fact that many former National Socialists (or Nazis) still held influential positions in West Germany. They also wanted to advance democratic structures in all institutions, for example in schools.

In May and June 1967, the Shah Mohammad Reza Pahlavi visited West Germany. On June 2, 1967 in West Berlin, Iranian and German students (including the SDS and Confederation of Iranian Students) protested the Shah's visit, and it resulted in one student being killed.

Alternative lifestyles and more tolerance for same-sex couples, a more open treatment of sexual topics, the right to abortion and equal rights for women are also associated with the APO, and the SDS as its best known representative. The students involved used the same methods of protest as the anti-war movement in the United States at that time, for example sit-ins and demonstrations. The student movement reached its height in 1968 (its membership peaked at 2,500 at that time); after that the influence of the SDS declined. In 1970 it disbanded. A resurrection of the SDS in 1988 proved of no importance.

Important members of the SDS were Helmut Schmidt, later Chancellor of West Germany (he was a member while the SDS was still part of the SPD), the later Red Army Faction member Ulrike Meinhof, and a 1968 student movement leader Rudi Dutschke.

In 2007, the student organization of the Left Party, adopted the name Die Linke.SDS (Sozialistisch-Demokratischer Studierendenverband) at its founding congress.

== Members ==
A number of people who would later hold important positions in German society and politics were members of the SDS:

- Rudi Dutschke, left-wing activist and student movement leader
- Otto Fichtner, politician (SPD) (SDS chairman 1955–1956)
- Joschka Fischer, former foreign minister (Alliance 90/The Greens)
- Hajo Funke, political scientist
- Dieter Kunzelmann, left-wing activist
- Ulrike Meinhof, founding member of Red Army Fraction
- Bernd Rabehl, left-wing activist
- Helmut Schmidt, former chancellor (SPD) (SDS chairman 1947–1948)
- Fritz Teufel, political activist

== See also ==
- German Student Union (1919–1945)
