= Monika Berberich =

West German terrorist

Monika Berberich is a convicted West German terrorist and a founding member of the Red Army Faction (RAF). She was involved in the violent freeing of Andreas Baader in 1970, and served a prison sentence between 1970 and 1988 in connection with it.

Unlike some other former RAF members, she has never attempted to distance herself from the terrorist organisation's goals and methods.

== Life ==
Monika Berberich was born and grew up in Oberursel, a small town on the northern fringes of Frankfurt. Her upbringing was powerfully catholic. She studied jurisprudence at Frankfurt and the Free University of Berlin, emerging with a law degree. Her first serious brush with the law came in 1965 when she spent four months in a Prague prison for the crime of helping political refugees attempting to escape from Czechoslovakia.

At some stage she passed her level I national law exams, but she never progressed to level II. In 1970 she found an administrative job in the lawyer's office run by Horst Mahler, at that time the ideological head of the newly formed Red Army Faction (RAF). She soon joined up and undertook administrative work on behalf of the terrorist group: Berberich rented houses and apartments for use in RAF operations. With others she was involved in preparations for the release from prison of Andreas Baader which took place on 14 May 1970. The plot succeeded in that Andreas Baader was indeed freed from the Research Institute for Social Questions in Berlin-Dahlem where he had been sent on a rehabilitation-secondment from prison. The plan failed, however, to the extent that in the confusion involved in freeing Baader, Georg Linke, a 62 year old institute librarian, was shot by the accomplice and his liver badly injured. (Linke would survive the injury.) Unbeknown to the research institute, Baader had an accomplice working "on the inside" in the form of the radical journalist Ulrike Meinhof: she had been expected by the group to remain at the institute following Baader's "liberation", and then provide media reports supportive of her escaped RAF comrades. After the near-fatal shooting Meinhof seems to have had a sudden change of plan, and she herself escaped by leaping through a window and joining the others in the getaway car. She now "disappeared underground". Directly after Meinhof's disappearance it was Monika Berberich who collected her friend's seven year old twin daughters from the zoo (a meeting point pre-arranged with the comrade who had collected the girls from the Bremen apartment where they had been sent before the operation to free Baader reached it denouement), and drove with the children through France and Italy to the "barracks camp" on the side of Mount Etna which had originally been constructed as emergency accommodation for people made homeless by a volcanic eruption, and where now Andreas Baader and other comrades were hiding. (Note: It later turned out that Meinhof's children were taken to Andreas Baader's Sicilian hide-out not, as they had been led to believe, to be reunited with their mother - who remained in West Berlin living underground - but to keep them out of the hands of their father, who had been granted custody of them by a West German court as soon as Ulrike Meinhof's face had started appearing on wanted posters. In September 1970 they were located by a Hamburg journalist and returned to West Germany in time to spend their eighth birthday there. By now they were living with their father.)

The stay in Sicily was brief. Berberich and others involved in Baader's escape moved on to Jordan. They spent most of the summer of 1970 undergoing quasi-military training at a PLO-Fatah camp along the Jordan-Syria border. In September the group returned to West Germany and began stockpiling weapons. Berberich continued to support the "logistical expansion" of the RAF. For those involved the group's political objectives were both idealistic and necessary, and that provided ample justification for illegality. They idealised their criminal actions because they thought there was no other way to "wake people up". Even among the most effective of radical left-wing journalists, there were those who believed that simply writing about the issues could no longer change anything. But for the RAF there was still a necessity somehow to fund their activities: Berberich was involved in several bank raids.

On 8 October 1970 Berberich went to visit some friends at Knesebeckstraße 89 in West Berlin. The police were arresting her comrades when she arrived. She later recalled that the police did not have her "on their list. They were really surprised when I came in". They nevertheless arrested Berberich, together with Horst Mahler, Irene Goergens, Ingrid Schubert and Brigitte Asdonk. With the exception of Asdonk, the police determined that all those arrested were carrying loaded weapons. The court subsequently convicted her because it determined that she had been involved in a bank raid, and had rented a couple of cars and an apartment [for use in connection with terrorism], while wearing a crookedly fixed wig. She was found guilty of "supporting a criminal association" ("Unterstützung einer kriminellen Vereinigung") and taking part in the freeing of Andreas Baader. She received (initially) a twelve-year prison sentence. This, reportedly, was two years longer than her female co-defendants because of her intelligence and legal training which persuaded the court that she was particularly dangerous.

On 4 July 1976 Berberich, together with Gabriele Rollnik, Juliane Plambeck and Inge Viett, managed to escape through a window in the prison library from the women's prison along the Lehrter Straße in West Berlin where they were being held at the time. Berberich's three fellow-escapees were members of the 2 June Movement. To an outsider, the RAF and the 2 June Movement were broadly similar both in their ideals and in their methods, but at this stage they were still separate and on occasion saw one another as rival organisations. Nevertheless, it is clear that during her time in prison Berberich had already formed an excellent mutually supportive friendship with Rollnik. In a trial that took place four years later it was stated that by the time the four women had made it across the roofs to their get-away car, they had overpowered their guards: implements used in the escape had included the tube from a roll of toilet tissues, three bed springs tied together and a firearm or firearm replica. Berberich was recaptured two weeks later. She was making her way along the Kurfürstendamm in West Berlin to a meeting when she unexpectedly met her brother and the two stopped to chat. Berberich was large, with a strikingly unusual face: as she chatted with her brother she was spotted and recognised by a passer-by who alerted the police. Arrest followed swiftly. (Berberich's three fellow-escapees remained at large for another two years.)

Following her brief escape Berberich's sentence was extended. In the end she remained in prison till March 1988. Except during the two years 1976-1978, she shared the experience with Rollnik, in many ways a political soul-mate, who also became a friend. During their time in prison the women took part in a number hunger strikes. The objective was to secure improved treatment and conditions. Examples included use of a cell with a window, longer exercise periods in the yard and, more generally, anything "anti-state". From experience the inmates found that up to a point hunger strikes worked. Berberich engaged in nine hunger strikes: Rollnik in six. In the end, Rollnik began to hallucinate and "hear voices". After her release she suffered continuing problems with vision and balance which she attributed to the hunger strikes. Berberich's physique seemed to deal with hunger strikes better than Rollnik's, though after her release it became clear that even she could no longer take her former robust health for granted.

After her release Berberich remained resolute in her determination to shun conventional social norms. "I never wanted a normal life and I still don't today". (Note: "Ich wollte nie ein normales Leben und will das auch heute nicht.") Her first job post release was as a cycle courier. Then she was diagnosed with an abscess on the cerebellum. The condition involved ten days in a coma followed by several months in a wheel chair. Even after that her movements remained awkward and her speech affected. She never recovered complete balance and the finer motor skills. She was no longer able to hold down a full-time job, but continued to work at the "Dritte-Welt-Haus" (literally, "Third World House") charity association in Frankfurt. She sings in a choir and takes care of a friend's children.

Berberich has never distanced herself from the objectives and methods of the RAF. In 1995 she gave an interview to the BBC in which she characterised contemporary Germany as a "fascist state".
