= Astrid Proll =

Early member of the Baader-Meinhof Gang

- Born: Astrid Huberta Isolde Marie Luise Hildegard Proll; 29 May 1947 (age 79); Kassel, Germany
- Other name: Anna Puttick
- Organization: Red Army Faction

Astrid Huberta Isolde Marie Luise Hildegard Proll (born 29 May 1947) is a German woman who was an early member of the Red Army Faction (Baader-Meinhof Gang). She is a photo editor and author.

== As a Baader-Meinhof member ==
Proll was the younger sister of Thorwald Proll. They were children of an architect. They met Andreas Baader and Gudrun Ensslin through him; Thorwald left the group relatively early in its history, after being involved in firebombings in Frankfurt in 1968.

Proll was involved in bank robbery. She was the getaway driver for Andreas Baader when he escaped from police custody with the help of Gudrun Ensslin, Ulrike Meinhof, Ingrid Schubert, Irene Goergens in 1970.

Proll, along with Manfred Grashof, was stopped by police on 10 February 1971 but managed to get away. However, in Hamburg on 6 May of the same year, she was finally arrested after a pump attendant at a petrol station recognised her from a wanted poster and alerted the police. She attempted to flee but was surrounded by armed officers and arrested. Once she was detained, her run-in with the police in February was turned into an attempted murder charge even though she never even fired a shot. She was imprisoned but released on health grounds (being kept in complete acoustic isolation in prison caused her health to deteriorate) and transferred to a sanatorium.

== On the run ==
While at the sanatorium, Proll was required to report to the police, but she soon escaped and went underground. Given contact details of people in London she decided to go to England, arriving there at the age of 26. In London, a marriage to Robin Puttick allowed her to obtain new identity documents as Anna Puttick. With these she obtained a variety of jobs. She worked for six months as a park-keeper for Hackney Council, and for a year in Lesney's toy factory. From there she took a Hackney Council-sponsored welding course in car mechanics, using her skills to train young people as part of a drug-rehabilitation initiative. During this time, she tried to maintain a low profile, although there was speculation that to distance herself from the Red Army Faction she had joined her local Liberal Party.

On 15 September 1978 Proll was discovered and arrested by the Special Branch of the police after approaching the authorities with an enquiry. She was detained and fought extradition; the case attracted both supporters and opposition. Supporters suggested that the fact that she was teaching under-privileged children mechanics in a workshop in West Hampstead was a token of her political repentance and good faith. Critics suggested that as Proll was a lesbian the marriage to Puttick could only be a "marriage of convenience". She herself decided to return to West Germany in 1979 to fight her case there.

== Return to Germany ==
Back in Germany, Proll's attempted murder charge was dropped when it was gathered that the state had withheld information that could have cleared her but she was still sentenced to five and a half years imprisonment on account of bank robbery and falsifying documents; however, she had already spent at least two-thirds of that time in German and English prisons and therefore was released immediately. She did not rejoin the Baader-Meinhof Gang. Proll went on to study film and photography at the Hochschule für bildende Künste Hamburg and later became a picture editor for magazine and newspaper. She was the first to assign Martin Parr and Wolfgang Tillmans magazine work for the German market.

Proll participated in interviews about her time in the Baader-Meinhof Gang and has published a photography-based book about the gang entitled Pictures on the Run. She has worked, as recently as 1999, as a picture editor in the United Kingdom.

During a radio chat show, when asked if she was "terribly ashamed" of being associated with the RAF, Proll said she was not, but went on to say that she did disapprove of their increasingly violent acts. Interviewed by Iain Sinclair for his book Hackney, That Rose-Red Empire, she said that she would like to settle in Britain but did not have the money to do so.

== See also ==
- Members of the Red Army Faction

== Bibliography ==
- Hans und Grete, die RAF 67–77. Steidl, Göttingen 1998, ISBN 978-3-88243-562-7. An updated and expanded new edition Hans und Grete. Bilder der RAF 1967–1977. Aufbau-Verlag, Berlin 2004, ISBN 3-351-02597-1.
- Baader Meinhof: pictures on the run 67-77. Scalo, Zürich 1998, ISBN 978-3-931141-84-4
- Goodbye to London: Radical Art and Politics in the 70’s (Catalog to the exhibition of the same title 2010-06-26 – 2010-08-15 at Neue Gesellschaft für Bildende Kunst in Berlin). Hatje Cantz Verlag, Ostfildern 2010. ISBN 978-3-775727-39-6
- Zwischen Sturm und Stille: Wie ich der RAF entkam (with Boris von Brauchitsch), Matthes & Seitz Berlin, 2026 ISBN 978-3-751821-40-7
