= Harry Dahl =

Harry Dahl may refer to:

- Harry Dahl (footballer)] (1902–1986), Swedish footballer
- Harry Dahl (homeland security), East German police officer who switched to homeland security in 1956
