= Brigitte Asdonk =

German political activist (1947–2025)

- Born: 25 October 1947; Kamp-Lintfort, North Rhine-Westphalia, Germany
- Died: 15 September 2025 (aged 77)
- Education: Free University of Berlin (Lic.)
- Occupation: Political activist

Brigitte Asdonk (25 October 1947 – 15 September 2025) was a German left-wing political activist.

Asdonk was a co-founder of the Red Army Faction and was arrested on 8 October 1970 alongside Horst Mahler, Ingrid Schubert, Irene Goergens, and Monika Berberich and sentenced to twelve years in prison for bank robbery.

Asdonk died on 15 September 2025, at the age of 77.
