= Horst Mahler =

German political activist (1936–2025)

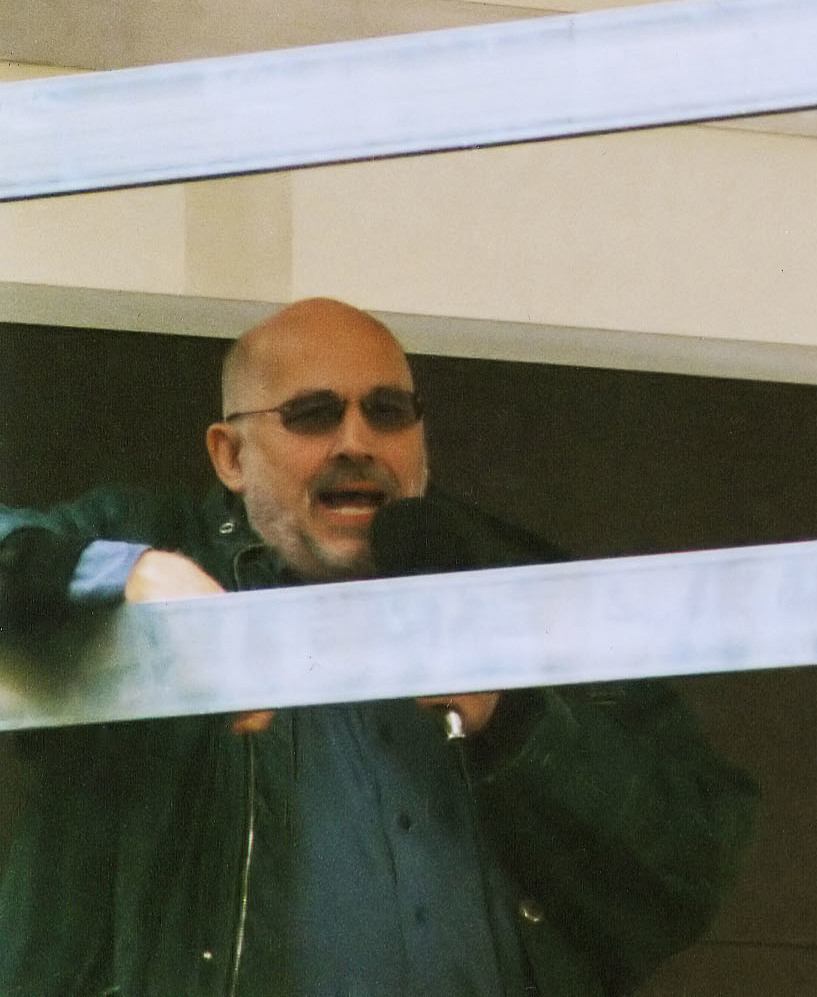
- Mahler in 2001
- Born: 23 January 1936; Haynau, Gau Silesia, German Reich
- Died: 27 July 2025 (aged 89); Berlin, Germany
- Education: Freie Universität Berlin
- Occupations: Lawyer; political activist
- Organizations: NPD (2000–2003); RAF (1970–1975); SDS (1956–1960); SPD (1956–1960)

Horst Mahler (German: [ˈhɔʁst ˈmaːlɐ]; 23 January 1936 – 27 July 2025) was a German lawyer and political activist. He was a far-left militant and a founding member of the Red Army Faction in 1970 before switching to neo-Nazism in the late 1990s. Between 2000 and 2003, he was a member of the far-right National Democratic Party of Germany. From 2003, he was repeatedly convicted of Volksverhetzung ("incitement of popular hatred") and Holocaust denial, and he served much of a twelve-year prison sentence.

In April 2017, Mahler was ordered back to prison for a further three and a half years. On 18 April 2017, he fled Germany, hoping to avoid prison. His attempt to receive political asylum in Hungary was rejected, and he was deported back to Germany, where he was arrested and put back in jail to finish serving his sentence.

== Early life and career ==
Mahler was born at Haynau (Note: Now Chojnów, Poland.) in Gau Silesia on 23 January 1936, the son of a dentist. In February 1945, as the end of World War II in Europe began, the family fled from the approaching Red Army to Naumburg an der Saale. Less than a year later they moved first to Dessau, and then in 1949 to West Berlin after Mahler's father – a fanatical Nazi and antisemite – had committed suicide.

Mahler took his school-leaving exams in Wilmersdorf, Berlin in 1955 and then studied law at the Free University of Berlin with the support of the German National Merit Foundation. He joined the Thuringia Association, a right-wing Studentenverbindung, but soon afterwards became a member of the socialist student body SDS. He founded a law firm in Berlin in 1964 and specialised in advising small and medium enterprises. In 1966, he successfully argued a case before the European Court of Human Rights.

== Far-left wing activity ==
=== Early political activism ===
Prior to 1960, Mahler was a member of the Social Democratic Party of Germany and the leftist students' association Sozialistischer Deutscher Studentenbund (SDS). He was expelled from the SPD in 1960, along with other members of the SDS, who were no longer an SPD youth wing but had become a radical left-wing group. He joined the new organisation's call for "extra-parliamentary opposition", or forceful resistance. Mahler joined the Außerparlamentarische Opposition in 1964.

After the attempted assassination of Rudi Dutschke in 1968, Mahler took part in the violent protests against the Springer Publishing House, for which he was arrested.

Mahler became active as a lawyer who defended left-wing students facing criminal prosecution. By 1970, he had defended Rudi Dutschke, Beate Klarsfeld, Fritz Teufel and Rainer Langhans (both participants of the Kommune 1), Peter Brandt (the eldest son of Willy Brandt), as well as subsequent Red Army Faction members Andreas Baader and Gudrun Ensslin.

=== Founding of the RAF ===
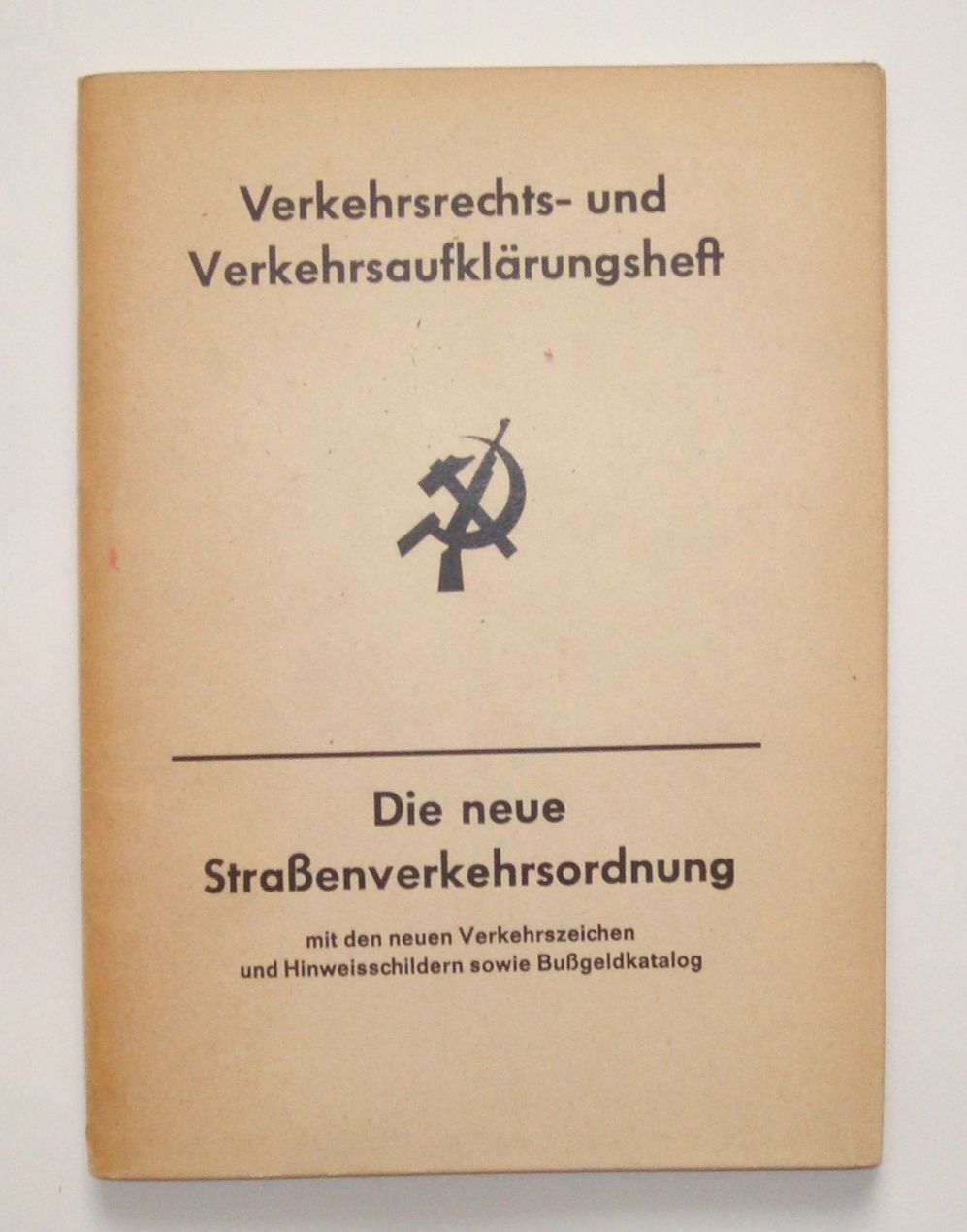
Early Red Army Faction manifesto by Mahler, featuring the RAF logo (1971). The title page is meant to resemble an East German traffic law manual.

In 1970, he became a founding member of the leftist group, the Red Army Faction (RAF). Having earlier befriended Gudrun Ensslin and Andreas Baader, Mahler helped plot to spring Baader from prison in May shortly after his arrest. The four, including Ulrike Meinhof, fled to Jordan and trained in guerrilla tactics with the Popular Front for the Liberation of Palestine. On their return, the four committed a series of bank robberies in September 1970.

Mahler was arrested with fellow RAF members Ingrid Schubert, Brigitte Asdonk, and Irene Goergens on 8 October 1970. He was tried and convicted for the bank robberies and for assisting a prison escape. By 1974, Mahler had been sentenced to fourteen years' imprisonment and had had his license to practice law revoked.

=== Imprisonment ===
In prison, Mahler wrote a manifesto. The rest of the RAF, however, resoundingly rejected it, effectively expelling him from the group. Mahler now advocated the policies of the KPD/AO (Organization to Rebuild the Communist Party of Germany). Then, in 1975, the Movement 2 June took Peter Lorenz hostage and demanded, among other things, that Mahler be freed from prison. Mahler was offered liberty, but refused it.

In 1980, Mahler was freed from prison after serving ten years of his fourteen-year sentence. This was largely due to the efforts of his lawyer, Gerhard Schröder, who would later (1998–2005) be Chancellor of the reunited Germany. In 1988, again with the help of Schröder, Mahler was granted permission to resume practising law in Germany.

== Switch to far-right politics ==
=== Beginning ===
Mahler made the acquaintance of political theorists Iring Fetscher and Günter Rohrmoser, who visited him in prison. While the German courts noted a change in Mahler's political position in the mid-1980s, he first gained attention for it at Rohrmoser's 70th birthday celebration on 1 December 1997. There Mahler gave a speech declaring that Germany was "occupied" and had to free itself from its "debt bondage" to reestablish its national identity.

Mahler took little role in politics until 1998, when an article by him called Zweite Steinzeit ("Second Stone Age") explaining his conversion to Völkisch ideas appeared in the right-wing paper Junge Freiheit. Mahler later underlined the spiritual side of his political beliefs, while attaching it to anti-semitism, arguing that:

In the German people as free self-confidence, the unity of God and Man appears in the Folk-community knowing itself. This is the existing negation of the Jewish Principle and of the haggler/bargainer as its worldly shape.

=== NPD ===
Mahler joined the far-right National Democratic Party of Germany (Nationaldemokratische Partei Deutschlands, NPD) in 2000. In 2001, the German government began a process to attempt to ban the NPD, during which time Mahler acted as an attorney for the NPD. The government, citing accusations of Volksverhetzung ("hate speech") against the NPD, petitioned the court to allow them to seize Mahler's computer assets. Mahler successfully defeated the attempt.

In 2003, after the official case to ban the NPD had been rejected by the German courts, Mahler left the NPD.

== From late 2003 ==
Mahler was involved in founding the Society for the Rehabilitation of Those persecuted for Denial of the Holocaust (Verein zur Rehabilitierung der wegen Bestreitens des Holocaust Verfolgten, VRBHV) in Vlotho on 9 November 2003. He announced the formation of the society with an open letter in which he stated that its objective was "to eliminate the isolation of the persecuted which has dominated so far, is to guarantee the necessary public awareness of their struggle for justice, and is to provide the financial means for a successful judicial struggle".

From 2003, Mahler faced numerous charges in German courts, including a charge of Volksverhetzung in connection with statements he made regarding the 11 September 2001 terrorist attacks on the United States. He told the court that the incident was a "concocted conspiracy" and that "it is not true that al-Qaeda had anything to do with it". He was also charged for Holocaust denial under the Volksverhetzung law in 2004 in connection with his role in the VRBHV. His passport was revoked for six months by the German authorities in January 2006 to prevent him attending the International Conference to Review the Global Vision of the Holocaust in Tehran, Iran.

On 8 April 2004, the local court of Berlin-Tiergarten issued a Berufsverbot against Mahler, forbidding him to practice law. The Amtsgericht cited two comments made by Mahler to justify his disbarment: "The destruction of the Jews is an act of reason..." ("In der Vernichtung der Juden waltet Vernunft...") and "Billions of people would be ready to forgive Hitler if he had only murdered the Jews" ("Milliarden Menschen wären bereit, Hitler zu verzeihen, wenn er nur den Judenmord begangen hätte").

In an interview in 2005 with the Israeli reporter, Naftali Glicksberg, Mahler claimed that he is partly of Jewish descent. He described how his mother, bursting into tears, told him and his brothers that they have Jewish ancestry and are one-eighth Jewish.

In November 2007, Mahler was facing new Volksverhetzung charges stemming from an interview for Vanity Fair with Michel Friedman (CDU), a former vice president of the Central Council of Jews in Germany. Friedman, who intended to interview Mahler about his role in the RAF, brought charges against Mahler alleging that he was greeted with a Hitler salute and a shout of "Heil Hitler, Herr Friedman!" During the interview, Mahler told Friedman that "the systematic extermination of Jews in Auschwitz is a lie" and that Adolf Hitler was "the savior of the German people [but] not only of the German people."

On 23 November 2007, the Amtsgericht in Cottbus sentenced Mahler to six months' imprisonment without parole for having given Hitler salute when reporting to prison for a nine-month term the previous year. Mahler claimed to have performed the salute as a "testimonial of his worldview" ("Zeugnis seiner Weltanschauung"). Mahler was defended by Sylvia Stolz for a period. Stolz was also convicted and imprisoned in 2008.

On 21 February 2009, Mahler was sentenced by a Munich court to six years' imprisonment without possibility of reduction or bail. During the reading of the verdict, the judge said that Mahler had proven "not able to be re-educated" and declared that the "nationalist rattle" of and "nonsense spread" by Horst Mahler should stop. On 11 March a Potsdam court then sentenced the 73-year-old Mahler to an additional five years' imprisonment for Holocaust denial and banalization of Nazi war crimes. Mahler was adjudged an escape risk, so the sentence was carried out immediately. He was released in August 2015 owing to ill health; the lower part of his leg was amputated because of an infection.

During April 2017, Mahler was believed to have fled Germany. His sentence was lengthened following offences committed while he was in prison. In a video posted on YouTube, since removed, he had said he intended to appeal for asylum in another country. On 12 May 2017, Mahler published a message stating that he was seeking asylum in Hungary as a politically persecuted refugee. He was detained by the Hungarian authorities on Monday, 15 May 2017 in Sopron. The Hungarian embassy in Berlin on 15 May said his application for asylum would not be accepted, but it was unclear when Mahler would be returned to Germany to complete his sentence. On 13 June 2017, Mahler was deported to Germany by Hungarian authorities; he was greeted by lawyers after landing in Berlin and transferred to a Brandenburg prison.

Mahler was released from prison on 27 October 2020.

Mahler died in Berlin on 27 July 2025, at the age of 89.

== In film ==
Mahler appears in the film Germany in Autumn (Deutschland im Herbst, 1978), where he is interviewed in his prison cell for television. According to an April 1979 review in The New York Times by Vincent Canby, Mahler "speaks eloquently about the roots of postwar radicalism, though he now disavows terrorism that, he says, has become no different from the ills that prompted the left's original frustration and dissent."

Mahler is the subject of the documentary Die Anwälte – Eine deutsche Geschichte (The Lawyers: A German History, 2009), directed by Birgit Schulz. The film charts the life and career of Mahler and two other RAF lawyers, Otto Schily and Hans-Christian Ströbele, both during and after their association with the RAF.
