= Petra Krause =

German-Italian terrorist (1939–2025)

Petra Krause (19 February 1939 – April 2025) was a Jewish-German-Italian Holocaust survivor and a communist militant who, along with her gang, supplied weapons to groups including the Red Army Faction (RAF) in Germany and the Red Brigades in Italy.

== Biography ==
Krause was born in Berlin on 19 February 1939. She and her Jewish-German family were deported to Auschwitz concentration camp, where her mother was murdered. Krause survived abuse and medical experiments. After the war she moved from East- to West-Germany, and, in 1957, to Italy. In 1975 she was arrested in Zurich on suspicion of smuggling explosives and arms for various terrorist groups throughout half of Europe. She was defended by attorney Bernard Rambert of the "Legal Advice Collective" (Rechtsauskunft Anwaltskollektiv) and in 1977 extradited to Italy, where she was released after a few days. In 1981, she was sentenced in absentia by the Court of Appeals of the Canton of Zürich.

The proceedings against Krause in Switzerland took place against the background of the events of the German Autumn, and also led to controversy over the conditions of her detention. This was also the time of leftist terrorism in Switzerland.

Krause was friends with the German politician and DDR agent Brigitte Heinrich. In Zurich she had worked for a short time with the bookseller Theo Pinkus.

On 2 April 2025, it was announced that Krause had died at the age of 86.
