= Brigitte Heinrich =

German journalist and a Green party politician (1941–1987)

- Born: 29 June 1941; Frankfurt am Main, Germany
- Died: 29 December 1987 (aged 46); Frankfurt am Main, West Germany
- Education: Frankfurt
- Occupations: university lecturer, journalist, politician
- Political party: Green

Brigitte Heinrich (29 June 1941 – 29 December 1987) was a German journalist and a Green party politician.

== Biography ==
In 1966, she became a press spokesperson for the Socialist German Student Union ("Sozialistische Deutsche Studentenbund" / SDS). After completing her degree in Applied Economics ("Volkswirtschaft"), in 1970 she travelled in the Middle-East. During the 1970s she took a lectureship in "International Relations" at Frankfurt University. During this time she maintained contacts with various terrorist groups.

On 26 November 1974 Brigitte Heinrich was arrested. This was part of "Aktion Winterreise", a nationwide raid in fifteen towns and cities, which targeted RAF supporters in the aftermath of the murder of Berlin Court President Günter von Drenkmann by members of the 2 June Movement. Heinrich was arrested on suspicion of "illegal trafficking in weapons and explosives". All those arrested were released after two weeks, possibly apart from Heinrich. Sources differ over whether she was released after a couple of weeks like the others but then re-arrested soon afterwards, or whether, unlike the others, she remained in investigative custody at this point. Heinrich vehemently protested her innocence and some months later became seriously ill. She was released "for reasons of health" before the prosecuting authorities had completed their work on her case.

She returned to Frankfurt University where for several years she combined with her other work the presidency of the student parliament. In 1978 she published a pamphlet in Italian in Milan in the form of a "diary from the dungeon" in which she presented "Aktion Winterreise" as an act of state persecution of intellectuals in Germany, of which she had been a victim. There are indications that during her time in Milan in the late 1970s Heinich was in close contact with members of the Red Brigade terrorist groups.

By 1980 Brigitte Heinrich had developed a significant media profile, and between 1980 or 1981 and 1984 she worked as a regular journalist for the Berlin-based Tageszeitung (a daily newspaper). One of her colleagues at the newspaper was the radical lawyer Klaus Croissant. It was also in 1980 that Brigitte Heinrich finally faced trial. She received a 21 month prison sentence "for weapons smuggling". The context for her trial was her involvement in a German-Italian-Swiss "anarchist" network which was headed up by her friend, the German-Italian alleged terrorist Petra Krause. Possibly on account of her excellent media contacts, and the widespread belief on the radical left that prison conditions for West German "political prisoners" were exceptionally grim, Heinrich's imprisonment became something of a 'cause célèbre'. Several sources strongly hint that it was because of this that she served her sentence under conditions of "semi-freedom", described by one source as a "daytime release", which enabled her to continue providing contributions to the Tageszeitung while returning to prison at nights.

Her sentence was completed at the end of 1983, and she accepted the offer of a place on the party list of the Green Party for the European parliamentary election in June 1984. Reflecting the fringe position which the party then occupied on the West German political spectrum, her name was placed second on the list and she accordingly became one of the seven German Green Party members of the parliament, retaining her seat till her sudden death in 1987. She died as the result of a heart attack two days before the end of the year.

Her funeral took place on 6 January 1988 in the principal chamber of the Frankfurt Main Cemetery and was attended by members and representatives from a range of left-wing groups from many countries.

=== Agent of the East German security services ===
Following reunification in 1990 researchers gained access to a vast archive of the carefully compiled documentation produced between 1950 and 1989 by the East Germany Ministry for State Security "(Stasi)". It was discovered that since the early part of 1981 Heinrich had been passing information to the East German security services. She was identified in Stasi records under the code names "IM Taler" and also, after 1983 as "Beate Schäfer".

While they worked together on the Tageszeitung Brigitte Heinrich and Klaus Croissant also teamed up together in their personal lives. In this connection Heinrich was recruited, apparently by Croissant, as a Stasi informer. She worked for Hauptabteilung XXII ("Main department 22") which concerned itself with "observing" terrorism in West Germany. It was only after she died that it became known to authorities in the west that she had received her orders through Klaus Croissant and transmitted her reports to Stasi handlers in East Berlin through him.

It is not clear from sources how the Hessischer regional branch of the Green Party came to nominate Brigitte Heinrich as a candidate for the 1984 European parliamentary election, but it is clear from sources that emerged subsequently that she only accepted the nomination after discussion with Stasi handlers. As a member of the European parliament Heinrich became important not just to the Stasi's "Hauptabteilung XXII" but also to its National Intelligence Directorate ("Hauptverwaltung Aufklärung" / HVA). The HVA was East Germany's intelligence service with respect to West Germany. Most intelligence activity conducted on behalf of Warsaw Pact governments and Western Europe was tightly controlled from Moscow by the KGB. With respect to West Germany, however, it was far more effective to conduct espionage from East Germany because the extent of the shared language and kinships, culture and histories of East and West Germany meant that the pool of potential sympathizers, informants and secret intelligence operatives was immeasurably vast. As "Beate Schäfer" she was able to report, after May 1984, on the discussions between the national sub-groups of the parliament's Green group. The HVA were keen that she should become influential within the parliamentary Green faction and accordingly insisted that she distance herself from the "militant activist scene" in West Germany. In this way she might become more than a conventional "Stasi informant". As an influential voice of the left she would be able to influence detailed discussions within the European parliament and its committees in ways that aligned more closely with East German government objectives. From Stasi records it is apparent that "from 29 November 1984 Dr. Croissant and Brigitte Heinich unconditionally separated themselves from the terrorist scene". Heinrich was instructed to raise her profile in the Green Party and in the increasingly important "peace movement". By the time of her sudden death at the end of December 1987 it appears that she was succeeding. Through Croissant she had submitted detailed reports to her handlers containing a multiplicity of detail about meetings involving the "rainbow coalition" within the European parliament and involving the party's Bundestag group in the West German capital. She had also attended at least eight meetings with senior HVA officers.
