= Inge Viett =

German militant (1944–2022)

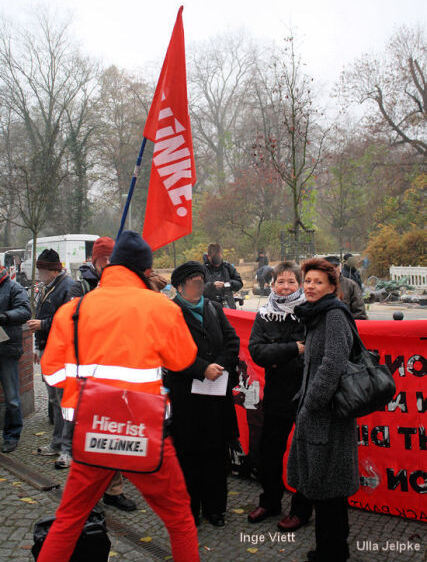
- Viett (2nd from right) at a demonstration in 2011 with Left Party politician Ulla Jelpke
- Born: 12 January 1944; Stemwarde, Schleswig-Holstein, Prussia, Germany
- Died: 9 May 2022 (aged 78); Falkensee, Brandenburg, Germany
- Other names: Eva-Maria Sommer; Eva Schnell
- Education: Kiel University
- Occupations: Child care worker; stripper; film editor; reprographer; author
- Years active: 1968-1982
- Era: Long twentieth century
- Agents: 2 June Movement; Red Army Faction
- Notable work: Nie war ich furchtloser
- Movement: Anti-imperialism

Inge Viett (12 January 1944 – 9 May 2022) was a member of the West German left-wing militant organisations "2 June Movement" and the "Red Army Faction (RAF)", which she joined in 1980. In 1982 she became the last of ten former RAF members who escaped from West to East Germany and received support from state authorities, including the Ministry for State Security.

After reunification and her conviction for attempted murder, Viett was sentenced to a thirteen-year jail term, but was released early in 1997. By that time she had, while still in prison, published her first book. Described sometimes in sources as a "retired terrorist", Viett differed from other leading participants in West Germany's extremist-terrorist wave of the 1970s to the extent she was willing to talk about, and indeed to write about, those events from the activist perspective. Her participation in street demonstrations and apparent absence of contrition over her involvement with left-wing militancy continue to attract media interest and comment.

== Life ==
=== Early years ===
Viett was born in Stemwarde, a short distance to the east of Hamburg, Schleswig-Holstein, Prussia, Germany, later in the British occupation zone. The authorities removed her from her mother's care and she spent her early years, between 1946 and 1950, living in an orphanage in Schleswig-Holstein. In March 1950 she was placed with a foster family in a village of three hundred people near Eckernförde. Viett would later describe the experience, especially with regard to her foster mother's attempts to bring her up, as "very burdensome" ("sehr belastend"). Her comments on the wider community in the area were more damning. At one stage she was raped by a local farmer. She attended school in the village. When she was fifteen she ran away from the foster family. With the support of the local minister she obtained a place for a year in a Youth Facility at nearby Arnis where she was taught about house-keeping and child-care. The authorities then intervened to have her sent to train as a child-care assistant. Viett herself wanted to train to be a sports-teacher and found the training for work as a child-care assistant "ghastly" ("gräßlich"). The situation led her to a suicide attempt. The training nevertheless continued, and during her final practical year she was sent as a children's carer to a prosperous family in Hamburg. Here Viett suffered on account of the authoritarian propensities of the father. She also had a good relationship at the time with a twenty year old supporter-trainer in Schleswig, who took on responsibility for her progress and made it possible for her to attend the sports school. In addition, she became involved with an Afro-American soldier. In 1963 she embarked on a Sports and Gymnastics course at Kiel University, but after six terms - shortly before graduation - she broke off these studies.

Now she moved back to Hamburg, struggling with a succession of casual jobs. For two months she worked as a stripper in the city's St. Pauli quarter. During this period her appreciation crystallised that "capitalism was the cause of social injustice". With her partner she then moved again, setting up home in Wiesbaden where she worked as a graphics assistant. After the two women's relationship broke up she took work in a succession of support roles, working variously as a tour guide, film cutter, domestic servant, and barmaid.

=== Außerparlamentarische Opposition ===
In 1968 Viett relocated to the Kreuzberg district in West Berlin where she moved in to what one source described as "a women's apartment" at number 22 Eisenbahnstraße with three other politically aware women, Waltraut Siepert, Anke-Rixa Hansen, and Ursula Scheu. With the others she took part in meetings, demonstrations, and other actions of the Außerparlamentarische Opposition, a group of mainly student aged political activists committed to expressly "extra-parliamentary" opposition to the West German political establishment. She later wrote that a defining element in her own politicisation was a trip lasting several months that she took to North Africa. She was deeply impressed by the contrast between the poverty she encountered there and the prosperity of many in the west, along with accompanying excesses. During a street demonstration she was arrested by a civilian official after involvement in throwing a paving stone, and was held overnight in police custody. This brief experience of imprisonment, she later asserted, marked a deep break with her past. Professionally she was at the time undertaking an internship with a film copying business in order to be able to embark on an apprenticeship at a later date. But her night in the police cell led her to hand in her notice in order to devote herself to her political activism.

Participation in militant actions followed. In the early 1970s an arson attack on the vehicle fleet of the Axel Springer publishing house failed because of "technical difficulties". Viett learned how to prepare and use Molotov cocktails. In December 1971 she was one of the squatters involved in the occupation of the Georg von Rauch Haus, close to her home in Kreuzberg. When police made a move towards the house, and took up positions directly in front of it, it was her fellow squatters who prevented her from throwing Molotov cocktails at them from the roof.

Other actions in 1971 were directed against the display windows of wedding dress shops and sex shops. On at least one occasion she undertook her actions with fellow activist Verena Becker. People clearing up the broken glass of the shop windows found printed calling cards had been left behind with the mysterious warning, Die schwarze Braut kommt (transl. The black bride is coming). Beauty pageants in department stores were also targeted. She became involved in organised theft campaigns against department stores, sending the items stolen to those who had been arrested. During the early 1970s she moved to the Liebenwalde Street commune, described as a centre of Schwarze Hilfe (loosely: Black support).

=== 2 June movement ===
Viett ended up as a member of the 2 June Movement, recruited by Bommi Baumann. She moved back to her former home at 22 Eisenbahnstraße in order to escape the state surveillance to which the Liebenwalde Street commune was presumed to be subject. It was at the Eisenbahnstraße that she and the three others formed an activist cell which later grew to number seven members. They needed to finance their activities so started with an attack, in which Viett participated, on a bank. That was unsuccessful and had to be aborted, but a later bank attack succeeded.

Bommi Baumann's evaluation of Inge Viett, whom he recruited into the 2 June Movement

"Sie war zuverlässig und sehr ruhig, aber sehr radikal."
"She was reliable and very calm, but very radical"

Following the "Bloody Sunday" killings in Derry, in January 1972 the group planned a bomb attack on a British officers' casino in Berlin. The conspirators intended that the bomb should explode during the night of 2 February 1972, but in the event it was placed by one of them, identified as a student, Harald Sommerfeld, outside the door of the adjacent address, which was a British Yacht Club. Sommerfeld omitted to activate the fuse and the bomb was found by the boat builder and Yacht Club concierge, Erwin Beelitz. Beelitz took the bomb and placed it in a clamp, apparently intending to work on it. The bomb now exploded, killing Beelitz. Viett later described her reaction as one of shock. She did not consider herself responsible for the death of Beelitz, however, which she characterised as a fatal accident.

On 7 May 1972, Viett was one of a number of people arrested at Bad Neuenahr in connection with alleged terrorist activities. Others detained included Ulrich Schmücker. She was held in the prison at Koblenz for four months and then transferred to a women's prison along the Lehrter Straße in West Berlin. From January 1973 (sources are inconsistent as to precise dates) she was participating in a five-week nationwide prisoners' hunger strike in support of demands for better conditions. Later that year, using a file that a fellow inmate had smuggled into the establishment, she was able to escape through the barred window of the first-floor television room which the prisoners were permitted to use for two hours each week. She moved for a few days into a women's residential collective and resumed her links with the 2 June Movement, devoting herself to a reorganisation of it. She also took the opportunity to learn to use a gun in Berlin's Grunewald (forest) and Tegel forest. Early on the group now attacked a gun shop, thereby upgrading their weapons collection.

They then planned the kidnap of a prominent member of the political establishment as a way to apply pressure for the release of prisoners. Viett was centrally involved in the planning. Following the death of Holger Meins during the hunger strike campaign, there was a perceived need for a swift reaction. They selected as their kidnap target Günter von Drenkmann, the chairman of the Berlin Chamber of Commerce. However, the attempt, launched on 10 November 1974, went wrong. Von Drenkmann was shot, and a few hours later died in hospital. Their next target was Peter Lorenz, lead candidate for the CDU (party) in the forthcoming Berlin elections. Again, Viett was centrally involved in the planning and implementation of the Lorenz kidnap. The result of the action was that several terrorist members of the 2 June Movement were released. Lorenz was released on 4 March 1975.

After this Viett and a fellow "2 June" member fled to Beirut intending to meet up with prisoners who had been released and with other contacts who had fled to South Yemen. She spoke with Ali Hassan Salameh and with Abu Iyad, but apparently without any concrete results. After several weeks she returned to Europe. That was followed by a further visit to Lebanon where she undertook a military training course covering technical aspects of weapons, before again returning to Berlin. Later in the summer of 1975 the 2 June Movement undertook two bank attacks in West Berlin, during at least one of which they attracted additional headlines by distributing "chocolate kisses" (marshmallows coated in chocolate) to bank customers caught up in the raid.

A further arrest followed on 9 September 1975. Viett was detained in a police exercise that also led to the arrests of Ralf Reinders and Juliane Plambeck. In a succession of further arrests the police now rapidly captured almost all the members of the 2 June Movement. Viett found herself back in the same cell that she had occupied before at the women's prison in Berlin's Lehrter Straße. An escape attempt on 24 December 1975 failed. She was part of a successful escape plan that was implemented on 7 July 1976 which involved getting hold of duplicate keys and overpowering two prison officials. Those who escaped also included Gabriele Rollnik, Monika Berberich and Juliane Plambeck. Berberich was recaptured while Viett and the other two travelled to Baghdad where, this time, they were reunited with some of the freed prisoners from 1975. She travelled in South Yemen where she spent three months in a Palestinian training camp. Here she adopted the cover name "Intissar".

Returning to Europe, Viett and other members of the movement went to Vienna where the businessman Walter Palmers was kidnapped for ransom. He was released against a payment of slightly more than 30 million schillings. Viett escaped to Italy. Then, with the intention of carrying out another prisoner-release exercise in West Berlin, she travelled via Prague and Berlin-Schönefeld (then in East Berlin), to West Berlin. She was approached, while still in East Berlin, by officers of the Ministry for State Security who, much to her surprise, knew her real identity. A two-hour discussion followed. Since the erection in 1961 of the Berlin Wall, travel between the two halves of Berlin had been severely restricted, but during her discussion Viett received assurances from Colonel Harry Dahl that the East German authorities would not be collaborating with the West German police in her case, and that she could therefore be assured of free access to East Germany. This level of backing from the East German authorities would later turn out to be more important than would necessarily have been apparent when Viett received the assurances.

On 27 May 1978, a 2 June commando group succeeded in extracting Till Meyer from West Berlin's Moabit Jail. (An attempt to free Andreas Vogel at the same time failed.) Viett then travelled with Meyer and the commandos to East Berlin, using the Friedrichstraße frontier crossing. Weapons concealed on their bodies proved problematic, and Viett pleaded with the officials, recalling her earlier meeting with the Stasi officials. The group were permitted to enter East Germany, although the weapons had to be handed over. They then travelled on to Bulgaria. On 21 June 1978 Till Meyer, Gabriele Rollnik, Gudrun Stürmer and Angelika Goder were recaptured by a West German anti-terrorism unit at Burgas Airport. However, Viett and two others managed to evade capture and travel to Sofia, from where they moved on to Prague.

In Prague Viett was interrogated for three days by the Czechoslovak authorities. She then quoted a cover name and demanded to be put in touch with the East German authorities. As a result, three Ministry for State Security (Stasi) officers from East Germany turned up, removed her from her prison cell and took her back to East Germany. For two weeks she was accommodated in a Stasi property: then she was taken to Berlin Schönefeld Airport from where the authorities arranged a flight to Baghdad for her. She stayed in Baghdad for three months before returning the Europe where Inge Viett settled in Paris. She later described her own mood and that of fellow group members at this time as "somewhat resigned".

=== Red Army Faction ===
Around this time Viett became involved in discussions over a possible merger of the 2 June Movement and the RAF. On 5 May 1980, Sieglinde Hofmann, Ingrid Barabass, Regina Nicolai, Karola Magg and Karin Kamp were all arrested while participating in a meeting in Paris to discuss the merger. Not for the first time, Viett avoided arrest. On 2 June 1978, the 2 June Movement dissolved itself. Many of its members were now in prison. A handful of those still at liberty, including Viett, decided to switch over to the RAF. Within the RAF, she took on responsibility for relations with the Stasi, whose agenda evidently sometimes coincided with that of the West German terrorist group. An issue arose concerning eight "drop out" RAF members who no longer wished to participate in the group's violent activities and had become stranded without credible identity papers in Prague. Viett sought help from her Stasi contacts to have these individuals conducted to safety in "Black Africa". The Stasi expressed concern that the proposal was impractical on several levels, not least because the RAF "drop outs" might disclose what they knew of links between the East German ministry and the West German terrorist group. Instead the eight were invited to relocate to East Germany where they were issued with new identities and coached till they had mastered their cover stories, before being distributed across the remoter corners of East Germany and permitted to start new lives, albeit under surveillance, and without being able to contact one another. After agreeing the transfers of the eight from Prague and seeing them safely into East Germany Viett herself headed back to South Yemen to think through her own position. Within the RAF she felt herself hemmed in. After six weeks she returned to Europe and, together with three other RAF members, undertook a further stint of military training in East Germany. Then she returned to the west and lived clandestinely in a house run by the RAF in Namur, Wallonia.

=== Incident in Paris ===
In August 1981 Inge Viett took a ride through Paris on a Suzuki moped that she had purchased. Regulations by this time required that moped riders should wear a helmet, but she was not wearing any. Two traffic policemen signalled her to stop after she "jumped a traffic light" and she did what she could to get away from them. The policemen were on relatively powerful motor bikes and gave chase. One of them fell off, but the other continued the pursuit alone. A lengthy chase through Paris ensued, with Viett eventually abandoning her moped and making her way on foot. In a parking garage she came across one of the policemen and approached him, pointing a gun at him. According to Viett the policeman reached for his own gun at which point she shot him from a distance of around four meters. Francis Violleau, the policeman, suffered a neck injury as a result of which he was confined to a wheel chair for nineteen years until his death at age 54, in 2000.

Viett was identified from finger prints found on her moped and on her abandoned handbag, but by that time she had returned to the house in Namur. She then took another trip to South Yemen. By this time she was nurturing increasing doubts over the effectiveness of the "armed struggle". She realised that the RAF was socially isolated, and that even within the political left, any messages from its "actions" really only reached the most marginalised groups.

=== Flight to East Germany ===
In 1982, Inge Viett became the RAF's tenth (and final) "drop out" and slipped across to East Germany. For the next six months she lived in a secluded apartment provided by the Stasi, while she prepared her new self. Her new name was "Eva-Maria Sommer". The original plan would have been to bury her West German connections, but frequent memory lapses meant she continued to use western words, such as "Supermarket", in place of their East German equivalents, such as, here, "Kaufhalle". She was unable to master the endless acronyms specific to East Germany such as EOS, POS, NSW, SW, AWG, and KWV. The decision was therefore made to "relaunch" her as a newly arrived immigrant from West Germany. That avoided the likely pitfalls from her failure to master East German idioms, but immigrants from West Germany were vanishingly rare in East Germany and she accordingly risked standing out in any crowd on account of her western provenance. The newly arrived migrant from West Germany settled in a quarter in Dresden. While West German police feverishly sought the terrorist Inge Viett, in the Dresden quarter of Prohlis Eva-Maria Sommer started to build her new life. She undertook and completed an apprenticeship in printing and copying and took a job at the Völkerfreundschaft (transl. People's Friendship) printing shop at 32 Riesaer Straße in Dresden. She was also recruited to the Stasi's vast network of Informal collaborators. On 25 February 1983, she was logged as "IMB Maria Berger" ("Informal collaborator - watcher, Maria Berger") with the reference number XV/2385/83 for Department XXII/8, the Stasi's sub-department for counter-terrorism.

=== Dresden years ===
Colleagues must have realised quickly that their new comrade from the west was well connected. Just six months after taking her job, she acquired a car. Normally comrades would have had to save massively and then spend several years with their names on a waiting list before acquiring any car. Eva-Maria Sommer's car was not just any car: it was a Lada. Aware of the envy her car attracted from colleagues she then switched her Lada for a Trabant. She acquired a new life-partner with a newspaper "lonely hearts" announcement placed in Autumn 1983: "Seeking hiking friend for passing the hours together" ("Suche Wanderfreundin für gemeinsame Stunden...").

In 1987, Eva-Maria Sommer's time in Dresden ended abruptly after three and a half years. One colleague had been permitted to travel to West Germany where she had found herself with time to kill at Frankfurt Station (Frankfurt a/M Hbf). Her eye was caught by a "wanted" poster featuring twelve photo-portraits of RAF terrorist suspects. Only nine of the suspects were featured since for each of three of them - presumably the most important three - there were two pictures. Two faces on the bottom row showed a girl in a long blonde wig who looked strangely familiar. The poster also mentioned a distinguishing feature for Inge Viett. There was a 1 cm scar on the right index finger: its position on the finger was described with teutonic precision. Eva-Maria Sommer was Inge Viett. Viett recognised she must disappear fast. Disclosure that East Germany was harbouring wanted West German terrorist suspects could be incalculably damaging to East Germany. The ministry organised her disappearance with characteristic speed and thoroughness: Eva-Maria Sommer's true identity remained undisclosed for another six years. She needed to think and decided to travel to South Yemen. But this time she stayed in East Germany, moving to a discreet apartment in East Berlin's Marzahn district while work began on creating another new identity for her.

=== Magdeburg years ===
Viett's new identity, which she was ready to inhabit, after nine months of preparation, in 1987, was as Eva Schnell. She was evidently by now sufficiently familiar with East German culture and phrases to be able to present herself as an East German citizen of long standing, who had worked with her husband in his small business until she was widowed. Now, in her early 40s, she was embarking on a new life in Magdeburg where she lived at an address in an apartment block along the Hans-Grundig-Straße in a quarter in the north of the city. She was employed as a group leader in a children's holiday camp run for employees of the "Karl-Liebknecht Heavy Machinery Conglomerate" (as it was known at that time). She was responsible for a budget of one million marks and a team of three co-workers: she would describe the work environment as "initially very tense". To her the operation appeared "larger and more complex than the entire city of Magdeburg", and in those early months she frequently felt she had lost control.

An annual cultural high-point for Eva Schnell was the Magdeburg Cabaret which was "permanently sold out", but for which she was nevertheless able frequently to obtain tickets.

=== Reacting to the changes in the 1980s ===
After spending the first 36 years of her life as a spectacularly critical citizen of West Germany, Viett was broadly supportive of the "East German project". She was nevertheless critical, in particular, of the level of press reporting and, above all, of the political analysis that appeared in the press. Inge Viett lived in East Germany during a decade of changes which, at the time, were reported only superficially in western media. There was a rising tide of underground political protest which, as the 1980s progressed, increasingly spilled onto the streets. As the bracing winds of Glasnost swept across from, of all places, Moscow, the ruling party was no longer confident that it could rely on fraternal intervention of Soviet troops that had brutally suppressed the protests in 1953, or, in Prague in 1968. In the context of the country's important industrial sector, of which the "Karl-Liebknecht Heavy Machinery Conglomerate" was a part, industrial modernisation in the Soviet Union meant that in commercial terms the two socialist partner countries were increasingly finding themselves competing as rivals in shared export markets. Viett was critical of the changes and what came to be known as the Peaceful Revolution. She attended a "Monday demonstration" in the cathedral. Unlike others present, she found the speeches "aggressive". A "group of churchmen in black skirts" pushed her aside as they made their way past. "Fascist leaflets" were on display by the main door. Viett wondered where to find the "counter-revolution".

At East Germany's first and last free and fair general election, held on 18 March 1990, Eva Schnell helped out as an election assistant at her local polling station. Innovative features of the election included giving voters a choice between several different candidate lists. Under the "single list" system used previously voters were invited to vote "yes" or "no" to the party's list of candidates and then, if they exercised the right to vote "no", risking serious social and economic penalties such as being demoted or fired from their jobs or expelled from school, etc., used a different box for their voting paper. The 1990 election in March effectively marked the end of one- party dictatorship and operated as a precursor to reunification which formally took place in October 1990. The Stasi, which had sponsored Viett's presence in the country, had also been terminated. She nevertheless continued to live and work, as before, in Magdeburg even after the arrest, on 6 June 1990, of Susanne Albrecht who was the first of eight former RAF members to be found living with new identities in what was still, in June 1990, known as the German Democratic Republic.

=== Arrest in Magdeburg and conviction in Koblenz ===
Soon after her arrest in June 1990 Inge Viett wrote a letter which she addresses to "her dear collective" ("ihr Liebes Kollektiv"). It amounted to a timely Paean of praise to the German Democratic Republic.

"Ein Land, das sich die Werte, für die ich lebte, auf seine Fahnen, seine Verfassung und Gesetze geschrieben hat: Antifaschismus, Solidarität, Völkerfreundschaft und Kollektivität. Für diese gesellschaftlichen Ziele hab ich all die Jahre in der DDR mit großer Kraft gelebt und gearbeitet. Es sind die wichtigsten Jahre in meinem Leben."
"A land that had inscribed the values for which I have lived on its flags, in its constitution and in its laws: anti-fascism, solidarity, the friendship of peoples', collectivism. I have worked and lived for these social objectives during my years in the German Democratic Republic with all my strength. These are the most important years in my life."

On 12 June 1990, Viett was arrested as she walked towards the lift in the entrance hall of the Magdeburg apartment block in which she lived. A neighbour had recognised her and reported her to the police as one of the terrorist suspects. She was held for four weeks in East Germany and then handed over to the West German authorities.

Till 1990 prosecutors in West Germany had been unable to unravel with sufficient precision the roles of individual RAF members for the series of terrorist murders that took place in 1977. After 1990, with the suspected ex-terrorists extracted from East Germany, prosecutors were able to offer reduced sentences in exchange for information that could be used to secure convictions in court. Nevertheless, when the district high court in Koblenz convicted Inge Viett in 1992, the charge was one of "attempted murder". The prosecutors had chosen to charge her not in respect of alleged terrorist offences in the 1970s, but in respect of her having shot a policeman in Paris during the summer of 1981, a case concerning which the evidence was less inscrutable. She was sentenced to thirteen years in jail.

=== Release ===
In January 1997 Viett reached the halfway point in her sentence. She was therefore released, and the remaining seven-year term was converted into a suspended sentence. Her first book, the autobiographical work Nie war ich furchtloser: Autobiographie had already been published by the time she was released, and she worked as an author from then on. She never sought to distance herself from the "armed actions" of the RAF.

The film producer Volker Schlöndorff used themes from her autobiographical work for his film The Legend of Rita. Viett accused him and his script-writer, Wolfgang Kohlhaase, of plagiarism. The parties reached an "out of court" settlement.

=== The unbowed radical ===
On 24 February 2007, Viett published a piece in Junge Welt in which she contextualised and defended the terrorism of the RAF. The "political-military struggle" was at that time "the appropriate expression for [their] opposition to capitalism". Looking back, she lamented the way that in the appetite for liberation "the guerilla fight in West Germany and in all the imperialist countries excluded from the headlines the more experienced, intelligent, persistent and constructitive aspects" of the movement. The "armed actions" by the RAF represented one element as "class struggle from below". Forty years ago there was a small collection of people who took the decision to take up the struggle against the German elite and their power structure. Viett asserted that they were motivated by anti-colonialism and national liberation movements.

On 28 July 2008, Viett was briefly arrested at a demonstration against the German army being held at Berlin's Brandenburg Gate. A few months later, following criticism by politicians, she was quoted in the Berlin edition mass market Bild newspaper defending her involvement, "That was an anti-militarist action. And every anti-militarist action is good." Eventually she faced trial, on 22 October 2009. Noting that she was "a pensioner", the court released Viett on the original charges but fined her €225 for "resisting the power of the state" ("Widerstand gegen die Staatsgewalt"), reflecting the manner in which she had resisted the police arresting her.

On 8 January 2011, Viett participated in a panel discussion at the International Rosa Luxemburg Conference in Berlin. The press were in attendance. She called for the construction of a "revolutionary communist organisation with secret structures". That was all part of a "kämpferische Praxis", a (barely) nuanced phrase capable of interpretation as a call for violence. "Bourgeois legal structures" ("bürgerliche Rechtsordnung") could not set the standards in this context. "If Germany conducts war, and German army weaponry is torched in an anti-war action, then the action is a legitimate one: so is sabotaging munitions stores. Wildcat strikes, occupation of businesses or homes, militant anti-fascist actions, countering police attacks etc....". The CDU lawyer-politician Wolfgang Bosbach, at that time chairman of the parliamentary home affairs committee, went on record with his opinion that this amounted to a "call for a violent struggle against the state" ("Aufruf zum gewaltsamen Kampf gegen den Staat"). In November 2011 a Berlin district court fined Viett €1200 for "endorsing criminal acts" ("Billigung von Straftaten").

=== Death ===
Viett died on 9 May 2022 in Falkensee.

== Published output (selection) ==
- Einsprüche! Briefe aus dem Gefängnis. Edition Nautilus, Hamburg 1996, ISBN 3-89401-266-8
- Nie war ich furchtloser: Autobiographie. Edition Nautilus, Hamburg 1997, ISBN 3-89401-270-6. Rowohlt Taschenbuchverlag Reinbek 1999, ISBN 3-499-60769-7.
- Cuba libre bittersüß: Reisebericht. Edition Nautilus, Hamburg 1999, ISBN 3-89401-340-0
- Morengas Erben: eine Reise durch Namibia. Edition Nautilus, Hamburg 2004, ISBN 3-89401-447-4
