= Ingrid Schubert =

German left-wing militant (1944–1977)

- Born: 7 November 1944; Ebern, Germany
- Died: 12 November 1977 (aged 33); Stadelheim Prison, Munich, West Germany
- Years active: 1970–1977
- Organization: Red Army Faction

Ingrid Schubert (7 November 1944 – 12 November 1977) was a West German left-wing militant and founding member of the terrorist organisation Red Army Faction (RAF). She participated in the freeing of Andreas Baader from prison in May 1970 as well as several bank robberies before her arrest in October 1970. She was found dead in her cell in 1977.

== Life ==
Schubert participated with Ulrike Meinhof and Irene Goergens in the freeing of Andreas Baader from prison in May 1970. In the summer of 1970, she travelled with roughly twenty other RAF members to Jordan to undergo military training with the Palestinian militant group Fatah. Within the RAF she went by the codenames Irene and Nina. On 29 September 1970, Schubert drove the getaway car during an RAF robbery of a savings bank in West Berlin. In the summer and autumn of 1970 Schubert took part in at least 2 further bank robberies. On 8 October 1970, she was arrested at an apartment in West Berlin along with RAF members Horst Mahler, Brigitte Asdonk and Irene Goergens.

Schubert was tried along with Horst Mahler and Goergens; the trial began on 1 March 1971, and in April Schubert was sentenced to 13 years in prison. In 1975, she was one of the prisoners whose freedom was demanded during the West German Embassy siege in Stockholm.

Between 1976 and 1977 she was imprisoned in JVA Stuttgart along with Baader, Gudrun Ensslin, Ulrike Meinhof, Jan-Carl Raspe, Irmgard Möller and Brigitte Mohnhaupt, where she took part in several hunger strikes. During the German Autumn of late 1977, the RAF kidnapped Hanns Martin Schleyer and demanded that Schubert and other RAF members were released from prison. After the Mogadishu hijacking, the West German state announced on 18 October 1977 that Baader and Ensslin had committed suicide and that Raspe and Möller were injured. Raspe later died and Möller survived to state that there had not been a suicide pact and the deaths were murders.

== Death ==
Schubert was moved to Stadelheim Prison in Munich and was found dead in her cell on 11 November 1977. The authorities said it was death by hanging. The autopsy did not find evidence of suicide. Schubert had recently told her lawyer that she had no plans to kill herself.

== Legacy ==
When Gerold Braunmühl was killed by the RAF in 1986, the responsibility claim came from the "Kommando Ingrid Schubert".
