= Gabriele Rollnik =

German writer

- Born: 1950 (age 75–76); Dortmund, North Rhine-Westphalia, West Germany
- Education: Free University of Berlin
- Known for: Activist membership of the 2 June Movement

Gabriele Rollnik (born 1950) is a German former terrorist.

She became a member of the 2 June Movement, which had been named after the date, in 1967, on which the student Benno Ohnesorg was fatally shot by a policeman in West Berlin during a demonstration against a visit by the Shah of Iran.

She was sentenced to a fifteen-year jail term in 1981 and released on 14 September 1992 (pre-conviction detention between 1978 and 1981 being taken into account).

== Life ==
Gabriele Rollnik was born and grew up in Dortmund. A source describes her family as "well-to-do". Her father was a policeman. Asked later about her radicalisation, she indicated that she had been impressed by news reports of student protests including the May 1968 events in France, which she had learned about from the television in the family home, where in most respects she found her adolescent life "monochrome and really dull" ("...erschien mir das Leben ziemlich langweilig und eintönig.")

In 1970 Rollnik moved to West Berlin to study for a degree in Sociology at the Free University. Through her political involvement, and influenced by extremist feminism, she decided to join the Trotskyite International Marxist Group. From 1973 she was also active in groups identified as part of the emerging new feminist movement. During her final year she began to work on a dissertation concerning the "compatibility of family and working life", but shortly before she was due to graduate she dropped out of university and took a job as an assembly worker in a Telefunken (radio and television) factory, in order to politicise fellow workers.

=== 2 June Movement ===
While she was still working at Telefunken, Rollnik received an unannounced visit from a girl friend who appeared with a man in tow. Her friend asked if she would let Till Meyer use her apartment. Meyer had recently escaped from prison, just a few weeks before his scheduled release at the end of a three year jail term; he feared further criminal charges because he knew the authorities had found a new prosecution witness. Back in 1971/72 Meyer had been a founder member of the left-wing anarchist 2 June Movement. Having Meyer in her home placed Rollnik in direct contact with what was rapidly becoming a serious terrorist organisation. Meanwhile, she started looking after Meyer, organising identity papers for him. The two became lovers. Rollnik found that she wanted to "meet the others" and "join in properly" ("Ich [wollte] die anderen kennenlernen. Ich wollte richtig mitmachen."). Gabriele Rollnik joined the 2 June Movement shortly after this, still in 1974. Decades later, when it was all over, serious journalists conducted thoughtful interviews to try and understand how and why Rollnik had become involved in terrorism. She appeared to have gained in self-confidence from the sense of belonging to something that she found worthwhile. By this time the movement's most pressing priority, following a wave of arrests in 1973/74, was to liberate the "older and more experienced" comrades from jail. She learned how to fake documents, to crack locks, to shoot: she learned the skills necessary to be able to operate on the wrong side of the law and to be able to "carry out actions". But it was also "fun" ( es machte ihr aber auch „Spaß“").

Rollnik participated in the planning and implementation of the Peter Lorenz kidnapping. Lorenz was a candidate in the West Berlin mayoral elections who was kidnapped three days before the first round of the election on 27 February 1975. Her practical involvement included renting a retail premises at Schenkendorfstraße 7 where she opened a "second-hand shop", the basement of which became the "People's Prison" in which Lorenz was held while unsuspecting customers sought out the bargains overhead, and comrades conducted successful negotiations with the authorities for the release of five imprisoned group members. Lorenz was released unharmed on 2 March 1975, a few hours before the second round of the election in which he had been unable to participate.) A few months later, on 13 September 1975, Gabriele Rollnik was arrested in Berlin. Most of the terrorist suspects arrested were taken to Stammheim Prison on the northside of Stuttgart, but Rollnik was one of four detained in the Lehrter Straße women's prison in West Berlin where conditions were less onerous.

On 7 July 1976 the four women managed to escape through a window in the prison library from the women's prison in West Berlin. Those involved, along with Rollnik, were Monika Berberich, Juliane Plambeck and Inge Viett. Berberich, a qualified lawyer, was a member of the Red Army Faction, while the other three all came from the 2 June Movement. To an outsider, the two groups were broadly similar both in their ideals and in their methods, but at this stage they were still separate and on occasion saw one another as rival organisations. In a trial that took place only four years later it was stated that by the time the four had made it across the roofs to their get-away car, they had overpowered their guards: implements used in the escape had included the tube from a roll of toilet tissues, three bed springs tied together and a fire arm or fire arm replica.

After that escape Rollnik lived unregistered "below the radar", mostly in Germany. In the wake of the successful Lorenz kidnapping the group needed funds in order to rebuild their organisation and devise new strategies. Plans were set in hand for another kidnapping, this time with the objective of ransoming the victim for money. In order to reduce the risk of getting caught up in the growing number of police searches in West Germany, the kidnapping was to take place in Vienna, where the famously rich textiles magnate Walter Michael Palmers was kidnapped on 9 November 1977. His captors held him for around 100 hours after which, in return for a payment of 30.5 Million schillings, he was set free. Two of the terrorists fled the country and were detained at the Swiss-Italian frontier crossing at Chiasso. Five months later the fourth floor apartment that the kidnappers had rented in Vienna-Leopoldstadt was discovered by the authorities on 20 April 1978, when the concierge (Hauswart) recognised Juliane Plambeck from a "wanted poster". Although the rent had been paid in advance up to February 1978, the apartment had appeared uninhabited since November 1977. Details of her involvement in the Vienna kidnapping remain vague, but Rollnick was evidently "of continuing interest" to the West German authorities. Rollnik herself seems never to have told the authorities very much about the Palmers kidnapping. However, after she had finally been found and arrested, a trial took place in 1980/81, in the course of which evidence was provided by prosecutors of lengthy police interviews and judicial investigations involving local accomplices, recruited and employed in Vienna by the West German kidnappers. From this evidence it became apparent that a trio of women Inge Viett, Gabriele Rollnik and Juliane Plambeck, had all participated prominently in carrying out the kidnap conspiracy. In 1977, however, she remained "at liberty", operating underground with other group members.

The success of the Vienna kidnapping having lifted their financial challenges, the group nevertheless found themselves under intensifying pressure from the security authorities, shaken by the succession of terrorist atrocities that dominated the news agenda for much of 1977. There was discussion of finding new objectives. One response to the pressures would have been for the 2 June Movement to move closer to the Red Army Faction, or even for the two groups to implement a strategic merger. In the discussions within the 2 June Movement, Rollnik, who had got to know Monika Berberich in the context of their 1976 jail escape, was a backer of such a move, but despite major organisational "restructuring" during 1977/78 to take account of the group's changing circumstances, a merger with the RAF did not occur at this point. Nevertheless, Rollnick later insisted that informally the various West German terror groups at large during the 1970s were far less isolated from one another than expert commentators in the mainstream media had implied.

Extracting comrades from prisons remained a top priority, and on 27 May 1978 Rollnik was involved in another jail break, this time from the outside. The escaping prisoner was her old lodger-lover, Till Meyer, who was liberated from the Berlin-Moabit prison in an operation that "involved at least one P38 pistol, fitted with a silencer, and a Polish-made PM-63 machine-pistol". Till Meyer received a visit from "his lawyers" - actually a group member called Angelika Goder - with an assistant, using false identity documents and apparently with the weapons concealed on their persons. Minutes later the lawyers left with their client. A prison officer was shot in the leg during the course of Meyer's escape. The "lawyers" had arrived with a driver: Gabriele Rollnik drove the getaway car, identified by the license plate "B-AN 8482" - a Berlin registration. Pressure on the police to find Meyer and the terrorist comrades who had helped him escape was overwhelming: Meyer, Rollnick and two others discussed further moves, and decided to travel to Palestine where they "had contacts" and wanted to "get military training". There being no direct flights from East Berlin to Palestine, they traveled via Bulgaria. A couple of weeks later, in a "cloak and dagger operation", Till Meyer, Gabriele Rollnik, Gudrun Stürmer and Angelika Goder were arrested at a cafe in the port city of Burgas following a tip-off. The terrorist suspects tried to apply for political asylum, but the Bulgarian officials refused to talk to them. Instead they were handed over to West German officials. The next day, expelled by the Bulgarians, they were flown back to West Germany with Lufthansa, the national airline. As they boarded their flight in Bulgaria Günther Scheicher, the officer in charge of the West German officials responsible for their transport arrangements, called out cheerfully "Heim ins Reich!" ("Home to the Reich"), using colloquial language that recalled Germany's twelve years under Hitler. "Probably a former Nazi", Rollnick speculated when she recalled the repatriation more than three decades later.

Facing trial in Berlin just 26 days after Meyer's daring escape, the four defendants were immediately charged with membership of a terrorist organisation, which on a conviction could lead to a prison term of up to ten years. Further charges, relating to the various high profile 2 June Movement terrorist outrages of the previous few years were then added. Other terrorist suspects had been captured nearly two years earlier and were already on trial on another floor of the court building in respect of some of the same offences, which led to procedural complications. It was estimated early in 1980 that the "largest and most wide-ranging terrorist trial to date" would last two or three years. The court room building had been prepared with a range of physical barriers and devices to prevent the accused from staging any more dramatic escapes, and fifty police officers were deployed in permanent readiness for any unplanned disturbances while the trial was under way. Lawyers for the accused saw their endless procedural objections summarily dismissed, while it became clear that those on trial had not volunteered much information to the prosecutors. Attempts to show that Rollnik had personally been present in the escape attempt that had cost the Berlin court president Günter von Drenkmann his life ran into difficulties, but where there were gaps in the evidence the prosecutors applied notions of joint culpability: regardless of whether or not she had personally killed anyone, forensic (and circumstantial) evidence was cumulatively presented whereby Rollnik was depicted as one of the movement's more strategic leaders, and actively involved in the atrocities described. In 1981 Gabriele Rollnik was sentenced to a fifteen year jail term.

=== Later years ===
During her time in prison Rollnick took part in six hunger strikes. The objective was to secure improved treatment and conditions, and from experience the inmates found that up to a point it worked. In the end, she began to hallucinate and "hear voices". After her release she suffered continuing problems with vision and balance which she attributed to the hunger strikes. One concession apparently resulting from a hunger strike involved prisoners being permitted to talk by telephone to convicted terrorists in other prisons. While Rollnick was in prison she first spoke to Karl-Heinz Dellwo, a Red Army Faction member. (While they were in jail the RAF and 2 June Movement finally agreed to merge.) She was released in 1992 and the two remained in contact, although Dellwo remained in jail for another three years. They came face to face in 1995 on a river boat on the Elbe that had been rented for seven hours to host a "release party" of approximately 200 left-wingers who had been extremist activists during the 1970s and were now coming to the end of their prison sentences. Rollnick and Dellwo subsequently teamed up and have been together since that time.

One of the concerns that had fuelled the terrorist wave that hit West Germany in the 1970s was a conviction that far too many former Nazis had quietly returned to positions of power and influence in the political and security establishments, and other fulcra of state power. By the time the surviving terrorists had served their lengthy sentences, the passage of time had removed most of these. Reunification meant that after 1990 there was no longer an alternative German model for those who favoured Soviet-sponsored "Socialism" over US-sponsored "Capitalism". For this, and other reasons, there seems never to have been any question of a return to lawlessness following release. Instead, building on the university studies that she had not competed, Rollnick turned to care and social work. Her first regular job involved employment as a care worker in a retirement home. After a year, helped by a friend, she found a job in a children's home in Hamburg's traditionally run-down St. Pauli district. During five years working here, she resumed her studies, gaining a qualification in psychotherapy for children and young people, and later (finally) graduating with a degree in social sciences.
