= Renate Riemeck =

German politician and historian (1920–2003)

Renate Riemeck (4 October 1920 – 12 May 2003) was a German historian and Christian peace activist who became known as former foster parent of the famous journalist and left-wing militant Ulrike Meinhof.

As a young woman, she joined the "Christian Community" (Christengemeinschaft), an anthroposophical denomination founded by a group of evangelical theologians in Switzerland in 1922 and which was banned in Germany in 1941. After the war, she was among the millions who relocated away from the center and east of Germany, moving to Oldenburg, where she worked in teacher training, herself authoring one of the first democratic school text books of the period. In 1946, she joined the Social Democratic Party of Germany (SPD). In 1960, she was among the founders of the German Peace Union (DFU).

In the early 1940s, while living at Jena, Riemeck befriended the newly widowed Dr Ingeborg Meinhof, moving in with the Meinhof family as a lodger. After the war, with Jena in the Soviet occupation zone, the Meinhofs moved with her to Oldenburg where, following Ingeborg Meinhof's death from cancer in 1949, Riemeck formally became guardian to her friend's two orphaned children, one of whom, Ulrike Meinhof, would subsequently gain notoriety as a leading member of the Red Army Faction.

== See also ==
- List of peace activists

== Sources and further reading ==
Renate Riemeck: Ich bin ein Mensch für mich. Aus einem unbequemen Leben. Stuttgart : Urachhaus, 2. Aufl. 1994. ISBN 3-87838-934-5
