= The Murder of Andreas Baader =

1978 painting by Odd Nerdrum

- Artist: Odd Nerdrum
- Year: 1977–1978
- Medium: Oil on canvas
- Dimensions: 324 cm × 262 cm (128 in × 103 in)
- Location: Astrup Fearnley Museum of Modern Art; Oslo

The Murder of Andreas Baader (Norwegian: Mordet på Andreas Baader) is a 1978 painting by the Norwegian artist Odd Nerdrum. It depicts the speculative murder of Andreas Baader, one of the leaders of the far-left organisation Red Army Faction, in the Stammheim Prison in 1977.

The painting is in the collections of the Astrup Fearnley Museum of Modern Art, in Oslo.

== Description ==
Andreas Baader is partially naked in his cell in the Stammheim Prison. Two men hold Baader while a third lies beaten on the floor before him. A fourth man in trenchcoat executes Baader with a gun shot to the back of the neck. The men are positioned in the shape of a St Andrew's Cross. The composition and chiaroscuro are inspired by Baroque art, with associations to Caravaggio's Crucifixion of Saint Peter.

== Creation ==
Baader had died on 18 October 1977 in what became known as the Stammheim "Death Night", when also Gudrun Ensslin and Jan-Carl Raspe died. In the official version they committed suicide, but rumours and theories spread quickly that they had been murdered by secret agents. Nerdrum was an anarchist at the time he made the painting. He later described his attraction to the Baader-Meinhof group: "What particularly fascinated me was the expression of the free man that I saw in them. Otherwise I had sympathy for Baader to the extent that he was one of the many who were ready to die for their cause. To me he was the uncompromising, tragic idealist."

== Reception ==
The painting was presented at Høstutstillingen in Oslo in 1978. It immediately drew strong reactions in both Norway and Germany for its way of depicting a terrorist as a religious martyr, as well as supposing he was murdered. The painting established Nerdrum as a political voice in the Norwegian public discourse.
