= Harry Dahl (homeland security) =

East German police officer

Harry Dahl is a former East German police officer who switched to homeland security in 1956. Within the Ministry for State Security hierarchy he achieved rapid promotion, reaching the rank of “colonel”. Between 1975 and 1985 he was in charge at the service's “Department XXII”, a specialist section dealing with counter-terrorism. After 1990 he came to wider attention with the discovery that he had been centrally engaged in highly secret collaboration between East German homeland security and the West German ”Red army faction” (RAF), an extreme leftist terrorist organisation active between 1970 and 1998 which was widely believed to have been responsible for over 30 murders in West Germany. Many of the key details concerning the extent and nature of Dahl's involvement in the relationship between the East German security services and the West German terrorist group remained unclear even after Dahl's trial and conviction in 1997 (and his subsequent acquittal on appeal in 1998).

== Life ==
=== Provenance and early years ===
Harry Dahl was born and grew up in Schönebeck, a small riverside town upriver from Magdeburg, some 50 miles (80 km) to the west of Berlin and to the north of Leipzig. At the time of his birth, and indeed throughout the first half of the twentieth century, the local economy was dominated by the town's extensive salt mining and processing operations, and various industrial and health-sector businesses based on them. He completed his schooling in 1945, which was also the year in which war ended together with the twelve year Hitler regime. Between 1945 and 1949 the entire region was administered as part of the Soviet occupation zone, relaunched in 1949 as the Soviet sponsored German Democratic Republic (East Germany). Between 1945 and 1948 Dahl trained for work in business administration.

An abrupt change in career direction came in 1949 when Harry Dahl, aged 20, was enrolled at the officers’ training college of the "People's Police" service. He was evidently well suited to the work, since in 1950 he became a member of the local management team for the "People's Police" in Burg bei Magdeburg. Further promotion followed in 1952 when he was appointed to a position as "stellvertretender Politkulturleiter" (loosely "deputy Head of Political Culture") within the police service.

=== Stasi ===
Dahl's transfer in 1956 to the Ministry for State Security (Stasi) at the age of 27 was a slightly unusual move, despite the shortage of a working age population in the country after World War II (due to deaths during the war and the subsequent exodus of several million East Germans who escaped to the west). It indicates that among influential party comrades he was considered to be both exceptionally competent and politically reliable. His first posting was to Frankfurt an der Oder, where he was employed by the ministry's Department III (“Hauptabteilung III: Volkswirtschaft"). Departmental responsibilities included “security related tasks” covering the whole of industry, construction and economic development, to be secured through monitoring of national institutions such as ministries and centralised services, notably in the areas of planning – especially in respect of the (intrinsically powerful) State Planning Commission – and in respect of statistics, finance and banking, supplies, trade both within East Germany and “intra-Germany” (between East and West Germany), logistical oversight, research and development, intellectual property, trades union matters and more. As an apprenticeship for a high-level career within the Stasi, Dahl's first posting was exceptionally broadly based. Between 1958 and 1960 Dahl attended the ministry's Juristische Hochschule (JHS) at Eiche-Golm (Potsdam). The name of the institution was intentionally misleading. Far from being a law college in any western sense, the JHS was a secret service training institute for senior Stasi officers. In terms of western understanding, course content was strongly ideological. The “Diplom-Jurist” qualification that Dahl received in 1960 was nevertheless classified as a Law Degree.

Within the Ministry for State Security, from 1962 Dahl was responsible for oversight of the regional military command of the People's Police in the region administered from to Frankfurt an der Oder. In 1966 he took on a new role as chief representative of the chief district administrator in respect of International Military Intelligence and reconnaissance. In 1974 he received a doctorate of laws from his alma mater, the Stasi's “Juristische Hochschule“.

That same year Dahl was appointed “Officer for Special Operations” in a working group set up by Lt. Gen. Bruno Beater, the First Deputy Minister of State Security. One indication of the importance of the special operations in questions was Dahl's promotion to the rank of a Stasi colonel in 1975. In August 1975 Harry Dahl became be the man heading up “Department XXII”. The department was a new one, and he was the first person to be placed in charge of it. The working group to which he had been assigned had been set up in 1972 as a response to the terrorist killings at the Munich Olympic Games, amid concerns that the 10th World Festival of Youth and Students, scheduled to take place in East Berlin the following year, might fall prey to a follow-up terrorist attack. Given that no follow-up terrorist attack took place in East Berlin following the 1972 Munich atrocity, it can be inferred that any anti-terrorist counter-measures set in train by Dahl were effective. The need for a permanent counter-terrorism department within the East German Ministry for State Security was nevertheless reinforced by a surge in terrorist killings in West Germany and other parts of (mainly western) Europe during the 1970s. “Department XXII” was the Stasi Department for Counter-terrorism, based in East Berlin. Following its launch in 1975 it grew steadily in terms of manpower and of reach under Harry Dahl's leadership.

=== Inge Viett ===
During the spring of 1978, Inge Viett, a member of the West German left-wing militant organisation, "2 June Movement", was returning from Italy to West Berlin via a slightly indirect route, having avoided arrest in Vienna at the conclusion of a successful kidnapping and ransom operation. Her itinerary took her through Berlin Schönefeld Airport, then in East Germany. At the airport she was approached by four officers from the Ministry for State Security who evidently knew her real identity. She was invited to participate in an impromptu meeting. Her principal interlocutor, who introduced himself as Günter, was none other than the head of “Department XXII”, Harry Dahl himself. Sources indicating that this was the first time that Stasi officers had met with leaders of leftist West German terrorist organisations are probably incorrect. The airport meeting between Dahl and Viett was nevertherless highly significant for both parties. In West Germany the security services had responded to terrorist outrages by the leftist "2 June Movement" and "Red Army Faction (RAF)" terrorist organisations by enhancing their own anti-terrorism operations. At the time when Dahl and Viett met in 1978, several escaped West German terrorists were imprisoned in Sofia, facing the threat of extradition to the west. Dahl was able to assure Viett that, despite their shared adherence to socialist ideals, there could be no question of the East German security service endorsing the terrorist methods of the RAF. Given that the East German government had signed up to the Helsinki Accords, he was officially required to arrest her without delay. But instead he offered to give her access to items of information that the Stasi had acquired through their own channels from the West German security services. Importantly, he was able to tell her which of her various aliases were known to the West German security services, and which remained secure. Dahl, almost certainly with the agreement of the East German leadership, was aware that a more collaborative relationship with the West German terrorist groups might prove of use if war were ever to break out across the Iron Curtain. More immediate operational challenges arose for the extensive network of East German spies whenever a terrorist atrocity led to a concentration of police resources on a given city quarter in the west. Advance notice of such atrocities would give any Eastern agents in the area the chance to be somewhere else while police searches were undertaken. Any such collaboration would have to be completely unofficial and everything possible must be done to conceal it from western agencies.

The initial meeting between Dahl and Viett is reported to have lasted only a couple of hours. Both of them reportedly expressed themselves with singular candour. The increasing effectiveness of anti-terrorist activity by the security services was placing the "RAF” (which during 1980 would absorb what remained of the “2 June Movement”) under significant pressure. A number of terrorist members were looking for opportunities to retire from activism. Pressure on the RAF to support the retirement goals of members came both from the habits of close co-operation and from the risk of terrorist secrets coming to the attention of the security services if bonds of comradely loyalty were ever be broken. Clearly if terrorists were to retire within West Germany the danger that they might subsequently be subjected to investigation was intensified. Viett took the opportunity of the unexpected meeting with Dahl to seek practical support from the East German security services. She had a somewhat incomplete idea that a remote retirement destination for former terrorists might be found in “Black Africa”. Viett herself had travelled extensively in North Africa in the years before she became a notorious terrorist suspect, and more recently she had on more than one occasion found a safe haven from the West German security services beyond Africa, in a Palestinian terrorist training camp in South Yemen. From Dahl's perspective her appreciation of the possibilities for creating permanent retirement homes for pink-skinned ex-terrorists with German accents in ”Black Africa” were hopelessly impractical. It was Dahl who suggested that a better alternative might be for the terrorists to retire to East Germany. The idea had evidently not occurred to Viett: she was not instantly persuaded. But following further discussion Dahl's remarkable offer was accepted. The exercise would involve new identities for the individuals involved, but they would be protected from the risk of arrest by western agencies. Creating new identities and scrupulously coaching people down to the tiniest detail how they might convincingly inhabit new selves involved sets of skills that were at the heart of the surveillance activities in which the Stasi specialised. The number of former terrorists on Viett's list initially stood at 8, but in the end, during the early 1980s 10 former terrorists were spirited across to East Germany, coached in their new identities and successfully concealed from western agencies for nearly a decade.

=== Reunification ===
The arrangement came to an end in the context of changes which lead to the creation of a series of expanding gaps in the Berlin Wall by street protesters in November 1989, while East German police and Soviet troops watched, uncertain what to do, and in the absence of any orders to intervene. By the end of 1989 many of the institutions of the East German dictatorship had disappeared or were in the process of dissolving from within. That included the Ministry for State security. In March 1990 the German Democratic Republic held its first and last free and fair general election as a stand-alone state. For what remained of the homeland security services, East and West Germany were now on the same side and relations rapidly became collaborative. On 6 June 1990 Susanne Albrecht became the first of the former retired West German terrorist who had found refuge in East Germany to be unmasked and arrested. Inge Viett herself was arrested on 12 June 1990 as she returned home to her Magdeburg apartment. A neighbour had taken advantage of the newly available opportunities to travel to the west, and had spotted Viett's face on a “terrorists wanted” poster on display at Frankfurt Station (Frankfurt a/M Hbf). Facial disguises and hair colour changes could not entirely compensate for the scar on Viett's right index finger of which neighbours would have been aware, and which the description on the poster spelled out with teutonic precision. Most of the former western terrorists found in East Germany faced prosecution, conviction and jail terms following reunification which was formalised in October 1990. There was a perception which has endured among commentators that the sentences handed down were curiously mild under the (known) circumstances.

=== Criminal investigation and trial ===
Dahl was the most senior of four high-ranking Stasi officers to face a lengthy criminal investigation in connection with the retired western terrorists who had been concealed in East Germany through the 1980s. (The others were Günter Jäckel, Hans Petzold and Gerd Zaumseil.) The trial opened in Berlin towards the end of February in 1997. Harry Dahl and his three co-accused sat together, petrified, in court. Judge Peter Faust presided. On Friday 7 March 1997, the court delivered its verdict. During the intervening two weeks the moods of the four accused and the atmosphere in the court had been transformed. To be sure, Dahl had made the best of his case. He had unhesitatingly co-operated with investigators in respect of details they already knew, while scrupulously avoiding providing any enlightenment where they were unsure of their ground. At no time, he insisted, had the East German security services done anything to support or retrospectively legitimize any terrorist attacks. Their interest in the terrorist groups was based solely on the way in which every major terrorist attack stirred up a hornet's nest of police activity which disrupted intelligence gathering for agents from the east. Dahl pointed out to the court that by keeping dangerous terrorists safely hidden away in East Germany, he was supporting western comrades by ensuring that these experienced malefactors were not available to inflict further carnage on West German streets. “Jailing them [for their crimes] would have led to further attacks [by their friends], so the eastern security services had simply, by keeping them out of the way “closed the vicious circle”. Dahl himself had done what he had done secure in the knowledge, based on assurance from his seniors, that his actions were undertaken in full compliance with (otherwise undisclosed) detailed understandings between the East German leader Erich Honecker and the West German chancellor of those times, Helmut Schmidt. As everyone already knew, Honecker was not available for comment, having died in exile in 1994. Helmut Schmidt was still very much alive, but the court rejected a prosecution application that he should be summoned to testify, on the grounds that the matter was “not important”. Schmidt was frequently happy to share political insights with journalists, but on this occasion press attempts to quiz him were met with the bland statement from the former chancellor's office that he was away on vacation and could not be contacted. By the time the court delivered its verdict, it appeared from the transformation in Dahl's bearing that behind the scenes agreements had been reached. The defence legal team did not dispute known facts but naturally called for leniency on behalf of their clients. Rumours were already circulating that western intelligence had become aware of the western terrorists concealed in East Germany during the middle 1980s, but had been advised not to pursue the matter by their political masters.

The sentencing, when it came, was indeed at the milder end of what might have been expected. The judge in his summing up was critical of many aspects of the defence case, but the only charge on which the court felt able to deliver a “guilty” verdict was that of “versuchten Strafvereitelung”, whereby it was accepted that three of accused, including Dahl, had attempted to obstruct justice, in that they sought to avert a criminal prosecution for a group of people whom the judge characterised as “Rotte ausgeflippter Bürgerskinder” (‘’loosely, “a gaggle of crazy middle class kids”’’). The court accepted that regardless of considerations of relevant jurisdictions and perceived illegalities, the defendants probably had contributed indirectly to the avoidance of further serious crimes that could otherwise have taken place if the ex-terrorists had remained at large in West Germany. Harry Dahl ended up with a fine of DM 3,750 (calibrated according to his declared income). However, the defence lawyers had already announced that they would appeal any verdict, and it was thought likely that the prosecutor would probably do the same following sentencing. No fine would be payable until the appeal process had been concluded. The appeal hearing duly took place at the High Court in 1998. The guilty verdicts that Dahl and his two co-defendants had received at the Berlin district court the previous year were reversed on all counts. It is not clear that the trial of Harry Dahl sought or reached a full answer to the questions that it purported to address. It is, in addition, important to note that there were other wider questions regarding Dahl's involvement in links between the East German Ministry for State Security and West German terrorism in the 1970s and 1980s that remained completely outside the remit of the court hearings. Outside the legal system, researchers persist, however.
