= Peter O. Chotjewitz =

German writer, translator and lawyer (1934–2010)

- Born: 14 June 1934; Berlin, Germany
- Died: 15 December 2010 (aged 76); Stuttgart, Germany

Peter Otto Chotjewitz (14 June 1934 – 15 December 2010) was a German writer, translator and lawyer.

== Biography ==
Born in Schöneberg, Berlin to a Jewish family, Chotjewitz made his debut as a writer in the mid-1960s with experimental works, before achieving his breakthrough in the second half of the 1970s with some politically engaged and often controversial novels. He was also very active as a translator of Italian authors, including Leonardo Sciascia, Dario Fo, Giuseppe Fava, Luciano Canfora, and Nanni Balestrini.

Also a lawyer, he served as a defense counsel for terrorist Andreas Baader.
