= Irene Goergens =

German militant

- Born: 29 April 1951 (age 75)
- Years active: 1970–1977

Irene Goergens (born 29 April 1951) is a former member of the West German militant group, the Red Army Faction (RAF).

In March 1971 she was sentenced to 6 1/2 years in prison for her role in the prison escape of Andreas Baader in May 1970.

== Life ==
Irene Goergens was born to an American G.I. and a German woman out of wedlock. She grew up in Eichenhof Youth Custody Home in Berlin. At this home she met Ulrike Meinhof, who interviewed her during the production of her film Bambule; one of the characters of the film is called Irene. Later, Goergens looked after Meinhof's daughters as a nanny.

In 1970 Goergens joined the Baader-Meinhof-Gruppe, which carried out terrorist attacks from 1971 as the Rote Armee Fraktion (known in English as the Red Army Faction).

Goergens played a decisive role in Andreas Baader's escape from custody on 14 May 1970. She and Astrid Proll procured weapons for the escape, and spied on the German Central Institute for Social Issues in order to guarantee that the operation went smoothly.

During the escape, Goergens, Meinhof and Schubert entered the library of the prison in which Baader was being housed under the pretense of a false "book deal". Goergens and Schubert entered carrying suitcases, then opened a door to admit a masked gunman into the room. They then drew pistols out of their suitcases, firing shots which wounded a 64-year-old librarian. Baader, the masked gunman and the three women then fled through a window.

On 29 September 1970, Goergens took part in a bank robbery in Berlin, which became known as the "Dreierschlag" ("Triple Strike" in English). On 8 October 1970. Goergens was arrested at an apartment in Berlin, along with RAF lawyer Horst Mahler and RAF members Brigitte Asdonk, Monika Berberich and Ingrid Schubert. Goergens' trial began on 1 March 1971, and in May 1971 she was sentenced to 6 1/2 years imprisonment for her participation in the escape of Baader. She was released from prison on 13 May 1977, after which she was no longer active in the RAF.

== See also ==
- Red Army Faction (RAF)
- Andreas Baader
