= NPD ban proceedings =

Attempt to ban a German political party

On January 30, 2001, the German Federal Government under chancellor Gerhard Schröder instructed the Federal Constitutional Court to investigate the National Democratic Party of Germany (NPD), with the goal of achieving a ban on the party. On March 30, 2001, the German Bundestag and Bundesrat followed with their own ban proposals.

The proceedings were discontinued by the Federal Constitutional Court on March 18, 2003, for procedural reasons: So called "V-Leute", confidential informants of German intelligence agencies, turned out to be active in the leadership of the party. Following this, the question of whether the NPD is an unconstitutional party was not further examined.

There were further failed attempts to ban the (NPD) in 2012 and 2016.

== 2000s ==
=== Initiative ===
The initiative for banning the National Democratic Party largely came from the Bavarian Minister of the Interior, Günther Beckstein, who initially requested action to be taken in August 2000. Momentum for the matter was created after a series of attacks with partly suspected and partly proven xenophobic backgrounds. A bomb attack on a group of Jewish immigrants from Russia on July 27, 2000, played a special role: Although the crime remained unsolved, xenophobic motives were suspected. Voices calling for a ban on the NPD grew louder among all major German political parties except the FDP, which feared the motion would fail.

=== Justification for the ban ===
The ban applications were comprehensively justified by the involved governmental bodies, the federal government, federal council and the federal parliament. A detailed analysis of the reasons of the ban instantly provoked doubt about its feasibility: The evidence presented against the NPD and its officials was limited to the accusation of anti-constitutional propaganda, in particular, incitement to hatred. More serious crimes, particularly the use of violence or its preparation, could only be attributed to the party in a few cases.

=== Domestic Intelligence Agency involvement and scandal ===
The ban proceedings grew into a scandal when suspicions arose that the North Rhine-Westphalian division of the far right extremist NPD was actually controlled by informants of the German Domestic Intelligence Agency. NPD’s state chairman Udo Holtmann and his deputy Wolfgang Frenz were exposed as such informants, which are colloquially called "V-Männer" (from "Verbindungs-Männer", german for "contact men"). The allegations of the party’s unconstitutionality heavily relied on quotes and statements from the aforementioned confidential informants as proof. The affair also triggered criticism of the recruitment and utilisation of such informants in other cases.

=== Court case ===
The Federal Constitutional Court had to clarify the influence of undercover investigators of the Domestic Intelligence Agency in a hearing in October 2002. The applicants refused to provide the court with the names of the informants. Moreover, minister of the interior Otto Schily declared that there had been no controlling of the NPD through employees of the Domestic Intelligence Agency.

On March 18, 2003, the Federal Constitutional Court announced that the ban proceedings would not be continued. The decision was based on the hearing in October, where three out of five members of the court ruled that the undercover informants were a critical obstacle to the proceedings. The remaining judges wanted to clarify the extent to which the Domestic Intelligence Agency had influenced the public image of the NPD, suggesting the topic should be dealt with only in the main court case. In Germany, party bans require a two-thirds majority in the Federal Constitutional Court, leading to the discontinuation of the case until its second iteration in 2012.

== 2010s ==
=== 2012-2013 ===
German officials tried to outlaw the party again in December 2012, with the interior ministers of all 16 states recommending a ban. The Federal Constitutional Court is yet to vote on the recommendation. In March 2013 the Merkel government said it would not try to ban the NPD.

=== 2016-2017 ===
German officials again tried to outlaw the NPD by submitting a request to the Federal Constitutional Court in 2016.

On 17 January 2017, the second senate of the Federal Constitutional Court rejected the attempt to outlaw the party. The reasoning behind the decision was that the NPD's political significance is virtually nonexistent at both the state and federal levels and that as such, the party had no chance of posing a significant threat to the constitutional order. It was also reasoned that outlawing the party would not change the mindset and political ideology of its members and supporters, who in the event of a ban could simply form a new movement under a different name. However, the Court also openly acknowledged that NPD is unconstitutional based on its manifesto and ideology, citing "links to neo-Nazism" and that "anti-semitism was a structural element of the party ideology" in its reasoning. The Court also indirectly suggested that state grants or other financial contributions should not be given to such parties to further their unconstitutional cause. This prompted calls by the public for the proposal of a constitutional amendment which would forbid unconstitutional parties' financing to the Basic Law for the Federal Republic of Germany. The proposal was criticized by the interior policy spokesman of Die Linke, who claimed that such a constitutional amendment could stand to serve as a politically dubious way to remove a political opponent. Constitutional law professor Hans Herbert von Arnim warned that such a constitutional amendment would apply to all extra-parliamentary parties, not just the NPD.

The German legislative bodies then created the possibility of a funding freeze for parties after the second NPD ban procedure failed in 2017. In 2019, the Bundestag, Bundesrat and federal government jointly submitted a proposal to exclude the NPD from state funding. In January 2024 the Federal Constitutional Court allowed the freezing of state funding for six years, saying that the party "aimed to undermine or eliminate the country's democratic system".

== See also ==
- Prohibited political parties in Germany
