= Andreas Baader =

German far-left militant leader (1943–1977)

- Baader at the time of his imprisonment in Stuttgart-Stammheim
- Born: Berndt Andreas Baader; 6 May 1943; Munich, Nazi Germany
- Died: 18 October 1977 (aged 34); Stuttgart, West Germany
- Organization: Red Army Faction

Berndt Andreas Baader (6 May 1943 – 18 October 1977) was a West German communist and leader of the far-left organization Red Army Faction (RAF), also commonly known as the Baader-Meinhof Group.

== Life ==
Andreas Baader was born in Munich on 6 May 1943. He was the only child of historian and archivist Berndt Phillipp Baader and Anneliese Hermine "Nina" (Kröcher). Andreas was raised by his mother, aunt, and grandmother. Phillipp Baader served in the Wehrmacht, was captured on the Russian Front in 1945, and never returned.

Baader was a high school dropout and a bohemian before his involvement in the Red Army Faction. He was one of the few members of the RAF who did not attend university.

At the age of 20, Baader moved from Munich to West Berlin, allegedly to do an artistic education. He worked as a construction worker and unsuccessfully as a tabloid journalist.

Baader took part in the Schwabing riots in 1962. According to his mother, he is said to have drawn the conclusion from the actions of the police that "something was wrong" in the state. According to journalist Butz Peters, the events of the Munich city summer during 1962 were "a shocking experience for the nineteen-year-old".

== RAF involvement ==
In 1968, Baader and his girlfriend Gudrun Ensslin were convicted of the arson bombing of a department store in Frankfurt, to protest against what they described as the public's "indifference to the genocide in Vietnam".

After being sentenced, Baader and Ensslin fled in November 1969. They were smuggled out of West Germany by sympathizers and made the tour of the left-wing communities of France, Switzerland, and Italy before re-entering West Germany covertly in early 1970.

Baader was later caught at a traffic stop in Berlin for speeding on 4 April 1970. He produced a fake driver's license in the name of the author Peter Chotjewitz but was placed under arrest when he failed to answer personal questions about the names and ages of Chotjewitz's children.

Ensslin masterminded an escape plan. Journalist Ulrike Meinhof and Baader's lawyers concocted a false "book deal" in which Meinhof would interview Baader. A few weeks later, in May 1970, he was allowed to meet her at the library of the Berlin Zentralinstitut outside the prison, without handcuffs but escorted by two armed guards. Meinhof was allowed to join him. Confederates Irene Goergens and Ingrid Schubert entered the library carrying suitcases, then opened a door to admit a masked gunman armed with a pistol and then drew pistols out of suitcases. They then fired shots that wounded a 64-year-old librarian, hitting him in his liver. Baader, the masked gunman, and the three women then fled through a window.

The group became known as the Baader-Meinhof Group. Baader and others then spent some time in a Fatah military training camp in Jordan before being expelled due to "differences in attitudes". Back in West Germany, Baader robbed banks and bombed buildings from 1970 to 1972. Although he never obtained a driver's licence, Baader was obsessed with driving. He regularly stole expensive sports cars for use by the gang and was arrested driving an Iso Rivolta IR 300.

On 1 June 1972, Baader and fellow RAF members Jan-Carl Raspe and Holger Meins were apprehended after a lengthy shootout in Frankfurt.

== Stammheim ==
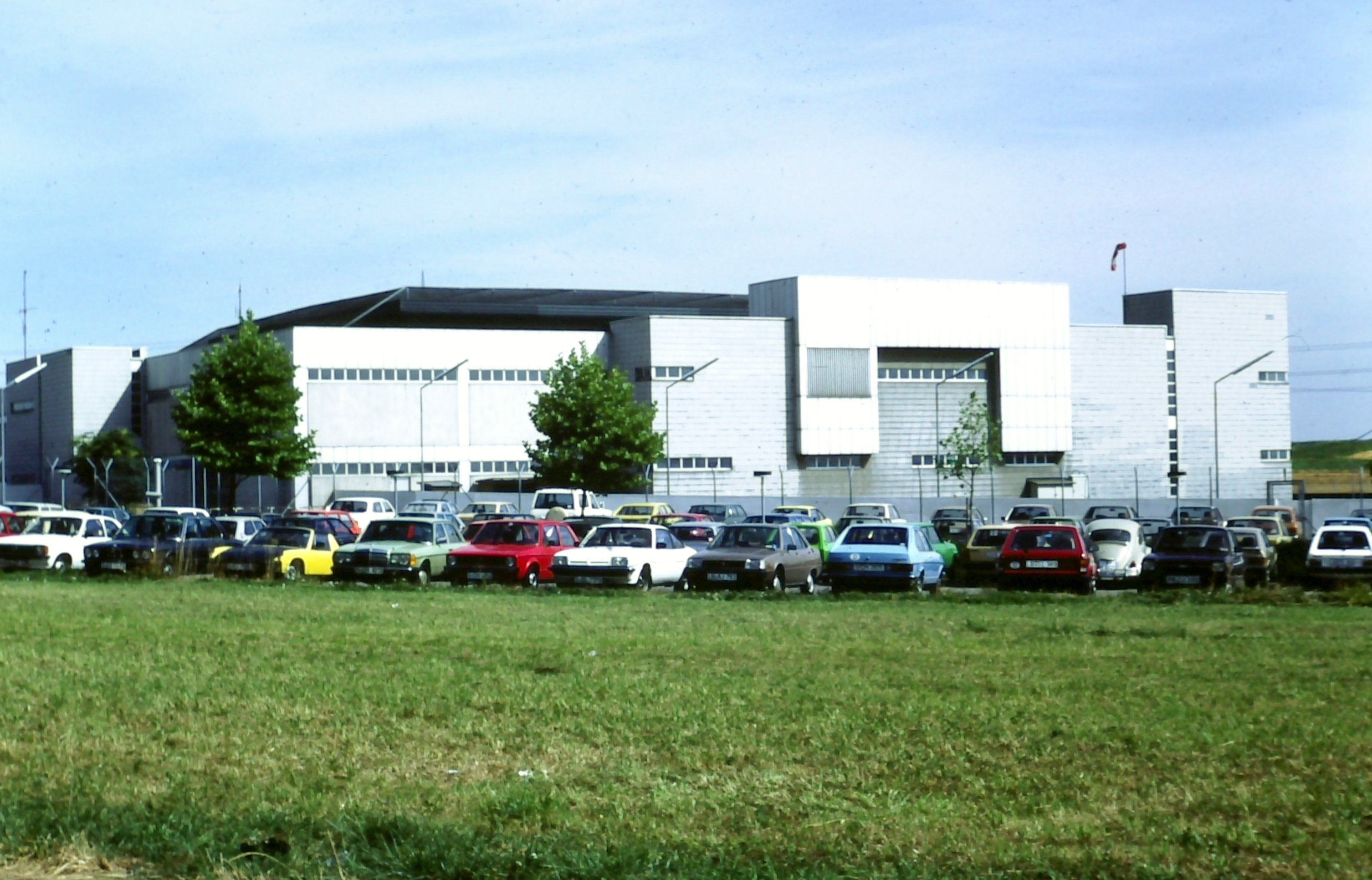
Stammheim Prison, photographed in 1982

From 1975 to 1977, a long and expensive trial took place in a fortified building on the grounds of Stuttgart's Stammheim Prison. As a precaution against items being smuggled in, all prisoners were strip-searched and inspected and given new clothes before and after meeting lawyers.

During a collective hunger strike in 1974, which led to the death of Meins, philosopher Jean-Paul Sartre visited Baader in Stammheim where he was being held. He allegedly described Baader after the meeting as being a "twat" ("Quel con!"). Although he did not like Baader's behavior, he criticized the harsh conditions of imprisonment Baader endured.

Meinhof was found dead in her cell at Stuttgart-Stammheim on 9 May 1976, hanging from the grating covering her cell window. Members of the Red Army Faction and others claimed that she was killed by the German authorities. The second generation of the RAF committed several kidnappings and attacks in a campaign in support of their comrades.

The three remaining defendants were convicted in April 1977 of several murders, attempted murders, and of forming a terrorist organization, and were sentenced to life imprisonment.

Militants tried to force the release of Baader and ten other imprisoned RAF members by kidnapping former Nazi SS official Hanns Martin Schleyer in Cologne on 5 September 1977, as part of the sequence of events known as the "German Autumn", which began on 30 July 1977 with the murder of banker Jürgen Ponto.

On 6 September 1977, an official statement was released in which the state declared that the prisoners would not be released under any circumstances, and on the same day a Kontaktsperre ("communication ban") was enacted against all RAF prisoners. This order deprived prisoners of all contact with each other as well as with the outside; all visits, including those of lawyers and family members, were forbidden. The prisoners were deprived of their access to post, newspapers, magazines, television, and radio. The official justification for this was a claim by the state that the prisoners had supervised Schleyer's kidnapping from their cells with the assistance of their lawyers. It was claimed that a hand-drawn map had been found which had been used in the kidnapping in Newerla's car on 5 September. On 10 September, the prisoners' lawyers lost their appeal against the Kontaktsperre order and on 2 October it became effective. On 18 October 1977, the RAF killed Schleyer in France.

On 13 October 1977 four members of the Popular Front for the Liberation of Palestine hijacked Lufthansa Flight 181 on a flight from Palma de Mallorca to Frankfurt, their leader demanding the release of the eleven RAF prisoners detained at Stammheim. The aircraft was eventually flown to Mogadishu, Somalia, where it arrived in the early hours of 17 October. The passengers of the Boeing 737 were freed in an assault carried out by German GSG 9 special forces in the early hours of 18 October 1977 which saw the death of three of the militants.

== Death ==
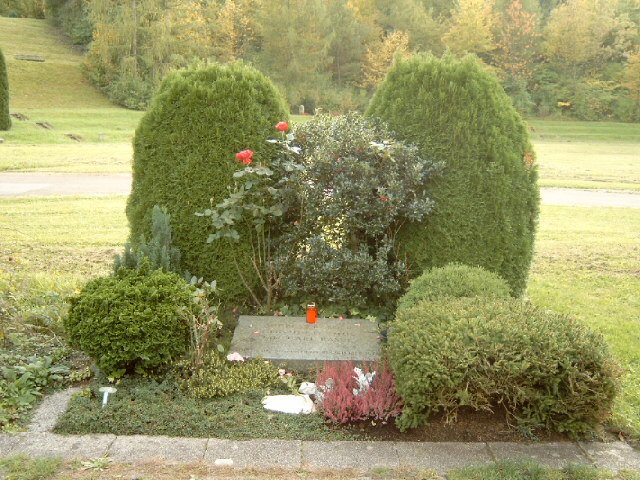
Burial site of Baader, Raspe and Ensslin in Stuttgart

According to official accounts of his death, Raspe learned about GSG 9's success in ending the hijacking on a smuggled transistor radio and spent the next few hours talking to Baader, Ensslin, and Möller over a theorized inter-cell communications system, where they agreed to a suicide pact. In the morning, Baader and Raspe were found dead in their cells, having died from gunshot wounds, while Ensslin was found hanging from a noose made from the speaker wire. RAF member Irmgard Möller was found with four stab wounds to her chest, but survived.

All official inquiries on the matter concluded that Baader and his two accomplices died by collective suicide, and Baader-Meinhof biographer Stefan Aust argued in the original edition of his book, The Baader-Meinhof Group (1985), that they did kill themselves. But there was a controversy about the weapons they used to commit suicide.

Aspects of the deaths have been debated: Baader was supposed to have shot himself in the base of the neck so that the bullet exited through his forehead; repeated tests indicated that it was virtually impossible for a person to hold and fire a gun in such a way. In addition, three bullet holes were found in his cell: one lodged in the wall, one in the mattress, and the fatal bullet itself lodged in the floor, suggesting that Baader had fired twice before killing himself. Finally, Baader, who was left-handed, had powder burns on his right hand. Raspe showed no signs of powder burns.

The theory itself that guns had been smuggled into Stammheim depended on the testimony of Hans Joachim Dellwo (brother of prisoner Karl-Heinz Dellwo) and Volker Speitel (husband of Angelika Speitel). Both had been arrested on 2 October 1977, and charged with belonging to a criminal association; under pressure from the police, they subsequently became crown witnesses and admitted to acting as couriers and testified that they were aware of lawyers smuggling items to the prisoners during the trial. In consideration of this testimony, authorities reduced their sentences and provided them with new identities. In 1979, two defence attorneys were tried and convicted for smuggling weapons. However, as noted above, the lawyers had been unable to meet with their clients after 6 September 1977 due to the Kontaktsperre order.

=== Study of brain ===
Following their apparent suicides, the German government had the brains of Baader, Meinhof, Ensslin and Raspe removed for study at the Neurological Research Institute at the University of Tübingen. Meinhof's brain contained scar tissue, the result of surgery to remove a benign tumor in 1962, that could have affected her behavior. The results of the study of the others' brains are not known. Aside from the removal of his brain, a death mask was made of Baader. The brains of all but Meinhof have apparently been lost and cannot be accounted for by German authorities.

== Cultural depictions ==
- The Murder of Andreas Baader is a 1978 painting by Odd Nerdrum where Baader is depicted as a murder victim.
- Stammheim – Die Baader-Meinhof-Gruppe vor Gericht ("Stammheim – The Baader-Meinhof Gang on Trial") (1986) a film directed by Reinhard Hauff; with Ulrich Tukur in the role of Andreas Baader; after the book by Stefan Aust. It won the Golden Bear at the 1986 Berlin Film Festival.
- Death Game (1997) is a TV docudrama by Heinrich Breloer; with Sebastian Koch as Andreas Baader. It is about the kidnapping and later the assassination of Bundesvereinigung der Deutschen Arbeitgeberverbändeunion (BDA) president Hanns-Martin Schleyer.
- In 2002, director Christopher Roth released the film Baader, with Frank Giering in the title role. It covers the period between 1967 and 1972.
- Baader was portrayed by Moritz Bleibtreu in the film The Baader Meinhof Complex, also based on the book by Stefan Aust. The film was nominated for the 2009 foreign language film Oscar.

== See also ==
- Baader–Meinhof effect, a cognitive bias named after Baader

== Sourcing ==
- Aust, Stefan (2009). Baader-Meinhof: The Inside Story of the R.A.F. Oxford: Oxford University Press. ISBN 978-0-19-537275-5.
- Moxon-Browne, Edward, ed. (1993). European Terrorism. Aldershot: Dartmouth. ISBN 978-1-85521-500-9.
- Eager, Paige Whaley (2016). From Freedom Fighters to Terrorists: Women and Political Violence. Aldershot, England: Ashgate. ISBN 978-0-7546-8975-1.
- Bielby, Clare (2012). Violent Women in Print: Representations in the West German Print Media of the 1960s and 1970s. Rochester, New York: Camden House. ISBN 978-1-57113-530-8.
- Küng, Hans (2014). Disputed Truth: Memoirs. Vol. 2. London: Bloomsbury Publishing. ISBN 978-1-4729-1098-1.
- Atkins, Stephen E. (2004). Encyclopedia of Modern Worldwide Extremists and Extremist Groups. Westport, Connecticut: Greenwood Publishing Group. ISBN 978-0-313-32485-7.
- Smith, J.; Moncourt, André (2008). Daring to Struggle, Failing to Win: The Red Army Faction's 1977 Campaign of Desperation. Oakland, California: PM Press. ISBN 978-1-60486-028-3.
- Dornberg, John (1976). The New Germans: Thirty Years After. New York: Macmillan. ISBN 978-0-02-532170-0.
- Chalk, Peter (2013). Encyclopedia of Terrorism. Santa Barbara, California: ABC-CLIO. ISBN 978-0-313-30895-6.
- Post, Jerrold M. (2007). The Mind of the Terrorist: The Psychology of Terrorism from the IRA to al-Qaeda. New York: St. Martin's Publishing Group. ISBN 978-0-230-60859-7.
- Martin, Gus (2011). The SAGE Encyclopedia of Terrorism (Second ed.). Thousand Oaks, California: SAGE Publications. ISBN 978-1-4522-6638-1.
- Neu, Guido (2010). Hinter Schloß und Riegel: Erinnerungen eines Anstaltsleiters (in German). Norderstedt: BoD – Books on Demand GmBH. ISBN 978-3-925818-23-3.
