= Ulrike Meinhof =

German left-wing militant, journalist and author (1934–1976)

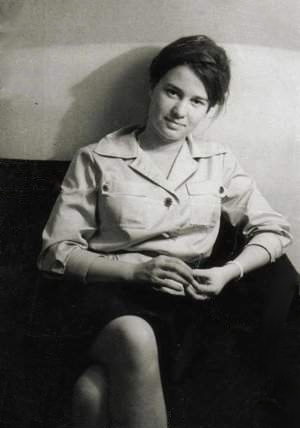
- Meinhof as a journalist, c. 1964
- Born: Ulrike Marie Meinhof; 7 October 1934; Oldenburg, Nazi Germany
- Died: 9 May 1976 (aged 41); Stuttgart, West Germany
- Cause of death: Suicide (hanging, although rejected by RAF)
- Organization: Red Army Faction
- Spouse: Klaus Rainer Röhl (divorced)
- Children: Regine; Bettina

Ulrike Marie Meinhof (German pronunciation: [ʊlˈʁiːkə maˈʁiː ˈmaɪnhoːf]; 7 October 1934 – 9 May 1976) was a German left-wing militant, journalist, author and founding member of the Red Army Faction (RAF) in West Germany, commonly referred to in the press as the "Baader-Meinhof gang". She is the reputed author of The Urban Guerilla Concept (1971). The manifesto acknowledges the RAF's "roots in the history of the student movement"; condemns "reformism" as "a brake on the anti-capitalist struggle"; and invokes Mao Zedong to define "armed struggle" as "the highest form of Marxism-Leninism".

Meinhof, who took part in the RAF's "May Offensive" in 1972, was arrested that June and spent the rest of her life in custody, largely isolated from outside contact. In November 1974, she was sentenced to 8 years in prison for complicity in a near-fatal shooting in what had been her first RAF operation, the successful jailbreak of Andreas Baader in 1970.

From 1975, with Baader and two other RAF leaders, Gudrun Ensslin and Jan-Carl Raspe, she stood trial on further charges of murder and attempted murder. Before the end of the trial, she was found hanged in her cell in the Stammheim Prison. The official finding of suicide sparked controversy, with her sister, Wienke Zitzlaff, stating that Meinhof had told her only days before her death: "You can stand up and fight only while you are alive. If they say I committed suicide, be sure that it was murder."

One year later, on 7 April 1977, two members of the RAF assassinated the Federal Attorney-General Siegfried Buback as revenge.

== Early life ==
Meinhof was born in 1934 in Oldenburg. Her father Werner Meinhof, a curator of Jena Museum, died of cancer in 1940, causing her mother to take in a boarder, Renate Riemeck, to make money. In 1946, the family moved back to Oldenburg after Jena fell under Soviet occupation as a result of the Yalta agreement. Meinhof's mother, Ingeborg Meinhof, an art historian, began to work as a teacher and died from cancer in 1949. Riemeck took on the role of guardian of Meinhof and her elder sister, Wienke.

=== Student activist 1950s ===
In 1952, Meinhof took her Abitur at a school in Weilburg. She then studied philosophy, sociology, education and German at Marburg, where she became involved with reform movements. In 1957, she transferred to the University of Münster, where she met the Spanish Marxist intellectual Manuel Sacristán (who later translated and edited some of her writings), joined the Sozialistischer Deutscher Studentenbund (SDS), the German Socialist Student Union. She participated in protests against the Bundeswehr and the proposal of Konrad Adenauer's government to deploy nuclear weapons. Despite her involvement, Meinhof was critical of the SDS leaders' subconscious misogyny and the organisation's marginalisation of female members. Meinhof eventually became the spokeswoman of the local Anti-Atomtod-Ausschuss (Anti Atomic-Death Committee). In 1958, she spent a short time on the AStA (German: Allgemeiner Studierendenausschuss, or General Committee of Students) of the university and wrote articles for various student newspapers.

=== Konkret and protest in the 1960s ===
In 1959, Meinhof joined the banned Communist Party of Germany (KPD) and later began working at the magazine konkret, a monthly which, until 1964, had clandestine financing from the East German government. Konkret was widely read by student activists and progressive intellectuals, and as its chief editor from 1962 to 1964, Meinhof was able to elicit contributions from established journalists and authors.

On 2 June 1967, Meinhof's exposure in konkret of German complicity in supporting the Pahlavi dynasty helped rally students to a demonstration in West Berlin against the visit of the Shah of Iran. When Iranian counter-demonstrators, including agents of the Shah's intelligence service, attacked the students, the police joined the affray beating the demonstrators into a side street where an officer shot and killed the student protester Benno Ohnesorg The leading Stern columnist, Sebastian Haffner whom Meinhof had befriended, took to konkret to suggest "with the [anti-] Student pogrom of 2 June 1967 fascism in West Berlin had thrown off its mask".

In February 1968, Meinhof was a participant in the International Vietnam Conference in West Berlin, which the authorities had permitted only in the face of large-scale protests. She was co-signatory, along with intellectuals including Ernst Bloch, Noam Chomsky, Eric Hobsbawm, Ernest Mandel, and Jean Paul Sartre, of the final declaration. This defined the U.S. intervention in Vietnam as "the Spain of our generation" and called for mobilisation against the "extermination" (Vernichtung) of the Vietnamese people.

=== Marriage to Klaus Rainer Röhl ===
In 1961, Meinhof married the co-founder and publisher of konkret, Klaus Rainer Röhl. Their marriage produced twins, Regine and Bettina, born on 21 September 1962. Meinhof and Röhl separated in 1967 and divorced a year later.

=== Benign brain tumor surgically removed ===
In 1962, Meinhof had a benign brain tumor surgically removed; the 1976 autopsy showed that remnants of the tumor and surgical scar tissue impinged on her amygdala.

== Establishment of the Red Army Faction ==
The attempted assassination of SDS leader Rudi Dutschke on 11 April 1968 provoked Meinhof to write an article in konkret demonstrating her increasingly militant attitude and containing perhaps her best-known quote:

Protest is when I say this does not please me.
Resistance is when I ensure what does not please me occurs no more.

Later that year, her writings on arson attacks in Frankfurt as protests against the Vietnam War resulted in her developing an acquaintance with the perpetrators, most significantly Andreas Baader and Gudrun Ensslin. She stopped writing for konkret which had in her opinion evolved into a completely commercial magazine in the early part of 1969, and many other authors followed her. She stated that neither she nor her collaborators wanted to give a left-wing alibi to the magazine that sooner or later "would become part of the counter-revolution, a thing that I cannot gloss over with my co-operation, especially now that it is impossible to change its course". Later, they organised an occupation at konkret's office (along with several members of the Außerparlamentarische Opposition), to distribute proclamations to the employees, something that failed since Röhl learned about it, and moved the employees to their homes to continue their work from there. Finally, Röhl's house was vandalized by some of the protesters. Meinhof arrived in Röhl's villa at 11:30, after police and journalists had already arrived. She was accused by Röhl (and subsequently described by the media) as the organizer of the vandalism. It was difficult to prove, as she was not there when it happened.

Perhaps her last work as an individual was the writing and production of the film Bambule in 1970, which focused on a group of West Berlin girls in juvenile detention; by the time it was scheduled to be aired, she was wanted for her part in the violent escape from police custody of Baader, and its broadcast was delayed until 1994.

== Release of Baader ==
In May 1970, Meinhof had been approached to help in Baader's escape by his girlfriend, Gudrun Ensslin. Meinhof persuaded the left-wing publisher Klaus Wagenbach to assist in the release of what he saw as a political prisoner. He issued her with a book contract, on the basis of which she petitioned authorities to allow Baader to travel from Moabit Prison for an interview at an institute for social research in the Dahlem district of Berlin. The plan was for armed comrades to enter the building, overpower the guards, and escape with Baader. No shooting was to take place, and Meinhof was to stay behind and deny any complicity in the action.

Baader arrived with two guards and set to work with Meinhof in the institute's library. Two women in Ensslin's group, along with a man with a criminal record (hired because of his supposed experience with armed encounters) broke into the institute. The man shot the elderly librarian Georg Linke, severely wounding him in his liver. It was later claimed that the man was holding two weapons, a pistol and a gas canister gun, and accidentally fired the wrong weapon in the confusion. Following the unanticipated shooting, Meinhof joined the others in jumping out of the institute's window. She then called a friend to pick up her children from school. Within days wanted posters appeared throughout Berlin offered a 10,000 DM reward for her capture for attempted murder.

== Action in the Red Army Faction and arrest ==
Later design of the RAF's insignia showing a red star and a Heckler & Koch MP5 submachine gun

In the next two years, Meinhof participated in the various bank robberies and bombings perpetrated by the group. She and other RAF members attempted to kidnap her children so that they could be sent to a camp for Palestinian orphans and educated there according to her wishes, but the twins were intercepted in Sicily and returned to their father, in part due to the intervention of Stefan Aust.

During this period, Meinhof wrote or recorded many of the manifestos and tracts for the RAF. The most significant of these is probably The Concept of the Urban Guerrilla, a response to an essay by Horst Mahler, that attempts to set out more correctly their prevailing ideology. It also included the first use of the name Rote Armee Fraktion and, in the publications of it, the first use of the RAF insignia. Her practical importance in the group, however, was often overstated by the media, the most obvious example being the common name Baader-Meinhof gang for the RAF. (Gudrun Ensslin is often considered to have been the effective female co-leader of the group rather than Meinhof.)

Meinhof wrote an essay defending the Munich massacre as part of a Palestinian strategy of resistance against Israeli land theft and ethnic cleansing of Palestinians.

On 14 June 1972, in Langenhagen, Fritz Rodewald, a teacher who had been providing accommodation to deserters from the U.S. Armed Forces, was approached by a stranger asking for an overnighting house the next day for herself and a friend. He agreed but later became suspicious that the woman might be involved with the RAF and called the police. The next day the pair arrived at Rodewald's dwelling while the police watched. The man was followed to a nearby telephone box and was found to be Gerhard Müller, who was armed. After arresting Müller, the police then arrested the woman – Meinhof.

== Imprisonment and trial ==
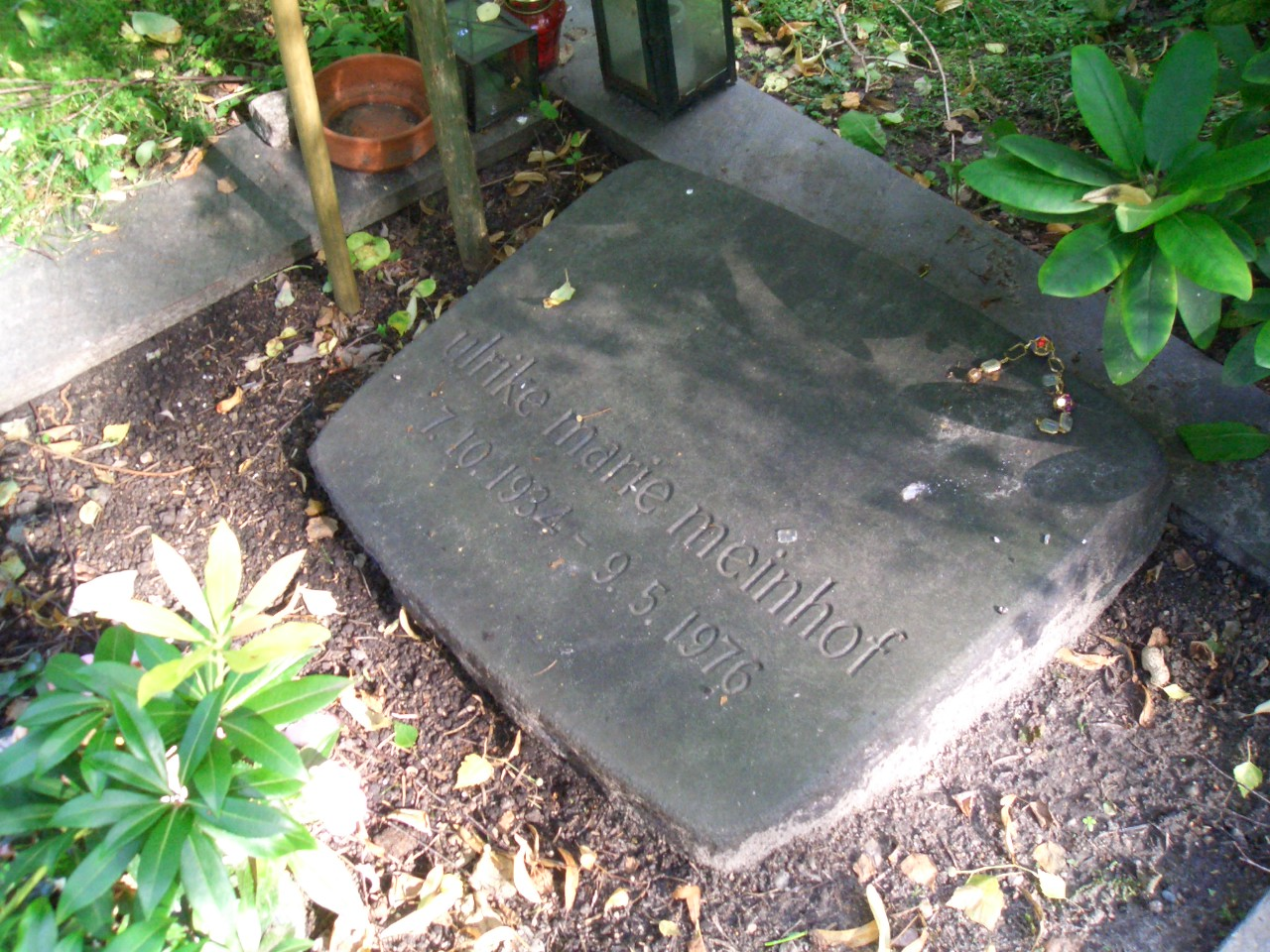
Burial site for Ulrike Meinhof

=== "Letter from a prisoner" 1972–73 ===
During her solitary confinement at Köln-Ossendorf Prison from June 1972 to February 1973, Meinhof wrote what was later published as "A Letter from a Prisoner in Isolation" (Brief einer Gefangenen aus dem Toten Trakt). It conveys what may be references to the effects of lengthy solitary confinement, having a brain tumour, (removed earlier in her life), and a sense of disorientation and despair:

The feeling that one's head is exploding…
The feeling that the brain is shriveling up like a baked fruit
The feeling that… one is being controlled remotely
The feeling that all one's associations are being cut away
The feeling of pissing the soul out of one's body, like someone who can no longer hold water.
…The raging aggressiveness for which there is no outlet. That's the worst. The clear understanding that one has no chance of survival…

=== Response to 1972 Munich Massacre ===
In December 1972, Meinhof, who was awaiting trial, was called to testify at Horst Mahler's trial where Mahler questioned her about the statement of support the two had issued for the massacre at the 1972 Summer Olympics in Munich. The Frankfurter Allgemeine Zeitung published the following hostile account of her response:

"Unless we absolve the German people of fascism—that the people really didn't know what was going on in the concentration camps—they can't be mobilized for our struggle," she said. After the war, the left, in dealing with fascism, were "negligent, stupid, and insolent." They dealt with the people in the foreground, but didn't look any deeper. "How was Auschwitz possible; what was antisemitism?" That is something that someone should have clarified at the time. Instead of collectively understanding Auschwitz as an expression of evil, Meinhof stated.

"The worst thing is that all of us, communists as well as others, were united in this." However, she now recognizes that antisemitism can in its own way be anticapitalist. It separates the hatred of people about their dependency on money as a means of exchange from their desire for communism.

"Auschwitz meant that six million Jews were murdered and carted off to Europe's garbage heap, dispensed with for what they were presented as: money Jews." Finance capital and banks, "the hard core of the system" of imperialism and capitalism deflected the hate of the people for money and oppression from itself and transferred it to the Jews. Not having made this connection clear was the failure of the left and the communists.

Germans were antisemitic, therefore they are today RAF supporters. Only they don't know it, because they've forgotten that they must be absolved of fascism and murdering Jews, and that antisemitism is in reality hatred of capitalism. In this regard Ulrike Meinhof ably constructed a remarkable statement about the failure of the Baader-Meinhof Group. With it, it is also possible to praise the Black September attack in Munich. She claimed to feel an "historical identity" with the Jews of the Warsaw Ghetto, who attempted an unarmed uprising leading to their defeat. "We have broken through the entire blah blah. We have provided the left with obvious encouragement, which they have voluntarily allowed to dissipate, because we've all been arrested."

=== Sentencing ===
After two years of preliminary hearings, Meinhof was sentenced to eight years imprisonment on 29 November 1974. Eventually, Meinhof, Baader, Ensslin, and Jan-Carl Raspe were jointly charged on 19 August 1975, with four counts of murder, fifty-four of attempted murder, and a single count of forming a criminal association. Before the trial was concluded, Meinhof was found hanged by a rope, fashioned from a towel, in her cell in the Stammheim Prison, Stuttgart, on 9 May 1976. It is highly probable that, if not for her death, she would have been sentenced to life imprisonment plus 15 years. (The remaining three defendants received such a sentence, designed to minimize the possibility of early parole.)

== Death ==
On 9 May 1976, Meinhof was found dead in her prison cell in Stuttgart-Stammheim. The official verdict was Meinhof had died by suicide, but this was disputed by her sister and many others. Meinhof was buried in Berlin-Mariendorf, six days after her death. Her funeral attracted a demonstration of about 7,000 people. Demonstrations took place across the country, and social and political prisoners in Berlin and Hessen held a three-day hunger strike. Jean-Paul Sartre and Simone de Beauvoir in an open letter compared her death to the worst crimes of the Nazi era.

In late 2002, following investigations by her daughter Bettina, it was discovered that Meinhof's brain had been retained (apparently without permission) following the autopsy performed as part of the investigation into her death. The original autopsy had found brain injury near the amygdala, resulting from successful surgery in 1962 to remove a benign cyst. The unpublished autopsy results at the time stated that the brain injuries "justified questions as to the culpability" of Meinhof. Bernhard Bogerts, a psychiatrist at Magdeburg University, later re-examined the brain and also doubted that Meinhof was fully criminally responsible. On Bettina's request, the brain was interred in Meinhof's burial place on 19 December 2002.

=== Controversy surrounding her death ===
The official response was to declare her death a suicide, and try to justify it with claims that she had become increasingly isolated from other RAF prisoners. Notes exchanged between them in prison included one by Ensslin, describing her as "too weak". The official findings were not accepted by many in the RAF and other militant organisations, and there are still some who doubt their accuracy and believe that she was murdered by the authorities.

A second investigation was carried out by an international group. The findings of the inquiry were published under the title Der Tod Ulrike Meinhofs. Bericht der Internationalen Untersuchungskommission (The Death of Ulrike Meinhof. Report of the International Investigation Committee) in 1979.

==== Last days in prison ====
Meinhof's last appearance in court was on 4 May 1976, in a hearing the defendants had requested in order to provide evidence about the participation of West Germany in the Vietnam War. This, they claimed, was the cause of their radicalisation, and was their basis for demanding the status of prisoners of war (see above). According to Jutta Ditfurth, the last days before Meinhof's death went smoothly. The prisoners (including Meinhof) spent their meeting time (30 minutes, twice per day) discussing various philosophers and political issues. One of the guards noted that they were laughing.

In early May, attorney Axel Azzola contacted his client (Meinhof). They were hopeful about the possibilities that the new strategy seemed to offer. They also discussed whether Meinhof could testify as a witness at the International Law Conference in Geneva where a delegation of lawyers planned to denounce the measure of detention in solitary confinement. Finally, Meinhof was planning to reveal main witness Gerhard Müller's role in the trial. Federal prosecutors had indicted the four defendants for the murder of a policeman Norbert Schmid, who was shot by Müller himself.

During the press conference called by defense attorneys, one of Meinhof's lawyers, Michael Oberwinder, stated that it was less than a week before Meinhof's death that they had a very involved conversation. He claimed that there was not the least sign of depression or lack of interest on her part and that it was an animated discussion in the context of which Meinhof explained the group's point of view.

Meinhof's last visitor was Giovanni Capelli, lawyer of the Red Brigades. He conveyed the desire of the Red Brigades to contact her and described the conditions of detention in Italy where prisoners were not held in isolation (except Renato Curcio) and were politically active. They also discussed the establishment of an international committee of lawyers to defend the RAF. Capelli later said that Meinhof gave him the impression of "a vivid, lifelike woman", "open to all questions". They arranged to meet again soon. "She behaved like a woman who wanted to live".

==== Autopsy and investigation ====
At 9.20 a.m. on 9 May, the Ministry of Justice of Baden-Württemberg announced that Meinhof had died by suicide, although the initial post-mortem body examination by Professor Joachim Rauschke did not begin until at least 9:25 a.m. At 9:34 a.m. the German news agency (dpa) announced "Suicide by hanging". Two hours later Professor Rauschke together with Hans Joachim Mallach performed the official autopsy in the general hospital of Stuttgart from 11:45 a.m. until 12:45 p.m., whose outcome was "death by hanging beyond doubt". According to Ditfurth the hasty press releases that followed Meinhof's death, were similar to those of April 1972, when it was incorrectly broadcast that Meinhof had killed herself. In the following days, the newspapers reported in detail what were supposed to be Meinhof's thoughts, like: "she realised her mistake," "she had become aware of the futility," and that she "resigned to death".

There was a concern among Meinhof supporters about the forensic surgeons chosen by the state to perform the autopsy. Mallach (NSDAP Member No. 9154986) had been a member of the SS. He served in World War II as corporal in a Panzer division. In 1977, he made (without approval) and kept for a long time the death masks of Baader, Ensslin, and Raspe. Rauschke also performed the autopsy of Siegfried Hausner one year earlier and was accused by fellows and supporters of the RAF of ignoring the injuries to Hausner's head, so as to cover up the true cause of his death.

On 11 May a second autopsy was performed on demand of Wienke Zitzlaff by Werner Janssen and Jürgen Schröder, even though the brain, a lot of critical organs, and tissue parts had been removed from the body. Also, her nails had been cut, so the doctors could not determine clearly if there were traces of struggle. Some examinations could not take place since a critical time had passed. Janssen concluded that the most probable cause of death was "suicide by hanging", however in order to come to a definite conclusion he insisted on being given access to the report of the first autopsy, something that never happened.

Finally, on demand of Meinhof's attorney Klaus Croissant and the International Committee for Political Prisoners, an international investigation commission was created in order to examine the conditions surrounding Meinhof's death. Once more the German authorities refused to give the complete (first) autopsy report to the commission, hindering their investigation. In 1978 the committee published its report, concluding that: "The formal claim that Ulrike Meinhof committed suicide by hanging is unfounded, given the fact that the investigation results reasonably converge to the conclusion that she could not hang herself. Most probably Ulrike Meinhof was already dead before she was hanged and there are warning signs indicating the involvement of a third party regarding her death."

==== Suicide disputation ====
The circumstances around Meinhof's death have been disputed by people close to her, including many of her relatives, friends, lawyers, and comrades, presenting various arguments. According to Meinhof's sister, Wienke Zitzlaff, during her last visit to the prison, Meinhof had told her: "You can stand up and fight only while you are alive. If they say I committed suicide, be sure that it was a murder."

There are inquiries regarding the procedure followed by the authorities, including the autopsy reports and the findings of the international commission. Some of them are:

- Some exams like the histamine test were omitted, something that could determine if Meinhof was alive the moment she was hanged
- Meinhof's body and head lacked some common signs of suicide by hanging.
- Both autopsy reports mention severe swelling in external genitals as well as abrasions on the left buttock. Jansen-Schroder's report also mentioned contusions in the right hip area and fluid accumulation in the lungs.
- Although the prison report mentions that the chair used by Meinhof to hang herself had fallen, photographs published by the police show that her left leg rests on that (standing) chair that is upon the soft mattress.

Some other questions still remain, including:

- Why there were no fingerprints of Meinhof on the light bulb she had? What about the contradictory statements regarding the internal organs of the neck, and the noose length?
- Why were no fabric traces from the towel found either on the knife or the scissors Meinhof had?
- Two days after Meinhof's death, the prison staff cleaned and painted her cell despite the fact that it had been repainted in September 1975 (8 months before). Shouldn't the cell be sealed? Why had police seized all of Meinhof's personal items and refused to give them to her relatives or lawyers? Other prisoners reported that handwritten documents, which Meinhof used to keep with her inside a black dossier, had also disappeared. Her fellow prisoners insisted that her cell remained intact until Meinhof's lawyers arrived, but "by the time the first lawyer arrived the metal tank had already been extracted hastily" (Ensslin). They were prohibited to come closer to the corridor in order to have visual contact with the cell. The authorities also prohibited Wienke Zitzlaff, Anja Röhl, Klaus Croissant, and Michael Oberwinder to view Meinhof's body and the inside of the cell. According to the official explanation they were also looking for incriminating documents that could be used against Klaus Croissant.

Finally, there is a dispute over the arguments regarding Meinhof's motive. Some of the points usually mentioned are:

- That no suicide note was found (even though, according to Ensslin, Meinhof was working on a typewriter the last night – as she used to do in the last months), has been considered suspicious. Why would Meinhof allow the government and media to talk about "rejection", and "awareness of her political mistake", at the moment that, according to her lawyers, her main concern was to ensure the integrity of organisation's political identity both to the trial and beyond?
- The official claim was that there was tension among the defendants and especially between Meinhof and Ensslin. On 9 May the Federal Prosecutor Felix Kaul spoke about "deep contradistinctions" and "profound clashes" among the team, claiming Meinhof had realized that Baader was "a common criminal", and finally tried to prove the conflict between Meinhof and Ensslin by mentioning a series of letters between them. However these letters were dated no later than early March when they informed the other prisoners (through the "info" network) that their conflict was over, mentioning that: "We didn't even realise what they were doing to ourselves" (Meinhof), the cause of their conflict "finally seemed strange" when they "understood what was happening" to them (Ensslin).
- When a Stern representative asked Traugott Bender (Minister of Justice of Baden-Württemberg): "Since the federal prosecutors of Karlsruhe were (somehow) aware of the tension within the group, why wasn't this noticed by the prison staff?" he answered: "If there were conflicts they were older and had never led to something like this". When he was asked if Meinhof had been isolated by the rest of the prisoners, he answered, "I am not aware of that fact." Jailer Renate Frede and prison official Horst Bubeck reported that they had not noticed any strange or unusual behaviour, or conflicts among the prisoners.

== Legacy in culture, and portrayals ==
The book Lieber wütend als traurig (Better angry than sad) by Alois Prinz was intended as a mainly faithful account of Meinhof's life story for adolescents.

Meinhof's life has been the subject, to varying degrees of fictionalisation, of several films and stage productions. Treatment in films include Reinhard Hauff's 1986 Stammheim, an account of the Stammheim trial, Margarethe von Trotta's 1981 Marianne and Juliane and Uli Edel's 2008 film The Baader Meinhof Complex. Stage treatments include the 1990 opera Ulrike Meinhof by Johann Kresnik, the 1993 play Leviathan by Dea Loher, the 2005 play La extraordinaria muerte de Ulrike M. by Spanish playwright Carlos Be and the 2006 play Ulrike Maria Stuart by Austrian playwright Elfriede Jelinek. The 1981 French movie Birgitt Haas Must Be Killed is inspired by Meinhof's death.

In 1978, Dario Fo and Franca Rame wrote the monologue Moi, Ulrike, je crie...

The 2010 feature documentary Children of the Revolution tells Meinhof's story from the perspective of her daughter, journalist and historian Bettina Röhl.

Subtopia, a novel published in 2005 by Australian author and academic A.L. McCann, is partially set in Berlin and contains a character who is obsessed with Meinhof and another who claims to have attended her funeral.

The 2013 book "Revolutionary Brain" by Harold Jaffe features a titular section devoted to the brain of Meinhof.

The 2018 film 7 Days in Entebbe about Operation Entebbe mentions Meinhof as motivation for the participation of the Germans in the hijacking, particularly Brigitte Kuhlmann. The film suggests Meinhof was a friend of Kuhlmann and Böse and that a mistake Kuhlmann made resulted in her imprisonment and subsequent death.

=== Music ===
In 1975, the Italian singer-songwriter Claudio Lolli published the song Incubo Numero Zero (Nightmare #0), with the verse "turn off the light, thought Ulrike", and more.

Marianne Faithfull's 1979 album Broken English had the title track dedicated to Meinhof.

The anarcho punk band Chumbawamba's 1990 album, Slap! featured an opening and closing track, both named after Meinhof. The first track was entitled Ulrike and featured lyrics that directly involve Meinhof as the protagonist and the final track was an instrumental reprise of the first track. and was entitled "Meinhof". The album's liner notes included information and an article relating to the song Ulrike.

Electronica act Doris Days created a track entitled To Ulrike M., in which there is a passage spoken in German throughout the song, presumably an archived audio file from Meinhof herself. This track has since been remixed by other electronica acts like Zero 7, Kruder & Dorfmeister, and The Amalgamation of Soundz.

The German duo Andreas Ammer and F.M. Einheit released an album in 1996 entitled Deutsche Krieger, a substantial portion of which consists of audio recordings of and about Meinhof.

Der Plan, the electronic music group from Düsseldorf published 2004 the song Ulrike, as part of the Die Verschwörung album.

London-based experimental group Cindytalk has an electronic side-project called Bambule, named after the Meinhof film of the same name.

German Neue Deutsche Härte band Rammstein feature Meinhof, played by lead singer Till Lindemann, in the music video to their 2019 song Deutschland.

The English alternative rock band Ulrika Spacek took their name from Meinhof and American performer Sissy Spacek.

The track Ulrike by Portuguese electronic band Sensible Soccers on their 2014 album "8" was inspired by Meinhof.

=== In films & documentaries ===
- Ulrike Marie Meinhof, a documentary produced by ARTE in 1994.
- Ulrike Meinhof – Wege in den Terror (Ulrike Meinhof – Paths to Terror), a documentary produced by RBB in 2006.
- So macht Kommunismus Spass [Making Communism Fun], a documentary produced by Bettina Röhl, Meinhof's daughter, for Der Spiegel TV in 2006.
- The Baader Meinhof Complex (2008).
- Children of the Revolution (documentary, 2010).

== Bibliography ==
- Karl Wolff oder: Porträt eines anpassungsfähigen Deutschen (Karl Wolff or: A Portrait of an Adaptable German). Radio documentary. Director: Heinz Otto Müller. Hessischer Rundfunk, Abendstudio, 1964.
- Gefahr vom Fließband. Arbeitsunfälle – beobachtet und kritisch beschrieben. (Dangers of the Assembly-Line. Industrial Accidents – observed and critically analysed). Radio documentary. Director: Peter Schulze-Rohr. Hessischer Rundfunk, Abendstudio, 1965.
- Bambule – Fürsorge – Sorge für wen? (Bambule: Welfare – Providing for whom?) Wagenbach, 1971, (Republished 2002, ISBN 3-8031-2428-X)
- Die Würde des Menschen ist antastbar. Aufsätze und Polemiken. Wagenbach, Berlin 1980.

Works of the Red Army Faction

- Das Konzept Stadtguerilla (The Concept of the Urban Guerilla), 1971
- Stadtguerilla und Klassenkampf (Urban Guerilla and Class Struggle), 1972/1974
- Fragment Regarding Structure (1976)
- Deutschland, Deutschland unter anderem (Germany, Germany among other things), Wagenbach, 1995 (ISBN 3-803-12253-8)
- Die Würde des Menschen ist antastbar (The Dignity of Man Is Violable), Wagenbach, 2004 (ISBN 3-803-12491-3)
- Karin Bauer, ed. Everybody Talks about the Weather... We Don't: The Writings of Ulrike Meinhof, Seven Stories Press, New York, 2008 (ISBN 978-1583228319). A selection of Meinhof's writings published in konkret from 1960 to 1968, with a foreword by Elfriede Jelinek, translated by Luise von Flotow.
- Ulrike Meinhof's notes from the Dead Wing.

== See also ==
- List of people who died by suicide by hanging
