= Peter Leibinger =

German mechanical engineer

Peter Leibinger (born 23 April 1967 in Stuttgart) is a German mechanical engineer and manager. He was deputy chairman of the board of the high-tech company Trumpf SE + Co. KG. and has been chairman of the supervisory board since July 2023. He has been president of the Federation of German Industries (BDI) since 2025.

== Life ==
Peter Leibinger is one of three children born to Berthold Leibinger and Doris Leibinger, née Schaible. His siblings are Nicola Leibinger-Kammüller and the architect Regine Leibinger. Peter Leibinger has been married since 1997 and has four children.

Leibinger studied mechanical engineering at the Rheinisch-Westfälische Technische Hochschule (RWTH) in Aachen. He became deputy chairman of the management board of Trumpf in 2005, after his father Berthold Leibinger († 2018) handed over the management of the company to the next generation of the family; his sister Nicola Leibinger-Kammüller took over as chairwoman. When the company reorganised its group management on 1 July 2017, Peter Leibinger was appointed Chief Technology Officer (CTO). He was responsible for research and development, sales and service, and the development and expansion of new business areas. On 1 July 2023, Peter Leibinger took over as Chairman of the Supervisory Board.

In September 2024, Siegfried Russwurm, then president of the Federation of German Industries (BDI), proposed Leibinger as his successor. In November 2024, the BDI's general assembly followed this proposal and elected Leibinger as BDI president. He took office on 1 January 2025.

Leibinger is involved in various political, scientific and cultural committees. Since 2011, he has been the spokesman of the ‘Photonics and Quantum Systems’ programme committee of the Federal Ministry of Education and Research. He is a member of the supervisory board of Kärcher SE, a member of the Senate of acatech – National Academy of Science and Engineering, the advisory board of Deutsche Private Equity (DPE), the university council of HMDK Stuttgart, and the board of trustees of the Arbeitskreis evangelischer Unternehmer e. V.

== Honours and awards ==
- 2011: Honorary doctorate from the Technical University of Dresden
- 2021: Cross of the Order of Merit of the Federal Republic of Germany
- 2023: Arthur L. Schawlow Award
