= Dieter Kempf =

German economist (born 1953)

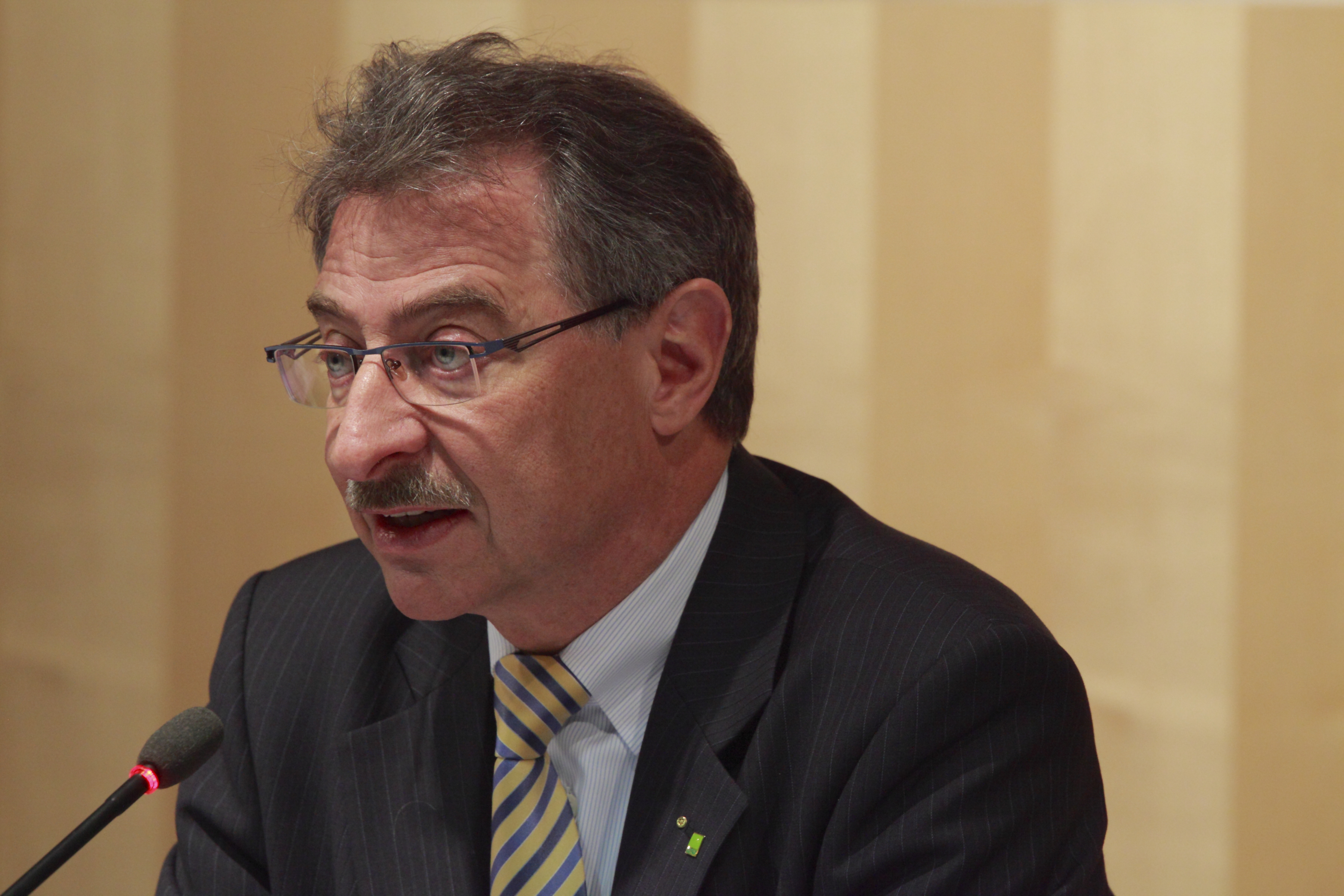
- Kempf in 2010
- Born: January 10, 1953 (age 73); Munich, Germany
- Education: LMU Munich
- Occupations: Manager, economist
- Employer(s): DATEV; Federation of German Industries (BDI)
- Title: President of the BDI (2017–2020)
- Spouse: Married
- Children: 1 daughter
- Awards: Cross of the Order of Merit of the Federal Republic of Germany (2008); Bavarian Order of Merit (2023)

Dieter Kempf (born 10 January 1953 in Munich) served as president of the Federation of German Industries (BDI) from 2017 to the end of 2020. Before he was elected as BDI President, Kempf was chairman of the board of DATEV eG in Nuremberg for 20 years.

== Life ==
Kempf graduated from the Städtisches Adolf-Weber-Gymnasium in Munich in 1972. He then studied business administration at LMU Munich from 1973 to 1978 and graduated with a degree in business administration. Parallel to school and his studies, Kempf was one of the first German employees to work at McDonald's for seven years, most recently in administration.

Kempf is married and has one daughter.

== Profession ==
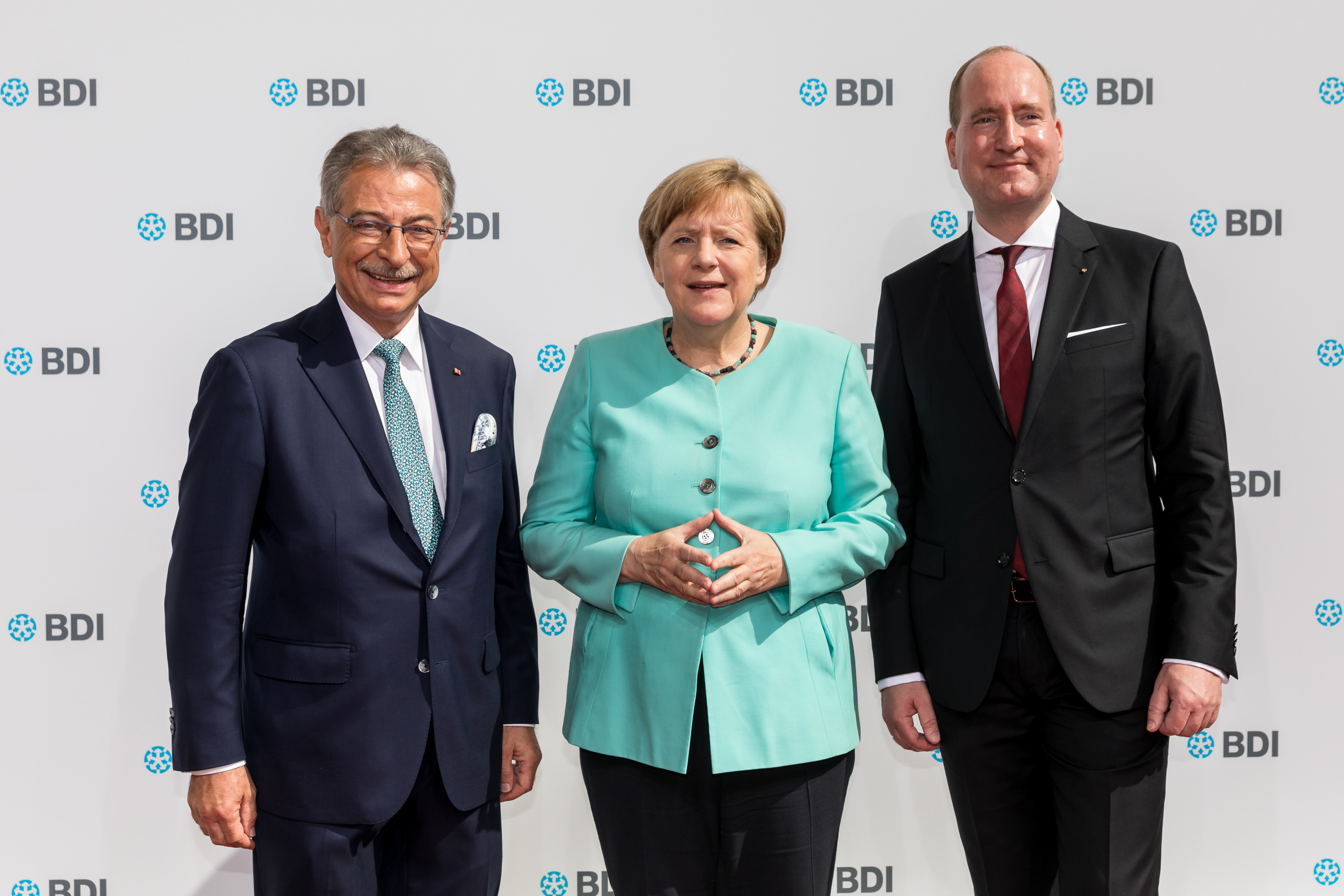
BDI president Kempf, federal chancellor Merkel, BDI managing director Lang at the Day of German Industry 2017

From 1978 to 1991, Kempf worked for Ernst & Young Germany. In 1989, he became a partner and was thus also a managing director and co-partner. From June 1991 to 2016, Kempf worked at DATEV eG in Nuremberg. As a member of the management board, he was responsible for product and software development. In July 1996, Kempf became chairman of the management board of DATEV eG and held this office until March 2016. During Kempf's time, DATEV developed from a cooperative operating in Germany into one of the largest IT service providers in Europe.

In 2005, Kempf was appointed honorary professor of business administration at the Faculty of Economics and Social Sciences at the University of Erlangen–Nuremberg. He has also been chairman of the University Council of Ansbach University of Applied Sciences since 2015. From 2011 to 2015, Kempf was president of the BDI member association Bitkom and vice president of the Federation of German Industries; before he was finally unanimously elected president by the General Assembly. He is also involved in various supervisory and advisory boards: Kempf is chairman of the advisory board of the Alliance for Cyber Security and a member of the advisory board of the association Deutschland sicher im Netz (DsiN). He is also a member of the National Cyber Security Council, the supervisory board of Deutsche Messe AG and the Association Council of the Bavarian Cooperative Association (GVB).

Kempf was elected president by the BDI general assembly on 28 November 2016 by secret ballot. He took office on 1 January 2017 as the successor to Ulrich Grillo. As president of the BDI, the umbrella organization of German industry and industry-related service providers, he represented 36 industry associations and their 100,000 member companies with a total of 8 million employees in politics and in public. His term of office ended on 31 December 2020, when he served as Vice President of the BDI. He was succeeded as BDI president by Siegfried Russwurm. Kempf has been a member of the German government's Data Ethics Commission since July 2018.

== Honors ==
In July 2008, Kempf was awarded the Cross of the Order of Merit of the Federal Republic of Germany and the State Medal for Special Services to the Bavarian Economy in 2015. In July 2023, he received the Bavarian Order of Merit.
