= Schleyer (disambiguation) =

Hanns Martin Schleyer (1915–1977) was an influential German manager, employer, and industry representative.

Schleyer may also refer to:

- Waltrude Schleyer, (1916–2008), widow of Hanns Martin Schleyer
- Johann Martin Schleyer (1831–1912), Catholic priest who invented the constructed language Volapük
- Paul von Ragué Schleyer (1930–2014), American chemist
