= Emil Ketterer =

German Olympic sprinter and SA general

SA Liaison to the Reich Health Leader
- In office 1 February 1937 – 8 May 1945

Chief, SA Medical Office Supreme SA Leadership
- In office 1 November 1933 – 1 February 1937
- Preceded by: Paul Hocheisen
- Succeeded by: Hermann Brauneck

Other positions
- 1936–1945: Chairman, TSV 1860 München
- 1933–1945: City Councilor, Munich

Personal details
- Born: 6 August 1883 Neustadt, Grand Duchy of Baden, German Empire
- Died: 23 December 1959 (aged 76) Munich, Bavaria, West Germany
- Party: Nazi Party
- Other political affiliations: Bavarian People's Party
- Education: Ludwig-Maximilians-Universität München
- Profession: Physician

Military service
- Allegiance: German Empire
- Branch/service: Bavarian Army; Freikorps
- Years of service: 1914–1918; 1919
- Rank: Stabsarzt
- Unit: 2nd Infantry Regiment
- Battles/wars: World War I
- Awards: Iron Cross, 2nd class Military Merit Order, 4th class with swords Order of the Zähringer Lion

Emil Ketterer (6 August 1883 – 23 December 1959) was a German physician and track and field athlete who competed in the 1912 Summer Olympics. Later in his life, he joined the Nazi Party and its paramilitary organization, the Sturmabteilung (SA). He was the chief of the SA Medical Office in the Supreme SA Leadership from 1933 to 1937 and rose to the rank of SA-Obergruppenführer. As a medical doctor, he was a strong advocate of the euthanasia of disabled persons carried out under the Nazi regime. He was the father-in-law of Hanns-Martin Schleyer, an SS officer and West German business executive who was murdered by the Red Army Faction in 1977.

== Early life, education and military service ==
Born in Neustadt, Ketterer attended the prestigious Fürstenberg-Gymnasium in Donaueschingen, obtaining his Abitur in 1905. He then studied medicine at the Ludwig-Maximilians-Universität München, where he specialized in internal medicine and sports medicine. He was also a member of the student association Burschenschaft Arminia-Rhenania. An athletic runner, he set a world record for the 100 metre sprint in 1911 with a time of 10.5 seconds. However, at the 1912 Summer Olympics in Stockholm, he was eliminated in the first round of the 100 metres competition when he did not finish his race due to an injury.

Ketterer volunteered for military service in the First World War as a regimental medical officer with the 2nd Infantry Regiment of the Royal Bavarian Army. He served from 1914 to 1918, attaining the rank of Stabsarzt and earning the Iron Cross, 2nd class, the Military Merit Order 4th class with swords and the Order of the Zähringer Lion. After the war, Ketterer settled in Munich and worked as a general medical practitioner. He joined the conservative Bavarian People's Party and was active in the Freikorps, helping to suppress the Bavarian Soviet Republic in 1919. Ketterer also was a member of several right-wing paramilitary organizations, including the Organization Lenz and the Bund Reichskriegsflagge.

== Career in the Nazi Sturmabteilung ==
Ketterer joined the Nazi Party in January 1923 and, in November of that year, he took part in Adolf Hitler's Beer Hall Putsch, for which he later would be awarded the Nazi Blood Order. While the Party was banned in the wake of the failed putsch, he became a member of the Altreichsflagge, and he rejoined the Party on 14 April 1925 (membership number 697) after the ban was lifted. He was one of the co-founders of the National Socialist German Doctors' League in 1929 and was named chairman of its disciplinary tribunal.

Ketterer joined the Nazi paramilitary Sturmabteilung (SA) in July 1931. Following the Nazi seizure of power, Ketterer was named head of the German Sports Medicine Association. He was made a Munich City Councilor in April 1933. He also was assigned to the Supreme SA Leadership as an SA-Gruppenführer and the chief of staff to Paul Hocheisen, the chief of the SA Medical Office. In November, Ketterer succeeded him in that post. During his time in the SA medical service, Ketterer was known to be a strong proponent of the euthanasia program that was carried out on disabled persons. He also served as the personal physician to SA-Stabschef Ernst Röhm, and was present when Hitler arrested Röhm in the Night of the Long Knives. Ketterer was able to retain his post under Röhm's successor, Viktor Lutze. He unsuccessfully sought a seat at the 1936 Reichstag election. On 1 February 1937, he was replaced as head of the SA Medical Office by Hermann Brauneck, and was named as the SA liaison to the Reich Health Leader. On 9 November 1938, he was promoted to SA-Obergruppenführer. From 1936 to 1945, he was chairman of the TSV 1860 München sports club. Little is documented about his post-war life, and he died in Munich in 1959.

== Family ==
His daughter Waltrude (1916–2008) was the wife of Hanns-Martin Schleyer, who was kidnapped and murdered by Red Army Faction terrorists in 1977.

== Sources ==
- Campbell, Bruce (1998). The SA Generals and the Rise of Nazism. Lexington: University Press of Kentucky. ISBN 978-0-813-12047-8.
- Emil Ketterer Biography in Olympic Athletes
- Emil Ketterer Biography in Olympedia Athletes
- Klee, Ernst (2007). Das Personenlexikon zum Dritten Reich. Wer war was vor und nach 1945. Frankfurt-am-Main: Fischer-Taschenbuch-Verlag. ISBN 978-3-596-16048-8.
