= Hanns Martin Schleyer Foundation =

Foundation

The Hanns Martin Schleyer Foundation (German: Hanns Martin Schleyer-Stiftung) is a German foundation that promotes research in economics, law and cultural sciences. It was established in 1977 by the Confederation of German Employers' Associations (BDA) and the Federation of German Industries (BDI).

The foundation is located in Cologne, and awards the Friedwart Bruckhaus Prize, the Hanns Martin Schleyer Prize, and the Universitas Prize for Science Journalism.

== Hanns Martin Schleyer Prize ==
The foundation administers the Hanns Martin Schleyer Prize (German: Hanns Martin Schleyer-Preis), an award established by automobile manufacturer Daimler AG in 1982 in honor of Hanns Martin Schleyer, a former business executive of the BDA and BDI. Schleyer was kidnapped and murdered by the Red Army Faction (RAF) in 1977 after being targeted by radical elements of the German student movement due to his role in those business organizations and his past activities as a former officer of the Nazi SS. The abduction and murder were part of an RAF campaign known as the German Autumn. According to its administrator, the Prize is given annually for "outstanding contributions to consolidating and strengthening the foundations of a community based on the principle of individual freedom."

The first of the annual prizes was awarded to economist and Nobel laureate Friedrich Hayek in 1984. In 2013, the Prize was presented to Helmut Maucher, former CEO of Nestlé and an outspoken critic of the German social welfare system.

=== Prizewinners ===
- Ahmad Mansour (2025)
- Joachim Gauck (2024)
- Susanne Klatten (2023)
- Heike Göbel (2022)
- Wolfgang Ischinger (2021)
- Helga Rabl-Stadler and Salzburg Festival (2021)
- Timothy Garton Ash (2019)
- Clemens Fuest (2018)
- Nicola Leibinger-Kammüller (2017)
- Wolfgang Schäuble (2016)
- Udo Di Fabio (2015)
- Marianne Birthler (2014)
- Helmut Maucher (2013)
- Helmut Schmidt (2012)
- Jürgen Strube (2011)
- Jean-Claude Juncker (2010)
- Helmut Kohl (2009)
- Joachim Milberg (2008)
- Günter de Bruyn (2007)
- Klaus von Dohnanyi (2006)
- Hubert Markl (2005)
- Meinhard Miegel (2004)
- Hans Peter Stihl (2003)
- Joachim Fest (2002)
- Helmuth Rilling (2001)
- Paul Kirchhof (2000)
- Elisabeth Noelle-Neumann (1999)
- Reinhard Mohn (1998)
- Ernst-Joachim Mestmäcker (1997)
- Hermann Rappe (1996)
- Bernd Rüthers (1995)
- Hermann Lübbe (1994)
- Franz König (1993)
- Birgit Breuel (1992)
- Kurt Masur (1991)
- Reiner Kunze (1990)
- Otto Schulmeister (1989)
- Golo Mann (1988)
- Hans-Georg Gadamer (1987)
- Karl Carstens (1986)
- Ernst Nolte (1985)
- Friedrich August von Hayek (1984)
