= Dagny Lüdemann =

German journalist

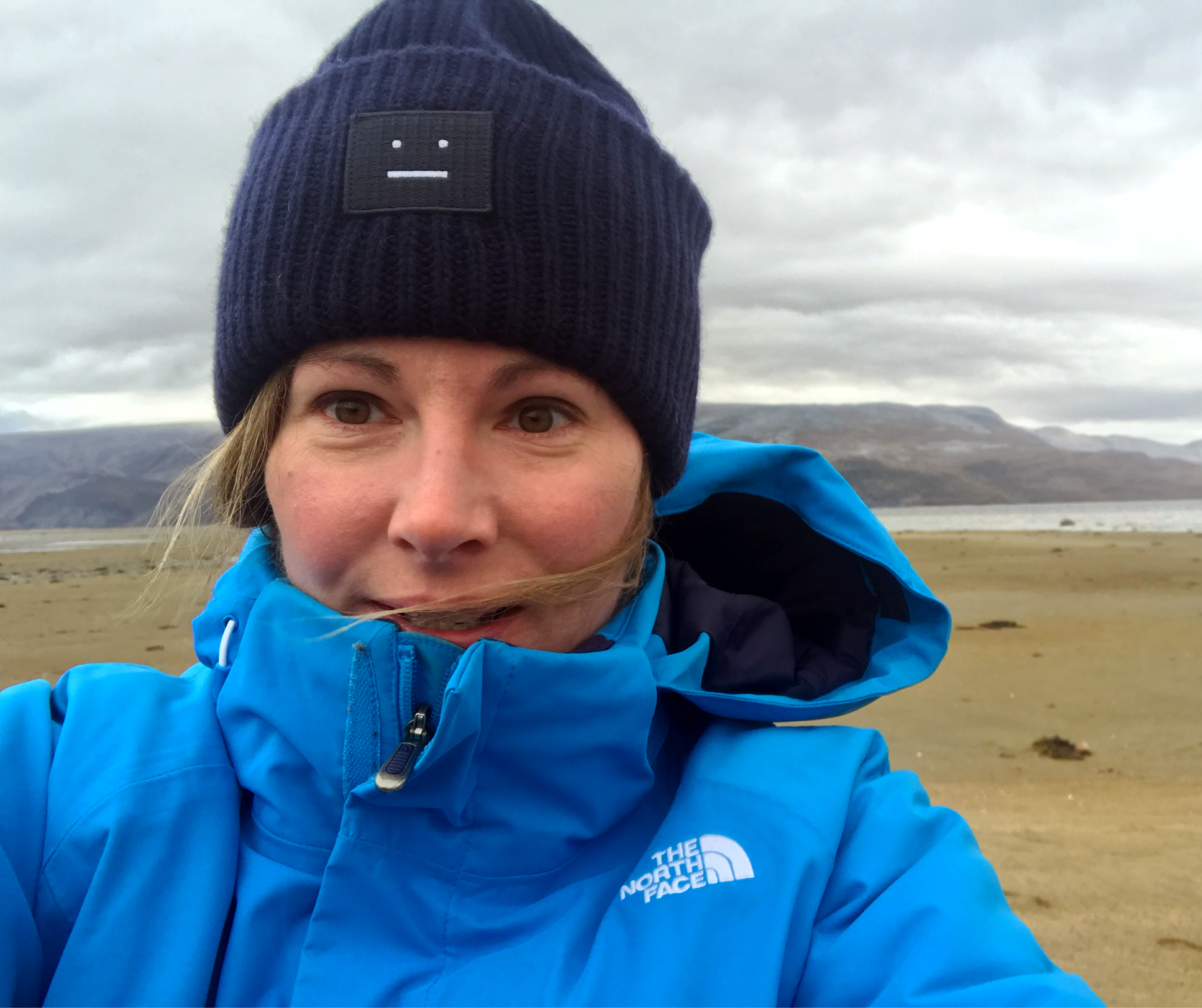
Dagny Lüdemann 2018 in Norwegen

Dagny Lüdemann is a German science journalist, biologist and chief science reporter at Zeit Online. She writes and is responsible for articles in the fields of nature, zoology, wildlife conservation, ecology, infection biology and health.

== Life ==
Dagny Lüdemann grew up in Hamburg.

Lüdemann studied biology and French at the University of Hamburg and modern French literature (Lettres Modernes) at the Université Paul Valéry in Montpellier, France. During her studies, Lüdemann worked as an online editor for medicine and health topics at an agency for internet communication.

After completing her master's degree and a language course in Granada, Spain she did editorial internships at Spektrum der Wissenschaft, the German newspaper Tagesspiegel and the popular science magazine P.M.-Magazine. She wrote as a freelance author for the magazines GEO and Astronomie heute as well as for the online portal Spektrumdirekt.de. From 2005 to 2007 she completed a traineeship at the Tagesspiegel in Berlin, where she then worked as a science journalist and was responsible for the health page of the newspaper. In 2008 she moved from the daily newspaper to Zeit Online and built the science department as an editor. From 2011 to 2021 she headed the Zeit online department group Wissen/Digital/Zeit Campus and trained nine graduates of the science journalism course at the University of Dortmund as trainee science editors. Since 2021 she is chief science reporter .

The journalist lives in Berlin and Hamburg, is a recreational scuba diver and is privately committed to marine protection. In 2015 she worked as a volunteer for the NGO Seaturtle Conservation Bonaire (STCB) in the Netherlands Antilles during a sabbatical for three months.

== Prizes and awards ==
In 2015, Lüdemann and her team – including science journalists Sven Stockrahm and Alina Schadwinkel – were nominated for a Grimme Online Award and received a Lead Award for the multimedia dossier “Wer darf leben (Who is allowed to live)?”. The dossier, translated into plain language, describes the opportunities and risks of modern prenatal diagnostics and their consequences for people with chromosomal abnormalities such as Down syndrome.

In 2017 she was awarded the Universitas prize for science journalism The Hanns-Martin-Schleyer-Foundation thus honors her many years of work as a bridge builder between science and society. It is thanks to her commitment that "scientific topics are increasingly perceived and reflected, especially among the younger generation," the foundation writes in its justification.

In 2021, Lüdemann won the “Wildtier und Umwelt” (Wild Animal and Environment) journalism award from the German Hunting Association in the “online” category for her report “Wo Fledermäuse schlafen (Where bats sleep)”. For 2021 she was voted one of Germany's 10 best science journalists by Medium Magazin.

== Memberships ==
Lüdemann is a member of the Science Press Conference (Wissenschaftspressekonferenz, WPK)) and was on the board from 2011 to 2015. She has been a member of the main jury for the Franco-German Journalist Award since 2013 and the Memento Award for neglected diseases since 2014. From 2018 to 2020 she was part of the NaturVision film festival jury. In 2021 the chief reporter was a member of the award jury for the international nature film festival Green Screen and the nomination jury for the German Nature Film Award. In the year 2022 she was a member of the jury for the CineMare marine film festival in Kiel.
