= Kidnapping and murder of Hanns Martin Schleyer =

Kidnapping and murder by Red Army Faction (RAF) in 1977

- Part of German Autumn
- Location: Cologne, West Germany (kidnapping); France (murder)
- Date: 5 September 1977– 18 October 1977
- Attack type: Kidnapping, murder
- Deaths: 5
- Victim: Hanns Martin Schleyer
- Perpetrator: Red Army Faction (RAF)

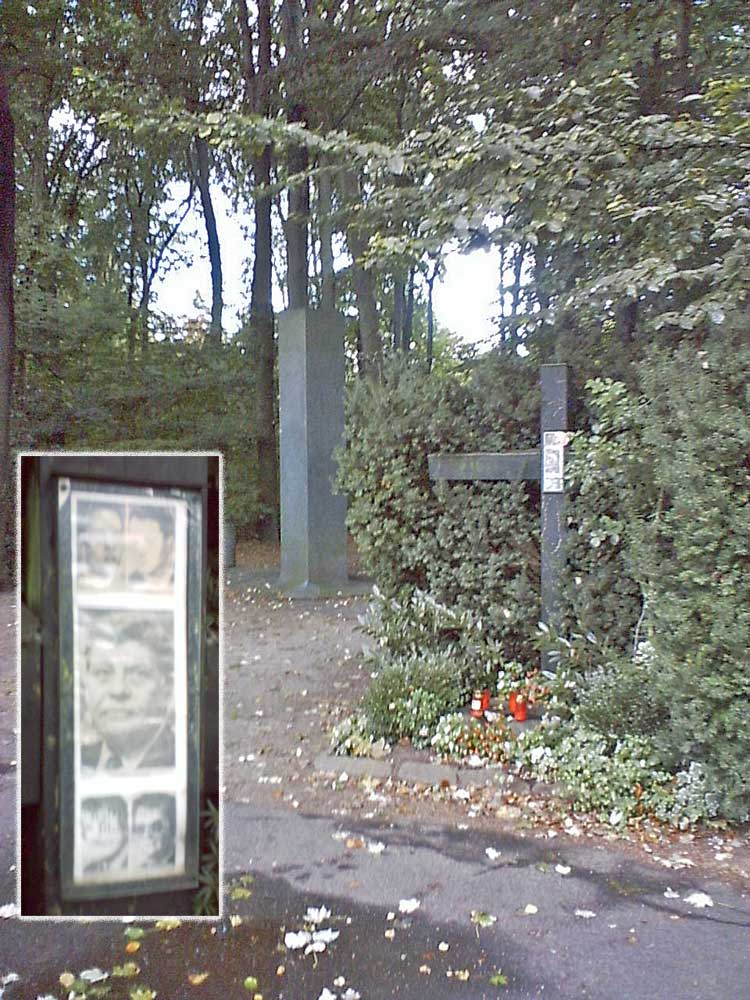
Memorial in Cologne

German industrial leader and former Nazi SS officer Hanns Martin Schleyer was kidnapped on 5 September 1977, by the Red Army Faction (RAF), also known as Baader-Meinhof Gang, in Cologne, West Germany. It was intended to force the West German government to release Andreas Baader and three other RAF members being held at the Stammheim Prison near Stuttgart. Later, Lufthansa Flight 181 was hijacked and abducted to Somalia to support the terrorist demands. West German GSG9 forces liberated the hostages on 18 October 1977, this made the news on radio, after which three RAF leaders died in prison. Hanns Martin Schleyer was killed after being a hostage for 43 days.

== Events ==
=== Kidnapping ===
Schleyer's abduction was planned by Siegfried Haag, but he was arrested in 1976, so his replacement, Brigitte Mohnhaupt, carried out the abduction.

On 5 September 1977, an RAF "commando unit" attacked the chauffeured car carrying former Nazi SS officer Schleyer, then president of the German employers' association, in Cologne, just after the car had turned right from Friedrich-Schmidt-Strasse into Vincenz-Statz-Strasse. His driver, Heinz Marcisz, 41, was forced to brake when a baby carriage suddenly appeared in the street in front of them. The police escort vehicle behind them was unable to stop in time, and crashed into Schleyer's car.

Peter-Jürgen Boock and Sieglinde Hofmann had pushed the carriage on the street to appear as if they were friends meeting with a baby. After the car crash, about six masked RAF members jumped out of a yellow Mercedes parked next to the carriage and sprayed machine gun bullets into the two vehicles. The gunfire killed Marcisz and a police officer, Roland Pieler, 20, who was seated in the backseat of Marcisz's car. The driver of the police escort vehicle, Reinhold Brändle, 41 and a third police officer, Helmut Ulmer, 24, who was in the second vehicle were also killed. The hail of bullets riddled over twenty bullet wounds into the bodies of Brändle and Pieler. Schleyer was then pulled out of the car and forced into the RAF assailants' own getaway van.

=== Imprisonment and killing ===
Schleyer was hidden in a highrise in Erftstadt (Liblar) near Cologne. The police came very close to finding him, but due to lack of internal communication did not rescue him. Several local police officers were convinced that Schleyer was held in the aforementioned highrise close to the autobahn, and one investigator had rung the doorbell of the apartment in question. However, the crisis center of the federal police did not act on this, and rebuffed follow-up calls due to lack of capacity.

The RAF demanded that the government release imprisoned members of their group. The government refused to give into RAF's demands or negotiate aside from strategical negotiations, hoping that the police would manage to free Schleyer in the meantime. The RAF sent the government a picture of Schleyer alive, in captivity, on 8 October 1977.

On 13 October, the Popular Front for the Liberation of Palestine hijacked Lufthansa Flight 181. Part of the hijackers demands were the release of the same imprisoned members of the RAF that Schleyer's kidnappers had made. On 18 October, the German counterterrorism unit GSG 9 ended the hijack in Somalia. Hearing of the outcome of the hijacking, the imprisoned RAF members Baader, Gudrun Ensslin and Jan-Carl Raspe died in an event known as the Stammheim Death Night. After Schleyer's kidnappers received the news of the death of their imprisoned comrades, Schleyer was taken from Brussels, Belgium on 18 October 1977, and shot dead en route to Mulhouse, France, where his body was left in the trunk of a green Audi 100 on the rue Charles Péguy.

=== Investigation ===
On 9 September 2007, former RAF member Peter-Jürgen Boock mentioned that the RAF members Rolf Heissler and Stefan Wisniewski were responsible for Schleyer's death.

Schleyer's widow, Waltrude Schleyer, campaigned against clemency for his kidnappers and other members of the RAF. She died on 21 March 2008, in Stuttgart.
