= Mittelstand =

Small and medium-sized enterprises in German-speaking countries

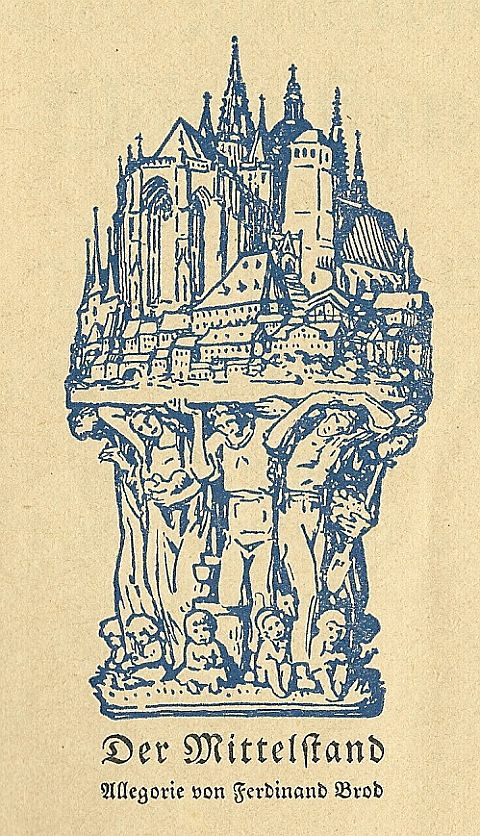
Representation of the supporting role of the Mittelstand in Walter Wilhelms German: „Mission des Mittelstandes" (Mission of the Mittelstand, 1925)

Mittelstand (German: [ˈmɪtl̩ˌʃtant]; composed of Mittel- for "middle" (adjectivally) and Stand for "class") commonly refers to a group of stable business enterprises in Germany, Austria and Switzerland that have proved particularly successful in enduring economic change and turbulence. The term is difficult to translate and may cause confusion for non-Germans. It is usually defined as a statistical category of small and medium-sized enterprises (SMEs; German: kleine und mittlere Unternehmen or German: KMU) with annual revenues up to 50 million Euro and a maximum of 500 employees.

However, the term is not officially defined or self-explanatory, so the English expression "small and medium-sized enterprises" is not necessarily equivalent to the Mittelstand. In fact, even larger and often family-owned firms claim to be part of the Mittelstand, such as Robert Bosch, based on the Mittelstand's positive connotations. The term Mittelstand generally applies to mid-sized firms with shared management practices. In Britain different terms have been devised by the media to describe their own mittelstand companies, such as Brittelstand.

Ludwig Erhard, the Economics Minister who crafted post-war West Germany's economic miracle (German: Wirtschaftswunder) warned against reducing the Mittelstand to a mere quantitative definition, but instead emphasized more qualitative characteristics which embody the German Mittelstand, as it is "much more of an ethos and a fundamental disposition of how one acts and behaves in society."

== Defining the term Mittelstand ==
The German word Stand refers to an estate, from the medieval model of society, under which a person's position was defined by birth or occupation. There were three principal levels: the upper one being the aristocracy, the middle one – the free bourgeoisie of the cities (the Mittelstand), and the lower one the peasants. Today, the term is used with two meanings. The first refers to small and medium-sized enterprises (SME; German, kleine und mittlere Unternehmen or KMU), as defined by number of employees and turnover. The second meaning refers to any family-run or -owned business (not necessarily a SME).(Note that the correct term to describe households of middling income would be Mittelschicht, with the English translation middle class.)

As Stand (estate) addresses a group, single Mittelstand-companies are often called Mittelständler.

=== Characterization ===
Business historians define various traits associated with Mittelstand firms, such as:

- Family ownership or family-like corporate culture
- Generational continuity
- Long-term focus
- Independence
- Nimbleness
- Emotional attachment
- Investment into the workforce
- Flexibility
- Lean hierarchies
- Innovativeness
- Customer focus
- Social responsibility
- Strong regional ties

A publication on Mittelstand firms by Venohr, Fear and Witt (2015) highlights: "These companies are predominantly run by classic 'owner-entrepreneurial families' (Unternehmerfamilien) seeking to sustain the business by instituting a core ideology of longevity, conservative long-term financing and operating practices." The Mittelstand acts as a counterpoint to a singular focus on shareholder value and dispersed investor-oriented shareholding. Another and more recent publication by David Audretsch, Erik Lehmann and Julian Schenkenhofer underlines that "[t]here are between six and 14 characteristics distinguishing a Mittelstand company, ranging from small size to governance (family ownership), human resource relations, linkages to the local community, finance and long-term orientation, among other things. Firm size, i.e. being classified as an SME, is just one among multiple key salient characteristics"

== The Mittelstand explained ==
Mittelstand companies are "highly focused, achieving unprecedented efficiencies by designing a business model with a razor-thin focus and learning to do the one thing really well"; then to "compensate for their razor-thin focus . . . they diversify internationally and enjoy great economies of scale." Mittelstand companies benefit from Germany's apprenticeship system, which provides highly skilled workers; and there is a "collaborative spirit that generally exists between employer and employees . . . . In the post-reunification recession, it seemed only natural to German workers to offer flexibility on wages and hours in return for greater job security."

Many Mittelstand companies are export-oriented. They focus on innovative and high-value manufactured products and occupy worldwide niche market leadership positions in numerous B2B segments. They are typically privately owned and often based in small, rural communities. Many of the successful Mittelstand companies combine a cautious and long-term-oriented approach to business with the adoption of modern management practices, such as employing outside professional management, and implementing lean manufacturing practices and total quality management. The Mittelstand emphasis on long-term profitability stands in contrast to the public corporations of many countries (including German public corporations) which face quarterly or annual pressure to meet expectations.

=== Germany's business 'landscape' and the role of the Mittelstand ===
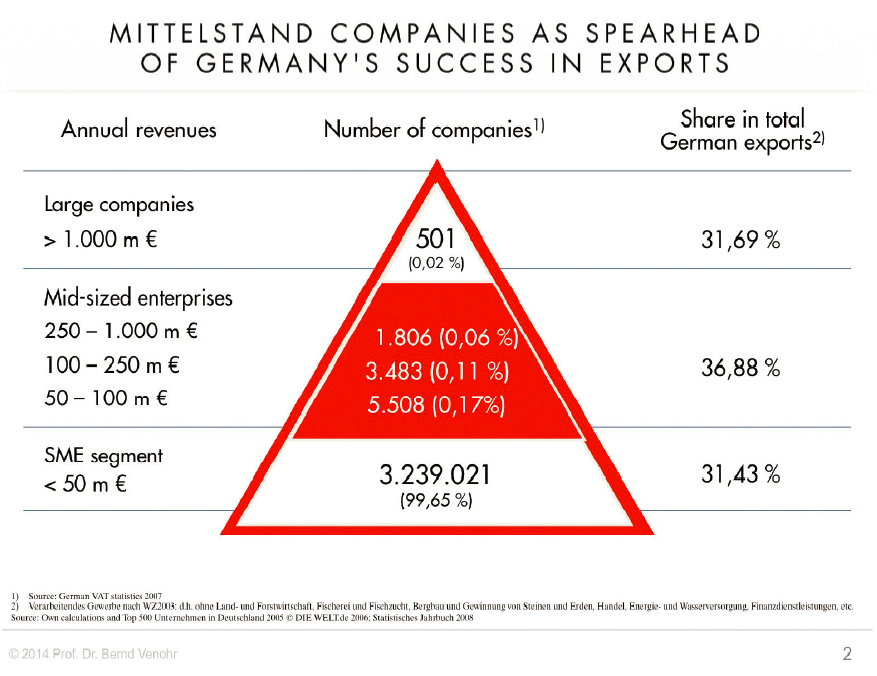
Germany's business landscape, showing that over 99% of German firms are Mittelstand firms but not necessarily all are SMEs

Due to the broad set of values which define the Mittelstand, Venohr, Fear & Witt (2015) divide Germany's 'business landscape' into three distinct categories of Mittelstand firms:

1. 'Classic' SME-type Mittelstand firms, which account for 99% of German firms (revenue below 50 million EUR).
2. 'Upper'-sized Mittelstand firms, which account for 0.34% of German firms (revenues between 50 million EUR up to 1 billion EUR).
3. Large corporations, which account for 0.02% of German firms (revenues over 1 billion EUR) and are more well-known companies, including the DAX 30 companies.

This pyramid shows that over 99% of German firms are Mittelstand firms but 0.34% depart from the classic small and medium-sized enterprise (SMEs) definition. The two categories of 'classic' and 'upper' Mittelstand firms in Germany account for 68% of Germany's exports. In comparison, Germany's larger corporations generate 32% of Germany's exports. The 'upper'-sized Mittelstand firms (revenues between 50 million EUR and 1 billion EUR) form a unique and distinctive group, as they are the most export-oriented group of firms in Germany's business landscape contributing significantly to Germany's sustained export success. As such, Mittelstand firms clearly form the backbone of the German economy.

The Mittelstand is not a rigid economic entity. On the contrary, Germany's liberal economic order, which is also subject to international competition, is constantly leading to structural changes which in turn influence the composition and characteristics of the corporate landscape. In the past several years, an increase of very small units can be observed: the so-called "solo self-employed." These are business start-ups that are not designed to grow into a small or larger business over time. Instead, such entrepreneurs will act permanently as individuals.

New forms of cooperation ("changing networks") have also emerged in the recent past. Depending on the project requirements, teams of independent agents form, each contributing their own specific skills and competences and thus work together efficiently. However, these entrepreneurs usually do not feel like they apply to the term "Mittelstand," as do start-ups that have not been on the market for at least three years. On the other hand, the affinity of small and medium-sized enterprises for one another increases with company size and age; the older and larger the companies, the more they identify themselves as small and medium-sized enterprises. However, among those companies that consider themselves to be medium-sized, according to the IfM Bonn (Institute for Management in Bonn) definition, one in seven is no longer included because they no longer fulfill the criterion of "ownership and management in one hand."

As a result of continuing globalization and worldwide corporations, SMEs in Germany were increasingly under competitive pressure. In order to compensate for the resulting disadvantages, more and more medium-sized companies have joined forces in recent decades to form co-operative partnerships. As a single member of a group of companies, the respective family-owned company retains entrepreneurial independence, but through joint inter-company activities it can gain a market position that only large companies could otherwise offer. Today's groups are regional, national and even international. The inter-company cooperation of the group is usually organized from a legally independent center and covers a variety of areas such as purchasing, marketing, logistics, IT solutions, financing services, consulting or training and so on. In Germany, around 250,000 companies from around 45 different branches of trade, craft trades and the service industry are currently grouped together, resulting in around 400 groups. 320 of these groups were formed through the Central Federation of Industrial Associations e.V. (German: Zentralverband Gewerblicher Verbundgruppen or ZGV) based in Berlin, Brussels and Cologne.

The importance of small and medium-sized enterprises is also evident from the fact that more than 160,000 small and medium-sized enterprises with about 4.3 million employees have organized themselves in the Federal Association of SMEs (BVMW). The focus of the association's work is creating network, organizing events and political advocacy.

=== Geographical distribution ===
According to an article published in the journal German: Die Deutsche Wirtschaft (The German Economy), the most important medium-sized enterprises—using absolute figures—are in North Rhine Westphalia at over 22%, followed by Bavaria (21%) and Baden-Württemberg (17%). The lowest ranking performers are Bremen, Saarland and Mecklenburg-Vorpommern, each with an approximate share of 1%. However, when assessed based on size by population, the city states of Hamburg and Bremen lead with 185 and 182 large medium-sized enterprises per 1 million inhabitants, respectively. The larger states of Bavaria and Baden-Württemberg follow close behind with 163 and 159 major medium-sized enterprises, respectively. The article also mentions the cities of Hamburg (329 enterprises), Berlin (227) and Munich (188) with the highest so-called "top middle class enterprises" ranking.

=== Mittelstand's main sectors ===
Germany's Mittelstand is heavily concentrated in:

- machinery
- auto parts
- chemicals
- electrical equipment

=== Management model "Made in Germany" ===
The Mittelstand model is most specifically defined in the 2015 publication The Best of German Mittelstand, which summarizes the distinct management model that "dovetails strategy, leadership and governance principles, with core processes in a unique blend, creating a finely tuned process":

1. Strategy: Global niche dominance
2. Governance: 'Enlightened' family capitalism
3. World class performance in core processes
4. Locational advantages: The German microeconomic business environment

=== Financial success of the Mittelstand ===
Small and medium-sized enterprises (SMEs) are financially well-positioned. According to studies by IfM Bonn and the University of Siegen in 2016, their equity ratio has been rising steadily for years. At the same time, SME liabilities to banks are falling in relation to their total assets. For the first time, small and medium-sized enterprises as a whole have a higher equity ratio than large companies. Only micro-enterprises continue to have lower capitalization despite high growth rates. One reason for this development lies in the stricter requirements under Basel II or III. To prevent their debt conditions from deteriorating, many small and medium-sized enterprises—as well as the larger family businesses—have increased their equity capital through retained earnings. This was also positively supported by the reduction in corporate taxes. At the same time, many small and medium-sized enterprises are reducing supplier credits and short-term bank liabilities.

Although SMEs continue to prefer bank loans, despite alternative means of financing, the importance of equity financing is likely to increase. For example, almost all companies will have to face increasing digitization with additional investment in information technologies to maintain their future competitiveness. However, to protect bank loans, IT technologies are not well suited due to the company-specific solutions and the generally high loss of value.

== Prospect of German Mittelstand ==
=== Industrie 4.0 ===
While the Mittelstand has served the German economy well since World War II, it is now faced with questions about how it will adapt to the digital revolution of the 21st century. Many of the industrial machines produced by the Mittelstand are quickly being connected to the Internet of Things (IoT), from manufacturing equipment that can warn owners when material is low to cars that are connected to digital entertainment systems. Strides have recently been made by firms such as Trumpf, which in October 2015 unveiled a digital platform called Axoom that can connect machines built by Trumpf and others to collect data that can be used to help firms improve their operating efficiency.

Germany's National Academy of Science and Engineering (Acatech) has addressed the challenge by introducing the concept of "Industrie 4.0" in 2013, calling for German manufacturing firms to enter the IT revolution by "consistently integrating information and communication technology into its traditional high-tech strategies so that it can become the leading supplier of smart manufacturing technologies."

The cause of Industrie 4.0 has been taken up by the German government and was a favorite theme of Chancellor Angela Merkel. The government has invested 200 million euros in Industrie 4.0 research. With this policy, the government seeks to create test beds for new ideas in industry and to convince the smaller Mittelstand firms to take up the cause of digitization.

=== Competition from China ===
During the 2020s, the Mittelstand have faced a strong downturn due to competition from China. Companies from China have started to close the quality gap with Germany's Mittelstand, while simultaneously offering prices that reach as half as those given by German companies. The competition has led to widespread job cuts and declining sales among the Mittelstand.

== Britain's Mittelstand ==
The Mittelstand in Britain, sometimes called the Brittelstand or UK Mittelstand (McMittelstand in Scotland), plays as important a role to the UK economy as it does in Germany. Figures from the British government state that they employed 14.4 million people in the U.K. in 2013. Furthermore, the European Commission's performance review of UK in 2013 estimated their gross value added at 473 billion euros ($595.4 billion) or 49.8 percent of the U.K. economy. The Confederation of British Industry (CBI), has long urged for the backing of the British Mittelstand. Help to grow schemes have been invested to help the British Mittelstand to grow as a result it has since been growing rapidly and in some cases has outpaced its European rivals.

While continuing to grow, a recent study which performed a comparison between German and British successful mid-cap companies suggests that British firms are far more short-term oriented in terms of management and policy raising the question whether the UK Mittelstand can endure over time in the same manner as the German equivalent, something the British government hopes to work on by embracing a longer term place.
