= Nicola Leibinger-Kammüller =

German businesswoman (born 1959)

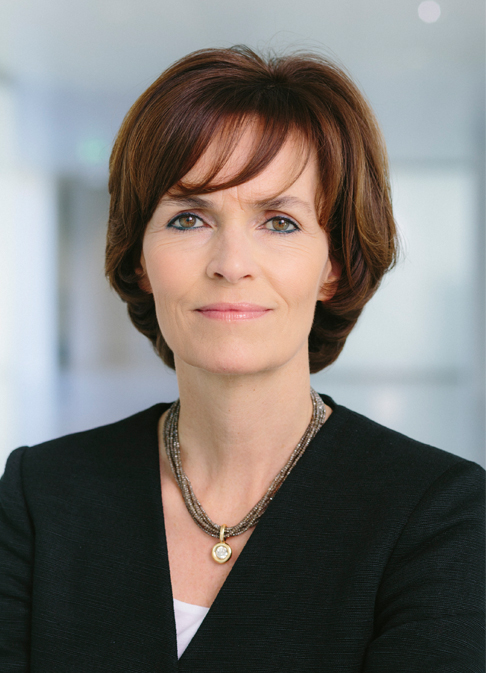
- Born: Nicola Leibinger; December 15, 1959 (age 66); Wilmington, Ohio, U.S.
- Occupations: Chief Executive Officer (CEO), President and Chairwoman of the Group Management Board
- Years active: 1985 – Present

Nicola Leibinger-Kammüller, born Leibinger (born December 15, 1959), is an American-born German businesswoman. She is the president and chairwoman of the Managing Board of the Trumpf GmbH + Co. KG, of which she has been a member since 2003, after having joined the company in 1985 as a public relations and branding specialist.

== Early life and education ==
Leibinger-Kammüller is the daughter of Berthold Leibinger. She holds a doctorate in philology, having studied German, English and Japanese studies in University of Freiburg, University of Vermont and ETH Zurich. She is a dual citizen of Germany and the United States by the virtue of her birth in Ohio.

== Career ==
Leibinger-Kammüller worked in different executive positions for Trumpf, starting in 1984 in the press and public relations department. She worked for Trumpf in Japan for two years, and became managing director of the Berthold Leibinger Foundation in 1992. She was made executive vice-president of Trumpf in 2003, and president and a director of the main board in 2005. She is responsible for the strategic development of the company, corporate communication, brand management, real estate management and sustainable business, legal affairs, M+A as well as internal risk management. She also has the regional responsibility for China.

Leibinger-Kammüller was a member of the Council for Innovation and Growth and is in the Scientific Commission of the German Council of Science and Humanities. In addition to her role at Trumpf, she also holds, or has held, various board memberships.

=== Corporate boards ===
- Die Zeit, Member of the Editorial Board (since 2020)
- Landesbank Baden-Württemberg (LBBW), Member of the Advisory Board
- Allensbach Institute, Member of the Board of Trustees
- Siemens AG, Member of the Supervisory Board (2008–2021)
- Voith, Member of the Supervisory Board (2008–2018)
- Lufthansa, Member of the Supervisory Board (2008–2016)
- Axel Springer SE, Member of the Supervisory Board (2010–2019)

=== Non-profit organizations ===
- Federation of German Industries (BDI), Member of the Presidium (since 2021)
- Berlin-Brandenburg Academy of Sciences and Humanities, Member of the Senate
- Cultural Foundation of the Federal States, Member of the Board of Trustees
- Deutsche Nationalstiftung, Member of the Board of Trustees (since 2017)
- Friends of the German Literature Archive Marbach, Chairwoman (since 2016)
- Technical University of Munich (TUM), Member of the Board of Trustees (since 2013)
- Berthold Leibinger Foundation, Chairwoman of the Board of Trustees
- Foundation for Family Businesses, Member of the Board of Trustees
- Fraunhofer Society, Member of the Senate
- Friedrich August von Hayek Foundation, Member of the Board of Trustees
- Max Planck Society, Member of the Senate
- Robert Bosch Stiftung, Member of the Board of Trustees
- Schule Schloss Salem, Member of the Board of Trustees
- Stifterverband für die Deutsche Wissenschaft, Member of the Board of Trustees
- University of Tübingen, Honorary Senator

== Political activities ==
Leibinger-Kammüller served as a CDU delegate to the Federal Convention for the purpose of electing the President of Germany in 2009 and 2010. In August 2012, she was part of Chancellor Angela Merkel's delegation on a state visit to China. During the Hannover Messe in April 2016, she was among the 15 German CEOs who were invited to a private dinner with President Barack Obama.

In April 2020, Leibinger-Kammüller was appointed by Minister-President Armin Laschet of North Rhine-Westphalia to a 12-member expert group to advise on economic and social consequences of the COVID-19 pandemic in Germany.

== Personal life ==
Leibinger-Kammüller has been married since 1984 and has four children.

== Recognition ==
- 2006: The German Fairness Prize for merits with regards to "a fair and transparent company and management culture", together with her father, Berthold Leibinger, her brother, Peter Leibinger, and her husband, Mathias Kammüller
- 2008: The Order of Merit of the Federal Republic of Germany for merits in the areas of business, education and society, and for her civic commitment
- 2011: The Hans-Peter Stihl Award for contributions to the development of the Stuttgart region
- 2011: The Ring of Honor of the city of Garbsen
- 2012: Knight of the Legion of Honour
- 2014: McCloy Award
- 2015: German Leadership Award
- 2015: The Grand Gold Medal of Honor of Upper Austria
- 2015: The Progressive Thinker Award of the Plansecur Company Group
- 2015: The Ludwig Erhard Prize for Economic Journalism
- 2016: Member of the Handelsblatt Hall of Fame der Familienunternehmen
- 2017: Hanns Martin Schleyer Prize
- 2017: Lutherrose
- 2019: Ehrenpreis für Familienunternehmen

== Publications ==
- Awakening and Resignation: Erich Kästners Late Works 1945 – 1967, Dissertation, University of Zürich 1988.
