= Ulrich Grillo =

German entrepreneur

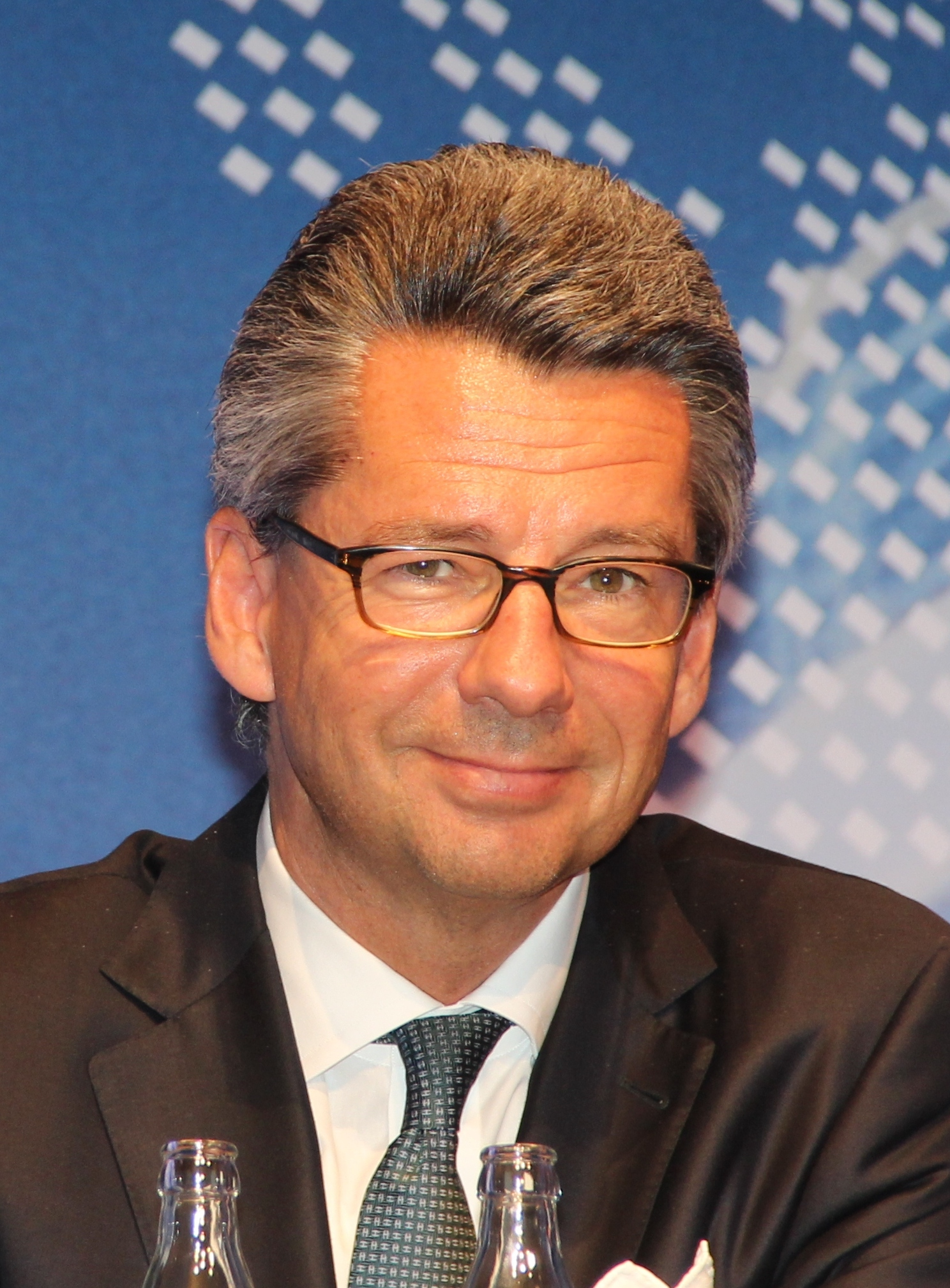
- Grillo in 2013
- Born: 2 September 1959 (age 67); Cologne, North Rhine-Westphalia, Germany
- Education: Westfälische Wilhelms-Universität
- Occupation: Entrepreneur
- Organization: Rheinmetall AG (Chairman of the Supervisory Board)
- Known for: Former president of the Federation of German Industries
- Spouse: Jutta Roosen
- Children: 2

Ulrich Grillo (born 2 September 1959) is a German businessman, the former president of the Federation of German Industries (BDI), and the chairman of Rheinmetall.

== Early life and education ==
After completing his high school diploma in 1978, Grillo served in the military from 1978 to 1979. From 1980 to 1982, he trained as a bank clerk at Deutsche Bank. Starting in 1982, he studied business administration at the Westfälische Wilhelms-Universität in Münster, graduating in 1987 with a degree in business administration (Diplom-Kaufmann).

== Career ==
Grillo worked as an audit supervisor for the accounting and consulting firm Arthur Andersen in Frankfurt, later joining the multinational consultancy A.T. Kearney in Düsseldorf.

From 1993 to 2001, Grillo held various positions at the defence company Rheinmetall AG, starting as head of controlling for the corporate management holding. In 1996, he became director with overall power of attorney, overseeing the central planning and controlling division. By 1998, he was granted full power of attorney (Generalvollmacht).

From July 1999 to July 2001, Grillo was a board member responsible for finance and controlling at Rheinmetall DeTec AG, Ratingen. Concurrently, from November 1999 to April 2001, he was chairman and managing director of STN Atlas Elektronik GmbH, Bremen, a subsidiary of Rheinmetall DeTec AG. In December 1999, he was appointed deputy chairman of the board at Rheinmetall DeTec.

In 2001, Grillo joined the board of his family-owned Grillo Group, based in Duisburg. During the 2021/2022 fiscal year, the Grillo Group generated €862.3 million in revenue. Grillo's family branch holds approximately 10% of Grillo-Werke AG, a share he purchased upon joining the company by taking on debt. His Ulrich Grillo Beteiligungsgesellschaft acquired nearly 10% of company shares for €5.7 million, though he remains €2.9 million in debt. Initially, his father's share of the company was less than 2%. Since 2004, Grillo has been managing the Grillo Group and Grillo-Werke.

Starting in 2005, Grillo focused on securing critical raw materials, such as rare earths, to ensure supply chain security for German industry. He successfully engaged 12 DAX-listed companies, including BASF, ThyssenKrupp, VW, and BMW, raising awareness of resource issues across industry and politics. Grillo continues to advocate for the significance of industry in policymaking.

From November 2006 to the end of 2012, Grillo was president of the Wirtschaftsvereinigung Metalle, representing Germany's non-ferrous metal industry. In 2006, he also became chairman of the BDI's raw materials committee. By 2011, he had risen to one of nine BDI vice presidents. In November 2012, Grillo was elected to succeed Hans-Peter Keitel as president of the BDI, assuming the position on January 1, 2013. He handed over the role to Dieter Kempf at the end of 2016.

Grillo participated in the 2013 Bilderberg Conference in Hertfordshire.

He has been on the supervisory board of the steel and metal trading company Klöckner & Co. He is chairman of the supervisory board at Rheinmetall AG and deputy chairman of the supervisory board at E.ON SE.

== Recognition ==
- 2008: Order of Merit of North Rhine-Westphalia
- 2017: Walter Scheel Prize
- 2020: Cross of Merit 1st Class, Federal Republic of Germany

== Personal life ==
Grillo is married, has two daughters, and enjoys playing golf.
