= Hermann Brauneck =

German physician and SA general (1894–1942)

Inspector, SA-Medical Inspectorate Supreme SA Leadership (OSAF)
- In office 1 February 1942 – 27 July 1942

Chief, OSAF Health Services
- In office 1 November 1937 – 27 July 1942

Chief, OSAF Main Office for Health
- In office 1 November 1937 – 31 January 1942

Chief, OSAF Medical Office
- In office 1 February 1937 – 31 October 1937
- Preceded by: Emil Ketterer

Medical Officer SA-Gruppe Berlin-Brandenburg
- In office 15 February 1936 – 31 January 1937

Group Doctor SA-Gruppe Nordsee
- In office 1 January 1933 – 14 February 1936

Other positions
- 1936–1937: Deputy Chairman, Committee for the Protection of German Blood
- 1934–1939: Judge, Hereditary Health Court

Personal details
- Born: 19 December 1894 Sulzbach, Rhine Province, Kingdom of Prussia, German Empire
- Died: 27 July 1942 (aged 47) Kerch, Crimea, Soviet Union
- Cause of death: Airstrike
- Party: Nazi Party
- Education: University of Freiburg
- Profession: Physician; Naval officer
- Civilian awards: Brunswick Rally Badge; Honor Badge of the German Red Cross

Military service
- Allegiance: German Empire; Weimar Republic; Nazi Germany
- Branch/service: Imperial German Navy; Reichsmarine; Kriegsmarine
- Years of service: 1913–1920; 1939–1942
- Rank: Leutnant zur See; Geschwaderarzt
- Battles/wars: World War I World War II
- Military awards: Iron Cross, 1st and 2nd class War Merit Cross, 2nd class without swords

Hermann Max-Gustav Brauneck (19 December 1894 – 27 July 1942) was a German naval officer, physician and member of the paramilitary Sturmabteilung who rose to the rank of SA-Obergruppenführer. He held several high-level medical staff positions in the Supreme SA Leadership (OSAF) and in the Nazi Party. He was involved in administering the Nazi racial policies and served as a judge on the Hereditary Health Court, deciding whether people considered to have genetic disorders should be forcibly sterilized. Serving as a military doctor in the Kriegsmarine during the Second World War, he was killed in a Russian airstrike on the eastern front.

== Early life and education ==
Brauneck was born the son of a physician in Sulzbach, then located in Prussia's Rhine Province. He attended Volksschule and a Realgymnasium, obtaining his Abitur in 1913. He entered the Imperial German Navy in April 1913 as a sea cadet and underwent training at the Mürwik Naval School. He was posted aboard the protected cruiser SMS Hertha and took part in a training cruise to Canada, Mexico and the Antilles before returning to Kiel in March 1914. After the outbreak of the First World War, Brauneck was assigned to the battleship SMS Deutschland where he served as a watch officer and participated in the Battle of Jutland. In August 1917, he was transferred to become an adjutant and a wireless telegraphy officer aboard the SMS Friedrich der Grosse. He then served as a staff officer in Battleship Squadron IV until the end of the war in November 1918, having earned the Iron Cross 1st and 2nd class.

Brauneck remained in the peacetime Reichsmarine of the Weimar Republic until he was discharged on 21 February 1920 with the rank of Oberleutnant zur See. He then studied medicine at the University of Freiburg and received a Doctor of Medicine degree in 1922. From 1922 to 1930, he continued training as a doctor, and then worked in Bremen as a practicing surgeon from 1930 to 1933, also obtaining a sports medicine certificate during that time.

== Career in the Sturmabteilung (SA) ==
Brauneck joined the Nazi Party (membership number 496,265) at the Bremen Ortsgruppe (local group) on 1 April 1931 and, on 1 August of the same year, joined its paramilitary unit, the Sturmabteilung (SA). He served as the battalion doctor to Sturmbann II of Standarte 75 in Bremen until December. During this time, he participated in the mass SA rally in Braunschweig on 17–18 October, earning the Brunswick Rally Badge. On 1 January 1932, he advanced to become the regimental doctor of Standarte 75 and, exactly one year later, moved up to group doctor of SA-Gruppe Nordsee, also headquartered in Bremen.

Following the Nazi seizure of power in January 1933, Brauneck obtained two government posts: leader of the health office in Bremen and president of the Bremen Health Authority. The following year, he was named to several regional Party posts that he would hold until February 1936, as the leader of both the Public Health Office and the Office for Racial Politics in Gau Weser-Ems, as a Gauredner (Gau speaker) and as the Gau chairman of the National Socialist German Doctors' League. Brauneck also served as a judge on a Hereditary Health Court, a body established by the Law for the Prevention of Hereditarily Diseased Offspring, which decided whether people considered to have genetic disorders should be forcibly sterilized.

In February 1936, Brauneck was transferred from Bremen to Berlin to become a medical officer for special assignments in SA-Gruppe Berlin-Brandenburg. The same month, he was appointed by Adolf Hitler as deputy chairman of the Reich Committee for the Protection of German Blood, under chairman Wilhelm Stuckart. This committee, established by the implementing regulations to the Law for the Protection of German Blood and German Honour, approved or denied marriage requests between Aryan Germans and non-Aryan Mischling. The committee denied these requests with such regularity that it stopped meeting within a year and the determinations were issued by a single official. In May 1936, Brauneck presented two lectures on the Nuremberg Laws as an instructor at the Führerschule der Deutschen Ärzteschaft (Leadership School of German Medicine) in Alt Rehse. On 26 June 1936, he was appointed as a Ministerialrat (ministerial councilor) in the Reich Ministry of the Interior. Also that month, Brauneck was named a Hauptstellenleiter (main department leader) in the Nazi Party's Main Office for Public Health and a Mitarbeiter in the Racial Policy Office of the Party Reichsleitung (national leadership). In September 1936, he delivered another lecture at Alt Rehse, entitled Practical Application of the Nuremberg Racial Laws. Between 1936 and 1937, he was named as the healthcare advisor for the Nuremberg rallies.

On 1 February 1937, Brauneck became acting chief of the Medical Office at the Supreme SA Leadership (OSAF) succeeding Emil Ketterer, an appointment that was made permanent on 1 May. On 1 November 1937, he was named chief of the OSAF Main Office for Health and chief of SA Health Services, a post he retained until his death. He was promoted to SA-Sanitats-Obergruppenführer on 9 November 1937 and was awarded the Honor Badge of the German Red Cross in January 1938. On 1 February 1942, he was appointed an inspector in the SA-Medical Inspectorate. Apart from his SA career, Brauneck also attempted to enter elective politics and unsuccessfully sought a seat as a deputy to the Reichstag in April 1938.

== War service and death ==
Just prior to the start of the Second World War, Brauneck reentered military service with the Kriegsmarine in August 1939 as a Marinestabarzt of reserves. Starting during the Polish campaign, he served as a surgeon at the naval hospital in Stralsund until February 1940. From May to July of that year, he was posted aboard the battleship Gneisenau. For the remainder of 1940 and through 1941, he worked as a surgeon at naval hospitals in Rotterdam and Bordeaux, being promoted to Marineoberstabsarzt on 1 February 1941. For his war service, he was awarded the War Merit Cross, 2nd class. In spring 1942, he was transferred to the eastern front where he was the chief doctor at the Naval Tent Hospital No. 1. On 27 July 1942, Brauneck was killed in Kerch during a Soviet airstrike. He was granted a posthumous promotion to Geschwaderarzt (squadron doctor), a rank comparable to a Fregattenkapitän.

== Navy and SA ranks ==
Navy and SA ranks
Date	Rank
1 April 1913	Seekadett
3 April 1914	Fähnrich zur See
18 September 1915	Leutnant zur See
21 February 1920	Oberleutnant zur See
1 January 1932	SA-Standartenarzt
15 December 1932	SA-Sanitäts-Gruppenführer
9 November 1937	SA-Sanitäts-Obergruppenführer
August 1939	Marinestabsarzt
1 February 1941	Marineoberstabsarzt
> 27 July 1942	Geschwaderarzt (posthumous)

== Sources ==
- Campbell, Bruce (1998). The SA Generals and the Rise of Nazism. Lexington: University Press of Kentucky, ISBN 978-0-813-12047-8
- Evans, Richard J. (2005). The Third Reich in Power. New York: Penguin Press. ISBN 978-0-143-03790-3.
- Klee, Ernst (2007). Das Personenlexikon zum Dritten Reich. Wer war was vor und nach 1945. Frankfurt-am-Main: Fischer-Taschenbuch-Verlag. ISBN 978-3-596-16048-8.
- Miller, Michael D.; Schulz, Andreas (2015). Leaders of the Storm Troops. Vol. 1. Solihull, England: Helion & Company. ISBN 978-1-909-98287-1.
- Stockhorst, Erich (1985). 5000 Köpfe: Wer War Was im 3. Reich. Arndt. ISBN 978-3-887-41116-9.
