= Paul Hocheisen =

German military physician and SA general (1870–1944)

Honorary President, German Red Cross
- In office 1 January 1937 – 22 December 1944

Deputy President, German Red Cross
- In office 1 December 1933 – 19 December 1936
- Succeeded by: Ernst-Robert Grawitz

Inspector General of SA and SS Medical Services, Supreme SA Leadership (OSAF)
- In office 1 November 1933 – 31 January 1934
- Preceded by: Position created

Chief, OSAF Medical Office
- In office 21 November 1932 – 31 October 1933
- Preceded by: Position created
- Succeeded by: Emil Ketterer

Leader, OSAF Department of Medical Services
- In office 1 August 1930 – 12 September 1932

Political positions
- 1932–1944: Reichstag Deputy

Personal details
- Born: 27 May 1870 Beilstein, Kingdom of Württemberg, German Empire
- Died: 22 December 1944 (aged 74) Heidenheim an der Brenz, Württemberg, Nazi Germany
- Party: Nazi Party
- Education: Pépinière Medical-Surgical Academy for the Military; Royal Friedrich Wilhelm University of Berlin
- Profession: Physician; Military officer

Military service
- Allegiance: German Empire; Weimar Republic
- Branch/service: Army of Württemberg; Reichswehr
- Years of service: 1892–1929
- Rank: Generaloberstabsarzt
- Unit: Infantry Regiments 125 & 120; Grenadier Regiments 119 & 123; 5th Reichswehr Division; Gruppenkommando 2
- Battles/wars: World War I
- Awards: Iron Cross, 1st and 2nd class Order of the Württemberg Crown, Knight's Cross with swords Military Merit Order, Knight's Cross; Friedrich Order, 1st class Wound Badge

Paul Friedrich Karl Hocheisen (27 May 1870 – 22 December 1944) was a German physician and long-serving medical officer with the Army of Württemberg (1892–1918) and the Reichswehr (1919–1929). He then became a member of the Sturmabteilung (SA), rising to the rank of SA-Obergruppenführer and was the chief of the SA Medical Office in the Supreme SA Leadership. He served as the deputy president and the honorary president of the German Red Cross. He was also a Nazi Party politician and sat as a deputy in the Reichstag from 1932 until his death.

== Early life and education ==
Hocheisen was born the son of a medical doctor in Beilstein, Württemberg. He attended a Gymnasium in Stuttgart and received his Abitur in 1888. From 1888 to 1892 he studied medicine at the Pépinière Medical-Surgical Academy in Berlin. He also joined the student corps Suevo-Borussia. In 1889, he enlisted as a one-year volunteer with the 1st (Emperor Alexander) Guards Grenadiers of the Royal Prussian Army in Berlin. In 1892, he received his Doctor of Medicine degree from the Royal Friedrich Wilhelm University of Berlin (today, the Humboldt University of Berlin) and passed the state medical examination.

== Career as a military medical officer ==
In that same year, Hocheisen began a career as a medical officer in the Army of Württemberg. Over the next 26 years, he would go on to serve with Infantry Regiment 125, Grenadier Regiment 119, Grenadier Regiment 123, Infantry Regiment 120, and in the Württemberg War Ministry. In 1894, he passed his second state examination and was licensed as a doctor. In 1899, he passed the examination for admission to Württemberg's state medical service. This was followed by additional specialized training as a surgeon at the Karl-Olga Hospital in Stuttgart from 1900 to 1902. Between 1903 and 1906, he worked as a gynecological specialist at the women's clinic in Berlin's Charité.

During the First World War, Hocheisen served from 1914 to 1918 as a regimental and divisional medical officer with the 54th Reserve Division. He participated in many battles on the western front, and was severely wounded on 6 May 1916 by a gunshot to the neck and lung. By the end of the war he was highly decorated, having received the Iron Cross 1st and 2nd class, the Knight's Cross with swords of the Order of the Württemberg Crown, the Knight's Cross of the Military Merit Order, the Friedrich Order 1st class and the Wound Badge.

In 1919, Hocheisen remained in the military with the newly-established Reichswehr, where he initially was assigned to the Reich Defense Ministry until 1920. He then served until October 1926 as the divisional medical officer at the 5th Division in Wehrkreis (military district) V, headquartered in Stuttgart. He was transferred on 1 November 1926 to the post of group medical officer at Gruppenkommando (group command) 2 in Kassel that oversaw the three Wehrkreise in western and southern Germany. On 30 April 1929, Hocheisen retired from the army with the rank of brevet Generaloberstabsarzt (Senior Staff Surgeon General).

== Career in the Nazi Sturmabteilung ==
On 1 August 1929, Hocheisen joined the Nazi Party (membership number 145,058). On 1 July 1930, he became a member of its paramilitary unit, the Sturmabteilung (SA), with the rank of SA-Sanitäts-Oberführer and was assigned to the staff of the Supreme SA Leader. He was given the title of Reichsarzt der SA (SA Reich Physician) with the rank of SA-Sanitäts-Gruppenführer from 1 August of that year, and made leader of the Department of Medical Services in the quartermaster's office of the Supreme SA Leadership (OSAF). He was charged with organizing a health and medical service within the SA. The SA medical corps employed physicians, nurses, pharmacists and dentists. These services were necessitated by the fact that in the years before the Nazis came to power, SA meetings, rallies and street demonstrations often were accompanied by outbreaks of violence, resulting in many casualties.

In November 1932, Hocheisen had his position upgraded to chief of the Medical Office of the SA. On 20 April 1933, he was promoted to SA-Sanitäts-Obergruppenführer. In May 1933, Hocheisen was appointed the representative of the Reich Minister of the Interior, Wilhelm Frick, to the Office of the Commissioner for Volunteer Nursing. Also that year, he was made the Interior Minister's special representative for the regulation of Red Cross issues. On 1 November 1933, he was succeeded by Emil Ketterer as head of the SA Medical Office. At the same time, he was named to the newly-created post of Inspector General of SA and SS Medical Services.

In addition to his medical duties with the SA, Hocheisen also pursued a political career. In the July 1932 German parliamentary election, he was elected a Reichstag deputy for electoral constituency 28 (Dresden–Bautzen), and he subsequently served without interruption until his death in December 1944. From March 1933, he represented constituency 29 (Leipzig) and, from March 1936, constituency 15 (East Hanover).

== Army and SA ranks ==
Army and SA ranks
Date	Rank
18 August 1894	Assistenzarzt
14 November 1895	Oberarzt
31 May 1899	Stabsarzt
23 March 1910	Oberstabsarzt
1 October 1920	Generalarzt
1 November 1926	Generalstabsarzt
30 April 1929	brevet Generaloberstabsarzt
1 July 1930	SA-Sanitäts-Oberführer
1 August 1930	SA-Sanitäts-Gruppenführer
20 April 1933	SA-Sanitäts-Obergruppenführer

== German Red Cross executive ==
On 1 December 1933, Hocheisen was appointed deputy president of the German Red Cross (DRK). In January 1934, he was named first deputy to the Reich Commissioner for Volunteer Nursing in the Interior Ministry and, on 16 July 1934, he was made the OSAF head of liaison with the DRK. The nominal president of the DRK, Charles Edward, Duke of Saxe-Coburg and Gotha, was chiefly given ceremonial tasks, while Hocheisen managed the day-to-day business of the agency. He functioned as the effective leader of the DRK until the end of 1936. He then was replaced in his posts at the DRK and the Commission for Volunteer Nursing in favor of an SS officer nearly 30 years his junior, SS-Oberführer Ernst-Robert Grawitz, who would reorganize the DRK along Führerprinzip lines. Hocheisen was granted the title of honorary president of the DRK on 18 December 1936, and his resignation as deputy president became effective 1 January 1937. The official justification given was that he asked to be relieved of duty for reasons of health. There is little documented about Hocheisen from that point forward, and he died in Heidenheim an der Brenz in December 1944.

== Writings ==
- Die intravenösen Kollargolinjektionen bei Puerperalfieber, Berlin 1906.

== Sources ==
- Information about Paul Hocheisen in the Reichstag database
- Klee, Ernst (2007). Das Personenlexikon zum Dritten Reich. Wer war was vor und nach 1945. Frankfurt-am-Main: Fischer-Taschenbuch-Verlag. p. 260 ISBN 978-3-596-16048-8
- Lepage, Jean-Denis (2016). Hitler's Stormtroopers: The SA, The Nazi's Brownshirts, 1922–1945. Frontline Books. ISBN 978-1-399-07721-7.
- Miller, Michael D.; Schulz, Andreas (2015). Leaders of the Storm Troops. Vol. 1. Solihull, England: Helion & Company. ISBN 978-1-909-98287-1.
- Morgenbrod, Birgitt; Merkenich, Stephanie (1 January 2008). Das Deutsche Rote Kreuz unter der NS-Diktatur 1933-1945 [The German Red Cross under the Nazi Dictatorship 1933-1945] (in German). Brill Schöningh. doi:10.30965/9783657765294_013. ISBN 978-3-657-76529-4.
- Stockhorst, Erich (1985). 5000 Köpfe: Wer War Was im 3. Reich. Arndt. p. 201 ISBN 978-3-887-41116-9.
- Williams, Max (2015). SS Elite: The Senior Leaders of Hitler's Praetorian Guard. Vol. 1. Fonthill Media LLC. ISBN 978-1-781-55433-3.
