= Siegfried Russwurm =

German business executive (born 1963)

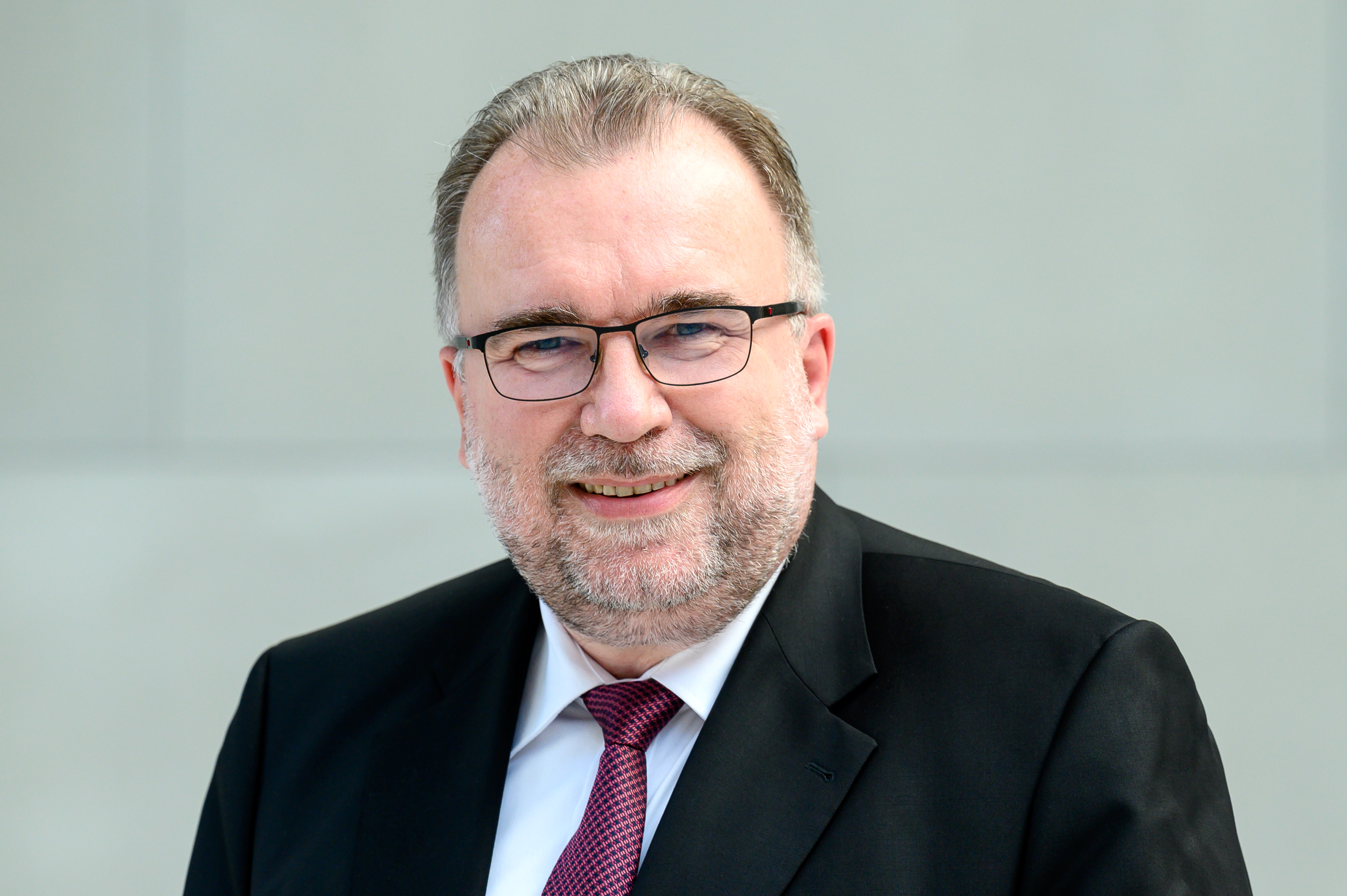
- Russwurm in 2020
- Born: June 27, 1963 (age 63); Marktgraitz, Germany
- Occupation: Business executive
- Known for: Former president of the Federation of German Industries (2021-2024)
- Spouse: Susanne Russwurm
- Children: 2

Siegfried Russwurm (born 27 June 1963) is a German business executive who was president of the Federation of German Industries (BDI) from 2021 to 2024. He has held a number of positions and is chairman of the supervisory board of Thyssenkrupp and Voith Group and a former member of the Siemens Executive Board.

== Early life and education ==
Russwurm grew up as the son of a working-class couple in Lichtenfels, Upper Franconia. He attended high school in his hometown and graduated from the University of Erlangen-Nuremberg in 1988 with a degree in production engineering.

In 1991, he completed his doctorate whilst serving as a research assistant at the chair of engineering mechanics, with a thesis focused on numerical simulation. He has been lecturing in mechatronics there since 2005 and has been an honorary professor of mechatronics since 2009.

== Career ==
In 1992, Russwurm joined Siemens at the Kemnath production site as a production planner and project manager in the Medical Technology Division. In 1999, he moved within the Group to Solna, Sweden, where he became head of the Electromedical Systems Business Line with sites in Sweden and the USA. In 2003, he moved to Siemens' Industrial Division and became head of the Motion Control Systems Business Line in the Automation and Drives Division.

In May 2006, he joined the Divisional Board of Siemens Medical Solutions.

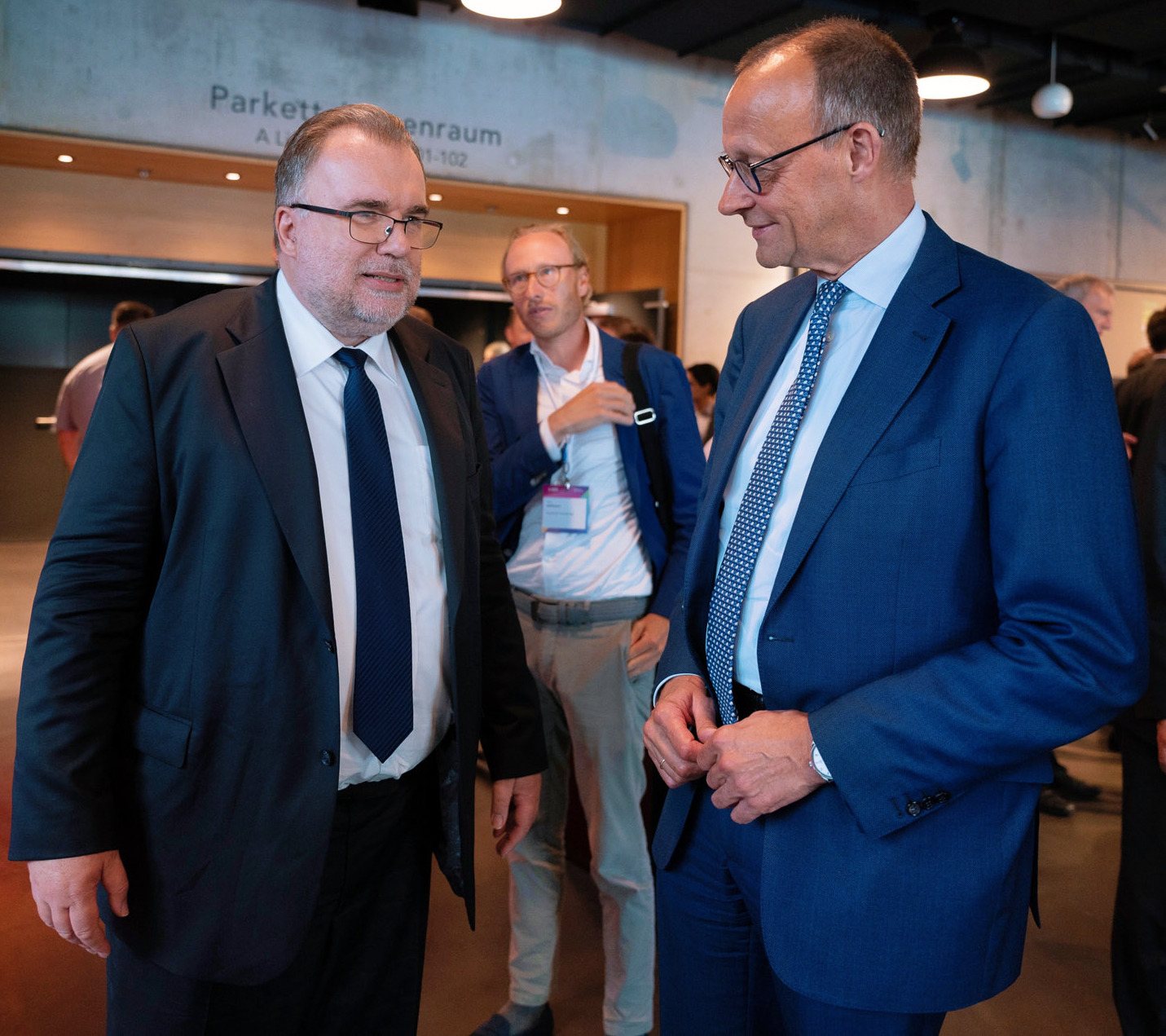
Russwurm with Friedrich Merz at the 2023 Industry Day

In January 2008, he was appointed to the Managing Board of Siemens AG, initially serving as Chief Human Resources Officer, with regional responsibility for Europe, the Middle East, Africa and the CIS. He left Siemens in March 2017. In 2010, he took over responsibility for the entire industrial business of the Siemens Group. Russwurm has also been a member of the supervisory board of Thyssenkrupp since April 2019. The FAZ newspaper described him as an ‘intellectual mastermind of Industry 4.0’.

In 2014, he took on the role of chief technology officer at Siemens and in 2015, he also assumed responsibility for the medical division.

Russwurm has been a member of the Shareholders' Committee of the Voith Group since March 2018. In March 2019, he took over as chairman of the supervisory board and Shareholders' Committee of Voith. At the beginning of October 2019, he was elected chairman of the supervisory board of Thyssenkrupp.

In June 2020, Dieter Kempf, then president of the Federation of German Industries (BDI), proposed Russwurm as his successor. In November 2020, the BDI General Assembly followed this proposal and elected Russwurm unanimously as BDI president. Russwurm took office on 1 January 2021 and was re-elected unanimously for a second term in November 2022. His second term of office ended at the end of 2024. He was succeeded as BDI President by Peter Leibinger.

== Other positions ==
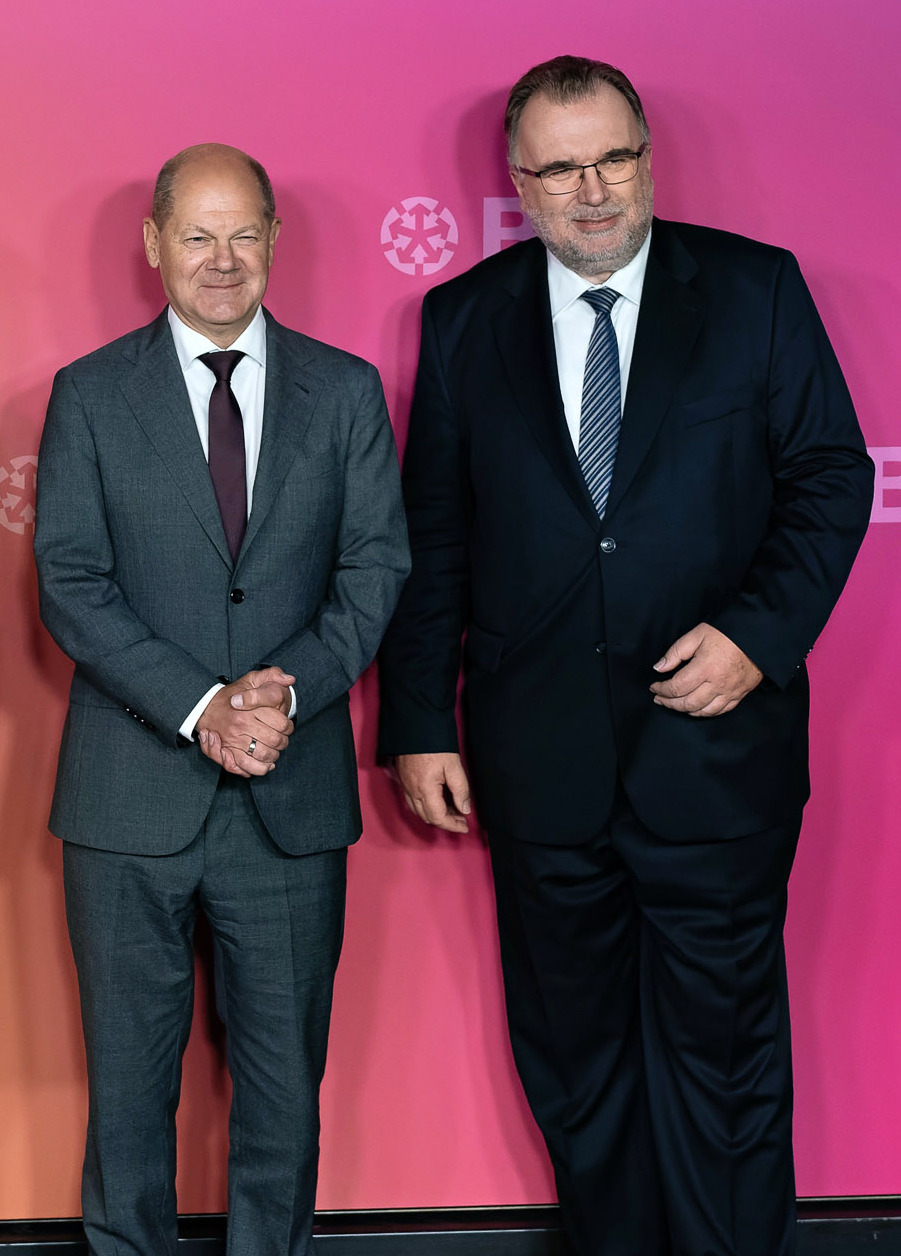
Russwurm with Federal Chancellor Olaf Scholz at the 2023 Industry Day

Siegfried Russwurm is a member of the executive committee and senator of the German Academy of Science and Engineering (acatech) and the board of the German-Swedish Chamber of Commerce. He was chairman of the North Africa-Middle East Initiative of German Industry (NMI) under the umbrella of the BDI, chairman of the Industry 4.0 platform of some BDI member associations, and a member of the board of the BDI member association of mechanical and plant engineering companies, VDMA.

As Chief Human Resources Officer and Labour Director at Siemens, he was a member of the executive committee of the Confederation of German Employers' Associations (BDA) from 2008 to 2010. Russwurm was also a member of the advisory board of Germany's largest meat company Tönnies, from 2017 to 2021, created as an arbitration body.

== Publications ==
- Siegfried Russwurm: Software: Die Zukunft der Industrie. In: Ulrich Sendler (Hrsg.): Industrie 4.0. Beherrschung der industriellen Komplexität mit SysLM. Springer, Heidelberg 2013, S. 21–36, ISBN 978-3-642-36917-9.
- als Hrsg., with Joachim Lang (Hrsg.): Die europäische Alternative: Unser Weg in Zeiten des globalen Umbruchs. Verlag Herder, Freiburg/Basel/Wien 2021, ISBN 978-3-451-39071-5.
- with Tanja Gönner (Hrsg.): Wie gestalten wir unsere Beziehungen zu China? Verlag Herder, Freiburg im Breisgau 2022, ISBN 978-3-451-03369-8.

== Personal life ==
In October 2022, RWTH Aachen University awarded him an honorary doctorate in engineering. From 2012 to 2017, Russwurm served as a member of the University Council and supported the successful application for the Cluster of Excellence ‘Internet of Production’.

He is married and has two grown-up children.
