= Hans Peter Stihl =

German industrialist (born 1932)

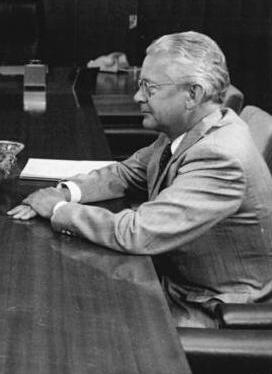
- Stihl at a meeting in 1989
- Born: April 18, 1932 (age 94); Stuttgart, Germany
- Occupation: Industrialist
- Known for: Head of power tool manufacturer Stihl from 1973 to 2002

Hans Peter Stihl (born 18 April 1932, in Stuttgart) is a German industrialist who was head of power tool manufacturing company Stihl from 1973 to 2002. He remained a board member until 2012. In 2006, he became Consul-General of Singapore. He is a member of the Robert Bosch Industrietreuhand.

Stihl was nominated by the Free Democratic Party as delegate to the Federal Conventions for the purpose of electing the President of Germany in 2022.

Stihl is honorary citizen of several German and Brazilian cities and has received numerous prizes, including the Grand Merit Cross with Star of the Order of Merit of the Federal Republic of Germany, the Grand Decoration of Honour for Services to the Republic of Austria, the Order of the Cross of Terra Mariana, the Hanns Martin Schleyer Prize and the Social Market Economy Prize of the Konrad Adenauer Foundation.

The Hans Peter Stihl Prize was instituted in 1999 and named in his honour.
