= Trumpf =

German machine tools and laser manufacturer

TRUMPF SE + Co. KG
- Type: Private (SE/KG)
- Industry: Machine industry
- Predecessor: Mechanische Werkstätte Julius Geiger
- Founded: 1923; 103 years ago
- Founder: Christian Trumpf
- Headquarters: Ditzingen, Germany
- Area served: Worldwide
- Key people: Nicola Leibinger-Kammüller, President and Chairwoman of the Managing Board; Peter Leibinger, Chairman of the Supervisory Board
- Revenue: €4,339.3 million (2025/26)
- Net income: €393.5 million (2025/26)
- Total assets: €5,014.7 million (2025/26)
- Total equity: €2,913.8 million (2025/26)
- Owners: Leibinger family (90%); Berthold Leibinger Stiftung (10%)
- Number of employees: 17,583 (2025/26)
- Divisions: Machine tools; Laser technology
- Website: trumpf.com

TRUMPF SE + Co. KG is a German family-owned company based in Ditzingen near Stuttgart, Baden-Württemberg. It originates from Julius Geiger's mechanical workshop. The Trumpf and Leibinger families transformed the medium-sized company into a globally recognized industrial group. Today, the company is one of the world’s largest suppliers of machine tools and a leader in laser technology. In addition to machine tools and laser technology, the group is active in industrial power electronics through its electronics business field. Trumpf is one of the most well-known representatives of the German 'Mittelstand'.

== History ==
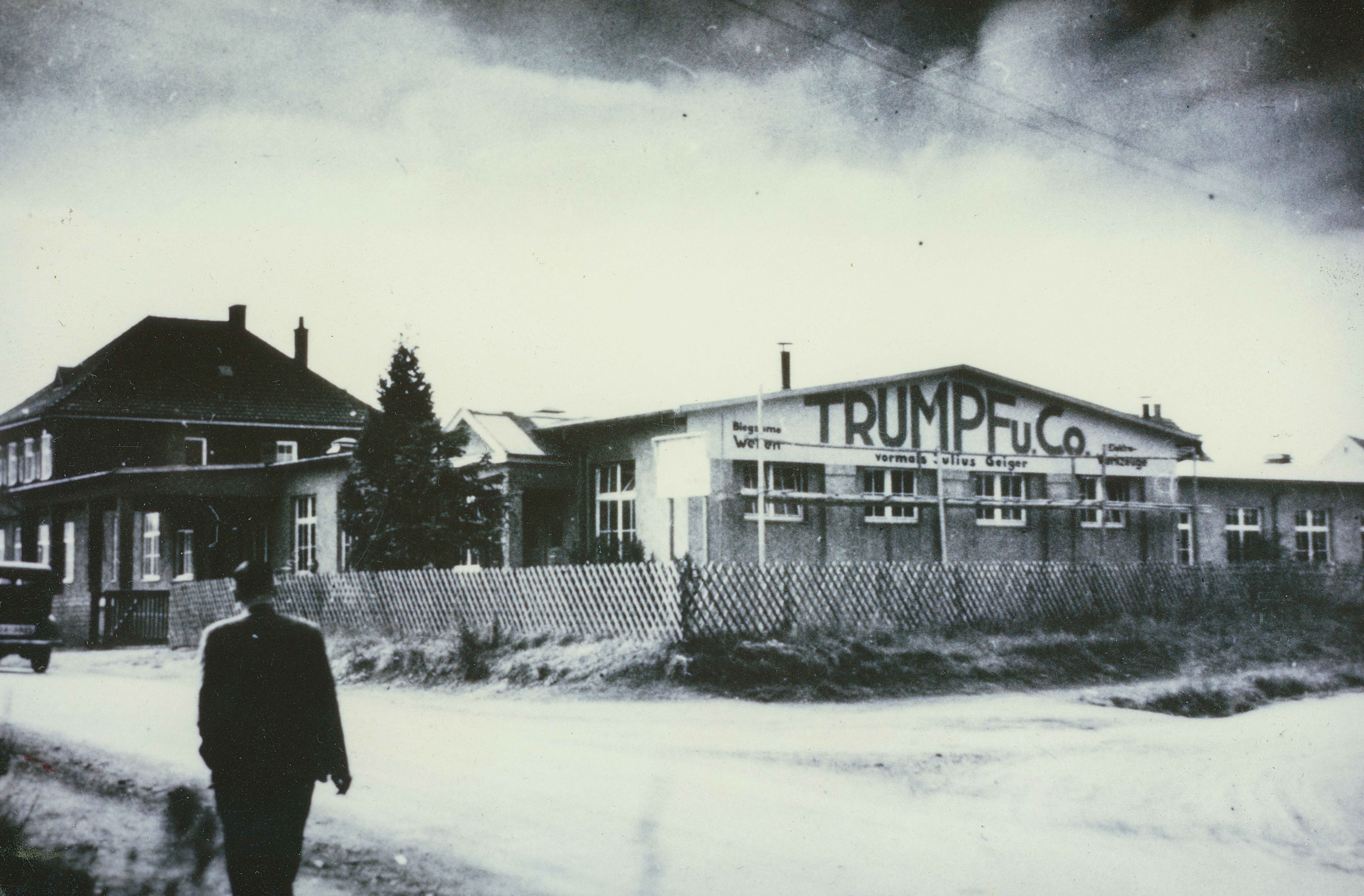
Weilimdorf production site in 1933

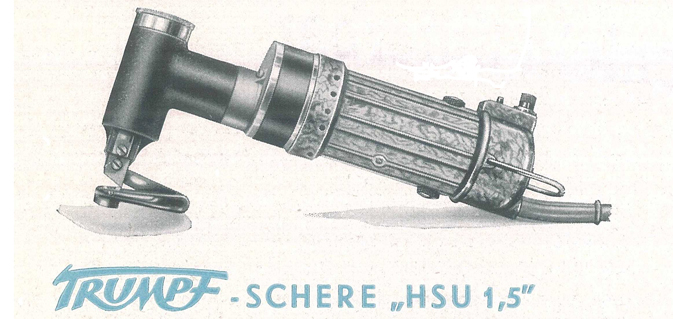
One of the first motor-driven hand shears

=== Growth in early years ===
Christian Trumpf bought Julius Geiger's mechanical workshop in Stuttgart, Germany in 1923. The company initially produced flexible shafts. These were used to drive drills and other tools. Following the development of a motorized drive, the shafts were increasingly used in industry, for example in metal and woodworking. The first motorized hand shears for cutting sheet metal were introduced by Trumpf in 1934.

In the 1920s, the company grew to more than 70 employees. In 1933, the administrative and production headquarters were moved to Weilimdorf, a suburb of Stuttgart. To reflect the change in ownership, the company name was changed to Trumpf & Co. in 1937. The new name was used with the additional text "formerly Julius Geiger" for a few years after the change.

During the 1930s and 1940s, Trumpf manufactured mainly flexible shafts and electric hand shears. The company was a supplier to Elektron Co. of Bad Cannstatt, a manufacturer of compressed air systems. This company produced foot pumps that were also used in military aircraft. Trumpf employed around 100 people during the Second World War, a third of whom were French forced laborers (most of these men came from Vierzon, to the south of Paris).

=== Post-war reconstruction ===
The company's factories remained largely undamaged during the war. As a result, production quickly resumed after the end of the war. By 1950, Trumpf was generating more than one million DM in sales revene. The rapid growth of German economics across all industries boosted demand. During the 60s and 70s, the company was no longer focused mainly on flexible shafts and electric hand shears.

The foreign customer base that Trumpf built up through its presence at international trade fairs also contributed to growth. The first foreign subsidiary was established in Switzerland in 1963. In 1969, the company entered the US market. In 1977, Trumpf entered the Japanese market. Trumpf products were sold in more than 100 countries.

Trumpf continued to expand its production capacity to meet growing demand. In 1972, the company moved its headquarters to Ditzingen near Stuttgart, where new administration and production buildings were built. The company's head office was located there as of 2008.

=== Ownership transition ===
As Christian Trumpf had no children, he appointed Hugo Schwarz as commercial director in 1953. Berthold Leibinger was appointed technical director in 1966. Leibinger gradually bought out the Trumpf’s shares, so that by 1972, Leibinger and Schwarz were the sole shareholders.

When Trumpf died in 1977, Leibinger succeeded him, becoming CEO in 1978. Under Leibinger's leadership, many innovations were developed. The first sheet-metal working machine with numerical path control attracted worldwide attention. This machine was based on a patent for coordinate guidance that Trumpf had registered in 1957 as the result of Leibinger's diploma thesis. In 1985, Trumpf also introduced its first carbon-dioxide laser, which formed the basis for a further business division.

=== Global expansion ===
In the 1980s and 1990s, Trumpf developed from a medium-sized, southwestern German, or Swabian, company into a global corporation. Trumpf also moved into industrial power electronics during this period. Since 1990, the group has included Hüttinger, known today as Trumpf Hüttinger, a Freiburg-based manufacturer founded by Fritz Hüttinger in 1922 that initially made electromedical devices and later high-frequency and medium-frequency generators. Trumpf expanded this business through acquisitions, including the Polish manufacturer Advanced Converters near Warsaw in 2007 and the microwave specialist HBH Microwave in 2020. Today, it is run as the electronics business field. The company's strategy became an exceptional example of success for the German mechanical engineering industry.

Leibinger played a key role in the company's rise to market leadership. In 2005, he moved from the managing board to the supervisory board, where he remained as chairman until 2012. His daughter, Nicola Leibinger-Kammüller, succeeded him as president of the group in November 2005. Since then, revenue has risen from around €1.5 billion in the 2005/06 fiscal year to €5.4 billion in 2022/23. After two years of declining sales, revenue in the 2025/26 fiscal year rose slightly to €4.34 billion, while EBIT increased from €59 million to €480 million. Leibinger-Kammüller broadened the group's base by setting up a bank and expanding software development capabilities. In 2020, the company positioned itself in the field of Industry 4.0 with smart factories. On its 100th anniversary in 2023, the company identified quantum technology as a future business area.

== Criticism ==
Trumpf, a German manufacturer of machine tools, faced criticism for maintaining operations in Russia despite international calls for companies to exit the market following the 2022 Russian invasion of Ukraine. The company reported revenues in Russia during 2021–2022 but did not issue any official statements regarding its activities in the country. In 2023, Trumpf's revenue in Russia significantly decreased compared to 2022, suggesting a reduction in business operations. However, customs data from 2023 revealed that components from Trumpf were supplied to Russia via intermediaries, raising concerns about the company's commitment to scaling back its presence in the region.

In 2023/24, the Russian subsidiary Trumpf OOO has been renamed Vavilova 67 OOO.

== Operations ==
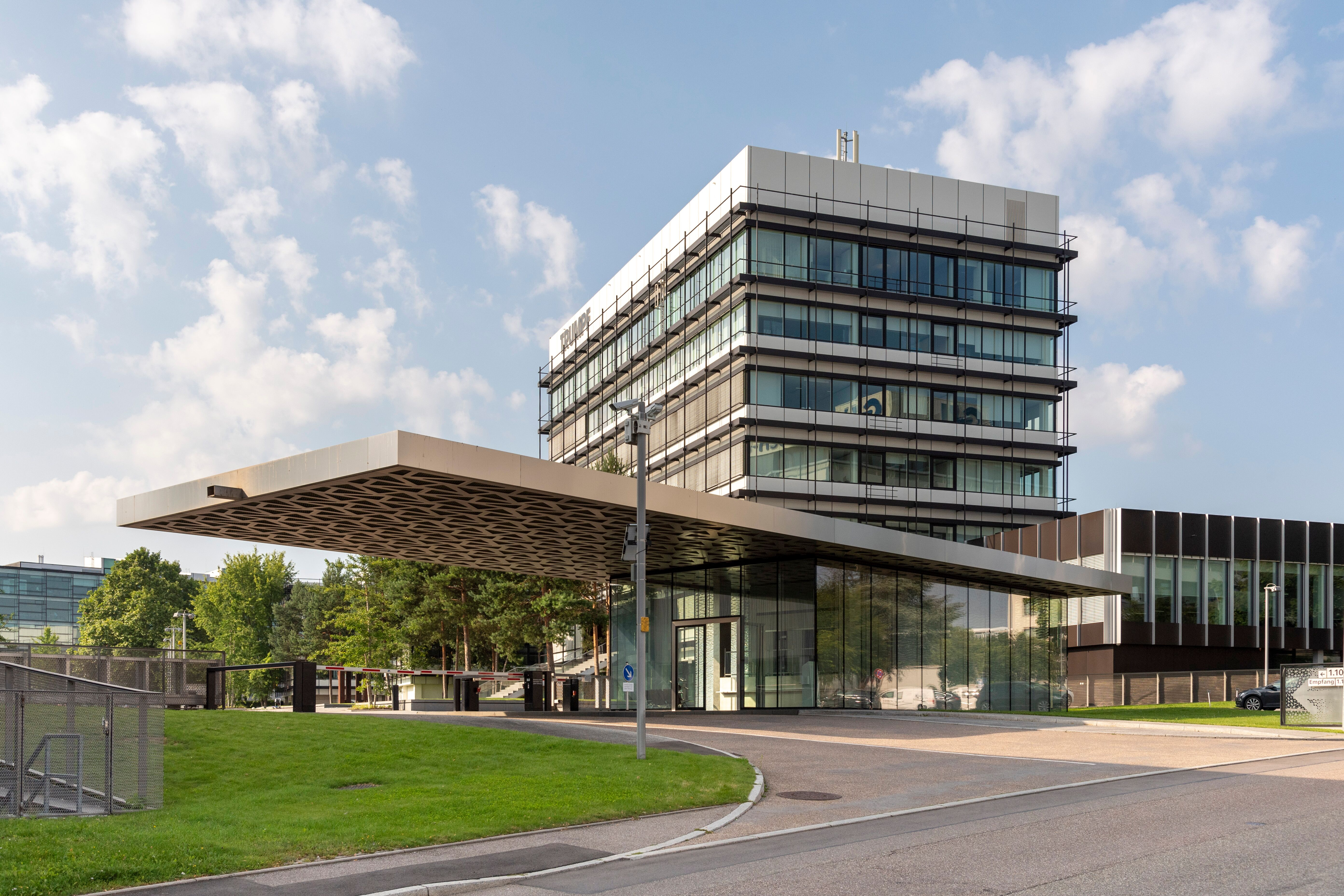
Trumpf headquarters in Ditzingen

=== Ownership ===
The holding company Trumpf SE + Co. KG is the organizational umbrella under which the Trumpf group operates. All investments are consolidated at the group level. As of the 2025/26 fiscal year, the group comprised 94 operating companies.

Trumpf is wholly owned by the Leibinger family (90%) and the Berthold Leibinger Stiftung, foundation (10%). There have been no non-family shareholders since 2003. The Berthold Leibinger Stiftung is a key element of Trumpf's social responsibility efforts. The foundation supports non-profit, charitable, and church organizations, and also undertakes its own sponsorship projects in areas such as culture, science, church, and social welfare. It collaborates with the Doris Leibinger Stiftung, another foundation established by the Leibinger family, to further expand its philanthropic activities.

=== Management ===
The managing board of Trumpf consists of seven persons (as of the 2025/26 fiscal year). The chairwoman is Nicola Leibinger-Kammüller. The other members are Mathias Kammüller (Chief Digital Officer), Lars Grünert (Chief Financial Officer), Berthold Schmidt (Chief Technology Officer) and Oliver Maassen (Chief Human Resources officer) as well as Stephan Mayer (machine tool division) and Hagen Zimer (laser technology division).

The supervisory board of Trumpf consists of an equal number of shareholder and employee representatives. It consists of twelve members (as of the 2025/26 fiscal year), five of whom are women. The chairman is Peter Leibinger. Other known members are Regine Leibinger and Rainer Neske.

== Business activities and divisions ==
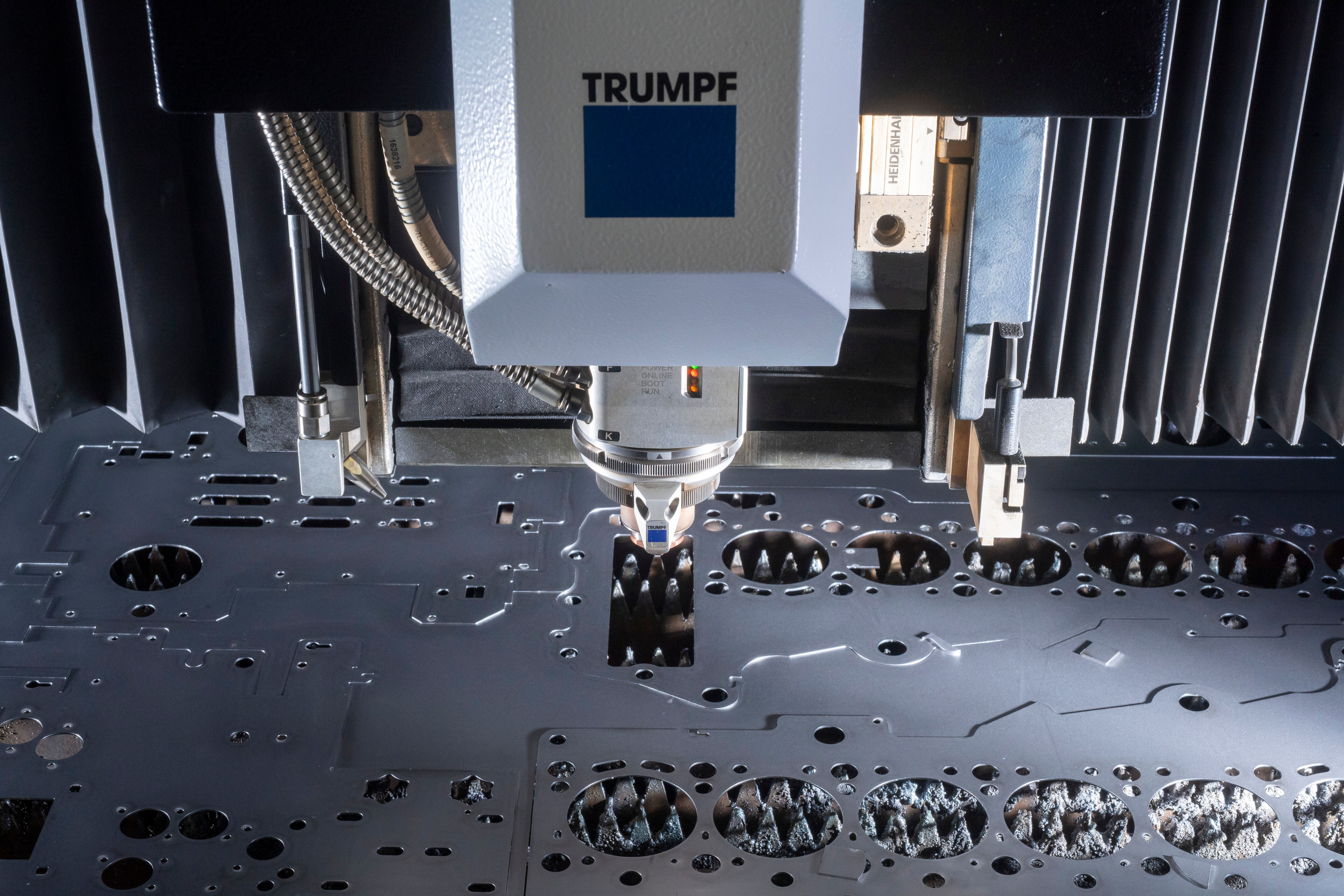
Trumpf laser in use for cutting

The operational business of the Trumpf group is organized into two divisions for machine tools and laser technology. In addition, the group runs the business fields EUV, electronics and financial services. The additive manufacturing (3D printing) business field was sold with effect from 1 September 2025.

=== Machine tools ===
Trumpf has traditionally focused on the flexible processing of sheet metal and tubes. Its portfolio includes machines and systems for cutting, punching, bending and welding. These machines are used in the production of simple sheet metal parts, such as brackets, enclosures or housings, or for components of larger products manufactured, for example in machine and plant construction, commercial vehicles, air-conditioning technology and furniture construction.

=== Laser technology ===
Laser technology is an alternative to sawing and milling. Trumpf manufactures carbon dioxide and solid-state lasers (disc and fiber lasers). These can be used to cut and weld metal and to mark and process surfaces with lasers. The company's continuous wave and pulsed lasers are found in a variety of applications, including industrial production, medical diagnostics, and fundamental scientific research.

High-power laser amplifiers also play a central role in the manufacture of microchips. They are used to generate a plasma that provides the extreme ultraviolet (EUV) radiation for exposing wafers. Employees knowledgeable about Trumpf's laser amplifier technology have been a recruitment target of Huawei.

=== Electronics ===
In its electronics business field, the group is active in industrial power electronics. The business develops and manufactures process power supplies, including direct-current, medium-frequency, high-frequency and microwave generators as well as battery inverters. They are used, among other things, to generate plasmas in the production of semiconductors, solar cells and displays, for inductive heating, and to excite CO_{2} lasers. The portfolio further includes microwave generators for particle accelerators used in research, medicine and industry. The business field is headquartered in Freiburg im Breisgau. In Poland, it operates a laboratory for plasma generators in Zielonka and a plant in Warsaw that produces circuit boards for the semiconductor industry. In the 2024/25 fiscal year, the electronics business field generated revenue of €442 million, after €572 million in the previous year. In 2025/26, its revenue rose by 3.6 percent to €458 million, driven by demand from the semiconductor industry. As of 30 June 2026, the business field employed 2,206 people worldwide, 1,433 of them at its Polish sites.

=== Locations ===
Trumpf operates internationally, with a strong presence in major markets across Europe, America, and the Asia-Pacific region. It has production sites in Germany, France, the United Kingdom, Italy, Austria, Poland, Switzerland and the Czech Republic, in the United States and Mexico, and in China and India. Trumpf opened its plant in India, near Pune, in 2025.

In Germany, Trumpf has traditionally had a strong presence in Baden-Württemberg, where 8 of its 14 domestic locations are situated. As of 30 June 2026, 8,675 people worked for Trumpf in Germany, slightly less than half of the workforce. Most of the group's revenue is generated abroad. In the 2025/26 fiscal year, the United States was Trumpf's largest single market for the first time since 2022/23, with sales of €772 million, ahead of Germany with €655 million and China with €446 million.

=== Key data ===
In € million	2017/18	2018/19	2019/20	2020/21	2021/22	2022/23	2023/24	2024/25	2025/26
Revenue	3,565.6	3,784.0	3,487.7	3,504.7	4,222.8	5,364.5	5,172.5	4,329.0	4,339.3
Profit (EBIT)	534.7	349.3	309.1	369.5	468.4	615.4	501.1	59.0	479.6
Total assets	3,469.8	3,939.2	3,914.7	4,225.0	4,586.1	5,019.1	5,041.1	4,691.3	5,014.7
Equity ratio	54.1%	51.4%	51.5%	47.7%	52.1%	53.8%	58.0%	54.9%	58.1%
Employees	13,420	14,490	14,325	14,767	16,554	18,352	19,018	18,303	17,583

== Awards and honours ==
=== German Future Prize ===
In 2013, Trumpf was awarded the German Future Prize (de: Deutscher Zukunftspreis) for its collaboration with Robert Bosch, researchers from Fraunhofer IOF, and Friedrich Schiller University Jena in developing an ultrashort pulse laser for industrial mass production.

In 2020, Trumpf received the German Future Prize again, this time for its groundbreaking contribution to the production of modern microchips using EUV (extreme ultraviolet) lithography. This achievement was the result of a partnership with ASML, Zeiss, and Fraunhofer IOF.

=== Hermes Award ===
In 2020, Trumpf was awarded the Hermes Award for its development of the "Omlox" standard. This standard allows for the technology- and manufacturer-independent provision of location data. The development of Omlox involved the collaboration of over 60 industrial companies.

=== Miscellaneous ===
In 2022, Forbes included Trumpf on its list of the World's Best Employers. The Trumpf Group is recognised as an example of balancing economic interests with employee satisfaction, implementing measures such as annual working time accounts to support this balance.
