= Waltrude Schleyer =

German activist (1916–2008)

- Born: Waltrude Ketterer; 21 January 1916; Munich, Kingdom of Bavaria, German Empire
- Died: 21 March 2008 (aged 92); Stuttgart, Germany
- Occupation: Physical therapist
- Spouse: Hanns Martin Schleyer (1939–1977, his death)
- Parent: Emil Ketterer

Waltrude Ketterer Schleyer (21 January 1916 – 21 March 2008) was the widow of Hanns Martin Schleyer, a high-ranking German business executive and former member of the SS, who was murdered by the Red Army Faction in 1977.

== Biography ==
She married Schleyer in 1939. She was the daughter of the physician, city councillor of Munich and SA-Obergruppenführer Emil Ketterer. They had four sons. Waltrude Schleyer was a trained physical therapist and joined the Nazi Party in 1937.

During the couple's times in Prague, Waltrude Schleyer lived in a formerly Jewish owned house whose owner died in a German concentration camp within the same time period.

Schleyer's husband, Hanns Martin Schleyer, was the head of the employers association in West Germany and a former SS lieutenant. He was kidnapped and then killed by the Red Army Faction (RAF) in 1977.

Waltrude Schleyer advocated against clemency for RAF members who had killed her husband. One of Martin Schleyer's kidnappers, Christian Klar, was refused a pardon by German President Horst Koehler, but was released on 19 December 2008. Other former RAF terrorist members have also been granted clemency and released. These moves were sharply opposed by Waltrude Schleyer.

Waltrude Schleyer died on March 21, 2008, at the age of 92 in Stuttgart, Germany. Her death was announced in the Stuttgarter Nachrichten daily newspaper, which did not give a cause of her death.
