= Hanns Martin Schleyer =

German business magnate and SS officer (1915–1977)

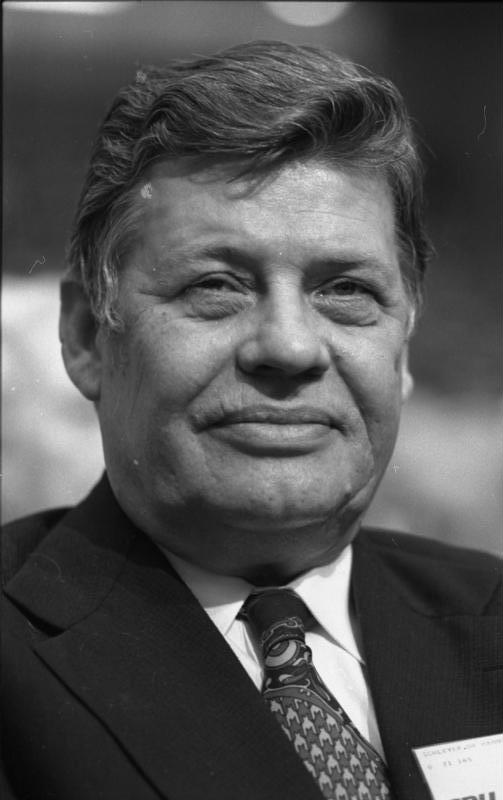
- Schleyer in November 1973

President of the Confederation of German Employers' Associations
- In office 1 January 1977 – 18 October 1977
- Preceded by: Otto A. Friedrich
- Succeeded by: Otto Esser

President of the Federation of German Industries
- In office 6 December 1973 – 18 October 1977
- Preceded by: Hans Günter Sohl
- Succeeded by: Nikolaus Fasolt (1978)

Personal details
- Born: 1 May 1915 Offenburg, Grand Duchy of Baden, German Empire
- Died: 18 October 1977 (aged 62) en route to Mulhouse, France
- Cause of death: Assassination
- Party: Christian Democratic Union (1970–1977); Nazi Party (1937–1945)
- Spouse: Waltrude Schleyer (m. 1939)
- Children: 4
- Relatives: Johann Martin Schleyer (great-great uncle)
- Education: Heidelberg University; University of Innsbruck (Dr. jur.)
- Occupation: Lawyer; Lobbyist; Executive; Paramilitary

Military service
- Allegiance: SS (until 1945)

Hans "Hanns" Martin Schleyer (German pronunciation: [ˈhans ˈmaʁtiːn ˈʃlaɪɐ]; 1 May 1915 – 18 October 1977) was a German business executive, employer and industry representative, SS officer, and lobbyist. He served as president of two powerful commercial organizations: the Confederation of German Employers' Associations (German: Bundesvereinigung der Deutschen Arbeitgeberverbände, BDA) and the Federation of German Industries (Bundesverband der Deutschen Industrie, BDI).

Schleyer became a target for radical elements of the West German student movement in the 1970s due to his roles in these business organisations, his positions in labour disputes, his combative television appearances, his conservative anti-communist views, his prominence as a member of the Christian Democratic Union, and his past as an enthusiastic member of the Nazi student movement and, later, the SS.

He was kidnapped on 5 September 1977 by the far-left terrorist organization Red Army Faction (Rote Armee Fraktion, RAF) and subsequently murdered; his driver and police escort of three policemen were also killed when his car was ambushed. The West German government determined that it was in the national interest not to negotiate with terrorists. The abduction and murder are commonly seen as the climax of the RAF campaign in 1977, known as the German Autumn. After his death Schleyer has been extensively honoured in Germany; the Hanns Martin Schleyer Prize, the Hanns Martin Schleyer Foundation and the Hanns-Martin-Schleyer-Halle are named in his honour. In 2017 German President Frank-Walter Steinmeier and the German government marked the 40th anniversary of the kidnapping.

== Early life ==
Born on 1 May 1915 in Offenburg, Grand Duchy of Baden, Hanns Martin Schleyer was the eldest child of Ernst Julius Schleyer (1882–1959) and Helene Luise Elisabeth Schleyer (née Rheitinger; 1883–1979). His legal name, as shown by his birth certificate, was Hans Martin Schleyer, but Schleyer himself always spelled his first name with two 'n's since childhood. His father was a judge and his great-great uncle was Johann Martin Schleyer, a renowned Roman Catholic priest who invented the Volapük language. Schleyer was raised Catholic by his paternal family, which went against the wishes of his irreligious father, who was described as "hot-tempered" and holding national conservative views.

Schleyer finished his Abitur in Rastatt and began studying law at the University of Heidelberg in 1933, where he first joined the student fraternity Teutonia 1842 zu Rastatt before switching to Corps Suevia a year later. In 1939 he obtained a doctorate at the University of Innsbruck.

== Involvement in the Nazi Party ==
Early in his life, he became a follower of Nazism. On 1 March 1931, Schleyer became a member of the Hitler Youth, the youth organization of the Nazis. On 1 July 1933, he joined the SS (SS number 221.714), eventually reaching the rank of Untersturmführer (Second Lieutenant) in 1945. During his studies, he was engaged in the Nazi student movement. One of his mentors at this time was the student leader Gustav Adolf Scheel.

In the summer of 1935, Schleyer accused his fraternity of lacking "national socialist spirit". He left the fraternity when the Kösener SC, an umbrella organization, refused to exclude Jewish members. Schleyer became a leader in the national socialist student movement and, in 1937, joined the NSDAP. At first, he was the president of the student body of the University of Heidelberg. Later, Reichsstudentenführer Scheel sent him to post-Anschluss Austria where he occupied the same position at the University of Innsbruck. On 21 October 1939, Schleyer married Waltrude Ketterer (1916–2008), daughter of the physician, city councillor of Munich and SA-Obergruppenführer Emil Ketterer. They had four sons.

During World War II, Schleyer was drafted and served on the Western Front from 1939 to 1940 where he participated in the Invasion of France. He was relieved of combat duties in autumn 1940 when he dislocated both of his arms during a climbing exercise for the planned invasion of Britain. He was discharged of military duty on 1 May 1941 at Scheel's request to return to his position at the University of Innsbruck. He was subsequently sent to Prague, where he was appointed president of the student body at the German campus of Charles University.

In this position, he met Bernhard Adolf, one of the German economic leaders in the Protectorate of Bohemia and Moravia, who brought Schleyer into the industrial association of Bohemia and Moravia in 1943. The association was responsible for Aryanization and the procurement of slave laborers. Schleyer became an important deputy and adviser to Bernhard Adolf, and as an administrative chief for the industrial association was required to channel Czech economic resources into sustaining the Nazi war effort.

Schleyer and his wife were given accommodation in houses seized from Jewish residents during their time in Prague. In 1944, they moved to a seized villa estate in Bubeneč, after the previous inhabitant, SA-Obersturmführer Friedrich Hermann Klausing, had committed suicide in wake of the revelation that his son had been an orchestrator in the 20 July assassination plot against Hitler. On 5 May 1945, Schleyer and his family escaped from the city shortly after the start of the Prague uprising.

== Industrial leader in West Germany ==
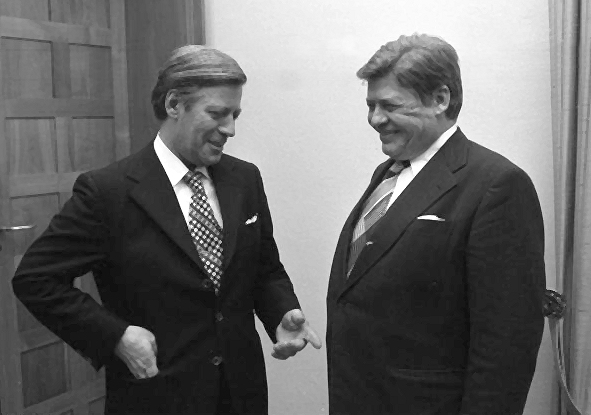
Hanns Martin Schleyer (right) and Chancellor Helmut Schmidt, 1974

After World War II, Schleyer was arrested by French forces while hiding at his parents' home in Konstanz and was held as a prisoner of war for three years by the Allies because of his membership in the SS. In his denazification proceeding, Schleyer was initially charged as a Minderbelasteter, but he put in an appeal by falsely understating his rank as Oberscharführer so as to reduce his prospective punishment for which he was instead labelled a Mitläufer. He was repatriated in 1948 after paying a fine of 300 Mark.

After working under the French occupation with Direction des Bases Aériennes in Lahr, he became secretary of the chamber of commerce of Baden-Baden shortly after the founding of West Germany. In 1951 Schleyer joined Daimler-Benz, and, with help from a mentor, Fritz Koenecke, eventually became a member of the board of directors, where he was responsible for personnel and labor issues. At the end of the 1960s, he was almost appointed chairman of the board, but lost the position to Joachim Zahn. Successively, Schleyer became more involved in employers' associations, and was a leader in employer and industry associations. He was simultaneously president of the Confederation of German Employers' Associations (BDA) and the Federation of German Industries (BDI).

His uncompromising acts during industrial protests in the 1960s such as industrial lockouts, his history with the Nazi Party, and his aggressive appearance, especially on TV (The New York Times described him as a "caricature of an ugly capitalist"), made Schleyer the ideal enemy for the 1968 student movement. By mid-1977, authorities identified Schleyer as a high risk target in wake of the RAF murders of federal attorney Siegfried Buback (a fellow former Nazi Party member), and bank director representative Jürgen Ponto earlier that year.

In 1977 Schleyer debated with Heinz Oskar Vetter, chairman of the Confederation of German Trade Unions in a crosstalk at the 8. St. Gallen Symposium, which later gained a high profile, after Schleyer's kidnapping.

== Kidnapping and murder ==
Hanns Martin Schleyer on 13 October 1977, after being kidnapped by the RAF

On 5 September 1977, an RAF unit, Kommando Siegfried Hausner, named after an RAF figure killed during the Stockholm embassy attack two years earlier, attacked the chauffeured car carrying Schleyer in Cologne, just after the car had turned right from Friedrich Schmidt Strasse into Vincenz-Statz Strasse. His driver was forced to brake when a pram suddenly appeared in the street in front of them. The police escort vehicle behind them was unable to stop in time, and crashed into Schleyer's car. Four (or possibly five) masked RAF members then jumped out and sprayed bullets into the two vehicles, killing four members of the convoy. Schleyer was then pulled out of the car and forced into the RAF assailants' own getaway van.

The RAF demanded that the West German government release captured members of their organization. After this demand was declined the RAF members were all eventually found dead in their jail cells. After Schleyer's kidnappers received the news of the deaths of their imprisoned comrades, Schleyer was taken from Brussels on 18 October 1977, and shot dead en route to Mulhouse, France, where his body was left in the boot of a green Audi 100 on the rue Charles Péguy.

== See also ==
- German Autumn
- List of kidnappings
- List of solved missing person cases: 1950–1999
