= Federation of German Industries =

German industry lobbying group

Federation of German Industries (BDI)
- Formation: July 1, 1949; 77 years ago
- Headquarters: Berlin
- Members: 184
- Leader: Peter Leibinger, (President); Tanja Gönner, (CEO)
- Website: https://bdi.eu/

The Federation of German Industries (German: Bundesverband der Deutschen Industrie, BDI) is the umbrella organization of German industry and industry-related service providers in the legal form of a registered association. It represents 184 industry associations and more than 100,000 companies that employ around 8 million workers. Membership is voluntary. A total of 15 Bundesland-level agencies represent the interests of the economy at regional level. The headquarters of the BDI is the Haus der Deutschen Wirtschaft in Berlin. The BDI also has offices abroad and is represented internationally ArtHaus in Berg Leo. Peter Leibinger has been its president since 1 January 2025.

== History ==
The Federation of German Industries (BDI) has its roots in the Reich Federation of German Industry (RDI). On 19 June 1933, during the Nazi era, the Reich Federation of German Industry merged with the Federation of German Employers' Associations to form the Reich Industry Group. This body was responsible for the representation of industrial enterprises during the Nazi period and was subsequently dissolved at the end of the Second World War in 1945.

When the Federal Republic of Germany was established in 1949, the German Trade Union Confederation (DGB) was founded in Munich. The DGB was formed to exclusively represent the interests of employees. On 1 July 1949, the statutes of this representative body were approved by the representatives of the military government. On 19 October 1949, representatives of 32 trade associations and working groups established the Committee for Economic Issues of the Industrial Associations to counter the Allies' reservations regarding a regularly operating industrial umbrella organisation. At the beginning of 1950, this organisation was renamed the Federation of German Industry.

Between 1950 and 1999 the headquarters of the BDI were located in the House of German Industry in Cologne.

== Topics of the BDI ==
The BDI deals with various topics, which are handled by the following 18 committees: Foreign Trade Committee; Digital Economy, Telecommunications and Media Committee; Energy and Climate Policy Committee; Money, Credit and Currency Committee; Healthcare Industry Committee; Public Procurement Committee; Legal Committee; Industrial Property Committee; Raw Materials Policy Committee; Security Committee; Tax Committee, Environment, Technology and Sustainability Committee; Consumer Policy Committee; Transport Committee; Competition Regulation Committee; and Education and SME Committee. The BDI works with the Confederation of German Employers' Associations (BDA) in this regard.

== Organizational structure ==
The BDI is headed by the Presidential Board. This consists of a president, his elected successor, his immediate predecessor, seven other deputies and the treasurer (vice president), and 15 further members to be elected by the executive board.

=== President and Board of Directors ===
The president and the vice-presidents, together with the chairmen of the member associations, form the board of directors. The board of directors is responsible for the affairs of the BDI insofar as these are not reserved for other bodies by law or the Articles of Association. The current president of the BDI is Peter Leibinger.

Presidents of the BDI, since its foundation in 1949, have been:

- 1949-1971: Fritz Berg
- 1972-1976: Hans Günter Sohl
- 1977 (Jan.-Oct.): Hanns Martin Schleyer
- 1978 (Jan.-Sept.): Nikolaus Fasolt
- 1978-1984: Rolf Rodenstock
- 1985-1986: Hans Joachim Langmann
- 1987-1990: Tyll Necker
- 1991-1992: Heinrich Weiss
- 1992-1994: Tyll Necker
- 1995-2000: Hans-Olaf Henkel
- 2001-2004: Michael Rogowski
- 2005-2008: Jürgen Thumann
- 2009-2012: Hans-Peter Keitel
- 2013-2016: Ulrich Grillo
- 2017-2020: Dieter Kempf
- 2021-2024: Siegfried Russwurm
- from 2025: Peter Leibinger

=== Chief executive ===
Since its foundation in 1949, the BDI's chief executive has been:

- 1949-1957: Hans-Wilhelm Beutler
- 1957-1968: Gustav Stein
- 1969-1977: Fritz Neef
- 1977-1989: Siegfried Mann
- 1990-2006: Ludolf von Wartenberg
- 2007-2011: Werner Schnappauf
- 2011-2017: Markus Kerber
- 2017-2022: Joachim Lang
- since 2022: Tanja Gönner

The executive board consists of a chief executive officer, a deputy chief executive officer and two other members. Tanja Gönner has been the chief executive officer of the BDI since 15 November 2022. The other members of the executive board are currently the deputy managing director Holger Lösch, Iris Plöger and Wolfgang Niedermark.

== Responsibilities ==
As an umbrella organization, the federation is responsible for the representation and promotion of concerns of the industrial sectors it encompasses. However, it is not permitted to represent issues relating to social policy. This function is reserved for the Confederation of German Employers' Associations (BDA). According to section 4, paragraph 2 of the BDI statutes, membership of the BDI is limited to leading industrial associations and working groups, and is not open to sole proprietors or corporate networks. In terms of political science, the BDI is recognised as an interest group in the "Economy and Labor" sector, and is referred to as "an investor association of industrial sector and trade associations". As an advocacy group, its main role is to articulate the interests of its members and their industries, while it also engages in global lobbying on behalf of industrially active enterprises at the local, national and global levels, and thereby is heard across all economic relevant legislative processes.

== Member associations ==
The association represents the following 39 member associations:

- Association of the Automotive Industry (VDA)
- Federal Association of Building Materials - Stones and Soil e.V. bbs
- Association of Consulting Engineers e.V. (VBI)
- Biotechnology Industry Organization Germany e.V. (BIO Germany eV)
- Association of the Chemical Industry e.V. (VCI)
- Central Association Electrical Engineering- and Electronics Industry e.V. (ZVEI)
- Federal Association of the German Disposal, Water and Raw Materials Management e.V. (BDE)
- Federal Association of Natural Gas, Petroleum and Geonergy e. V. (BVEG)
- Verband Forschender Arzneimittelhersteller e. V. (vfa) (Association of Research-Based Pharmaceutical Companies)
- Central Real Estate Committee e. V. (ZIA)
- Association of the Potash and Salt Industry e. V. (VKS)
- Federal Association of German Foundry Industry e.V. (BDG)
- Federal Association Glass Industry e.V.
- Federal Association for Information Technology, Telecommunications and New Media e.V. (BITKOM)
- Federation of Ceramic Industry e.V. (BVKI)
- Federal Association of the German Aerospace Industry e.V. (BDLI)
- Federal Association of the German Aviation Economy e.V. (BDL)
- Mechanical Engineering Industry Association (VDMA)
- Trade Association Metals e.V. (WVM)
- Mineral Oil Economy Association e.V. (MWV)
- Employers and Business Association of Mobility and Transport Services e.V. (Agv MoVe)
- Association of German Paper Mills e.V. (VDP)
- Federal Association of the Pharmaceutical Industry e.V. (BPI)
- Association of Raw Materials and Mining e.V. (VRB)
- Federal Association of the German Security and Defense Industry e.V. (BDSV)
- Trade Association Steel
- Trade Association Steel Construction and Energy Technology e.V. (WV SET)
- Trade Association Steel and Metal Processing e.V. (WSM)
- Association of the German Textile- and Fashion Industry e.V.
- Federal Association of German Tourism e.V. (BTW)
- Association of TÜV e.V.
- Association of the German Interconnected Grid Systems Economy e.V. (VdV)
- German Cigarette Association e.V. (DZV)
- Verein der Zuckerindustrie e.V. (VdZ)
- Industry Group: Federal Association of Jewelry-, Watch-, Silverware- and related Industries e.V.
- Industry Group: Association of the German Vending Machine Industry e.V. (VDAI)
- Industry Group: Association of the German Dental Industry e.V. (VDDI)
- Industry Group: Association of the German Gaming Industry e. V.

== Cooperations ==
- Confederation of German Employers' Associations
- European Movement Germany
- Hans-Erich-Nossack-Preis
