= Confederation of German Employers' Associations =

Organization of German employers' associations

Confederation of German Employers' Associations (BDA)
- Formation: 1949 in Wiesbaden
- Headquarters: Berlin
- Leader: Rainer Dulger, President Steffen Kampeter, CEO
- Website: https://arbeitgeber.de/

Logo

The Confederation of German Employers' Associations (German: Bundesvereinigung der Deutschen Arbeitgeberverbände; BDA) is the umbrella organization for German employers' associations. It represents interest groups in the areas of industry, the tertiary sector, banking, commerce, transport, trade and agriculture.

In 1977, Ex SS officer and head of BDA, Hanns Martin Schleyer, was murdered by the Red Army Faction, a far-left German militant group.

The seat of the BDA is in Berlin (until 1999: Cologne).

== History ==
The employers' organisation were formed in response to the trade unions. The German Book Printers' Association was founded as early as 1869 as the first and oldest employers' association. In April 1904, the main office of the German employers' associations was founded with its headquarters in Berlin and in 1913 the "Federation of German Employers' Associations" was established. This was the result of a merger of two rival umbrella organisations, the Hauptstelle deutscher Arbeitgeberverbände (founded in 1904 to represent heavy industry employers) and the Verein deutscher Arbeitgeberverbände (founded in 1904 to represent employers in the manufacturing industry).

By 1920, companies with 8 million employees were already organised in employers' associations. After the NSDAP seized power, the employers' organisations disbanded under pressure from the National Socialists. After the Second World War, employers' organisations remained banned in the Soviet occupation zone and the GDR. In the western sectors, they continued the traditions of the time before 1933. In 1947, the Employers' Association of the Western Zone was formed, which became the Central Secretariat of the Employers of the United Economic Area in 1948. Even before the Basic Law came into force, the constitutive meeting of the social policy working group of the employers' associations of the united economic area, based in Wiesbaden, was held in January 1949 by representatives of 23 specialised and eight interdisciplinary employers' associations. After the associations in the former French occupation zone had also joined at the end of 1949, the name "Confederation of German Employers' Associations" was adopted in November 1950.

The BDA has persistently opposed codetermination, wherein workers also serve in managerial functions along with the ownership.

With the establishment of association structures based on the West German model in the new federal states in 1990, the BDA established itself as an all-German employers' association. In 1999, the BDA followed the government's move to Berlin and relocated to the Spree. There it shares the Haus der Deutschen Wirtschaft at Breite Straße 29 with the Federation of German Industries and the Association of German Chambers of Industry and Commerce.

== Organisation ==
German employers' organisations are brought together under the umbrella of the Confederation of German Employers' Associations. Its members are 14 interdisciplinary state associations (joint state associations between Berlin and Brandenburg as well as Hamburg and Schleswig-Holstein) with respective interdisciplinary regional associations, as well as 49 federal umbrella organisations with respective state and regional trade associations from the fields of industry, services, finance, trade, transport, crafts and agriculture. In total, around one million companies are indirect members of the BDA. These employ around 70 per cent of all employees. However, the largest employer in Germany, the public sector, is not a member of the employers' organisations.

The BDA is a registered association in accordance with Section 21 of the German Civil Code (BGB). As a professional association with the purpose of representing the interests of employers in our pluralistic society, it is committed to the common good and is therefore tax-exempt.

The most important bodies are the General Assembly of Members, the Board of Directors, the Executive Committee, the Executive Board, the committees and the Walter Raymond Foundation.

The General Assembly, which takes place annually, elects the President for a two-year term, the Executive Committee and members of the Board of Directors and is responsible for the budget and the membership fee regulations.

The Executive Board admits new members, sets up committees and makes unanimous collective bargaining policy recommendations. It determines the fundamental policy decisions.

The Executive Committee acts within the framework set by the Executive Board and is the central decision-making body. It consists of the President, eight Vice Presidents including the Treasurer and 38 other members[2] and represents the entire spectrum of the German economy. The President and Vice-Presidents form the legal board of the BDA in accordance with Section 26 of the German Civil Code (BGB).

The Chief Executive is appointed by the Executive Board on the recommendation of the President. The Chief Executive Officer and two members of the Executive Board manage the day-to-day business in close consultation with the President. In addition, there are 75 committees and working groups that deal with specialised issues, including four joint committees with the Federation of German Industries. Their proposals and opinions form the basis for the decisions of the Executive Board and the Executive Committee. At European level, there is Businesseurope (formerly the Union des Confédérations de l'Industrie et des Employeurs d'Europe). Internationally, the BDA is represented in the International Organisation of Employers.
