= Siegfried Hausner =

German terrorist (1952–1975)

- Born: 24 January 1952; Selb, West Germany
- Died: 5 May 1975 (aged 23); Stuttgart, West Germany
- Organization(s): Socialist Patients' Collective, Red Army Faction

Siegfried Hausner (24 January 1952 – 5 May 1975) was a German far-left terrorist. He was a student member of the German Socialist Patients' Collective who was sentenced to three years imprisonment in 1972 for terrorist related crimes. When he was released in 1974, like many other former members of the SPK, he joined the Red Army Faction.

== Stockholm Embassy siege ==
In 1975 Hausner was handpicked by Siegfried Haag to lead the group, known as Kommando Holger Meins who conducted the West German Embassy siege in Stockholm to force the release of 26 of his RAF comrades. Hausner was in charge of the wiring of the explosives. Twelve hours into the occupation, the explosives (15 kilogrammes of TNT) were apparently accidentally detonated.

In the documentary film Stockholm 75, fellow Kommando Holger Meins member Karl-Heinz Dellwo discussed the explosion and explained that only he and Siegfried Hausner were in a position near the detonator to trigger it and that he did not know why it exploded, only that he didn't activate it.

While fellow Kommando Holger Meins member Ulrich Wessel was killed instantly (the explosion causing him to drop a hand grenade), Hausner was severely wounded in the explosion, with burns to over 40% of his body and a fractured skull. Despite the recommendations of Swedish doctors, Hausner was immediately flown back to West Germany and hospitalized in Stammheim Prison, which had neither the equipment or specialist staff to treat severe burns. According to deputy chief prison officer Horst Bubeck, Hausner had "no chance of surviving, as the doctors saw immediately". He died on 5 May from a pulmonary edema.

His hurried relocation to Germany, the quality of treatment he received at Stammheim, and his subsequent death led many to blame both the West German government for killing him and the Swedish government for agreeing to his deportation despite being severely injured.

== Legacy ==
After his death, Siegfried Hausner became a martyr to the cause (along with other late terrorists, such as Holger Meins and Petra Schelm).

When Siegfried Buback was assassinated in April 1977, the RAF claimed responsibility in honor of Ulrike Meinhof and Siegfried Hausner. In the final video recording of kidnapped Hanns Martin Schleyer made before his murder by the RAF in October 1977, Schleyer is seen holding a placard that read, "Commando Siegfried Hausner." The terrorist group involved in Operation Leo planned to rename their unit "Commando Siegfried Hausner" in honour of the deceased extremist before their plot failed.

Some believe that the assassination of Sweden's prime minister Olof Palme on 28 February 1986 was in retaliation for his allowing Hausner to be deported.

== Sources ==
Books:

- Hitler's Children by Jillian Becker
- The Baader Meinhof Complex by Stefan Aust
