= West German Embassy siege in Stockholm =

Hostage standoff initiated by the German Red Army Faction (RAF)

West German Embassy siege
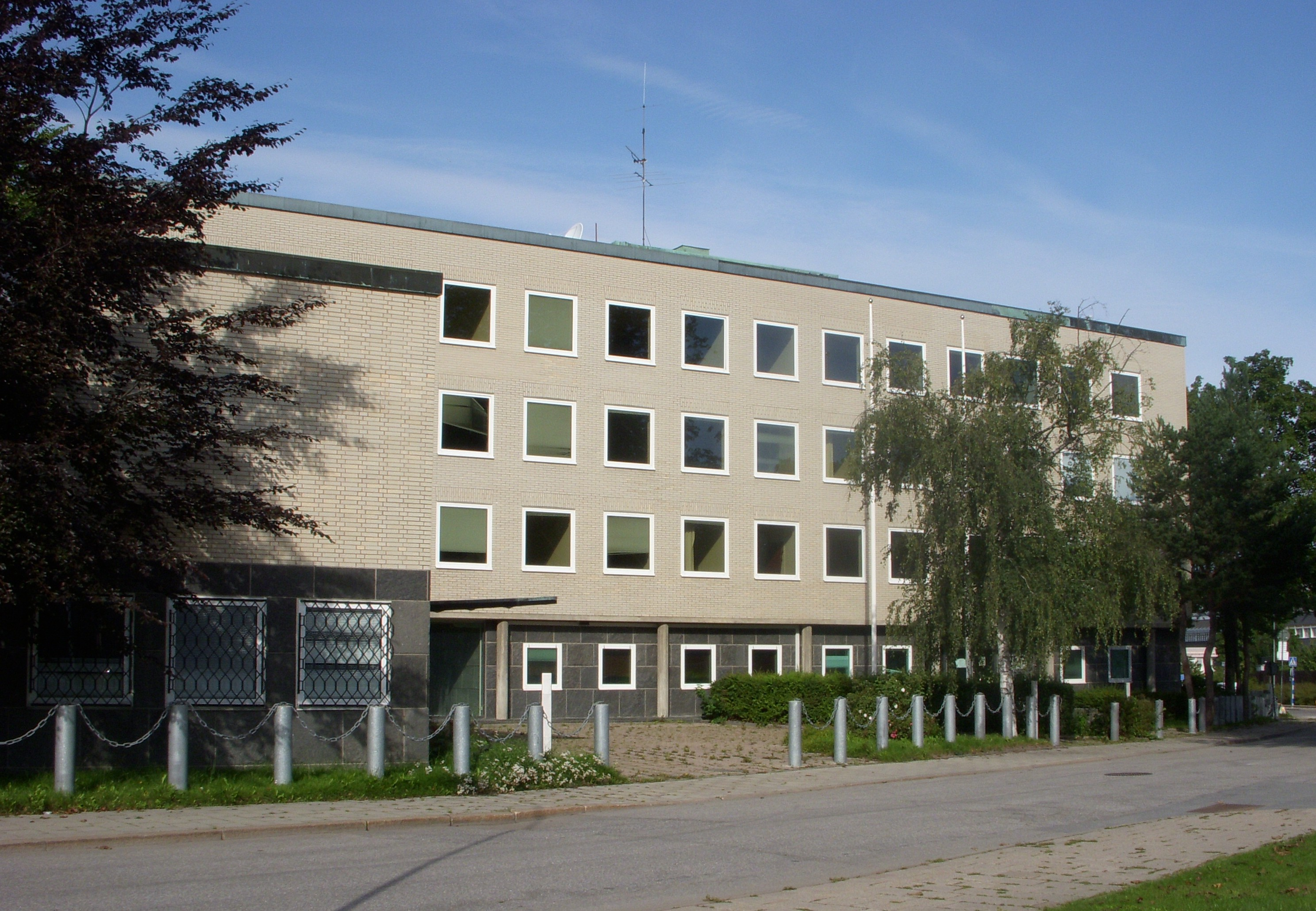
- German embassy in Stockholm (photo from 2008)
- Location: 59°20′4.36″N 18°6′22.96″E; Stockholm, Sweden
- Date: 24 April 1975; 12.00 – 23.47 (CET)
- Target: West German embassy
- Attack type: Siege, hostage crisis
- Weapons: TNT, submachine guns
- Deaths: 2 embassy personnel, 2 perpetrators
- Injuries: 10 embassy personnel, 4 perpetrators
- Perpetrator: Kommando Holger Meins/Red Army Faction

The West German Embassy siege in Stockholm, Sweden, was a hostage standoff initiated by the Red Army Faction (RAF) on 24 April 1975. Collectively, the attackers referred to themselves as Kommando Holger Meins, after Holger Meins, an RAF member who had died of starvation during a (collective) hunger strike in Wittlich Prison on 9 November 1974.

The RAF group carried out the attack with the goal of forcing the release of RAF members and others from prison in West Germany. During the siege they stated: "The Holger Meins Commando is holding members of the embassy staff in order to free prisoners in West Germany. If the police move in, we shall blow the building up with 15 kilos of TNT."

== The siege ==
The group consisted of six members: Karl-Heinz Dellwo, Siegfried Hausner, Hanna-Elise Krabbe, Bernhard Rössner, Lutz Taufer and Ulrich Wessel. They entered the embassy, took thirteen embassy officials hostage (or twelve officials, according to some sources), including ambassador Heinz Dietrich Stoecker, and then proceeded to occupy the upper floors of the building.

They warned Swedish police to back off or some hostages would be killed, but the police did not comply. Consequently, one of the hostages, Baron Andreas von Mirbach, a German military attaché, was marched out onto the landing and shot dead. Coincidentally, in 1918, his late relative Wilhelm von Mirbach had been assassinated at the German embassy in Moscow by Left Socialist-Revolutionaries while serving as German Ambassador to Russia.

Chancellor Helmut Schmidt, having experienced another hostage crisis just weeks before, was not prepared to negotiate with them. In response, economic attaché Hillegaart was made to stand at a window, and was then shot three times. With the murder of Hillegaart, the attackers announced they would execute one hostage every hour until their demands were met.

Swedish police prepared to storm the building, but before they had the chance to do so, the embassy was rocked by a series of violent explosions; the TNT had somehow been detonated. It turned out that one of the terrorists, Ulrich Wessel, had dropped a grenade, which killed him and detonated the TNT cache. The remaining hostages, as well as the other RAF members, all suffered severe burns. The extradition of the captured and surviving RAF militants was ordered by the Swedish then-Minister of Employment, Anna-Greta Leijon. Siegfried Hausner was flown back to West Germany, where he soon died of his wounds in Stammheim Prison.

The explosion of the embassy was caught on tape. Swedish news reporter Bo Holmström was standing outside the embassy ready to broadcast when the explosions took place. After taking cover Holmström started yelling "Lägg ut, lägg ut!" ("Put it on, put it on!"), i.e. "Put me on the air!". Once he thought he was live he began reporting on the events.

== Aftermath ==
Following the siege, Anna-Greta Leijon received multiple threats, including from a so-called "Kommando Sigfried Hausner". Soon after the embassy plot, the Swedish Security Service (Säpo) became involved in the protection of Leijon. In May 1977, an RAF team led by Norbert Kröcher attempted to kidnap Leijon, but her security detail managed to prevent this. Following the failed kidnapping attempt, over 20 people were arrested in Gothenburg and Lund in Sweden, and Gladsaxe in Denmark. Following the assassination of Olof Palme, it was also speculated that the RAF were the perpetrators. However, in June 2020, it was announced by the Swedish government that Stig Engström, who died in 2000, was the likely murderer.

== See also ==
- Operation Leo
- Socialist Patients' Collective
