= Hartmut Piniek =

German painter (born 1950)

Hartmut Piniek (born in 1950 in Wolgast) is a German painter.

== Life ==
After learning the trade of a painter, Piniek worked as a shipyard welder, theatre set painter and as a graphic artist in the medical and scientific area. From 1979 to 1984, he studied painting and graphic arts with Volker Stelzmann, Dietrich Burger and Arno Rink at the Academy of Visual Arts Leipzig (Hochschule für Grafik und Buchkunst). Afterwards Piniek was a master-class student with Bernhard Heisig from 1984 to 1987 and subsequently became an assistant and lecturer of painting at the Hochschule für Grafik und Buchkunst Leipzig from 1987 to 1998.

== Work ==
In his work Piniek focuses on spacious atmospherical landscapes from an aerial perspective filled with artefacts of civilization, small, hazy objects and single, minimised figures.

== Collections ==
- Kupferstichkabinett, Dresden
- Museum der bildenden Künste Leipzig
- Lindenau-Museum Altenburg
- Deutsche Bank, Frankfurt am Main
- Sparkasse Leipzig|Kunsthalle der Sparkasse Leipzig
- Sorbisches Museum Bautzen
- Neue Sächsische Galerie in Chemnitz
- Kunsthalle Bremen
- Deutsches Buch- und Schriftmuseum der Deutschen Bücherei Leipzig
- Stadtgeschichtliches Museum Leipzig
- Schloss Meiningen
- Burg Beeskow|Kunstarchiv Beeskow
