= Frankfurt department store firebombings =

Politically motivated arsons in Frankfurt, Germany

The Frankfurt department store firebombings on 2 April 1968 in Frankfurt am Main were politically motivated arsons perpetrated by the later co-founders of the left wing extremist Red Army Faction, Andreas Baader and Gudrun Ensslin. Together with Thorwald Proll and Horst Söhnlein, they set three fires in two department stores at night and were sentenced to three years in prison each. No people were injured; the damage in the Kaufhaus M. Schneider was calculated at 282.339 DM (equivalent to €561,952 in 2021) and in the Kaufhof, 390.865 DM (equivalent to €777,956 in 2021).

== Background ==
After Benno Ohnesorg was shot by Inspector Karl-Heinz Kurras on 2 June 1967, in West-Berlin, part of the student movement became radicalized. Damage to property, or Gewalt gegen Sachen (“violence against property”) was discussed as a legitimate means of political protest.

On 22. May 1967, the À l’innovation department store burned in Brussels, resulting in the deaths of between 251 and 323 people. This event inspired the Berlin Kommune 1 to produce leaflets in which the human suffering was deplored, but also compared to the suffering of the people bombed with napalm during the Vietnam War.

Leaflet No. 7 “Why are you targeting consumers?”

[…] A burning department store with burning people conveyed, for the first time in a major European city, that crackling Vietnam feeling (of being there and burning along) that we have yet to miss in Berlin. […] As much as we sympathize with the pain of the bereaved in Brussels: we, who are open to the new, can, as long as the right measure is not exceeded, accept the bold and the unconventional, which, despite all the human tragedy, is in the Brussels department store fire, our admiration does not fail. […]

Kommune I (May 24, 1967)”

A second leaflet with the same date was even more direct. The creators of the leaflets, previously known humorously for egg throwing and pudding attacks, suggested that the population could also go to the department store and discreetly light a cigarette in the dressing room.

Leaflet No. 8 “When will the Berlin department stores burn?
[…] If there is a fire somewhere in the near future, if a barracks blows up somewhere, if the stands collapse in a stadium somewhere, please don’t be surprised. Just like when the Americans crossed the demarcation line, the bombing of the city center of Hanoi, and the Marines' invasion of China. Brussels gave us the only answer: Burn, warehouse, burn! (Note: The German words Warenhaus or Kaufhaus both relate to a department store. Perhaps the translation error was consciously accepted in the interests of harmony with “burn, baby, burn,” the rallying cry of the Watts riots in August 1965)
Kommune I (May 24, 1967)“

Because of these leaflets, the Communards Rainer Langhans and Fritz Teufel were charged in the so-called “arson trial” but were acquitted.

== The fires ==
Andreas Baader and Gudrun Ensslin met each other at the end of July 1967 through the extra-parliamentary opposition network in Berlin. On 7 August 1967 they jointly carried out a symbolic smoke bomb attack on the Kaiser Wilhelm Memorial Church.

Baader, Ensslin and Proll picked up Söhnlein on 1 April 1968 in Munich and arrived in Frankfurt am Main early in the morning of 2 April. They scouted department stores all day long. Shortly before the M. Schneider and Kaufhof stores on the Zeil closed, they set home-made incendiary devices with timed detonators that went off shortly before midnight. In the Kaufhof, part of the sporting goods and toy department burned. In Schneider's, the wall of a changing room on the first floor and a closet on the third floor burned. The damage caused by the incendiary devices was comparatively minor, but triggered the sprinkler systems. Shortly before the incendiary devices were triggered, Ensslin called the Frankfurt office of the Deutschen Presse-Agentur from a nearby payphone and said:

"There will soon be a fire at Schneider and in the Kaufhof. It is a political act.”

== Investigation and trial ==
The Frankfurt Kriminalpolizei quickly determined that arson had occurred due to the condition of the plastic bottles and travel alarm clocks found at all three sources of the fire. As early as 3 April, the management of the department stores offered a high reward for tips leading to the capture of the arsonists. On the morning of 4 April, Frankfurt police received a tip that led to the arrest of the four arsonists in Bockenheim.

The turbulent trial began on 14 October 1968 at the Frankfurt am Main regional court (Landgericht). The defendants, who were represented by the lawyers Otto Schily, Horst Mahler, Klaus Eschen and Ernst Heinitz, initially behaved in a conspicuously good mood and mocked the judge and public prosecutor. A photo that became particularly well-known depicts the four defendants in the dock, some of them with cigars in their mouths.

On 29 October 1968, the Frankfurt public prosecutor Walter Griebel demanded six years in prison for each of the defendants. The scope ranged from criminal damage to property to serious arson. The prosecutor referred to the night watchmen present and insisted that human lives had been endangered. It was claimed the entire city centre of Frankfurt was at risk of burning.

The Grand Criminal Chamber, chaired by the regional court director Gerhard Zoebe, only partially followed this ruling in its judgment on 31 October 1968 and imposed sentences of three years in prison for attempted arson causing endangerment of person (§ 306 StGB). The defendants perceived the verdict as arbitrary by the state, despite the presiding judge's acknowledgement that they had “a certain political motivation” in the reasons for the verdict. The interpretation of the “political happening” as a simple crime was particularly disappointing for the defendants. When Gudrun Ensslin was asked for a final word, she replied: “No. I don't want to give you the opportunity to give the impression that you are listening to me."“

=== Commentary on the trial ===
“It is in order that order defends itself against disorder, that the prevailing order defends itself against attempts to abolish it; anyone who disrupts the prevailing order must expect that it will strike if it can. That's why it was pointless to set fire to someone else's property on 2 April 1968; nothing else could be demonstrated with it. […] There are laws whose violation is less dangerous and yet more politically effective.” Uwe Nettelbeck, in Die Zeit, 8. November 1968.

“It remains that what is being litigated in Frankfurt is a matter for which imitation - apart from the enormous danger to the perpetrators, because of the threat of severe punishment - cannot be recommended. But what Fritz Teufel said at the SDS delegate conference also remains: 'It is still better to set fire to a department store than to run a department store.' Fritz Teufel can sometimes formulate things really well.” Ulrike Meinhof in: konkret 14/1968.

=== Unsuccessful appeal against the verdicts and escape ===
The defendants' lawyers filed an appeal. On 13 June 1969 - around 14 months after the arrest - further execution of the pre-trial arrest warrants was suspended and the defendants were bailed. On 10 November, the appeals were rejected. Andreas Baader, Gudrun Ensslin and Thorwald Proll went into hiding and initially fled to Paris. Only Horst Söhnlein began his prison sentence.

Proll separated from Ensslin and Baader in Paris in December 1969, turning himself in to the Berlin-Moabit public prosecutor's office on 21 November 1970. He was released early from prison in October 1971. Andreas Baader and Gudrun Ensslin returned to Berlin in February 1970. Andreas Baader was arrested there on 4 April 1970, following a tip from an informant, but was freed at gunpoint by Ulrike Meinhof and others on 14 May 1970, during a planned escape from the Tegel Prison. This action is considered the birth of the Red Army Faction (RAF).

== Film ==
The arson attacks were the inspiration for the 1969 TV film Brandstifter, produced for WDR by Klaus Lemke, with Margarethe von Trotta and Iris Berben as the leading actresses. The department store fires are also shown in the films The Baader Meinhof Complex and If Not Us, Who? (Wer wenn nicht wir).

== Bibliography ==
- Andreas Baader, Gudrun Ensslin, Thorwald Proll, Horst Söhnlein: We do not defend ourselves from such a justice system. Final word in the department store fire trial. With an afterword by Bernward Vesper and a statement from SDS Berlin. Edition Voltaire, Frankfurt am Main und Berlin 1968. (series: Voltaire Flugschrift 27)
- Statement by Andreas Baader, Gudrun Ensslin, Horst Söhnlein and Thorwald Proll, who were accused in the department store fire trial.. In: Charlie Kaputt Nr. 3, Dezember 1968, Berlin
- Rainer Langhans, Fritz Teufel: Steal me. StPO of Kommune I. Edition Voltaire, Frankfurt am Main und Berlin 1968 (series: Voltaire Handbuch 2); Reprints (without the pornographic supplement): Trikont Verlag, München 1977; Rixdorfer Verlagsanstalt, Berlin o. J. [1982]
- Bradley Martin: Blue Reality. Call for the dismantling of department store culture. Nova Press, Frankfurt am Main 1969
- Thorwald Proll, Daniel Dubbe: „ We came from another planet”. About 1968, Andreas Baader and a department store. Edition Nautilus, Hamburg 2003, ISBN 3-89401-420-2.
- Peter Szondi: Incitement to arson. An expert opinion in the Langhans/Teufel trial. In: Der Monat, Berlin, 19th year, issue 227, August 1967, pp. 24–29; expanded as a report on the “incitement to arson” - July 1967 / March 1968 in: Peter Szondi: About a “free (i.e. free) university”. Opinions of a philologist. Suhrkamp Verlag, Frankfurt am Main 1973 (series: es 620) pp. 34–54.
