= Wilhelm von Mirbach =

German diplomat (1871–1918)

Graf Wilhelm von Mirbach
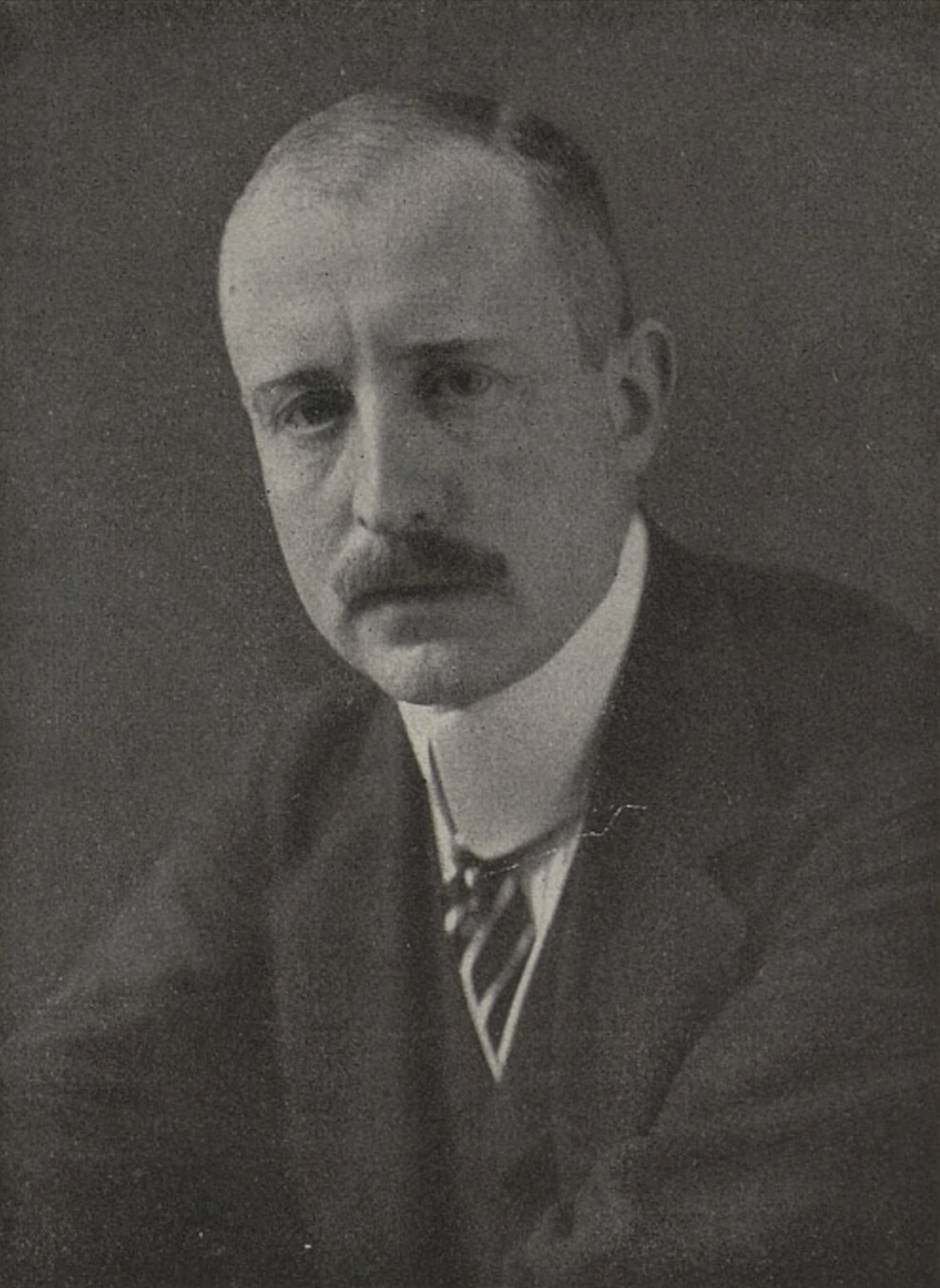
- Mirbach c. 1918

Ambassador of Germany to Russia
- In office April 1918 – July 1918
- Monarch: Wilhelm II

Personal details
- Born: 2 July 1871 Bad Ischl, Austria-Hungary
- Died: 6 July 1918 (aged 47) Moscow, Russian SFSR

Military service
- Allegiance: German Empire

Wilhelm Maria Theodor Ernst Richard Graf von Mirbach-Harff (2 July 1871 – 6 July 1918) was a German diplomat. He was assassinated by Left Socialist-Revolutionaries while serving as ambassador to Russia.

== Biography ==
=== Origin ===
Born on 2 July 1871, in Bad Ischl, to a Catholic Rhenan aristocratic family, he was a scion of Johann Wilhelm von Mirbach-Harff, founder of the Rhineland Knight academy. His parents were Ernst Graf von Mirbach and his wife Wilhelmine von Thun-Hohenstein (1851–1929).

=== Career ===
Mirbach started his diplomatic career in London, where he was Third Secretary at the German Embassy from 1899 to 1902, when he transferred to The Hague. From 1908 to 1911, Mirbach served as the embassy clerk in Saint Petersburg, and then as political councillor for the German military command in Bucharest. In 1915, he became the German ambassador in Greece, before being expelled from Athens in December 1916 when the Entente-leaning government of Eleftherios Venizelos took power.

He participated in the Russian-German negotiations in Brest-Litovsk from December 1917 to March 1918. He was appointed German ambassador to Russia in April 1918.

=== Assassination ===
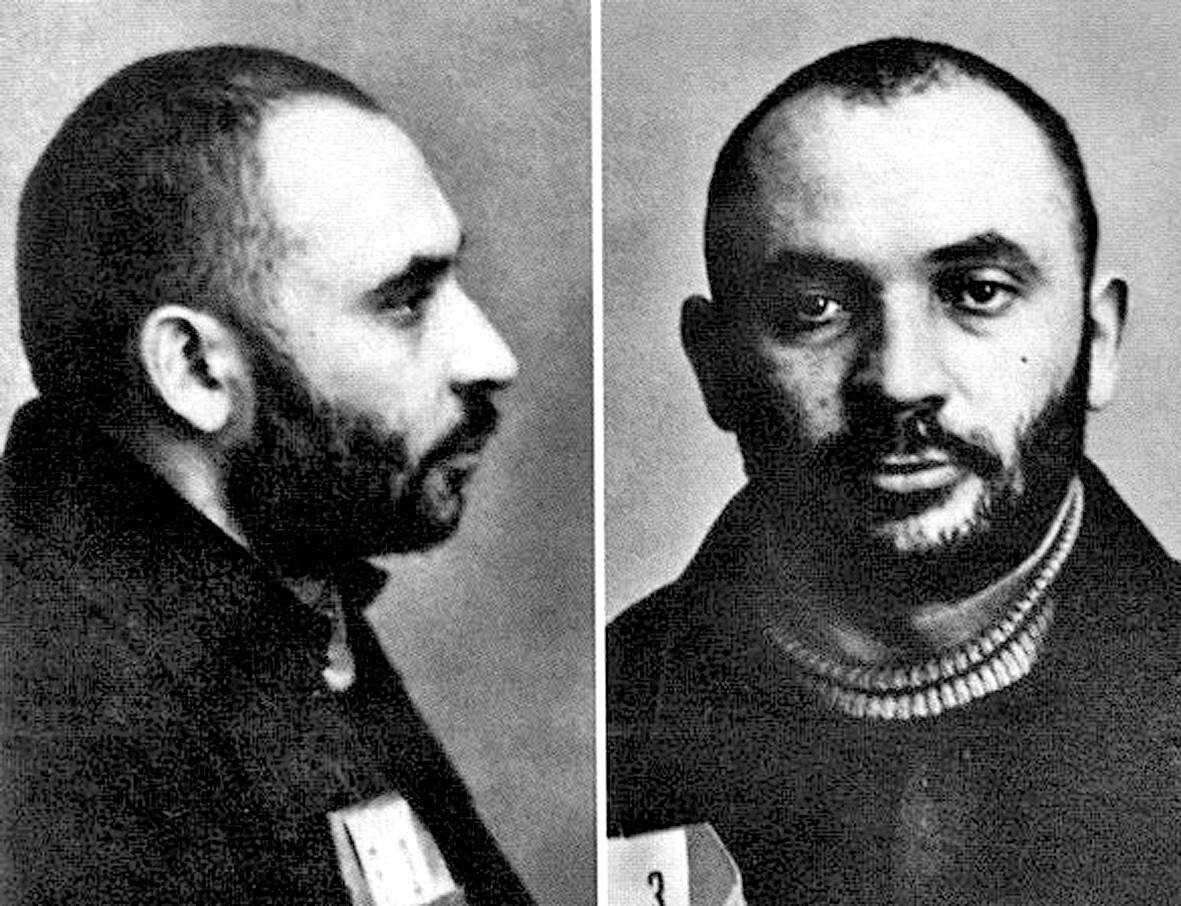
Yakov Blumkin

Mirbach was assassinated at the German embassy in Moscow by Yakov Grigorevich Blumkin and Nikolai Andreyev at the request of the Central Committee of the Left Socialist-Revolutionaries, who were trying to reignite the war between Russia and Germany. Blumkin entered Mirbach's residence in Moscow using forged papers and shot his victim at point blank range. As Mirbach tried to escape, Andreyev fired a second bullet and both of the assassins leapt out of the window and then drove away in a Cheka car. Mirbach's assassination signaled the beginning of the revolt of the Left Socialist-Revolutionaries in Moscow, on 6 July 1918.

The leader of the Cheka, Felix Dzerzhinsky, briefly resigned his post after the assassination of Mirbach, with Jēkabs Peterss briefly taking over as Cheka leader from 7 July 1918. Dzerzhinsky had wanted harsher Red Terror measures against Left SR terrorists. Dzerzhinsky returned to the Cheka leadership on 22 August 1918, and soon got his wish for harsher measures after 30 August 1918, when the head of the Petrograd Cheka, Moisei Uritsky, was assassinated, on the same day that Vladimir Lenin was the victim of a failed assassination attempt where he was shot with bullets.

Mirbach was succeeded as German ambassador to Russia by Karl Helfferich.

Coincidentally, a later relative, Andreas von Mirbach, would be murdered by the Red Army Faction at the West German Embassy siege in Stockholm in 1975.

== Honours ==
He received the following orders and decorations:

- Kingdom of Prussia:
  - Order of the Red Eagle, 4th class, 1900
