= Hitler's Children =

Hitler's Children may refer to:

- Children of Adolf Hitler, see Hitler's family
- Hitler's Children: The Story of the Baader-Meinhof Terrorist Gang, a 1977 book about a West German militant group
- Hitler's Children (1943 film), an American black-and-white propaganda film
- Hitler's Children (2011 film), an Israeli-German documentary film
