= Sabine Zimmermann (TV host) =

German television host (1951–2020)

- Born: 22 July 1951; Hanover, West Germany
- Died: 1 May 2020 (aged 68); Munich, Germany
- Occupations: Television presenter, producer
- Known for: Aktenzeichen XY… ungelöst

Sabine Zimmermann (22 July 1951 – 1 May 2020) was a German television host and producer, mainly known for her involvement with popular crime-solving programme Aktenzeichen XY… ungelöst.

== Biography ==
Zimmermann was the adopted daughter of journalist and television presenter Eduard Zimmermann, who died in 2009. She had originally aimed for a different career path, successfully completing training as a police photographer and working for the Munich Police Department for seven years. However, in 1983, after finishing business training, she joined her adoptive father's Ismaning-based production company as its managing director.

Between 1987 and 2001, she co-hosted Aktenzeichen XY… ungelöst, first alongside her father and later with Butz Peters. She continued to be the show's producer until 2011.

Zimmermann died on 1 May 2020, following a short, but severe illness.
