= Irmgard Möller =

Member of the German Red Army Faction (born 1947)

- Born: Irmgard Maria Elisabeth Möller; 13 May 1946 (age 80); Bielefeld, Germany
- Organization: Red Army Faction

Irmgard Maria Elisabeth Möller (born 13 May 1947) is a German former militant. She joined the far-left terrorist group Red Army Faction (RAF) in 1971. After participating in two bombings, she was arrested the following year. During the German Autumn of 1977, she was one of the prisoners demanded by the RAF to be freed and was part of an alleged suicide pact in Stammheim Prison with Andreas Baader, Gudrun Ensslin and Jan-Carl Raspe. The other three died and she survived, claiming it was an assassination attempt. She was released from prison in 1994.

== Early life ==
Irmgard Möller was born in 1947. In the late 1960s, she studied in Munich and participated in protests such as the occupation of the Institut für Zeitungswissenschaften. She joined the Tupamaros Munich and lived in a commune with Fritz Teufel. She joined the Red Army Faction (RAF) in 1971.

== RAF activity ==
In October 1971, Möller and fellow RAF members Margrit Schiller and Gerhard Müller were involved with a shootout with the police which ended with one officer dead and Schiller arrested. Both she and Schiller later said that Müller had shot the policeman. According to Müller, who later turned police informant, Möller and Angela Luther walked into the police headquarters in Augsburg and placed pipe bombs in empty offices on 12 May 1972. The subsequent explosions injured five policemen. Two weeks later, Möller, Luther, Andreas Baader and Holger Meins bombed the Campbell Barracks of the United States Army Europe and Africa in Heidelberg. Three soldiers were killed in the attack.

Recent RAF recruit Hans-Peter Konieczny was persuaded by the police to become an informant and betrayed Möller and Klaus Jünschke, who were both arrested on 9 July 1972 in Offenbach am Main. Möller received a sentence of four and a half years in prison and in January 1977 was moved to the high-security Stammheim Prison, where she inhabited a floor with fellow RAF militants Baader, Gudrun Ensslin and Jan-Carl Raspe.

== German Autumn ==
During the German Autumn of 1977, the powerful German industrialist and former SS officer Hanns Martin Schleyer was kidnapped on 5 September by the RAF. The group demanded the release of eleven prisoners, including Möller. In October, Lufthansa Flight 181 was hijacked by the Popular Front for the Liberation of Palestine in support of the RAF communique and then stormed by the GSG 9 special forces unit after it had landed in Somalia. The day after the failure of the hijack, the German authorities announced that Baader, Ensslin, Möller and Raspe had tried to kill themselves in a suicide pact. Baader and Ensslin died, whilst Raspe died of his wounds several hours later and Möller survived. In response, the RAF murdered Schleyer.

When she had recovered, Möller stated it was an assassination attempt and there was no suicide pact. She had been awakened around 04:30 on the morning of 17 October by loud bangs and she had not stabbed herself four times in her chest. Baader and Raspe had allegedly shot themselves, so questions were raised about how they had obtained guns in a supermax prison; Baader had powder burns on his right hand, but he was left-handed.

== Release ==
Möller was released from prison on 1 December 1994. She published a book in which the journalist Oliver Tolmein interviewed her about her time in the RAF.

== Selected works ==
- Tolmein, Oliver; Möller, Irmgard (2013). "RAF - das war für uns Befreiung": Ein Gespräch mit Irmgard Möller über bewaffneten Kampf, Knast und die Linke ["RAF - That was liberation for us": A conversation with Irmgard Möller about armed struggle, prison and the left] (5 ed.). Hamburg: Konkret-Literatur-Verl. ISBN 978-3894582173.

== See also ==
- Members of the Red Army Faction
