= Operation Leo =

Plot to kidnap the Swedish minister for immigration

Operation Leo was a plan to kidnap the Swedish minister for immigration, Anna-Greta Leijon, in 1977. The plan was devised by the second generation of the German Red Army Faction.

== Origins ==
The first generation of the group was also known as the Baader–Meinhof Group, after two of its founding members.

== Background ==
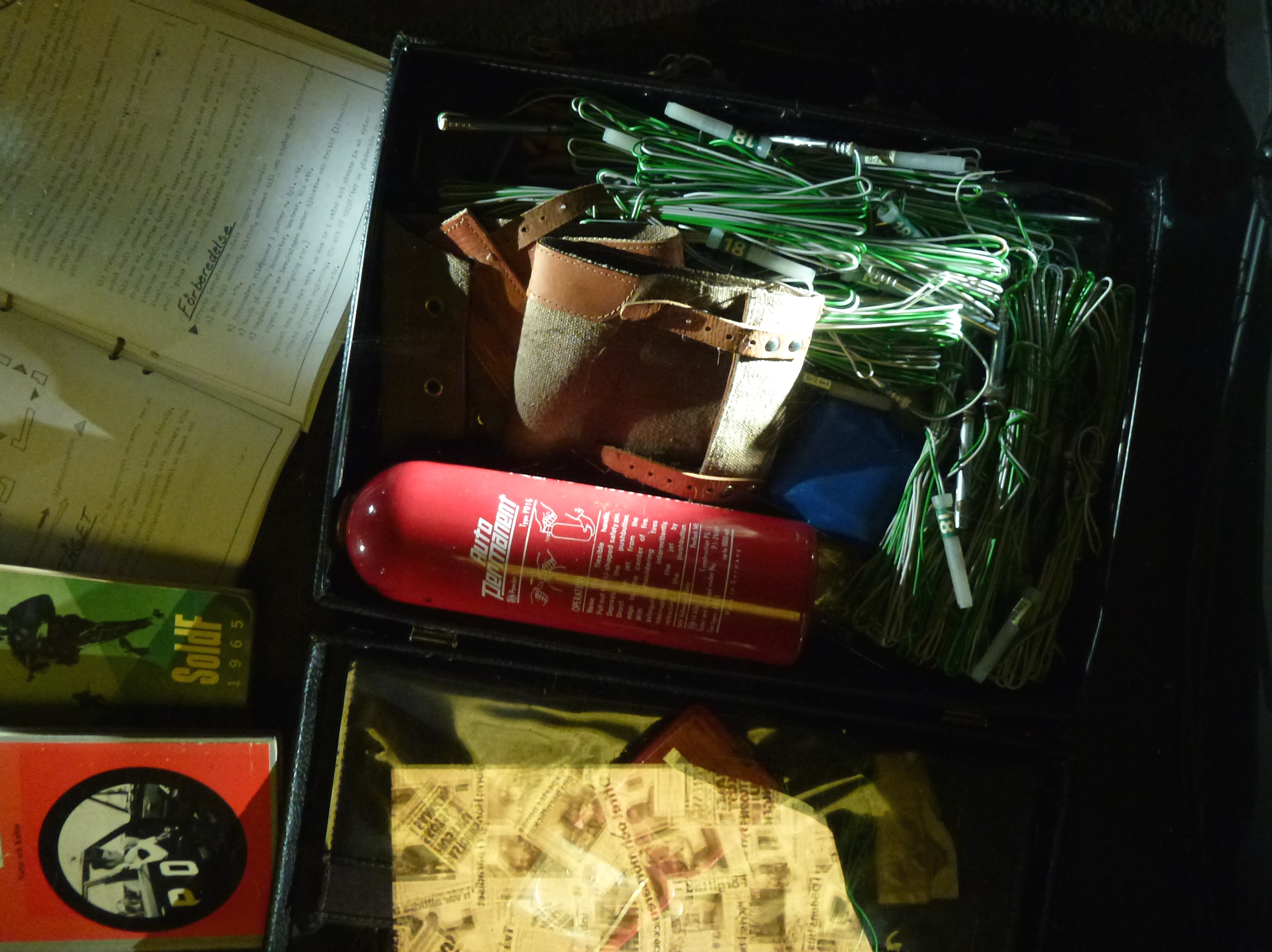
Norbert Kröcher's explosives bag, exhibited in the Police Museum

The Red Army Faction devised the plan as a direct consequence of the outcome of the 1975 West German embassy siege in Stockholm. A group of RAF members seized the embassy by force, demanding negotiations with the West German government. After the Swedish and German governments had employed stalling tactics the terrorists became impatient and allegedly started planning a violent break-out. A botched attempt to create a diversion led to an explosion and a massive fire. One terrorist, Siegfried Hausner, died from injuries sustained in the explosion in Stammheim Prison after being flown to Germany. The other members of the group were arrested as they tried to flee the premises.

If the plan to kidnap Leijon had been successful the group would have named their unit "Commando Siegfried Hausner".

== The operation ==
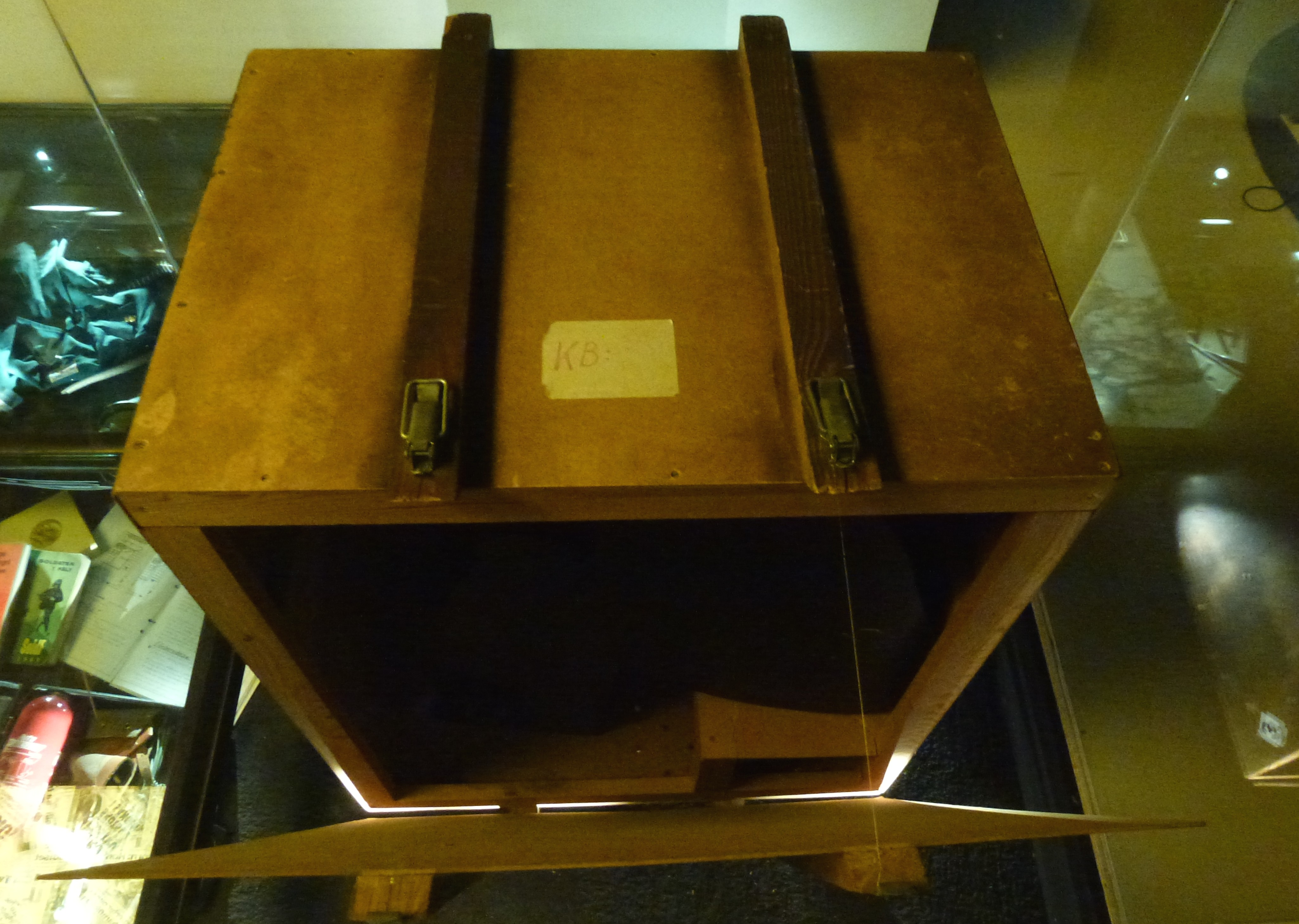
The box in which Anna Greta Leijon was to be kidnapped, exhibited in the Police Museum

Leijon was chosen because she held the highest political responsibility for the new Swedish anti-terrorist law, and the goal was to exchange Leijon for eight 'comrades' held in West German prisons. The group intended to put the minister in a wooden box so as to prevent her from hearing or seeing anything and subsequently moving her to another location.

The plan was extensive and complicated and included robbing banks and procuring weapons. However, unbeknownst to the Red Army Faction, the Swedish Security Service (Säpo) had them under close surveillance. Before the plan could be put into action the police arrested the entire group in an operation code-named "Ebba Röd".

During the investigation that followed, some 90 people were arrested. Many received prison terms, among them were:

- Lennart Warring, sentenced to four years in prison.
- Pia Laskar, sentenced to three years in prison.
- Anna-Karin Lindgren, sentenced to two years in prison.
- Katarina Motzi Ekelöf, sentenced to two years in prison.
- Eive Tungstedt, sentenced to six months in prison.
- Karl Gratzer, sentenced to three months in prison.

The leader of the group, Norbert Kröcher, was deported to Germany where he served out his prison sentence until released in 1985. After he was arrested, "Ebba Grön" was called out on the police radio. (Röd is the Swedish word for red, and Grön is the word for green. Ebba was the police code-name for Kröcher.) The Swedish punk band Ebba Grön, formed in 1977, named themselves after the code word used in the police operation.
