= Sabine Zimmermann =

Sabine Zimmermann may refer to:

- Sabine Zimmermann (TV host) (1951–2020), German television host and producer
- Sabine Zimmermann (politician) (born 1960), German politician
