= Kripo live =

- Country of origin: Germany

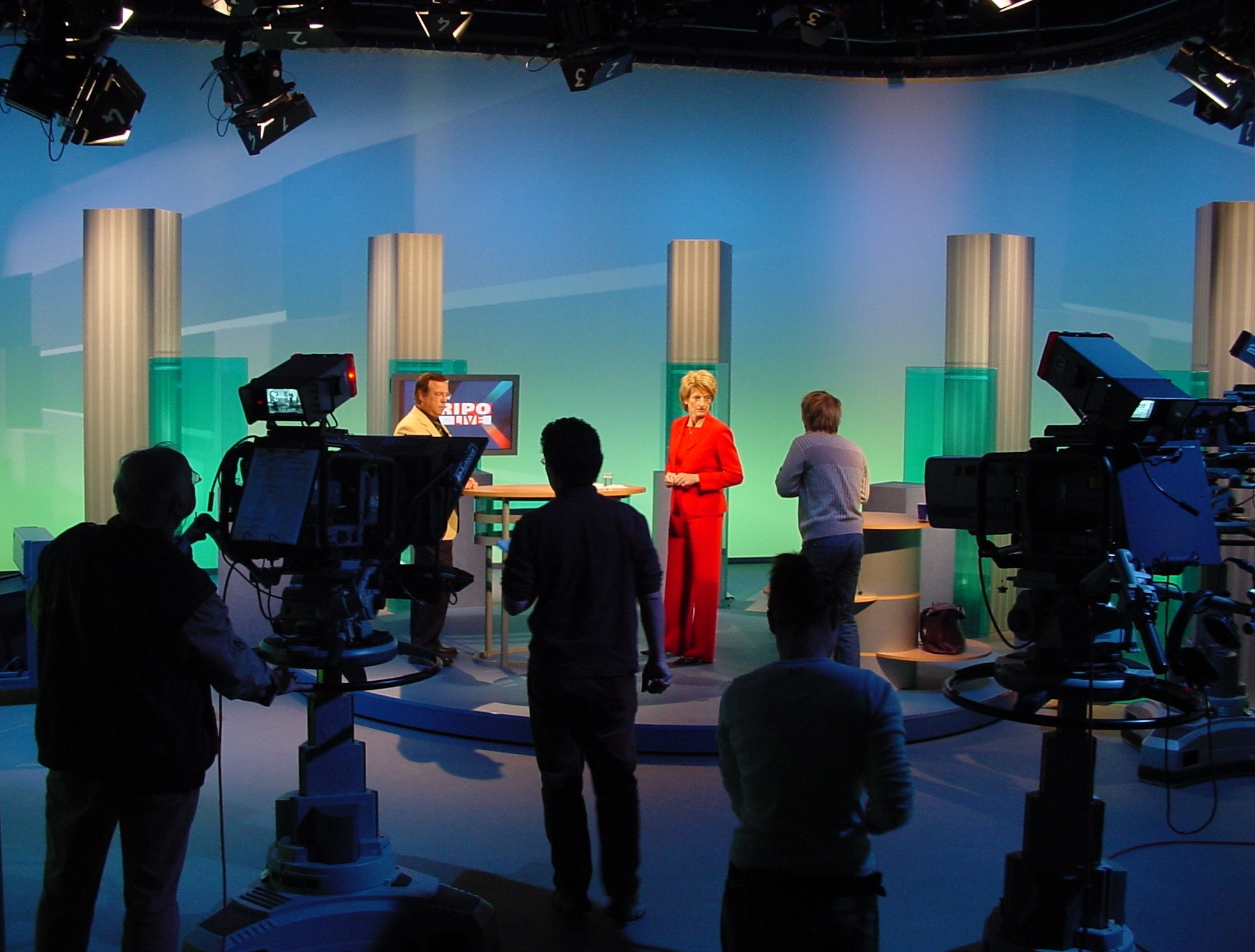
Kripo live-Set in 2005

Kripo live is a German television series.

Originally broadcast on DFF2 at irregular intervals and at different stations, it ran for the first time on May 19, 1990. After the shutdown of DFF2, the MDR took over the show on January 5, 1992, and has been broadcasting it every Sunday at 7:50 pm for 25 minutes.

In the broadcast, the criminal investigation department presents unresolved crimes and asks the viewers to make relevant information about the reconnaissance. In contrast to Aktenzeichen XY… ungelöst, Kripo live not only deals with capital crimes but also less serious crimes. The program was moderated by Heike Lebe, who later switched to the production team and gave the presentation to Birgit von Derschau, which led through the show until 2013. Her substitution was Steffi Kopp of the police in Thuringia.

The moderator and author Birgit von Derschau was honored in 2000 as Honorary Criminal Commissioner, in 2002 as Honorary Chief Criminal Commissioner and in 2011 as Honorary Chief Criminal Commissioner. She is an honorary member of the Federation of German Criminal Investigators.

Since the beginning of broadcasting, the audience has risen to the top of the reach of regional TV. Thus, Kripo live has become one of the most successful formats of German television.

On 27 June 1999, Dieter Zurwehme was searched for the murderer and a caller alone, due to the characteristics of the "backpack and walking stick", suspected of the significantly different-looking pensioner Friedhelm Beate, who was then shot dead by civilian guards.

The 1000th broadcast was broadcast on April 10, 2011. On 5 September 2013, the MDR announced that Birgit von Derschau would be replaced by Axel Bulthaupt from 6 October 2013. In addition, the studio moved from Dresden to Leipzig. Under Bulthaupt, the program for the criminal-technical documentation is being redesigned and there is an investigation and laboratory area, where Bulthaupt recreates the individual cases.

== See also ==
- List of German television series
