= Bo Holmström =

Swedish journalist and writer

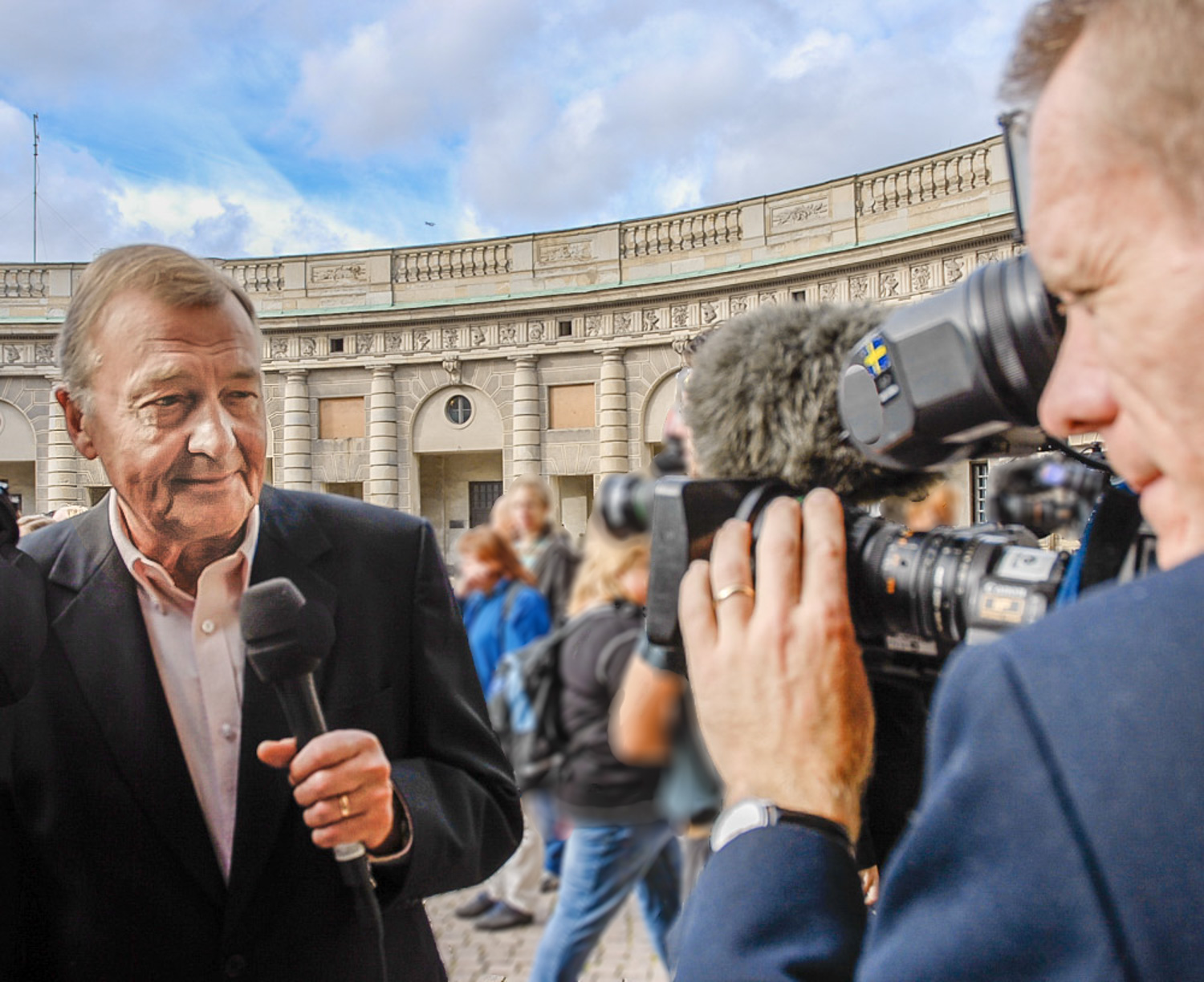
- Bo Holmström reports during the Reinfeldt Cabinet taking office in October 2006.
- Born: 18 October 1938; Stockholm, Sweden
- Died: 12 October 2017 (aged 78); Vagnhärad, Sweden
- Occupation: Journalist

Bo Eric Holmström (18 October 1938 – 12 October 2017) was a Swedish journalist, reporter and author. He worked as a reporter both for SVT and TV4. He was the Swedish reporter covering the Norrmalmstorg robbery in 1973 and the West German Embassy siege in Stockholm in 1975. On 11 September 2003 he was the first reporter to announce in media that Swedish Foreign Minister Anna Lindh had died from injuries sustained after an attack earlier that same day. He was reporting from Karolinska hospital for TV4. In 2007 he was awarded the Stora journalistpriset for his journalism work. In 2015, he was awarded an honorary Kristallen at the Kristallen awards.

In 2016, gangrene in his leg led to its amputation. He spent his last year at a nursing home in Vagnhärad and died on 12 October 2017, 6 days before his 79th birthday.
