= Aktenzeichen XY... ungelöst =

German television programme

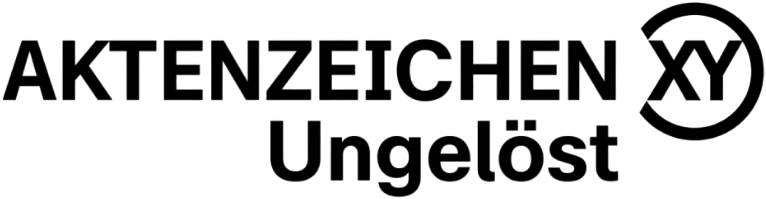
- Created by: Eduard Zimmermann
- Presented by: Eduard Zimmermann (1967–1997); Thaddäus "Teddy" Podgorski (1968–1971); Peter Nidetzky (1971–2002); Werner Vetterli (1969–1976); Konrad Toenz (1979–1998); Stephan Schifferer (1998–2002); Sabine Zimmermann (1987–2001); Butz Peters (1997–2001); Rudi Cerne (2002–present)
- Narrated by: Wolfgang Grönebaum (1967–1989); Isolde Thümmler (1985–2005); Michael Brennicke (1989–2019); Joachim Höppner (2001–2006); Christian Baumann (2019–present)
- Opening theme: Heinz Kiessling; Ernst-August Quelle
- Countries of origin: (West) Germany (1967–present); Austria (1968–2002); Switzerland (1969–2003)
- Original language: German

Production
- Executive producer: Claus Legal
- Running time: 90 minutes
- Production companies: Securitel, ZDF

Original release
- Network: ZDF; ORF (1968–2002); SRF (1969–2003)
- Release: 20 October 1967 – present

Aktenzeichen XY... ungelöst ("Case number XY... unsolved") is a German interactive television programme first broadcast on 20 October 1967 on ZDF. Created by Eduard Zimmermann, it aims to combat and solve crimes. The programme is currently presented by Rudi Cerne. It airs monthly, with 12 episodes in a year, on Wednesday at 8:15 PM.

From March 1968 until December 2002, it was produced in cooperation with the Austrian public service broadcaster ORF and Schweizer Fernsehen, a division of the Swiss public broadcaster SRG SSR, who joined in January 1969 and left in December 2003. The programme was adapted by the BBC as Crimewatch and for the US market as America's Most Wanted. Other adaptations of the format were aired in a number of countries including Ireland, Israel, Italy, Netherlands, New Zealand, Poland and Sweden.

== Format ==
The goal of the programme is to cast light on unsolved offences with the aid of viewers. Each episode contains three to five short films, each lasting about ten minutes, in which a real criminal case is reconstructed. The cases are mostly complex ones in which the criminals and chains of events are still unknown. In addition, cases are discussed in the studio in which, for example, the identities of criminals or unknown murder victims are sought with the aid of a photo. Viewers can use the telephone or internet to give information. According to a study by the programme's editorial department, about forty percent of cases shown on the programme are solved.

== History ==
Logo used from the early-2000s until October 2014

Logo used since October 2014

The creator and first presenter of the programme was Eduard Zimmermann. A large audience watched the show; of the first 153 unsolved crimes, viewers helped solve 82. One murder was solved less than a day after its television depiction. After the programme's 300th episode he passed the presentership onto Butz Peters, who fronted the show together with Zimmermann's daughter Sabine. Since 18 January 2002 Aktenzeichen XY has been presented by Rudi Cerne.

With Aktenzeichen XY Eduard Zimmermann and ZDF succeeded in starting a TV format that had not existed worldwide until 1967. Although news reports had often shown photofits, an actual independent show of this type was unknown at this time.

The idea came to Zimmermann during his work with the programme Vorsicht Falle! (Eng: Beware, Trap!) first broadcast in 1963, in which he warned the viewers of "Nepper, Schlepper und Bauernfänger" (Eng: Scammers, Hustlers and Conmen). The viewers frequently sent him information regarding descriptions of the fraudsters on the programme. This gave him the idea to use the medium of TV to work with the police on unsolved crimes. In a biographical statement Zimmerman also admitted that his motivation for both programmes was partly a personal one; he himself is a victim of fraud.

Aktenzeichen XY was initially produced in the ZDF studios in Wiesbaden, before moving to the FSM studios in Unterföhring from 1969. From 15 March 1968, the Austrian public broadcaster ORF became a joint producer of Aktenzeichen XY, with a segment focusing on Austria hosted first by Thaddäus "Teddy" Podgorski (de) from 1968 until 1971, then by Peter Nidetzky from 1971 until 2002; which from 24 January 1969 was also joined by Schweizer Fernsehen (SF), with a segment focused on Switzerland hosted firstly by Werner Vetterli from 1969 until 1976, then by Konrad Toenz from 1976 until 1998, and finally Stephan Schifferer from 1998 until 2002.

An attempt to extend Aktenzeichen XY beyond West Germany first took place on 18 July 1969, when ZDF and the Dutch public broadcaster NOS produced a joint episode featuring Dutch journalist Johan van Minnen from a studio in Enschede, with NOS providing simultaneous translations from German to Dutch. That project was however unsuccessful due to language barriers and was abandoned after said broadcast. A more successful attempt took place on 14 July 1972, when the West German branch of the American Forces Network (AFN) took part in a broadcast of Aktenzeichen XY, with simultaneous interpretation into English on AFN TV. The first colour episode of Aktenzeichen XY aired on ZDF on 16 January 1975.

On 8 November 2002, the broadcast of the 350th episode was celebrated, after Aktenzeichen XY had been on the air for 35 years. Eduard Zimmermann was the guest of Rudi Cerne on his own programme, which concerned a several-decades-old crime that had particularly touched him – the Ursula Herrmann kidnapping, about a young girl who was buried alive in a crate for extortion on 15 September 1981 (a case similar to the case of Barbara Jane Mackle.) At the time 3,228 cases had been featured on the show, of which 1,182 had been solved. 1,880 people had been sought and 914 of them had been caught. This included 624 murder cases.

In April 2012 the program received international public attention of a somewhat amusing nature when one of its case re-enactment performers, German actor Aaron Defant, was erroneously arrested in Stuttgart following his portrayal of a jewel robber in the episode of 14 March 2012 and a call to the police by one of the program's viewers. This misunderstanding was, however, cleared very swiftly.

A 2-hour special episode of Aktenzeichen XY aired on 16 October 2013, dealing with the case of Madeleine McCann, who disappeared in Portugal in 2007 at the age of three. McCann's parents and a Scotland Yard detective were also featured in the broadcast. A record 24.3% audience share was recorded in that episode alone. On 3 June 2020, the Criminal Police Office presented a new suspect on Aktenzeichen XY... ungelöst and made a public appeal again for information relating to the case. The police stated that they received useful information regarding the new suspect in 2013 after the case was first featured on Aktenzeichen XY, but that it took years to find substantial evidence for prosecution, and that they still need more information.

The programme is known for its high viewership across all age groups. In 2014, Aktenzeichen XY was watched by around six million viewers, with an audience share of 20%.

== Similar formats ==
=== In Germany ===
The private broadcaster Sat.1 and the public broadcaster MDR both produced similar programmes, known as Fahndungsakte (English: Manhunt Files) and Kripo live respectively. Sat.1 cancelled Fahndungsakte in 2000 after a three years' run due to low audience figures. MDR has had more success with Kripo Live on air since May 1990, which concentrates on Kriminalpolizei. Sat.1 briefly aired a revival of the format, titled Fahndung Deutschland, in 2016.

Others include Täter – Opfer – Polizei (ORB Fernsehen later RBB Fernsehen, since 1992), Crime! – Der Justizreport (HR-Fernsehen, 2004), Ungeklärte Morde – Dem Täter auf der Spur zeigt (RTL II, 2002–2003 and 2011–2013), Kriminalreport (NDR Fernsehen and WDR Fernsehen, 2008–2011; Das Erste, 2018 and its regional versions Maintower kriminalreport (HR, 2014–2021) and Kriminalreport Südwest, which was later retitled Vorsicht Verbrechen (SR Fernsehen, 2018–2020).

=== Internationally ===
The format has been sold to several countries, including Great Britain where it has been known as Crimewatch (originally Crimewatch UK) since 1984 and has spawned a number of spin-offs, one of which is still on air (the daytime version, Crimewatch Live) as of 2023. Crime NI, a regional version was broadcast monthly in Northern Ireland from September 2021 to April 2022. Previously, a localised version for the English Midlands ran for five series from 1987 to 1991.

Aktenzeichen XY is the first German television format to have entered the American market, where it is known as America's Most Wanted and was originally broadcast from 1988 to 2013 before being revived in 2021.

Other versions include:

- Australia (Australia's Most Wanted, 1988–1999; Wanted, 2013)
- Austria (Fahndung Österreich, since 2021)
- Belgium (Telefacts Crime, 2008–2013; Faroek, since 2013)
- Brazil (Linha Direta, 1990, 1999–2007, 2023–2024)
- Denmark (Station 2 Efterlyst, since 2001)
- Finland (Poliisi-TV (originally PTV – suunta 931), 1989–2013)
- France (Témoin numéro 1, 1993–1996; Crimes, 2013–2021; Appel à témoins, since 2021)
- Hong Kong (Police Report, 1973–2020; Brought to Justice, 1985–1997)
- Hungary (Kékfény, 1964–1989; Kriminális, 1991–1999; 112, 1999–2001; Kékfény, since 2002)
- India (India's Most Wanted, 1999–2005)
- Ireland (Crimeline, 1992–2003; Crimecall, since 2004)
- Israel (Crime Investigation, 1986)
- Italy (Chi l'ha visto?, since 1989)
- Netherlands (Opsporing Verzocht, 1975–1976, since 1982; Crime Desk, 2021)
- New Zealand (Crimewatch, 1987–1996; NZI Crimescene, 1997–1998)
- Norway (I søkelyset, 1990–1991; Øyenvitne, 1992–1997; Efterlyst, 1998–2000, 2007–2008; Åsted Norge, since 2016)
- Poland (Magazyn Kryminalny 997, 1986–2010, 2017–2023; 997: Fajbusiewicz na tropie, 2013–2017)
- Singapore (Crimewatch, since 1986)
- Sweden (Efterlyst, since 1990)
- United Kingdom (Crime Monthly (later Crime Weekly), LWT, 1989–1998; Britain's Most Wanted, ITV, 1998–2000; Manhunt – Solving Britain's Crimes, 2006–2007)

== Literature ==
- Ummenhofer, Stefan and Thaidigsmann, Michael: Aktenzeichen XY... ungelöst – Kriminalität, Kontroverse, Kult ISBN 3-9809278-1-4
