= Jan-Carl Raspe =

German left-wing militant (1944–1977)

- Born: 24 July 1944; Seefeld in Tirol, Ostmark, Germany
- Died: 18 October 1977 (aged 33); Stuttgart, West Germany
- Cause of death: Gunshot wound
- Occupations: German militant; convicted criminal
- Organization: Red Army Faction

Jan-Carl Raspe (24 July 1944 – 18 October 1977) was a member of the German far-left terrorist group the Red Army Faction (RAF). He was involved in five bomb attacks with four fatalities, was arrested in 1972 and committed suicide in custody in 1977.

== Early life ==
Raspe was born in Seefeld in Tirol (then Germany, now Austria). He was described as gentle but had difficulty communicating with other people. His father, a businessman, died before his birth and Raspe and his two older sisters were raised by his mother and two aunts. Although living in East Berlin, he went to West Berlin when the Berlin Wall was built in 1961, and stayed there, living with his uncle and aunt. He co-founded Kommune II in 1967 and joined the Red Army Faction, also known as the "Baader-Meinhof Group", in 1970.

== Militancy ==
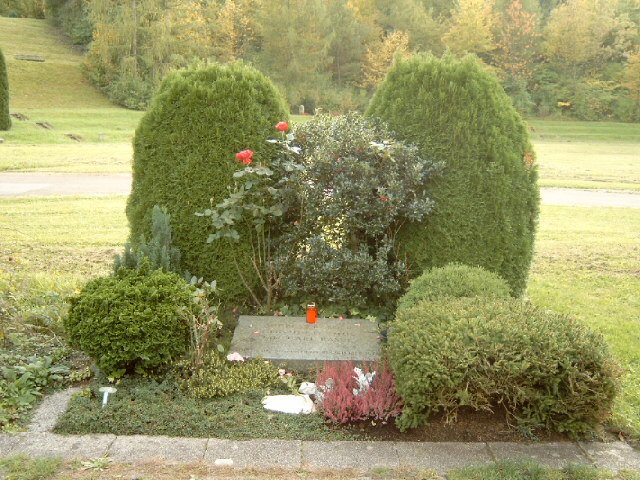
Burial site of Baader, Raspe and Ensslin

Raspe had technical skills, and is believed to have made the bombs for the May 1972 offensive. In that year, Raspe was involved in five bomb attacks that killed four people and injured over 50.

On 1 June 1972, Raspe along with Andreas Baader and Holger Meins had gone to check on a garage in Frankfurt where they had been storing materials used to make incendiary devices. Raspe had gone along as the driver (they were driving a Porsche Targa). However, as soon as they arrived at the garage, police began to swarm around the scene. Meins and Baader had already entered the garage and were surrounded but Raspe, who had remained by the car, fired a shot from his gun and tried to run away when he was rushed by police, but to no avail; he was caught and arrested in a nearby garden. Meins and Baader were arrested soon after.

Raspe was convicted on 28 April 1977 and sentenced to life imprisonment. On 18 October 1977, Raspe was found with a gunshot wound in his cell in Stammheim Prison, Stuttgart. He died shortly after being admitted to a hospital. Fellow RAF members and inmates Baader and Gudrun Ensslin were found dead in their cells the same morning. Irmgard Möller was found in her cell, wounded after supposedly stabbing herself in the chest, but survived. The official inquiry concluded that this was a collective suicide, but again alternative theories abounded.

== Commando Jan Raspe ==
The Red Army Faction created in 1984 the "Commando Jan Raspe" in solidarity and remembrance of him. The commando parked a car loaded with explosives in front of the NATO School in Oberammergau. The cadres for NATO's integrated staff were trained there. The car was noticed and the bomb was defused. RAF said the aim of the action was to eliminate the military there.

- Members of the RAF
