= Eduard Zimmermann =

German journalist and television presenter

- Zimmermann presenting Aktenzeichen XY... ungelöst, October 1967
- Born: 4 February 1929; Munich, Germany
- Died: 19 September 2009 (aged 80); Munich, Germany
- Occupations: Journalist, Television presenter
- Spouse: Rosmarie Zimmermann (m. 1960–2008; her death)
- Children: Sabine Zimmermann

Eduard "Ede" Zimmermann (4 February 1929 – 19 September 2009) was a German journalist, television presenter and security expert. He was the creator and long-time host of Aktenzeichen XY... ungelöst, a German television show that pioneered interactive true crime television and thus became the model for the British Crimewatch and American America's Most Wanted.

== Life ==
Eduard Zimmermann was born on 4 February 1929 in Alte Heide in the borough of Schwabing-Freimann in Munich, Germany to a teenage mother who worked as a waitress. Shortly before the Second World War Zimmermann moved to his grandparents house in Ottobrunn. At the end of the war Zimmermann moved to the city of Magdeburg where his mother had married a hotelier, and where Zimmermann was first employed at his stepfather's hotel.

Following the Second World War the man who would later be known as a 'criminal hunter' and 'crook's bane' eked out a living as a thief and black market trader, for which he served a sentence at Fuhlsbüttel Prison. With a false identity and diploma he finally found work as a roadworks engineer in Sweden.

Zimmermann returned to the Soviet occupation zone in Germany on an assignment for Dagens Nyheter newspaper. There he was charged with espionage in 1950 and sentenced to 25 years in prison. He served five years of his sentence in Bautzen and was released early on 17 January 1954 in the run-up to the Berlin Conference.

Subsequently, he worked as a journalist and editor at NDR and ZDF.

From 20 October 1967 to 24 October 1997 Zimmermann presented 300 episodes of the ZDF TV series Aktenzeichen XY... ungelöst (Case number XY … Unsolved), whom he also co-hosted with his adopted daughter Sabine from 6 November 1987 until 24 October 1997 (Sabine would remain at the said programme until 7 December 2001), as well as 180 episodes from 1964 to 1997 of Vorsicht Falle! – Nepper, Schlepper, Bauernfänger (Beware, Trap! – Scammers, Hustlers, Conmen). He then retired from the television business and maintained an Internet security portal in co-operation with ZDF.

Zimmermann was a co-founder of Weisser Ring e.V. (White Ring), an organisation that assists victims of crimes, and was its chairman for many years.

On the occasion of Aktenzeichen XY's hundredth episode on 7 October 1977 Zimmermann received the Order of Merit of the Federal Republic of Germany on ribbon, presented by Federal President Walter Scheel, and was subsequently awarded the Order of Merit First Class on 16 June 1986, presented by Federal President Richard von Weizsäcker. In 1982 he received the Humanitarian Award of the German Freemasons.

Zimmermann himself revealed his past as a criminal in 2005 through his autobiography, titled Auch ich war ein Gauner (I was a crook too). In a newspaper interview he said that his time as a criminal had made him tough:

"You might say I am living proof that you can come back down from the crooked tracks if that's what you really want."

Zimmermann's last appearance on TV was on the 400th episode of Aktenzeichen XY on 10 May 2007. He died on 19 September 2009 in Munich from dementia.

== Notes and references ==
=== References ===
- Zimmermann, Eduard; Oettinger, Renate (2012). Aktenzeichen XY : auch ich war ein Gauner (in German). München: Riva. ISBN 978-3-86413-223-0. OCLC 846960561.
