= Volker Stelzmann =

German painter

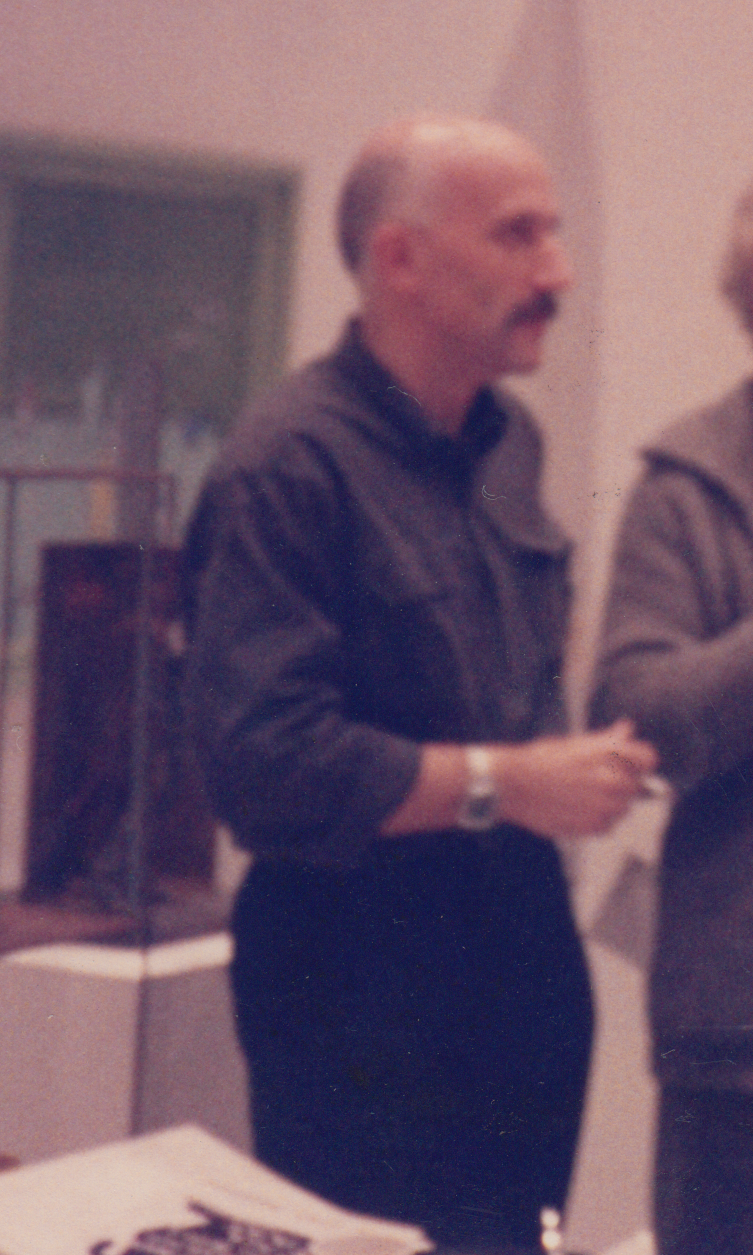
- Stelzmann at Art Cologne in 1985
- Born: 5 November 1940; Dresden, Saxony, Germany
- Occupations: Painter, graphic artist
- Spouse: Henriette Arndt

Volker Stelzmann (born 5 November 1940) is a German painter and graphic artist.

== Life ==
Born in Dresden, Volker Stezmann was the third recorded child of a railway official Kurt Stelzmann and his wife Charlotte. He was born some eighteen months after a resumption of general European war had been triggered when Europe's two leading dictatorships had launched a military rerun of the Partitions of Poland. Stelzmann's father was killed in the fighting in 1944. Early in 1945 much of Dresden was destroyed by two nights of intensive bombing. Volker Stelzmann survived, but in 1948 the remaining family members relocated to Leipzig which is where Volker Stelzmann grew up and where for more than two decades he would build his artistic and academic career. After leaving middle school, between 1957 and 1960 he undertook an apprenticeship in precision mechanics, continuing with this type of work till 1963. Simultaneously he was attending evening classes at the Hochschule für Grafik und Buchkunst Leipzig, where he was at this stage taught by Walter Münze (1895-1978).

In 1963 he became a full-time student at the Hochschule where he studied with Gerhard Kurt Müller. He was taught the more basic elements of art and graphic art by Fritz Fröhlich, Hans Mayer-Foreyt and Harry Blume. All this led to his degree in 1968. While he was studying he also had the opportunity to come to terms with the essays of Michel de Montaigne. Two years before he graduated, in 1966 he had his first exhibition, jointly with Ulrich Hatulla. This exhibition took place in Ahrenshoop. Subsequently, his work was included in important exhibitions both within the German Democratic Republic and abroad.

From 1968 he pursued a career as a free-lance artist. He had undertaken the first of several study trips to the Soviet Union in 1966, and during the next few years he was also able to visit Bulgaria, Cuba and India. Between 1970 and 1986 he was a member of the National League of Visual Artists, serving as chairman of the organisation's national executive from 1978. He returned to the HfGuB for post-graduate study in 1973, and was teaching there from 1975. He was given a lectureship and appointed a department head at this institution in 1979. In 1982 he became a full professor, and he continued to teach at the HfGuB till 1986.

By the time Stelzmann was grown up the slaughter of war and subsequent large-scale emigration from East Germany had left the country increasingly short of working-age population and after 1961 the government created an increasingly sophisticated set of systems and controls to prevent its remaining citizens from escaping. Travel privileges based on his artistic status nevertheless gave Stolzmann the opportunity to "escape" in 1986 when he returned from an exhibition in Oberhausen (in West Germany) not to the German Democratic Republic but to the enclave of West Berlin which was outside the control of the East German government. Remaining in the west, between 1987 and 1988 he held a guest professorship at the Städelschule (fine arts academy) in Frankfurt am Main. In 1988 he was appointed Professor for Painting at the Berlin Fine Arts Academy (as it was then called). This prompted a protest from the painter Georg Baselitz who now resigned his own teaching position at the university, condemning Stelzmann as a "party-line East German artist". (Baselitz, like Stelzmann, had begun his artistic career in the German Democratic Republic, although he had made his own "escape to the west", after falling foul of the country's political rulers, back in 1958.) Stelzmann retained his professorship at the Berlin University of the Arts (as the Fine Arts Academy had by now become) till 2006.

Evaluation

"Already in the 1970s Stelzmann is painting - sometimes dramatically, sometimes covertly - scenes of a youth as wild in the east of the divided Germany as in its western part. He shows social conflict, and distortions, deep loneliness, conflicts, and violent outbreaks. Unusually in East Germany, he observed the political turmoil of those times in the west, and in particular shared in the turbulence of the "'68 generation". He followed and painted the Baader-Meinhof drama, up to the culminating collective suicide in Stammheim, he mourned Rudi Dutschke with an epitaph, and produced a series of pictures of open and secret anarchists, the demonstrators and "Amokläufern" (Ammunition throwers), as one of the pictures was entitled. His painted observations included bludgeoning police, rockers and punks, and quietly blended in self-portraits, along with portraits of his friends. In retrospect his depictions seem prophetic. They anticipate the street protests and uprisings of 1989. But they also reflect a premonition of social neglect and of the aimless and aggressive young people who make the streets unsafe, above all in the unemployment black spots of former East Germany. At the time, however, East German gallery-goers would have seen such images only as representing disenfranchisement of angry youth in the evil decadent west, while any underlying youth problems in the German Democratic Republic remained out of sight. Stelzmann himself never concerned himself in sociological interactions, causes and outcomes. He was moved by the many diverse manifestations of the people themselves - protagonists and victims and the many "extras". In this way he made his own a maxim more usually associated with Otto Dix, that the artist themselves do not teach and instruct, but should bear radical witness, not in order to understand and present the "sin", where they were not themselves its perpetrator.

Stelzmann schildert schon in den siebziger Jahren – manchmal drastisch, manchmal verdeckter – Szenen einer wilden Jugend im Osten wie im Westen, er zeigt soziale Konflikte und Deformationen, abgründige Einsamkeiten, Konflikte, Ausbrüche der Gewalt. Der Maler hatte als Beobachter im Osten wie kein zweiter an den politischen Umbrüchen im Westen, besonders an den Turbulenzen der 68er-Generation teilgenommen. Er verfolgte und malte das Baader-Meinhof-Drama bis zum kollektiven Selbstmord in Stammheim, betrauerte in einem Epitaph Dutschke, widmete Serien von Bildern den latenten wie den offenen Anarchisten, den Demonstranten und „Amokläufern" (so ein Bildtitel), der Apo samt knüppelnder Polizei, den Rockern und Punkern und mischte sich mit seinem Selbstbildnis und den Porträts seiner Freunde unter sie. Diese Bilder muten im Rückblick wie Prophetie an. Sie nahmen die Straßen-Demonstrationen und das revolutionäre Aufbegehren von 1989 vorweg. Sie geben aber auch eine Vorahnung von einer sozial verwahrlosenden, ziellosen und aggressiven Jugend, die heute die Straßen vor allem im arbeitslosen Osten unsicher machen. Damals dachten die DDR-Aufseher, ihr Maler habe nur den bösen, dekadenten Westen im Visier und übersahen, dass vor allem sie selber und die verdrängten und unterdrückten Jugendprobleme im eigenen Land gemeint waren. Stelzmann interessierten nie gesellschaftliche Zusammenhänge, nicht Ursache und Wirkung. Ihn bewegt auf vielfach exaltierte Weise der Mensch selber – der Täter und das Opfer und die vielen Statisten. Dabei machte er sich die Maxime von Dix zu eigen, dass Künstler nicht bessern und belehren, sondern radikal bezeugen sollen, ja dass sie die „Sünde" nicht verstehen und darstellen können, wenn sie diese nicht selbst begangen haben.

Volker Stelzmann continues to work in Berlin-Charlottenburg where he lives with his wife Henriette whom he married in 1988. His works continue to feature in exhibitions, and despite his defection back in 1986, his work has continued to be celebrated in Leipzig.

== Awards and honours (not necessarily a complete list) ==
- 1978: Art Prize of the German Democratic Republic
- 1983: National Prize of East Germany for Arts and Literature 3rd class
