= Andreas von Mirbach =

German diplomat (1931–1975)

Andreas Baron von Mirbach
- Born: 9 April 1931; Riga, Latvia
- Died: 24 April 1975 (aged 44); Stockholm, Sweden
- Cause of death: Murdered by terrorists during the West German Embassy siege in Stockholm
- Occupations: Lieutenant colonel; Defense attaché
- Spouse: Christa von Roth
- Children: Clais and Verena (twins)

Andreas Baron von Mirbach (9 April 1931, in Riga – 24 April 1975, in Stockholm) was a West German lieutenant colonel in the Bundeswehr and defense attaché at the German Embassy in Stockholm. There he was murdered by Red Army Faction terrorists who were raiding the embassy during the West German Embassy siege in Stockholm.

== Life ==
Andreas Baron von Mirbach was the second of three sons of the Baltic German Baron Ernst von Mirbach (1888–1968) and Erica née von Gernet (1899–1992).

From 1946 to 1952, Mirbach attended the Carl-Hunnius Boarding School in Wyk auf Föhr. After graduating from school, Mirbach began training as a poultry farmer in Nice and Ludwigsburg, after which he worked at the State Agricultural Institute in Wiad (near Stockholm) for a year in 1955. During this time, he learned Swedish.

In 1955, Mirbach joined the newly founded Bundeswehr as an officer candidate and one of the first soldiers. In 1959 he became company commander of a company in the Panzergrenadier. From 1963 to 1965, he trained as an officer in the General Staff Service at the Bundeswehr Command and Staff College in Hamburg. This was followed by assignments on the staff of NATO and in an armored brigade until 1969, after which he worked as a teaching staff officer at the Command and Staff College. In January 1973, Mirbach began training as a military attaché and in the summer of 1973 was transferred to the German Embassy in Stockholm as a defense attaché.

In July 1958, von Mirbach married Christa von Roth. The marriage produced twins Clais Oluv and Inga Verena.

As a military attaché, Mirbach was murdered by Red Army Faction (RAF) terrorists during the hostage-taking at the German embassy in Stockholm in April 1975. After the Swedish police had occupied the basement of the embassy, the hostage-takers commissioned Mirbach to negotiate. The negotiations lasted about an hour. One of the hostage-takers' demands was that Mirbach should persuade the police officers to leave the first floor of the embassy building they were occupying, otherwise he would be shot. When the police did not comply with the demand to withdraw after the ultimatum had been extended several times, Mirbach was shot from behind at close range by one of the hostage-takers with five shots to the head, back, pelvis and legs and thrown head first down the stairs. It was not until an hour later that two Swedish police officers stripped down to their underpants, were allowed to rescue Mirbach, who died two hours later after an operation at Stockholm University Hospital. After the shots were fired, the police retreated into an outbuilding. It is unclear who of the RAF fired the shots, as there were no neutral witnesses and the RAF terrorists have so far remained silent. (Note: Butz Peters: Der Terror von Stockholm - Die Welt, 25 April 2005.)

Andreas von Mirbach's name can be found on the memorial wall in the Berlin office of the Federal Foreign Office.

== Family ==
- from 1958, wife Christa née von Roth (born 1933)
- Children: the twins Clais and Verena (born 1963)
