= Alun Gwynne Jones, Baron Chalfont =

British politician (1919–2020)

Lieutenant-Colonel The Right Honourable The Lord Chalfont OBE MC PC
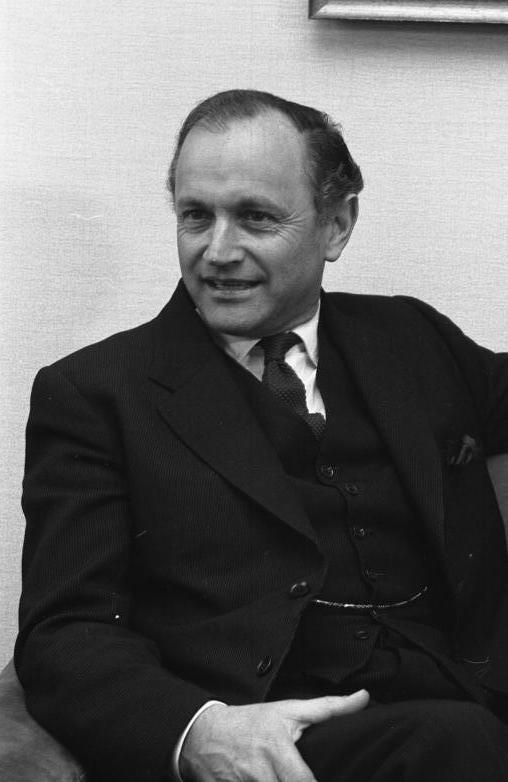
- Chalfont during a visit to West Germany in 1966

Minister of State for Foreign and Commonwealth Affairs
- In office 23 October 1964 – 19 June 1970
- Monarch: Elizabeth II
- Prime Minister: Harold Wilson
- Preceded by: Peter Thomas
- Succeeded by: Joseph Godber

Member of the House of Lords
- Lord Temporal
- Life peerage 11 November 1964 – 10 November 2015

Personal details
- Born: Alun Arthur Gwynne Jones; 5 December 1919 Monmouthshire, Wales
- Died: 10 January 2020 (aged 100)
- Party: Labour; Crossbencher
- Occupation: Politician; Lord Provest
- Military career
- Allegiance: United Kingdom
- Branch: British Army
- Service years: 1939–1961
- Rank: Lieutenant Colonel
- Service number: 156400
- Unit: South Wales Borderers
- Conflicts: Second World War; • Burma Campaign; Malayan Emergency
- Awards: Officer of the Order of the British Empire; Military Cross; Efficiency Medal

Alun Arthur Gwynne Jones, Baron Chalfont, OBE, MC, PC (5 December 1919 – 10 January 2020) was a British Army officer, politician and historian.

== Early life and military career ==
Gwynne Jones was born in modest circumstances in Monmouthshire. He was educated at West Monmouth School, and subsequently at the School of Slavonic Studies at the University of London. Joining the South Wales Borderers when the Second World War broke out, he was commissioned a second lieutenant on 2 November 1940. From 1941 to 1944 he fought in Burma alongside the Welsh poet Alun Lewis. On 1 January 1943, he received an emergency commission in the Royal Armoured Corps as a war-substantive lieutenant, with the same rank in the South Wales Borderers from 1 April. After the war, Gwynne Jones remained in the Army, receiving a substantive lieutenant's commission in the South Wales Borderers on 24 August 1946 (with seniority from 5 June 1942), and was promoted to captain on 5 December. He was awarded the Efficiency Medal in October 1950. Promoted to major on 5 December 1953, Gwynne Jones took part in a series of anti-terrorist campaigns, and was decorated with the Military Cross (MC) in August 1957 for commanding a company which fought in the Malaysian jungles during the Malayan Emergency, after his involvement in a series of ambushes against communist insurgents. Gwynne Jones later stated, "I was lucky enough to carry out some successful ones. The citation reads as follows:

For gallantry and relentless determination during a period of eighteen months in command of his company in jungle operations. By his personal share in difficult, hazardous and successful operations, he set a fine example to those around him.

Gwynne Jones was brevetted to lieutenant-colonel on 1 July 1960, and was decorated as an Officer of the Order of the British Empire (OBE) in the 1961 Birthday Honours. He retired from the army on 30 June 1961 with the honorary rank of lieutenant-colonel.

== Political life ==
Entering politics, he was a minister in the Foreign and Commonwealth Office from 1964 to 1970 and from 1964 was appointed to the Privy Council.

He was created Baron Chalfont, of Llantarnam in the County of Monmouthshire on 11 November 1964. Following the death of Lord Shawcross in 2003, his life peerage was the most senior extant, and Lord Chalfont was placed higher in the order of precedence than four hereditary barons whose inherited titles were created after his.

On 27 March 1967, in the House of Lords, Chalfont became the spokesman for Harold Wilson's Labour Party Government's attempt to divest Britain of the Falkland Islands. In November 1968 Chalfont travelled to the Falklands to canvass the people, and try to persuade them of the merit of becoming Argentine citizens. He was sent away in no doubt that the islanders wished to remain British, but, on his return to Britain, he reported, "I do not believe that the Falkland Islands can continue to exist for many years, as they are presently constituted. I believe one day that the Falkland Islands may be prepared to choose Argentine sovereignty. We must at all costs avoid giving the impression that we want to get rid of them, since that would set up precisely the reaction we would want to avoid."

Chalfont resigned from the Labour Party in the early 1970s. He declared his resignation a "decision of personal and political principle". In October 1974, just after Labour won a second general election that year, he stated in an interview with the BBC journalist Robin Day: "I had hoped for a realignment of the politics of the radical left in this country and I believed when I left the Labour Party that a great success by the Liberal Party in this election could have helped that forward". In 1979 Lord Chalfont was one of a group of ex-Labour politicians who defected to support the Conservatives and Margaret Thatcher at the general election. He contributed an article on The Strategic Defence Initiative to the Conservative Monday Club's October 1985 Conservative Party Conference issue of their newspaper, Right Ahead.

Chalfont was the author of several military history books on subjects including the Napoleonic Wars.

Chalfont was a former chairman of the Radio Authority which regulated commercial radio in the UK until its role was absorbed by Ofcom. He set up the Institute for the Study of Terrorism with Jillian Becker in 1985.

Lord Chalfont retired from the House of Lords on 10 November 2015.

== Personal life ==
In 1948 Gwynne Jones married Mona Mitchell (who died on 31 May 2008), the daughter of Harry Douglas Mitchell, and together they had one child, a daughter. He turned 100 on 5 December 2019 and died the following month, on 10 January 2020.

== Publications ==
- 1976: Montgomery of Alamein. London: Weidenfeld & Nicolson.
- 1979: Waterloo: Battle of Three Armies. Anglo-Dutch by William Seymour; French by Jacques Champagne; Prussian by E. Kaulbach; prologue & epilogue by Lord Chalfont; edited by Lord Chalfont. London: Sidgwick & Jackson. ISBN 978-0283987489.
- 1985: Star Wars: suicide or survival? London: Weidenfeld & Nicolson.
- 1987: Defence of the Realm. London: Collins.
- 1989: By God's Will: A Portrait of the Sultan of Brunei. London: Weidenfeld & Nicolson.
- 2000: The Shadow of my Hand. London: Weidenfeld & Nicolson (autobiography).

== Arms ==
Coat of arms of Alun Gwynne Jones, Baron Chalfont
Crest A dragon sejant Gules supporting a column Sable charged with nine bars Argent the capital also Argent. Escutcheon Gules a sword point downwards Proper pommel and hilt Or within an orle of two branches of olive fructed Gold. Supporters Dexter a private of the Grenadier Company 24th Foot (South Wales Borderers) in the uniform of circa 1751 supporting with the exterior hand a bamboo cane leaved Proper sinister a herald vested in a tabard of the arms Proper and holding in the exterior hand a sprig of olive fructed Or. Motto Cedant Arma Togae (May Weapons Yield To The Toga)

Honorary titles
Preceded by The Lord Shawcross	Senior life peer 2003–2020	Succeeded by The Baroness Masham of Ilton
