= Horst Söhnlein =

Horst Söhnlein (13 October 1942 – 23 March 2023) was a German activist convicted of arson in 1968, together with the future member of the Baader-Meinhof Group.

On 2 April 1968, along with Andreas Baader, Gudrun Ensslin and Thorwald Proll, he set fire to two department stores in Frankfurt as a protest against "the genocide in Vietnam". All four were arrested two days later.

All four of the defendants were convicted of arson and endangering human life and were sentenced to three years in prison. In June 1969 they were temporarily paroled under an amnesty for political prisoners, but in November of that year, the Federal Constitutional Court (Bundesverfassungsgericht) ordered that they return to custody. Unlike his three accomplices, who fled to Paris, Horst Söhnlein complied with the order.

== Sources ==
- Andreas Baader, Gudrun Ensslin, Thorwald Proll, Horst Söhnlein: Vor einer solchen Justiz verteidigen wir uns nicht. Schlußwort im Kaufhausbrandprozeß. Mit einem Nachwort von Bernward Vesper und einer Erklärung des SDS Berlin. Edition Voltaire, Frankfurt am Main und Berlin 1968. (Reihe: Voltaire Flugschrift 27)
- Erklärung der im Kaufhausbrandprozeß angeklagten Andreas Baader, Gudrun Ensslin, Horst Söhnlein und Thorwald Proll. in: Charlie Kaputt Nr.3, Dezember 1968, Berlin
- Stefan Aust: Der Baader-Meinhof-Komplex. Hamburg: Hoffmann und Campe, 1985, 591 S., ISBN 3-455-08253-X, Erw. und aktualisierte Ausgabe, 2005, 667 S, ISBN 3-455-09516-X
- Thorwald Proll, Daniel Dubbe: Wir kamen vom anderen Stern. Über 1968, Andreas Baader und ein Kaufhaus. Hamburg: Edition Nautilus 2003, 128 S., ISBN 3-89401-420-2
