= Gudrun Ensslin =

German far-left militant (1940–1977)

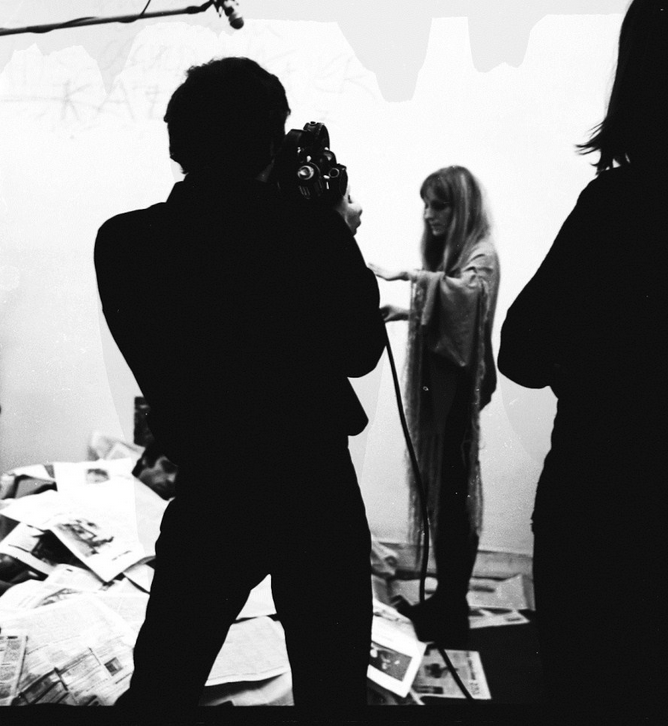
- Ensslin in a scene from Das Abonnement in 1967
- Born: 15 August 1940; Bartholomä, Germany
- Died: 18 October 1977 (aged 37); Stuttgart, West Germany
- Education: Free University of Berlin
- Organization: Red Army Faction
- Spouse: Bernward Vesper
- Children: Felix Ensslin

Gudrun Ensslin (German: [ˈɡuːdʁuːn ˈɛnsliːn]; 15 August 1940 – 18 October 1977) was a German far-left terrorist and founder of the West German far-left militant group Red Army Faction (Rote Armee Fraktion, or RAF, also known as the Baader-Meinhof Gang).

After becoming involved with co-founder Andreas Baader, Ensslin was influential in the development of his political beliefs. Ensslin was perhaps the intellectual head of the RAF. She was involved in five bomb attacks, with four deaths, was arrested in 1972 and died on 18 October 1977 in what has been called Stammheim Prison's "Death Night".

== Early life and education ==
Ensslin was the fourth of seven children, and grew up in Bad Cannstatt, Baden-Württemberg, Stuttgart, where her father Helmut Ensslin (de) was a pastor of the Evangelical Church.

Ensslin was a well-behaved child who did well at school and enjoyed working with the Protestant Girl Scouts, and doing parish work such as organizing Bible studies. In her family, the social injustices of the world were often discussed, and she is said to have been sensitized to social problems in West Germany and the world as a whole.

At the age of eighteen, Ensslin spent a year in the United States, where she attended high school in Warren, Pennsylvania. She graduated in the honors group at the high school in 1959. After returning home, she finished the remaining requirements for her secondary education.

Like her partner Bernward Vesper (de) and other members of the Red Army Faction, including Ulrike Meinhof and Horst Mahler, Ensslin had excellent exam scores and received a scholarship from the German National Academic Foundation. Studying at the University of Tübingen, she majored in education, English studies, and German studies. Ensslin also met Vesper in February 1962.

In Tübingen, together with two other students, Ensslin and Vesper organized a student workshop for new literature which led to a shoestring publishing business called Studio neue Literatur. The first book produced was an anthology of poems against atomic weapons, with prominent poets from all German-speaking countries as well as a bilingual edition of poems by Gerardo Diego.

In 1963 and 1964, Ensslin earned her elementary school teacher's diploma. In the summer of 1964, the couple moved to West Berlin where Ensslin began her thesis on Hans Henny Jahnn.

== Career ==
In 1965, Gudrun's younger sister Johanna married Günter Maschke, then a revolutionary Marxist poet and member of the Situationist International group Subversive Aktion, which included Rudi Dutschke as a member. Maschke became later in life a leading conservative antidemocratic intellectual and commentator of the work of Carl Schmitt. Later that year, Gudrun and Bernward were engaged to be married. Both were active in the democratic left-wing, they had well-paid jobs working for the Social Democratic Party of Germany. The couple demonstrated together against new security laws, the Vietnam War, an Allied Powers arms show, and for the right to demonstrate. Vesper neglected his studies, read voraciously, and in 1966 published, with a group of friends, a serious and important series of pamphlets and paperbacks, the Voltaire Flugschriften. In May 1967, Ensslin gave birth to their son Felix Ensslin (de).

In July or August 1967, Ensslin met Andreas Baader and they soon began a love affair. Baader had come to Berlin in 1963, to escape ongoing troubles with the Munich justice system and also to avoid conscription. Baader, who drifted in and out of youth detention centers and prison soon became the man of Ensslin's life. In February 1968, Ensslin broke up with Vesper by phone, informing him that the relationship was already finished before Felix was born. An artifact from this time is an experimental film Ensslin participated in entitled Das Abonnement (The Subscription).

=== Red Army Faction leader ===
In June 1967, Ensslin participated in political protests against the Shah of Iran during his visit to Germany. Though Western governments viewed the Shah as a reformer, his regime was also being criticized for oppression, brutality, corruption, and extravagance. In what started as a peaceful but unauthorised demonstration at Deutsche Oper Berlin, fights broke out between pro-Shah and anti-Shah demonstrators and an unarmed protestor named Benno Ohnesorg was fatally shot in the back of the head by a police officer, Karl-Heinz Kurras. On the night following Ohnesorg's death, Ensslin angrily denounced West Germany as a fascist police state at a Sozialistischer Deutscher Studentenbund meeting. Also, West Berlin's own urban guerrilla organization, Movement 2 June, named itself after this event.

Kurras was charged with manslaughter and acquitted on grounds of self-defense on 23 November 1967, which caused further public outrage. Matters eventually cooled, which enraged Baader and Ensslin. She had left Vesper and her child for good early in 1968 and now she, Baader and Thorwald Proll decided to escalate their fight against the system. They left West Berlin around 20 March, and in Munich decided to firebomb department stores in Frankfurt, where a Socialist German Student Union congress was taking place. Together with Horst Söhnlein, they left for Frankfurt on 1 April.

The night of 2 April 1968, a department store in Frankfurt was set ablaze, for which Baader, Ensslin, Proll and Söhnlein were subsequently arrested and prosecuted. In October 1968 they were sentenced to three years in prison for arson. After being released pending an appeal in June 1969, Baader, Ensslin and Proll fled Italy via France when the appeal was denied.

Baader was arrested on 4 April 1970 in Berlin. Ensslin, Meinhof (who was at that time a well-known leftist journalist) and two other women freed Baader on the 14 May 1970. One person was wounded. This was the beginning of the gang's violent actions, and the Red Army Faction. Ensslin became one of the most wanted people in Germany.

In May 1971, Vesper committed suicide in a mental hospital and Felix was sent to live with foster parents.

Ensslin was arrested in a boutique on 7 June 1972 in Hamburg, while shopping for a new sweater. When she left a coat with a revolver in its pocket outside a fitting room, a shop assistant noticed the weight in the coat, checked the pockets, found the gun and contacted the police.

== Death ==
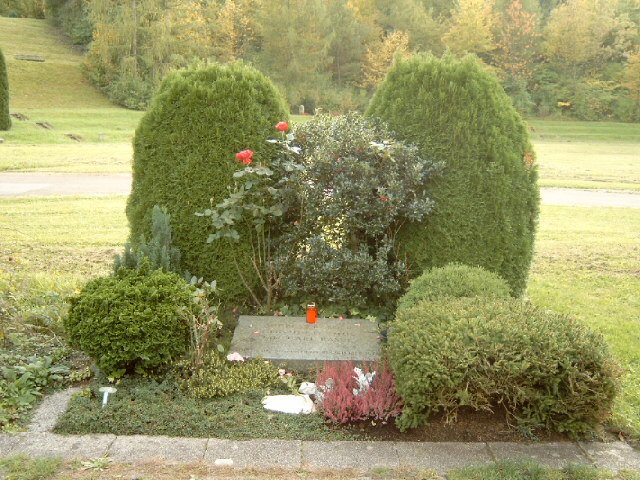
Burial site of Baader, Raspe, and Ensslin

The Red Army Faction's second generation made several attempts to free Ensslin and her comrades from prison. One attempt involved the kidnapping of Hanns-Martin Schleyer on 5 September 1977, and a proposed prisoner exchange. When this failed to work, the RAF orchestrated the hijacking of Lufthansa Flight 181 on 17 October. After the airplane was stormed by a German anti-terrorist unit, Schleyer was killed and put inside the trunk of a car in France.

Hours after the storming, in a night that became known as "Death Night of Stammheim", Ensslin, Baader, and Jan-Carl Raspe were found dead in the high security block of Stammheim Prison in Stuttgart. Like Meinhof, Ensslin was found dead by hanging in her cell. Baader and Raspe were found shot. A fourth member, Irmgard Möller, allegedly stabbed herself four times in the chest with a stolen knife. She recovered from her wounds and has since stated that the deaths were not suicides but extrajudicial killings undertaken by the government of the time, a claim strongly denied by the governments former and present. One exhaustive study of the RAF by Stefan Aust (revised in 2009 as "Baader-Meinhof: the inside story of the RAF") ultimately accepts the state's official ruling that the deaths were suicides, while highlighting serious shortcomings in the investigations.

On 27 October 1977, Ensslin was buried in a common grave with Baader and Raspe in the Dornhalden Cemetery in Stuttgart.

== In film ==
In 1981, Margarethe von Trotta's feature film Marianne and Juliane presented a fictionalised portrayal of an incarcerated Ensslin (Barbara Sukowa) and her sister (Jutta Lampe).

In 1986, Sabine Wegner played Ensslin in Reinhard Hauff's Stammheim, a detailed account of the trial against Ensslin, Baader, Meinhof and others.

Also in 1986, Corinna Kirchhoff played Ensslin in Markus Imhoof's The Journey (Die Reise), based on the memoirs of Ensslin's companion Bernward Vesper.

In 1997, Anya Hoffmann was Ensslin in Heinrich Breloer's award-winning TV docudrama Death Game.

In 2008, Ensslin was portrayed by Johanna Wokalek in Uli Edel's The Baader Meinhof Complex, an adaptation of the non-fiction book of the same name by Stefan Aust. Wokalek's performance in the film was rewarded with a nomination for the German Film Award 2009 and a Bambi award as best German actress. The film was chosen as Germany's submission to the 81st Academy Awards for Best Foreign Language Film, and was nominated for Best Foreign Language Film for the 66th Golden Globe Awards.

In February 2011, Andres Veiel's feature film If Not Us, Who?, in which Lena Lauzemis plays Gudrun Ensslin, won the Alfred Bauer Prize and the Prize of the German Art House Cinemas at the Berlin International Film Festival.

== In theatre ==
Ensslin appears as a character in Elfriede Jelinek's play Ulrike Maria Stuart.

Her writings feature in German avant-garde composer Helmut Lachenmann's opera Das Mädchen mit den Schwefelhölzern.

== See also ==
- German Autumn
- List of people who died by suicide by hanging
- Members of the Red Army Faction

== Bibliography ==
- Ellen Seiter, "The Political Is Personal: Margarethe von Trotta's Marianne And Juliane" Journal of Film and Video 37.2 (1985) : 41–46.
- Film: "Marianne and Juliane", with original German title "Die bleierne Zeit", directed by Margarethe von Trotta in 1981.
- Book: Hitler's Children by Jillian Becker.
- Book: Televisionaries (Televisionaries: the red army faction story 1963–1993) by Tom Vague.
- Book: "High School Graduates of Warren, Pennsylvania 1889–1995"
- Warren, PA: Warren Bicentennial History Committee, 1995. Oliphant, Nancy (editor)
- Denise Noe (2009). "The Baader Meinhof Gang". Turner Broadcasting System. Archived from the original on 1 June 2009.
