= Dietrich Burger =

German painter and graphic artist

Dietrich Burger (born 14 August 1935) is a German painter and graphic artist.

== Life ==
Born in Bad Frankenhausen, Burger studied at the Hochschule für Grafik und Buchkunst Leipzig under Bernhard Heisig from 1953 to 1958. From 1964, he taught there, from 1984 to 2000 as professor of painting and graphic arts.

== Reception ==
"In Dietrich Burger's paintings and graphic art, one encounters an unmistakably high proportion of identity between life and work. Thus, not only do things he has lived through and experienced take place in a more or less encoded form in his paintings, but the pictorial landscapes also deal with existential questions for him. The painter's gaze, always directed towards reality, and a seismographically inward-looking registration interweave in the painterly and graphic structure."

== Work ==
Burger stands for a constructivist variant of Saxon painting, with a high proportion of identity between life and work. His stations in life often determine individual forms of expression within his works. His early works are particularly influenced by classical French modernism, especially Corot, Watteau, Chardin, Picasso and Matisse.

== Honours ==
- 1988: Art Prize of the German Democratic Republic.

== Individual exhibitions ==
- 1978: Dietrich Burger: Malerei und Grafik, Lindenau-Museum.
- 1995: Malerei/Grafik/Zeichnungen, Galerie Kleindienst, Leipzig.
- 2000: Dietrich Burger: Malerei, Zeichnung, Druckgraphik, Lindenau-Museum.
- 2005: Neue Bilder, Galerie Kleindienst, Leipzig.
- 2008: Dietrich Burger: Gestern und Heute, Galerie am Domhof, Zwickau.
- 2010: bb, Galerie Kleindienst, Leipzig.

== Participation in exhibitions ==
- 1961: 6. Bezirkskunstausstellung, Leipzig
- 2007: Seit Leipzig, Kunsthalle Wittenhagen
- 2011: Hochdruck an der HGB Leipzig, Hochschule für Grafik und Buchkunst Leipzig.

== Works in museums and public collections ==
- Altenburg (Thüringen), Lindenau-Museum (many works, among others Spaziergänger; Tafelbild, Tempera, 1988?)
- Gera, Kunstsammlung Gera, Otto-Dix-Haus (among others I'm Garten / Die Kinder des Künstlers; Graphitzeichnung, 1976)
