= Thorwald Proll =

German writer (born 1941)

Thorwald Proll (born 22 July 1941) is a German writer and was active in the German student movement in the 1960s.

On 2 April 1968, along with Andreas Baader, Horst Söhnlein and Gudrun Ensslin, he set fire to two department stores in Frankfurt as a protest against the Vietnam War. All four were arrested two days later.

All four of the defendants were convicted of arson and endangering human life and were sentenced to three years in prison. In June 1969, they were temporarily paroled under an amnesty for political prisoners, but in November of that year, the Federal Constitutional Court (Bundesverfassungsgericht) ordered that they return to custody. Horst Söhnlein complied with the order; Proll and the others went underground and made their way to France, where they stayed for a time in a house owned by prominent French journalist and revolutionary, Régis Debray.

Thorwald Proll's sister, Astrid, was introduced to the group by him. She joined Baader, Ensslin and others in forming the Red Army Faction. However, Thorwald Proll turned away from the group and in December left Paris for England.

On 21 November 1970, he turned himself in to the public prosecutor's office in Berlin. In October 1971, he was released early from prison.

After the release from custody Proll worked as, amongst other things, as a waiter, salesman and a lecturer.

Since 1978, he has lived in Hamburg as a poet, author and a bookseller.
