= Hitler's Children: The Story of the Baader-Meinhof Terrorist Gang =

1977 book

- First edition
- Author: Jillian Becker
- Language: English
- Genre: Non-fiction
- Publisher: J. B. Lippincott & Co.
- Publication date: June 1977

Hitler's Children: The Story of the Baader-Meinhof Terrorist Gang is a 1977 book about the West German militant left-wing group, the Red Army Faction (also known as The Baader-Meinhof Gang), by the British author Jillian Becker.

The first edition was published in June 1977 by J. B. Lippincott & Co. It recounts the deeds of the group up to the suicides of Ulrike Meinhof and Andreas Baader. A second expanded edition was published in January 1978 as a Panther paperback by Granada, London, in which an additional chapter recorded additional terrorist attacks by a "new generation" of young German terrorists carried out in 1977. The revised text was translated into several European languages and Japanese. It was also serialized in leading daily newspapers in London, Tokyo and Oslo. A third edition was published by Pickwick Books, London, in 1989, with additional material.

The book chronicles the group and provides a brief biography of the main members, Andreas Baader and Gudrun Ensslin, and also describes Ulrike Meinhof's life leading up to her terrorist career. Elsewhere in the book the author refers to Ulrike Meinhof's "characteristic inefficiency" and fellow member Siegfried Hausner's persistent bungling as an urban guerilla.

== Critical reaction ==
The Boston Globe called this book "the definitive study of the Baader- Meinhof gang". In a review in The New York Times, Stephen Spender wrote that the book is "strong on facts and useful source material and is a good crime story" but criticized it as "turgidly written". Although critical of the book's title, Klaus Vondung called the book a "penetrating study of the Red Army Faction" in his book, The Apocalypse in Germany.
