= Johan van Minnen =

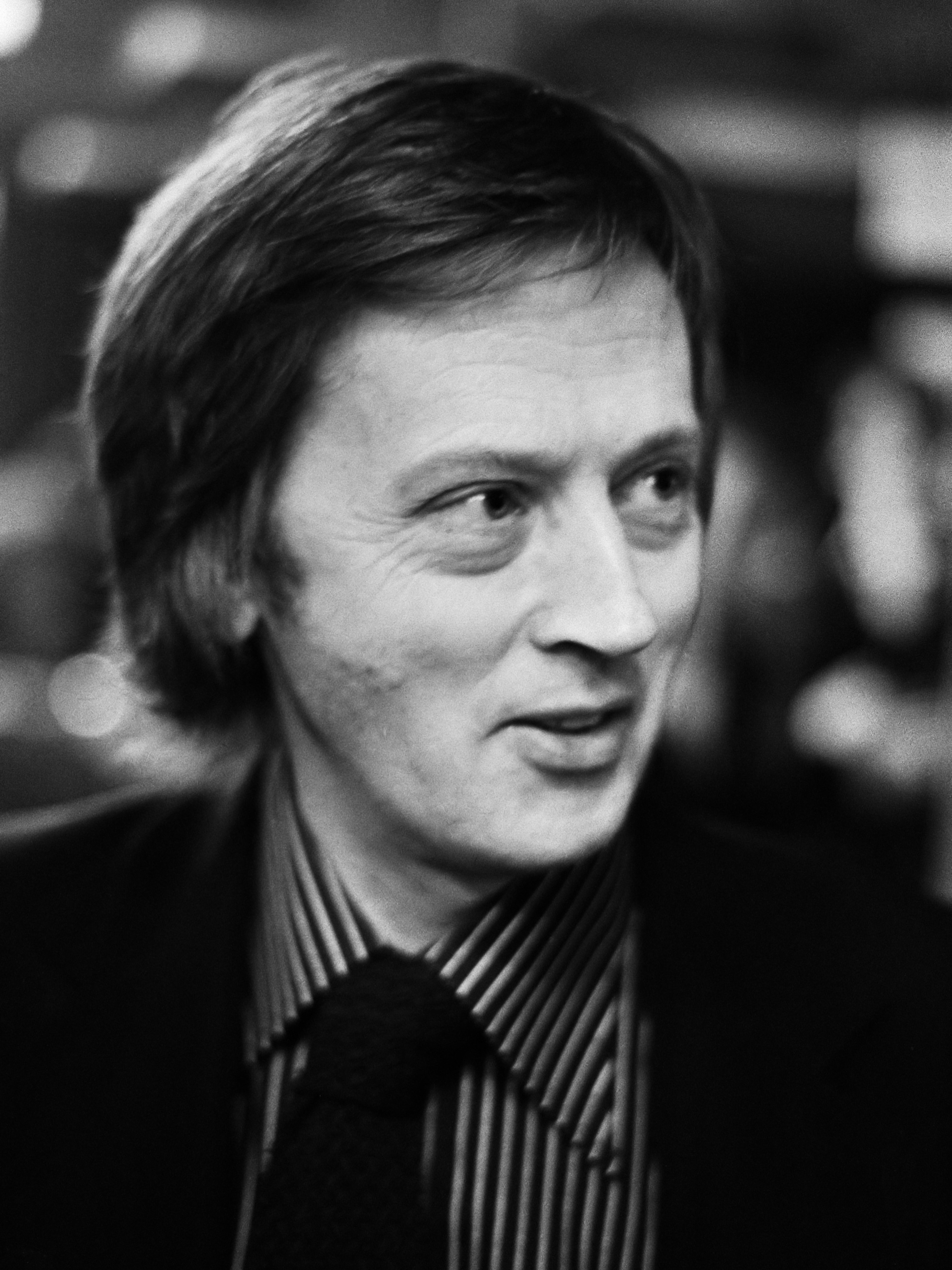
- Johan van Minnen in 1979, image of Nationaal Archief

Member of the European Parliament
- In office 17 July 1979 – 23 July 1984
- Constituency: Netherlands

Personal details
- Born: 31 October 1932 Noordwolde, Netherlands
- Died: 18 April 2016 (aged 83) Zeist, Netherlands
- Party: Labour Party

Johan Tjitze van Minnen (31 October 1932 – 18 April 2016) was a Dutch journalist and politician. He was a foreign correspondent in first Luxembourg and later West Germany. Between 1975 and 1978 he was the ombudsman of the television show De Ombudsman. Van Minnen served as a member of the European Parliament for the Labour Party between 1979 and 1984.

== Career ==
Van Minnen was born on 31 October 1932 in Noordwolde. He was a contributing editor for Het Vrije Volk from 1952 to 1958. Van Minnen then moved to Luxembourg, where he was a foreign correspondent for the Nieuwe Rotterdamsche Courant until 1964. He then switched countries and was stationed in Bonn, then capital of West Germany. Van Minnen worked there as foreign correspondent for the Dutch public broadcaster. In 1975 he returned to the Netherlands and was the ombudsman on the television show De Ombudsman until 1978. Van Minnen subsequently served as a member of the European Parliament for the Labour Party between 17 July 1979 and 23 July 1984. Throughout his time in Parliament he served on the Committee on Social Affairs and Employment. Van Minnen wrote several book on the position of Germany in Europe.

He died on 18 April 2016 in Zeist.
