= Margrit Schiller =

German far-left activist (born 1948)

- Born: March 1948 (age 77); Bonn, Germany
- Organization(s): Socialist Patients' Collective, Red Army Faction

Margrit Schiller (born March 1948) is a German far-left activist formerly associated with the Socialist Patients' Collective (SPK) and then the Red Army Faction (RAF). She was released from prison in 1979 and has written two autobiographical books.

== Early life ==
Schiller was born in 1948. She joined the Socialist Patients' Collective (SPK) and after it dissolved, she became a member of the Red Army Faction (RAF).

== Militant leftist career ==
On 25 September 1971, two policemen approached a wrongly parked vehicle near to the Freiburg-Basel autobahn. Schiller and Holger Meins emerged and started firing guns at them. A month later Schiller left a train station in Hamburg around 10pm and realised she was being trailed by police. She met her RAF comrades Ulrike Meinhof and Gerhard Müller, then a shootout occurred, with one of the policemen being shot dead. Schiller was arrested and later claimed that it was Müller that was responsible for the murder. She was re-arrested alongside other RAF members Kay Werner-Allnach and Wolfgang Beer on 4 February 1974 after police carried out raids in Hamburg and Frankfurt. She received a five year sentence and was released from prison in 1979. Whilst in prison Schiller took part in the RAF hunger strikes.

== Later life ==
Schiller moved to Cuba in 1985 and then Uruguay in 1993. She described her experiences abroad in the 2011 memoir So siehst du gar nicht aus!.

== Selected works ==
- Schiller, Margrit; Munro, Lindsay (2008). Remembering the armed struggle: Life in Baader-Meinhof. London: Zidane. ISBN 978-0955485046.
- Schiller, Margrit (2011). So siehst du gar nicht aus! Eine autobiografische Erzählung über Exil in Kuba und Uruguay. Berlin: Assoziation A. ISBN 978-3-86241-408-6.
