= Norbert Kröcher =

West German terrorist and member of J2M (1950–2016)

- Born: Norbert Erich Kröcher; 14 July 1950; West Berlin
- Died: 16 September 2016 (aged 66); Berlin, Germany
- Organization: Movement 2 June
- Spouse: Gabriele Kröcher-Tiedemann

Norbert Erich Kröcher (14 July 1950 – 16 September 2016) was a German terrorist and member of J2M. He was also strongly associated with the second generation of the Red Army Faction. He was the husband of Gabriele Kröcher-Tiedemann.

== As a terrorist ==
In 1976 Kröcher planned to kidnap the Swedish politician Anna-Greta Leijon. The goal was to exchange Leijon for eight of his comrades held in German prisons. The plan, known as Operation Leo, was intercepted by the police and Kröcher was arrested on 31 March in Stockholm. He was deported from Sweden in 1977 and jailed in Germany. He was released in 1985 and did not rejoin the J2M. As of 2005, he was known to live in Berlin. He committed suicide on 16 September 2016 after being diagnosed with terminal cancer.
