= Jillian Becker =

British writer (born 1932)

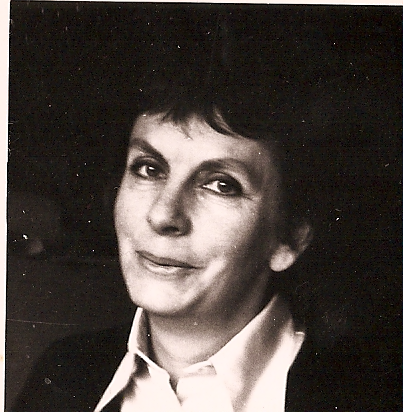
- Portrait of Becker, 1972
- Born: 2 June 1932 (age 94); Johannesburg, Union of South Africa
- Citizenship: British; American
- Education: University of the Witwatersrand (BA)
- Writing career
- Notable work: Hitler's Children
- Notable awards: Pushcart Prize
- Website: theatheistconservative.com

Jillian Becker (born 2 June 1932) is a South African-born British author, journalist, and lecturer, who specialises in research about terrorism. Her work includes Hitler's Children: The Story of the Baader-Meinhof Terrorist Gang (1977).

== Early life and move to London ==
Becker's father was Bernard Friedman, a South African surgeon and politician who co-founded the anti-apartheid Progressive Party. Becker attended Roedean School in Johannesburg before graduating from the University of the Witwatersrand.

Becker left her first husband, Michael Geber, in South Africa to live in Italy with her second husband, Gerry Becker, before moving to London in 1960, living at Mountfort Crescent, near Barnsbury Square in London. It was here that Becker's friend, Sylvia Plath, came to stay with her young children in the days immediately before Plath's suicide. Becker's book Giving Up is based around Plath's last days there.

== Career and political advocacy ==
Becker's best-known book, Hitler's Children: The Story of the Baader-Meinhof Terrorist Gang, is about the German Red Army Faction. The book was chosen by Golo Mann as Newsweek (Europe) book of the year 1977, and serialised in newspapers in London, Oslo and Tokyo.

The PLO: The Rise and Fall of the Palestine Liberation Organization was commissioned by Weidenfeld & Nicolson and published in 1984. Becker spent months in Lebanon during the Lebanese Civil War, which Israel entered to confront the Palestine Liberation Organization (PLO). She claimed to have retrieved secret documents from the ruins of bombed PLO office buildings and to have interviewed Lebanese of all denominations and Palestinians who had experienced PLO oppression, as well as supporters, members and leaders of the PLO. The book was heavily criticized by the Journal of Palestine Studies as "facile and tendentious," as well as the lack of any PLO members being interviewed.

In the 1980s, Becker served in a multi-party working group to advise the British Parliament on measures to combat international terrorism. She was also consulted by the embassies of several countries affected by domestic terrorist organisations, some of which were supported by foreign nation states. In many of these cases, terrorist activity was an aspect of proxy wars, which Becker called "the hot spots of the Cold War". In 1985, with Lord Chalfont, a former minister in the Foreign and Commonwealth Office, Becker founded the Institute for the Study of Terrorism (IST), becoming its executive director from 1985 to 1990.

Becker is on the council of The Freedom Association, and is the manager and editor of The Atheist Conservative blog. She lives in California.

== Books ==
=== Selected fiction ===
- Becker, Jillian (1971). The Keep. Harmondsworth: Penguin Books. ISBN 978-0-14-003204-8.
- Becker, Jillian (1971). The Union. London: Chatto and Windus. ISBN 0-7011-1625-0.
- Becker, Jillian (1986). The Virgins: A Novel. Cape Town: David Philip. ISBN 978-0-86486-050-7.

=== Non-fiction ===
- Becker, Jillian (1977). Hitler's Children: The Story of the Baader-Meinhof Terrorist Gang. Philadelphia: J.B. Lippincott. ISBN 978-0-397-01153-7.
- Becker, Jillian (1984). The PLO: The Rise and Fall of the Palestine Liberation Organization. London: Weidenfeld and Nicolson. ISBN 0-297-78299-1.
- Becker, Jillian (2002). Giving up: The Last Days of Sylvia Plath. London: Ferrington. ISBN 978-1898490319.
