= Butz Peters =

German television presenter and jurist

- Born: 22 January 1958 (age 68); Hanover, West Germany
- Occupations: Jurist, Journalist, Television presenter
- Known for: presenting the ZDF television program Aktenzeichen XY… ungelöst from 1997 to 2001

Butz Peters (born 22 January 1958) is a German television presenter and jurist who presented Aktenzeichen XY... ungelöst from 1997 to 2001. He is the author of four bestsellers (among others Tödlicher Irrtum – Die Geschichte der RAF, Fatal error – The History of the RAF), which mainly deal with the theme of left wing terrorism in post war Germany. From 1994 till 1996, he worked as screenwriter for the ARD gossip magazine Brisant, in 1993/1994, he was editor in chief of the radio station Antenne Sachsen.

== Works ==
- The last myth of the RAF: Who shot Wolfgang Grams? The disaster of Bad Kleinen (Der letzte Mythos der RAF: Wer erschoss Wolfgang Grams? Das Desaster von Bad Kleinen), Berlin 2006, ISBN 3-550-07865-X.
- Fatal error. The history of the RAF (Tödlicher Irrtum. Die Geschichte der RAF), Berlin 2004, ISBN 3-87024-673-1.
- Television and film production. Legal Guide (Fernseh- und Filmproduktion. Rechtshandbuch), Baden-Baden 2003, ISBN 3-7890-8138-8
- Who's who in German law. Guide to the legal world (Who’s who im deutschen Recht. Wegweiser durch die Juristenwelt), München 2003, ISBN 3-406-50184-2
- Media Law. The civil rights (Medienrecht. Die zivilrechtlichen Ansprüche), München 1999, ISBN 3-406-44853-4
- The gravy train. Organised crime in the Federal Republic (Die Absahner. Organisierte Kriminalität in der Bundesrepublik), Hamburg 1994, ISBN 3-498-05273-X
- Handbook of the law on working time: The new Working Hours Act 1994 (Handbuch des Arbeitszeitrechts: Das neue Arbeitszeitgesetz 1994), Hannover 1994, ISBN 3-7813-4507-6
- RAF. Terrorism in Germany (RAF. Terrorismus in Deutschland), Stuttgart 1991, ISBN 3-421-06619-1.
- The partnership mediation agreement (Der Partnerschaftsvermittlungsvertrag), Frankfurt am Main 1986, ISBN 3-8204-9356-5
