= Stammheim Prison =

Maximum-security state prison in Stuttgart, Baden Württemberg, Germany

Stuttgart Correctional Facility Justizvollzugsanstalt Stuttgart
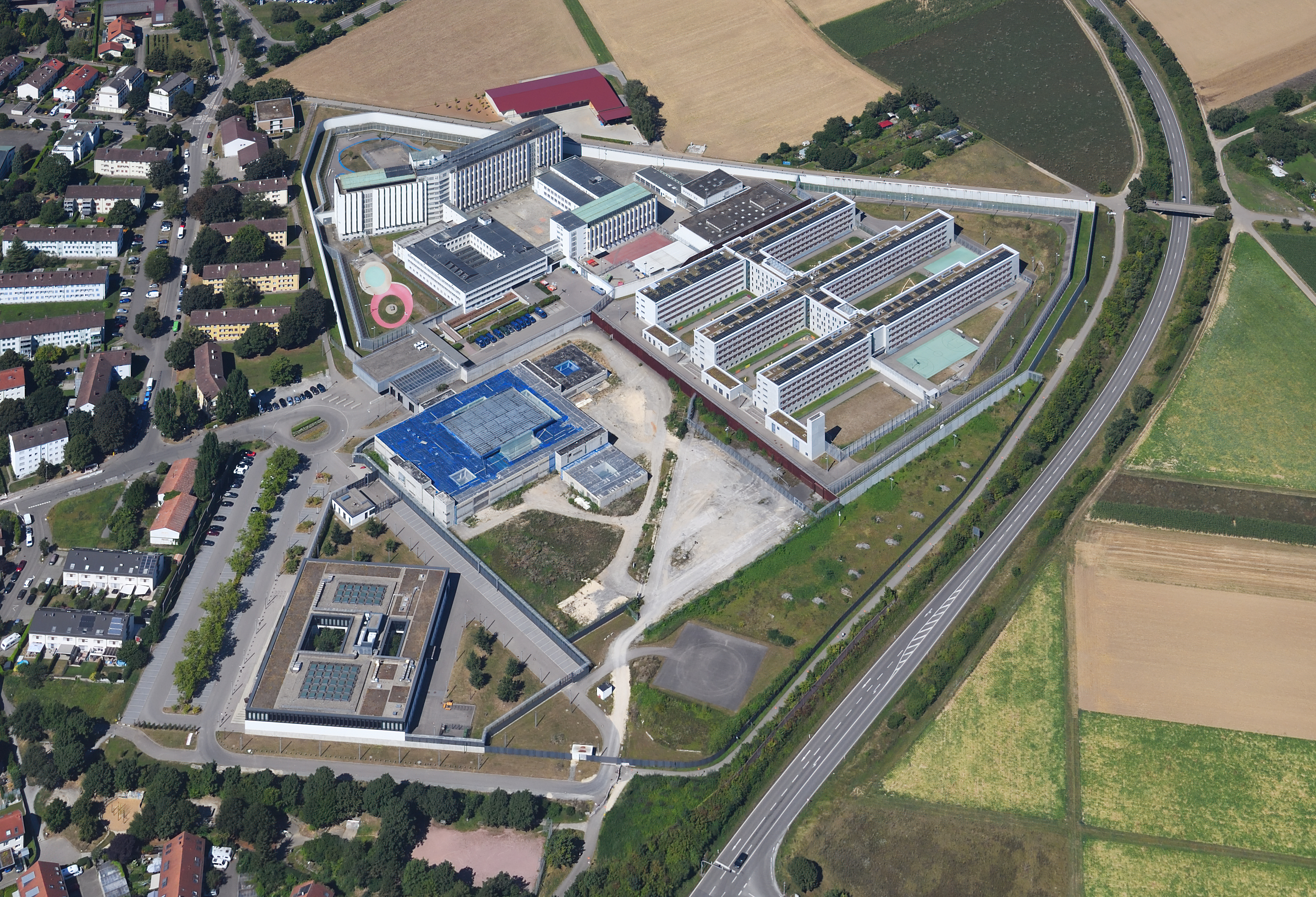
- Aerial view of Stuttgart Prison in 2024

- Location in Baden-Württemberg Stammheim Prison (Germany)
- Interactive map of Stuttgart Correctional Facility; Justizvollzugsanstalt Stuttgart
- Location: Stuttgart-Stammhiem, Baden-Württemberg; 48°51′17″N 9°9′18″E
- Status: Operational
- Security class: maximum to supermax
- Population: average of 768 from 68 nations (October 2018)
- Opened: September 1963
- Managed by: Ministry of Justice Baden-Württemberg (Justizministerium Baden-Württemberg)
- Director: Institution Manager: Matthias Nagel; Representative: Bianca Schäffner; Administrative Manager: Jürgen Goll
- Website: Justizvollzugsanstalt Stuttgart

Notable prisoners
- Andreas Baader, Ulrike Meinhof, Gudrun Ensslin, Jan-Carl Raspe, Irmgard Möller

Stuttgart Correctional Facility (German: Justizvollzugsanstalt Stuttgart, JVA Stuttgart), also known as Stuttgart Prison or Stammheim Prison, is located in the Stuttgart district of Stammheim, the northernmost district of the state capital of Baden-Württemberg, Germany. It is the largest of a total of 17 correctional facilities with 19 branches in the Baden-Württemberg state prison system. Stammheim Prison gained national media attention in the 1970s due to the trials against the Red Army Faction and the imprisonment of its leading members in the high-security wing. Designed as a maximum to supermax security facility, the prison was put into operation in September 1963 after four years of construction. Today, it covers an area of approximately 50,000 square metres (540,000 sq ft).

== History ==
The Stuttgart-Stammheim correctional facility was designed to be a modern, cost-effective, and, above all, a secure remand prison. At the time, the press praised Stuttgart-Stammheim Prison for its "bright and functionally furnished" cells, the efficiency, and especially the security of the prison, which featured meter-high walls, barbed wire, cameras, motion detectors, and a state-of-the-art locking system. Although Stammheim was initially planned as a remand prison, its reputation as the secure institution in the southwest led to the transfer of more and more problem prisoners there.

== Red Army Faction prisoners 1974–77 ==
In 1974, the prison became known to the general public primarily through the imprisonment of leading members of the terrorist organization, the Red Army Faction (RAF). In 1975, a new multi-purpose building was constructed next to the prison grounds specifically for the trials of the leading RAF members—a fortress against terror. To prevent any rescue attempts by helicopter, this hall and the yard were covered with large areas of steel netting. The construction costs for the extension amounted to 12 million German Mark.

Up to five RAF members were housed together in a collective on the seventh-floor converted "high-security wing" of the prison. Leading RAF members Andreas Baader, Ulrike Meinhof, Jan-Carl Raspe, and Gudrun Ensslin were kept there until their trial, along with Irmgard Möller from January 1977. Contrary to usual prison regulations, both RAF women and men prisoners were housed on the same floor but in separate cells. During their "free hour," the RAF prisoners had the opportunity to use the common prison yard together every day. They were also allowed to use record players, radios, and, at times, televisions, and were given hundreds of magazines and books. Despite these relatively easier prison conditions, they managed, among other things through a hunger strike, to create the public impression that they were being isolated and tortured in Stammheim. They portrayed themselves as victims of the justice system and achieved a broad wave of solidarity. RAF sympathizers demonstrated against solitary confinement torture and force-feeding. Instead of allowing independent reporting on prison conditions, the justice system continued to isolate the RAF terrorists, thereby promoting the idea that solitary confinement torture occurred.

=== Faction member trials (1975–77) ===
During the trials, Ulrike Meinhof was found dead in her seventh-floor prison cell, having committed suicide by hanging on 9 May 1976. It is not clear what happened. Prison officials say she killed herself because she was becoming increasingly isolated in the group. RAF lawyers and RAF supporters spoke of murder. In the aftermath, it was claimed prison censors allowed parcels containing instructions for the surviving RAF prisoners to follow suit, complete with ropes "sufficient to do the job". During the terrorist attacks of the German Autumn in 1977, an official contact ban was imposed for several weeks, made possible by the specially enacted "Contact Ban Law" (Kontaktsperregesetz). During this phase, the RAF prisoners were isolated. Subsequently, prisoners and lawyers claimed that isolation torture was being practiced in the prison. The prison administration also tried to prevent communication between the prisoners—without success, as it turns out. By manipulating the prison's electrical lines, the prisoners on the seventh floor could still communicate with each other. Later, it became known that Jan-Carl Raspe had manipulated the intercom system using the former prison radio network, allowing the prisoners to communicate unnoticed during the contact ban.

=== Night of death in Stammheim ===
During the trials, members of the Red Army Faction smuggled three pistols and over a pound of explosives into Stuttgart-Stammheim Prison. One of the pistols was concealed in a Christian liturgy guidebook. This guidebook was later displayed in an exhibition in Stuttgart about the RAF. According to a subsequent independent commission's investigation, the items were hidden among case files and brought to the seventh-floor cells by the prisoners via their lawyers. The security breach occurred in the trial building, where the weapons were handed over.

It is considered certain that on 18 October 1977, at around 0:40 Central European Time (CET), Raspe heard on Deutschlandfunk about the successful rescue of the hostages from the hijacked Lufthansa Landshut airliner and passed this on to the other prisoners via the intercom. On the same night, Andreas Baader, Gudrun Ensslin, and Jan-Carl Raspe reportedly committed suicide in the high-security wing, an event that became known as the "Night of Death in Stammheim" for the leaders of the Red Army Faction. Baader and Raspe were said to have shot themselves, while Ensslin chose a method of supposed suicide similar to that of Meinhof. A fourth member, Irmgard Möller, allegedly stabbed herself multiple times in the chest with a stolen cutlery knife. She survived her suicide attempt and has since stated that the deaths were not suicides, but rather extrajudicial killings carried out by the West German government of the time, a claim strongly denied by both former and present German governments.

The deaths of the prisoners were among the events collectively known as the German Autumn, which also included a series of terrorist attacks and the West German government's response.

== Restructuring and extension (2005–17) ==
Officials in Baden-Württemberg announced in August 2007 plans to tear down the section of Stammheim prison where the leaders of the RAF terrorist group were held during the 1970s. They considered demolishing the high-rise building because it needed renovation, and new prison quarters would be built on the site of the demolished building. These plans were adjusted in the following years. Five additional buildings were built between 2007 and 2017, connected to a tract built in 2005. Together, the extensions can house up to 559 prisoners. The two original buildings were renovated from 2019 onwards to provide capacity for a total of 822 inmates in Stammheim prison.

== Gallery ==
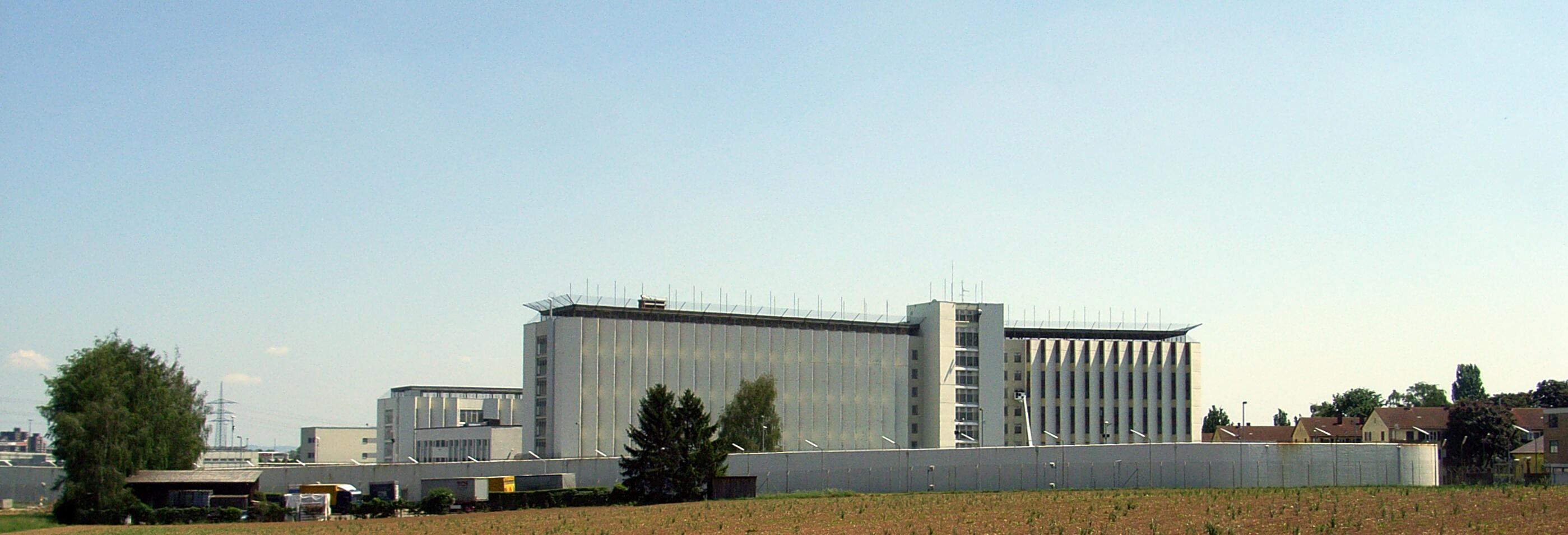
East view of Stuttgart Prison, Stuttgart-Stammheim, Baden-Württemberg, 2007

== See also ==
Prisons in Germany
