= Bettina Röhl =

German journalist and author (born 1962)

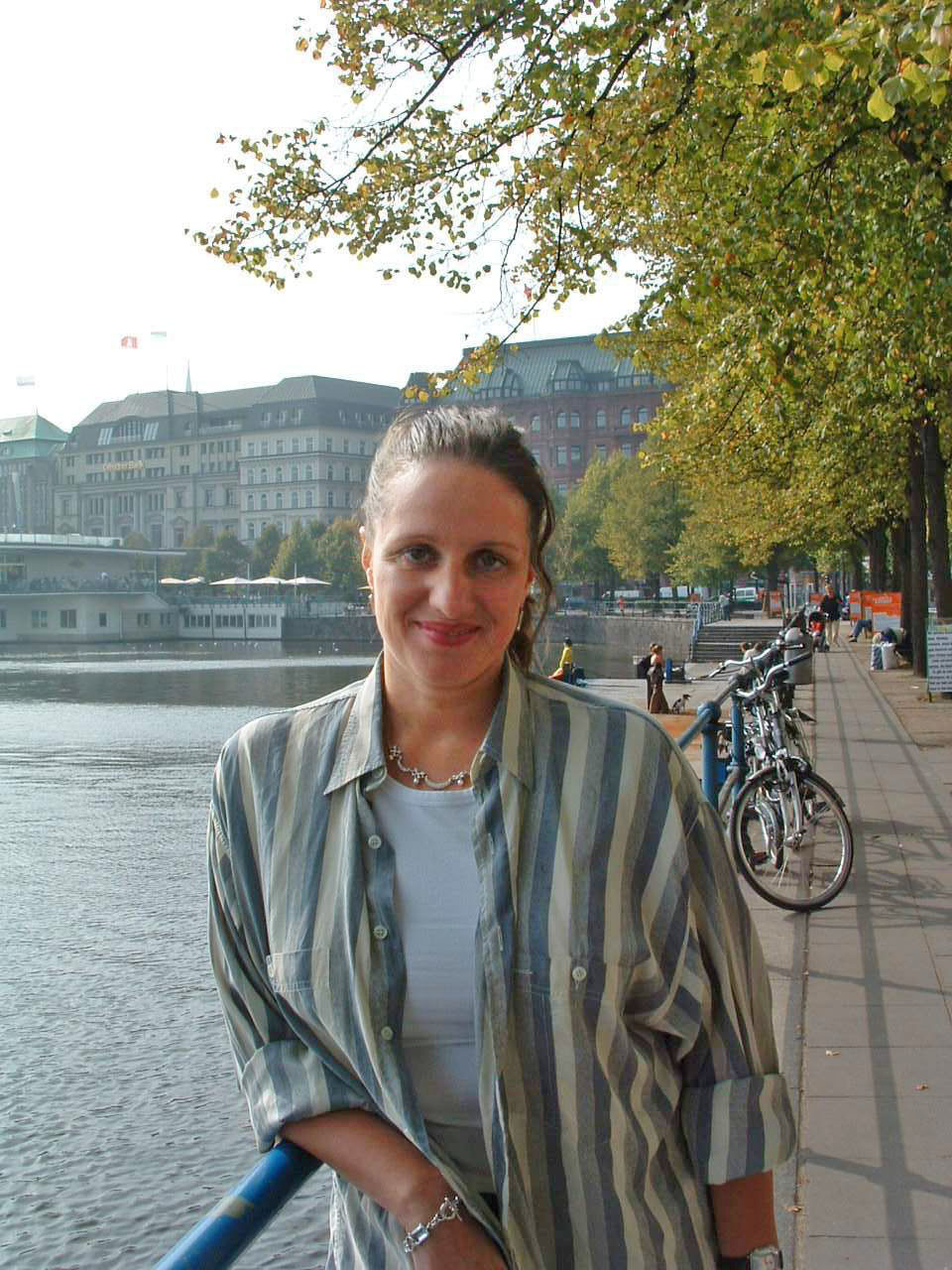
Röhl in Hamburg, 2005

Bettina Röhl (born 21 September 1962) is a German journalist and author. She is best known for her writings about student radicalism of the 1960s and the terrorist kidnappings that it spawned in West Germany during the early 1970s. Röhl has written extensively about the former Foreign Minister Joschka Fischer's time as a left-wing militant leader. She has also researched and written at length about her own mother, journalist and Red Army Faction terrorist Ulrike Meinhof. Her assessments of the violence associated with the Red Army Faction in the 1970s are at times intensely critical.

== Life ==
=== Family provenance and childhood ===
Bettina Röhl and her twin sister Regine were born in Hamburg. Ulrike Meinhof (1934–1976), their mother, was at this time supporting herself as a columnist, and according to at least one source as editor-in-chief by 1962, with konkret, an uncompromisingly left-wing political magazine of the time. Their father is remembered as the magazine's founder and was at that time its publisher, Klaus Rainer Röhl. Bettina Röhl spent her early childhood in Hamburg, till February 1968 when her parents divorced: Regine and Bettina then accompanied their mother to Berlin. That same year the girls were enrolled at the Königin-Luise-Stiftung ("Queen Luise Foundation") School, an evangelical (Protestant) private educational establishment in Berlin-Dahlem.

In May 1970, after the violent liberation of Andreas Baader from a rehabilitation programme he was attending as preparation for his release from jail, Ulrike Meinhof, who had played a central part in the "operation", was obliged to "disappear underground". She had not fired the "fatal shot", but of those sought by the police in connection with the affair it was Ulrike Meinhof rather than her male comrades who most caught the imagination of the press reporters: her picture was widely circulated. The twins had been sent to Bremen to spend the two week spring holiday with Meinhof's friend, the writer Jürgen Holtkamp, and were totally unaware of the Baader jail break. As soon as Meinhof's face began to appear on "wanted" posters the girls' father applied to a court for custody of them, but the divorce and its aftermath had been bitter: Ulrike was determined that Regine and Bettina should be kept away from their father.

By 3 August 1970, when the court agreed that the girls could stay with their father, they had already been abroad for six weeks. Directly after Meinhof's disappearance one of her politically like-minded friends, Monika Berberich, collected Regine and Bettina from Berlin Zoo, a meeting point prearranged with another comrade who had collected the girls from their two-week break in Bremen. Berberich then drove with the children through France and Italy to a "barracks camp" on the side of Mount Etna which had originally been constructed as emergency accommodation for people made homeless by a volcanic eruption, and where now Andreas Baader and other comrades were hiding. The girls were told that they would be reunited with their mother in Sicily: they were not aware, at the time, that they had been taken there in order to avoid their being found by their father. In September 1970, the children were found by Stefan Aust, then a young investigative journalist from Hamburg, and returned to West Germany in time to spend their eighth birthday with their father.

More recently Röhl herself has asserted with increasing conviction, in several interviews, that Meinhof would have had absolutely no reason to keep the girls away from their father at this time: there are hints that taking them to Sicily may have been part of a longer-term plan to escape with them to the relative safety (for a wanted terrorist suspect and her children) of a "Palestinian camp in Jordan". Röhl has also hinted strongly that the backwash from the bitterness of divorce had left her mother mentally damaged.

=== School and university years ===
Between 1970 and 1982, Regine and Bettina Röhl lived with their father in Hamburg where they had a relatively conventional upbringing, though not unmarked by the fate of their mother who was arrested in 1972 and spent the final four years of her life in prison awaiting the conclusion of a complex series of well publicised trials. In May 1976, Ulrike Meinhof's body was found hanged in her Stuttgart prison cell. At school, when asked about her parents, Röhl was able to respond with a well rehearsed one-line explanation designed to conclude the discussion: "My mother's dead, and my father was the editor-in-chief of the left-wing magazine konkret." In 1982, she graduated successfully from the prestigious Gymnasium Christianeum (secondary school) in Hamburg, and moved on to the University of Hamburg where she studied history and Germanistics. Her university years also included a period studying Italian in Perugia.

=== Journalism ===
There never seems to have been any question of Röhl following her mother politically. Nevertheless, she did so professionally, embarking on a career in journalism while still at university. Publications for which she has worked include the lifestyle magazines Tempo and Männer Vogue, along with the political monthly Cicero. She has also contributed to the mass-circulation daily newspaper Hamburger Abendblatt and the television magazine Spiegel TV, and has contributed to numerous books.

== Themes ==
During the first part of the 21st century, Röhl has used her journalistic experience to concentrate more intensively on a relatively small number of themes: sometimes she has stirred controversy, drawing attention to uncomfortable aspects of recent history.

=== Joschka Fischer ===
In January 2001, Röhl triggered discussion about the suitability for office of the Foreign Minister and Vice-Chancellor Joschka Fischer, when she published some photographs which recalled Fischer's younger years. The pictures appeared to show Fischer with Hans-Joachim Klein and other political activists savagely assaulting Rainer Marx, a policeman, during a street fight on 7 April 1973. Röhl published them on her website and in Stern. The pictures came from a series produced by a photographer called Lutz Kleinhans in 1973 for the Frankfurter Allgemeine Zeitung, but no one had identified Fischer and Klein in them till 2000 when Röhl undertook the necessary research and spotted the men. Shortly afterwards, Röhl unearthed a film sequence of the same assault in television archives of the Tagesschau, showing Fischer and the point at which the policeman was knocked to the ground.

After Fischer had given public confirmation that during the 1970s he had indeed engaged in "violent actions" against policemen, Röhl addressed an open letter to President Rau giving notice of a criminal action against Fischer for attempted murder. This was based on witness statements, including three that she had on tape, which she had obtained while researching an incident in 1976 involving a life-threatening attack with a Molotov cocktail on a Frankfurt policeman called Jürgen Weber. Röhl wrote: "It's about the person Josef Martin Fischer. It's about his past. And its about the current… Fischer network. It's about the media cartel that suppresses truth. It's about a national emergency". Röhl's approach provoked a backlash. The photographer from whom she had received the pictures obtained (belatedly) a court injunction against her because she had published his pictures without his agreement. Her use of film footage borrowed from the television company and the high prices she had herself demanded for the recordings attracted media criticism. During 2001 and 2002, she twice made substantial contributions to the political television magazine programme Panorama which covered Fischer's violent past and her research work on it.

Criticism of Röhl's approach increasingly became the story in both the domestic and international press. Her biography and the biographies of her well known parents were revisited in a search for her own motivation. A few days after she launched her journalism based campaign against Fischer, the Cologne publishers Kiepenheuer & Witsch cancelled their contract to publish her biography of Fischer, "Sag mir, wo du stehst". Joschka Fischer is a writer too. The publishers' stated reasoning was that Röhl's sustained campaign, using all possible means both serious and questionable, against their longstanding author Joschka Fischer, had prompted the termination of their publishing contract with Röhl. Röhl became convinced that she had been made the target of a media hate campaign designed to launder Joschka Fischer's reputation by undermining her own credibility. During the summer, with Fischer on several occasions coming top in polls designed to identify the nation's most popular individual politician, it did indeed appear that his reputation had not been damaged by Röhl's revelations.

=== Mother:daughter ===
The death of Ulrike Meinhof in 1976 in a prison cell raised questions in Germany which never entirely went away, and in late 2002, Röhl disclosed that her mother's brain had never been buried, but had instead been extracted during autopsy, examined, and stored in a jar of formaldehyde preservative by doctors keen, it was explained, to explore a theory that Meinhof's mind had been damaged as a side-effect of an operation to remove a benign brain tumour in 1962. After reunification, Professor Jürgen Pfeiffer, the man at the centre of the work, had relocated to Magdeburg, and the brain had been transferred from the Tübingen Institute, where it had hitherto been stored, to Magdeburg in 1997. It had more recently been re-examined at a clinic in Magdeburg: Röhl had found out about the matter in October 2002. Almost immediately an ethics commission now prohibited the professors from undertaking further research on Meinhof's brain or from publishing any findings from research already undertaken. The prosecutors' office in Stuttgart then demanded that the professors return the brain, had it cremated and handed over the residuum to relatives of the deceased. On 22 December 2002, the remains of Ulrike Meinhof's brain were buried with her other mortal remains at the Dreifaltigkeitskirchhof III (cemetery) (Feld 3A-12-19) at Berlin-Mariendorf.

Later, Röhl wrote a piece about the hairdresser Udo Walz which appeared in the Rheinische Post, Die Welt and Berliner Morgenpost. Walz was the man who had dyed Ulrike Meinhof's hair blonde in 1970 when Meinhoff was "living underground". The article was accompanied by hitherto unpublished photo-portrait of Meinhoff as a blonde. Photographs of Meinhoff still sold newspapers. However, the Frankfurter Allgemeine Zeitung took the opportunity to criticise the continuing reporting of the "68 Generation" as a revenue raising device for (rival) newspapers. The FAZ's criticism included a description of Röhl as a "terrorist's daughter". Röhl launched and won a case in the Munich District Court against this characterisation. However, the judgement was overturned by the Federal High Court in Karlsruhe which applied a semantically careful judgement to the effect that the defamation alleged was casual rather than central to the article in which it was published by the FAZ. Röhl herself had written extensively about Ulrike Meinhof and let it be known that she was Meinhof's daughter, so that for anyone interested the information published by the Frankfurt newspaper would not be new information. Costs of the appeal were to be borne by Röhl.

=== RAF exhibition and "Ulrike Maria Stuart" ===
During the two-year run-up to an exhibition on the RAF held in 2005 in Berlin under the title "Zur Vorstellung des Terrors: Die RAF-Ausstellung", Röhl participated actively in the media discussions, notably with eye catching articles in Die Welt, Der Tagesspiegel, the Rheinische Post and Die Zeit. She also contributed to various television discussions and interviews on the display which was organised by Klaus Biesenbach, Ellen Blumenstein and Felix Ensslin. The exhibition was intended to explore ways in which the visual arts had dealt with the RAF.

After that there was a very public altercation with the Thalia Theater in Hamburg in connection with the international premier of Elfriede Jelinek's stage farce "Ulrike Maria Stuart". Nicolas Stemann's production – though heavily distorted and stylized – referenced personal details of the Röhl and Meinhof families which Bettina Röhl found injurious to her human rights. She demanded alterations to the script and threatened to obtain a court injunction against performance of the show. After the theatre had struck out all the critical references to Röhl and her twin, the theatre and Röhl reached an amicable settlement on the matter.

=== Feminism ===
In April 2005, Röhl contributed a critical three-part feature to Cicero under the eye-catching titles "Die Sex-Mythen des Feminismus", "Die Gender Mainstreaming-Strategie", and "Der Sündenfall der Alice Schwarzer?". She revealed herself to be a resolute critic of what she called "gender mainstreaming" and of 1970s-style radical feminism of the kind advocated by Alice Schwarzer in her book "Der kleine Unterschied und seine großen Folgen" ("The small difference and its big consequences"). In a headline-grabbing assertion, she states: "This idea of the penis as a weapon of domination is a core part of Schwarzer's doctrine. This kind of feminism can be boiled down as follows: women are people, men must still be made into people". (Note: "Dieses Motiv des Penis als Waffe und Herrschaftsinstrument, ist ein Essential der Schwarzerschen Doktrin. Das Extrakt dieser Art von Feminismus könnte man so zusammen fassen: Frauen sind Menschen, Männer müssen noch erst zu Menschen gemacht werden.")

On the occasion of the awarding of the Theodor W. Adorno Award to the philosopher, literary scholar and queer theoretician Judith Butler, Röhl warmed to her work in her "Bettina Röhl direkt" column in Wirtschaftswoche. However, she has remained critical of the subject of "gender ideology", writing that in Norway the government provides subsidies of nearly €60 million annually for gender research and each project, one by one, has been written off as charlatanry. (Note: "…die staatlich mit fast 60 Millionen Euro jährlich subventionierte Gender-Forschung gerade Knall auf Fall quasi wegen erwiesener Scharlatanerie gestrichen worden.") In a subsequent contribution, she described feminist currents as "a crime against humanity" and "gender mainstreaming" as "spiritual arson" ("geistige Brandstiftung").

=== New Years Eve sexual assaults ===
Following the widely publicised sexual assaults attributed to immigrants in the area between Cologne Cathedral and the city's main railway station (and elsewhere) during New Year's Eve 2015/2016, Röhl accused the television journalist Anja Reschke of downplaying the various assaults.
