= Horst Tomayer =

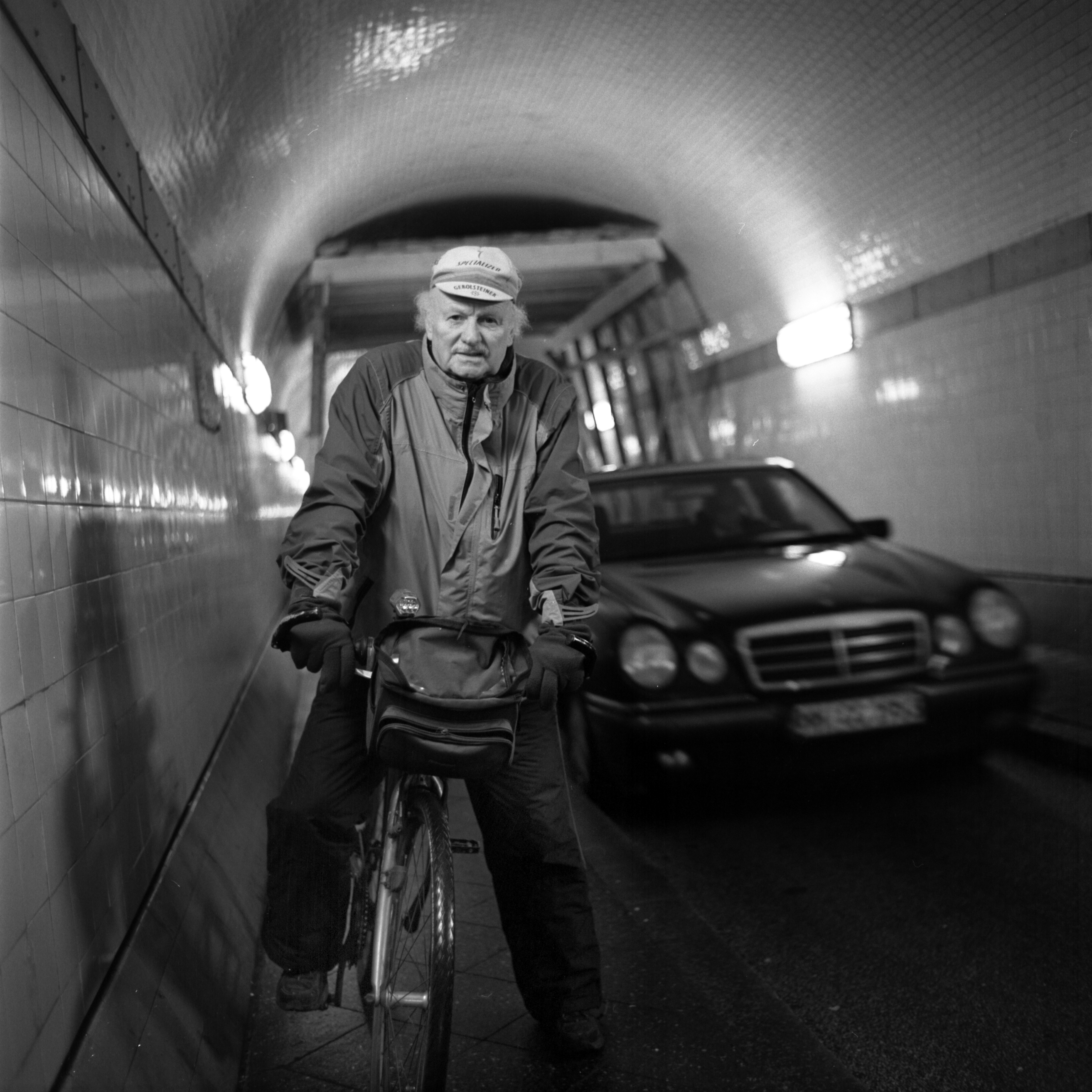
Horst Tomayer. Still frame from Cycling to Liberation (2009)

Horst Tomayer (1 November 1938, Asch, Sudetenland (now Aš, Czech Republic) – 13 December 2013, Hamburg, Germany) was a German poet, columnist, and actor. His column, Tomayers ehrliches Tagebuch, was published from 1982 to 2013 in the monthly magazine Konkret.

== Life ==
After an apprenticeship as an insurance salesman, Tomayer was "a war veteran, pavement painter, IM, Niete 'at the MfS, trainee at Wolfgang Neuss, with columnist Stefan Aust of St. Pauli news and actors in many soap operas'".

In the 1970s, Tomayer worked at the Berlin Extra Service and was the author of numerous radio contributions, especially in the Westdeutscher Rundfunk-based Kritisches Tagebuch. As an employee of the monthly magazine Konkret, he led numerous covert telephone conversations with high officials, entrepreneurs and dignitaries in the 1980s, and, as a "typical Bavarian" reactionary, he produced astonishing expressions, which then appeared in the magazine. He talked with Ernst Jünger, among other things, with the voice of Luis Trenker, which he mentioned in his later published notebooks - until the end did not know that it was a joke of Tomayer.

Tomayer's column, Tomayer's ehrliches Tagebuch, was published until shortly before his death in the German column Konkret. Along with publisher Hermann L. Gremliza, he joined as a performing artist in the series "Sehr gemischtes Doppel".

In 1990, the Federal Constitutional Court ruled that Tomayer's parody of the German anthem Deutschlandlied, had to be regarded as satire and thus art. Tomayer had been previously accused of denigrating the state and its symbols with the lines "German Turks, German Pershings / German Big Mac, German Punk / Shall In the World / Your Old Beautiful Sound".

He died on 13 December 2013 following complications from cancer.

== Works ==
- Neuss’ Testament. Mit Wolfgang Neuss. rororo 891, Rowohlt, Reinbek bei Hamburg 1966; NA: herausgegeben und dokumentiert von Volker Kühn. Syndikat, Frankfurt am Main 1985, ISBN 3-434-46055-1.
- Lachend in die 80er? VSA, Berlin 1976, ISBN 3-87975-091-2.
- Tomayers deutsche Gespräche. Konkret, Hamburg 1987, ISBN 3-922144-37-3.
- Endlich. Postrevolutionäre Kunst im IV. Reich. (Mit Ernst Kahl, Wiglaf Droste und Max Goldt). Neue Gesellschaft für Bildende Kunst, Berlin 1990, ISBN 3-926796-13-8.
- Hirnverbranntes und Feinziseliertes. Zinnober, Hamburg 1990, ISBN 3-89315-008-0.
- Die Stunde der Männertränen. Tiamat, Berlin 1995, ISBN 3-923118-54-6.
- Tomayers ehrliches Tagebuch. Konkret, Hamburg 1996, ISBN 3-930786-07-9.
- German Poems. Nautilus, Hamburg 2002, ISBN 3-89401-341-9.

== CDs ==
- Interessieren Sie sich für Sexualität? Audio-CD, Live-Mitschnitte von Auftritten im Roten Salon Berlin, in Braunschweig und im Toten Salon am Hamburger Thalia Theater. Bittermann, Berlin 2005, ISBN 3-89320-092-4.

== DVD ==
- Das sehr gemischte Doppel. Getrennt dichten – vereint vortragen (mit Hermann L. Gremliza), ISBN 3-930786-48-6.

== Fellows about Tomayer ==
Horst Tomayer hat sich um das deutsche Gedicht verdient gemacht.Robert Gernhardt

Sportsgeist

Hotte, Hüh! – wir Radelnden
Sind die sich selber Adelnden
Ob Sonne oder Regenschauer
Wir radeln gegen Bergsons Dauer
Denn Dasein hier auf Erden
Das gibt’s bloß als Dawerden
Bis zum Exit, bis zum Schlusse
– Süffisante Sisyphusse
Schon biste über siebzig
Und sagst Dir selbst: Dett jiebt sich.
Natias Neutert
