= Institute for Climate Protection, Energy and Mobility =

German research institute

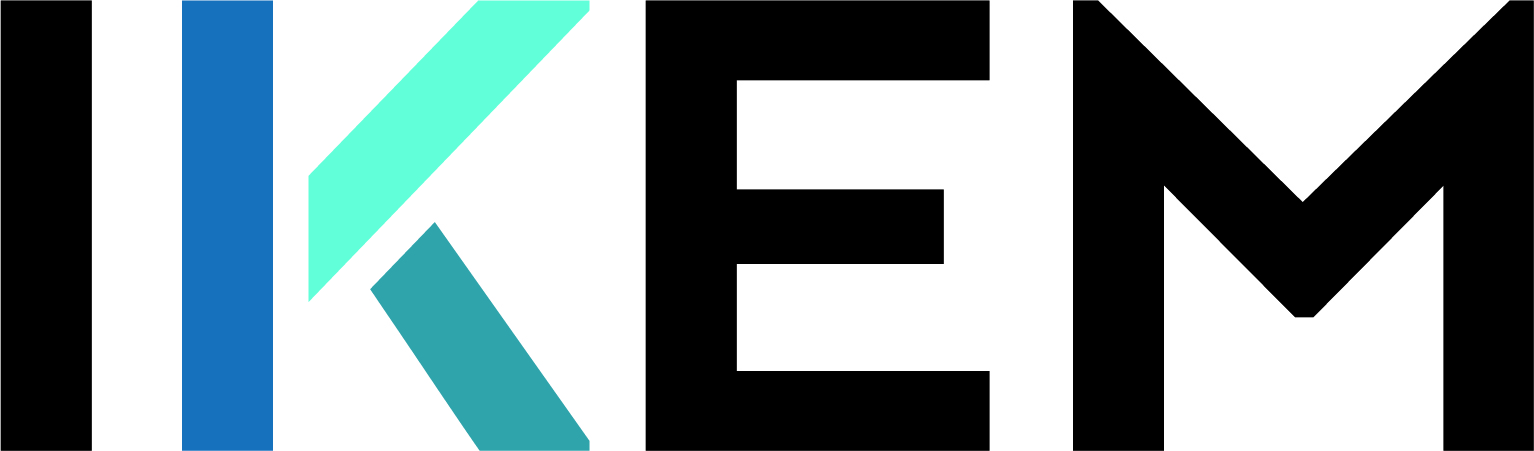

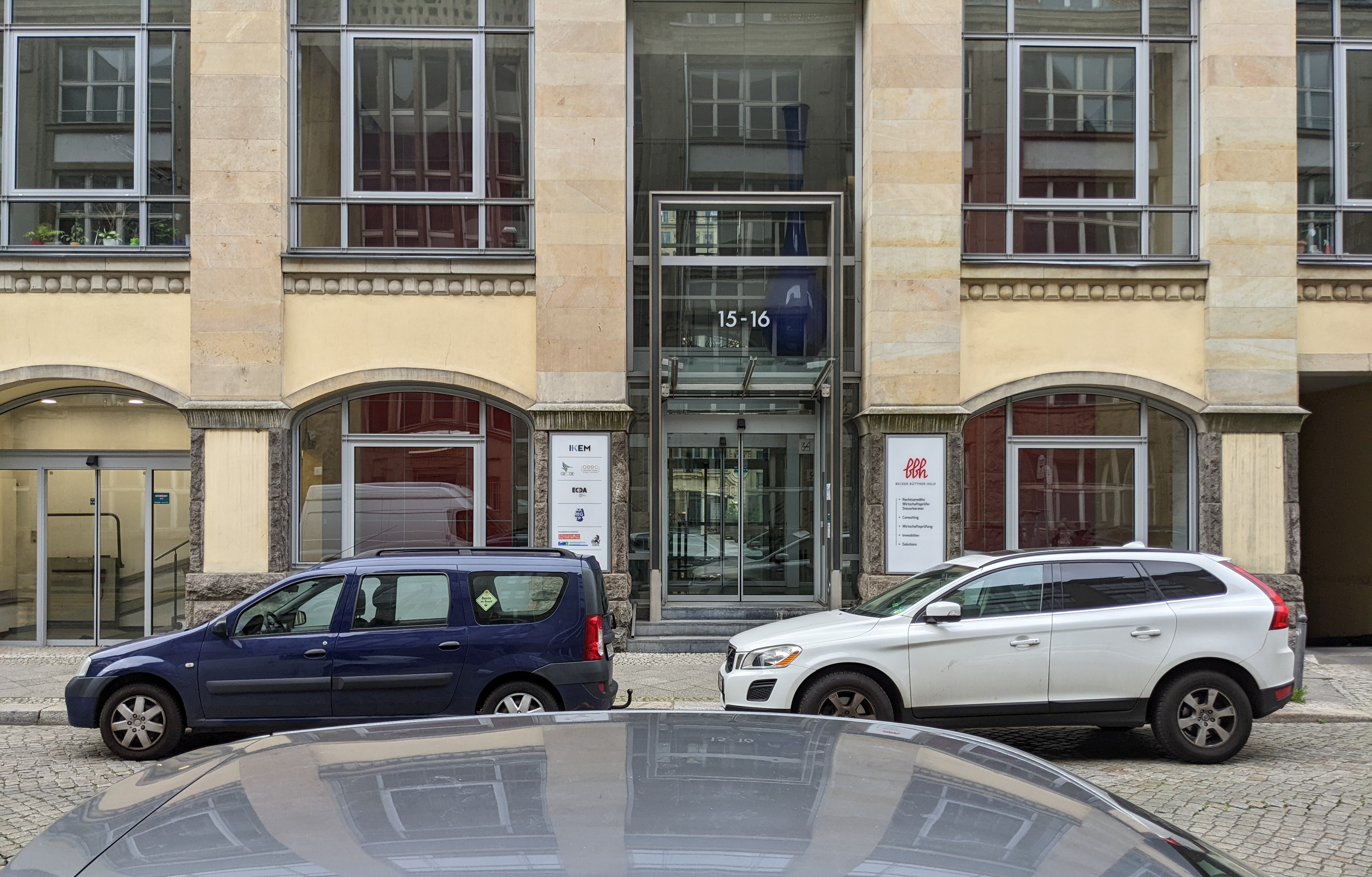
- Abbreviation: IKEM
- Established: 6 November 2009 (17 years ago)
- Founders: Michael Rodi, Richard Hayer
- Types: An-Institut
- Legal status: Registered association
- Country: Germany
- Membership: 23 (2025)
- Chairpersons: Michael Rodi
- Parent organisations: University of Greifswald
- Revenue: 3,551,000 (2023)
- Employees: 48 (2023)

The Institute for Climate Protection, Energy and Mobility (German: Institut für Klimaschutz, Energie und Mobilität e.V. – short IKEM) conducts research into issues of climate change mitigation in the interplay between law, economics and politics. Based in Berlin and Greifswald, IKEM was established as a non-profit organization in 2009 and is affiliated to the University of Greifswald as an independent research institute.

IKEM has been recognized as a non-governmental organisation by the United Nations Economic and Social Council since 2017 and has special consultative status there.

Michael Rodi is Chairman of the Association and Director of the institute. Other members of the executive board are Christian Held (deputy chairman) and Simon Schäfer-Stradowsky.

The scientific advisory board consists of: Christian Held, Jelena Bäumler, Thorsten Beckers, Stephan Breidenbach, Volker Bühner, Olaf Däuper, Dörte Fouquet, Manfred Greis, Valentyn Gvozdiy, Friedrich-Wilhelm Hagemeyer, Barbara Hendricks, Florian Hertweck, Wolfgang Köck, Hans Kreisel, Michael Lehmann, Karsten Lemmer, Michael Mehling, Jörg Müller, Joachim Müller-Kirchenbauer, Sabine Nallinger, Friedbert Pflüger, Barbara Praetorius, Martin Pudlik, Rudi Rienzner, Roman Ringwald, Michael Sauthoff, Susanne Stoll-Kleemann, Juliane Thimet, Jürgen Trittin, Dodo Vögler and Alexander Voigt.

== Research areas ==
IKEM is dedicated to climate protection issues and specializes in legal, economic and social science analyses that develop or optimize strategies for reducing greenhouse gas emissions and dealing with the consequences of climate change.

IKEM also conducts research into sustainable energy supply. Key areas include analyses on the expansion of renewable energies, energy efficiency, energy storage, Power-to-X and the transition to low-carbon economies.

In the field of transport, IKEM focuses on new forms of mobility, innovative mobility concepts, autonomous driving and electromobility. The research also examines the interactions of transport with economic, energy and climate policy issues.

The development of operator and business models as well as research into acceptance and user potential play a special role in all of these areas.

== Projects ==
IKEM works on scientific projects that are funded by public and private clients and funding organisations. These include the Federal Ministry for the Environment, Nature Conservation, Building and Nuclear Safety, the Federal Ministry for Economic Affairs and Climate Action, the Federal Ministry for Digital and Transport, the Federal Environment Agency, various state ministries, companies and European funding programmes.

Since its foundation in 2009, IKEM has been involved in over 260 projects.

== Publications ==
The findings from the scientific work and from the interdisciplinary expert panels and conferences organised by IKEM are published in the form of studies, journal articles, statements and the IKEM publication series. The institute also publishes doctoral theses and co-edits the legal journal "Klima und Recht".

== Events ==
IKEM organises an annual international summer academy on current energy and climate policy topics under the title 'IKEM Academy "Energy & Climate"' (until 2018 'Summer Academy "Energy and the Environment"'). In addition to regular discussion groups such as the 'Forum Wärmewende' and the 'Berliner Energiestammtisch' as well as project-related events, the institute organises an annual conference on a specific research topic ('IKEM Annual Conference').
