= 2005 German visa affair =

Political scandal

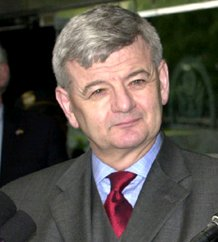
Joschka Fischer

The visa affair is the name given by the German press to the controversy that arose in early 2005 over a change in the procedure for issuing visas to foreign nationals seeking to enter Germany from non-EU states in Eastern Europe. The Cologne criminal court stated, that the new visa policy put in place in 2000, had dispensed with safeguards against abuses such as illegal immigration and human trafficking in favour of speeding up the issuing process for tourist visas and had led to a massive increase in these practices. The affair prompted the resignation of Minister of State Ludger Volmer of the Green party from his roles in the Bundestag foreign affairs committee and as foreign affairs spokesperson of his party. The claims severely damaged the reputation of his party colleague Foreign Minister Joschka Fischer. The allegation was that changes had been made to the previous tougher visa rules, without the correct political procedure.

== Background ==
=== 1999–2000 ===
In 1999, the German embassy in Kyiv alone issued more than 150,000 visas for Germany. Long queues formed in front of the embassy. Applicants reported that Ukrainian security personnel demanded DM 100–500 (€50–250) to get ahead in the queue.

At the beginning of 2000, Minister of State at the Federal Foreign Office Ludger Volmer issued a decree, known as "Volmer's Decree," which extended the powers of the individual embassies in deciding visa applications. The decree aimed at making travel to Germany easier. When in doubt, the application was to be decided in favour of the applicant.

At the same time, visa applications directly from travel agencies were introduced. This regulation was opposed by the Bundesgrenzschutz (Federal Border Guard) as well as by the Federal Criminal Police Office (BKA), because they feared that it would lead to easier migration into Germany for criminals. They cited a criminal court decision against the manager of a travel agency who organized illegal migration into Germany. In this case, the tourists went underground, became prostitutes, or left Germany for other countries of the European Union.

On 9 March 2000, Minister of the Interior Otto Schily (SPD) wrote a letter to Minister of Foreign Affairs Joschka Fischer, saying that he saw the "Volmer's Decree" as a violation of the Aliens Act as well as of the Schengen Treaty. As of 2005, it is not clear if Schily intervened further, or if he did not, his reasons for not intervening.

=== 2001–2003 ===
On 2 May 2001, embassies world-wide were advised to accept the Carnet de Touriste travel insurance introduced by Helmut Kohl's CDU in 1995. These insurance documents covered medical costs incurred abroad as well as any costs resulting from deportation. They were accepted in place of a written guarantee by a German citizen to prove that the visa applicant could finance their stay and return home.

The German Automobile Club (ADAC) sold between 120,000 and 150,000 of these insurance documents, the Allianz insurance company sold more than 35,000, and the ITREC GmbH company more than 31,000. The Foreign Office also advised the embassies to accept similar travel insurance documents from the Reiseschutz AG, owned by private entrepreneur Kübler. The press claims this played an important role in smuggling people into Germany. The Ministry of the Interior was informed about this by the Federal Crime Agency (German: Bundeskriminalamt).

In the trial of Anaton Berg, the Cologne criminal court claimed that the "Volmer's Decree", the acceptance of travel insurance documents instead of guarantors or proof of credit-worthiness, and the applications for visas at travel agencies had led to mass human trafficking. In the verdict, this was described as "a cold putsch against the law".

In July 2001, the Foreign Office stopped applications for visas at travel agencies from 1 October 2001. Instead of going to a travel agency, every applicant once again had to go to the visa department in an embassy. However, it was assumed that a travel insurance document sufficed as proof of the applicant's credit-worthiness.

On 29 January 2002, the Foreign Office decreed that it was possible to buy and sell travel insurance documents directly in foreign countries. The press reported that this increased the problems in Kyiv and that traders sold travel insurance documents for as much as $1,000.

On 8 February 2002, German ambassador in Kyiv Dietmar Stüdemann reported that the embassy was flooded with applicants proving their credit-worthiness with travel insurance documents.

In March 2003, "Volmer's Decree" which was then called the "Fischer degree" since it was his responsibility, was cancelled. Once more, applicants' credit-worthiness had to be examined. From April 2003, travel insurance documents were no longer accepted.

In February 2004, a German regional court found the defendant, Ukrainian-born Anaton Berg, guilty of people trafficking and smuggling. The court found that laxness in issuing German visas in Ukraine, where about 300,000 tourist visas were issued to visit Germany between 2000 and 2002, made it easier for Berg to commit his offenses.

=== 2005 ===
On 20 January 2005, the first meeting of the Commission of Inquiry was held in the German Bundestag. This commission, a kind of judicial hearing, was set up with the votes of the opposition parties CDU and CSU. The CDU/CSU parliamentary group was represented by Eckart von Klaeden.

On 12 February 2005, Ludger Volmer retired as Speaker for Foreign Affairs of the Green Party's parliamentary group in the Bundestag. This was after the media criticized his work as a consultant for the company Synthesis GmbH, which worked for the Bundesdruckerei that was privatized in 1994, producing identity cards, banknotes and other secure documents.

For the first time in over six years, in February 2005, opinion polls did not show Joschka Fischer in first place in the popularity vote. Instead, the leading position in the popularity vote went to Christian Democratic Ministerpräsident of Lower Saxony Christian Wulff, with Fischer coming in second.

On 15 February, Fischer agreed to testify before the special parliamentary commission. In a statement, he accepted what he called "political responsibility" for mistakes that may have been made by German consulates in Ukraine.

In March 2005, during his first trip to Berlin since being sworn in, President Viktor Yushchenko of Ukraine in a speech before the German Bundestag asked for a visa-free regime for business people, students, artists and young people seeking contact with EU countries.

On 22 March 2005, the media reported that the Federal Chancellery had been informed about a dispute between Otto Schily and Joschka Fischer about visa politics as early as March 2000. It was said that Chancellor Gerhard Schröder himself was not informed.

On 26 March 2005, Eckart von Klaeden called for Joschka Fischer to reveal the truth before the elections in North Rhine-Westphalia. The CDU/CSU tried to force a statement from Fischer.

On 31 March 2005, the media reported that Fischer would speak before the Inquiry Commission in mid-April, earlier than previously expected. The testimony of SPD Minister of the Interior Otto Schily was scheduled for June.

In April 2005, the media reported that there were difficulties in 2004. Fischer claimed the difficulties were resolved in mid-2004. Eckart von Klaeden said on German television channel ZDF that the Commission of Inquiry wanted to investigate the differing statement of Fischer in March 2005. On 21 April, the Commission of Inquiry heard Ludger Volmer and the State Secretary at the Foreign Office at the time, Gunter Pleuger. This Commission of Inquiry hearing, which lasted more than 12 hours, was the first such hearing broadcast by television and was watched by more than 400,000 people.

At a second all-day televised hearing on 25 April 2005, Fischer admitted that mistakes had been made during his time in office when thousands of visas to Germany were granted to criminals and prostitutes from Ukraine between 2000 and 2002. Fischer also dismissed opposition arguments that the security and well-being of Germany was significantly harmed by the influx of immigrants, and he contended that once the problem was discovered in 2002 the policy was immediately corrected. Fischer's decision to admit some responsibility came after weeks of stonewalling by his party, which had even tried to delay him appearing before the special parliamentary commission. The hearing lasted 14 hours and was viewed by 700,000 viewers just on Phoenix, a 10.5% quota. After the hearing, members of the CDU/CSU continued to ask for Fischer's retirement, whereas members of SPD and The Greens said that Fischer performed well and that the CDU/CSU members in the commission were not able to show evidence for their accusations.

On 29 April, the Foreign Office passed the relevant documents to the European Commission, following months of pressure.

In May 2005, the German ambassador to Ukraine said the visa policies of Fischer were lax and eased the application of visas. He also said that the "Volmer Decree" discouraged the embassy's employees.

On 2 June 2005, the Commission of Inquiry was adjourned after a short session of only 30 minutes. The commission called an end to the hearing of evidence with the majority of its SPD/Greens members. CDU and FDP on the other hand were likely to appeal to the Constitutional Court should the matter be dropped permanently. Some ministers, who were due to appear before the commission, including Otto Schily and Frank-Walter Steinmeier of the Federal Chancellery, were not questioned in the end. Instead, the work of the commission was prematurely ended due to the widely anticipated call for an early election.

On 15 June 2005, in a provisional ruling, the Constitutional Court considered the end of the hearings of evidence on 2 June, to be unconstitutional and ordered the Commission of Inquiry to continue with its timetable as planned unless an unexpected snap election was called. This would mean the cancelled hearings of ministers like Schily (Minister of the Interior) and Steinmeier (Minister of State of the Federal Chancellery) would take place after all.

On 4 August, the European Commission decided that while the lax system at the heart of the German visa scandal violated EU norms, including the Schengen Agreement and the Common Consular Instructions, Germany had since remedied the problem with a reformed policy that complied with EU rules. In response, Member of the European Parliament Joachim Wuermeling of Germany called for the European Commission to investigate Germany's new policies, claiming that these too were flawed.

== Sources ==
- Charles Hawley (22 February 2005). "Political Scandal: Joschka Fischer with His Back Against the Wall". Spiegel Online International.
- "Fischer Visa Scandal: Battling Human Trafficking in Germany". Spiegel Online International. 22 February 2005.
- Ray Furlong (14 February 2005). "'German visa policy sparks furore". British Broadcasting Corporation.
- "Fischer Goes on Offensive in Visa Affair". Deutsche Welle. 26 February 2005.
- Yuliya Popova (21 April 2010). "Germany's Fischer preps Kyiv students for future". Kyiv Post.
