= Protagonist (film) =

- Theatrical release poster
- Directed by: Jessica Yu
- Written by: Jessica Yu
- Produced by: Greg Carr; Noble Smith; Jessica Yu; Elise Pearlstein; Susan West
- Starring: Hans-Joachim Klein; Mark Pierpont; Joe Loya; Mark Salzman
- Cinematography: Russell Harper
- Edited by: Jessica Yu
- Music by: Jeff Beal
- Distributed by: IFC Films
- Release date: November 30, 2007
- Running time: 90 minutes
- Country: United States
- Languages: English; German (Klein only); Greek (certain puppetry segments)

Protagonist is a 2007 American documentary film about the parallels between human life and Euripidean dramatic structure. The film was written and directed by Jessica Yu.

It featured extensive interviews with terrorist Hans-Joachim Klein, ex-gay Christian evangelist Mark Pierpont, bank-robber Joe Loya, and martial-arts enthusiast Mark Salzman (the director's husband). Interspersed with the interviews are scenes from ancient Greek drama performed by puppets and narrated by Marina Sirtis and Chris Diamantopoulos.
