= Friedbert Pflüger =

German politician (born 1955)

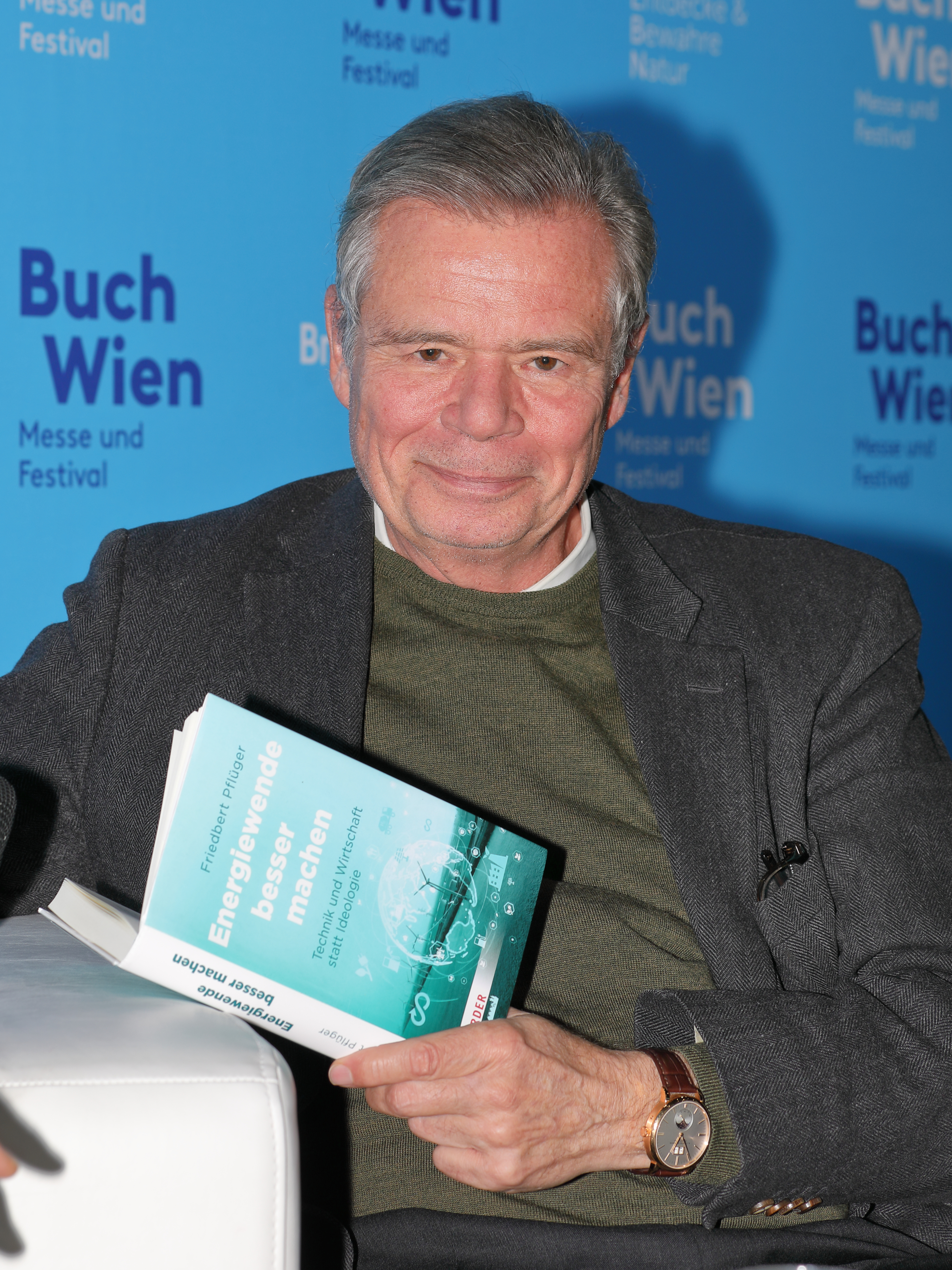
Friedbert Pflüger in 2024

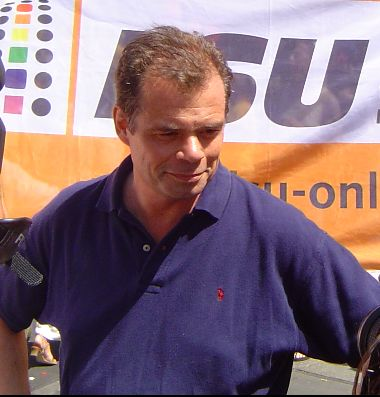
Pflüger in 2005

Friedbert Pflüger (born 6 March 1955) is a former German politician of the Christian Democratic Union (CDU). He was a Member of the German Bundestag (1990–2006). He was Secretary of State in the Federal Ministry of Defence (2005–2006), and the CDU's candidate for Governing Mayor of Berlin in the 2006 Berlin state election. He was a member of the Berlin House of Representatives (2006–2011) and a member of the executive board of the CDU (2000–2010). Today, he is a businessman and teaches Energy and Climate Security at the Center for Advanced Security, Strategic and Integration Studies (CASSIS), University of Bonn. He is visiting professor at King's College London.

== Early life and education ==
Friedbert Pflüger was born in Hanover. He received his Abitur (university entrance qualification) at Friedrich Schiller High School in Hanover in 1973. He studied political science, public and constitutional law and economics in Göttingen, Bonn and at Harvard. He received his Master of Arts degree in 1980 and in 1982 his Dr. phil. degree. His doctoral thesis was directed by Karl Dietrich Bracher and examined US-foreign policy "between idealism and realism". In 1980/81, he was a graduate student associate at the Harvard Center for International Affairs (CFIA) under the auspices of Samuel Huntington. He also taught a seminar on US human rights policy at Harvard.

== Political career ==
Since 1971, Pflüger has been a member of the Christian Democratic Union of Germany (CDU). The first political offices he held were as deputy chairman of the European Democrat Students (EDS) from 1976 to 1978 and as federal chairman of the Association of Christian Democrat Students (RCDS) from 1977 to 1978.

From 1977 to 1985, Pflüger was also a member of the federal executive committee of the Young Union (JU), the youth organization of the CDU/CSU, under the leadership of successive chairmen Matthias Wissmann and Christoph Böhr.

From 1981 to 1984, Pflüger worked for the governing mayor of Berlin, Richard von Weizsäcker. When Weizsäcker became the Federal President of Germany in 1984, Pflüger became his spokesman and speechwriter, a job he kept during all the presidency until 1989. Until today, Pflüger sees von Weizsäcker as a "father figure".

Between 1989 and 1991, Pflüger worked as manager of the Matuschka Group, Berlin, at that time a leading German investment bank.

=== Member of the German Bundestag, 1990–2006 ===
In the 1990 elections, Pflüger became a member of the Bundestag, which he remained until 2006.

In parliament, Pflüger served as disarmament policy spokesman of the CDU/CSU parliamentary group from 1994 to 1998. From 1998 to 2002, he was chairman of the Committee on European Affairs. In the years from 2002 to 2005, he served as foreign policy spokesman of the CDU/CSU Parliamentary Group.

Between 2000 and 2010, Plüger was a member of the federal executive committee of the CDU under the leadership of chairwoman Angela Merkel.

In the negotiations to form a coalition government with the Social Democratic Party (SPD) under Chancellor Angela Merkel following the 2005 federal elections, Pflüger led the CDU/CSU delegation in the working group on foreign affairs; his counterpart from the SPD was Gernot Erler. In November 2005, he was appointed Parliamentary State Secretary at the Federal Ministry of Defence under minister Franz Josef Jung, a position in which he remained until October 2006. During his time in office, he managed to negotiate the continuing cooperation with President Karimov and the Uzbek government to use the Termez airbase by the German armed forces in December 2005.

=== Career in state politics, 2006–2010 ===
In March 2006, Pflüger was elected the top candidate of the CDU for that year's state elections in Berlin. After spending almost no time preparing his election campaign, he lost to incumbent Klaus Wowereit of the SPD, as all the polls had indicated. Keeping his promise to remain active in Berlin politics even in case of an electoral defeat, Pflüger assumed the responsibility as the chairman of the CDU Parliamentary Group in the Berlin House of Representatives and gave up his position as a Parliamentary State Secretary. As an opposition leader, he fought, unsuccessfully, against the closure of Tempelhof Airport. Another aim of his work was to create a more business-friendly environment in Berlin to reduce the high unemployment rate. Pflüger was an outspoken advocate of opening the CDU for a possible coalition with the Free Democrats (FDP) and the Greens (a so-called "Jamaica"-coalition).

From 2006 until 2012, Pflüger also served as member of the Executive Council of the European Peoples Party (EPP).

During his political career, Pflüger wrote books, especially on environment/energy and on foreign and security policy. A New World War? The Islamist Challenge to the West (Ein neuer Weltkrieg? Die islamistische Herausforderung des Westens), which was published in 2004.

== Career in the private sector ==
In 2010, Pflüger announced his decision to withdraw from his political functions and to focus on his role as the Director of the European Centre for Energy and Resource Security (EUCERS), King's College London. He is also Senior Advisor to Roland Berger Strategy Consultants.

Pflüger is also managing partner of two business consultancies in Berlin and Arbil (Iraqi-Kurdistan). Since 2016, he has been chairman of the Internet Economy Foundation (IE.F).

== Other activities ==
- AIESEC Germany, Member of the Board of Trustees
- Gegen Vergessen – Für Demokratie, Member of the Board

== Personal life ==
Pflüger was married to Margarita Mathiopoulos from 1987 until 2006. He has since remarried and has two children (one son and one daughter). His former dachshund "Oskar" now lives with Berlin's famous hairdresser Udo Walz.
