= Joe Loya =

American bank robber and author

Joe Loya Jr. (born 1961) is an American writer and former convicted bank robber. He grew up in Los Angeles, and from 1985 was robbing banks in Southern California until he began a seven-year prison sentence in Lompoc Federal Penitentiary. While in prison he was placed in solitary confinement for violent behavior. During this time he developed a friendship with the author Richard Rodriguez. After his release in 1996 he wrote about prison life for the Pacific News Service. He published his biography, The Man Who Outgrew His Prison Cell, in 2005.

== Early life ==
Joe Loya Jr. was born in East Los Angeles in 1961. His father, Joe Loya Sr., was a former gang member who found redemption in Catholicism and later the Southern Baptist Church. Joe Loya Sr. became a preacher at a local Baptist Church. Joe Loya Jr.'s mother was diagnosed with kidney disease, and two and a half years later, she died from the disease. Joe Loya Sr. eventually remarried, but Joe Loya Sr.'s temper and violent behavior created a hostile environment. After an altercation with his father when he was 16, Joe Loya Jr. stabbed his father in the neck. Joe Loya Sr. survived the incident and is still alive. Joe Loya Jr. is quoted as saying, "Once you try and kill your dad, no one scares you.". After the incident, Joe Loya Jr. was briefly put in foster care but went back to live with his father for his last year of high school.

== Early criminal career ==
Joe Loya's initiation to crime started with scamming parishioners at his father's church, writing bad checks, stealing cars and other various money scams including a $30,000 defrauding scheme. With warrants in five counties in Southern California, Loya went to Mexico briefly to evade the law. There, he was inspired by Robin Hood-esque stories about Pancho Villa, who robbed banks in America before coming back to Mexico. During Loya's early criminal career, he gained a reputation as a ladies' man, a charismatic and manipulative character who lived a flamboyant, expensive lifestyle.

== Bank robberies ==
Loya's first robbery was in 1985 at a San Diego branch of Bank of America. Loya handed the teller a note that said "We have a bomb. I have a gun. Give me the money NOW!!!" Loya made off with $4,300. Later that year, Loya was arrested on charges that included check fraud and car theft, and he served two years in jail. When Loya was released in 1988, he immediately started robbing banks. Loya is estimated to have robbed between 30 and 40 banks between 1988 and 1989. Loya's style of robbery was notable to officials due to his calm demeanor, frequency and boldness. Loya was not motivated by drug use, as many other bank robbers at the time were. Loya would rob up to four banks in one day, as well as banks right next door to each other. Loya's tactics included layering on clothing that he would take off as he was getting away, choosing banks close to freeway on ramps, and generally working alone. Loya never pointed a gun at a teller. Loya's largest take came in January 1989, when he stole $32,713 from a bank vault. Loya was erroneously dubbed the "Beirut Bandit" by officials due to his Middle Eastern looks and well spoken English.

During this time, Loya told friends and family that he was a cook at Crocodile Cafe in Pasadena. Loya continued to live a flashy lifestyle, wearing tailored suits, driving a Mazda RX-7., and flying to Las Vegas.

On February 27, 1989, Loya was caught after robbing a Bank of America in Cerritos. His take was $8,557, and police caught him seven miles away from the bank due to the placement of a homing device in the money. Loya's punishment was lenient due to charming several officers; bail was set at $50,000, and he was spared jail time because he never pointed a gun at anyone during the robberies. However, upon release, Loya hit five more banks before getting arrested again. Loya was estimated to have hit between 30 and 40 banks, with a total take of around $250,000, but due to lack of evidence, Loya was prosecuted for ten robberies, with a take of $72,759. Loya took a plea deal for seven years.

== Incarceration ==
After taking the plea deal, Loya went to Lompoc Federal Penitentiary where he served his seven-year sentence. At Lompoc, Loya engaged in violent behavior that included stabbing a man in the face, biting off his cell mate's earlobe, and throwing feces at guards. Three and a half years into his sentence, Loya was sent to solitary confinement. He stayed in solitary for two years. While there, Loya was inspired when he saw Richard Rodriguez, a Mexican American author, on The MacNeil-Lehrer News Hour. Loya and Rodriguez cultivated a pen pal relationship, with letters being exchanged weekly.

== Writing career ==
Loya was released from Lompoc in the summer of 1996. Due to his close relationship with Rodriguez, Loya was able to attain employment as a stringer for the Pacific News Service. In that position, Loya wrote about prison life as well as asking for compassion for prisoners. Loya's career was bolstered when he wrote an article about adjusting to life outside of prison for LA Weekly. Loya was promoted to associate editor at Pacific News Service, and his articles appeared in The Los Angeles Times and The Washington Post. Loya's biography, The Man Who Outgrew His Prison Cell: Confessions of a Bank Robber, was published by Harper Collins in 2005. He was profiled in the movie Protagonist, and his story was the basis for an episode of I Almost Got Away With It. Loya is also close friends with Piper Kerman, the writer of Orange Is the New Black. Loya currently resides in the San Francisco Bay Area, where he continues to perform and create.

== Film career ==
Loya worked closely with director Edgar Wright on the film Baby Driver, released in 2017, where he gave insight into various techniques commonly used on his jobs and in others. He also has a small cameo in the film.
