= Klaus Rainer Röhl =

German journalist and author (1928–2021)

Klaus Rainer Röhl (1 December 1928 – 30 November 2021) was a German journalist and author, best known as founder, owner, publisher and editor-in-chief of konkret, the most influential magazine on the German political left from the 1960s to the early 1970s. He later became critical of communism and leftist tendencies.

== Journalism ==
Known as "K2R", Röhl founded the left-wing monthly magazine Studentenkurier in 1955. Röhl had been a secret Communist since 1951, and the magazine survived due to funding from the Communist East German government. In 1957, the magazine was renamed konkret and rose to prominence in the 1960s as the primary magazine of the Außerparlamentarische Opposition and the German student movement. He had previously founded a weekly newspaper about and for the Hamburg sex trade, St Pauli Nachrichten. After the Communist Party of Germany was banned as unconstitutional in West Germany in 1956, he became a clandestine member of the then illegal party as an act of support.

He was married to Ulrike Meinhof from 1961 until the spring of 1968, before her descent into left-wing terrorism. Their marriage produced two daughters, Regine and Bettina Röhl, who became an author critical of communism and far-left extremism. Ulrike later co-founded the Red Army Faction, also known as the RAF or the Baader-Meinhof Gang, together with Gudrun Ensslin, Andreas Baader, and Jan-Carl Raspe.

== Harassment accusations ==
Articles in konkret openly advocated sex with minors. Röhl's marriage with Ulrike was his second marriage. From his first marriage he also has a daughter Αnja Röhl, who in May 2010 accused him of sexual harassment against her.

== Change of course ==
As a consequence of the radicalization in the late 1960s, and subsequent leftist terrorism, Röhl turned away from Marxism and gave his magazine a more moderate tone. This led to a power struggle between Röhl and those who supported the use of violence against the government (particularly his former wife), and his home in Hamburg was attacked in 1969 by Ulrike Meinhof and some konkret staff members. In June 1970, after Ulrike's command, Monica Berberich and Marianne X took Röhl and Ulrike's daughters from a house where Ulrike's sister, Wienke had hidden the children, in order to transfer them to Gibellina, a commune in Sicily where other left-wing families and communists lived. According to Jutta Ditfurth, Ulrike's biographer, Ulrike believed she would win the custody case over the children from Röhl which meant that Wienke would take custody of the kids. Finally, journalist Stefan Aust, a long-time friend of Röhl abducted the children after Peter Homan misinformed him that Ulrike was about to send the children to a Jordanian boarding house where other children of refugees used to live. By that time, Röhl was on holiday in Italy. Aust delivered the girls to him in an apartment near Plaza Navona. Röhl and his daughters lived under constant police protection for some time, fearing a supposed attack or abduction by RAF members. Röhl was also supporting BKA's investigation providing information about Meinhof's past, places where she could be hiding, etc.

The magazine konkret was dissolved in 1973. The year before, Röhl had joined the Social Democratic Party of Germany. For some years, he then published the moderate leftist magazine das da. From 1981 to 1984, he published the left-wing magazine Spontan. However, from the mid-1980s, his political views gradually changed towards liberal conservatism. Röhl was a member of the German liberal party, the Free Democratic Party of Germany after 1995, and was then active in Liberale Offensive, the right-wing faction of the party that tried to revive the national liberal tradition represented by Gustav Stresemann, Thomas Dehler, and Erich Mende, among others. He was also a regular columnist for the newspaper Junge Freiheit, and earned a doctorate in history at the Free University of Berlin under the supervision of Ernst Nolte in 1993, with a dissertation on cooperation between Communists and National Socialists against the Social Democratic Party (Nähe zum Gegner, published as a book in 1994). He wrote several books critical of communism and the far-left.

== Personal life and death ==
From the early 1970s until his death, his partner was Danae Coulmas, a Greek diplomat, translator and author.

Röhl died on 30 November 2021, a day shy of his 93rd birthday.

== In films ==
Röhl was portrayed by Hans Werner Meyer in the 2008 film Der Baader Meinhof Komplex.

== Publications ==
- Fünf Finger sind keine Faust. Kiepenheuer und Witsch, Köln 1974, ISBN 3-462-01002-6, Munich 1998, ISBN 3-8004-1365-5 (autobiographical)
- Die Genossin. Roman. Molden, Wien 1975, ISBN 3-217-00677-1 (on Ulrike Meinhof)
- Lustobjekt. Ein kleiner Irrtum und seine fatalen Folgen. Europaverlag, Wien 1980, ISBN 3-203-50735-8
- Aufstand der Amazonen. Geschichte einer Legende. Econ-Verlag, Düsseldorf 1982, ISBN 3-430-17797-9
- Die verteufelte Lust. Die Geschichte der Prüderie und die Unterdrückung der Frau. Hoffmann und Campe, Hamburg 1983, ISBN 3-455-08695-0
- Nähe zum Gegner. Kommunisten und Nationalsozialisten im Berliner BVG-Streik von 1932. Campus Verlag, Frankfurt/Main 1994, ISBN 3-593-35038-6
- Linke Lebenslügen. Ullstein, Berlin 1994, ISBN 3-548-36634-1. (new ed.. Universitas, Munich 2001, ISBN 3-8004-1430-9)
- Deutsches Phrasenlexikon. Lehrbuch der politischen Korrektheit für Anfänger und Fortgeschrittene. Ullstein, Berlin 2001, ISBN 3-550-07077-2; Mit den geänderten Untertitel: Politisch korrekt von A-Z. 4., revised ed.. Universitas, Munich 2001, ISBN 3-8004-1409-0
- Deutscher Narrenspiegel. Hypochonder und Schutzheilige. Universitas, München 1998, ISBN 3-8004-1338-8
- Riesen und Wurzelzwerge. Das Dilemma der deutschen Linken. Universitas, Munich 1999, ISBN 3-8004-1388-4
- Verbotene Trauer. Die vergessenen Opfer. Universitas, Munich 2002, ISBN 3-8004-1423-6
- Deutsche Tabus. Universitas, München 2004, ISBN 3-8004-1467-8
- Du bist Deutschland. Satiren aus der europäischen Provinz. Universitas, Munich 2007, ISBN 978-3-8004-1473-4
- "Einige Eiffelturmlängen über allem übrigen!" Erinnerungen an Kurt Hiller, in: Rüdiger Schütt (ed.), Zwischen den Kriegen. Werner Riegel, Klaus Rainer Röhl und Peter Rühmkorf: Briefwechsel mit Kurt Hiller 1953–1971, Edition Text+Kritik, Munich 2009, S. 334–336 (ebenda auch Briefe an und von Hiller), ISBN 978-3-88377-997-3
