= Cicero (magazine) =

German monthly political magazine

- Former editors: Wolfram Weimer; Christoph Schwennicke; Michael Naumann; Alexander Marguier
- Categories: Political magazine
- Frequency: Monthly
- First issue: 1 March 2004; 22 years ago
- Company: res publica
- Country: Germany
- Based in: Potsdam; Berlin
- Language: German
- Website: www.cicero.de
- ISSN: 1613-4826

Cicero - Magazin für politische Kultur is a monthly magazine focusing on politics and culture. The magazine, which has a conservative political stance, is based in Berlin, Germany.

== History and contributors ==
Cicero was launched in Potsdam in March 2004. The magazine was later moved to Berlin.

The first editor-in-chief of the magazine was Wolfram Weimer, who also served as the editor of the daily newspaper Die Welt from 2000 to 2002. Alexander Marguier was the editor-in-chief of Cicero until 2010. Michael Naumann is among the former editors-in-chief of the magazine. As of 2012 the editor-in-chief of the magazine was Christoph Schwennicke. The magazine has eleven editorial staff. From 2007 to 2009 Alexander Görlach served as the executive editor of the online edition. Among its columnists are Bela Anda, Philipp Blom and Amelie Fried. A conservative journalist Bettina Röhl also contributed to Cicero.

In 2011, the magazine initiated the pencil heads project which covered the carved busts of leading politicians like Barack Obama into the lead of Cicero-branded pencils. These pencils were sent to their likenesses in special boxes to promote the magazine's interviews with major leaders.

== Political leaning and content ==
The target audience of Cicero is German intellectuals looking for wider range of political views. The political stance of Cicero is right-wing/conservative.

The contents of the magazine focus on opinion forming through first-hand views of the editors. Cicero has four main sections: The first section called "Weltbühne" ("World Forum" in English) provides analyses and discusses internationally significant topics and people. The second, "Berliner Republik" ("Berlin Republic" in English), is a forum for German society. The next one, "Kapital", analyses economic affairs and the last one, "Salon", deals with the modern cultural life from different angles. In addition, the magazine's "Debate" section covers contribution of several leading figures including Al Gore and Prince Felix von Löwenstein. The magazine also publishes interviews the first of which was with Gerhard Schröder, the former German chancellor. In 2006, Dagmar Herzog featured her significant study on sexuality, memory and morality, and their relation to German fascism in the monthly.

Cicero publishes a list of 500 most influential intellectuals in Germany. In December 2015 the magazine named the Russian president Vladimir Putin as the Man of the Year.

== Circulation ==
Cicero has enjoyed increasing levels of circulation, though its circulation is modest. It was 62,700 copies during the third quarter of 2005. It grew to 70,000 copies in the third quarter of 2006, to 73,200 copies in the third quarter of 2007 and to 77,077 copies for the second quarter of 2008. Its circulation further rose to 77,600 copies in the third quarter of 2008, to 81,000 copies in the third quarter of 2009 and to 82,600 copies in the third quarter of 2010. The magazine had a circulation of 83,527 copies in 2014. The magazine sold 43,800 copies in 2021.

== Incidents ==
The magazine's editing department was raided by the agents from federal criminal police office and searched by the public prosecutors of Potsdam on 12 September 2005 following its publication of a portrait of the Jordanian terrorist Abu Musab Zarqawi in April 2005. The incident was called "Cicero affair". The German Supreme Court in Karlsruhe decided in February 2007 that the raid by the agents had been unconstitutional.

== Award ==
At the Lead Award 2019, the Cicero editors-in-chief Alexander Marguier and Christoph Schwennicke were awarded the bronze prize in the category of the magazine debate of the year.

== See also ==
- List of magazines in Germany
