= Rote Hilfe e.V. =

German far-left prisoner support group

Rote Hilfe e.V. Red Aid
- Founded: 1975
- Type: registered association
- Location: Göttingen
- Region served: Germany
- Members: 19,000 (2025)
- Board of directors: Florian Kaufmann; Marie Melior; Anja Sommerfeld
- Website: www.rote-hilfe.de

Rote Hilfe e.V. ("Red Aid," abbreviated RH) is a German association that supports left‑wing activists who come into conflict with the law in the course of their political activities. It describes itself as a "party‑independent, cross‑current left‑wing protection and solidarity organisation." With a history of more than 100 years, Rote Hilfe is the oldest — and, with around 19,000 members (as of 2025), the largest — organisation within the German left‑wing scene. Its membership has grown significantly in recent years. The association comprises around 50 local and regional groups and maintains a federal office in Göttingen.

== History ==
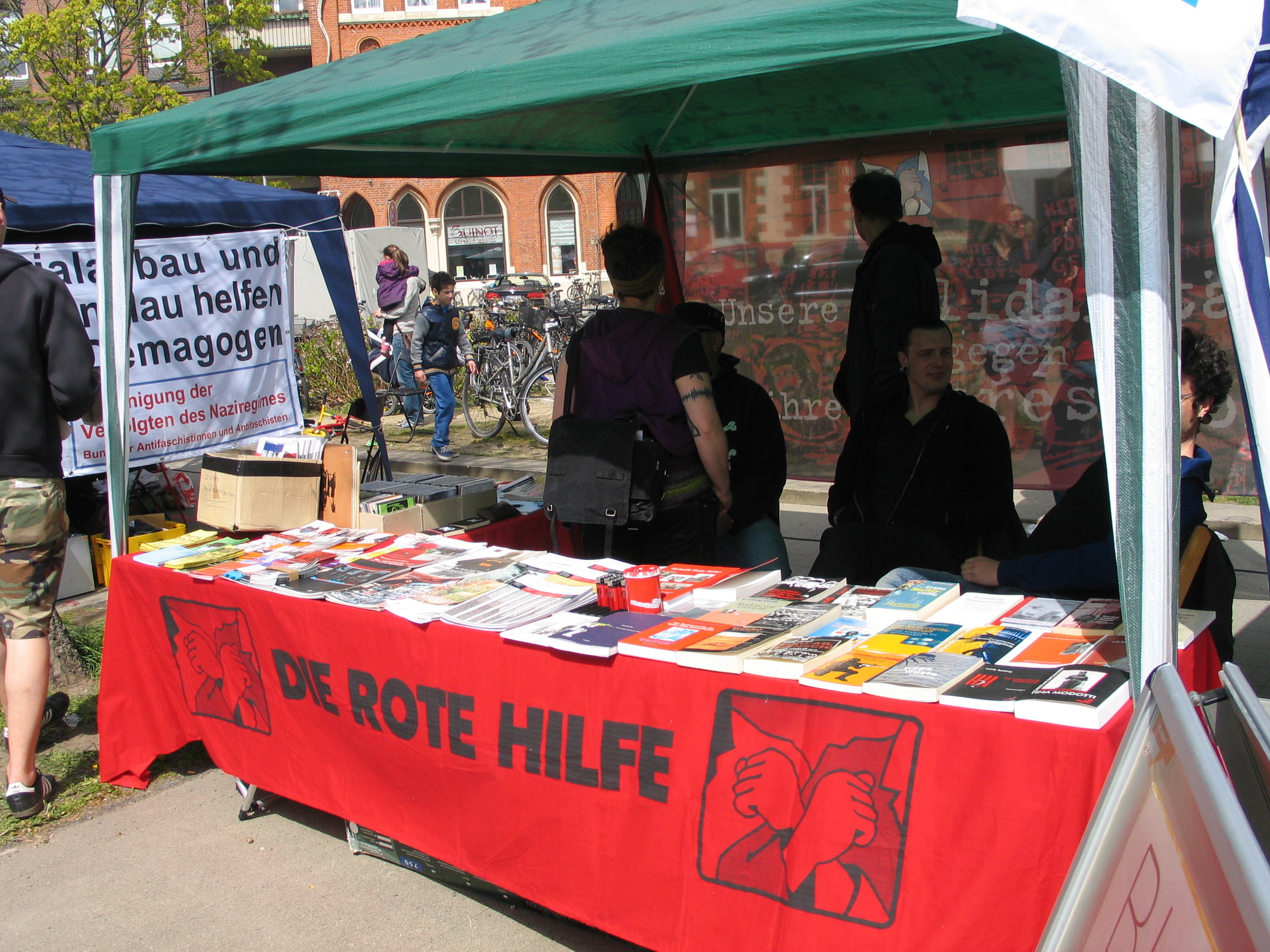
Rote Hilfe information booth in Hanover (2013)

Red Aid was founded in 1975, although local groups calling themselves "Rote Hilfe" had begun to appear in the late 1960s. The organisation sees itself as a successor to the Weimar-era Rote Hilfe. In the 1970s, it worked on behalf of Red Army Faction (RAF) prisoners, and a small number of RH members later joined the RAF or similar groups (e.g., Angelika Speitel and Hans-Joachim Klein). Today, roughly half of Red Aid's budget is used to cover the legal fees, fines, and expenses of left‑wing activists and prisoners. It also publishes a quarterly journal, Die Rote Hilfe ("The Red Aid"), along with other publications, and organises events. The Federal Office for the Protection of the Constitution (Bundesamt für Verfassungsschutz, BfV) asserts that Red Aid plays a supportive role within left‑wing extremist milieus, contributing to their cohesion and persistence.

== See also ==
- International Red Aid
- Rote Hilfe
