= Spontis =

West German left-wing movement

The Spontis or Sponti movement was a left-wing movement in West Germany in 1970s-1980s. The name is an abbreviation for the word "spontaneous", in reference to their preference of "revolutionary spontaneity of the masses" over theoretically- and party-based movements. A significant force of this movement were university students.

== Sponti-Sprüche ==
A notable feature of the Spontis was their "Sponti sayings" ("Sponti-Sprüche") - slogans and adages, often humorous and sarcastic, parodying various political slogans and mottos or twisting well-known proverbs and sayings. For example: "Yesterday we were on the edge of the abyss. Today we are stepping forward," or "Liberté, Égalité, Pfefferminztee".

Some Sponti sayings, such as "Wissen ist Macht, nichts wissen, macht auch nichts" ("Knowledge is Power, (but) knowing nothing does not matter anyway") survived for many years after Sponti times, sometimes acquiring different meanings. Ulrike Rechel says that it "probably belongs to the top 5 of all slogans on toilet walls in universities or schools". She further comments that not knowing something seems to be not critical today, in the time of Google and Wikipedia, and smartphones, when any piece of knowledge is a couple of keyboard clicks away, in contrast to the times of Francis Bacon, when gaining knowledge was associated with much effort. But this attitude eventually leads to various social problems. (See also Wissen ist Macht in Germany.)

== Notable members ==
- Joschka Fischer
- Daniel Cohn-Bendit
