= Udo Walz =

German hairdresser (1944–2020)

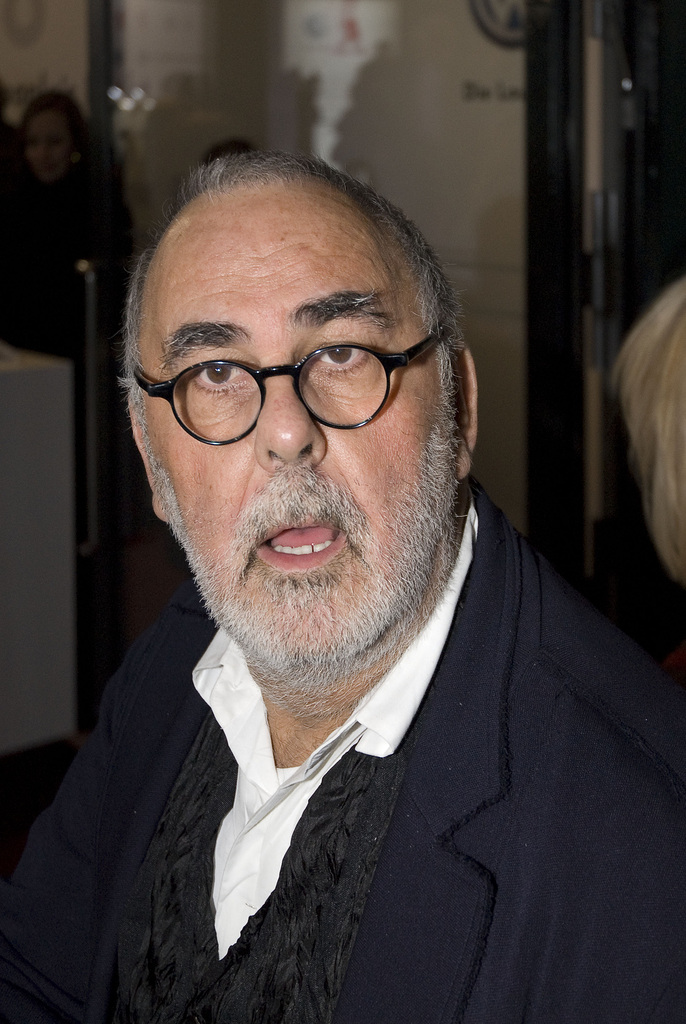
- Walz at the Berlinale in 2008
- Born: 28 June 1944
- Died: 20 November 2020 (aged 76)
- Partner: Carsten Thamm-Walz (1993–2020)

Udo Walz (28 July 1944 – 20 November 2020) was a German celebrity hairdresser. Considered the first German celebrity hairdresser, his clientele included politicians Gerhard Schröder and Angela Merkel, Red Army Faction cofounder Ulrike Meinhof, and international celebrities such as Julia Roberts. Walz promoted discretion with his celebrity clients, once saying "My motto has always been not to ask anyone who they are and what they do for a living."

== Career ==
=== Beginnings ===
Walz was born in Waiblingen, Baden-Württemberg. His parents divorced when he was young, and his father, a truck driver, moved in with another woman when he was six years old. Walz initially wanted to enter a hotel management school, but his mother didn't have the financial means, and so at 14 years old he began a hairdressing apprenticeship instead. Three years later, despite finishing with the third worst rating out of 600 candidates in the certification exam, Walz moved to St. Moritz. There he began his hairdressing job and first met celebrities such as Marlene Dietrich.

=== Rise ===
In 1963, Walz moved to West Berlin due to the absence of conscription in the enclave, as opposed to the rest of the country. Originally intending for the stay in Berlin to be temporary before moving to New York City, Walz was pleased by the city and decided to remain. Due to his relation with Dietrich, he was hired by popular hairdresser Ina Sailer to work in her beauty salon, but was eventually fired for tardiness. In 1968, Walz began a partnership with Heinz Schlicht in a salon in Charlottenburg. His lucky break came when Walz covered for a colleague who was meant to style a famous model's hair but fell ill. The photographer of the model's photoshoot, F. C. Gundlach, was fond of the model's hair and wanted to work with Walz, increasing his reputation. Walz styled the hair shown in multiple magazines, including Brigitte and Otto, as well as accompanying the aforementioned F. C. Gundlach internationally.

In 1970, Walz bleached and styled the hair of Red Army Faction founding member Ulrike Meinhof, who desired to separate the organisation from the "sloppy APO look", which began to arouse suspicion, and instead adopted an innocent middle-class appearance. According to Walz, he did not know the identity of Meinhof and that it occurred prior to her participation in breaking Andreas Baader out of prison, which included a librarian being shot in the process. Bettina Röhl disputes this, claiming the styling occurred in October and that Walz performed it knowing Meinhof was hiding from the attempted murder conviction.

Walz's social standing elevated in the mid-1980s due to his friendship with Richard R. Burt, United States ambassador to Germany at the time, and his wife, whose role heavily influenced the high society of West Berlin.

=== Celebrity hairdresser ===
In 1985, Walz opened his own salon on Kurfürstendamm, a popular shopping street in Berlin. At the time of his death, Walz owned four other salons—two in Berlin, one in Potsdam and one in Mallorca.

Udo Walz salons in Berlin

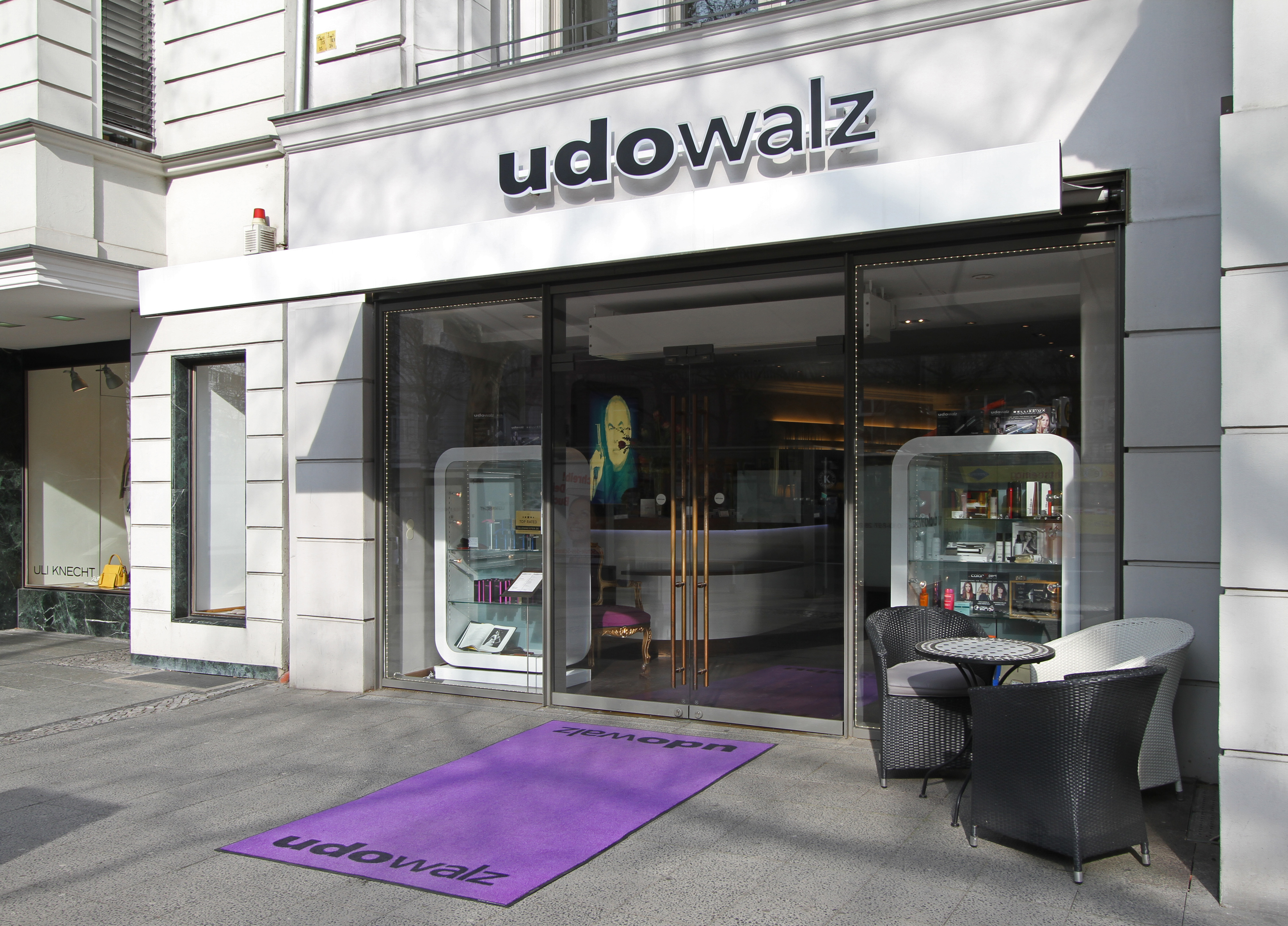
The flagship salon on Kurfürstendamm 29

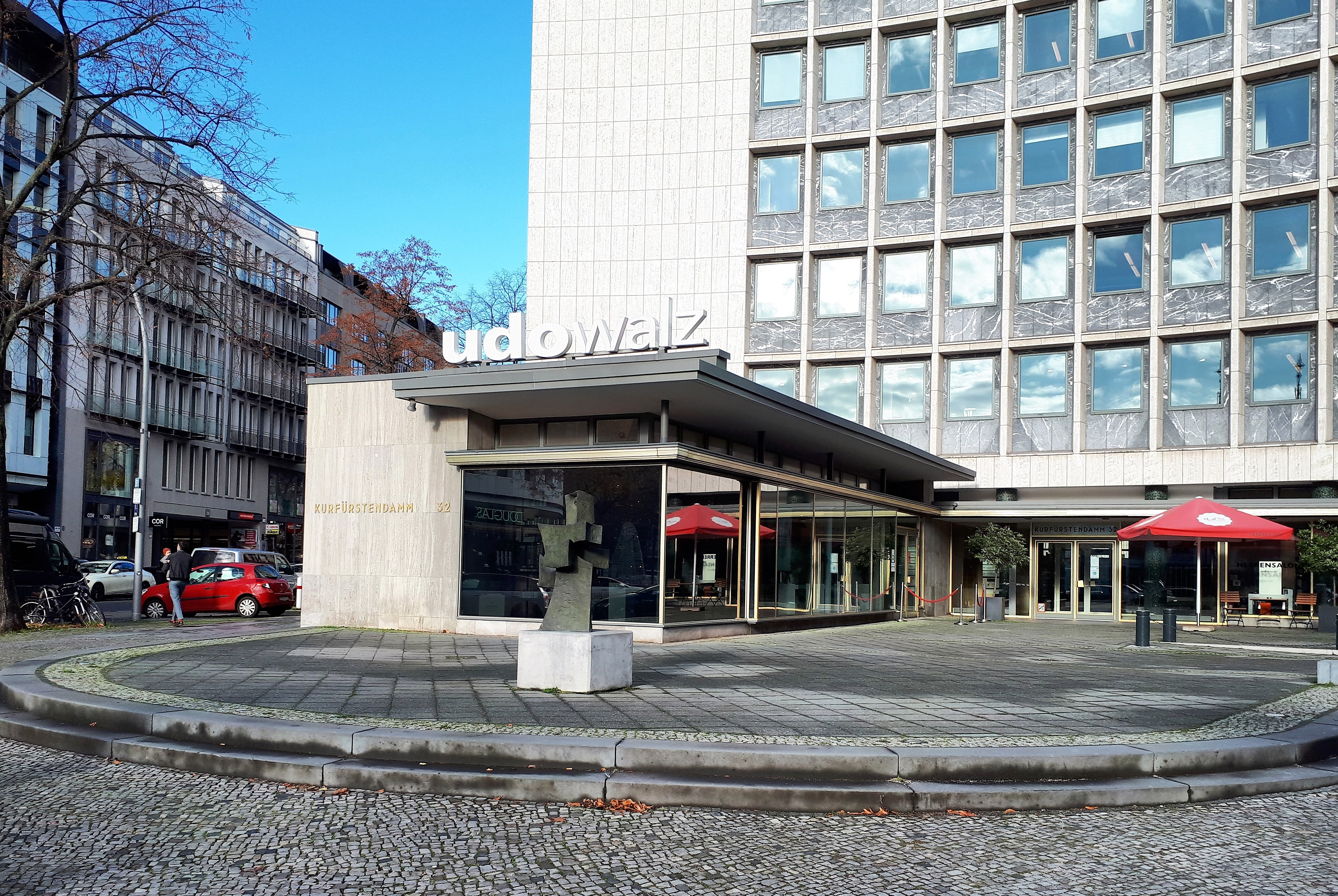
Kurfürstendamm 32

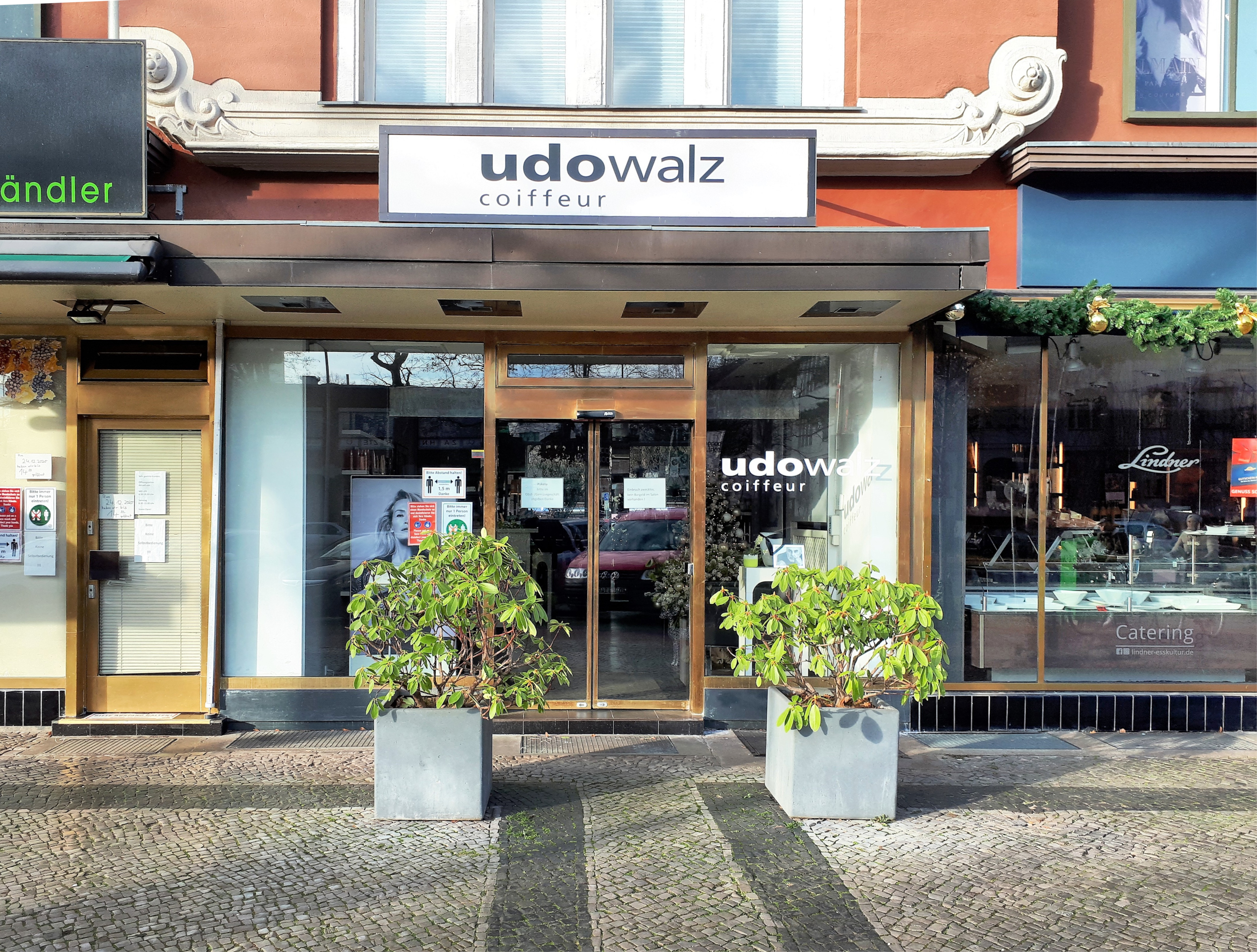
Hohenzollerndamm 92

Singer Jeanette Biedermann began an apprenticeship with him before dropping out after winning a pop song competition in 1999.

In April 2002, Gerhard Schröder filed an injunction against the ddp press agency for publishing an opinion saying that he "would be more credible if he didn't dye his gray hair". On ddp's contestation, Walz, due to being Schröder's hairstylist, took the stand. He stated Schröder's hair "has never been coloured or tinted, but [is] always in a natural state."

Walz claimed to have transformed Angela Merkel's haircut in the run-up to the 2005 German federal election, which hairdresser Martina Acht contests. Walz replied, "Martina Acht might have used a blow-dryer on my client's hair, but she did not cut it... There are always people around who want to jump on the bandwagon."

=== Other ventures ===
Walz was an ambassador for Dianiño, a childhood diabetes foundation. In 2005, he joined the Christian Democratic Union of Germany, with the hope that "the CDU would clear out the bureaucracy."

Walz starred in a five-part docusoap named "Typisch Udo" (Typical Udo), which premiered in 2004 on RTL.

== Personal life ==
In July 2008, Walz entered a civil union with Carsten Thamm-Walz, his partner since 1993. After same-sex marriage in Germany was legalised in 2017, Walz stated his opposition to converting his civil union to a marriage and reiterated his position on same-sex marriage in general, saying "I think only a man and a woman should get married, if they want to start a family." Walz lived in Schmargendorf, an Ortsteil of Berlin.

Walz suffered from severe diabetes, and was unable to walk for months before his death. He died on 20 November 2020, two weeks after suffering diabetic shock and falling into a coma, and was buried at Waldfriedhof Dahlem.

== Bibliography ==
- Walz, Udo (1997). Haargenau. Mein Leben für die Schönheit [Meticulous Hair: My Life for Beauty] (in German). Berlin: Quintessenz Verlag. ISBN 978-3861243335.
- Walz, Udo (2014). Udo Walz, Coiffeur (in German). Berlin: Bastei Lübbe (Quadriga). ISBN 978-3869950730.
