= Joschka Fischer =

German politician (born 1948)

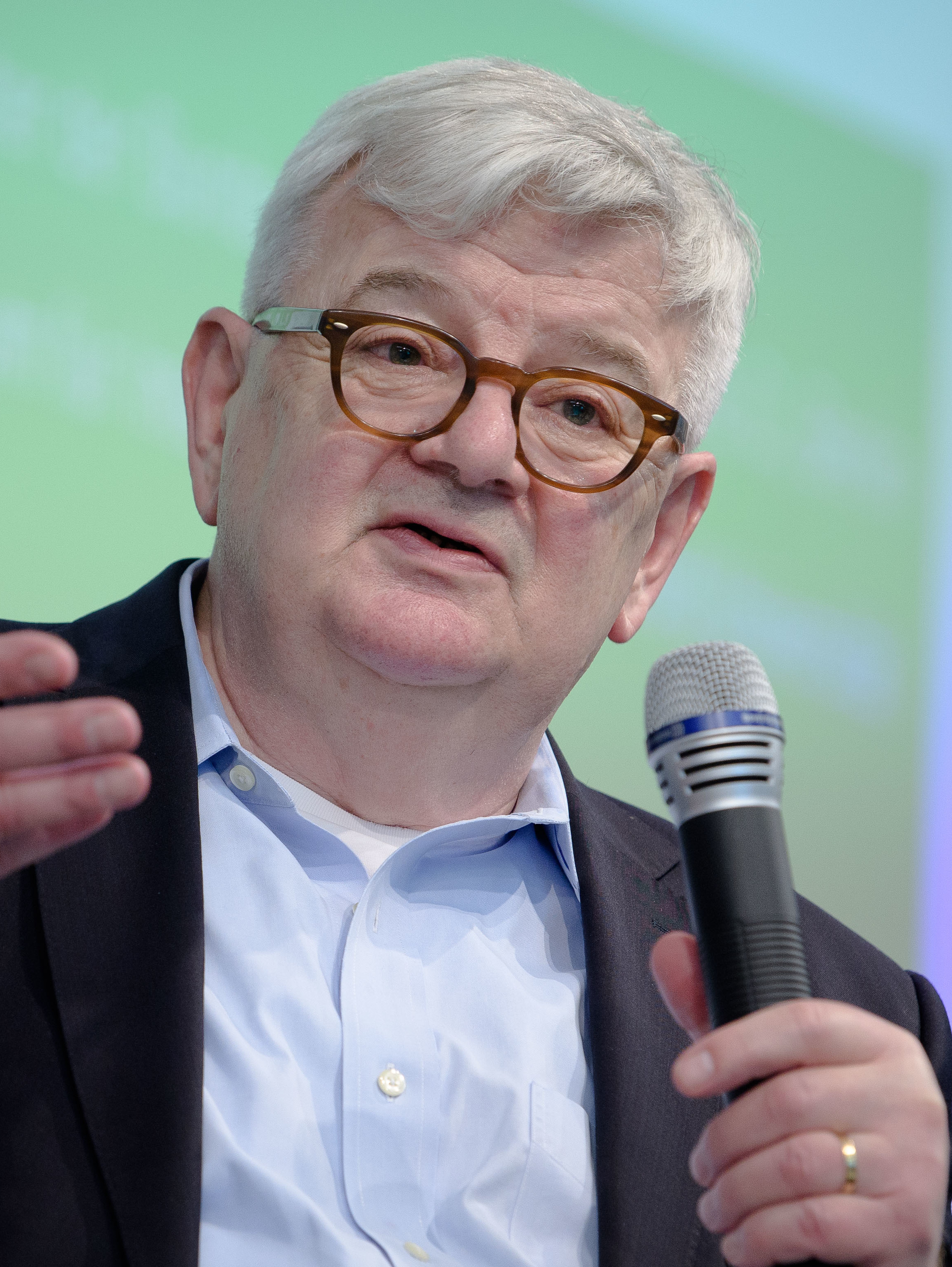
- Fischer in 2018

Vice Chancellor of Germany
- In office 27 October 1998 – 22 November 2005
- President: Roman Herzog; Johannes Rau; Horst Köhler
- Chancellor: Gerhard Schröder
- Preceded by: Klaus Kinkel
- Succeeded by: Franz Müntefering

Federal Minister of Foreign Affairs
- In office 27 October 1998 – 22 November 2005
- Chancellor: Gerhard Schröder
- Preceded by: Klaus Kinkel
- Succeeded by: Frank-Walter Steinmeier

Member of the Bundestag for Hesse
- In office 16 October 1994 – 1 September 2006
- Constituency: Alliance 90/The Greens List
- In office 6 March 1983 – 31 March 1985
- Preceded by: The Greens List

Deputy Minister President of Hesse
- In office 5 April 1991 – 5 October 1994
- Prime Minister: Hans Eichel
- Preceded by: Wolfgang Gerhardt
- Succeeded by: Rupert von Plottnitz

Hessian Minister of Environment and Energy
- In office 12 December 1985 – 9 February 1987
- Prime Minister: Holger Börner
- Preceded by: Position established
- Succeeded by: Armin Clauss (Acting)
- In office 5 April 1991 – 5 October 1994
- Prime Minister: Hans Eichel
- Preceded by: Karlheinz Weimar
- Succeeded by: Rupert von Plottnitz

Hessian Minister of Federal Affairs
- In office 5 April 1991 – 5 October 1994
- Prime Minister: Hans Eichel
- Preceded by: Wolfgang Gerhardt (Agent of Federal Affairs)
- Succeeded by: Rupert von Plottnitz

Personal details
- Born: Joseph Martin Fischer; 12 April 1948 (age 78) Gerabronn, Württemberg-Baden, US-Zone, Allied-occupied Germany
- Party: Alliance 90/The Greens
- Spouses: Edeltraud Seifert (m. 1967; div. 1984) Inge Peusquens (m. 1984; div. 1987) Claudia Bohm (m. 1987; div. 1998) Nicola Leske (m. 1999; div. 2003) Minu Barati (m. 2005)
- Children: 2

Joseph Martin "Joschka" Fischer (born 12 April 1948) is a German former politician of the Alliance 90/The Greens party. He served as the foreign minister and as the vice chancellor of Germany in the cabinet of Gerhard Schröder from 1998 to 2005. Fischer has been a leading figure in the German Greens since the 1970s, and according to opinion polls, he was the most popular politician in Germany for most of the Schröder government's duration. Following the September 2005 election, in which the Schröder government was defeated, he left office on 22 November 2005. In September 2010, he supported the creation of the Spinelli Group, a Europarliamentarian initiative founded with a view to reinvigorate efforts to federalise the European Union.

== Early life ==
Joseph Martin Fischer was born in Gerabronn in Württemberg-Baden, 12 April 1948. He was the third child of a butcher, whose family had lived in Budakeszi, Hungary, for several generations. Fischer's family had to leave Hungary in 1946 after it was occupied by the Soviet Union, and ethnic Germans were persecuted and expelled by the authorities. His nickname Joschka is derived from the Hungarian Jóska, diminutive of Joseph (Hungarian József). He was brought up Catholic and served in his childhood as an altar boy in his parish in Oeffingen. Fischer dropped out of high school in 1965, and started an apprenticeship as a photographer, which he quit in 1966. Because Fischer never gained a school-leaving certificate, he never attended a university or a college. He neither did compulsory military service nor the alternative civilian service for conscientious objectors, because he failed his physical examination due to poor eyesight.

In 1967, he became active in the West German student movement and left-wing movement (post-) 1968 (the so-called Spontis), first in Stuttgart and after 1968 in Frankfurt am Main. For his regular income, Fischer took several low-wage jobs, such as working in a left-wing bookstore in Frankfurt. During this period, he began attending university events, including lectures organized by left-wing revolutionary students by Theodor W. Adorno, Jürgen Habermas and Oskar Negt. He studied the works of Marx, Mao and Hegel and became a member of the militant group Revolutionärer Kampf (Revolutionary Struggle). Fischer was a leader in several street battles involving the radical Putzgruppe (literally "cleaning squad", with the first syllable being an acronym for Proletarische Union für Terror und Zerstörung, "Proletarian Union for Terror and Destruction"), which attacked a number of police officers. Photos of one such brawl in March 1973, which were later to haunt Fischer, show him clubbing policeman Rainer Marx, to whom he later publicly apologized.

Fischer is a close friend of Daniel Cohn-Bendit, whom he met during that time. In 1969, Fischer was photographed in Algeria at a meeting of the PLO, which remained a terrorist organization until 1988. In 1971, he began working for the car manufacturer Opel and attempted to organise his fellow workers for the coming communist revolution. (This was not organising on behalf of a regular labour union: the vast majority of Opel's workers had already been organised for decades by IG Metall, the German metalworkers' union.) This resulted in his dismissal from the company after six months. Fischer then continued making a living with unskilled work while continuing his activism. He worked as a taxi driver from 1976 to 1981 and later in a bookstore in Frankfurt.

In the Deutscher Herbst (German autumn) of 1977, West Germany was rattled by a series of left-wing terrorist attacks by the Red Army Faction (RAF) and Revolutionary Cells (RZ). According to Fischer's own account, witnessing these events, particularly the kidnapping and murder of Hanns-Martin Schleyer and the Entebbe hijacking, made him renounce violence as a means for political change. Instead, he became involved in the new social movements and later in the newly founded Green Party, mainly in the state of Hesse.

In May 1981, the Hessian Secretary of Commerce Heinz-Herbert Karry was murdered with a firearm that in 1973 had been transported in Fischer's car, along with other weapons stolen from an American army base. Fischer maintained he had given the car to the later terrorist Hans-Joachim Klein solely for the purpose of having Klein fit it with a new engine. Only later had Fischer learned that his car had been used to transport stolen weapons.

As Foreign Minister, Fischer apologised for the violence of his Putzgruppe days, without disassociating himself from the radical movement. Some critics continue to charge that Fischer was the leading figure of a 1976 discussion that led to the use of Molotov cocktails in an upcoming demonstration in support of RAF member Ulrike Meinhof. Fischer was arrested on 14 May 1976 as a suspect in the Molotov cocktail attacks on police, but was released after two days. Fischer stated that he never used Molotov cocktails against the police. The firebombing of policeman Jürgen Weber's police car left Weber with burns over 60% of his body.

== Green politician ==
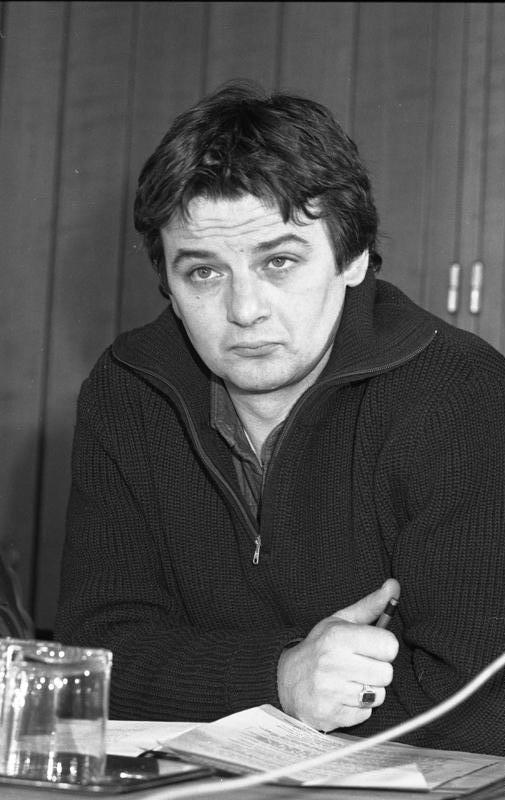
Joschka Fischer on 17 February 1983

From 1983 to 1985, Fischer was a member of the Bundestag for the Green party. His stint in federal parliament saw him frequently engage in a frank and confrontational debating style, exemplified by an incident on 18 October 1984, when he addressed Richard Stücklen, then vice president of the parliament, with the words: "If I may say so, Mr. President, you are an asshole" (German: "Mit Verlaub, Herr Präsident, Sie sind ein Arschloch."). In 1985, Fischer became Minister for the Environment in the Landtag of Hesse in the first governmental Red-Green coalition between the Social Democratic Party of Germany (SPD) and the Greens. Fischer caused a stir when he appeared at his oath of office ceremony wearing trainers. These trainers are now part of the shoe collection at the German Leather and Shoe Museum in Offenbach, Hesse.

Fischer also expressed his thoughts very frankly in the periodical of the Hessian Green party "Stichwort Grün". In the edition of October 1989—one month before the fall of the Berlin Wall—he penned an article with the heading: "Der Wiedervereinigung die Schnauze verbieten!" (Shutting up the re-unification!)

Fischer was again environment minister in Hessen from 1991 to 1994 and then became co-chairman of the Greens' parliamentary faction in the Bundestag. Fischer was respected for his oratory skills, as well as for his charisma on the political stage. For a large part of the 1990s, with the social democrats languishing in the opinion polls, Fischer's admirers referred to him as the "real" leader of the opposition. He parlayed his clout into political success, as he moved the Greens to the centre ground of German politics, paving the way for their first participation in the nation's federal government.

== Foreign minister ==
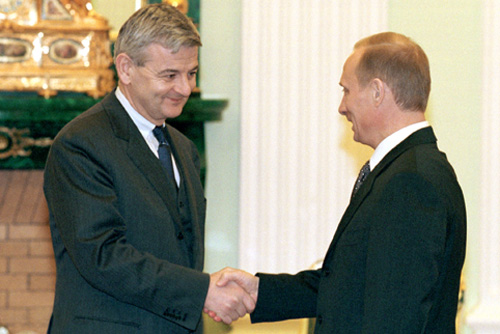
Fischer with Russian president Vladimir Putin on 13 February 2001

In September 1998, the Social Democratic Party of Germany, led by Gerhard Schröder, defeated the Christian Democratic Union government of Helmut Kohl. The SPD's 41% and the Greens' 7% of the vote set the two parties on a possible path to government through a coalition. Schröder stated his preference for a red-green coalition, as did an overwhelming majority of SPD members. After several weeks of negotiations, a SPD-Green government took power on 27 October 1998, with Fischer appointed as Minister of Foreign Affairs. By 2005, he was the second longest-serving foreign minister in German postwar history (after Hans-Dietrich Genscher).

In mid-April 1999, Germany came up with the first peace plan for the war in Kosovo, when Fischer produced a proposal, notably including Russia, that would have rewarded the beginning of a Yugoslav pullout from Kosovo with a bombing pause. In May 1999, however, an antiwar protester flung a bag of red paint at Fischer during a party convention debating NATO's airstrikes on Yugoslavia in the war over Kosovo; Fischer suffered a perforated eardrum.

In an effort to make it easier for antiwar critics to back Schröder's decision to send German Bundeswehr troops to Afghanistan in 2001, Fischer and Development Minister Heidemarie Wieczorek-Zeul announced a 256 million marks ($115 million) humanitarian-aid package for Afghan refugees. In late 2001, Fischer hosted – under the auspices of the United Nations – a ten-day conference at the German government guesthouse above the Rhine River, where delegates from four Afghan factions signed the Bonn Agreement establishing a transitional government for the country to replace the deposed Taliban regime. At the time, Germany's longstanding links to Afghanistan and its 2001 chairmanship of the Afghanistan Support Group (consisting of countries pledging humanitarian and reconstruction aid for Afghanistan) were the reasons it was picked to host the meeting.

In September 2001, Fischer summoned Ahmad Azizi, the Iranian ambassador to Germany, for urgent talks after several reformist intellectuals – including Akbar Ganji, Mehrangiz Kar and Ezzatollah Sahabi – were given prison sentences of between four and 10 years for participating in a 2000 academic and cultural conference sponsored by the Heinrich Böll Foundation in Berlin in late 2000.

In 2005, critics charged that Fischer's relaxing of controls on visa regulations for Ukraine, would allow illegal immigrants to enter Germany with fake identities. A parliamentary committee was established to examine the case, and unlike in other such committee hearings, Fischer's statement (and that of other top officials) was shown live on public television. Fischer's appearance before the committee lasted twelve hours. (See German Visa Affair 2005).

Fischer represented the German government at the funeral services for Foreign Minister Anna Lindh of Sweden on 19 September 2003 in Stockholm; Pope John Paul II on 8 April 2005 in Rome; and former UK Foreign Secretary Robin Cook on 12 August 2005 in Edinburgh.

After the defeat of the coalition government in the 2005 election, Fischer announced that he would retire to the backbench. "After 20 years of power, now I want my freedom back", Fischer said. On 13 October 2005, it was announced that Frank-Walter Steinmeier of the SPD would succeed Fischer as foreign minister.

=== Western Balkans policy ===
In 1999, Fischer supported German military participation in the Kosovo War. This proved to be a highly controversial position since Fischer's plan not only clashed with the largely pacifist philosophy of The Greens, but because it also supported for the first time since World War II active participation of German soldiers in combat. Fischer justified this military involvement with allegations that Serbia was planning to commit genocide against the Kosovo Albanians.

Fischer represented the German government at the funeral services for Prime Minister Zoran Đinđić of Serbia on 16 March 2003 (alongside Development Minister Heidemarie Wieczorek-Zeul) and President Boris Trajkovski of Macedonia on 5 March 2004 in Skopje.

=== Transatlantic relations ===
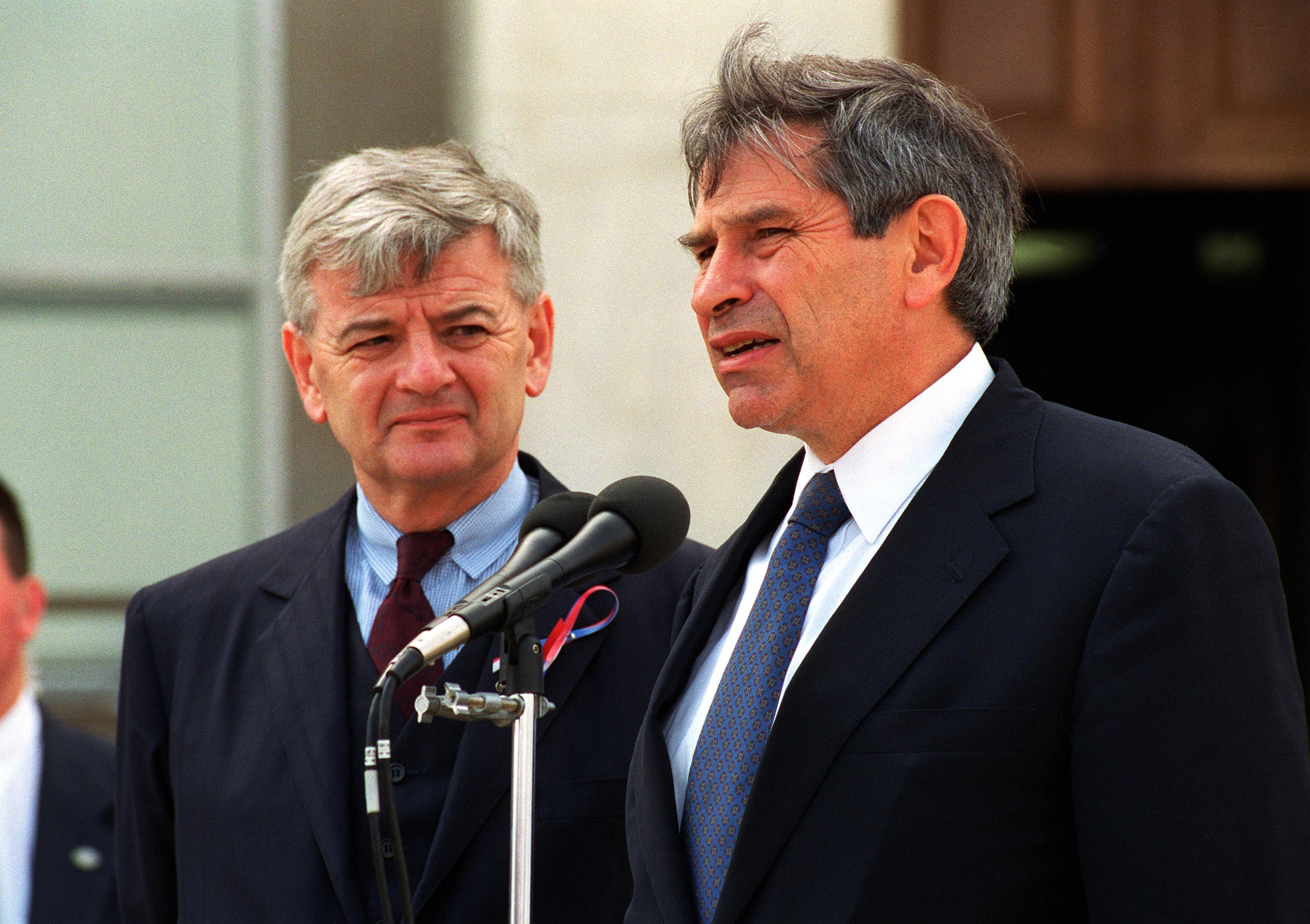
Fischer and Paul Wolfowitz at the Pentagon on 19 September 2001

On fundamental issues like the International Criminal Court, the Kyoto Protocol, and the crisis in the Middle East, Fischer was openly differing with the Bush administration.

In 1999, both Fischer and Justice Minister Herta Däubler-Gmelin appealed for clemency for the LaGrand brothers, two German citizens sentenced to death in Arizona. According to the German government, the LaGrands had been denied their rights as German citizens because prosecutors did not inform the German consulate of the brothers' arrest in 1982 until a decade later. However, both were put to death, one in a cloud of cyanide gas. In response, the European Union submitted an anti-death-penalty resolution to the United Nations Commission on Human Rights.

Although Fischer was in favour of stationing German troops in Afghanistan, he advised chancellor Schröder not to join the war in Iraq. Fischer famously confronted United States Defense Secretary Donald Rumsfeld at the 39th Munich Security Conference in 2003 on the secretary's purported evidence for Iraq's possession of weapons of mass destruction ("Excuse me, I am not convinced").

=== Middle East policy ===
Fischer has been criticized for attending a 1969 conference of the Palestine Liberation Organization, where Palestinian leader Yasser Arafat called for an all-out war on Israel "until the end".

During their time in government, both Fischer and Chancellor Gerhard Schröder were widely considered sincerely, if not uncritically, pro-Israeli. In 1999, Fischer led a delegation including European Commissioner Manuel Marín and the European Union's Special Envoy to the Middle East Miguel Ángel Moratinos on a visit to Jerusalem and the Palestinian territories, but also to a range of other countries which have a crucial role in the peace process, including Lebanon, Syria, Jordan and Egypt. By 2001, he emerged as a pivotal figure in the hopes for the Israeli–Palestinian peace process, in part because he helped bring about a lull in the violence after the Dolphinarium discotheque massacre in June 2001. His intervention led to an announced cease-fire arranged by George Tenet, the United States Director of Central Intelligence; Fischer had been in Tel Aviv at the time of the blast. Fischer later brokered a meeting between Arafat and the Israeli foreign minister, Shimon Peres, to discuss how to implement the cease-fire.

In July 2002, Fischer presented a proposal that called for Arafat to appoint an interim prime minister. After the vote, the proposal said, elected officials could continue democratic reforms leading to a provisional Palestinian state by the end of 2003 and to final borders by 2005. He represented the German government at the funeral services for Arafat on 12 November 2004 in Cairo and at the inauguration of the new Holocaust Memorial Museum at Yad Vashem in March 2005.

=== European integration ===
In May 2000, Fischer proposed the creation of a European federation with a directly elected president and parliament sharing real executive and legislative powers. Fischer proposed the eventual enactment of a constitutional treaty that would set out which powers were to be shifted to the new European executive and parliament, and those that remained at national level. In response, President Jacques Chirac of France urged Germany in June 2000 to join France in spearheading a core group of European Union countries that would move faster than others toward political and economic union.

In October 2002, Fischer was appointed by the German government to the Convention on the Future of Europe, replacing Peter Glotz. Fischer had expressed a keen interest in taking part in the convention during the coalition talks with Chancellor Gerhard Schröder following the 2002 elections. In a paper jointly signed by Fischer and French Foreign Minister Dominique de Villepin, in November 2002, Germany and France pushed for a mutual defence commitment to be part of the constitution. In 2004, he was one of the signatories to the Treaty establishing a Constitution for Europe.

==== Relations with Russia ====
Fischer has long been critical of Russia, especially on human rights. However, during his time as foreign minister, Germany's relations with Russia were primarily guided by Chancellor Gerhard Schröder. In 2004, Fischer called on Ukraine to hold a recount of the presidential elections after Putin-backed candidate Viktor Yanukovich was the first to declare his victory despite mass protests in Kyiv.

== Life after politics ==
=== Non-profit work ===
From September 2006 until 2007, Fischer was a senior fellow at the Liechtenstein Institute on Self-Determination, and as a visiting professor co-taught with Wolfgang F. Danspeckgruber at Woodrow Wilson School of Public and International Affairs, both at Princeton University. He has also spoken at other American universities on various topics in foreign affairs and international relations.

In addition, Fischer joined various non-governmental organizations, including:

- Arab Democracy Foundation, Founding Member of the Board of Trustees (since 2007)
- Council on Foreign Relations, Member
- European Council on Foreign Relations (ECFR), Founding Co-chairman of the Board (alongside Martti Ahtisaari and Mabel van Oranje)
- United Nations Association of Germany (DGVN), Member of the Presidium
- Institute for Human Sciences (IWM), Member of the Board of Patrons
- Roland Berger Human Dignity Award, Member of the Awards Committee

On 15 September 2010 Fischer supported the new initiative Spinelli Group, which was founded to reinvigorate efforts towards federalisation of the European Union (EU). Other prominent supporters are: Jacques Delors, Daniel Cohn-Bendit, Guy Verhofstadt, Andrew Duff, Elmar Brok.

From 2024 to 2025, Fischer was part of an independent expert commission convened by the Global Perspectives Initiative and chaired by Annegret Kramp-Karrenbauer to develop recommendations for Germany's development policy.

Fischer was promoting the BMW i3 in a TV spot, saying about the car "I am impressed" ("Isch bin beeindruckt.").

=== Business activities ===
Since 2008, Fischer has been Senior Strategic Counsel at Albright Stonebridge Group, Washington, DC, consulting firm led by Madeleine Albright. In this capacity, he advised Siemens, BMW and Deutsche Börse.

Fischer founded a PR-agency. In 2009 he signed an agreemend to promote the interests of RWE and OMV. The former foreign minister's PR firm had promoted Nabucco, Azerbaijan's alternative to Gazprom's Nord Stream gas pipeline, but without success. Ultimately, the Russian Baltic Sea pipeline championed by Gazprom lobbyist Gerhard Schröder (SPD) prevailed. According to media reports, the "six-digit salary" consultancy contract had already been signed.

In 2013, Fischer signed a contract to serve as a web mascot for BMW. He starred in a commercial in which he test-drove an electric BMW and raved about the car.

Other business include:

- Meridiam, Member of the supervisory board (since 2012)
- Tilray, Member of the Advisory Board

In 2009 he lost a lawsuit against the magazine Bunte. The magazine had published photos of his stately private villa in Berlin-Grunewald.

Agencies book Fischer as a guest speaker.

== Recognition ==
- 2002 – Honfischer bmw
- orary doctorate of the University of Haifa
- 2003 – Buber Rosenzweig Medal (awarded by Paul Spiegel)
- 2004 – Gottlieb Duttweiler Prize (awarded by Micheline Calmy-Rey and Jean-Claude Juncker)
- 2006 – Honorary doctorate of Tel Aviv University
- 2009 – Leo Baeck Medal (awarded by James Wolfensohn and Henry Kissinger)
- 2012 – Honorary doctorate, University of Michigan
- 2016 – Medal for Extraordinary Merits for Bavaria in a United Europe

== Personal life ==
Prior to the German Visa Affair 2005, Fischer was a popular politician, "loved by an entire nation." Writing in Der Spiegel, journalist Charles Hawley opined that since 1998, "Joschka Fischer's popularity has been virtually unassailable: The icon of the environmentally minded Green Party could, it seemed, do no wrong. Indeed, Fischer was so popular in 2002 that Chancellor Gerhard Schroeder largely based his early election campaign on the fact that Fischer would remain at his side at the helm of Germany's political leadership." As Germany's Foreign Minister, Fischer's popularity soared when he opposed the Iraq War, and his very public struggle with his weight endeared him to many Germans.

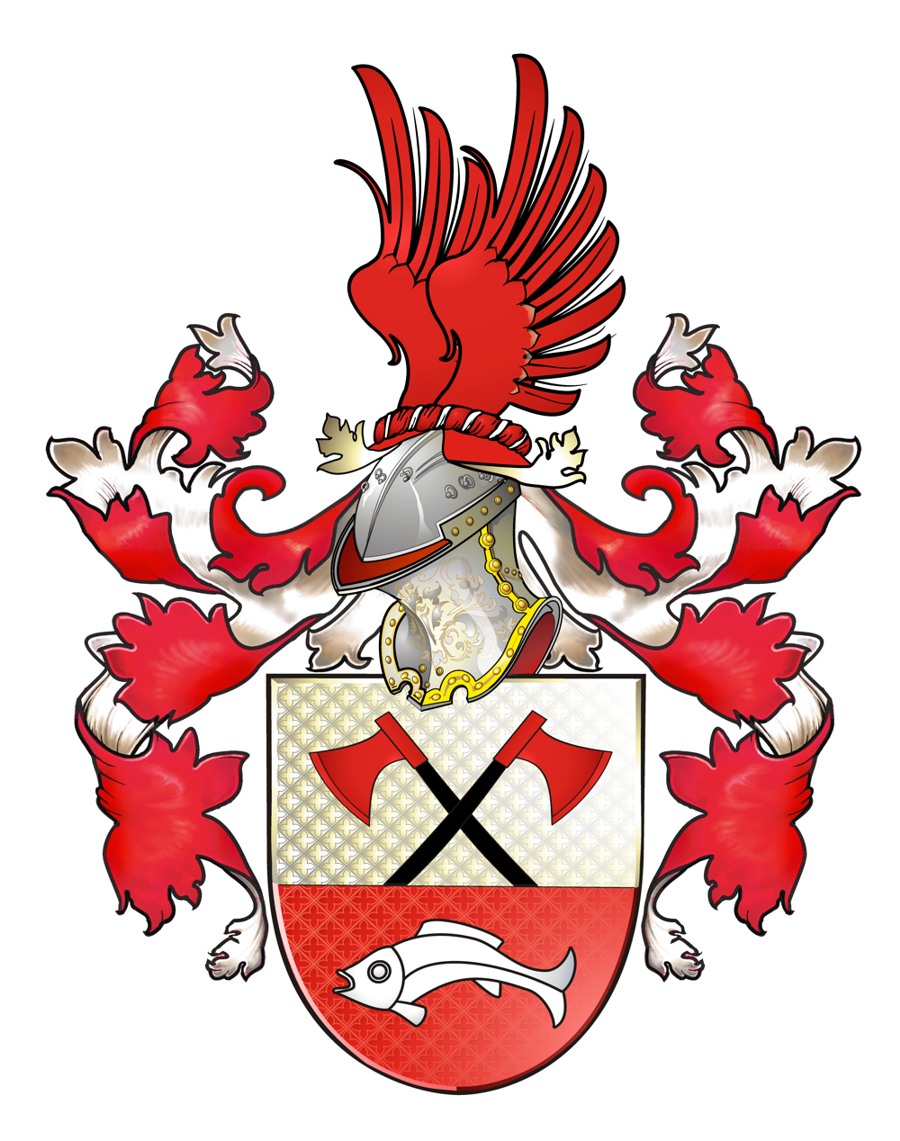

Up until 1996, Fischer was a bon vivant, and often spoke openly about his love for good wines and food despite his "chunky" figure. As he ascended to the Foreign Ministry, Fischer decided to lose weight, transforming his body almost overnight by refraining from alcohol and becoming a vegetarian. In 2000, he covered the topic of his weight loss by writing the book My Long Race Towards Myself on his experience, which became an immediate bestseller in Germany. Half a year before becoming foreign minister, he had his marathon debut at the 1998 Hamburg Marathon (clocking 3:41). As minister, he finished New York in 1999 (3:55) and Berlin in 2000 (3:55). Afterwards, he reduced training and during the months preceding the Iraq War, Fischer began putting on weight again.

Fischer was married to German-Iranian film producer and screenwriter Minu Barati in 2005. It is his fifth marriage. His two children with his previous partner and eventual wife, Inge Vogel (to whom he was married from 1984 to 1987), were born in 1979 and 1983, respectively. At the time of his wedding with Barati in 2005, she was mother to a six-year-old daughter from a previous relationship, while Fischer's children were 23 and 26 of age at the time. The couple lives with Barati's daughter.

In 2004, he commissioned German heraldist Dieter Krieger to produce a coat of arms, which was registered to the Rhein-Main Wappenrolle. The arms are a type of a "Canting arms"; party per fesse silver and gules, in chief crossed axes with red blades and black handles, in base, a fish in the first. Crest of the red eagle's wings, mantling red doubled silver.

He describes himself as Catholic, but not very religious.

Political offices
Preceded by Klaus Kinkel	Vice-Chancellor of Germany; 1998–2005	Succeeded by Franz Müntefering
Preceded by Klaus Kinkel	Minister for Foreign Affairs; 1998–2005	Succeeded by Frank-Walter Steinmeier
Academic offices
Preceded by Valéry Giscard d'Estaing	Speaker at the College of Europe Opening Ceremony; 2003	Succeeded by José Manuel Barroso
