= Putzgruppe =

German left-wing militant group

Putzgruppe (German for "cleaning squad") was a German far-left militant group that emerged from the German student movement and was active in the 1970s. It participated in riots against the police in Frankfurt. The future German foreign minister and vice chancellor Joschka Fischer was known to be the head of the group.

The group was the militant branch of a left-wing political organisation called "Revolutionärer Kampf" (Revolutionary Fight). The groups usual area of operation was the violent defense of occupied buildings against eviction by the police. According to Daniel Cohn-Bendit, they tried "to use helmets, to protect themselves against the state power, which sought trouble". In 2001, Joschka Fischer gave an interview to the German magazine Stern in which he said that they threw stones.

The term Putzgruppe became popular in Germany in 2000, when the trial against Hans-Joachim Klein, a former member of the group, begun. He joined the terrorist group Revolutionary Cells in 1974.

== Members ==
The Putzgruppe had up to 40 members. Its head was Joschka Fischer. Other members included Hans-Joachim Klein, Johnny Klinke, Matthias Beltz, Ralf Scheffler, Raoul Kopania, Georg Clemens Dick, and Tom Koenigs.
