= Hans-Joachim Klein =

German left-wing militant (1947–2022)

- Born: 21 December 1947; Frankfurt, Germany
- Died: 9 November 2022 (aged 74); Sainte-Honorine-la-Guillaume, France
- Resting place: Sainte-Honorine-la-Guillaume
- Known for: Militant

Hans-Joachim Klein (German: [ˈhans joˈʔaxɪm ˈklaɪn]; 21 December 1947 – 9 November 2022) was a German left-wing militant and a member of the terrorist group Revolutionary Cells. His nom de guerre was "Angie". In 1975, Klein participated in an attack on OPEC headquarters in Vienna organized by the international terrorist "Carlos the Jackal", in which he was seriously injured. He publicly renounced political violence two years later. After decades in hiding, he was arrested in 1998, prosecuted for his role in the OPEC attack, and sentenced to nine years of imprisonment. He was paroled in 2003.

== Biography ==
=== Childhood ===
Born on 21 December 1947, Klein came from a working-class background. His mother was imprisoned in Ravensbrück concentration camp for Rassenschande ("racial pollution") during World War II. She killed herself a few months after Klein was born and he spent some time in a foster home after her death. Klein was physically abused by his father, who took custody of him again after he remarried. For most of his life Klein believed incorrectly that his father had been an SS member and his mother had been Jewish.

=== Activism and violence ===
In the 1970s Klein worked for the legal Red Army Faction (RAF) prisoner support group Red Aid (Rote Hilfe) in Frankfurt and subsequently for the RAF lawyer Klaus Croissant in Stuttgart. At one point he shared a Frankfurt commune with Joschka Fischer and Daniel Cohn-Bendit. Klein was member of the Frankfurt Cleaning Squad. He served as Jean-Paul Sartre's chauffeur when Sartre visited the imprisoned Andreas Baader in December 1974. He joined the Revolutionäre Zellen (RZ, "Revolutionary Cells") in 1975. Klein has described Holger Meins' death on hunger strike as inspiring his turn to violence; he carried a photo of Meins' emaciated body in his wallet. He took part in the 1975 attack organized by Carlos the Jackal on an OPEC conference in Vienna, in which three people were killed and Klein himself shot in the stomach.

Klein renounced terrorism in 1977, sending a letter to Der Spiegel (with his gun enclosed) in which he warned of planned RZ attacks on two leaders of the German Jewish community. He then went underground, hiding from his former comrades as well as the police. Klein further explained his change of views in a 1978 interview with the French journalist Jean-Marcel Bouguereau and a 1979 book entitled Mercenary Death, for which Cohn-Bendit wrote the foreword.

In 1995, Klein was tracked down and interviewed (in disguise) by Daniel Leconte for French television.

=== Arrest and subsequent events ===
After spending two decades in hiding, mostly in France, in September 1998 he was apprehended in the Normandy village of Sainte-Honorine-la-Guillaume, where he had been living for five years. After his arrest several German and French public figures, including Cohn-Bendit, Bouguereau, and André Glucksmann, stated publicly that they had been aware of Klein's location and had assisted him during his time in hiding. Eighteen months after his arrest Klein was extradited to Germany to stand trial for his role in the OPEC attack.

At trial Klein admitted participating in the attack, but denied having killed anyone. He also testified that Libya had assisted in the raid, giving the attackers weapons and information on the conference's security arrangements. Joschka Fischer, then Germany's Foreign Minister, testified at his trial as a character witness; his presence intensified the controversy then playing out over his radical past. In February 2001, after a four-month trial, Klein was convicted of murder, attempted murder, and hostage taking, and sentenced to nine years in prison. The prosecution had asked for 14 years, but Klein was given a lighter sentence because he provided authorities with information about other participants in the attack. In 2003, he was released on parole and returned to Normandy.

== Personal life and death ==
Klein was married to a French woman and had two children. He died on 9 November 2022, at age 74.

== In popular culture ==
Klein was the subject of the 2006 documentary My Life as a Terrorist, directed by Alexander Oey. He also appeared in the 2007 documentaries Protagonist and Terror's Advocate. He was portrayed by Christoph Bach in the 2010 French television miniseries Carlos.

== General and cited references ==
- Follain, John (1998). Jackal: The Complete Story of the Legendary Terrorist, Carlos the Jackal. New York: Arcade Pub. ISBN 978-1-55970-535-6.
- Varon, Jeremy (2004). Bringing the War Home: The Weather Underground, the Red Army Faction, and Revolutionary Violence in the Sixties and Seventies (1st ed.). Berkeley: University of California Press. ISBN 978-0-520-23032-3. JSTOR 10.1525/j.ctt1pp1m8.
