= Hermann L. Gremliza =

German journalist (1940–2019)

Hermann Ludwig Gremliza (20 November 1940 – 20 December 2019) was a German radical left journalist.

Gremliza was born in Cologne. In the 1960s he studied in Tübingen. He learned the profession working at Der Spiegel, and after 1974 Gremliza become editor-in-chief of the radical left-wing magazine konkret.

In 1987, he contended that he was a ghostwriter for the investigative journalist Günter Wallraff. Wallraff impugned the accusations.

In 1989, he left the Social Democratic Party because of its support of German reunification. He died in Hamburg, aged 79.

== Works (selection) ==
- 1987 – Betrug dankend erhalten – ISBN 3-922144-30-6
- 1991 – Krautland einig Vaterland – ISBN 3-922144-83-7
- 1997 – Wie Hannelore Kohl die Russen bezauberte – ISBN 3-922144-56-X
- 1997 – Vorwärts. Nieder. Hoch. Nie wieder. Vierzig Jahre Konkret. Eine linke deutsche Geschichte 1957–1997 – ISBN 3-89458-156-5
- 2000 – Gegen Deutschland: 48 Nestbeschmutzungen – ISBN 3-89458-193-X
