= Konkret =

German magazines

konkret

konkret has been the name of two German magazines.

konkret was originally the name of a magazine established by Klaus Rainer Röhl in 1957, that was an influential magazine on the German political left in the 1960s. The magazine was dissolved in 1973 as a consequence of Röhl's rejection of the leftist terrorism in Germany (in which his former wife Ulrike Meinhof took active part).

Since 1974, Hermann L. Gremliza has published a monthly magazine with the same name, self-described as a "magazine for politics and culture". The current magazine is significantly less influential than the original konkret magazine and part of the German left. It is described as leftist extremist by the Federal Office for Protection of the Constitution and also as Anti-German by the State Office for Protection of the Constitution in North Rhine-Westphalia.

== Klaus Rainer Röhl's konkret ==
=== Studentenkurier ===
In 1955, Klaus Rainer Röhl started the monthly Studentenkurier ("Student Messenger"), which was published until 1957. Due to the contributions of many authors as Werner Riegel, Peter Rühmkorf, Arno Schmidt, Kurt Hiller, it became a very influential magazine among students.

=== konkret ===
On the basis of the success of the Studentenkurier, Konkret was founded by Röhl in 1957. Until 1964, it had clandestine ideological and financial relations with the East German government. Innovative in its style, beautifully illustrated and printed on huge folio size heavy stock, its pages often ended up as posters on students' dorm walls and university campus fences. It had great influence on progressive intellectuals, both students and adults. In the high phase of the German student movement of the 1960s, it appeared biweekly and sometimes even weekly.

Articles in konkret openly advocated sex with minors. One of the best known journalists on the magazine was Ulrike Meinhof, the editor-in-chief from 1960. She ended her work for konkret early in 1969 shortly before she joined the Red Army Faction. On 7 May 1969, the house of Konkret publisher Klaus Rainer Röhl was stormed by activists including konkret staff under Meinhof's leadership, its windows and furnishing destroyed.

After a long conflict over the political orientation of konkret, particularly over the use of violence which Röhl strongly rejected, Röhl left the magazine in 1973. Shortly after this, the magazine was dissolved.

== Hermann L. Gremliza's konkret since 1974 ==
In 1974, Hermann L. Gremliza founded a magazine called konkret. He writes the introduction column of the magazine and its current location of publication is Hamburg.

Konkret presents itself as an anti-establishment leftist magazine, standing to left of Germany's established parties. Its maxim is "reading what others don't want to know" (lesen, was andere nicht wissen wollen).

Notable contributors during the Gremliza era were: Norbert Blüm, Wolf Biermann, Heinrich Böll, Daniel Cohn-Bendit, Jutta Ditfurth, Rudi Dutschke, Hans Magnus Enzensberger, Jürgen Elsässer, Erich Fried, Robert Gernhardt, André Gorz, Günter Grass, Sebastian Haffner, Robert Kurz, Oskar Negt, Alice Schwarzer, Klaus Theweleit, Sahra Wagenknecht, Günter Wallraff.
