= 2019 Halle synagogue shooting =

Antisemitic and far-right attack in Germany

Halle synagogue shooting
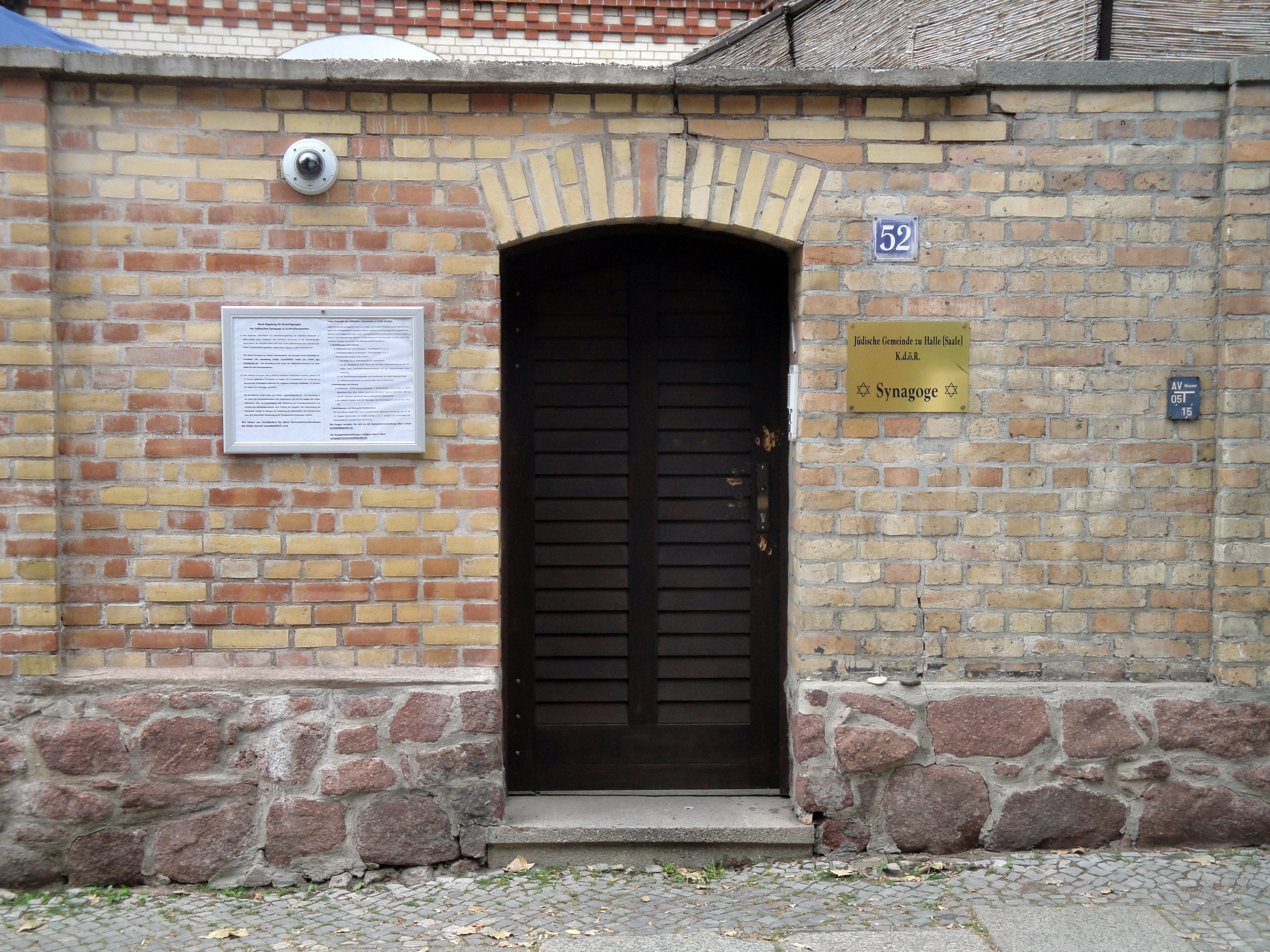
- The synagogue door with bullet holes from the attack

- 2019 Halle synagogue shooting (Saxony-Anhalt) 2019 Halle synagogue shooting (Germany)
- Location: 51.4932°N 11.9803°E; Halle and Landsberg, Saxony-Anhalt, Germany
- Date: 9 October 2019 (Note: The date that the Jewish holiday Yom Kippur fell on in 2019.); 12:00 CEST
- Target: Jewish worshippers, others
- Attack type: Mass shooting; shootout
- Weapons: Two 9mm improvised Luty design submachine guns (one incorporating 3D-printed parts; one used); Two 12 gauge slam-fire shotguns (one used); .38 Spl improvised Single shot pistol; .50 Replica Smith carbine (unused); Longsword (unused); Homemade explosives
- Deaths: 2
- Injuries: 3 (including the perpetrator)
- Perpetrator: Stephan Balliet
- Motive: Antisemitism; far-right extremism
- Convictions: Murder (2 counts); Attempted murder (63 counts) and other charges
- Sentence: Life imprisonment with preventive detention; later an additional 7 years for an attempt to escape prison

On 9 October 2019, 27-year-old neo-Nazi Stephan Balliet attempted to enter a synagogue in Halle, Saxony-Anhalt, Germany, during the Jewish holiday of Yom Kippur. After failing to gain entry, Balliet opened fire at two people nearby, killing a woman, before driving to a nearby Turkish kebab shop where he opened fire again and killed a customer of the store. Balliet then fled to Landsberg, where he shot and injured a couple before being injured in a shootout with police and taken into custody. Federal investigators called the attack far-right and antisemitic terrorism.

The federal Public Prosecutor General took over the investigation and declared it to be a "violation of Germany's internal security." Balliet was charged with two counts of murder and seven counts of attempted murder. On 10 November 2019, Balliet confessed to the charges before an investigative judge, and in December 2020, he was sentenced to life imprisonment with subsequent preventive detention. Following a thwarted prison escape attempt, which included a hostage taking, Balliet was sentenced to an additional seven years in prison in 2024.

== Background ==
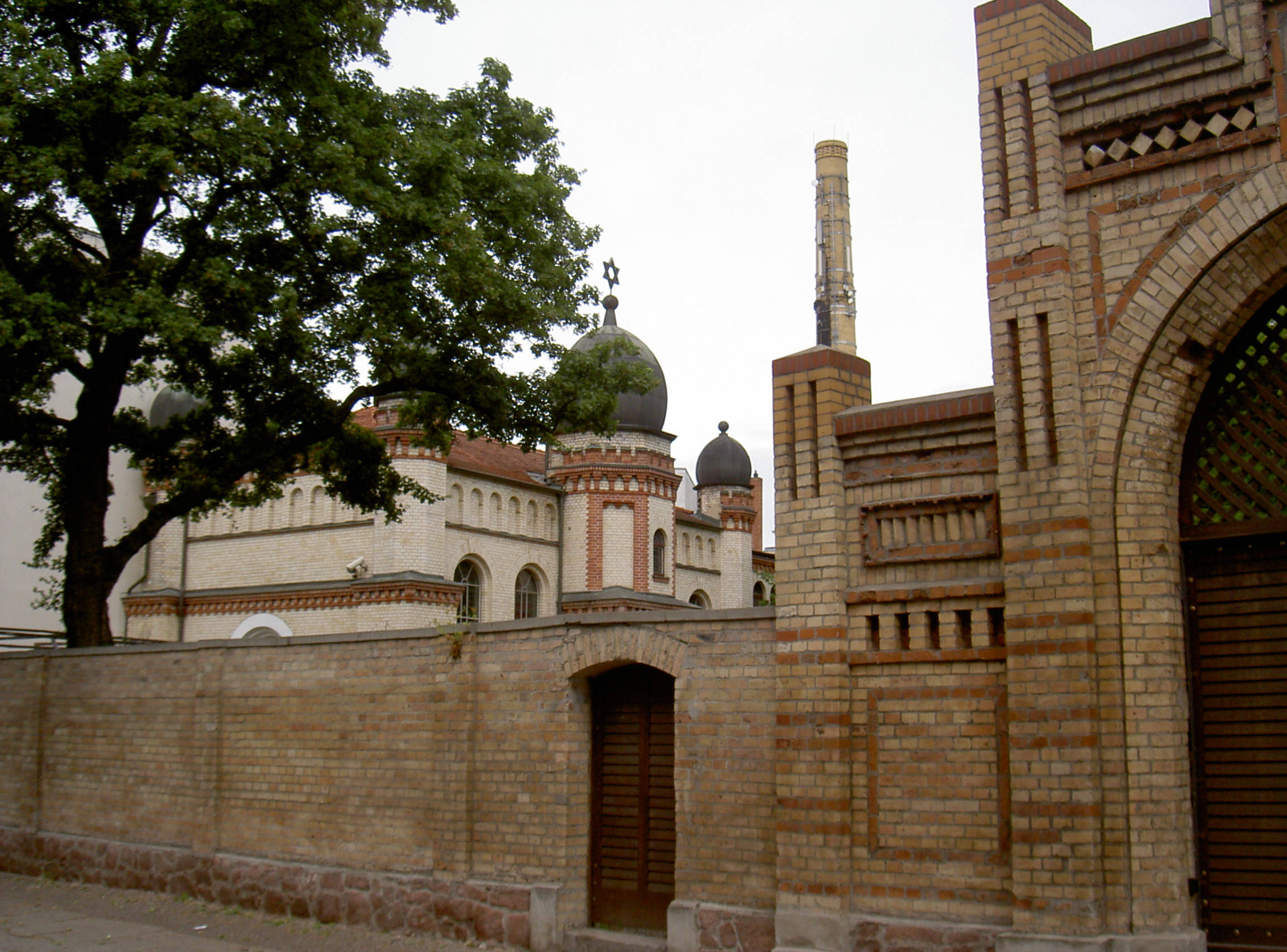
Halle Jewish cemetery gate and synagogue on the left, where it was targeted in the attack

All Jewish facilities in Germany are entitled to state security precautions. The police protection of Jewish facilities is a consequence of the Munich massacre in 1972. It is the responsibility of the Bundesländer, and carried out by the state police forces. Nevertheless, the state police of Saxony-Anhalt was not present and carried out no extra security precautions at the Halle synagogue for Yom Kippur in 2019. Daniel Neumann, director of the state union of Jewish communities in Hesse, said that smaller Jewish congregations do not have the financial resources for advanced security gear, including security doors and CCTV.

== Attack ==
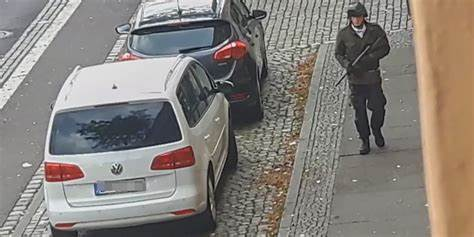
Captured CCTV still of Balliet

The attack started around noon, on the Jewish holy day of Yom Kippur, at the synagogue in the Paulusviertel neighbourhood of Halle. The attacker, Stephan Balliet, arrived there after a 45-minute drive from Benndorf. He live-streamed himself trying, but failing, to enter the synagogue, with video and audio from his action camera on his helmet. The entire footage lasted about 35 minutes and was streamed to the gaming website Twitch. The video shows Balliet displaying his weapons and speaking extreme antisemitic content in "poor English." In the livestream, Balliet denied the Holocaust and claimed feminism led to fewer births, leading to mass immigration; he blamed "the Jew" for those issues.

The gunman shot at the door's lock repeatedly and set off an explosive but the door was not breached, in part because the synagogue's security system had been recently upgraded. The upgrade included a security camera which allowed the 51 congregants inside to view Balliet's attempts to enter the synagogue. Balliet tried to enter the synagogue yard, firing shots and trying to ignite homemade explosives. At 12.03 p.m., a 112-distress call reached Halle fire-emergency HQ; one minute later, police were informed. At 2.40 p.m., federal police quick responders BFE+ arrived in the city of Halle. During the attack, Balliet's homemade explosives repeatedly malfunctioned, and he referred to himself as "a loser", being unable to breach any of the synagogue's doors, shooting his own tire by accident, and being unable to fire his gun.

A female passer-by, Jana Lange, was shot several times and killed near the entrance to the Jewish cemetery next to the synagogue, after reprimanding Balliet for making noise. A man who stopped his vehicle to check on the woman was able to get away unharmed when Balliet's weapon failed to fire. After killing the woman, Balliet drove to a nearby Turkish kebab shop. There, he opened fire through the front window. A customer, Kevin Schwarze, in the shop was injured and later killed when Balliet re-entered the shop. Authorities said they were dealing with a "rampage situation", activated the Public Alert System Katwarn, and advised the local community to stay at home and closed the city's train station.

Balliet was injured in a gunfight with police. He fled in a rented Volkswagen Golf Sportsvan, leading police on an 80-kilometre (50 mi) chase from Halle. First, he drove to Wiedersdorf near Landsberg, about 15 kilometres (9.3 mi) north-east of Halle. At about 4.00 p.m., a helicopter of the Federal Police landed in Wiedersdorf. Several police force personnel carriers and two ambulances were already present.

=== Victims ===
A 40-year-old woman from Halle, Jana Lange, who was passing by on the street near the synagogue when she was shot dead was the first victim in the shooting. In the kebab shop, Balliet shot dead Kevin Schwarze, a 20-year-old man from Merseburg. In his flight, Balliet shot at a couple in Landsberg, wounding a 40-year-old woman and a 41-year-old man. The two were admitted to Halle's university hospital with gunshot wounds and successfully underwent surgery.

== Investigation ==
In the first hours after the attack, security services worked on the assumption of multiple perpetrators. Later in the afternoon, Saxony-Anhalt's state minister of the interior Holger Stahlknecht declared that there was only one attacker, who had been arrested, and that it was being investigated whether the man had been part of a social environment or networks. Balliet was arrested in Zeitz, located about 50 kilometres (31 mi) south of Halle.

The Federal Prosecutor took over the investigation since the attack was a potential violation of Germany's internal security. The prosecutor indicated that it was investigating a "murder with special significance." According to the prosecutor's spokesperson, there are currently no indications of a terrorist organisation being involved. Security sources said the then-unidentified suspect was a German national who had no prior criminal history, and that the indications of a right-wing extremist background became stronger. On 10 October, police searched Balliet's house in Benndorf near Eisleben.

Balliet used the streaming service Twitch to broadcast his attacks. According to Twitch, that stream was not listed in the recommendations of the site or made public in any other way, meaning that he had to specifically send the link to people to lead them to the stream.

== Perpetrator ==
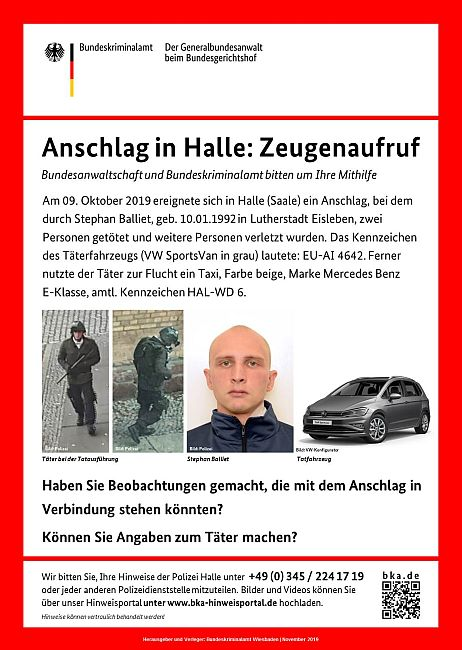
A poster released by the BKA, seeking information after the attack

The perpetrator was Stephan Balliet (born 10 January 1992), a 27-year-old German neo-Nazi, who lived in an apartment in Benndorf near Eisleben, with his mother. He grew up in Saxony-Anhalt and learned to handle weapons during his time in the Bundeswehr, having done his six-month military service in a Panzergrenadier battalion as an 18-year-old. There, he was trained on the use of the HK G36 assault rifle and the HK P8 pistol. No evidence of right-wing beliefs were found in his military file. He studied "molecular and structural product design" for one year at the age of 22, and after that chemistry for one year at Halle University.

In addition to the livestream, Balliet left a manifesto in English, where he stated his goal had been to "Kill as many anti-Whites as possible, Jews preferred." The manifesto contained antisemitic and neo-Nazi messages, photos and descriptions of his homemade weapons arsenal and information about his intentions. Balliet claimed to have chosen the Halle synagogue as the target because it was the closest place where he could find "the Jew." He wrote that "if he could kill only one Jew, that was worth the attack." His manifesto showed his belief in a "Jewish world conspiracy." Balliet announced his plans on an imageboard called Meguca, which was shut down shortly after the shooting. On Meguca, Balliet wrote that he had made DIY weapons in recent years using a 3D printer and that anyone who wanted to could watch him in a "live test" via a link to his live-stream. He utilised makeshift weapon designs by Philip Luty, forging a submachine gun made out of traditional materials with some minor 3D-printed components, along with another version almost fully 3D-printed. Along with this, he also carried two slam-fire shotguns, one with a 3D-printed shell holder, a Single-shot pistol based off of designs published in a 1972 pamphlet, a longsword, and a traditionally mass-produced Smith carbine.

A psychological assessment after the shooting described him as having a complex personality disorder with autistic traits, but that he was aware and morally responsible for his actions. He was deemed to be of an average intelligence by a forensic psychiatrist; his IQ was tested at 105. The same psychiatrist also described him as having been a socially awkward loner with an unstable sense of self-worth since his youth. During the trial he repeatedly requested he not be referred to as mentally ill under any circumstances, deeming a diagnosis "politically motivated".

== Aftermath ==
=== Reactions ===
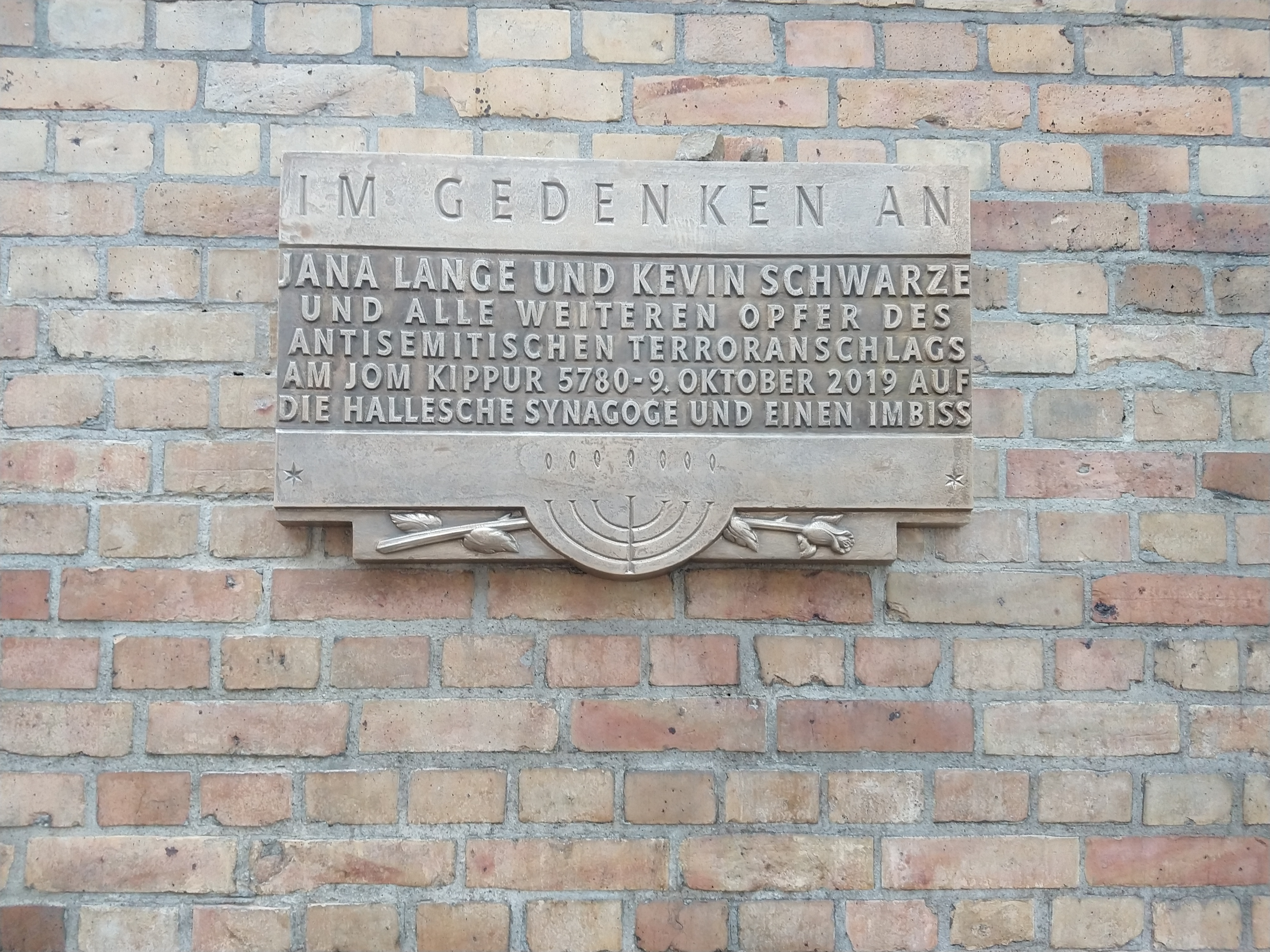
Memorial to the two victims

At the event commemorating the 30th anniversary of the Peaceful Revolution in Leipzig, German President Frank-Walter Steinmeier called for solidarity with fellow citizens who were Jewish. Chancellor Angela Merkel also offered her condolences to the families of the victims and took part in a night vigil in front of Berlin's New Synagogue. The members of the European Parliament stood for a minute of silence on the day of the attack to honour the victims and send condolences to the families. Security for Jewish institutions across the country was increased.

Josef Schuster, president of the Central Council of Jews in Germany, told TV station Das Erste that on the day of the attack there were no police patrols close to the Jewish facility in Halle. If the regular police force had been there, the second murder in the shop could have been avoided, Schuster said. He described it as "scandalous" that "the synagogue in Halle was not protected by the police on a holiday like Yom Kippur."

The New Zealand Government's Office of Film and Literature Classification also classified the suspect's livestream footage of the shootings as objectionable, making it illegal to download or distribute in New Zealand. The Chief Censor David Shanks likened the content and filming of the video to the Christchurch mosque shootings in March 2019.

The day after the attack, Spiegel Online published an article citing political scientist Matthias Quent, entitled: "The lone offender, who was not alone." Quent claimed that the perpetrator was part of a large virtual network, and that the fact that he streamed the act live and spoke in English displays the importance of this far-right "Human Haters International" for him. Especially because of the far-right subculture on the internet, it is difficult to avoid such acts, Quent said, since that subculture is not yet fully grasped by security services and social media law enforcement legislation, also he claims there is "barely any research" on the process of how radicalization occurs there.

A day after the attack, Thuringia's Minister for Interior Georg Maier (SPD) and the Bavarian Minister for Interior Joachim Herrmann (CSU) called the nationalistic-völkisch politician Björn Höcke to account. Maier said that Höcke and his party Alternative for Germany (AfD) were responsible for attacks like this, while they would be "moral arsonists", feeding antisemitic resentments. Jörg Meuthen, the AfD federal spokesman, strongly condemned the attack.

According to the Jewish Telegraphic Agency, "More than 10,000 people marched in Berlin against anti-Semitism and in a show of support for the victims of anti-Semitic violence in the city of Halle" a few days after the attack.

Hamas, the ruling Islamist political party and military organization of the Gaza Strip in Palestine, denounced the shooting stating it "poses a danger for all people and that terrorism has no religion or is not restricted to a single nation."

=== Legal proceedings ===
On 11 October 2019, during a court hearing in front of the investigating judge of the Federal Court of Justice in Karlsruhe, Balliet confessed to the crime and also confirmed a right-wing extremist, antisemitic motive. His lawyer confirmed the confession. According to investigators, Balliet hoped to inspire others to perpetrate similar right-wing extremist and antisemitic acts. On 21 April 2020, German prosecutors announced they had filed charges against Balliet, including two charges of murder, attempted murder of 68 people, incitement, bodily harm, and predatory extortion.

Balliet was sent from Saxony-Anhalt to the Federal Court of Justice. The court appointed local lawyer Hans-Dieter Weber as Balliet's defence counsel. At their first meeting Balliet asked Weber if he was Jewish, and when the lawyer said no, responded, "Even if you were a Jew, I would not reject you now." Weber said that by recording the crime, Balliet had himself provided evidence. Asked about possible role models for his crime, Balliet said, he was "aware of" and "followed" major assassinations, as well as the 2011 Norway attacks and the Christchurch mosque shootings; he denied that he had been motivated by these crimes. However during his trial, Balliet said the attack had been inspired by Brenton Tarrant, the far-right gunman who had killed 51 Muslims at two mosques in Christchurch, New Zealand in March of the same year.

On 21 December 2020, the Higher Regional Court of Naumburg sentenced Balliet to life imprisonment with subsequent preventive detention, the highest possible sentence in German law, and deemed the defendant to have a severe gravity of guilt, which effectively ruled out a release after 15 years in prison.

=== Escape attempts ===
In June 2020, Balliet attempted to escape from prison, climbing an 3.4 m (11-foot) fence during a recreation period. He was recaptured five minutes later, and transferred to a maximum security prison.

On 12 December 2022, Balliet took two prison guards hostage using an improvised gun during an escape attempt. Balliet lied to the guards that he had a machine gun, and forced them to open doors for him. Within an hour Balliet was overwhelmed and captured, after the hostages failed to unlock a door due to security measures. He was injured during his capture but the two hostages were unharmed. On 20 December 2022, Balliet was transferred to Augsburg-Gablingen prison in Bavaria as a result of the incident.

One of the prison guards held hostage developed PTSD as a result of the incident and could no longer work. A trial relating to this escape attempt began 25 January 2024. Balliet was charged with hostage taking and violating the Weapons Act. The gun was made out of wire, writing materials, and batteries. When asked by the judge if he would attempt to escape again, Balliet stated that every living thing wants to be free, and also stated that he had decided to attempt escape because he had read about the 2022 German coup d'état plot. When asked where he had obtained the powder used in the cartridges for the improvised gun, he stated it was a "professional secret". The prosecution stated that prison staff knew that he had the ability to build weapons.

On 27 February 2024 he was sentenced to seven years in prison for the escape attempt, and ordered to pay compensation to the affected officers. One of the hostages received €8,000 in compensation for pain and suffering after the hostage taking, with the other receiving €15,000, and an additional €2,262 for loss of earnings.

== See also ==
- List of attacks on Jewish institutions
- Hanau shootings
- Christchurch mosque shootings
- Buffalo supermarket shooting
- Antisemitism in Germany
- Zweibrücken scandal
