= Kurdish trial in Düsseldorf =

Trial in Germany

The Kurdish trial in Düsseldorf (also known as the PKK trial) was a major trial and span from between October 1989 to March 1994. It took place in a for this trial renovated court house at the High Court in Düsseldorf. The court room had to be adapted to the requirements for the case which demanded an extensive amount of fifteen additional special compartments for the talks between lawyers and defendants. Additionally the trial demanded that court files like the declarations of witnesses, lawyers and judges were to be translated into the languages Turkish, Kurdish and German.

== Background ==
According to the German Der Spiegel until July 1989, there have been organized over 130 manifestations in support of the defendants which had at times entered into a hunger strike. In September 1989, the leader of the Kurdistan Workers' Party (PKK) Abdullah Öcalan criticized the prosecution for classifying the deaths caused by the PKK in the Middle East as illegal murders while the deaths caused by the Turkish authorities as a necessity of a civilized nation. The case drew considerable resistance from the defendants who claimed the trial was a show, and was the cause of a large amount of manifestation in support of the defendants. In October 1989, protestors temporarily occupied the garden of the German Embassy in Paris.

=== Infrastructure ===
The trial was prepared with great care by Kurt Rebmann, who did not want to take any chances. He approached the authorities of Nord Rhein-Wesphfalia already in spring 1989, mentioning that a large trial was In preparation which seemed to exceed the currently available abilities of the state. Initially they planned to build a new building as it was done for the trial of the Baader Meinhof Komplex. But this would have taken too long, and so they opted for a renovation of a not often used building of the Court of Düsseldorf. A plan, which would have secured the buildings ceiling against rockets was dismissed but a cage of plexiglass was prepared for the defendants and the background of all the constructors of the building would be checked. A measure, which usually was only applied in the construction of prisons. The court room counted with at the time (1989) modern technical features like a soundproof cabin for the translators and an installation for simultaneous translations.

== The trial ==
=== Trial ===
Depending on the sources, initially there were 19 or 20 Kurds prosecuted but several of the defendants were released. In the beginning, the pre-trial detention conditions of the defendants was a subject, which was regulated by 57 rules provided by the court in Düsseldorf. The trial included a total of 350 days of deliberations, during which over 200 witnesses were heard. The Public Prosecutor General (German: Generalbundesanwalt) Kurt Rebmann called it he largest Terrorism-Trial in history.

=== Arguments by the prosecution ===
The prosecution wanted to show that the defendants organized a parallel justice system and established so-called peoples or revolutionary courts which had the authority to condemn people to death. The prosecution deemed the defendants as members of the Kurdistan Workers Party (PKK). The trial counted also with the first legal crown witness in Germany. The prosecution intended to provide evidence that the defendants were part of a terrorist organization within the PKK, which was responsible for several murders in Germany. The prosecution counted on the declarations of Ali Centiner, the first crown witness in German history. But his declarations were not very helpful and by 1992, only four of the initially charged were arrested and two were released pending trial while eight disappeared and were served with an arrest warrant.

=== Arguments by the defendants ===
The defendants did not agree with the detention conditions in pre-trial detention and entered into hunger-strikes. The lawyers of the defendants demanded improvements as the fact that even though the Turkish and Kurdish speaking defendants have the right to a daily visit of 1 hour, they are imprisoned for 23 hours, which not comply with the standards that apply to German defendants who can speak with other prisoners in the same language. The authorities refused any improvements, claiming that a trial in Germany is still preferable for the defendants that the extradition to Turkey. At the peak of the trial, there were 36 defending lawyers, four prosecutors, ten translators and the defendants involved in the deliberations.

=== Verdicts ===
On the 7 March 1994, Hasan Güler and Ali Aktas were both sentenced to life in prison for murders they committed. They were charged for having committed the murders on orders of the PKK. Duran Kalkan and Ali Haydar Kaytan were sentenced to 6 respectively 7 years for being involved in a terrorist organization. Both were released due to their lengthy pre-trial detention. The murders in Barelias, Lebanon, of which Haydar Kaytan was accused of, were not considered in the verdict as the judges came to the conclusion that the murders fell under a Lebanese amnesty which covered crimes committed during the Lebanese civil war.

== Controversies ==
=== Translations ===
A constant issue were the translators in the trial who made some serious mistranslations which often lead to their dismissal.

=== Crown witness ===
The prosecution relied mainly on the declarations of crown witness Ali Cetiner, who was charged with the murder of Murat Bayrakli. Usually a murderer would get a life sentence if found guilty. But due to the new crown witness law which was introduced in June 1989 with support of the Public Prosecutor General Kurt Rebmann and the Government of Helmut Kohl, Centiner would await only a verdict of a few years if in exchange he would be a witness in the Kurdish trial in Düsseldorf. Eventually, he was sentenced to 5 years imprisonment. The fact that the prosecution accepted the help of a witness who incriminated his former accomplices in exchange of a lower sentence, raised critical comments by the German politician of the Social Democratic Party (SPD) Herta Däubler-Gmelin while both, the German association of judges like the German Bar Association opposed the crown witness law.

=== Attempted incrimination of a lawyer of the defense ===
The case accounted also for the first attempt by the prosecution to incriminate a lawyer of the defense for an event that occurred during a hearing in the court room. Edith Lunnebach was quoted to have said "And you are our Stasi" (German: Und Sie sind unser Stasi) which was seen as an insult to the presiding judge Jörg Belker by the prosecution. This case within a case was heard by the judge Reiner Achter, who acquitted Lunnebach and deemed the evidence as not valid after he heard that the protocol of the hearing was not complete.
