= Hanau shootings =

2020 terrorist attack in Hanau, Germany

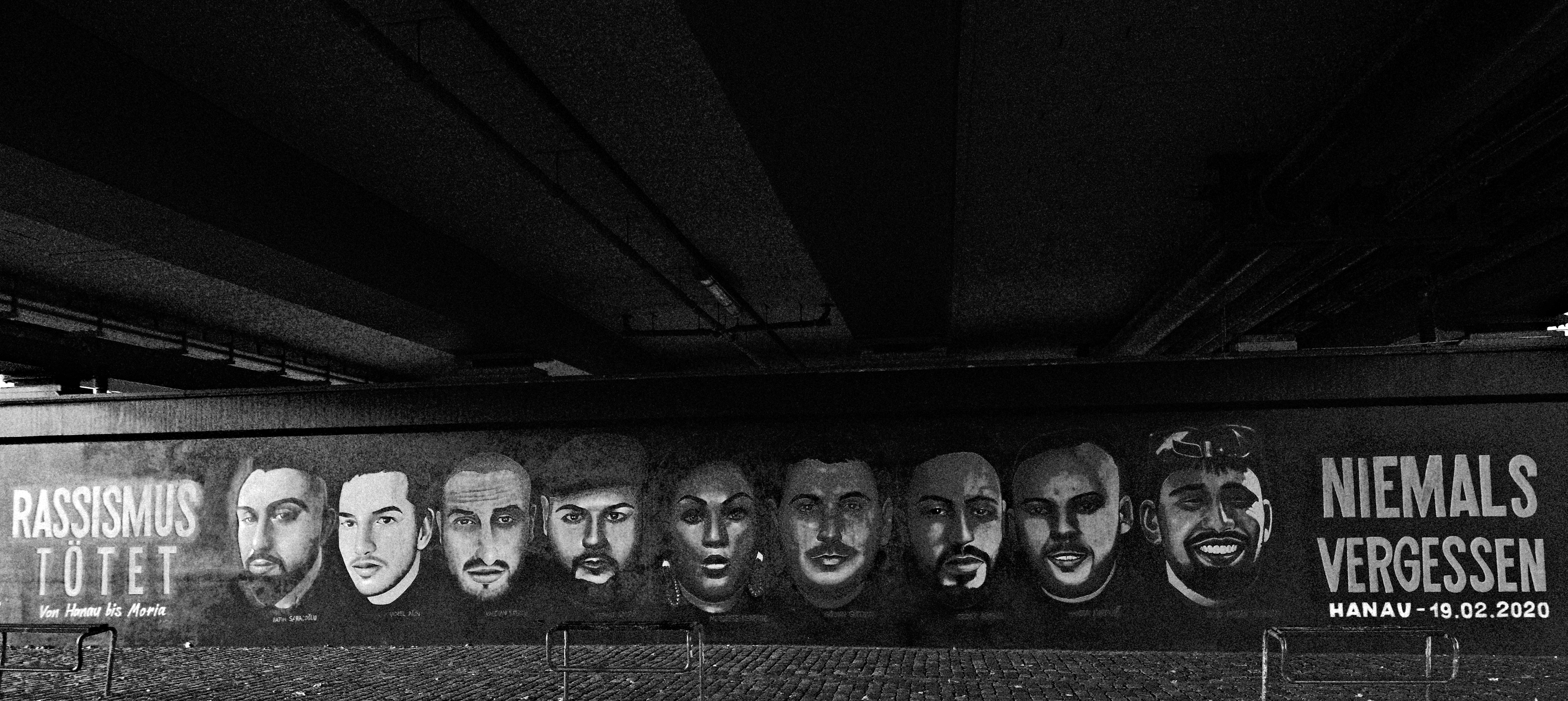
- Grafitti of victims in Frankfurt
- Location: 50°07′59″N 08°54′48″E (first crime scene) 50°07′51″N 08°53′9″E (second crime scene); Hanau, Hesse, Germany
- Date: 19 February 2020; 6 years ago 21:55 - 22:00 (CET, UTC+1)
- Target: Non-white people and immigrants
- Attack type: Mass shooting, spree shooting, mass murder, domestic terrorism, hate crime, matricide, murder–suicide
- Weapons: CZ 75 Shadow 2 (9mm); SIG Sauer P226 (9mm); Walther PPQ M2 (.22-caliber) (Unused)
- Deaths: 12 (including the perpetrator, his mother and a victim who died in 2026)
- Injuries: 4 (1 by direct gunshot)
- Perpetrator: Tobias Rathjen
- Motive: Far-right terrorism; White supremacy; Xenophobia; Islamophobia; Conspiracy theories

The Hanau shootings (German: Anschläge in Hanau) occurred on 19 February 2020, when ten people were killed and five others wounded in a domestic terrorist shooting spree by a far-right extremist targeting three bars and a kiosk in Hanau, near Frankfurt, Hesse, Germany. After the attacks the gunman, Tobias Rathjen, returned to his apartment, where he killed his mother and then committed suicide. The massacre was called an act of terrorism by the German Minister of Internal Affairs.

== Shootings ==
Map of the shooting locations

The shootings began in central Hanau at 21:55:43 CET (UTC+1) on the night of 19 February 2020. The attacker entered the La Votre Bar on Heumarkt and fired multiple shots from a CZ 75 pistol, killing a bartender. He then exited the bar and shot a man to death on the sidewalk outside, before entering the neighboring Midnight Bar and fired three shots from the doorway. One of the shots hit the owner of the Midnight Bar, killing him. At least eight shots were fired during the incident, though witnesses say they heard about a dozen gunshots. Just after the attacker shot up the Midnight Bar, he switched to his SIG Sauer P226 and confronted a man outside a kiosk. The attacker repeatedly pointed his gun at the man while asking if he was a foreigner; the man didn't respond and the attacker ran off. The attacker then rounded the corner of Heumarkt and onto Krämerstraße and fired several shots at the car of Vili Viorel Păun. Păun briefly reversed before pursuing the shooter, who turned another corner and tried to enter a kiosk. The shooter left after realizing no one was present in the building. He then ran back to his car that was parked nearby and began driving away. Păun tried blocking his path, but the shooter drove ahead of him, leading to a car chase. Three people were killed in the shootings in central Hanau.

The attacker left the scene and drove to the Arena Bar & Café in Kesselstadt, some 2.5 km (1.5 mi) away. During the drive, Păun tried to call 110 five times with two unsuccessful attempts. During the three successful attempts, he was only met with silence on the other end of the line as the dispatcher receiving the call left to respond to the shootings on Heumarkt. Upon arriving there, the gunman got out of the car and fatally shot Păun, who was sitting in his vehicle right behind him, then entered a kiosk adjacent to the bar, where he killed three people. He then entered the bar itself and opened fire as patrons were attempting to flee, killing two more people and wounding three others. According to one of the survivors, those who were present attempted to hide in the bar's storage room, but discovered that it was locked, as was the rear emergency exit. A reconstruction of the shooting by Forensic Architecture later determined that those inside the bar would've had ample time to flee if the emergency exit was unlocked. The gunman then left less than a minute after entering the bar. Six people were killed at the Arena Bar and adjacent kiosk, and three others were wounded.

Following the shootings, the police initiated a large-scale investigation. It was initially reported that the suspect was at large. The gunman then drove to his home near the Arena Bar where he shot and killed his mother with two shots, before fatally shooting himself in his room in the basement. His father was left unharmed; an investigation by Forensic Architecture revealed that the father stayed in his home and even used his computer during the police standoff in order to look up his son's manifesto. It is believed the suspect murdered his mother as an act of "mercy-killing" as she was suffering from a neurological condition that left her bedridden. The attacker, who was identified as Tobias Rathjen, and his mother were discovered by police at 05:15 the next day when they gained entry into the home.

== Victims ==
The nine people killed by the attacker during the two shootings were identified as: four Germans Gökhan Gültekin (37), Ferhat Unvar (23), Mercedes Kierpacz (35), Said Nesar Hashemi (21) (two of whom had Kurdish origins, another of Sinti origins, and another with Afghan nationality), Sedat Gürbüz (29) and Fatih Saraçoğlu (34) two Turks, Hamza Kurtović (22) a Bosnian, Kaloyan Velkov (33), a Bulgarian, and Vili Viorel Păun (22) a Romanian. Both Velkov and Păun were members of the Romani communities in their home countries. The owner of one of the shisha bars was among the victims. Three victims immediately died in the first shooting, five immediately died in the second, and a ninth victim died in hospital the next day. The attacker shot and killed his mother, Gabriele Rathjen (72) before committing suicide.

Two Turkish-Germans, an Afghan-German and a Cameroonian-German were among the five people injured.

Ibrahim Akkuş, a Turkish Kurd who had initially survived the attack, died roughly six years later on 10 January 2026 at the age of 70 due to complications from his injuries. After being shot, he had undergone months-long hospital treatments and several surgeries. Akkuş also had to use a wheelchair following the attack and was rarely able to leave his bed shortly before his death.

== Perpetrator ==
The gunman was identified as 43-year-old Tobias Rathjen (17 February 1977 in Hanau – 19 February 2020 in Hanau), a far-right extremist. On his personal website, he published a racist manifesto and posted videos showing his political and misogynist beliefs, accused U.S. President Donald Trump of stealing his slogans, promoted extreme eugenics and expressed frustration that due to his psychological issues he could never experience an intimate relationship with a woman. Media outlets often described Rathjen as an incel or "involuntary celibate"; however, researcher Meredith L. Pruden and colleagues say he is more accurately characterized as an adherent of the male separatist Men Going Their Own Way. Rathjen stated he had been guided by voices inside his head since birth and he was being followed by secret agents. In his manifesto, he explicitily called for a global two-stage genocide, consisting of a "rough-cleansing" of people from the Middle East, Central Asia, South Asia, Southeast Asia and North Africa, followed by a "fine-cleansing" of sub-Saharan Africa, Central America, South America, and the Caribbean. He also expressed a hatred for German citizens who allowed immigrants into their country, and considered them as "impure". In the videos he recorded and his manifesto, Rathjen also talked about the "secret service" that stalks humanity and compared his actions to that of Edward Snowden. There was also evidence that he had considered attacking a school filled with students from migrant backgrounds. In the weeks leading up to the shooting, he told a private detective and his father to spread the word about his personal website.

According to Germany's general prosecutor Peter Frank, Rathjen had contacted German authorities with his conspiracy theories three months before the attack: on 6 November 2019, Rathjen had written a letter to the Public Prosecutor General urging action against a "secret service" organisation, which he claimed was tapping into people's brains to control world events. He called on authorities to "approach me and communicate with me". No action was taken in response. Parts of this 19-page letter were virtually identical to his 24-page manifesto published on his website in February 2020, but it was unclear whether it included any threats against ethnic minorities.

Near the Arena Bar, text linked to the perpetrator's website was found written in graffiti on a wall before it was covered over by police. The graffiti were also found in six other locations in and around Hanau.

The perpetrator legally owned three firearms. A fourth weapon – one of the guns that was used in the shooting – was reportedly borrowed from a gun trader the day prior to the attack.

== Investigation ==
Federal prosecutors treated the attack as terrorism, with officials saying there was evidence the gunman was a far-right extremist, as well as signs of xenophobic motives for the killings. Peter Beuth, the Minister of the Interior in the state of Hesse, stated on 20 February that a website found by investigators indicated a right-wing political motive for the shootings. A letter and a video clip of a confession were reportedly discovered and analysed by the police.

== Reactions ==
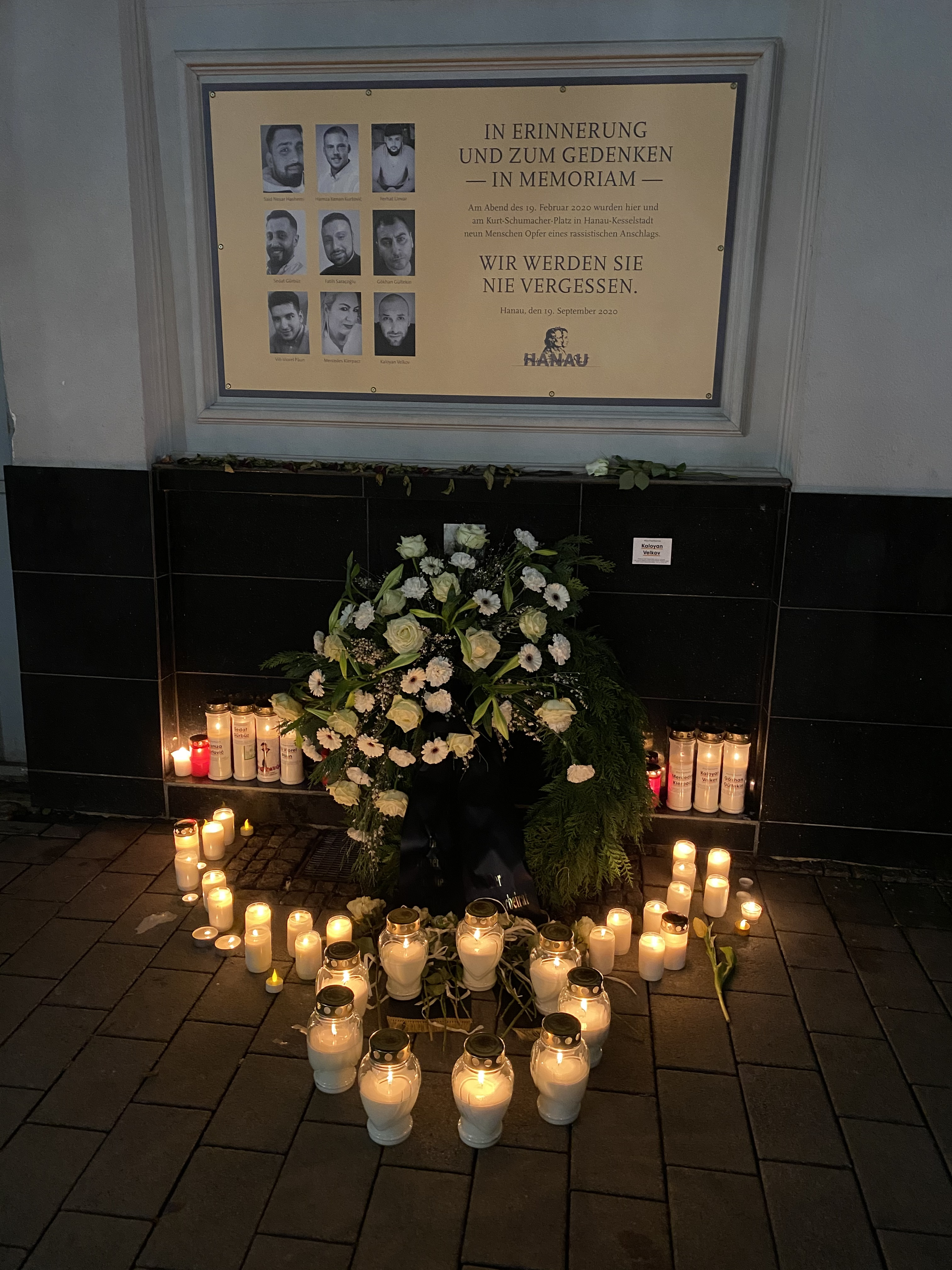
Memorial plaque remembering the victims, located next to the first crime scene in downtown Hanau

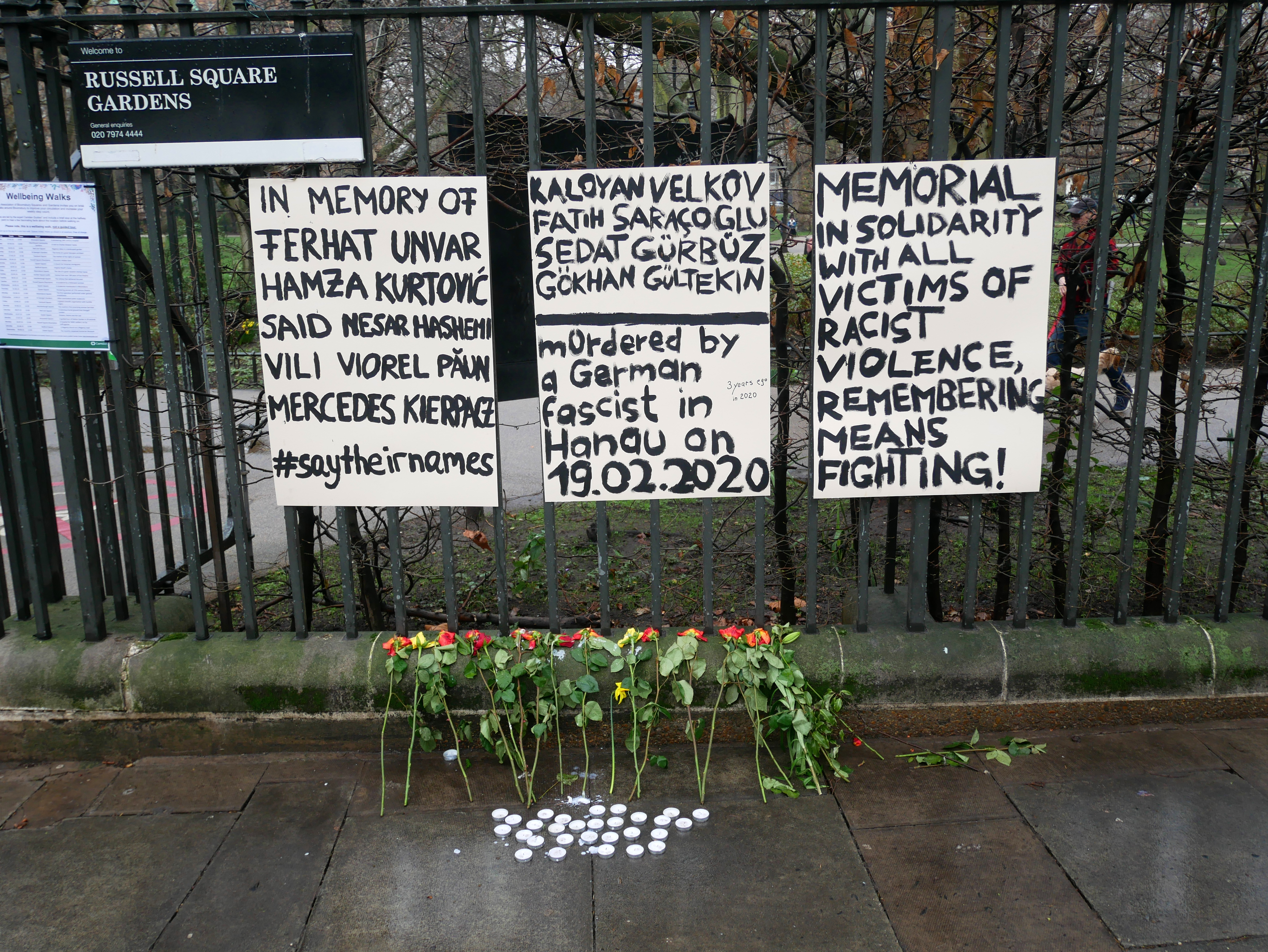
A temporary memorial to the victims of the 2020 attacks created in Russell Square, London, in 2023

As a result of the shootings, German Chancellor Angela Merkel cancelled a planned trip to Halle and expressed her condolences to the victims' families. The president of the European Parliament, David Sassoli, also offered condolences. Some Turkish citizens were among the victims of the shooting; the Turkish government described it as a form of racism and urged a prompt investigation. German president Frank-Walter Steinmeier, his wife Elke Büdenbender, and the Hesse minister-president Volker Bouffier attended a vigil at one of the shooting sites. Pope Francis extended his sympathy to the families who lost their loved ones during the shooting, through the Vatican Secretary of State, Cardinal Pietro Parolin.

On 23 February, 10,000 mourners marched through the streets of Hanau, in order to show unity and support for the victims. The mayor of Hanau gave a speech to the gathering.

On 24 February, in response to the shootings, the United Kingdom proscribed Sonnenkrieg Division, the British branch of the American neo-Nazi organisation Atomwaffen Division, as a terrorist group. Another UK-based far-right organisation, System Resistance Network, was also proscribed as an alias for National Action, which had been proscribed as a terrorist organisation since 2016.

On the one year anniversary of the attack (19 February 2021), large memorial services and rallies were held in multiple cities in Germany to commemorate the victims, warn against racism and demand further action. President Frank-Walter Steinmeier attended a ceremony in Hanau condemning hate and racism while acknowledging mistakes by authorities.

Until his death in April 2026, Rathjen's father was repeatedly noted for stalking, harassing, and threatening survivors and families of dead victims, insisting that his son was innocent. He had already been noted as early as 2017 for filing criminal cases against neighbours to local authorities and known to complain about the presence of workers with African, Polish, and Turkish backgrounds. In December 2020, the elder Rathjen requested the weapons used by his son in the shootings from police. He was twice convicted of insult in 2022 and 2023. In the first instance, he was fined €4,800 and jailed upon failing to pay the fine. In the second instance, he again refused to pay a fine of €9,000, which led to foreclosure and another jail sentence. In October 2024, he was convicted of Volksverhetzung, coercion, false accusation, insult, and violations of anti-violence laws and fined €21,600.

== In the media ==
In March 2022, it was announced by filmmaker Uwe Boll that he was writing and directing a fictionalized portrayal of the shootings as a feature film. The movie, titled Hanau, has been described by the filmmaker as "an intense psychogram" of Rathjen. The film, titled Hanau (Deutschland im Winter - Part 1) was released on 4 March 2022, to unfavorable reviews.

== See also ==
- 2004 Cologne bombing
- 2016 Munich shooting
- 2019 Halle synagogue shooting
- Murder of Michèle Kiesewetter
- National Socialist Underground murders
- Zweibrücken scandal
