= Roya Hakakian =

Iranian American author

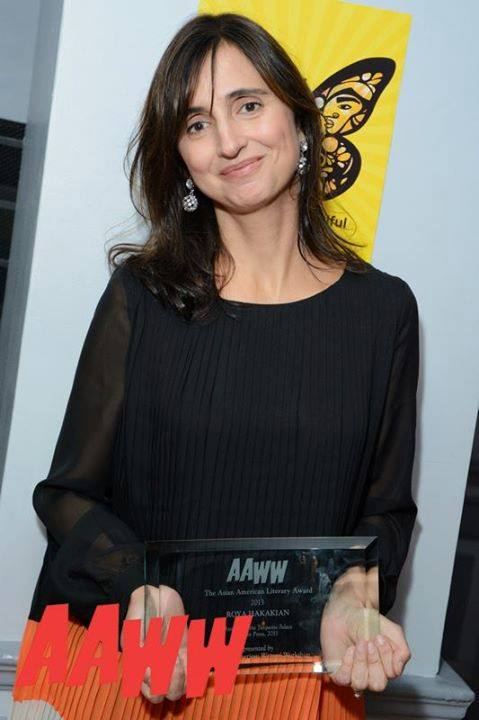
- Roya Hakakian
- Born: Persian: رویا حکاکیان; Tehran, Iran
- Citizenship: American
- Education: Brooklyn College
- Occupations: Writer; Journalist; Lecturer
- Writing career
- Language: Persian, English
- Genre: Non-Fiction
- Website: www.royahakakian.com

Roya Hakakian (Persian: رویا حکاکیان) is an Iranian American Jewish writer, journalist, and political commentator. Born in Iran, she came to the United States as a refugee and is now a naturalized citizen. She is the author of several books, including an acclaimed memoir in English called Journey from the Land of No (Crown), Assassins of the Turquoise Palace (Grove/Atlantic), and A Beginner's Guide to America: For the Immigrant and the Curious (Knopf).

Influenced by both the literary traditions of her birth country and its historical turmoils, Roya Hakakian often draws her inspirations from political subjects and treats them with lyricism. She takes on the difficult contemporary sociopolitical issues —exile, persecution, censorship— and injects them with relevance and urgency through her observant and poetic sensibility to make these subjects accessible to all readers.

== Biography ==
Hakakian was born and raised in a Jewish family in Tehran. She was eighteen years old during the 1979 Iranian Revolution. After the return of Ayatollah Khomeini and the rise in anti-semitism as well as social and economic pressures and ongoing war with Iraq, she emigrated in May 1985, to the United States on political asylum. She studied psychology at Brooklyn College and also studied poetry under the American poet and writer Allen Ginsberg during her time there.

Hakakian came to critical attention as an author for her 2004 memoir, Journey from the Land of No. Her memoir's publication was hailed by Yale University Professor Harold Bloom as the debut of a writer with "a major literary career." Her essays on Iranian issues have been published in the New York Times, the Washington Post, the Wall Street Journal and on NPR.

Awarded a Guggenheim Fellowship in 2008, she began working on Assassins of the Turquoise Palace, a non-fiction account of the Mykonos restaurant assassinations of Iranian opposition leaders in Berlin. The book was later published in 2011 by Grove/Atlantic.

Hakakian was a term member at the Council on Foreign Relations from 2000 to 2004. From 2009 to 2010, she was a fellow at the Yale Whitney Humanities Center and is a current fellow at Yale University's Davenport College. In 2014–2015, she was a visiting fellow at the Wilson Center for International Scholars. Since 2015, she has taught writing at the THREAD at Yale. She was a founding member of the Iran Human Rights Documentation Center and served on the board of Refugees International. In 2018, Hakakian was also a scholar at Hadassah-Brandeis Institute at Brandeis University. In 2021, she joined the board of the Connecticut Immigrant & Refugee Coalition as an honorary member. She is also a permanent member at the Council on Foreign Relations. In 2023, she was selected as a visiting fellow at the SNF Agora Institute of Johns Hopkins University. In 2025, she received the Pomegranate Lifetime Achievement Award for Literature from the American Sephardi Federation.

She has been a featured speaker at many colleges and universities as well as she has appeared on CBS This Morning, PBS' Now with Bill Moyers, The Dylan Ratigan Show on MSNBC, among others. In 2009, Hakakian spoke at the University of California at Berkeley, detailing her life from Iran to the United States and discussing the parallels between Muslim and Jewish youths in reconciling “modernity and religious identity.”

Professor Harry Kreisler, the host of the UCBK's interview series, later published a selection of his best interviews in a book called Political Awakenings: Conversations with History, including Hakakian's interview. He called Hakakian "one of the most important activists, academics, and journalists of our generation.”

== Works ==
=== Books ===
==== Journey from the Land of No: A Girlhood Caught in Revolutionary Iran ====
Journey from the Land of No: A Girlhood Caught in Revolutionary Iran (Crown) begins in 1974 and ends in 1984, the ten years during which Iran transformed. Hakakian carefully chooses a handful of personal stories which illuminate the greater stories she wishes to tell, namely how the lives of women, Jewish community, and secular Iranians changed in the aftermath of the 1979 revolution. The book was a Barnes & Noble's Pick of the Week, Ms. magazine Must Read of the Summer and Publishers Weekly’s Best Book of the Year. It won the Persian Heritage Foundation's 2006 Latifeh Yarshater Book Award, and is the 2005 winner of the Best Memoir by the Connecticut Center for the Book. It also received an Elle magazine's Best Nonfiction Book of 2004. In granting the award, one Elle magazine jury member Danielle Bauter said, “Hakakian eloquently captures her childhood with words that create a dreamscape in the mind’s eye. From the perspective of a teenager coming to terms with her own identity and the changing times around her, she juxtaposes the innocence of her youth with the fierceness of Iran’s political climate. I became very involved with her journey, and the beauty of her writing drew me into her story — so much so that I will think about this book long after having finished it.”

The playwright Katori Hall in her review of the book for the Boston Globe said, “A spectacular debut memoir . . . Only a major writing talent like Hakakian can use the pointed words of the mature mind to give the perspective of the child. … She tackles ideologies of assimilation and oppression with poetic aplomb and precision. ... . Hakakian’s tale of passage into womanhood lacks nothing.”

The Baltimore Sun said of the book, “Hakakian, irrepressible, brave, and strong-willed, watches in dismay as the country she loves disappears, to be replaced by one that views what Roya most values—an insatiable intellect—with profound contempt. Like Anne Frank, she is a perceptive, idealistic, terribly sympathetic chronicler of the gathering repression.”

The late literary scholar Harold Bloom hailed the book and called it, “An immensely moving, extraordinarily eloquent, and passionate memoir.” He prophesied that the author would have a major literary career ahead. Journey from the Land of No: A Girlhood Caught in Revolutionary Iran has been a Freshman Experience Book at several colleges throughout the US and has been translated into Dutch, Spanish, and German. It was selected by The Guardian as the top 10 books about Iran in 2020.

==== Assassins of the Turquoise Palace ====
In her second book Assassins of the Turquoise Palace (Grove/Atlantic), Hakakian departs from the personal narrative form to delve into a work of investigative journalism. She carefully pieces together, through eyewitness testimonies, police reports, archival documents, court evidence, and countless interviews, the story of the assassination of four Iranian and Kurdish leaders at a restaurant named Mykonos in Berlin, Germany in 1992. She begins the book from the moment of the crime and follows the events until the historic verdict that the court issued in April 1997. The work marks the first time that a highly political event in contemporary Iranian history has been told in a nonfictional narrative form for general readers. In a starred review, Kirkus Reviews called the book "a nonfiction political thriller of a very high order." Assassins of the Turquoise Palace was a New York Times Book Review Editor's Pick and a New York Times’ Notable Book of 2011. In a piece for Slate Magazine, the great late public intellectual Christopher Hitchens said of the book "Even as they continue to breach every known international law, all the while protesting at interventions in their 'internal affairs,' the theocrats in Tehran stand convicted of mounting murderous interventions in the affairs of others. Roya Hakakian's beautiful book mercilessly exposes just one of these crimes, and stands as tribute to the courageous dissidents and lawyers who managed one of that rarest of human achievements; an authentic victory for truth and justice." Hakakian's characterization of German attorneys Alexander von Stahl and Bruno Jost led the United States Federal Bar Association to honor to those attorneys with a ceremony at the Daniel Moynihan Federal Courthouse in New York City on February 25, 2014. Assassins was also named among the 2011 Best of Nonfiction by Kirkus Reviews.

==== A Beginner's Guide to America: For the Immigrant and the Curious ====
Hakakian's newest book A Beginner's Guide to America For the Immigrant and the Curious was yet another departure for the author. This time she chose to write in second person narrative, straddling between fiction and nonfiction. Hakakian walks the immigrant through the moment of arrival in America through the naturalization process. Hakakian decided to write the book when the anti-immigrant sentiments reached a fever pitch in 2016. While the book appears to be written for new immigrants, it is just as much written for the native born Americans who, unaware of the privileges of their own country, must see it through the perspective of a newcomer to discover what they take for granted. Pulitzer Prize winner Jennifer Egan called the book "striking and beautiful," while Anthony Kronman, Yale law professor and author of The Assault on American Excellence, called the book, "a stirring, insightful, funny and uplifting book whose real predecessor is Alexis de Tocqueville." According to a review by Tunku Varadarajan for the Wall Street Journal, Hakakian's account is notable for its balance: "She offers counsel to readers, not commandments, and although her book could be seen as a love letter to America, it is one that’s been written by an exacting lover who isn’t blind to this country’s flaws." In his review for The Boston Globe, Jeff Jacoby wrote about the book, "Lyrical and perceptive, “A Beginner’s Guide to America” is an immigrant's love letter to the nation that took her in. And it is a timely reminder of what millions of human beings endure when they uproot their lives to become Americans by choice."

=== Poetry ===
Hakakian is the author of two collections of poetry in Persian, the first of which, For the Sake of Water, was nominated as poetry book of the year by Iran News in 1993. In 2006, it won the Latifeh Yarshater Award from the Association for Iranian Studies. Hakakian was listed among the leading new voices in Persian poetry in the Oxford Encyclopedia of the Modern Islamic World. Her poetry has appeared in numerous anthologies around the world, including La Regle Du Jeu and Strange Times My Dear: The PEN Anthology of Contemporary Iranian Literature, which features works from over 40 writers who have contributed, "to this rich and varied collection—or, to use the Persian term, golchine, a bouquet—one that provides a much-needed window into a largely undiscovered branch of world literature." Hakakian's work also appears in the forthcoming W.W. Norton’s Contemporary Voices of the Eastern World: An Anthology of Poems. She has contributed to the Persian Literary Review, and served as the poetry editor of Par Magazine for six years. One of her most important poetic influences is the Iranian poet Ahmad Shamlou.

=== Essays ===
Hakakian has extensively written about the plight of women in the Middle East with a particular focus on Iran. Her April 7, 2019 opinion piece “There are two types of hijabs. The difference is huge,” co-authored with Iranian journalist Masih Alinejad for the Washington Post, was named one of the best Post op-eds of 2019. Her March 2021 essay "Unveiling Iran" in the New York Review of Books told the story of how women in Iran are fighting the country's compulsory hijab rule.

Hakakian also focuses on Jewish issues in her writings, making note of unique aspects of Jewish community and commenting on antisemitism in America and abroad. As an Iranian Jew, she has written about the intersection of national identity and Jewish identity and the clashes that occur when someone of both origins tries to take sides in modern political conflicts. Iran, she says, is an outlier in that the government pushes antisemitism upon its unwilling people as opposed to most other governments trying to weed out antisemitism on the political fringe.

=== Film, Television, and Other Media ===
Hakakian has collaborated on over a dozen hours of programming for leading journalism units on network television, including 60 Minutes and on A&E's Travels With Harry, and ABC's Documentary Specials with Peter Jennings, Discovery and The Learning Channel. Commissioned by UNICEF, Hakakian's film, Armed and Innocent, on the subject of the involvement of underage children in wars around the world, was a nominee for best short documentary at several festivals around the world. Actor Robert De Niro narrates the film, while one of the children featured is played by Ishmael Beah. Hakakian has also appeared on a variety of podcasts and radio stations, including a WQXR collaboration with The Metropolitan Opera in a conversation about Giuseppe Verdi and the experience of exile, as well as on the podcast EconTalk.

== Social activism ==
In 2020, Hakakian signed the controversial "A Letter on Justice and Open Debate," which appeared on July 7 in Harper's Magazine; other signatories include feminist Gloria Steinem, writer J.K. Rowling and linguist Noam Chomsky. She later explained her decision to sign the letter in a subsequent article where she argued that the well-being of the American democracy was entwined with the well-being of other democracies and democratic activists around the world.

Following the 2022 attack on British-American writer Salman Rushdie in New York, Hakakian read excerpts of Rushdie’s work at the New York Public Library alongside other writers, including Gay Telese and Colum McCann, to promote free expression.

Roya Hakakian is a vocal critic of the Islamic Republic of Iran. In September 2022, she testified before the United States Senate Committee on Foreign Relations on the state of "women leaders fighting authoritarianism" in Iran. She has since published several essays for The Atlantic about the ongoing movement and offered commentary on CNN’s Fareed Zakaria GPS and MSNBC.

== Victim of hacking ==
In February 2015, Hakakian's Gmail and Facebook accounts were hacked, as well as her personal cellphone. It is believed the government of Iran was behind the incident.

== Bibliography ==
- Journey from the Land of No: A girlhood caught in revolutionary Iran
- Assassins of the Turquoise Palace
- Persian: بخاطر آب (For the Sake of Water)
- Persian: نامی سزاوار نیایش (A Name to Worship)
- A Beginner's Guide to America: For the Immigrant and the Curious

== Interviews ==
- Conversations with History Interview (56 mins.)

== See also ==
- List of famous Persian women
- Iranian American Women Foundation
- List of Iranian women activists
