= IAWF =

IAWF may refer to:

- International Association of Wildland Fire
- International Amateur Wrestling Federation, the former name of United World Wrestling
- Iranian American Women Foundation
- Islamic Republic of Iran Wrestling Federation
