= Alexander von Stahl =

German lawyer and politician

Attorney General of Germany
- In office 1 June 1990 – 6 July 1993
- Chancellor: Helmut Kohl
- Preceded by: Kurt Rebmann
- Succeeded by: Kay Nehm

Personal details
- Born: 10 June 1938 (age 88) Berlin, Germany
- Party: Free Democratic Party

Alexander von Stahl (born 10 June 1938 in Berlin) is a German lawyer, liberal politician and civil servant. He served as Attorney General of Germany from June 1990 until July 1993.

Before he was appointed Attorney General, he served as an Under-Secretary of State in the Berlin State Ministry of Justice (1975–1989), in West Berlin.

His term as Attorney General was marked by the war on terror (particularly the Red Army Faction) and the prosecution of former communist criminals after the downfall of the GDR communist regime. In 1991, he indicted Erich Mielke, who was subsequently convicted of murder.

On 6 July 1993, he was removed from his post by the German Justice Minister Sabine Leutheusser-Schnarrenberger following a row over the alleged police shooting of a suspected terrorist, Wolfgang Grams, on 27 June. The Minister of the Interior, Rudolf Seiters, had resigned two days before. An investigation did not reveal any wrongdoing on the part of the police or the authorities, and there were calls by some to reinstate Stahl in his position. He has subsequently worked as a lawyer.

Stahl is a member of the Free Democratic Party. He became a member of the FDP in North Rhine-Westphalia in 1961, and served as a board member of the Berlin state party from 1989 until his appointment as Attorney General. He was Secretary General of the FDP parliamentary group in the Berlin state parliament from 1970 to 1975.

In the 1990s, he and other liberals tried to revive the national liberal tradition of the FDP. He was a candidate for President of the Berlin state party in 1996 and 1998, but lost narrowly to the candidate of the left-wing, Martin Matz, who later defected to the SPD, retaining his parliamentary mandate. He is a prominent supporter of, contributor to, and lawyer for the right-wing newspaper Junge Freiheit.

In 2014, von Stahl and Bruno Jost received the inaugural Rule of Law Award from the American Federal Bar Association, for their work in establishing the involvement of the Iranian government in the 1992 Mykonos restaurant assassinations. The Iranian-born writer Roya Hakakian credits von Stahl, in his capacity as Attorney General, for protecting the German federal prosecution from political and diplomatic pressure. Since reunification, Germany had the strongest bilateral relation with Iran among European nations, and the FDP was in favor of greater trade and outreach to the Iranian regime. According to Hakakian, von Stahl "went against the wishes of some of the most powerful figures in his own party" in his indictment of Kazem Darabi in 1993 by naming the intelligence agency of Iran as the planner of the assassination. The landmark case concluded in 1997 and turned public opinion against the Iranian regime, leading to the withdrawal of all European Union ambassadors from Iran.

== Publications ==
- Terrorismus und Spionage. Einschätzungen des Generalbundesanwalts. Übersee-Club, Hamburg 1991.
- Das Erbe des Ministeriums für Staatssicherheit (MfS). Hochschule für Verwaltungswissenschaften Speyer, Speyer 1993.
- Kampf um die Pressefreiheit. Chronologie eines Skandals. Die Verfassungsbeschwerde der Wochenzeitung 'Junge Freiheit' wegen Verletzung der Meinungs- und Pressefreiheit durch Verfassungsschutzberichte des Landes NRW. Reihe Dokumentation, Bde. 5-7, Edition JF, Berlin 2003–2004: ISBN 3-929886-15-4, ISBN 3-929886-17-0, ISBN 3-929886-18-9

Legal offices
Preceded by Kurt Rebmann	Attorney General of Germany; 1990–1993	Succeeded by Kay Nehm
