= Zweibrücken scandal =

Ongoing scandal in the Bundeswehr

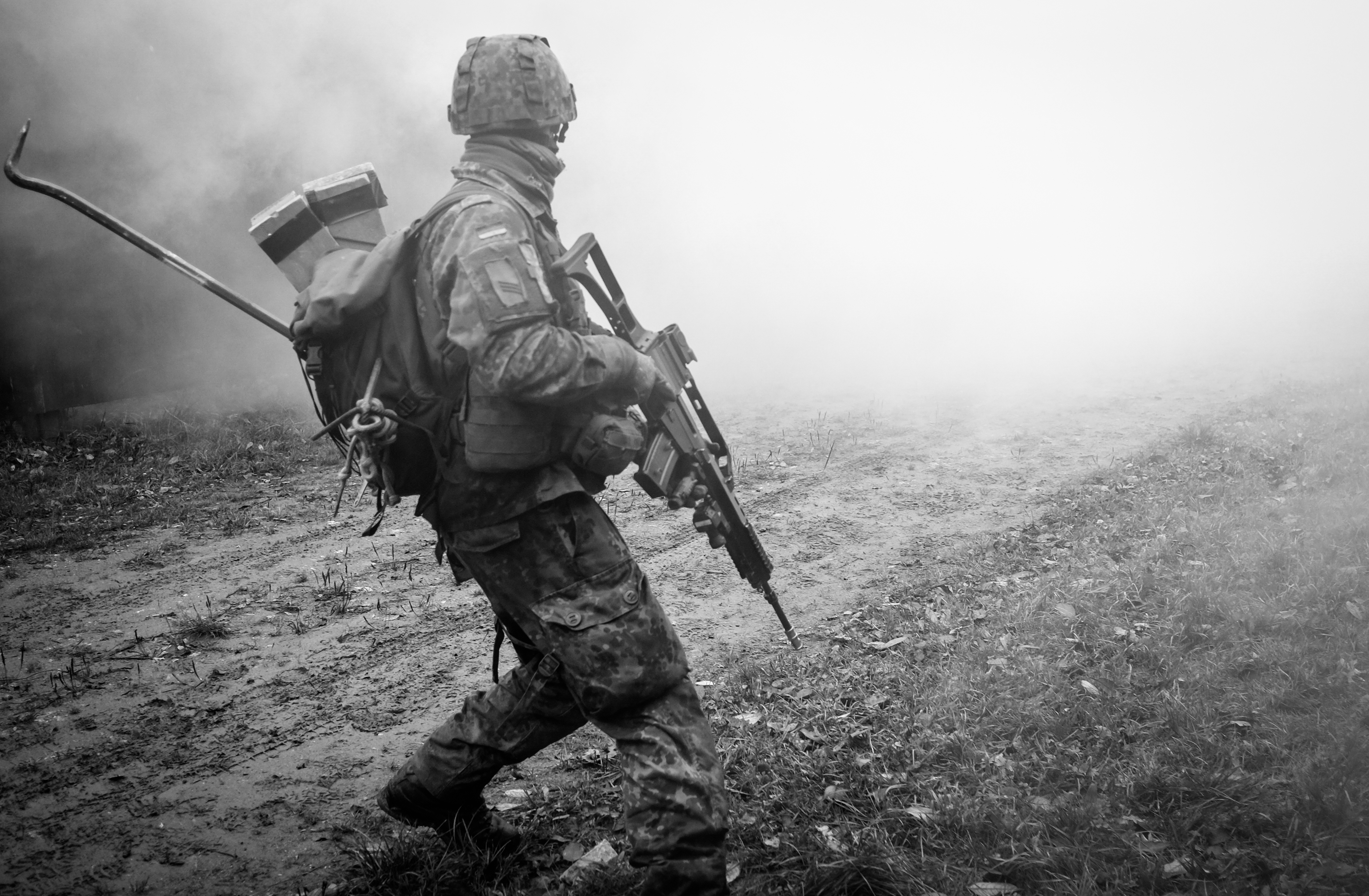
- A paratrooper from the Fallschirmjäger Regiment 26 in November 2019. The regiment has been at the center of the Zweibrücken scandal in 2025.
- Date: 2025-2026
- Location: Zweibrücken, Rhineland-Palatinate, Germany
- Participants: Paratroopers and commanders of the Bundeswehr Fallschirmjäger Regiment 26

The Zweibrücken scandal is an ongoing scandal involving far-right extremism, sexual abuse, and drug use among elite paratroopers in the German Bundeswehr, centered in Zweibrücken in the Rhineland-Palatinate. Troops in Regiment 26 have been accused of using Nazi salutes, phrases, and uniforms, forming neo-Nazi cliques, and of sexually harassing and assaulting female soldiers. Troops have also been accused of abusing drugs, particularly cocaine.

The German media and public first became aware of the incidents in September 2025, after an anonymous tip led to investigations by a local newspaper. Subsequent investigations showed that German military and political leaders received complaints from soldiers in February and June 2025, and that extremist incidents date back to 2013.

The scandal has hit the Bundeswehr at a sensitive time, as it attempts a major re-armament, and seeks new recruits. German military and political leaders have been criticized for failing to respond to complaints promptly. The German armed forces and in particular its elite units have been the focus of repeated scandals involving far-right extremism, the hoarding and caching of weapons, and planned or actual assassinations for several years.

== Background ==
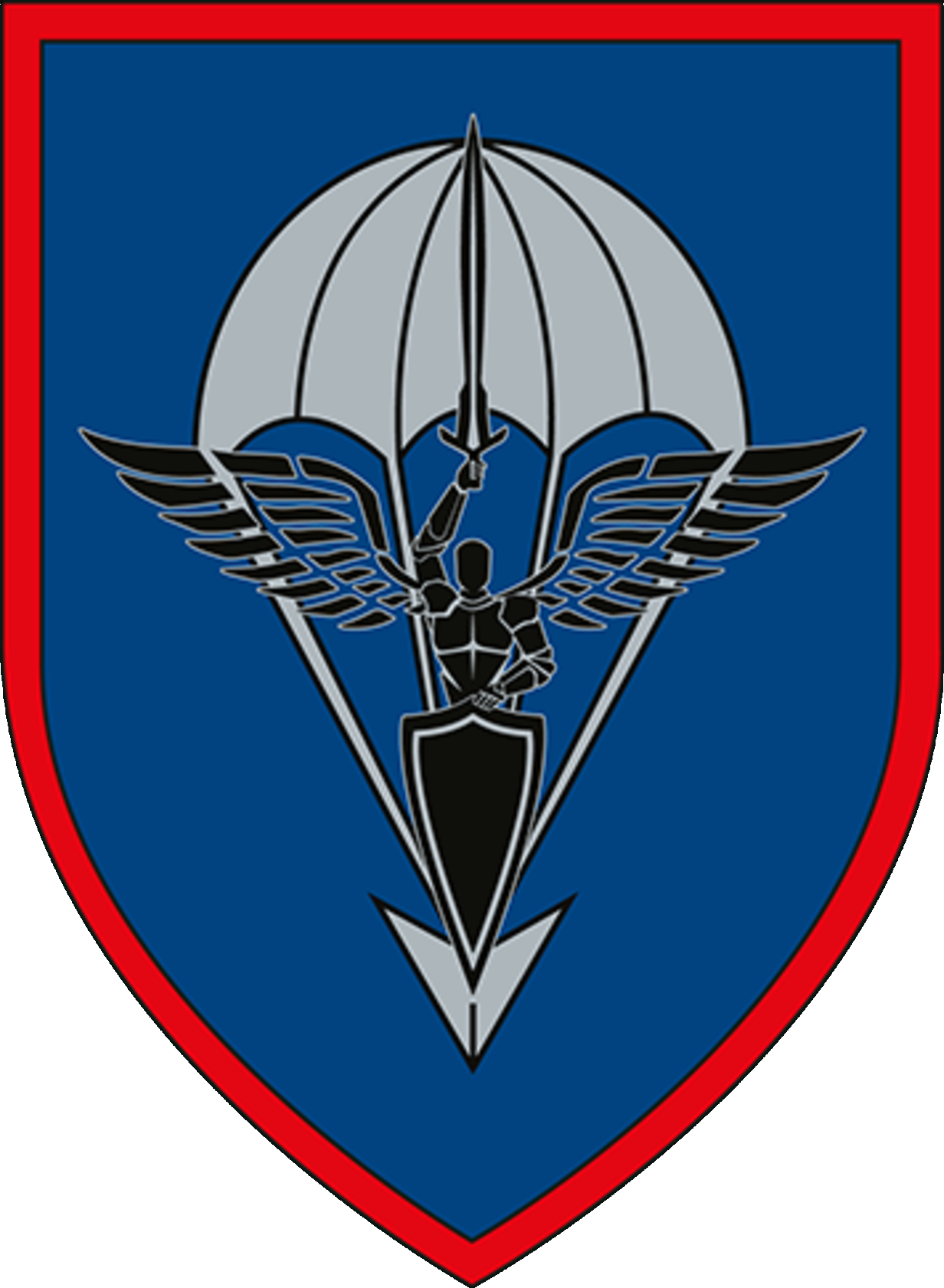
Symbol of the Fallschirmjäger (Paratrooper) Regiment 26 in Zweibrücken

=== Paratroopers ===
Germany's Bundeswehr includes 4,000 paratroopers of the Rapid Forces Division, who are considered elite forces and often spearhead military operations throughout the world. German paratroopers have been deployed to Afghanistan, Mali, and Sudan. German paratrooper units are located both in Zweibrücken and in Seedorf, Lower Saxony. Regiment 26 comprises approximately 1,700-1,800 soldiers.

=== Right-wing extremism and abuse in the Bundeswehr ===
German military counterintelligence services (MAD) investigated allegations of extremism among Special Forces Command (KSK) soldiers in the southern town of Calw between 2017 and 2021. In 2020, the German government acknowledged that it was investigating over 600 soldiers for extremism in its armed forces of 184,000 members, and that extremism was concentrated in elite units. The Bundeswehr and German government have found that weapons and ammunition have been stolen from military stockpiles and hoarded by far-right, extremist soldiers. As of 2020, this included an estimated 48,000 rounds of ammunition and over 60 kilograms of explosives from the KSK alone. German authorities have said they are concerned that other German security services may also be infiltrated by far-right extremism; The New York Times linked the rise of the far-right in German military and security services to the growth of the Alternative for Germany. MAD was itself later accused of purposely ignoring, delaying, or limiting investigations into far-right extremism.

In 2020, an entire elite special forces unit was dissolved due to "toxic leadership" and "extremist tendencies." In 2022, a Bundeswehr soldier was convicted of plotting to assassinate politicians. Originally arrested in 2017, the soldier, Franco A., had planned to pin the killings on Syrian refugees.

Two paratroopers from Regiment 26 were convicted of rape in April 2023.

The World Socialist Web Site alleges that the project of German military re-armament, the largest in Germany since World War II, requires depicting enemies and describing strategic objectives in a manner linking contemporary policy to German imperialism in the 20th century.

== Scandal ==
Adolf Hitler giving the Nazi salute at a 1935 Nazi Party rally in Nuremberg

In June 2025, several female paratroopers submitted complaints to the German Parliament. Dozens of paratroopers were soon implicated in right-wing extremism, sexual misconduct, and drug use. Altogether, over 200 incidents were uncovered, and over 260 interrogations have been carried out, covering a period from 2013 to 2025.

=== Nazism and far-right extremism ===
These incidents have included right-wing extremist activities, the formation of an openly antisemitic clique, Hitler salutes, the formation of a Nazi group, and wearing Nazi uniforms. Hitler salutes in the regiment have been given as greetings. Insults have included terms like "Judensau" (Jew-sow). One soldier in uniform is alleged to have said that he wished more Jews had been killed in the Holocaust. Internal military reports suggest incidents dated back to 2013.

=== Sexism and sexual violence ===
Incidents included sexual assault, objectification, sexist language, exhibitionism, and bullying of women. Some female soldiers reported being forced to hear rape fantasies from other soldiers, and being threatened with rape. One platoon leader reportedly encouraged rape culture among the soldiers. Internal reports indicate incidents had occurred from as early as 2016; one female soldier said that sexual harassment occurred over a "prolonged period of time."

=== Substance abuse and violent rituals ===
Soldiers have been accused of abusing cocaine, cannabis, and of binge drinking. They have also been accused of engaging in violent rituals, and in December 2025 paratroopers entered Zweibrücken's Christmas market armed with visible weapons that included an assault rifle, a machine gun, and a loaded pistol, disturbing town inhabitants. In response a regimental commander Martin Holle apologized, but added that it was generally "legitimate" for soldiers to display weapons and military equipment in public. Zweibrücken officials responded that the Bundeswehr had neither requested nor been granted authorization to display weapons at the market.

=== Government inaction ===
Internal situation reports of the Bundeswehr show that the Ministry of Defense and Bundeswehr leadership had reports of political extremism and sexual misconduct in Regiment 26 as early as February 2025. These reports included information indicating problems of extremism and misconduct dating to 2013. An Army inspector stated in January 2026 that the German Parliament's Commissioner for the Bundeswehr had also received initial, named complaints as early as February 2025.

== Investigations ==
Investigations of misconduct by the Zweibrücken paratroopers have involved the German media, the Zweibrücken public prosecutors office, the German Parliament, military disciplinary prosecutors, other Bundeswehr agencies, and the Military Counterintelligence Service.

=== German government ===
The earliest reporting of complaints to the German Defense Forces and Parliament date to February 2025. Female soldiers in Regiment 26 submitted further complaints in June 2025. Henning Otte, the Parliamentary Commissioner for the Armed Forces, took office the same month and visited soldiers in Zweibrücken unannounced. Bundeswehr officials told German media that the military first began investigating Regiment 26 in June.

The Bundeswehr intensified its investigations into Regiment 26 during the summer of 2025. Initial investigations led to further reports from paratroopers within Regiment 26. The Bundeswehr's Field Army Commander Lieutenant General Harald Gante declared his intention to "sweep clean with an iron fist;" the army stated that it has encountered resistance to its investigations. By December, army investigations comprised more than 6,000 pages.

On January 14, the Inspector of the Army and the Inspector General, Lieutenant General Christian Freuding and Carsten Breuer, held a restricted briefing with members of the German Bundestag. Freuding promised the army's intention to implement an "Airborne Troops Action Plan" in January, which would alter supervision and leadership among airborne units. Freuding said that if the army is unable to convict offenders, "military excellence is worthless. Green Party parliamentarian Agnieszka Brugger complained that the defense minister Boris Pistorius had commented only belatedly on the investigation and was absent from the briefing.

== Media ==
German media did not become aware of the allegations until September and October 2025; In September 2025, the German media first reported on the allegations when the daily Pfälzischer Merkur received an anonymous tip. After media reports, the German army acknowledged that it had begun investigations in June 2025.

A December investigation by the Frankfurter Allgemeine Zeitung revealed that misconduct was especially concentrated in Regiment 26's 4th Paratrooper Company, where a Nazi clique became a powerful force. The report found that the extremist and abusive behavior was tolerated for years.

== Disciplinary actions ==
In early October 2025, Parachute Regiment 26's commander Oliver Henkel was removed from his post. In a final speech to his soldiers, Henkel declared, "I have a clear conscience and am convinced that truth and justice will prevail in the end."

In December, the Budeswehr announced that 55 suspects were under investigation, discharge proceedings had begun for 19 of them, and three had already been discharged. In January 2026, several paratroopers were discharged from the army, and some were forbidden from wearing uniforms pending further investigation.

The local public prosecutor's office in the Rhineland Palatinate has also begun legal proceedings against more than a dozen paratroopers. Local prosecutions are mostly for drug offenses, hate crimes, and displaying banned extremist symbols.

== Reactions ==
=== German government ===
On 28 December, the Rhineland-Palatinate's Minister and President Alexander Schweitzer, a member of the SPD party, said that the behavior of the paratroopers could not be tolerated. On 30 December, Defense Minister and SPD politician Boris Pistorius called the cases of political extremism, sexual misconduct, and drug use "shocking," and said that local commanders had failed to adequately respond to the crisis. Pistorius was criticized for failing to comment on the scandal until December 2025. Green Party parliamentarian Agnieszka Brugger said that the crisis was a "huge problem" that would impede recruitment of "the most capable people for military service."

Some local politicians including Cristoph Gensch of the CDU criticized the government, and said that the incidents were "isolated." Gensch opined, "the entire airborne force is being thrown under the bus." Another CDU politician, Florian Bilic, made similar complaints.

=== Regiment 26 ===
Paratroopers of Regiment 26 reacted negatively to the investigation, criticizing it and army disciplinary measures against its members. The regimental commander has taken legal action to oppose his forced transfer from the unit.

=== Media ===
Der Spiegel and the Financial Times reported that the scandal was likely to harm military recruitment at a time when German armed forces were seeking to expand. Der Spiegel argued that as the United States was no longer viewed as a reliable military partner, the Bundeswehr needed to project an image of modernity. The paper lamented that the scandal would depress the recruitment of female soldiers. The Financial Times stated that the scandal would hinder a new government program to attract 18-year-olds into military service, "amid fears of Russian aggression." The paper also noted that the scandal gave a poor impression of the Bundeswehr and German soldiers compared to Russian soldiers as Germany's Chancellor, Merz, promised that German troops would play a role in the future of Ukraine.

The Financial Times reported that a study published published by the Bundeswehr in 2025 found lower rates of right wing extremism in the armed forces compared to the German population overall.

The World Socialist Web Site stated that the belated response of the military indicated that the Bundeswehr was concerned with damage control, not transparent investigation. The site stated that the Bundeswehr's Inspector General, Freuding, was photographed in May 2025 alongside Oleg Romanov, a neo-Nazi and commander of the fascist Paskuda unit in the Ukrainian Army.

== See also ==
- Murder of Walter Lübcke
- Halle synagogue shooting
- Hanau shootings
