= Harald Range =

German jurist and Attorney General

Attorney General of Germany
- In office 17 November 2011 – 4 August 2015
- Chancellor: Angela Merkel
- Preceded by: Monika Harms
- Succeeded by: Peter Frank

Personal details
- Born: 16 February 1948 Göttingen, Germany
- Died: 2 May 2018 (aged 70) Karlsruhe, Germany
- Party: FDP
- Education: University of Göttingen

Harald Range (16 February 1948 – 2 May 2018) was a German jurist and was Attorney General of Germany.

== Early life and career ==
After completing his studies at the University of Göttingen Range began his career with the judiciary of Lower Saxony, serving as a judge from 1975 to 1978, as a prosecutor from 1978 to 1986 and as a senior prosecutor at the Higher Regional Court in Celle from 1986 to 1989.

From 1989 to 2001 Range held various roles within the Lower Saxon Ministry of Justice, including as the leader of the Criminal Law, Law of Criminal Proceedings, and Clemency Unit. From 2001 until 2011 Range served as the State Attorney General in Celle.

== Attorney General of Germany ==
Range served as Attorney General of Germany from November 2011 until 2015.

Following the 2011 attack on the British Embassy in Iran, Range launched investigative proceedings against possible plans for Iranian attacks on American military installations in Germany in the event of an attack against Iran.

After coming under pressure from Parliament and the news media in June 2014, Range began a formal investigation of what he called “unknown” members of American intelligence agencies on suspicion that they had eavesdropped on one of Chancellor Angela Merkel’s cellphones. By June 2015, he dropped the investigation because of a lack of concrete evidence.

Based on the code of crimes against international law, Range investigated members of the Syrian government under President Bashar al-Assad on suspicion of committing crimes against humanity in 2015.

In the aftermath of the treason investigation of netzpolitik.org, Federal Minister of Justice Heiko Maas forced Range into retirement for breach of public trust on 4 August 2015.

== Death ==
On the night of 2 May 2018, he collapsed in a café in Karlsruhe and subsequently died. According to Deutsche Welle, "reports suggest" that his death was caused by a heart attack.

== Other activities ==
- Lions Foundation Germany, Member of the Board of Trustees
- Lions Clubs International, Member
