= Kay Nehm =

German lawyer

Attorney General of Germany
- In office 7 February 1994 – 31 May 2006
- Chancellor: Helmut Kohl; Gerhard Schröder; Angela Merkel
- Preceded by: Alexander von Stahl
- Succeeded by: Monika Harms

Personal details
- Born: 4 May 1941 (age 85) Flensburg, Germany
- Education: Kiel University; University of Freiburg; LMU Munich

Kay Nehm (born 4 May 1941 in Flensburg) is a German lawyer. He served as Attorney General of Germany from 7 February 1994 until 31 May 2006.

Nehm studied law at LMU Munich, the University of Freiburg and Kiel University. He was appointed a federal judge at the Federal Court of Justice in 1991. As an Attorney General, he was widely regarded as having sometimes taken politically unpopular but legally stringent decisions. During his time in office, he investigated the German-based perpetrators of the September 11 attacks.

Since 2014, Nehm has been serving as president of the Deutscher Verkehrsgerichtstag. In 2016, he was appointed by Federal Minister of Transport and Digital Infrastructure Alexander Dobrindt to serve on the German government’s Ethics Commission on Autonomous Driving.

== Publications ==
- Straflose Straftaten? Zur Rettung verfassungswidriger Strafgesetze durch Absehen von Strafe (Vortrag vom 17. February 1997), Heidelberg 1999. ISBN 3-8114-9599-2
- Die Zuständigkeit des Generalbundesanwalts für die Verfolgung extremistischer Einzeltäter (Vortrag vom 8. Mai 2001), München 2002. ISBN 3-406-48632-0
- Das nachrichtendienstliche Trennungsgebot und die neue Sicherheitsarchitektur, in: NJW 2004, S. 3289 bis 3295.

Legal offices
Preceded by Alexander von Stahl	Attorney General of Germany; 1994-2006	Succeeded by Monika Harms
