= Crown witness (Germany) =

Legal term

In Germany, a crown witness (Kronzeuge) is a witness in a criminal trial who testifies against accomplices in order to receive a lower sentence from the prosecution. Crown witnesses came to prominence during the Red Army Faction (RAF) trials in the 1970s. The German Bar Association has criticized the system, claiming that testimony by crown witnesses often obstructs trials.

== History ==
=== Early crown witnesses ===
During the 1970s, a left-wing well organized wave of violence went through Germany and Diether Posser, the Justice minister of North Rhine-Westphalia at the time, wanted to enable that witnesses were allowed to testify in return for a lenient sentence or even a remuneration, if there was little to no chance to capture a prosecuted criminal without a crown witnesses testimony. Posser wanted to enable the prosecutor to release the crown witness, which was denied by the Bundesrat and also the Justice minister Johann Vogel, who presented a different draft law, which kept the authority at the court, and demanded at least a three year sentence for a murder. Four different attempts were presented, but in 1976, a crown witness rule was not included in the new anti terror legislation.

There was no witness protection program in Germany as there was in the United States of America, which encouraged the murder of Ulrich Schmücker, a witness who testified against his accomplices. The crown witness Karl-Heinz Ruhland was sentenced only to four years, and pardoned after two years in prison. He later repented his testimony as he initially didn't receive a protection from the state. Only after he publicly announced that he was unsatisfied with the situation, he received protection and a monthly allowance. Per law, he would have deserved at least a verdict over five years imprisonment, as he confessed to having been involved in a bank robbery. Dierk Hoff, a crown witness who testified against Andreas Baader, Jan-Carl Raspe and Gudrun Ensslin enabling their life sentences, was sentenced to four years and eight months imprisonment, instead of receiving a life sentence for building the bombs for the RAF. The crown witness Gerhard Müller was also spared from a life sentence with his testimonies. By law he would have deserved a life sentence for his involvement in several bombings, murders and attempted murders. But he only received 10 years imprisonment, and was released after seven years. Because a witness would be able to be spared of a life imprisonment if he incriminated others, and other crown witnesses did not receive any protection, the treatment these crown witnesses received, was viewed as illegal by the media, but necessary by the prosecution.

=== Small crown witness rule ===
In 1981, a so-called "small crown witness rule" was first issued, which enabled witnesses in drug-related trials to receive a lower sentence. From 2000 onwards, there was also a law that lowered the sentence of a witness who came to an agreement with the prosecution in trials concerning money-laundering. Both laws were later criticized by the German Bar Association.

== Crown witness rule ==
A law called "crown witness rule" (German: Kronzeugenregelung) concerning the testimony of a witness in terror-related cases was introduced with the support of State Prosecutor Kurt Rebmann in 1989 during the government of Helmut Kohl. Initially only valid until 1992, it was prolonged several times. The crown witness rule of 1989 was abolished in 1999. In 2009 a new crown witness rule came into force and since then, witnesses in cases of a wider range were allowed to become a crown witness.

=== Crown witnesses ===
The first witness who gave his testimony with this law was Ali Cetiner. He was a crown witness in the Kurdish trial in Düsseldorf, but his testimony was not very effective and of the initially 20 defendants only four were sentenced and two of the sentenced were released. The crown witness who testified against Kani Yılmaz, the PKK representative in Europe, committed suicide by self-immolation in 1997.

== See also ==
- Turn state's evidence
