= Ludwig Martin =

German lawyer

Markus Ludwig Martin (25 April 1909 – 31 March 2010) was a German lawyer. He served as Attorney General of Germany from 7 April 1963 until 30 April 1974.

== Early life and education ==
Born in Waltenhofen as the son of a dairy worker, Martin was able to take his Abitur thanks to a teacher, despite his father's opposition. He subsequently went on to study law and economics at the Ludwig-Maximilians-Universität München. From 1933 to 1934, he additionally studied philosophy at the Pontifical Gregorian University in Rome.

Martin earned his first and second Staatsexamen in 1932 and 1937 and joined the Bavarian judiciary.

== Career ==
In 1939, Martin was appointed an investigating judge, later a criminal judge and a scientific associate at the Reichsanwaltschaft. In October 1939, he was appointed district attorney in Nuremberg and Fürth, and in February 1940 in Leipzig. However, as he was conscripted into military service from 1939 to 1945, he never actually worked as a district attorney.

In 1946, Martin was appointed a judge in Sonthofen, and in 1950, he was employed in the Federal Ministry of Justice. In 1951, he was appointed Oberstaatsanwalt in the Generalbundesanwaltschaft, and in June 1952, he was appointed Federal Attorney (Bundesanwalt). He was appointed a federal judge in 1953, serving for ten years until 1963, mostly as a criminal judge at the Federal Court of Justice of Germany.

In 1963, Martin was appointed Attorney General of Germany. During his term of service, the Spiegel scandal and the Guillaume Affair took place.

=== Retirement ===
He retired in 1974 and was succeeded by Siegfried Buback, who was murdered in 1977 by left-wing terrorists.

Martin lived for the rest of his life in Karlsruhe, where he celebrated his 100th birthday in 2009.

== Honours ==
Martin was president and honorary president of the German section of the International Commission of Jurists and honorary president of the German-Italian Lawyer's Association. He was also honorary president of the International Society for Human Rights (IGFM). Martin advocated capital punishment. As the IGFM's president of the board of trustees, the Chilean government of Augusto Pinochet considered him a "reliable friend". In 1987, Martin together with board member Lothar Bossle, warned the Chilean authorities that the relations between West Germany and Chile might deteriorate if the crimes in Colonia Dignidad became known. He was a devout Catholic and a conservative, and a Knight of the Order of the Holy Sepulchre and the pontifical Order of St. Gregory the Great. He also received the Great Cross of Merit with star.
