= Philip Luty =

English gun activist (1965–2011)

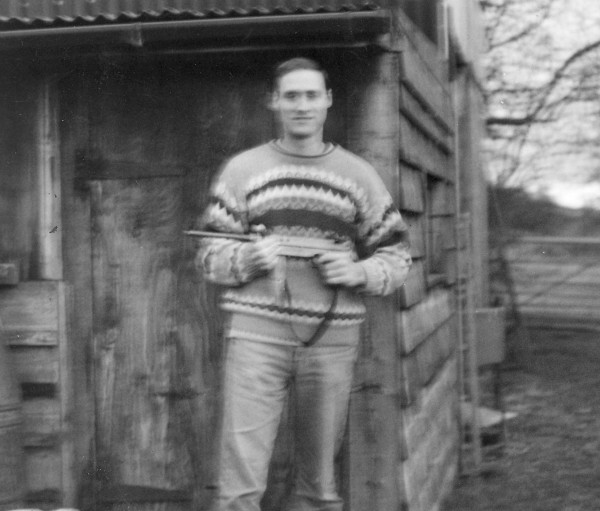
- Luty, c. 1998
- Born: Philip Andrew Luty; 19 October 1964; Leeds, England
- Died: 8 April 2011 (aged 46); Tinshill, Leeds, England
- Website: thehomegunsmith.com

Philip Andrew Luty (19 October 1964 – 8 April 2011) was an English gun rights activist, who was notable for the production of homemade firearms and manuals providing instruction at the same time. He was charged with illegal arms construction in the late 1990s and sentenced to four years in prison, with other investigations ongoing at the time of his death.

Weapons based on Luty's designs have been used or found in numerous recorded incidents of criminal or terrorist activity, including criminal groups in Australia, Brazil, Romania, Sweden, Ecuador, the United Kingdom, with terrorist organizations in Indonesia, Myanmar and in the 2019 Halle synagogue shooting, an antisemitic terror incident in Germany.

== Life ==
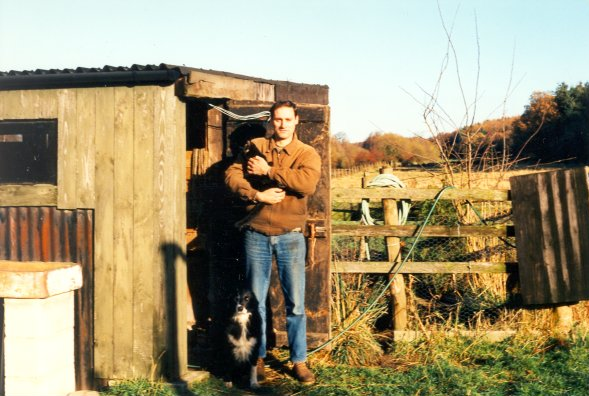
Luty pictured in his family's farm

Philip Andrew Luty was born in Leeds on October 19, 1964. He grew up on a farm in West Yorkshire, England.

Luty campaigned for the free possession of firearms and published instructions on self-built fully automatic weapons that can be produced by simple metalworking. Luty understood his work as a protest against the British government's strict gun control policies, which he described as fascist. He was charged with illegal arms construction in the late 1990s and sentenced to four years in prison in 1998.

In 2009, another charge was made after an armed anti-terrorist unit searched Luty's home in May 2009. Luty was subsequently tried for violating the Terrorism Act 2000. In particular, he was accused of "creating records that could be of use to a person who wants to commit or prepare a terrorist attack". He also possessed a "collection of pipes which could be screwed together to produce an item from which a bulleted cartridge could be discharged."

He had also been the prime suspect in a campaign of harassment against a local charity and property developer in Cookridge from 2006 to 2009. He was arrested for criminal damage incidents but was released due to a lack of evidence.

== Death ==
On 8 April 2011, Luty died after a prolonged battle with cancer. The criminal case against him was ended because of his death.

== Firearms design ==
Luty designed several firearms, including four sub-machine gun designs. Of these, one particular design, outlined in his book Expedient Homemade Firearms, is the best known. This design makes extensive use of easily procured materials such as folded sheet metal, bar stock, washers, and hex screws. It is a simple blowback-operated sub-machine gun and entirely made from craft-produced components, including the magazine and pistol grip. The major drawback of such designs is the lack of rifling in the barrel, which results in poor accuracy and limited range.

Two copies of the original 'Luty SMG 9mm Parabellum' are part of the collection of the British National Firearms Centre (NFC) and are exhibited in Leeds at the Royal Armouries Museum.

== Usage of Luty-type guns ==
Luty submachine guns have been documented in Australia, Brazil, Germany, Indonesia, Romania, Sweden, Ecuador, the United States, and the United Kingdom.

In October 2019, a German neo-Nazi killed two people in an antisemitic terror attack outside a synagogue in the German city of Halle. The attacker live-streamed his actions online, during which he used a 3D-printed gun based on Philip Luty's designs which repeatedly malfunctioned.

== Publications ==
- P.A. Luty: Expedient Homemade Firearms – The 9 mm Submachine Gun. Paladin Press, 1998, ISBN 9780873649834
- P.A. Luty: A Threat to Freedom of Speech in England. The Libertarian Enterprice, no 313, 3 April 2005
