= Monika Harms =

German lawyer

Attorney General of Germany
- In office 1 June 2006 – 30 September 2011
- Chancellor: Angela Merkel
- Preceded by: Kay Nehm
- Succeeded by: Harald Range

Personal details
- Born: 29 September 1946 (age 80) Berlin, Germany
- Party: Christian Democratic Union
- Education: University of Hamburg; University of Heidelberg

Monika Harms (born 29 September 1946 in Berlin) is a German lawyer. She has served as Attorney General of Germany from 2006 - 2011.

== Early life and education ==
Harms was born in Berlin on September 29, 1946. After completing the Abitur in Frankfurt am Main in February 1966, she started studying law at the University of Heidelberg and later at the University of Hamburg, where she did her first state exam in April 1971, followed by the second one in March 1974. Between 1971 and 1974 she also had her judicial clerkship ("Referendariat") in Hamburg.

== Career ==
After graduating, Harms worked as a prosecutor in Hamburg until she became a judge at the regional court ("Landgericht") of Hamburg. Between 1983 and 1987 she was a judge at the Fiscal Court Hamburg (Finanzgericht). Afterwards she was appointed as a judge at the Federal Court of Justice in 1987, where she later became a presiding judge as well. She became the Attorney General of Germany in June 2006, an office which she held until reaching the age limit in 2011.

During her time in office, she played a crucial role in Germany's fight against terrorism. In April 2007, Harms announced that the government would not pursue charges against Donald Rumsfeld and 11 other U.S. officials in connection with the Abu Ghraib torture and prisoner abuse scandal, stating the accusations did not apply, in part because there was insufficient evidence that the acts occurred on German soil, and because the accused did not live in Germany. In September 2007, following a six-month investigation, her office stopped a major terrorist attack against American and German targets by arresting three Islamic militants and seizing a large amount of potentially explosive chemicals and military-grade detonators.

In another much-discussed move in 2008, Harms overturned Marinus van der Lubbe's conviction of setting the 1933 Reichstag fire, after a lawyer in Berlin alerted her to the fact that he had yet to be exonerated under a law passed in 1998. The law allowed pardons for people convicted of crimes under the Nazis, based on the concept that Nazi law "went against the basic ideas of justice".

== Other activities ==
Harms, who is considered an expert in law regarding fiscal offences also works as a lecturer at the Ministry of Finance's Bundesfinanzakademie since 1990, and she held various other lectureships. In January 2008 she became an honorary professor at the University of Halle-Wittenberg.

- Friends of the Gewandhaus, Chairwoman of the Board of Trustees
- Leipzig University, Chairwoman of the University Council (2010-2014)

== Personal life ==
Harms is married and a member of the Christian Democratic Union.
