= Peter Frank (jurist) =

German jurist

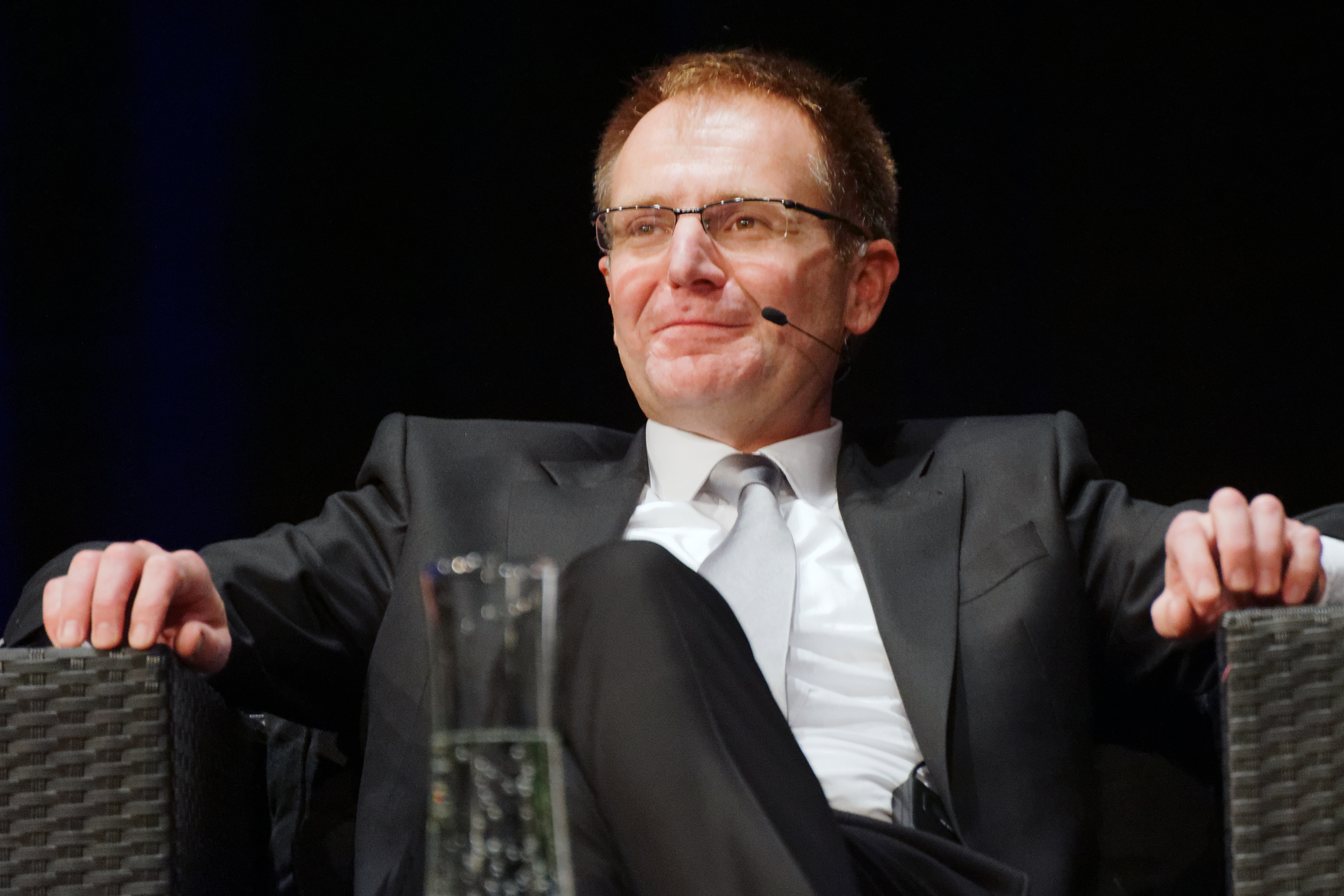

Justice of the Federal Constitutional Court of Germany
- Incumbent
- Assumed office 21 December 2023
- Nominated by: CDU/CSU
- Appointed by: Bundesrat
- Preceded by: Peter Müller

Public Prosecutor General of Germany
- In office 5 October 2015 – 21 December 2023
- Preceded by: Harald Range
- Succeeded by: Jens Rommel

Personal details
- Born: 5 May 1968 (age 58) Lauda-Königshofen, West Germany
- Education: University of Würzburg

Peter-Herbert Frank (born 5 May 1968) is a German jurist who is currently serving as a judge in the Federal Constitutional Court in the second senate. Prior to this, he served as Public Prosecutor General and as Attorney General for the Higher Regional Court of Munich.

== Early life and education ==
Frank was born in Lauda, and studied legal theory at University of Würzburg. During his studies, he joined the conservative Catholic Studentenverbindung Cheruscia Würzburg, which is associated with the Cartellverband. He completed both Staatsexamen in Würzburg with the highest possible marks. He was awarded a Doctor of Law from the University of Würzburg in 1995 in Criminal Law and Criminal Procedure. His doctorate was titled Die Verwertbarkeit rechtswidriger Tonbandaufnahmen Privater regarding the usability of illegal tape recordings by private persons.

== Professional career ==
In April 1995, Frank joined the Bavarian State Ministry of Justice, and over the next twenty years was rotated through a number of roles, spending a short period as State's attorney for the State's Attorney's Office of Munich I. Frank then was a member of the Bavarian Landesvertretung, representing the interests of the federal state of Bavaria to the federal government. After this, he was a judge for the first district court of Munich. In November 2006, he returned to the Bavarian Ministry of Justice, serving under Beate Merk with roles in the personnel department and leadership. From February 2010 through September 2011, he was a judge at the Higher Regional Court of Munich. In October 2011, Frank returned to the Bavarian State Ministry of Justice, where he headed the personnel department, where he was involved in or responsible for all important hires, promotions, and relocations. In March 2015, Frank was promoted to Attorney General of the Higher Regional Court of Munich. Since 2007, Frank has been the editor of the Citizen's Handbook, published by the Federal Agency for Civic Education.

=== Public Prosecutor General ===
The government of Bavaria had planned to suggest Frank as Public Prosecutor General at the next scheduled change, which was planned for early 2016. However, Frank was nominated to the position in August 2015 by Federal Minister of Justice and Consumer Protection Heiko Maas, after Harald Range was forced to retire in the wake of the netzpolitik.org "Treason" scandal. Aged forty-six, he was the youngest person to assume this position. During his tenure the office took a clear opposition to right wing extremism.

=== Notable cases ===
==== Henriette Reker ====
His first case as the Public Prosecutor General became the investigation over the stabbing of the independent politician of Henriette Reker by a right wing militant. Reker was stabbed during an election campaign after which she became elected Mayor of Cologne.

==== Murder of Walter Lübcke ====
He also was in charge of the investigations into the murder of the acting president of the Regierungsbezirk Kassel in Hesse, Walter Lübcke, who was also the victim of a right wing militant. In 2020 Frank announced the prosecution of the captured suspect for murder.

==== Turkish spies ====
By 2017 his department led investigations against nineteen presumed agents of the Turkish National Intelligence Organization. Several of the defendants were Imams in Mosques from the Turkish Islamic Union of Religious Affairs (DiTiB).

==== Sanctions against Russia ====
From mid-2023, Frank oversaw the prosecution's efforts to confiscate more than 720 million euros ($790 million) from the Frankfurt bank account of Russia's National Settlement Depository (NSD), marking Germany's first such attempt.

=== Judge of the Federal Constitutional Court of Germany ===
A nominee of the Union parties, on 24 November 2023 he was elected by the Bundesrat to succeed Peter Müller as sitting judge of the Federal Constitutional Court of Germany in the Court's second senate. He was inaugurated on 21 December 2023.

== Other activities ==
- Max Planck Institute for the Study of Crime, Security and Law, Member of the Board of Trustees

== Personal life ==
Frank is a practicing Roman Catholic. His wife is from Margetshöchheim and teaches mathematics and physics. Together they have two daughters and one son.
