= Netzpolitik.org =

German news website

- Website type: Blog
- Available in: German
- Owner: Netzpolitik.org e.V.
- Creator: Markus Beckedahl
- Editors: Co-Editors-in-Chief: Anna Biselli, Daniel Leisegang Markus Beckedahl and ~30 other persons
- Website: netzpolitik.org
- Launched: 2002; 24 years ago
- Content license: CC-BY-NC-SA 4.0

Netzpolitik.org is a German language news website on digital rights and digital culture. Among other topics, it covers mass surveillance, open source software, data protection and privacy and net neutrality. The blog was founded in 2002 by Markus Beckedahl, who led the project until July 2022 and still works on the project today, supported by more than 30 other contributors. Since August 2022, Netzpolitik.org is led by two co-editors-in-chief Anna Biselli and Daniel Leisegang.

== 2015 treason investigation ==
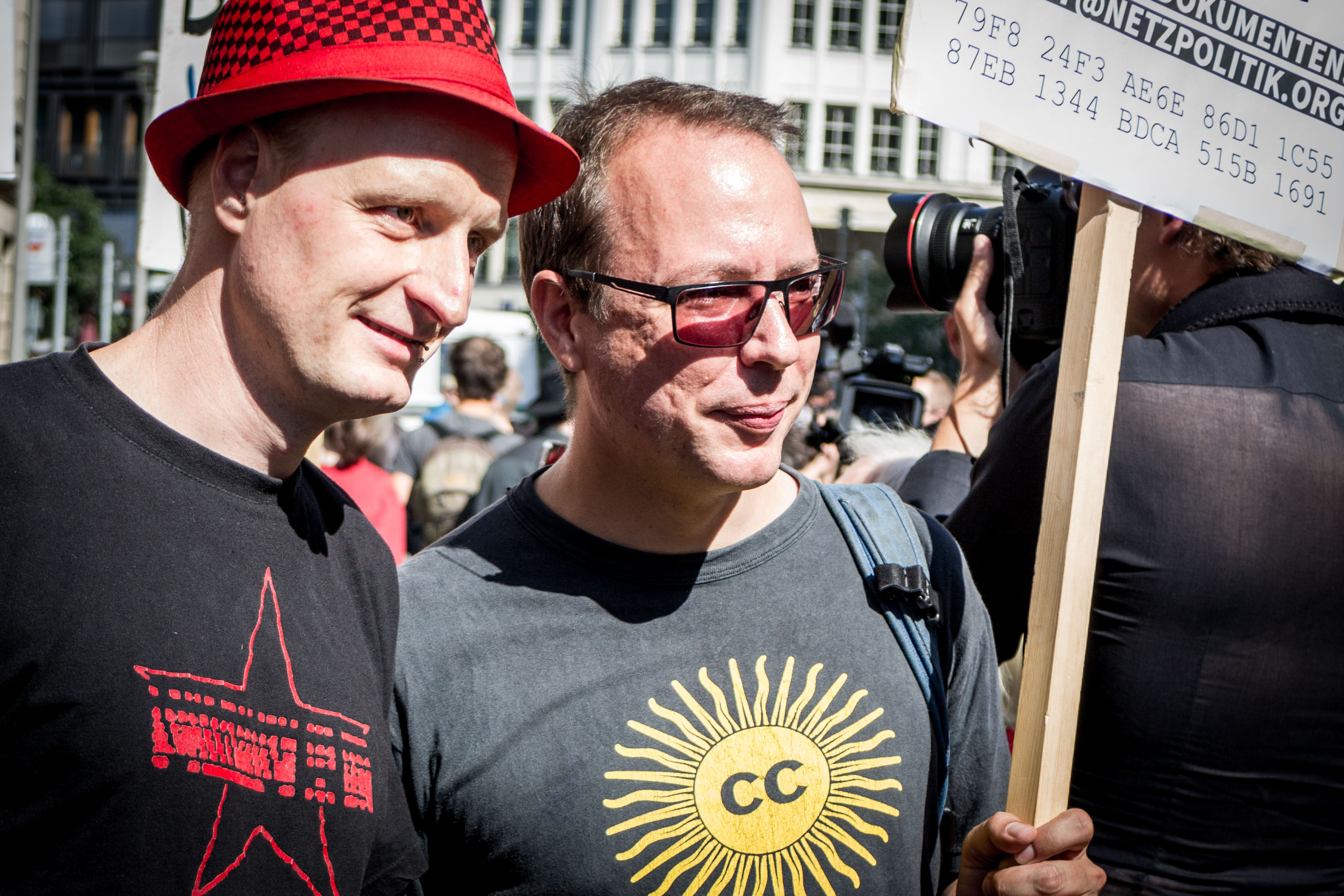
Netzpolitik.org authors Markus Beckedahl (right) and Andre Meister (left) at protest against treason investigations in Berlin, August 2015

In spring 2015, Netzpolitik.org leaked internal government documents which detailed the proposed surveillance expansion of social networks by the Federal Office for the Protection of the Constitution, an intelligence agency, by producing two articles, first in February 2015 and then in April 2015.

On July 31, 2015, Netzpolitik.org announced:

Today, we received a letter from the Federal Attorney General of Germany confirming ongoing investigations against our reporters Markus Beckedahl, Andre Meister and an "unknown" source, suspecting us of treason according to the German Penal Code.

Up until that point, they were known to have been witnesses in the case, but this letter confirmed that they would be investigated as "joint principals".

In the aftermath of the treason investigation, Federal Minister of Justice Heiko Maas forced Public Prosecutor General Harald Range into retirement for breach of public trust on 4 August 2015.
