= Holger Stahlknecht =

German politician (born 1964)

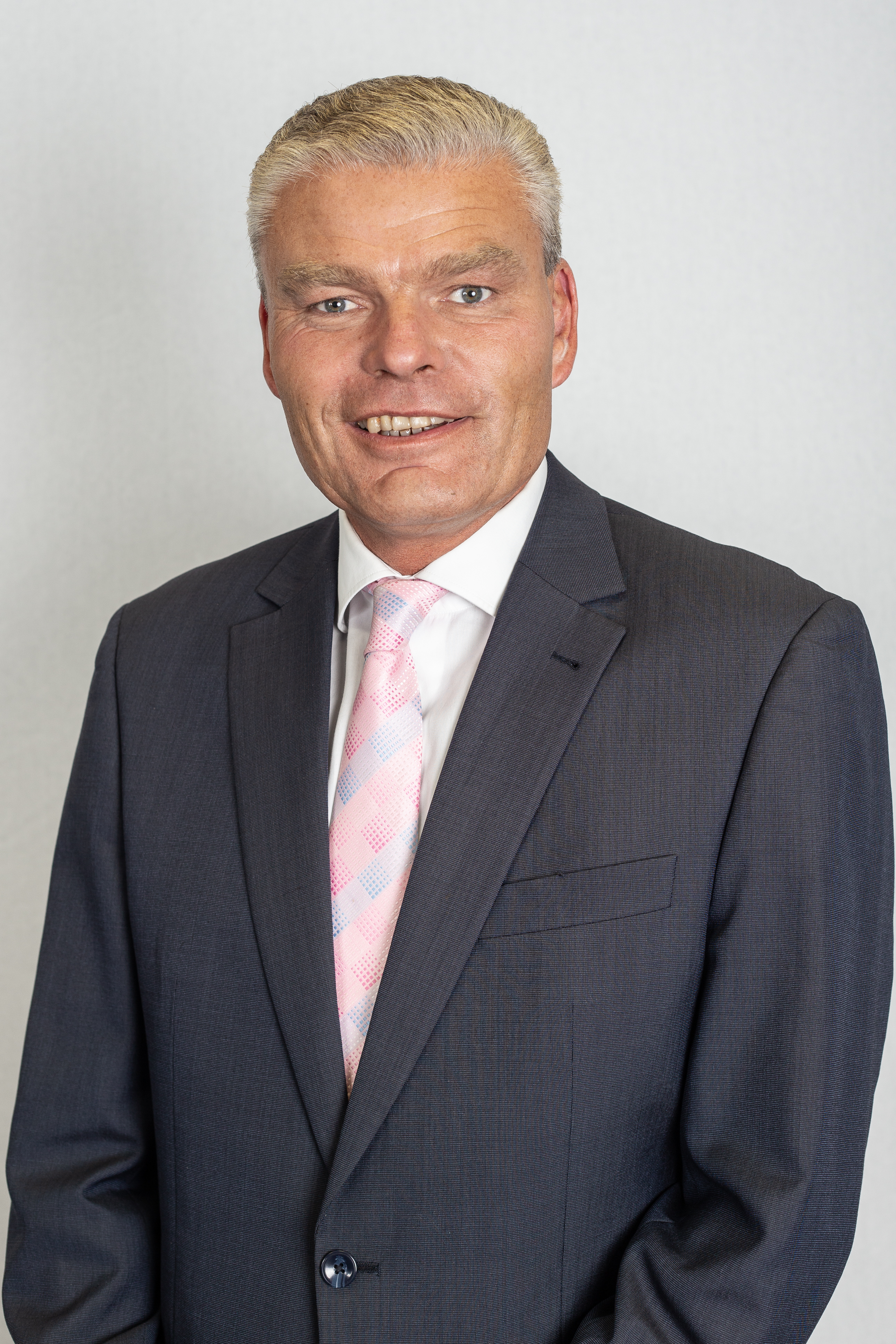
Stahlknecht in 2018

Holger Stahlknecht (born 13 November 1964) is a German lawyer and politician of the CDU who was the State Minister of Internal Affairs in the government of Minister-President Reiner Haseloff of Saxony-Anhalt from 2011 until 2020.

== Early life and education ==
Stahlknecht was born in 1964 in Hanover and studied law at Osnabrück University and Hochschule Magdeburg-Stendal.

== Political career ==
Stahlknecht joined the CDU in 2000. After various positions in local politics, he first became a member of the Landtag of Saxony-Anhalt in the 2002 state elections, representing the Börde district.

From the 2011 state elections, Stahlknecht served as State Minister of Internal Affairs in Saxony-Anhalt. As one of the state's representatives at the Bundesrat since 2011, he was a member of the Committee on Internal Affairs and of the Defence Committee.

In 2018 Stahlknecht was elected chairman of the CDU in Saxony-Anhalt.

== Other activities ==
- Mitteldeutsche Basketball Marketing GmbH, Member of the Advisory Board
