= Wireless Emergency Alerts in Germany =

There are various Wireless Emergency Alerts in Germany which inform citizens about important incidents, disasters and dangerous situations, as well as severe weather. Since February 2023, the alerts of the four main systems have been shared and disseminated in parallel.

== Background ==
German civil defence siren, public warning signal

Since WWII, the traditional method for informing the public about a disaster in Germany has been civil defence sirens. An equivalent to the US Emergency Broadcasting System for sending messages via radio and TV did not exist in Germany for a long time but such a system is now part of the Modular Warning System (MoWas). MoWas is developed by the Federal Office for Civil Protection and Disaster Relief (BBK) to warn the population and is coupled to authorities, media and all situation centres of the state governments and their redundancy locations as well as in all integrated control centres in North Rhine-Westphalia, Brandenburg and Schleswig-Holstein. The system is connected to all public broadcasters, a number of private broadcasters, the news agencies dpa, AFP, dts Nachrichtenagentur, the digital billboards of Ströer Media and Wall GmbH, T-Online International, the situation room of Deutsche Bahn and all relevant alert apps.

== Cell Broadcast ==
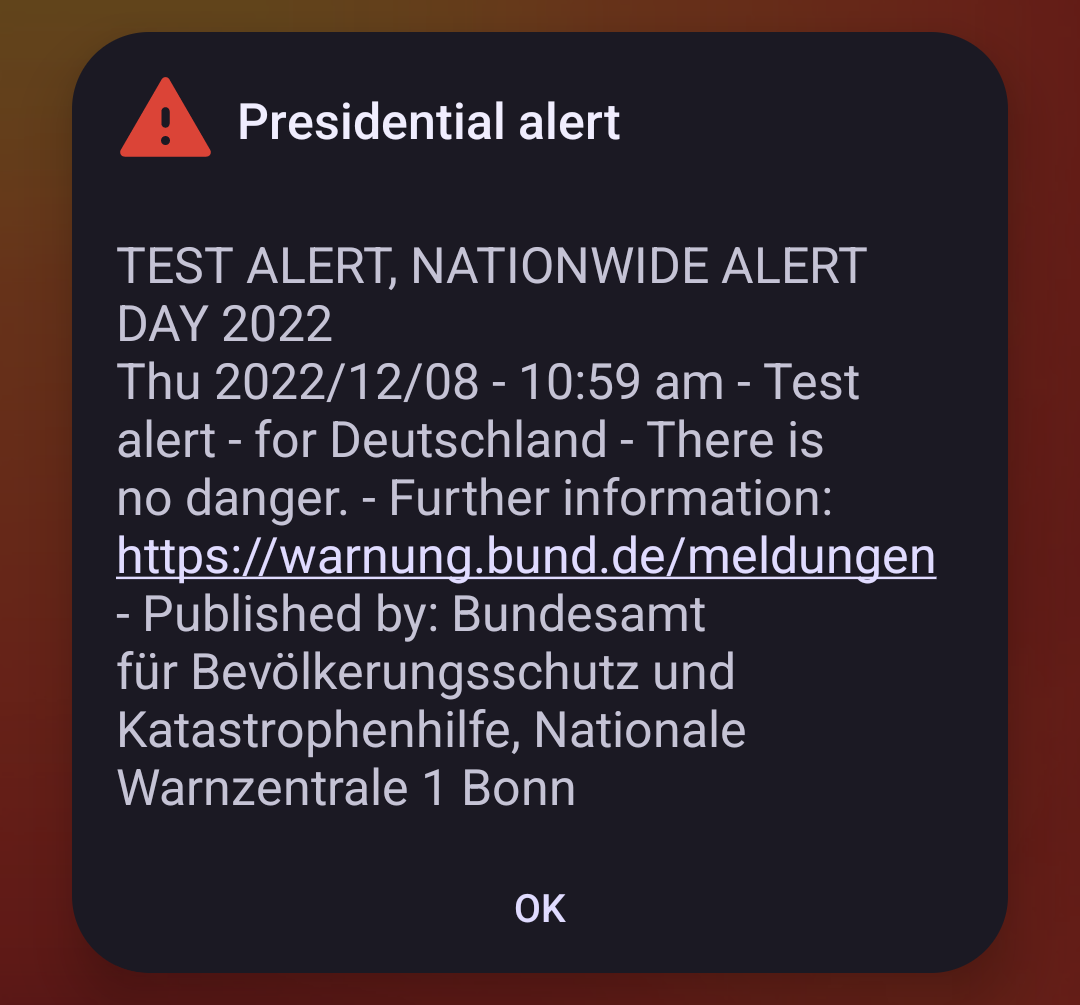
Cell broadcast test in Germany on December 8, 2022

There were increasing calls to use the Cell Broadcast service in Germany to warn the population in the event of a disaster. The demands intensified after the Floods in Western and Central Europe in 2021.

In August 2021, the German federal government announced that it would introduce Cell Broadcast within the next year. The Bundestag and Bundesrat subsequently approved the necessary amendment to the Telecommunications Act. The Bundesrat approved the introduction of the mobile warning regulation of the Federal Ministry for Economic Affairs and Climate Action on November 26, 2021. On the second nationwide warning day on December 8, 2022, cell broadcast was successfully used in Germany for the first time. The message was intended to reach all mobile devices that are compatible with Cell Broadcast and have reception.

In February 2023, the Cell Broadcast warning system officially started regular operation. In June 2023, mobile phone operator Vodafone Germany announced that since the start of official operation, 77 warning messages had been sent via Cell Broadcast in various parts of Germany.

== NINA ==
NINA Logo

In 2015, the Federal Office for Civil Protection and Disaster Relief (Bundesamt für Bevölkerungsschutz und Katastrophenhilfe) at BMI presented an emergency information and news app called NINA. Since 2019, the KATWARN system and the Federal MoWaS system have been coupled: warnings of KATWARN and the NINA app are displayed on both sides.

== EU-Alert ==
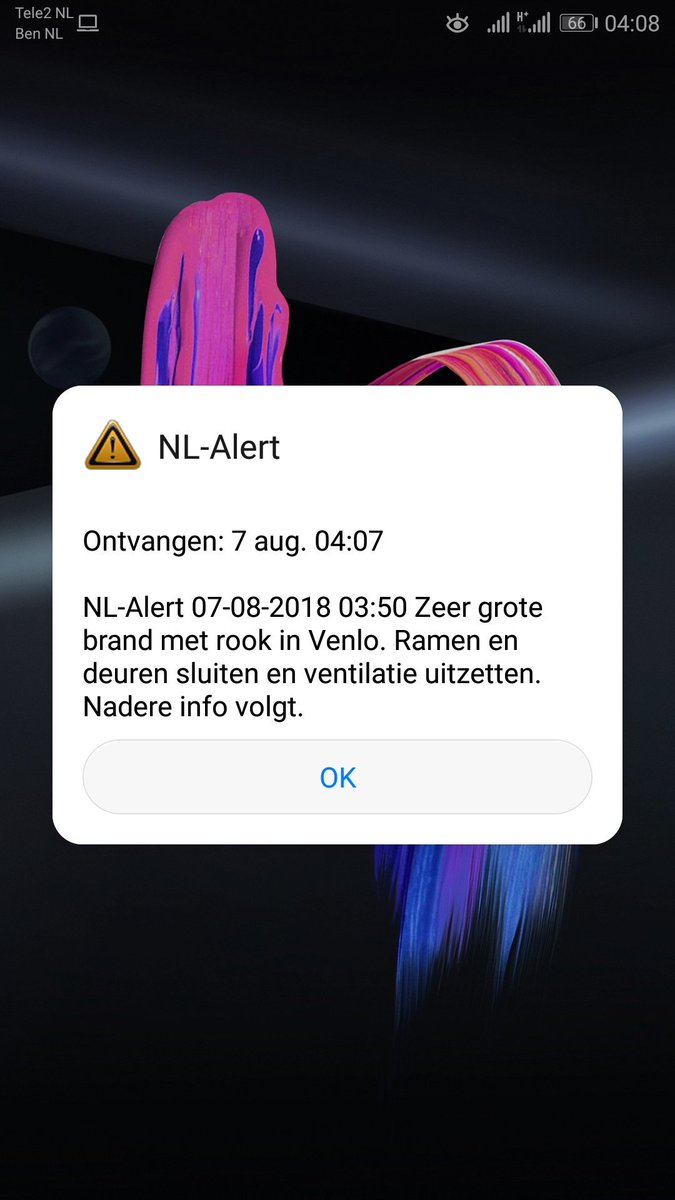
EU-Alert/NL-Alert Cell Broadcast message in the area of Venlo, The Netherlands on 7 August 2018 as a result of a large toxic fire

EU-Alert is the wireless emergency system of the European Union and officially called European Public Warning Service. EU-Alert is compatible with the Wireless Emergency Alerts (WEA) standard as used in the United States and based on Cell Broadcast. Since 2012, mobile operating systems have supported EU-Alert/WEA/CMAS via Cell Broadcast for public warning messages by default.

== Katwarn ==
Katwarn Logo

Katwarn was the first alert system in Germany based mainly on smartphone apps and was introduced in 2009. The service is provided by the private company Combirisk GmbH. Fraunhofer Institute FOKUS developed Katwarn on behalf of the major insurance companies in Germany.

Katwarn (also known as KATWARN) is an alert and information system that informs the affected citizen in disasters and dangerous situations (e.g. large fires, power outages, bomb finds). Since 2011, Katwarn has been in use in Germany in various cities, counties and city states, as well as at the state (Bundesländer) and federal level. It can be used, for example, via a smartphone app. Registration to the system is free and it currently serves around 2.5 million users. The app is available worldwide in the app stores for iPhone, Android and Windows Phone.

Since July 2017, Katwarn has also been available in Austria.

== BIWAPP ==
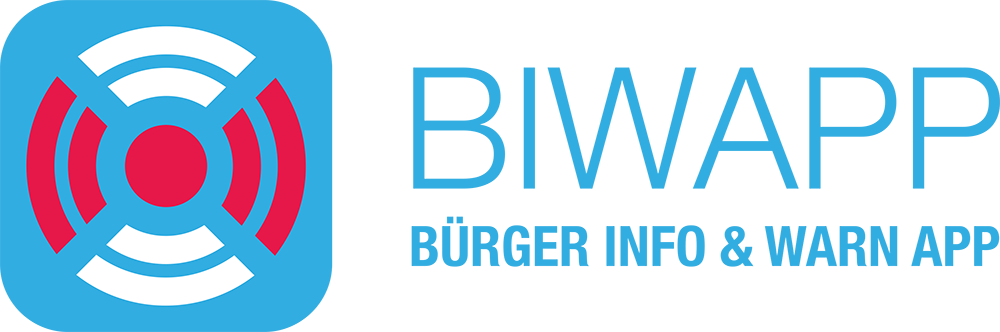
BIWAPP Logo

The warning app BIWAPP is used by some cities and counties for regional and local urgent reports. The app also displays the disaster warnings of the BBK and the severe weather warnings of the German Weather Service (DWD). All notifications and disaster alerts are sent directly from the officially responsible institutions such as civil protection authorities, municipalities and cities as well as their control centres.

== WarnWetter ==
In 2015 the German weather service (DWD) developed a weather warning app called WarnWetter. At the end of 2017 it was used by 4.9 million users. In 2017 a private weather forecast company brought suit against DWD because of its free app. After judgment by the district court of Bonn, there is a free app with commercials and another version for which users have to pay.
