= Kurt Rebmann =

German jurist (1924–2005)

Kurt Rebmann (30 May 1924 – 21 April 2005) was a German lawyer and from 1977 to 1990 'Generalbundesanwalt' (Public Prosecutor General), the highest federal prosecutor of Germany.

== Life and achievements ==
Rebmann was born in 1924 in the southwestern town of Heilbronn and studied law from 1943 to 1950 at the University of Tübingen. Rebmann became Public Prosecutor General on 1 July 1977 as the successor of Siegfried Buback who fell victim to an assassination by militants of the Red Army Faction (RAF). After with Hanns Martin Schleyer the president of the Confederation of German Employers' Associations, was sequestrated by RAF militants in September 1977, he was in favor of a retroactive implementation of the death penalty. In 1989, he was a leading force behind the implementation of a crown witness rule. He stayed in the post of a Public Prosecutor General until 1990.
