= Iranian American Women Foundation =

Nonprofit organization

- Motto: "Inspire. Empower. Connect."
- Founder: Mariam Khosravani
- Established: 2010
- President: Mariam Khosravani
- Location: Washington, D.C., New York City, Orange County, San Francisco, U.S.
- Website: www.iawfoundation.org

The Iranian American Women Foundation (IAWF) is an Iranian-American national nonprofit membership organization. Members of all faiths are allowed to join. Muslims, Jews, Christians and those of the Bahá'í religion are involved in the organization.

== History ==
In 2010, Mariam Khosravani sought to form an organization to highlight the accomplishments of Iranian American women.

== Activities ==
Since its inception, the Iranian American Women Foundation has hosted their annual Women's Leadership Conference in various cities across the United States. In 2022, the IAWF bought advertising in major US cities to raise awareness for women's rights in Iran including the death of Mahsa Amini.
