= Public Prosecutor General (Germany) =

Federal prosecutor of Germany

Coordinates: 49°00′05″N 8°23′07″E

Public Prosecutor General of the Federal Republic of Germany
- Der Generalbundesanwalt beim Bundesgerichtshof
- Attorney General logo
- Incumbent; Jens Rommel
- Seat: Karlsruhe, Baden-Württemberg
- Nominator: Federal Minister of Justice
- Appointer: President of Germany
- Constituting instrument: Gerichtsverfassungsgesetz (Jurisdiction Act)
- Inaugural holder: Carlo Wiechmann
- Formation: 1950
- Website: generalbundesanwalt.de

The Public Prosecutor General at the Federal Court of Justice (German: Generalbundesanwalt or Generalbundesanwältin beim Bundesgerichtshof [GBA], lit. 'General Federal Attorney at the Federal Court of Justice') is the federal prosecutor of Germany, representing the federal government at the Bundesgerichtshof, the federal court of justice. The office of the Public Prosecutor General is located in Karlsruhe. Besides its role in appellate cases, the Public Prosecutor General has primary jurisdiction in cases of crimes against the state (in particular terrorism, espionage and treason), and offences under the Völkerstrafgesetzbuch (genocide, crimes against humanity and war crimes). The Public Prosecutor General also represents Germany in certain civil and administrative cases.

The Federal Minister of Justice proposes the Public Prosecutor General with the approval of the Federal Cabinet to the President of Germany for appointment. The Public Prosecutor General is considered a political official. He is supposed to share the criminal and security policy views and objectives of the respective acting federal government and can be recalled without cause at any time. He is subject to the supervision of the Federal Minister of Justice.

In 1977, then-Public Prosecutor General Siegfried Buback was assassinated by an extremist left-wing group, the Red Army Faction.

== Location, premises ==
From 1950 until 1998, the office of the Public Prosecutor General shared a building in Karlsruhe with the Bundesgerichtshof (Federal Court of Justice). Since then it is in a new building on the site of the former "Deutsche Waffen- und Munitionsfabrik" [German arms and munitions factory], now the Zentrum für Kunst und Medientechnologie (ZKM), designed by Oswald Mathias Ungers.

== Organization ==
The GBA is supported by a Deputy Public Prosecutor General at the Federal Court of Justice (Stellvertretender Generalbundesanwalt beim Bundesgerichtshof) and several Federal Prosecutors at the Federal Court of Justice (Bundesanwälte beim Bundesgerichtshof), Senior Public Prosecutors at the Federal Court of Justice (Oberstaatsanwälte beim Bundesgerichtshof) and Public Prosecutors at the Federal Court of Justice (Staatsanwälte beim Bundesgerichtshof). He has a staff of about 300, of whom about 110 are permanently assigned public prosecutors and about 50 public prosecutors or judges from the federal states, who are usually seconded for three years.

The office of the Public Prosecutor General at the Federal Court of Justice is organized as follows:

- Directorate ZS: central services (5 departments); espionage; crimes under the Foreign Trade and Payments Act, crimes under the War Weapons Control Act, international criminal law (5 departments)
- Directorate Appeals: appeals at the Federal Court of Justice (7 departments)
- Directorate TE: terrorism (11 departments)

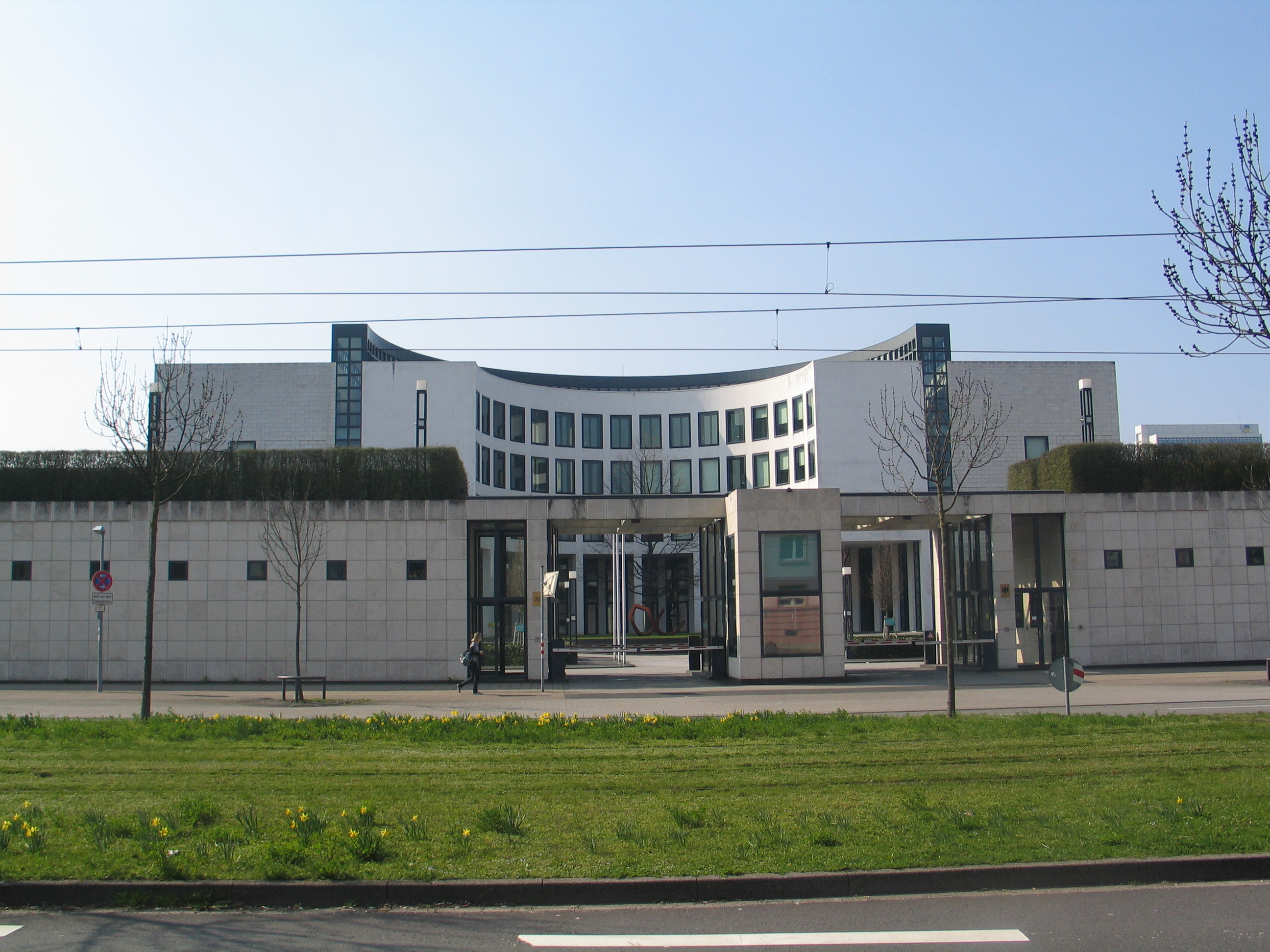
Premises of the German Public Prosecutor General in Karlsruhe

== List of Public Prosecutors General since 1950 ==
Carlo Wiechmann	1950–1956
Max Güde	1956–1961
Wolfgang Fränkel	1962
Ludwig Martin	1963–1974
Siegfried Buback	1974–1977
Kurt Rebmann	1977–1990
Alexander von Stahl	1990–1993
Kay Nehm	1994–2006
Monika Harms	2006–2011
Harald Range	2011–2015
Peter Frank	2015–2023
Jens Rommel	2024–present
