= Helmut Roewer =

German lawyer and author

Helmut Roewer (born c. 1950) is a German lawyer and author. He served between 1994 and 2000 as president of the regional office for protection of the constitution in Thuringia ("Thüringer Landesamtes für Verfassungsschutz"). This is a state-level security agency. Controversy in respect of his time in office has persisted, although he himself robustly rejects most of the criticisms of his decisions made at that time.

== Life ==
=== Early years ===
Helmut Roewer was born in Verona. He trained for service as an officer in a West German tank regiment, rising to the rank of Oberleutnant. He then went on to study jurisprudence, History and applied economics ("Volkswirtschaft"). He completed his studies to the point of passing his level two national law exams. He went on to receive his doctorate in 1982 from the University of Konstanz. His dissertation was entitled "Rechte und Pflichten junger Menschen zwischen Elternrecht und staatlicher Einflussnahme – Die Entwicklung von der Reichsgründung 1871 bis 1980" (loosely "Rights and obligations of young people between parental rights and government inputs ... 1981-1980"). Initially he then worked in public practice as a lawyer. Later he took a job in the West German Interior Ministry, working in areas involving Constitutional Protection (security) and reaching the level of a "Ministerialrat" (loosely: "permanent secretary").

=== Presidency of the "Thüringer Landesamtes für Verfassungsschutz" ===
In 1994 the Thuringian Interior Minister, Franz Schuster offered Roewer a position as president of the regional office for protection of the constitution ("Thüringer Landesamtes für Verfassungsschutz"). Roewer accepted. The written certificate of employment was apparently placed in Roewer's pocket in an Erfurt hostelry. Details of the exchange can no longer be reconstructed: Roewer later indicated that he was drunk at the time and retained only a dim recollection of what happened. There were suggestions that the manner in which Roewer carried out his responsibilities could be seen as eccentric. On one occasion he turned up to an event celebrating Weimar as a European Capital of Culture dressed in a General Ludendorff costume, complete with a spiked helmet: another time he appeared at a ceremony in a carriage dressed up as Walther Rathenau. On Roewer's watch a number of people believed to be linked to right-wing radicalism in the area were recruited as informants. An example was Tino Brandt, at that time a commander in the Thurinigian Homeland Protection League and a member of the regional executive of the National Democratic Party (" Nationaldemokratische Partei Deutschlands" / NPD). Between 1994 and 2001 Brandt received more than 200,000 Marks for his services, money which by his own account went to the Homeland Protection League. Brandt himself was at one stage delisted, on account of his extremist involvement, by Roewer. In 1998 three members of the Neo-Nazi scene in the area disappeared "underground". That became more significant during the next ten or so years, as the three were identified as "Nazi underground" suspects in connection with a long list of murders of Turkish and Greek immigrants, the murder of a police officer in Heilbronn, terrorist explosions and a number of bank robberies.

Commenting on 15 November 2011. Roewer stated that back at the time "because of numerous operation in process, and of the [quantity of] papers involved, it is possible that individual clues [which should have been] recognised were not". In a letter to Interior Minister Jörg Geibert, Roewer wrote that there had been a "very strong suspicion" (eine "sehr ernste Vermutung") of irregularities in the local police department as a result of which "information from there to the [suspects] in question could have passed" ("dass Informationen von dort an die Betroffenen abfließen könnten"). He thought connections between the terror cell involved and police in Jena could have already prevented an arrest as early as 1998. In February 2013 Roewer took his argument a little further, stating that his office had opened an investigation against the police. When pressed for more details he said that the files from his time in office had probably been destroyed, however.

Under Roewer's leadership the "Thüringer Landesamtes für Verfassungsschutz" (security service) was far more worried about the dangers of left-wing extremism than those of right-wing extremism. An educational film produced for schools in 2000 characterised left-wing autonomists as ready to commit violence, while marches in the streets of right wingers were identified as reassuringly comradely affairs. A statement was included from the Thurinigian Homeland Protection League leader, Tino Brandt, "We are essentially against violence" ("Wir sind […] prinzipiell gegen Gewalt"), completely without further elaboration or challenge. That film was commissioned by the short-lived Heron Verlagsgesellschaft ("Heron Publishing Company") – described in one source as a "Tarnverlag" ("camouflage publisher") – which had been set up by Roewer himself, albeit using "Stephan Seeberg" as a cover name! The contract for the film's production went to the ambitious young media-savvy CDU activist, Reyk Seela. Roewer justified his unconventional approach to commissioning and producing the educational film by explaining that it had facilitated the incorporation of film-clips and images provided from the "radical right-wing scene".

Another contentious aspect of Roewer's time in charge at the "Verfassungsschutz" office concerned the massive gathering of material on the opposition politician Bodo Ramelow. It never became clear why this had been done. In October 2013 the (national) Federal Constitutional Court found the surveillance under which Ramelow had been placed had been unconstitutional.

In 2000 the Interior Minister, Christian Köckert, asked the former judge and Secretary of state at the Hessian Justice Ministry, Karl Heinz Gasser, to conduct an enquiry into Roewer's conduct of his office. Gasser's report was devastating. Roewer's personnel appointments had been appalling, both in terms of leadership and of organisational structure, in the course of his reconfiguration of his office between 1994 and 1999. He had placed school leavers in leadership positions which had created conditions of permanent conflict between experienced intelligence administrators and their new bosses. An example was cited of an experienced official who had criticised a decision of his boss as nonsensical, and been personally sanctioned by Roewer who had ordered him to provide an hour by hour record of his working day. Professional supervision by the Interior Ministry was effectively blocked for almost a year while Roewer failed to report on his activities to the minister, instead reporting solely to the minister's predecessor, Richard Dewes. No minutes or other report of those discussions were provided to the responsible oversight board regarding the content of the information provided by Roewer at his meetings with Dewes. There was also criticism of the current Interior Minister, Christian Köckert, for having failed to react to a letter from the personnel office warning of the chaotic situation in the "Verfassungsschutz" office under Roewer's direction.

While that was going on there was also a commission of enquiry in place, which had been set up by the Landtag of Thuringia, into the activities in the area of the National Socialist Underground, and which came up with repeated criticism of the way Roewer's office was carrying out its security brief. The point was made that where he found one of his section heads impossible to handle, he should have immediately dismissed such an individual.

=== Retirement and criminal proceedings ===
In 2000, as a result of "more than sixty matters", Helmut Roewer was suspended from office by the minister-president, Bernhard Vogel. A criminal investigation was launched in 2005 in respect of suspected malfeasances during his time as president of the regional office for protection of the constitution ("Thüringer Landesamtes für Verfassungsschutz"). However, the investigations were suspended in 2008 due to "long-standing unfitness" ("fortdauernder Verhandlungsunfähigkeit") provisions. In 2010 a deal was concluded with the Erfurt district court as a result of which the criminal proceedings were permanently halted and Roewer, by this time described as an "author, living in Weimar and Italy" paid 3,000 Euros to an agreed charity.

=== NSU affair ===
Despite the threat of criminal conviction having been lifted, Roewer was still called upon to testify to parliamentary commissions of enquiry into the handling of the National Socialist Underground affair ("NSU murders"). As a witness he was neither willing nor co-operative: at one stage, in an interview reported in 2013, Roewer compared his appearances before one enquiry commission to a Stalinist show trial. He filed two criminal complaints against former colleagues on grounds of alleged false testimony.

Summononed to testify before the first Bundestag (i.e. national parliamentary) committee of enquiry into the National Socialist Underground murders, Roewer was asked about an invoice that had been found for a payment to someone identified as "V-Mann Günther" ("trusted informant Günther") Instead of attempting to answer the committee member's question, Roewer replied "Was geht Sie das an?" (loosely "What business is that of yours?") There had in fact been several payments to "V-Mann Günther", and Roewer's dismissive reaction on being quizzed about the matter encouraged speculation that he could have had reasons of his own for apparently holding back from giving direct answers on the topic. He told the committee that attempts had been made by the service during his time in charge of it to organise false passports for Uwe Böhnhardt, Uwe Mundlos and Beate Zschäpe in order to have them arrested as they left Germany. These three were the terrorist suspects whose allegedly murderous activities during the first decade of the twenty-first century had triggered the parliamentary enquiry. Roewer's testimony that Thuringian "Verfassungsschutz" officers had engaged in drinking sessions with right-wing extremists in order to extract information from them failed to impress his questioners or media commentators. Roewer nevertheless strongly rejected suggestions that he had become a protector for the NSU suspects. Roewer had originally declined to appear before the committee of enquiry because he was ill. When the committee demanded a medical certificate, he turned up to the hearings, but armed with a certificate from a doctor indicating that he needed a fifteen-minute break every 30–45 minutes. In the end he testified without those regular breaks. His relationship with the committee evidently remained starkly confrontational, however. The committee chairman, Sebastian Edathy went on record with the opinion that Roewer's memory lapses in response to questioning were "simply not believable" ("schlicht nicht glaubwürdig").

=== Author, journalist and pundit ===
Roewer still sustains a significant public profile, with regular media appearances. He contributes to Jürgen Elsässer's monthly Compact magazine and as an author for Ares-Verlag. He strongly rejects charges that this publishing firm is a platform for right-wing extremists, antisemites and historical revisionists. He points out that he has found his former tutor, Ingo von Münch, on its list of authors, asserting that a publishing house that is good enough for the respectable von Münch is good enough for him. Roewer also contributes to Junge Freiheit and is involved at a senior level with the Dresden-based Veldenstein Circle ("Veldensteiner Research Group on Extremism and Democracy" / "Veldensteiner Kreis zur Erforschung von Extremismus und Demokratie").
