= PC Records =

German record label

- Founded: 2000
- Founder: Hendrik Lasch
- Genre: Neo-Nazi rock, RAC
- Country of origin: Germany
- Location: Chemnitz

PC Records is a German Neo-Nazi music label. It is an artistic outlet for the Chemnitz Neo-Nazi scene and one of the most active of the far-right and Rock Against Communism music scene in Germany. PC Records is releasing some of the most regionally popular Neo-Nazi bands. Several of the albums released by the label have been banned in Germany for neo-fascist content. The label includes a shop and a mailorder business. The name "PC" refers to the phrase "Political Correctness, no thanks!"

According to the Office for the Protection of the Constitution (Landesamt für Verfassungsschutz Sachsen), PC Records "has a high reputation in the right-wing extremist scene at home and abroad. Its turnover is estimated at several hundred thousand euros per year. The profits enable business owners not only to make a living, but also to finance and promote scene activities."

The founder of PC Records, Hendrik Lasch, was well connected with National Socialist Underground (NSU) member Uwe Mundlos in the 1990s. Lasch promoted a T-shirt, made to raise money to support the three Neo-Nazi activists of NSU, who hid from the police.

The album Adolf Hitler Lives by Gigi & Die Braunen Stadtmusikanten was released on PC Records in 2010. It features the song "Döner-Killer", in which Daniel Giese praises the series of murders committed by the NSU.

== Bands ==
Featuring around 200 rock album releases from 2000 to 2014, PC Records is one of the most active far-right labels in Germany. With numerous solo samplers, the label finances activities of the neo-fascist scene and its protagonists. The label has released music from the following bands:

- Aryan Brotherhood
- Arische Jugend
- Act of Violence
- Blitzkrieg, Chemnitz
- Brutal Attack, UK
- Die Lunikoff Verschwörung (follow-up project of the Berlin band Landser)
- Division Germania, Mönchengladbach
- Gigi & Die Braunen Stadtmusikanten, Daniel Giese
- Heilige Jugend
- Kodex Frei
- Sacha Korn
- Sleipnir
- Stahlgewitter
- Sturmwehr
- Skalinger
- Ungebetene Gäste
