= List of attacks by the National Socialist Underground =

This is a list of attacks by the National Socialist Underground (NSU), a neo-Nazi terrorist group that existed in Germany.

Date	Location	Type	Fatalities	Injuries	Note(s)
23 June 1999	Nuremberg, Bavaria	Pipe bombing	0	1	In 1999, an 18-year-old employee at a Nuremberg bar sustained injuries to his upper body when he accidentally detonated a pipe bomb disguised as what appeared to be a flashlight. The incident occurred in a bar owned by a Turkish immigrant.
9 September 2000	Nuremberg, Bavaria	Small arms fire	1	0	Murder of Enver Şimşek: Enver Şimşek was a 38-year-old business man with Turkish roots who operated several flower stalls in southern Germany. When his employee running the stall in Nuremberg went on holidays, Şimşek himself stepped in for him, and in the afternoon of 9 September 2000 he was shot in the face by two gunmen, and died from his wounds in hospital two days later. One of the guns used to kill Şimşek was used in nine more murders.
19 January 2001	Cologne, North Rhine-Westphalia	Mail bombing	0	1	In January 2001 NSU perperated a bombing in front of a grocery store in Cologne which heavily injured the 19-year-old daughter of the owner.
13 June 2001	Nuremberg, Bavaria	Small arms fire	1	0	On 13 June 2001, Abdurrahim Özüdoğru was killed by two shots in the head with the same weapon already used in the murder of Enver Şimşek. Özüdoğru, who worked as a machinist for a company in Nuremberg, had been helping out in a tailor's shop; the murder was discovered by a passer-by who looked through the shop window and saw the body sitting in the back of the shop, covered in blood.
27 June 2001	Hamburg	Small arms fire	1	0	On 27 June 2001 between 10:45 and 11:15 a.m, Süleyman Taşköprü, aged 31, died in his greengrocer's shop in Hamburg-Bahrenfeld after being shot in the head three times.
29 August 2001	Munich, Bavaria	Small arms fire	1	0	On 29 August 2001 Habil Kılıç became the fourth victim. Kılıç, aged 38, who was married and had a daughter, was shot at point-blank range in his greengrocer's shop in Munich-Ramersdorf.
25 February 2004	Rostock, Mecklenburg-Vorpommern	Small arms fire	1	0	In Rostock-Toitenwinkel, on the morning of Ash Wednesday, 25 February 2004, between 10:10 and 10:20, Mehmet Turgut was shot three times in the head and neck with a silenced CZ 83 and died instantaneously. Turgut, who had been living illegally in Hamburg, was in Rostock on a visit and had been asked by an acquaintance to open up a doner kebab shop that day.
9 June 2004	Cologne, North Rhine-Westphalia	Nail bombing	0	22	2004 Cologne bombing: On 9 June 2004, a nail bomb detonated in Cologne, Germany, in a business area popular with immigrants from Turkey. Twenty-two people were wounded, with four sustaining serious injuries. A barber shop was completely destroyed; many shops and numerous parked cars were seriously damaged by the explosion and by the nails added to the bomb for extra damage. Authorities initially excluded the possibility of a terrorist attack. The bomb, which contained more than 800 nails, was hidden in a travel compartment on a bicycle left in front of the barber shop. 22 Turks were injured as a result of the bombing.
9 June 2005	Nuremberg, Bavaria	Small arms fire	1	0	On 9 June 2005 the murderers struck for the third time in Nuremberg. İsmail Yaşar, aged 50, had come from Suruç, Turkey to Nuremberg, and owned a kebab shop in Scharrerstrasse. He was found dead at approximately 10:15 with five gunshot wounds. Witness statements led Police to believe he had been killed between 9:50 and 10:05.
15 June 2005	Munich, Bavaria	Small arms fire	1	0	On 15 June 2005 between 18:15 and 19:00 locksmith Theodoros Boulgarides was killed in his shop in the vicinity of the other murder in Munich. Boulgarides left a wife and two daughters.
4 April 2006	Dortmund, North Rhine-Westphalia	Small arms fire	1	0	In Dortmund, in the early afternoon of 4 April 2006, kiosk vendor Mehmet Kubaşık, a German citizen of Turkish origin, was found dead in his shop. Kubaşık had been shot in the head.
6 April 2006	Kassel, Hesse	Small arms fire	1	0	On 6 April 2006, just two days after the murder of Kubaşık, Halit Yozgat became the penultimate victim in the series of murders, and the last of ethnic Turkish origin. Yozgat, who ran an Internet café in Kassel, Hesse, was also shot in the head with a silenced gun. On the occasion of this murder an agent of the Hessian Office for the Protection of the Constitution was present. The agent claimed first to have left the premises shortly before the murder, but later changed his statement when presented with evidence of witnesses who had seen him present when the murder happened. His involvement with the case gave rise to suspicions that government agencies might be linked to the organisation responsible for the murders.
25 April 2007	Heilbronn, Baden-Württemberg	Small arms fire	1	1	Murder of Michèle Kiesewetter: On 25 April 2007, police officer Michèle Kiesewetter and her duty-partner were attacked during their lunch break. Kiesewetter, age 22, was killed and her partner was critically wounded but survived with no memory of the attack. Both were shot involving directly aimed headshots at point blank range while sitting in the patrol car with the shooters approaching their vehicle from both sides. Kiesewetter died on site; her male partner was in a coma for several weeks. While in the other cases the motive is assumed to be xenophobia and/or racism, it is unclear why Kiesewetter and her partner were attacked; theories include a variety of motives, such as a personal link between Kiesewetter, who came from Oberweißbach in Thuringia, and the alleged perpetrators who all came from Thuringia, or the acquisition of firearms. The duty-pistols of Kiesewetter and her partner were found on 4 November 2011 at the caravan where Böhnhardt and Mundlos died, giving rise to the belief that this attack was linked to the Bosphorus murder series.
