= 2004 Cologne bombing =

Bombing in a Turkish area of Cologne, Germany

Coordinates: 50°57′57″N 7°00′31″E

2004 Cologne bombing 2004 bombenanschlag auf Köln
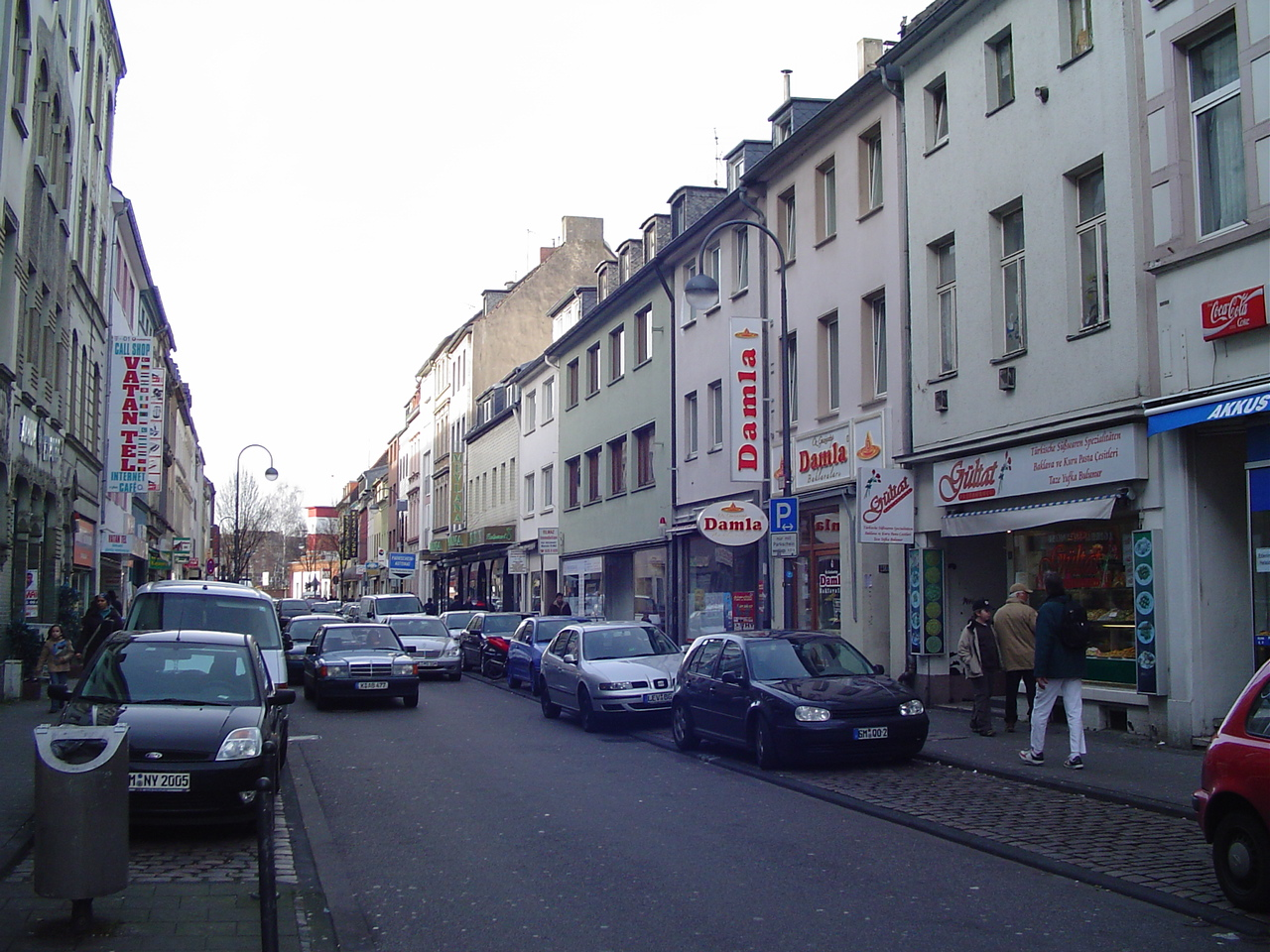
- Keupstraße

- Cologne (North Rhine-Westphalia) Cologne (Germany)
- Location: 22 Keupstraße, Cologne, Germany
- Date: 9 June 2004
- Target: Turks
- Attack type: Bombing; Terrorist attack
- Weapon: nail bomb
- Deaths: 0
- Injuries: 22
- Perpetrator: National Socialist Underground
- Motive: Islamophobia; Racism; Xenophobia; Anti-Turkism

On 9 June 2004, a nail bomb detonated in Cologne, Germany, in a business area popular with immigrants from Turkey. Twenty-two people were wounded, with four sustaining serious injuries. A barber shop was destroyed; many shops and numerous parked cars were seriously damaged by the explosion and by the nails added to the bomb for extra damage. Authorities initially excluded the possibility of a terrorist attack. The bomb, which contained more than 800 nails, was hidden in a travel compartment on a bicycle left in front of the barber shop.

In November 2011, after having been accused by authorities of being responsible for a robbery in Eisenach, the neo-Nazi terrorist group National Socialist Underground (Nationalsozialistischer Untergrund) released a video claiming responsibility for the Cologne bombing.

The group’s main members, Uwe Böhnhardt, Uwe Mundlos, and Beate Zschäpe, were also indicted with the killing of nine businessmen of Turkish and Greek origin between 2000 and 2006 (the National Socialist Underground murders) and the murder of Michèle Kiesewetter in 2007. Böhnhardt and Mundlos died in a murder-suicide, leaving only Zschäpe to be charged (among other charges) for the attempted murder of 23 people in the Cologne bombing, in the NSU trial.

The events of the 2017 film In the Fade, starring Diane Kruger as a German woman whose Kurdish husband and their child were killed in a nail bomb attack by Neo-Nazis, was inspired by the 2004 bombing.

== See also ==
- Oktoberfest bombing
- Hanau shootings
- Murder of Michèle Kiesewetter
- National Socialist Underground murders
- Birlikte
