= Khubaib-Ali Mohammed =

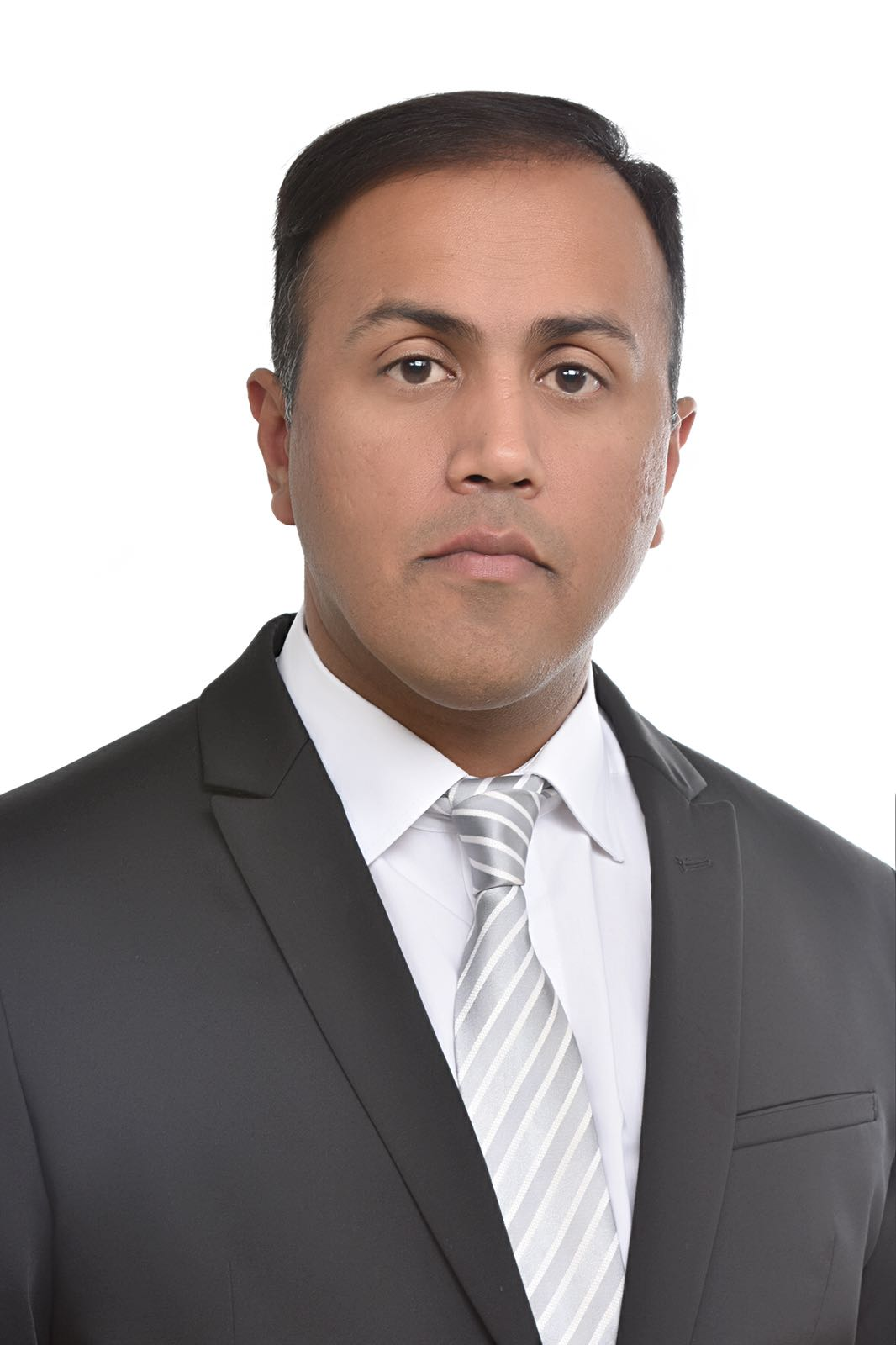
- Born: August 1, 1981 (age 45)
- Occupation: Criminal Defense Lawyer
- Known for: National Socialist Underground Trials

Khubaib-Ali Mohammed (born 1 August 1981) is a German criminal defense lawyer with Pakistani roots.

== Life ==
Mohammed studied at the Free University of Berlin and in Baden-Baden. Since 2010 he has been working as a criminal defense lawyer. Since 2013 he is mainly focused on victims' rights. Mohammed was the defence lawyer for the victims in several well-known cases in recent German history. He is known as a specialist for delicate cases.

== Cases (selection) ==
=== 2013–2018: National Socialist Underground ===
Mohammed represented some of the victims of the National Socialist Underground (NSU) in the trial of Beate Zschäpe and other accused. Zschäpe was sentenced to life imprisonment.

=== 2013: Representation of Somalia ===
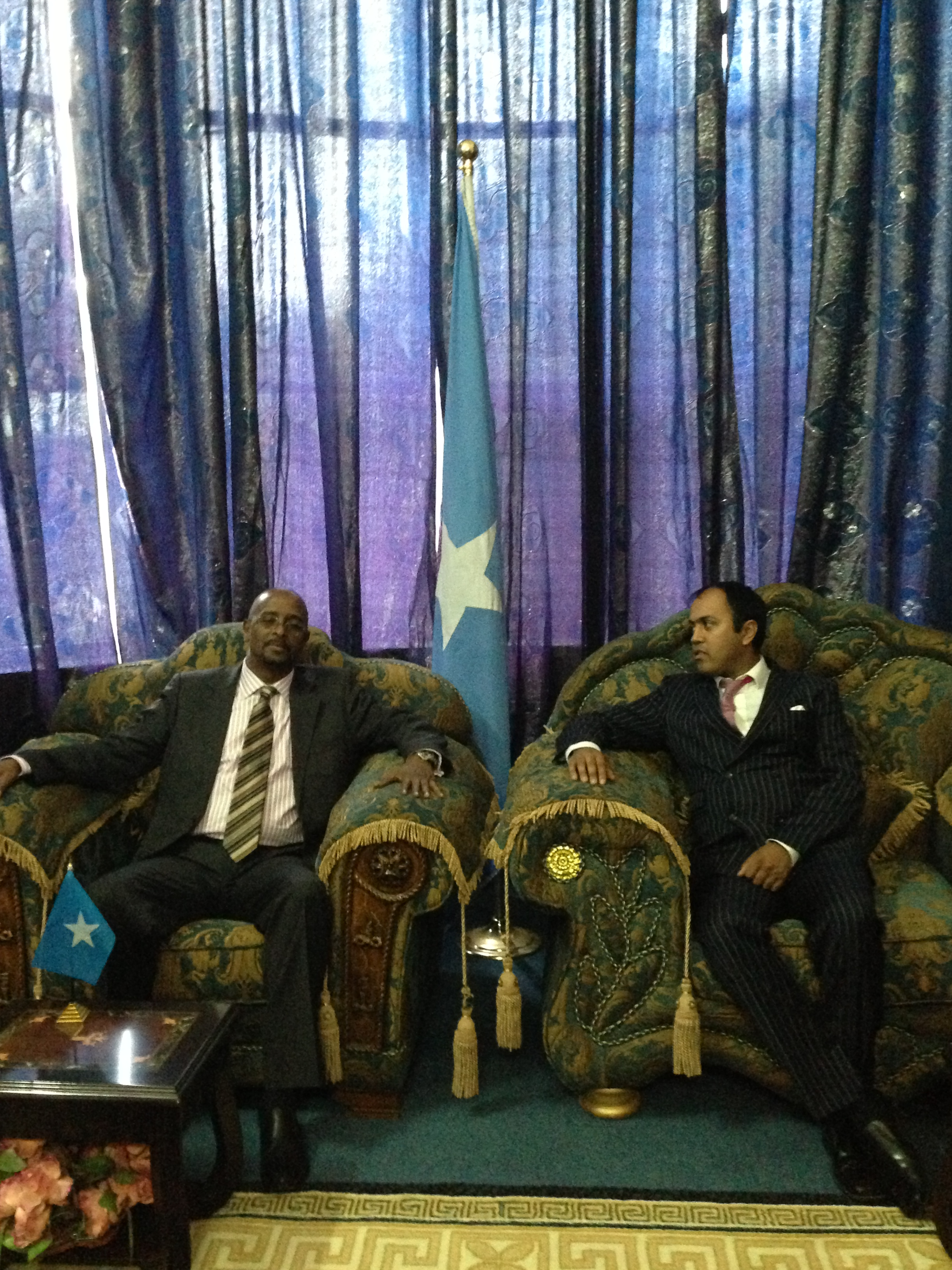
Hassan Sheikh Mohamud and Khubaib-Ali Mohammed (Villa Somalia, 2013).

Mohammed appeared before the International Tribunal for the Law of the Sea as selected adviser of the Republic of Somalia on behalf of the then Somali president Hassan Sheikh Mohamud.

=== 2016: Silvio S. ===
Mohammed represented the family of the Bosnian refugee child Mohamed as a lawyer for the victim in the trial of the alleged child murderer Silvio S. The Potsdam District Court sentenced the perpetrator to life imprisonment in 2016 but did not order preventive detention. In June 2017 the Federal Supreme Court set aside the judgment of the Potsdam District Cort in regard to this point and ordered a new trial. The sentence of life imprisonment is thus final. The re-examination of the Potsdam District Court regarding the preventive detention is still pending.

=== 2016: Reinhold Hanning and Oscar Gröning ===
In the Nazi Auschwitz trials of the erstwhile guard Reinhold Hanning and the "concentration camp bookkeeper" Oskar Gröning, Mohammed appeared as representatives of some of the victims.

=== 2017: Attack at Breitscheitplatz ===
In the proceedings brought about due to the ISIS attack on the Berlin Christmas market at the Kaiser Wilhelm Memorial Church Mohammed represented numerous victims. He demanded that a special fund containing 100 million euros be set up for the victims of the terrorist attack and that they be guaranteed unbureaucratic compensation, as well as a thorough investigation of the case.

=== 2017: Love Parade disaster in 2010 ===
At the trial about the accident at the Love Parade in 2010, that resulted in multiple deaths and injuries, Mohammed was part of the team that represented the victims and their families. During the event numerous safety prescriptions were not complied with and the visitor numbers were badly calculated.

=== 2018: Cancer drug scandal in Bottrop ===
Muhammed and Schulz represented the victims of Bottrop pharmacist Peter S., who was accused of watering down cancer treatments. The pharmacist was sentenced in July 2018 to twelve years imprisonment.

=== 2019: Rebecca ===
Mohammed was the attorney of Rebecca, a teenage girl who disappeared in 2019 in Berlin. There have been no results to investigations.

=== 2020: State torture in Syria ===
In the case against two former members of Syria’s secret police Mohammed were part of a team of plaintiffs. The defendants are accused of crimes against humanity, rape and murder.
