= Murder of Enver Şimşek =

Murder of Turkish-born businessman on 11 September 2000

Enver Şimşek (4 December 1961 – 11 September 2000) was a Turkish-born businessman in Germany who was the first victim of the series of murders by the National Socialist Underground (NSU) terrorist group. The owner of a flower shop in Schlüchtern in Hesse, he was gunned down on 9 September 2000 at a mobile flower stand in Nuremberg. Two days later he died in a hospital as a result of injuries sustained in the attack.

== Life ==
Enver Şimşek immigrated to Germany from Turkey in 1985. He first worked in a factory and then started his own flower shop. This eventually grew into a flower wholesale business which served several shops and flower stands.

A few years before his murder, Şimşek became more religious, took part in Hajj with his wife and donated money to the local Islamic community. He considered opening a Quran school in Schlüchtern and sent his children to a religious boarding school.

Enver Şimşek was married and the father of two children, Semiya and Abdulkerim.

== Death ==
On 9 September 2000, Şimşek was operating a flower stand in Nuremberg. This was unusual, as he normally only delivered goods for sale at the stand. On this day, however, he had taken over sales at the stand while the normal operator was on vacation.

Eight shots were fired at Şimşek between 12:45 pm and 2:15 pm. He was transported to hospital and died two days later without ever regaining consciousness. Forensic examination of projectiles and shell cases demonstrated that two different weapons had been used: a pistol of caliber 6.35 mm, type not identifiable, and a pistol of the Česká 83 type, caliber 7.65 mm.

The crime scene was located in the Langwasser district of Nuremberg.

== Trial ==
The family of Enver Şimşek was represented by Seda Başay-Yıldız in the National Socialist Underground trial.

== Commemoration ==
At the central memorial event of the Federal Republic in honour of the NSU victims in the Berliner Schauspielhaus on Gendarmenmarkt, Şimşek's daughter Semiya Şimşek spoke with Mehmet Kubaşık's daughter, Gamze, and stated that she had "not even been permitted to be a victim with a clear conscience" for eleven years". Semiya Şimşek chronicled the story of her family's suffering after the death of her father and the interactions by the investigators with relatives in her 2013 book Schmerzliche Heimat: Deutschland und der Mord an meinem Vater ("Painful Homeland: Germany and the murder of my father"), which became the basis for the 2016 ARD television film NSU German History X: Die Opfer – Vergesst mich nicht ("The Victims - Don't forget me").

To commemorate all NSU murder victims, including Şimşek, a stele was erected in Nuremberg in 2013. At the scene of the crime, a plaque in his memory was installed in September 2014 at the initiative of residents. The unveiling of the plaque was attended by his widow, who visited the place for the first time. The plaque was later stolen by unknown persons and the group "Das Schweigen durchbrechen" (Breaking the Silence) installed a sign with a picture of showing Şimşek.

In Zwickau in Saxony, the last place where the core trio of the NSU lived underground, a European oak was planted on 8 September 2019 in memory of Enver Şimşek on the Ziegelwiese in the northern part of the Swan Pond Park. Only a few weeks later, the tree was cut down by unknown persons. The mayor of Zwickau, Pia Findeiß, spoke of the "intolerance, a lack of understanding of democracy and contempt for victims of terrorism and their relatives" demonstrated by this act. One week later, a wooden bench with an inscription placed in memory of Şimşek was also destroyed. Barbara John, ombudsperson for NSU victims appointed by the German government, regards this as evidence for existence of networks that approve of the murders. Ten new memorial trees were planted and memorial plaques were installed in the same place on 3 November 2019, though criticism was raised over misspellings of Şimşek's name and the failure to invite survivors and relatives.

In March 2020 the city of Jena decided after a lengthy discussion to name a place in Jena-Winzerla, where the perpetrators of the NSU grew up, after Enver Şimşek. In mid-September 2020, the opening of the "Enver-Şimşek-Platz" was attended by family members of Şimşek as well as minister-president Bodo Ramelow and additional politicians.
