= NSU German History X =

2016 German TV miniseries

- Genre: Historical drama
- Starring: Anna Maria Mühe, Albrecht Schuch, Sebastian Urzendowsky
- Country of origin: Germany
- Original language: German
- No. of seasons: 1
- No. of episodes: 3

Production
- Running time: 91 minutes

Original release
- Network: Netflix
- Release: 2016

NSU German History X is the American name for the 2016 German TV miniseries Mitten in Deutschland: NSU.

== Synopsis ==
The three-part series dramatizes the true events and characters of the National Socialist Underground, a neo-Nazi German terrorist group that was uncovered in November 2011.

== Episodes ==
The story is told through three ninety-minute episodes. The first one shows how Beate Zschäpe became involved in the group, along with Uwe Mundlos and Uwe Böhnhardt. Episode two focuses on the victims of their terror campaigns, and the last episode presents the police investigation that ultimately uncovered and thwarted the group.

1. Die Täter – Heute ist nicht alle Tage (directed by Christian Schwochow)
2. Die Opfer – Vergesst mich nicht (directed by Züli Aladağ)
3. Die Ermittler – Nur für den Dienstgebrauch (directed by Florian Cossen)

== Release ==
The show was licensed and syndicated by Netflix for US audiences in 2017, but in July 2020, it was removed.

== See also ==
- American History X
