= Stahlgewitter =

German rock band

- Origin: Germany
- Genres: Hard rock; heavy metal; Oi!; Rock Against Communism
- Years active: 1995–present
- Labels: Freie Meinung Göttingen; W & B Records; PC Records
- Members: Daniel Giese; Andreas Koroschetz; Frank Krämer

Stahlgewitter is a German hard rock and Rock Against Communism group founded in 1995. Despite the genre's name, RAC song lyrics rarely focus on the specific topic of anti-communism. Rather, RAC lyrics typically feature nationalist themes. Stahlgewitter is listed by the group 'Netz gegen Nazis' (Network Against Nazis) as one of the more popular contemporary Rock Against Communism groups. This categorises Stahlgewitter in amongst other more historical Rock Against Communism groups such as the English band Skrewdriver which played a lending role in the formation of RAC and the fellow German band Landser who are now deemed a "criminal gang organisation" in Germany.

== Lyrics ==
For their supposed Nazi ties, the band has been investigated by the German police for supporting hate speech. The band is listed as a hate group for these reasons by the US organisation the Anti-Defamation League. However, the band's lyrics never directly attack or demean any race or nationality, which then means it is not categorised as hate speech outside of Germany. This has led to the band's music being used to create fan-made music videos which then can be uploaded to YouTube without censorship.

Stahlgewitter's lyrics, however, do promote extremism by promoting and praising National Socialism or organisations that were under the German Nazi party, who engaged in crimes against humanity through the means of both genocide and democide. In their lyrics, they complain about "Zionist-occupied governments" as well pay homage to today's neo-Nazis as "political soldiers" by proclaiming them to be today's Sturmabteilung (SA) or "Brownshirts", a paramilitary organisation of the Nazi party that played a key role in Adolf Hitler's rise to power in the 1920s and 1930s.

One example is the praise in their song "Ruhm und Ehre der Waffen SS" of the Waffen SS who committed numerous war crimes, particularly civilian massacres (see Waffen-SS § Criminality).

Original German lyrics	English translation
Ich weiss dass ihr sie nie vergesst, Ruhm und Ehre der Waffen-SS, Ich weiss dass ihr sie nie vergesst, Ruhm und Ehre der Waffen-SS	I know that you will never forget them Honor and glory for the Waffen SS I know that you will never forget them Honor and glory for the Waffen SS

== Discography ==
- 1996 – "Das eiserne Gebet"
- 1998 – "Germania"
- 2001 – "Amalek"
- 2002 – "Politischer Soldat"
- 2003 – "Germania über alles"
- 2006 – "Auftrag Deutsches Reich"
- 2008 – "Politischer Soldat – Neuauflage"
- 2013 – "Das Hohelied der Herkunft"
- 2013 – "Stählerne Romantik" (MCD)

== Literature ==
=== German ===
- Christian Dornbusch/Jan Raabe (Hrsg.): RechtsRock. Bestandsaufnahme und Gegenstrategien. Unrast Verlag, Münster 2002, ISBN 3-89771-808-1
- Antifaschistische Infoblatt-Autoren: White Noise. Einblicke in die internationale Neonazi-Musik-Szene. Unrast Verlag, Münster 2004, ISBN 3-89771-807-3
