= Murder of Michèle Kiesewetter =

German police officer (1984–2007)

- Part of the National Socialist Underground murders
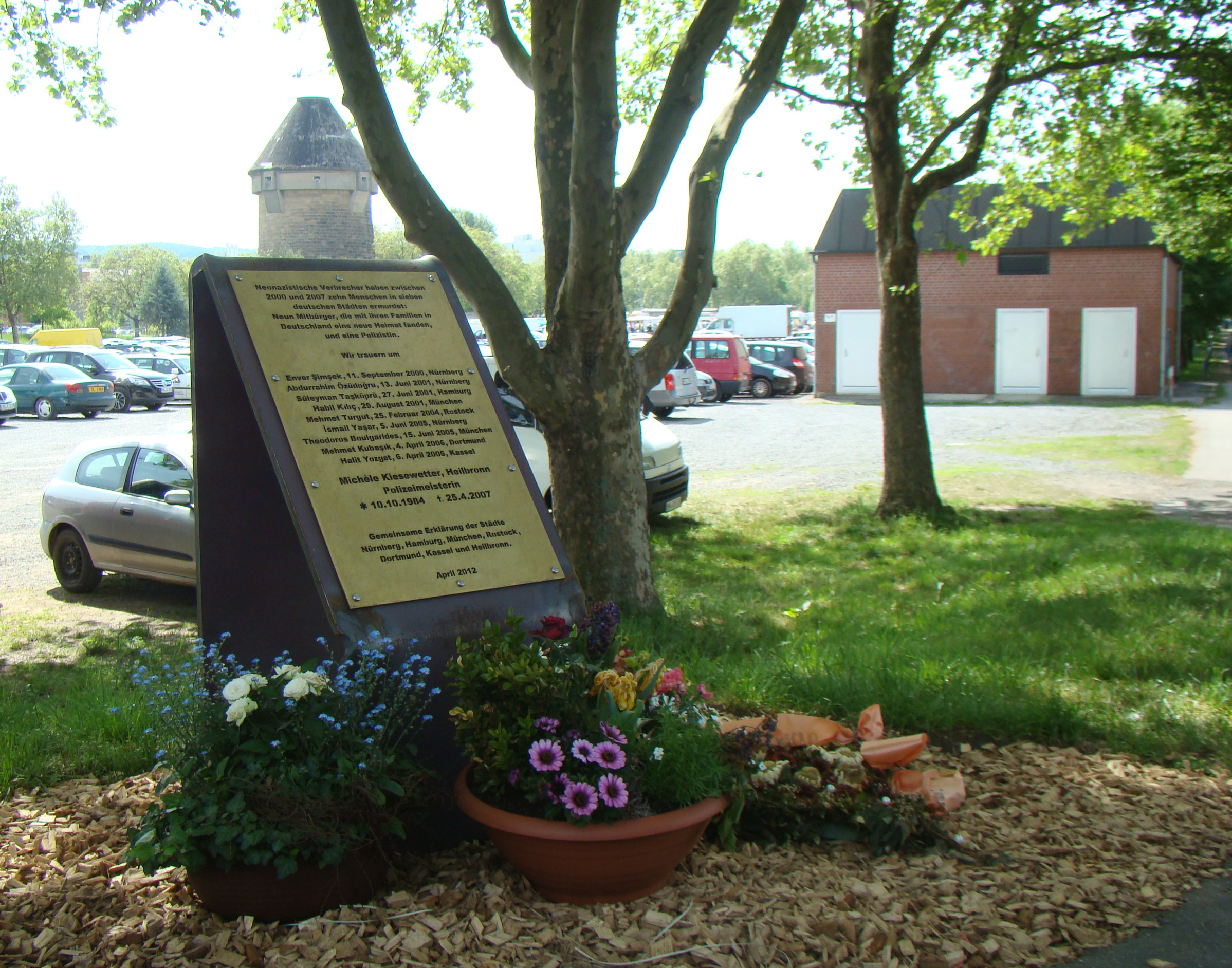
- Commemorative marker near the site of Kiesewetter's murder
- Location: Heilbronn, Germany
- Date: April 25, 2007
- Weapon: Guns
- Deaths: 1
- Injuries: 1
- Victim: Michèle Kiesewetter

Michèle Kiesewetter (10 October 1984 – 25 April 2007) was a German police officer who was killed by National Socialist Underground terrorists.

== Background ==
Kiesewetter was born in Neuhaus, Thuringia, growing up with her mother and step-father in nearby Oberweißbach, where she attended primary school. She was a member of biathlon and fair clubs in her hometown. In 2002, Kiesewetter applied with Baden-Württemberg Police, having been inspired for the job since childhood by her uncle, who worked for state security (Staatsschutz; ST) in the BKA. She was accepted in 2003 and began training as Bereitschaftspolizei in Biberach.

== Murder ==
On 25 April 2007, Kiesewetter took a shift from a colleague on an off-duty day. She was on patrol in Heilbronn with her colleague, 24-year-old Martin Arnold when at 14:00, they stopped in a corner of a large parking lot on the Theresienwiese to have a lunch break. Shortly after, both officers were ambushed and shot in the head by two gunmen, approaching from behind the vehicle.

Kiesewetter, sitting in the driver's seat, was fatally injured. Her partner, sitting in the passenger's seat, was badly injured, but survived the attack. When the police and the ambulance arrived on the scene, both officers were lying on the ground, next to their car, and their handguns and handcuffs were stolen. The gunmen have also been implicated in the murders of nine other people, most with Turkish roots, between 2000 and 2006, the so-called NSU murders.

== Aftermath ==
Following Kiesewetter's death, the investigation focused on the so-called Phantom of Heilbronn. The investigations were concentrated in a special task force "parking lot" at the Heilbronn police department. In January 2009, the reward for clues regarding the whereabouts of the person was increased to €300,000.

Kiesewetter's service pistol, a Heckler & Koch P2000, was later retrieved, along with that of her colleague, when Uwe Böhnhardt and Uwe Mundlos, two leaders of the neo-Nazi organization National Socialist Underground (NSU), committed suicide in Eisenach on 4 November 2011, revealing the connection to the "Bosphorus murders". Forensic experts also found traces of DNA on evidence recovered from among the remains of the flat where the two of them lived with a third leader of the organization, Beate Zschäpe, at Zwickau that further strengthen the link.

Kiesewetter's murder, having been the final of the NSU murders, was considered a crime of opportunity for the sole purpose of obtaining additional firearms. However, in 2011 and later in 2014, during the NSU trial, it was revealed that Kiesewetter's family in Oberweißbach had been in conflict with a local faction of the National Democratic Party of Germany, after members of the latter outbid them in the purchase of an estate property. Between 2005 and 2006, the estate served as a meeting grounds for Thuringia's neo-Nazi scene, including Uwe Mundlos, who was spotted several times in the small town. Additionally, a pair of pants found in the burned out apartment hideout of the group had traces of Kiesewetter's blood, but forensics indicated that neither Böhnhardt or Mundlos wore it, with the possibility that Zschäpe may have also been present during the murder.

In 2025, a television movie, Die Nichte des Polizisten ("The Niece of the Policeman"), was published, heavily based on the life and death of Michèle Kiesewetter.

== See also ==
- List of unsolved murders (2000–present)
- National Socialist Underground
