= Wohlleben =

Wohlleben is a surname. Notable people with the name include:

- Peter Wohlleben (born 1964), German forester and author
- Ralf Wohlleben (born 1975), German Neo-Nazi
- Verena Wohlleben (born 1944), German politician

== See also ==
- Wohllebe
