= Regener =

Regener is a German language habitational surname for someone from Regen. Notable people with the name include:

- Erich Regener (1881–1955), German physicist
- Michael Regener (born 1965), former singer of the neo-Nazi music group Landser
- Sven Regener (born 1961), German musician and writer
