= National Socialist Underground murders =

2000s neo-Nazi serial murders in Germany

- Suspects of Bosphorus serial murders: Beate Zschäpe, Uwe Böhnhardt and Uwe Mundlos.
- Location: Across Germany
- Date: 9 September 2000 to 25 April 2007
- Target: Immigrants
- Attack type: Serial killing, hate crime
- Weapons: 7.65mm CZ 83 pistol, nail bomb
- Deaths: 10
- Injuries: 1
- Perpetrator: National Socialist Underground (Nationalsozialistischer Untergrund)

The National Socialist Underground murders (German: NSU-Mordserie) were a series of racist murders by the German Neo-Nazi terrorist group National Socialist Underground (Nationalsozialistischer Untergrund; abbreviated NSU). The NSU perpetrated the attacks between 2000 and 2007 throughout Germany, leaving ten people dead and one wounded. The primary targets were ethnic Turks, though the victims also included one ethnic Greek and one ethnic German policewoman.

Most of the victims were small business owners, including doner kebab vendors and greengrocers. They were murdered in daylight with gunshots at close range with a silenced CZ 83 pistol. According to the parents of a Turkish victim who worked in an Internet café, the police originally suspected foreign organised criminals. Policewoman Michèle Kiesewetter was also shot and killed and the police officer on patrol with her was critically wounded. Other crimes, including a bomb attack, may have been committed by the group. German authorities identified three suspects, Uwe Böhnhardt, Uwe Mundlos, and Beate Zschäpe as responsible for the murders. According to the acting Attorney General of Germany, Rainer Greisbaum, the suspects had neo-Nazi links. Böhnhardt and Mundlos were found dead by police after they robbed a bank on 4 November 2011. Police said they killed themselves. Zschäpe surrendered on 11 November 2011. She was charged with murder, attempted murder, arson, and belonging to a terrorist organization. Zschäpe said she was only willing to testify if she was considered a state witness, with mitigation of sentence. The police discovered an alleged hit list of 88 names that included "two prominent members of the Bundestag and representatives of Turkish and Islamic groups".

For years, Bavarian State Police denied that the crimes were racially motivated, blaming them on immigrant communities instead. As the right-wing connection with these crimes began to be investigated, it was discovered that sectors of German intelligence could have had links with the NSU and had prior knowledge of the nature of the killings. Large sums were paid by the intelligence service to informants, who spent the money to fund their far-right activities. Families of the victims have submitted a report to the United Nations, accusing Bavarian police of racism during the investigation.

The serial murders were previously called the Bosphorus serial murders (Mordserie Bosporus) by the German authorities, with the derogatory term Kebab murders (Döner-Morde) being frequently used by the press.

== Background ==
Beate Zschäpe (2 January 1975), Uwe Böhnhardt (1 October 1977 – 4 November 2011) and Uwe Mundlos (11 August 1973 – 4 November 2011) were the founding members of the National Socialist Underground. The three grew up in Jena, a town in the former East Germany state of Thuringia. Zschäpe met Mundlos at a local youth club while they were both adolescents and they began a romantic relationship. In 1994, the then 19-year-old Zschäpe fell in love with Böhnhardt, whom she met through Mundlos. As the 1990s continued, the three of them became involved in the far-right, neo-Nazi scene developing in the states of the former GDR. They engaged in street fights with an anti-fascist group, attended far-right concerts, and even wore home-made SS uniforms to the former Buchenwald concentration camp. Following the Fall of the Berlin Wall and the reintegration of East Germany, neo-Nazi attacks were on the rise in the states of former Eastern Germany. After becoming further radicalized, Zschäpe, Mundlos, and Böhnhardt joined the neo-Nazi group Thuringia Home Guard (Thuringer Heimatschutz).

Following a tip-off from the Federal Intelligence Service (BND), the local Jena Police Force raided a storage garage Zschäpe, Mundlos, and Böhnhardt rented in Jena in 1998. In this raid police found TNT and other bomb-making materials as well as a large amount of anti-Semitic material; however, it failed to capture Zschäpe, Mundlos, or Böhnhardt. The three went into hiding following the raid and fled to Saxony with the aid of other far-right neo-Nazi groups.

Over the following 13 years, eight Turkish-Germans, one Greek, and a German police officer were found murdered across Germany. All but one of these murders were committed using the same rare Ceska 83 pistol and witnesses described two men fleeing on bicycles. German police had little information to go on past this and had not even connected the crimes due to them being committed in different jurisdictions. Investigations carried out by the police followed several theories including that the murders were being carried out by the Turkish mafia with the Nuremberg police even going as far as setting up a fake kebab stall in order to lure out members of the Turkish Mafia. When asked about a link between the crime and neo-Nazis, the chief investigator of the Munich Murder Commission, Josef Wilfling, responded "Have you ever seen a Nazi on a bike?"

== Crimes involved ==
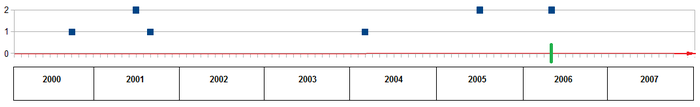
Timeline of the years when murders were committed; each square shows number of murder(s) in the particular month (if any); series ends in April 2006; green mark shows time of detention of the suspect male

Crime scenes of the Bosphorus murder series in Germany

=== Murder of Enver Şimşek ===
Enver Şimşek was a 38-year-old businessman with Turkish roots who operated several flower stalls in southern Germany. When his employee running the stall in Nuremberg went on holiday, Şimşek himself stepped in for him, and in the afternoon of 9 September 2000, he was shot in the face by two gunmen and died from his wounds in hospital two days later. He was the first victim in the series. One of the guns used to kill Şimşek was used in nine more murders.

=== Murder of Abdurrahim Özüdoğru ===
On 13 June 2001, Abdurrahim Özüdoğru was killed by two shots in the head with the same weapon already used in the murder of Enver Şimşek. Özüdoğru, who worked as a machinist for a company in Nuremberg, had been helping out in a tailor's shop; the murder was discovered by a passer-by who looked through the shop window and saw the body sitting in the back of the shop, covered in blood.

=== Murder of Süleyman Taşköprü ===
On 27 June 2001 between 10:45 and 11:15 a.m., Süleyman Taşköprü, aged 31, died in his greengrocer's shop in Hamburg-Bahrenfeld after being shot in the head three times. This was two weeks after the second murder, and the same guns as in the first case were used, a CZ 83 and a 6.35 mm gun.

=== Murder of Habil Kılıç ===
On 29 August 2001, Habil Kılıç became the fourth victim. Kılıç, aged 38, who was married and had a daughter, was shot at point-blank range in his greengrocer's shop in Munich-Ramersdorf. This was the first of two murders in Munich.

=== Murder of Mehmet Turgut ===
Two and a half years later, in Rostock-Toitenwinkel, on the morning of Ash Wednesday, 25 February 2004, between 10:10 and 10:20, Mehmet Turgut was shot three times in the head and neck with a silenced CZ 83 and died instantaneously. Turgut, who had been living illegally in Hamburg, was in Rostock on a visit and had been asked by an acquaintance to open up a doner kebab shop that day. Because of Turgut's link to Hamburg, Rostock police made the connection to the third victim, Süleyman Taşköprü, thus establishing the term döner murders.

=== Murder of İsmail Yaşar ===
On 9 June 2005, the murderers struck for the third time in Nuremberg. İsmail Yaşar, aged 50, had come from Suruç, Turkey to Nuremberg, and owned a kebab shop in Scharrerstrasse. He was found dead at approximately 10:15 with five gunshot wounds. Witness statements led Police to believe he had been killed between 9:50 and 10:05.

=== Murder of Theodoros Boulgarides ===
On 15 June 2005 between 18:15 and 19:00 locksmith Theodoros Boulgarides was killed in his shop in the vicinity of the other murder in Munich. Boulgarides left a wife and two daughters; he was the second murder victim in Munich. A Greek, he was the first non-Turk to be murdered.

=== Murder of Mehmet Kubaşık ===
In Dortmund, in the early afternoon of 4 April 2006, kiosk vendor Mehmet Kubaşık, a German citizen of Turkish origin, was found dead in his shop. Like the majority of the other victims, Kubaşık had been shot in the head.

=== Murder of Halit Yozgat ===
On 6 April 2006, just two days after the murder of Kubaşık, Halit Yozgat became the penultimate victim in the series of murders, and the last of ethnic Turkish origin. Yozgat, who ran an Internet café in Kassel, Hesse, was also shot in the head with a silenced gun. On the occasion of this murder, an agent of the Hessian Office for the Protection of the Constitution was present. The agent claimed first to have left the premises shortly before the murder, but later changed his statement when presented with evidence of witnesses who had seen him present when the murder happened. His involvement with the case gave rise to suspicions that government agencies might be linked to the organisation responsible for the murders.

=== Murder of Michèle Kiesewetter ===
On 25 April 2007, police officer Michèle Kiesewetter and her duty partner were attacked during their lunch break. Kiesewetter, age 22, was killed and her partner was critically wounded but survived with no memory of the attack. Both were shot involving directly aimed headshots at point-blank range while sitting in the patrol car with the shooters approaching their vehicle from both sides. Kiesewetter died at the crime scene; her male partner was in a coma for several weeks. While in the other cases, the motive is assumed to be xenophobia and/or racism, it is unclear why Kiesewetter and her partner were attacked; theories include a variety of motives, such as a personal link between Kiesewetter, who came from Oberweißbach in Thuringia, and the alleged perpetrators who all came from Thuringia, or the acquisition of firearms. The duty pistols of Kiesewetter and her partner were found on 4 November 2011 at the caravan where Böhnhardt and Mundlos died, giving rise to the belief that this attack was linked to the Bosphorus murder series.

== Perpetrators ==
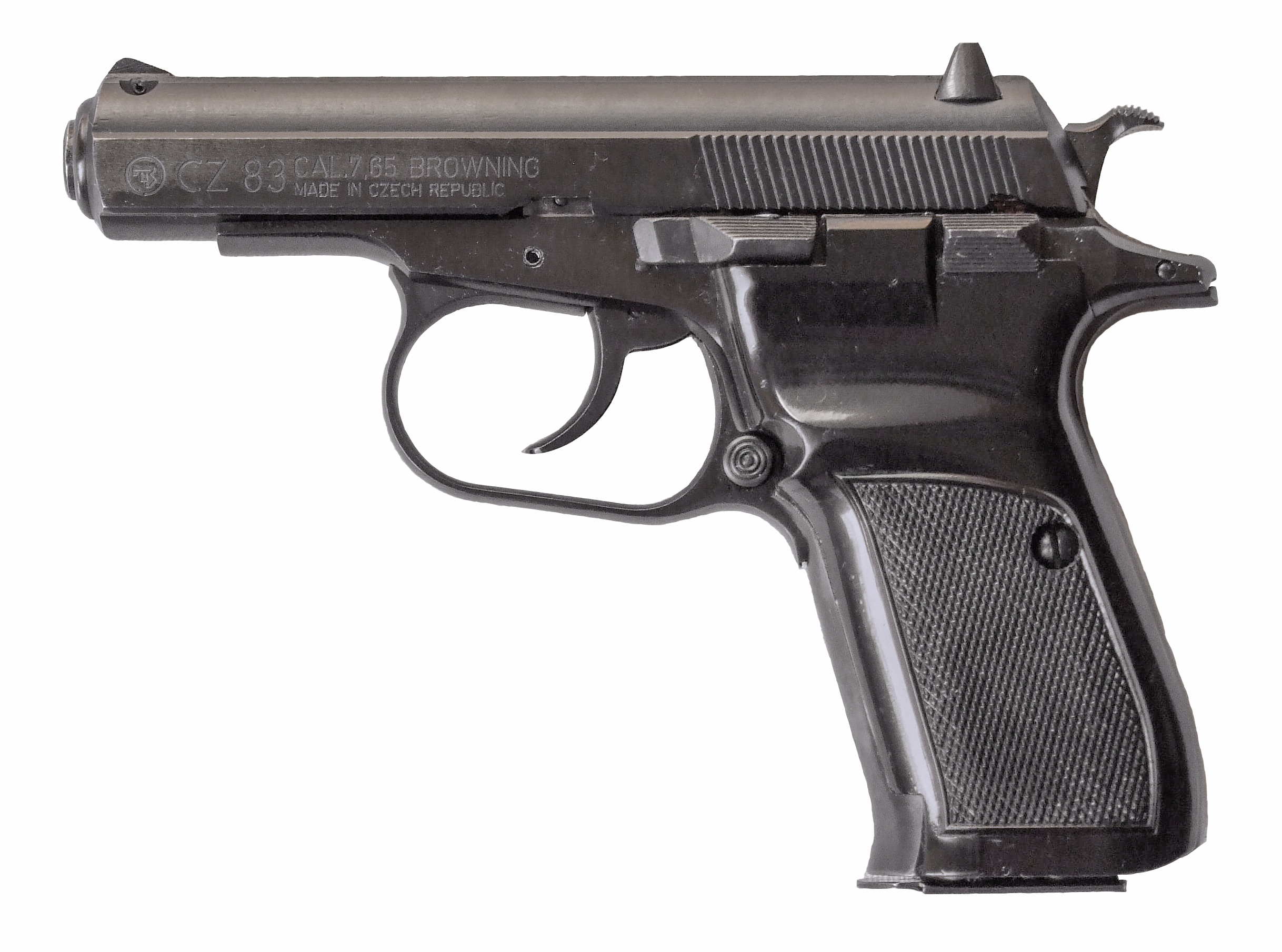
A 7.65 mm CZ 83 handgun as used for the murders

=== Original suspicions ===
Originally, suspicions surrounded the family and friends of the victims. German security services also blamed the murders on the Turkish mafia during the period of killings. Right-wing groups were never mentioned nor investigated.

== Aftermath ==
In November 2011, German Chancellor Angela Merkel stated that "the cold-blooded murders of nine immigrant shopkeepers by Neo-Nazis is an inconceivable crime for Germany and a national disgrace". In January 2012, the term "Döner-Morde" (English: Kebab Murders) was named the German Un-Word of the Year for 2011 by a jury of linguistic scholars, who considered its usage as inappropriate and inhuman. On 4 November 2016, following the recent meetings in the German parliament on the topic; Justice Minister Bekir Bozdağ of Turkey openly criticized Germany's handling of the inexcusable hatred crimes against people of non-German origin, mainly Turks. Bozdağ voiced his country's "deep concern" over the slow and vague case process.

== List of victims ==
| Name | Location | Date |
|---|---|---|
| Şimşek, Enver | Nuremberg | 9 September 2000 |
| Özüdoğru, Abdurrahim | Nuremberg | 13 June 2001 |
| Taşköprü, Süleyman | Hamburg | 27 June 2001 |
| Kılıç, Habil | Munich | 29 August 2001 |
| Turgut, Mehmet | Rostock | 25 February 2004 |
| Yaşar, İsmail | Nuremberg | 9 June 2005 |
| Boulgarides, Theodoros | Munich | 15 June 2005 |
| Kubaşık, Mehmet | Dortmund | 4 April 2006 |
| Yozgat, Halit | Kassel | 6 April 2006 |
| Kiesewetter, Michèle | Heilbronn | 25 April 2007 |

== NSU trial ==
=== Court proceedings ===
Beate Zschäpe turned herself in to the police after setting fire to the apartment that she shared with Uwe Mundlos and Uwe Böhnhardt in Zwickau, Saxony. At this time, a video began circulating amongst German media in which the cartoon character the Pink Panther linked all of the unsolved crimes to the neo-Nazi group Zschäpe, Mundlos, and Böhnhardt founded named the National Socialist Underground. The NSU murder trial began on 6 May 2013. On 13 November 2017, the trial concluded its evidence and examination phase and moved on to the closing statements phase. It ended on 11 July 2018 in a verdict of Guilty. On trial were:

- Beate Zschäpe, charged with nine murders, an attack on police leading to a further murder, arson leading to two attempted murders, as well as membership in a terrorist organization.
- André Eminger, charged with providing assistance in a nail bomb attack in Cologne.
- Holger Gerlach, charged with providing assistance to NSU members.
- Carsten Schultze, charged with providing weapons to NSU members.
- Ralf Wolleben, charged with providing weapons to NSU members.

In her defence, Zschäpe's attorneys argued that she is innocent and had no part in the murders they say were committed by Mundlos and Böhnhardt. Zschäpe maintained her silence for more than two years and told her version of the events in the form of a written statement read by one of her attorneys in December 2015. In it, she expressed regret to the victims' families that "she was unable to do anything to stop her associates from murdering their loved ones."

=== Suspicions of state complicity ===
One of the more controversial subjects to come to light during the NSU murder trial is the level of cooperation and support that neo-Nazi informants and organizations receive from the Federal Office for Protection of the Constitution (BfV), Germany's domestic security agency. The BfV began cultivating informants from Germany's neo-Nazi groups in the early and mid-1990s to deal with the rise in anti-immigrant crime like the Rostock-Lichtenhagen riots of 1992. During the trial it became clear that BfV informants were aware or potentially aware of the homicides and other crimes attributed to the NSU and that this information was not shared with local police. Reports exist that one undercover intelligence agent who harboured right-wing sympathies was at the site of one of the murders. The agent was known in the village where he grew up as "little Adolf" in his youth.

At the trial, members of the BfV admitted to shredding files on NSU informants after the crimes of the terrorist group were exposed. Families of the victims have accused the office of trying to protect the identity of informants. Criticism led to the voluntary resignation of its president Heinz Fromm in 2012.

In December 2018, five German police officers were suspended from their posts after Seda Basay-Yildiz, a Turkish-German lawyer who had defended the family of one of the victims of the NSU, was faxed a death threat against her two-year-old daughter. The fax was signed "NSU 2.0". An investigation concluded that, just before the fax was sent, a Frankfurt police computer had accessed a confidential database to obtain Basay-Yildiz's address. The phones of the police officers who were on duty at the moment were confiscated, and it was found that many were exchanging racist and far-right messages in a group chat, and posting pictures of Hitler and swastikas.

A few months before, a scandal broke out when it was discovered that special forces officers used "Uwe Böhnhardt" (after one of the NSU murderers) as a codename during a visit of Turkish President Recep Tayyip Erdoğan.

=== Police and media bias ===
Until 2011 German police and intelligence services denied the racist motivation of the murders and instead treated immigrant families as suspects, accusing the victims of being involved in the drug trade and their relatives of withholding information that could help solve the crimes. German media went along with the police line and both glibly referred to the murders as "döner killings", after a Turkish dish. As the neo-Nazi connection to the crimes was found, German media coverage of the murders was lambasted as xenophobic and dehumanizing towards the victims.

According to Amnesty International, families of the victims, and minority communities as a whole, became the target of police suspicions "despite the absence of reasonable grounds for believing that they are involved in the crimes." Theodoros Boulgarides' wife, for example, accused the police of lying to her about her husband by falsely saying he had a mistress, in a bid to convince her to confess his murder. His daughter was also asked if she ever suffered sexual abuse at the hands of her father.

The son of the first victim, Enver Şimşek, said of media coverage of his case: "First my mother was accused, then my uncle, then everyone around us was constantly under investigation. That went on for eleven years. My father wasn't treated like he was the victim; instead, he got the blame. It was the whole of the media. Whether it was the so-called 'kebab murders' of Turkish people or drug offences. The press always said my father was to blame. And that's how we felt."

Relatives of the victims submitted a report to the United Nations, accusing the Bavarian police of mishandling the case due to systemic racism.

For almost every murder in this case, the report says, testimony was provided by eyewitnesses that the perpetrators had a "German appearance," and their descriptions matched those of Mundlos and Böhnhardt. The police, however, failed to pursue that line of investigation.

The police also blamed people of the Roma community for the death of the German policewoman despite the lack of any clue in that direction. A psychological report cited by the police in the investigation of this case contains racist remarks about a Roma suspect and people from his ethnic background.

=== Verdict ===
On 11 July 2018 Beate Zschäpe was found guilty of ten counts of murder, membership in a terror organization and arson, and sentenced to life imprisonment. Her accomplices were convicted as follows:

- Wohlleben: Guilty – Convicted of aiding and abetting nine murders by procuring the pistol used. Sentenced to ten years in prison.
- Eminger: Guilty – Convicted of aiding a terror organization. Sentenced to two and a half years in prison.
- Gerlach: Guilty – Convicted of aiding a terror organization. Sentenced to three years in prison.
- Schultze: Guilty – Convicted of aiding and abetting in nine counts of murder. Sentenced to only three years of juvenile detention as he was only twenty years old at the time of the murders.

== Accomplices ==
- Ralf Wohlleben, 38, and Carsten Schultze, 33, were found guilty of being accessories to murder in the killing of the nine male victims. Prosecutors alleged that they supplied the trio with the handgun and silencer used in the killings. Wohlleben was once a member of Germany's far-right National Democratic Party, which has seats in two state parliaments in eastern Germany.
- Andre Eminger, 33, was found guilty of being an accessory in two of the bank robberies and in a 2001 bombing in Cologne. He was also found guilty of two counts of supporting a terrorist organization.
- Holger Gerlach, 38, was found guilty of three counts of supporting a terrorist organization.

Like Zschäpe, the co-defendants were known to German authorities before the existence of the NSU—whose name alludes to the official name of Adolf Hitler's National Socialist German Workers' Party—came to light.

== See also ==
- 2004 Cologne bombing
- 2011 Norway attacks
- Phantom of Heilbronn
- Birlikte
