= Hepp-Kexel-Group =

Inactive far-right German terrorist organization

The Hepp-Kexel-Group (German Hepp-Kexel-Gruppe) was a far-right terrorist gang in West Germany. The gang perpetrated bank robberies and attacks in the early 1980s; its members came from the main far-right terrorist gang of this time, the Wehrsportgruppe Hoffmann. The Hepp-Kexel group was until the self-release of the NSU as the most important right-wing terrorist group in the Federal Republic of Germany.

== History ==
In 1982, the neo-Nazi gang robbed five banks in Germany to finance later actions and captured 630,000 D-Mark. Internally, the group called itself after their leaders Walther Kexel and Odfried Hepp. Hepp was a former member of the Wehrsportgruppe Hoffmann. According to Hepp, the group wanted to attract political attention with large terrorist attacks, modeled on the IRA. Kexel and Hepp planned together with the right-wing terrorist Peter Naumann, to free the war criminal Rudolf Hess from Spandau Prison. After a row in the group, this plan was abandoned.

Instead, the Hepp-Kexel group published a paper titled Farewell to Hitlerism. They called for an "anti-imperialist liberation struggle" against the US and Israel. The group rented apartments and set up weapons depots. Following the call, three car bomb attacks on US military personnel followed in Frankfurt, Butzbach and Darmstadt.

All members, except for Odfried Hepp, were arrested in February 1983. Three members surrender to the police in Frankfurt, Kexel and another member were arrested in the same month in England. Only Hepp, who had previously moved to West Berlin, and was working for the Stasi, was able to escape the planned for February 19, 1983, arrest by the Berlin police by fleeing to East Berlin. He was taken to Syria and given a new identity.

== See also ==
- Nationalsozialistischer Untergrund, a German neo-Nazi terrorist group
- Atomwaffen Division, an American neo-Nazi terrorist group
- National Action, a banned British neo-Nazi group
