= Edith Lunnebach =

German lawyer

- Born: 1950 (age 75–76); Köln-Ehrenfeld, West Germany
- Occupation: Lawyer

Edith Lunnebach (born 1950, Köln-Ehrenfeld) is a German lawyer who has represented clients in German high profile cases such as in the Kurdish trial in Düsseldorf and NSU Trial.

== Education and early life ==
She graduated in Law in Stuttgart, Baden Württemberg in 1976, following which she worked as a jurist at the German Parity Welfare Association in Wuppertal until 1978.

In 1978 she obtained her certificate as an independent lawyer, also in Wuppertal. She moved to Cologne in 1979, and opened her lawyers office there.

== Notable trials ==
She defended Ingrid Strobl, a former editor of the feminist magazine EMMA, who was accused of having bought the clock which was used during the bombing of the Lufthansa office in Cologne by the Revolutionary Cells in 1986. During the trial, Lunnebach argued that the court could not prove that Strobl knew that the clock was going to be used in the bombing. Strobl was sentenced to five years imprisonment and released from prison in 1990.

She was a lawyer in the so called Kurdish Trial in Düsseldorf, a large trial against members of the Kurdistan Workers' Party (PKK) which lasted from 1989 to 7 March 1994, costed about 70 Mio. DM. (35 Mio. Euros) and almost 200 witnesses were called to testify. It was an exceptional trial for which the main hall was amplified in order to provide enough room for the expected seventy participants amongst prosecutors and lawyers of the defense and also for the translators needed for the trial. During the trial in Düsseldorf she was prosecuted for offending the presiding Judge Jörg Winfried Belker, but acquitted by a court in Cologne. She was again prosecuted and also fined for allegedly saying in court "And you are our Stasi". She appealed against the fine and was acquitted due to the invalidity of the courts protocol as evidence. It was the first time that a lawyer of the defense was prosecuted for an event happening in court, which was seen as an attempt to intimidate the lawyers of the defense by the prosecution. In 1991 she quit the defense at the Kurdish Trial in Düsseldorf as her client disappeared.

She was also the lawyer of the National Socialist Underground (NSU) victims of the arson attack in Cologne in 2001 during the NSU Trial. During the trial, she criticized the state prosecution for obstructing the investigation of the NSU network and that it only viewed the NSU as a cell of three people.

== Personal life ==
Edith Lunnebach is married to Arnim Gozlem.
