= Killing of Peggy Knobloch =

Unsolved murder of German schoolgirl

Peggy Knobloch
- Born: 6 April 1992; Bayreuth, Bavaria, Germany
- Disappeared: 7 May 2001 (aged 9); Lichtenberg, Bavaria, Germany
- Body discovered: 2 July 2016
- Known for: Murder victim

Peggy Knobloch (6 April 1992 – disappeared 7 May 2001) was a nine-year-old girl from Lichtenberg, Bavaria, who was kidnapped and murdered on 7 May 2001. Her body was located 15 years later in a wooded area near Wurzbach. In 2020, investigators shelved the investigation of her murder without solving it. Some newspapers refer to her as the "German Madeleine McCann".

== Background ==
Peggy Knobloch was born on 6 April 1992. At the time of her disappearance, she lived with her mother, sister, and Turkish stepfather in Lichtenberg, Bavaria. Knobloch's mother was often working when she got off the school bus, meaning she had to go to her neighbor's house until her mother came home.

== Disappearance and search ==
On 7 May 2001, Knobloch disappeared while walking home from school. She was last seen just 50 yards from her home at 1:20 p.m. carrying a Barbie doll, a satchel, and jacket. After she was reported missing, law enforcement began searching for her. Within a week of her disappearance law enforcement had searched all land within four kilometers of Lichtenberg without success. Army officers then used military aircraft equipped with specialized cameras that can detect unusual objects on the ground. However, this was also unsuccessful because the dense forests and rugged terrain made it impossible for investigators to properly analyze the photos. Two boys reported seeing Knobloch get into a red Mercedes with a Czech license plate, causing investigators to expand the search to the Czech Republic. However, they were unsuccessful in locating Knobloch or the car.

== False lead ==
In 2001, an intellectually disabled man was caught fondling a seven-year-old boy. When the man's mother interrogated him about it, he admitted to molesting Knobloch. She then attempted to get him to receive inpatient therapy. He said he molested her four days before her disappearance. The man then stated that he approached her to apologize for his earlier actions but then suffocated her after she attempted to run from him. He was involuntarily committed to a psychiatric hospital on 6 September 2001, in response to his confession before inpatient therapy could begin. After numerous police interrogations, he was arrested at the hospital in October 2002. In 2004, the man was convicted of Knobloch's murder and sentenced to life imprisonment despite recanting his confession. In 2014, his conviction was overturned after a retrial determined that his confession was coerced. He had also been repeatedly interrogated without assistance from an attorney.

== Discovery ==
On 2 July 2016, a mushroom forager found Knobloch's body in a wooded area in neighboring Thuringia after wild animals dug up her remains. The site was less than ten miles from her home.

== Later developments ==
In October 2016, police reported that DNA found near Knobloch's body was linked to the German neo-Nazi Uwe Böhnhardt. However, it was discovered that this was a false track. The DNA accidentally had been transferred to the crime scene by an unspecified piece of police equipment.

In 2018, a man was arrested after he told the police that another man led him to Knobloch's body at a bus stop, though he denied having caused her death. The man claimed to have hidden her body in the forest after failing to resuscitate her. He also told investigators that he burned her bag and jacket. However, the man was released after he retracted his confession.

Prosecutors shelved their investigation of Knobloch's disappearance in 2020.
