= Ralf Wohlleben =

German Neo-Nazi

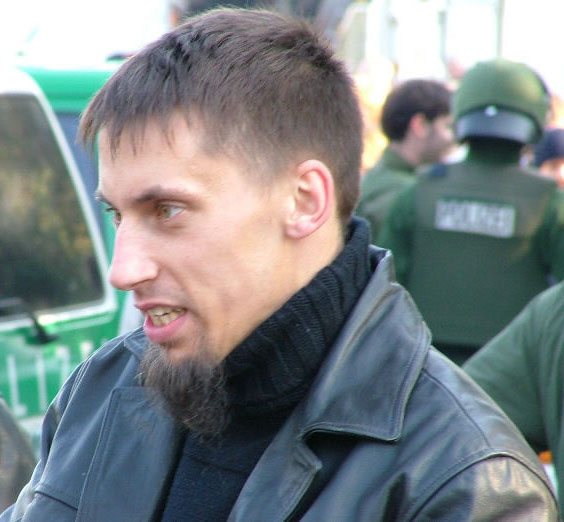
Wohlleben in 2003

Ralf Wohlleben (born 27 February 1975 in Jena, East Germany) is a German Neo-Nazi and was a supporter of the terrorist group Nationalsozialistischer Untergrund (NSU). He procured the murder weapon for the terrorist group.

Wohlleben was deputy state chairman and press spokesman of the Nationaldemokratische Partei Deutschlands (NPD) in Thuringia, and chairman of the district association of the NPD Jena. He is one of the leading Neo-Nazis in the Free State of Thuringia. On 11 July 2018, he was sentenced to 10 years in prison and released in 2026.

== Personal life ==
Ralf Wohlleben worked as an IT-specialist for system integration. Politically, he has been active since the mid-1990s. Until 1999 he was in a relationship with a woman from Jena's right-wing extremist scene. In 2014, the governmental Investigation Committee of Thuringia on the NSU stated, that the Thuringian State Office for the Protection of the Constitution (Amt für Verfassungsschutz Thüringen) temporarily procured this woman, in order to obtain information from Wohlleben. Wohlleben is now married and has two children.

== NSU ==
On 29 November 2011, the Federal Prosecutor's office arrested Ralf Wohlleben because of the murder series of the NSU in Jena. In the mid-90s he founded the "Kameradschaft Jena" together with Uwe Mundlos, Uwe Böhnhardt and Beate Zschäpe and was active with them in the so-called "Thuringian Homeland Security". With around 20 other Neo-Nazis, Wohlleben also took part in a meeting with Zschäpe and Böhnhardt during this time, in which crosses were burnt in the style of the US Ku Klux Klan.

In 1998, Wohlleben should have played a key role in the submergence of the NSU trio. As the "most important supporter" during this time, he therefore kept in touch by phone with Böhnhardt, Mundlos and Zschäpe and should have supported them financially in their flight. For this purpose, he should have given them donations from solidarity concerts and taken out a loan for them. Wohlleben's name also appeared on an address list, which could be secured by the authorities and contains 35 addresses and telephone numbers of alleged contact persons of the NSU.

In criminal matters, Ralf Wohlleben is accused of aiding and abetting the six NSU killings by "procuring a 'firearm and ammunition' to the 'NSU' in 2001 or 2002, the 'courier' on his behalf as 'NSU' members brought ". According to the Federal Prosecutor's Office, "he is said to have known about the terrorist crimes because of his persistent connection to the group living under false identity".

Wohlleben was the only alleged NSU helper who was consistently remanded during the NSU trial. The detention conditions of Wohlleben, who was remanded in Tonna, Thuringia, were tightened in early September 2012. He was said to have bypassed the post office control in prison, trying to influence witnesses and co-accused persons as well as trying to escape. Concretely, Wohlleben should have tried to contact the neo-Nazi scene, which was apparently partly successful. In October 2012 he was transferred from Thuringia to Munich.

One year after the Nazi terror series became known, the Federal Prosecutor's Office filed an indictment on 8 November 2012 against Ralf Wohlleben for aiding and abetting the murder in six cases.

Wohlleben is represented by lawyer Nicole Schneiders, who during her studies in Jena in the years 2000 and 2001, according to her own information, was a member of the NPD "for a short time", because she was of the opinion that "a defensive democracy does not need a party ban". While Wohlleben at that time was district chairman, Schneiders held the office of deputy district chairman and should also have had contacts with the free comradeship scene. In addition, Schneiders was active until its prohibition in the aid organization for national political prisoners and their relatives (HNG). The law firm Harsch and colleagues pronounced the termination to Schneiders in December 2011, due to "the enormous public pressure". Wohlleben is represented next to Schneiders by the Cottbus lawyer Olaf Klemke, a third mandatory lawyer rejected the Munich court.

From 6 May 2013 Wohlleben had to answer in court in the NSU trial. After it became known that the main defendant Beate Zschäpe wanted to get involved in the allegations in December 2015, Wohlleben's lawyers announced in November 2015 that this would also testify. In his testimony, he denied being involved in the procurement of the murder weapon and said he regretted any violent act. He concluded his statement with the words: "The relatives of the victims is my compassion."

On 11 July 2018, Ralf Wohlleben was sentenced to six years 'imprisonment for murder and sentenced to ten years' imprisonment by the Munich Higher Regional Court. At that time, he had been in pre-trial detention for six and a half years and was released. He applied to have the remainder of his sentence suspended on probation.

In November 2022, the Federal Court of Justice also rejected the request to suspend the remainder of the prison sentence on probation. The reasoning was that early release could not be justified when taking into account the public's interest in safety. That is why he was returned to custody in early 2023 to serve the remainder of his sentence.

In May 2026, he was released from custody at the Burg correctional facility in Thuringia.

During Wohlleben's imprisonment, both the Neo-Nazi Internet portal Altermedia and André Kapke and the NPD politician Karsten Höhn participated in the campaign for freedom for "Wolle", where "Wolle" is the nickname of Wohlleben.
