= Landser (band) =

German neo-Nazi band

- Origin: East Berlin, German Democratic Republic (now Berlin, Germany)
- Genre: White power music
- Years active: 1991–2003
- Past members: Michael Regener; André Möhricke; Christian Wenndorff

Landser (pronounced [ˈlantsɐ]) was a German neo-Nazi rock band. Established in 1992 in East Berlin, the band was the most popular neo-Nazi band in Germany. In 2003, the band was deemed a criminal organization by Germany and was forcibly dissolved. Its three members were convicted and the band was ordered to not regroup. Even after its banning, Landser has continued to be popular with the far-right.

== History ==
Landser was founded in East Berlin in 1992, by several people associated with the far-right biker gang Die Vandalen. Landser is an old-fashioned German colloquialism for a low-ranking soldier. Michael "Lunikoff" Regener was the band's most prominent member; he was a longtime member of the German far-right NPD party. The band self-described as "terrorists with electric guitars".

The lyrics of much of their music being illegal in Germany, their music was primarily distributed illicitly. Landser's albums were produced in London and then brought into Germany in a clandestine fashion. Their records were distributed by some individuals who were informants working for the German state and, according to the German newspaper, Die Zeit, their albums may have been produced with state funds; Die Zeit identified this as an example of Germany's heavy infiltration of far-right groups and its resulting problems.

The members of the band remained anonymous even to other participants in the far-right movement; the band members confirmed meetings with a code word and hid the routes to their meetings. To prevent neighbours from understanding their rehearsals Regener translated the most extreme lyrics into English. Live performances were similarly cautious. The band performed publicly only once, wearing masks to conceal their identities.

Landser's first album, Das Reich kommt wieder, was released on cassette in 1992. After its second album, Republik der Strolche, was released, the band attained cult popularity within the German far-right scene. It was part of the neo-Nazi music distribution network Blood & Honour.

=== Banning ===
In August 1999, during a festival in Eggesin in Germany, two Vietnamese men were beaten nearly to death by a group of neo-Nazis, who, while committing the crime, sang the chorus to a Landser song. Due to the investigation, an investigation was also opened on Landser. In October 2001, four of the band members and their producer/distributor were arrested in Germany. Regener, André Möhricke, Christian Wenndorff, and Jean-René B., members of the band, were charged, as was Jan W., their producer.

In 2003, the band was deemed a criminal organization and Regener, Möhricke, and Wenndorff were found guilty by the Berlin court of "incitement of the masses" and "spreading hate-propaganda" in addition to "forming a criminal organization". Möhricke and Wenndorff received 21 and 22 months suspended sentences, while Regener received a prison sentence of 3 years and 4 months.

Regener appealed his conviction to the Supreme Court of Germany, which upheld the verdict in 2005. The group was disbanded, and was ordered to not regroup. Sales of their CDs were also outlawed. It was the first band to ever be deemed a criminal organization by Germany.

=== Aftermath ===
The broader far-right music scene in Germany was not affected by Landser's banning, and Regener continued to have fans. Regener later accused his band members of dishonoring themselves by cooperating with authorities. On October 21, 2006, approximately 750 neo-Nazis launched a "Freedom for Lunikoff" protest outside the jail where Regener was being held, demanding his release. The protest was sponsored by the far-right NPD party.

Regener was released from prison in 2008; he continues to produce right-wing music, though ceased overt promotion of neo-Nazism in order to avoid legal problems. The music of his later band, Die Lunikoff Verschwörung, had their lyrics reviewed by a lawyer before distribution. He sang on a tribute CD for the neo-Nazi Ralf Wohlleben in 2012.

In 2012, the Berlin Office for the Protection of the Constitution accidentally shredded many of its files on right-wing extremism, including the ones held on Landser that were slated to be archived, causing a political controversy in light of Landser's potential connections to the National Socialist Underground. Seven of the thirty four documents about Landser that were shredded were later reconstructed.

== Influence ==
By 2003, Landser albums had sold an estimated 100,000 copies. Scholar Kirsten Dyck considered them one of the most prominent white power bands, and "the most popular white-power band in Germany by far, and clearly one of the most popular groups in the international white-power music web overall." In 2002, Die Zeit identified them as the most popular neo-Nazi band in Germany. Even after its dissolution it retains a cult status with the far-right.

The music of the band was connected with a number of violent acts. This included several cases where perpetrators of anti-immigrant murders sang Landser songs before or during the commission of a crime.

== Discography ==
=== Albums ===
==== Studio albums ====
- Das Reich kommt wieder (1992)
- Republik der Strolche (1995)
- Deutsche Wut (a.k.a. Rock gegen Oben) (1997)
- Ran an den Feind (2000)

=== Compilations ===
- Best of Landser (2001)
- Tanzorchester Immervoll ...jetzt erst recht (2002)
- Endlösung - The early Years (2002)
- Rock gegen ZOG ....Hepp hepp ...Und noch einmal (2003)

== Personnel ==
- Michael Regener - vocals, guitar (1992-2003)
- André Möhricke - bass (1995-2003)
- Christian Wenndorff - drums (1997-2003)
