= Phantom of Heilbronn =

1993–2009 DNA contamination incidents in Western Europe

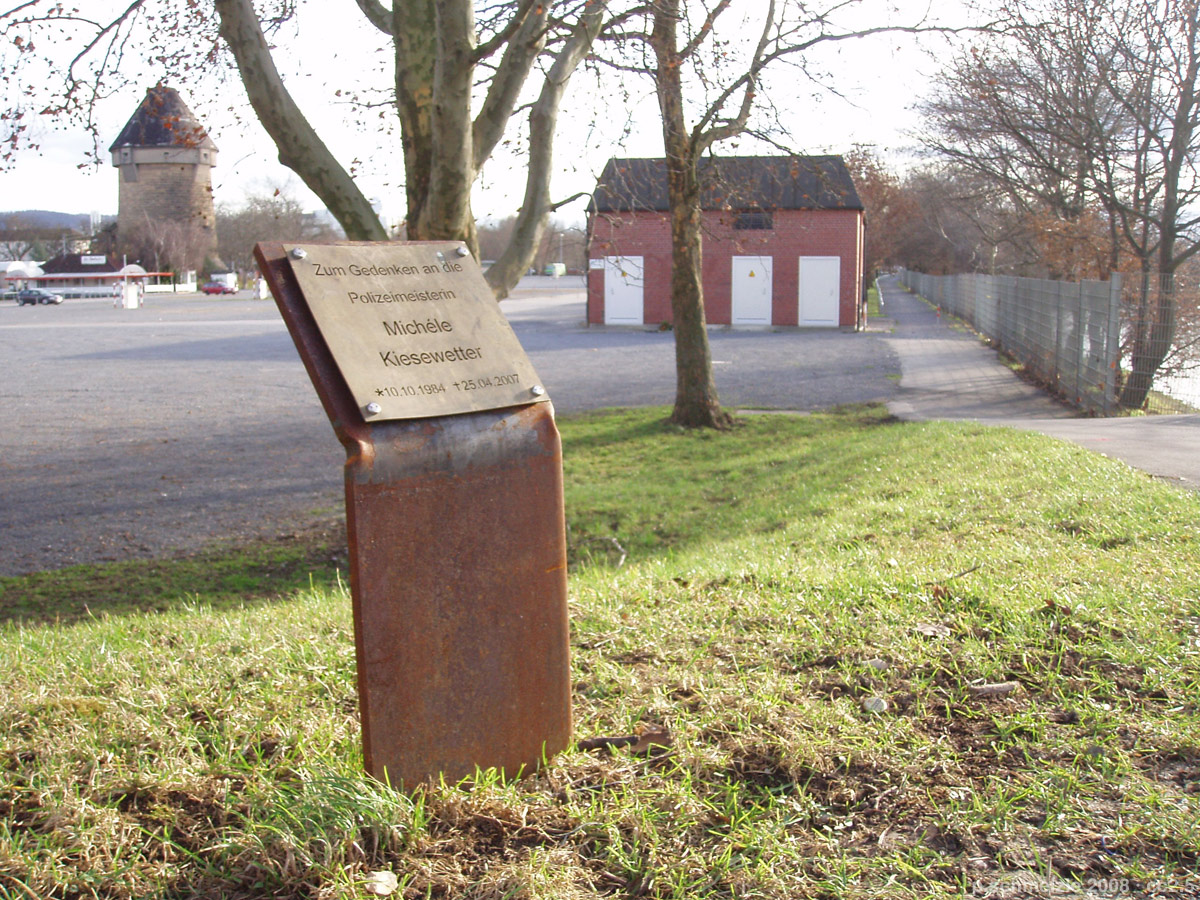
Commemorative marker near the site of Michèle Kiesewetter's murder

The Phantom of Heilbronn (German: Heilbronner Phantom), often alternatively referred to as the Woman Without a Face, was a presumed female serial killer whose existence was inferred from DNA evidence found at crime scenes across Austria, France and Germany from 1993 to 2009. The six murders among these included that of police officer Michèle Kiesewetter in Heilbronn, Germany, on 25 April 2007.

The only connection between the crimes, which included murders and burglaries, was DNA belonging to the same unidentified woman, which was recovered from 40 crime scenes. In March 2009, investigators concluded that the supposed serial killer did not exist, and the DNA belonged to a woman who worked at a factory that made the cotton swabs used for collecting DNA samples.

== Investigation ==
An analysis of the mitochondrial DNA from samples collected in Austria showed characteristics most often found among people in Eastern Europe and Russia. This was not discovered in the German investigations, as, at the time, DNA could only be used to determine few attributes, such as sex. Since at least 2008, some officers suspected that the evidence was misleading, and the DNA presence was due to contamination, which was confirmed in 2009.

The investigations were concentrated in a special task force named Parkplatz ("parking lot") at the Heilbronn police department. In January 2009, the reward for clues regarding the whereabouts of the Phantom was increased to €300,000.

The existence of the Phantom had been doubted earlier, but in March 2009, the case took a new turn when, while trying to identify a corpse, investigators found the Phantom's female DNA in fingerprints on a male asylum seeker's application. They subsequently came to the conclusion that there was no mysterious criminal and the laboratory results were due to contamination of the cotton swabs used for DNA probing. Although sterile, the swabs were not certified for human DNA collection.

The cotton swabs used by many state police departments were found to have been contaminated before shipping. It was found that the contaminated swabs all came from the same factory, which employed several Eastern European women who fit the type the DNA was assumed to match. The Bavarian police obtained their swabs from a different factory, which explains why no DNA of the supposed Phantom was ever found in Bavaria, although that state is close to many of the crime scenes where this DNA was found.

== Associated crimes ==
The Phantom's DNA was "found" in samples collected at the sites of, or on evidence related to, the following crimes:

- on a cup after the killing of Lieselotte Schlenger, a 62-year-old woman, on 25–26 May 1993 in Idar-Oberstein, Germany (the DNA was analysed in 2001)
- on a kitchen drawer after the killing of Joseph Walzenbach, a 61-year-old man, on 21 March 2001 in Freiburg, Germany
- on a syringe containing heroin, in the case of Juergen Bueller in October 2001 in a wooded area near Gerolstein, Germany
- on the leftovers of a cookie in a trailer that was forcefully opened on the night of 24 October 2001 in Budenheim, Germany
- on a toy pistol after the 2004 robbery of Vietnamese gemstone traders in Arbois, France
- on a projectile after a fight between two brothers on 6 May 2005 in Worms, Germany
- on a stone used for smashing a window, after a burglary on 3 October 2006 in Saarbrücken, Germany (DNA was discovered and analysed only 2008)
- after a March 2007 burglary at an optometrist’s store in Gallneukirchen, Upper Austria
- after 20 burglaries and thefts of cars and motorbikes between 2003 and 2007 in Hesse, Baden-Württemberg and Saarland, Germany; Tyrol and Upper Austria, Austria
- on a car used to transport the bodies of three Georgians killed on 30 January 2008 in Heppenheim, Germany (the DNA was analysed on 10 March 2008)
- after a burglary on the night of 22 March 2008 in a disused public swimming pool in Niederstetten, Germany
- after four cases of home invasion in Quierschied (twice), Tholey and Riol, Germany in March and April 2008
- after an apartment break-in in Oberstenfeld-Gronau during the night of 9 April 2008
- after the robbery of a woman on 9 May 2008 in a club house in Saarhölzbach
- in the car after the killing of an 45-year-old auxiliary nurse Diana Pavlenko who was found dead at the end of October 2008 near Weinsberg, Germany

== Consequence ==
As a consequence of this severe case of contamination with human DNA in a series of forensic investigations, the International Organization for Standardization (ISO) published the standard ISO 18385 in 2016 to define the requirements for producing consumables free of human DNA contamination designated for collecting biological evidence at crime scenes: "Minimizing the risk of human DNA contamination in products used to collect, store and analyse biological material for forensic purposes".

== See also ==
- Prawo Jazdy, a 'phantom criminal' in the Republic of Ireland
