= André Eminger =

German neo-Nazi

André Eminger (born 1979) is a German right-wing extremist. He supported the right-wing terrorist organization "Nationalsozialistischer Untergrund" (NSU) for more than 14 years. Eminger was sentenced to two-and-a-half years' imprisonment in the NSU trial on 11 July 2018 for the support of a terrorist group. He is referred to as the "most faithful supporter" of the right-wing terrorist group, showed no remorse and continued to be active in the right-wing movement.
