= Heinz Fromm =

German civil servant (born 1948)

Heinz Fromm (born 10 July 1948 in Frieda) is a German civil servant, who served as President of the Federal Office for the Protection of the Constitution from 2000 to 2012. He is a member of the Social Democratic Party of Germany.

== Biography ==
After obtaining his law degree, he joined the civil service of the state of Hesse in 1979. He became Director of the State Office for the Protection of the Constitution in Hesse in 1991, and served in this capacity until 1993. From 1993 to 1999, he was Secretary of State in the Hessian Ministry of the Interior, and subsequently from 1999 to 2000 Director of Kassel Prison.

He resigned on 2 July 2012, shortly after it was revealed that his office had destroyed files connected to the National Socialist Underground, a neo-Nazi terrorist group held responsible for a series of murders of immigrants. He was succeeded in his post by Hans-Georg Maaßen.
