= National Socialist Underground trial =

Trial against a right-wing terrorist organization in Germany

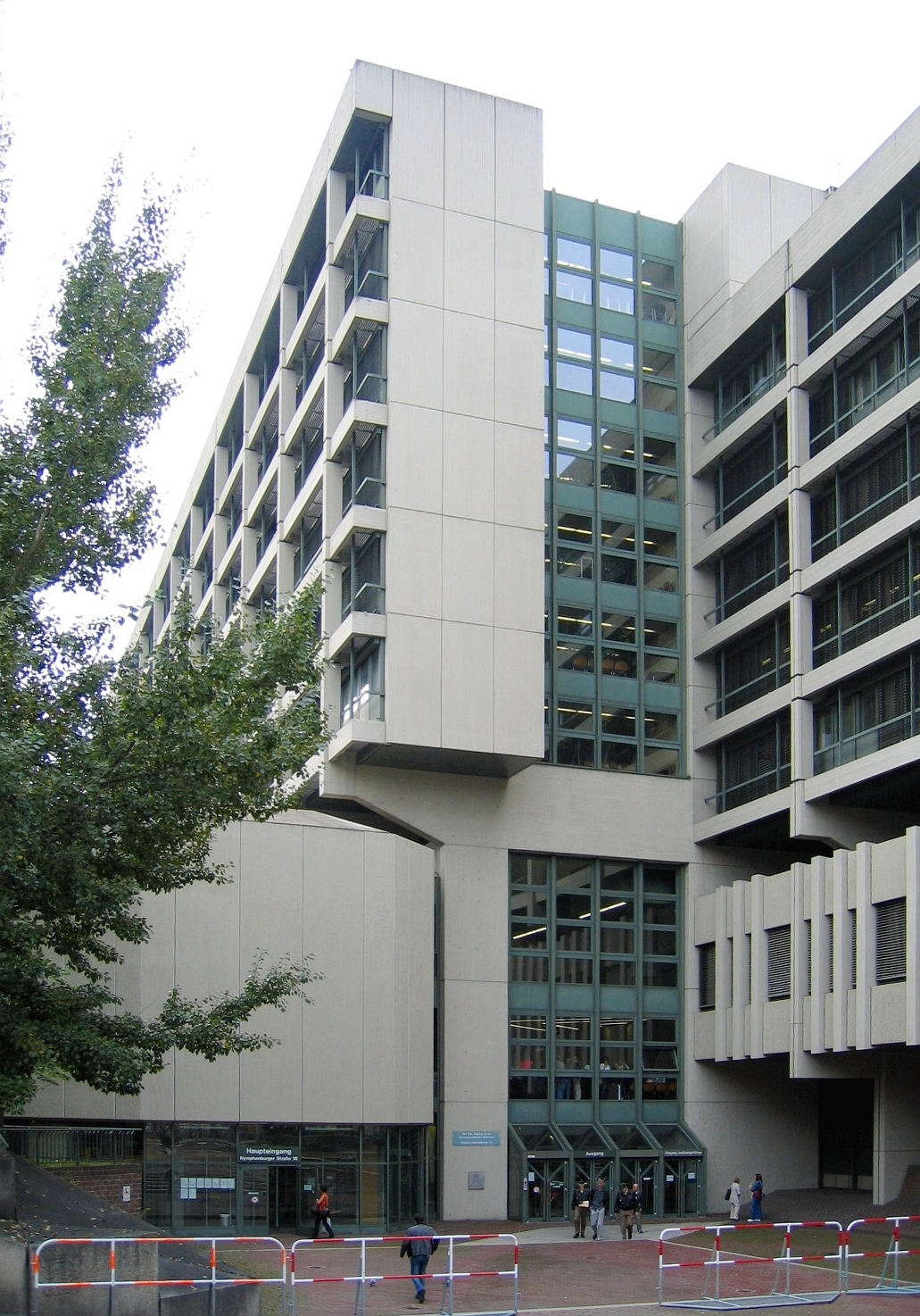
The place of the trial: the Higher Regional Court of Munich (Oberlandesgericht), Nymphenburger Strasse, Munich

The NSU trial or National Socialist Underground trial was a trial in Germany against several people in connection with the National Socialist Underground (NSU) – an extreme-right terrorist organization – and the NSU murders. It took place between 6 May 2013 and 11 July 2018 in Munich before the Munich Higher Regional Court. The trial was notable for being one of the largest, longest and most expensive in German history and made public claims of institutionalized racism within the German police force who for years ruled out Neo-Nazis as potential suspects in the killings and instead focused on suspects with Turkish backgrounds," going so far as to name their investigation "Bosporus."

Accused were Beate Zschäpe and four suspected helpers and supporters: André Eminger, Holger Gerlach, Carsten Schultze and former NPD official Ralf Wohlleben. Zschäpe had to answer charges of being a principal in ten murders and a serious arson and of being a member of a terrorist organization. Eminger was accused of knowing about the murders and aiding and abetting a terror organisation. Gerlach was accused of being an accessory by providing false documents for the so-called NSU trio. Schultze was accused of being an accessory by transporting the weapon used in nine of the murders to the trio. Wohlleben was accused, inter alia, of being an accessory by procuring this weapon. Other charges were also brought.

Beate Zschäpe was found guilty of murder on 11 July 2018 and was sentenced to life imprisonment, which her lawyer said she would immediately appeal. Wohlleben was sentenced to ten years in prison, Eminger received two and a half years and Gerlach and Schulze both received three-year sentences.

== Background ==
A series of murders that targeted small business owners, including doner kebab vendors and greengrocers with immigrant backgrounds took place in Germany between 2000 and 2007. These murders were referred to by the German authorities as the "Bosphorus serial murders" (Bosporus-Morde) and with the German yellow press using the derogatory term "Kebab Murders" (Dönermorde). Following the suicides of two Neo-Nazis, Beate Zschäpe turned herself in to the German police in Jena and was held in custody on suspicion of her involvement in the attacks. In 2012 she was formally charged.

Seda Başay-Yıldız, a lawyer of a victim family in the trial, faced massive threats. The threats were reportedly signed with "NSU 2.0", and included to kill her daughter. The first threatening fax was received by her in August 2018. During the trial five judges were presided by the leading judge Manfred Götzl and assisted by two associate judges. In the deliberation were included four state prosecutors and seventeen lawyers represented the defendants, while more than fifty lawyers represented the victims and co-plaintiffs. The trial counted 438 days of deliberations and 500 witnesses were heard. It raised a strong interest from the public society, some people arrived the night before the deliberation in order to have one of the hundred seats available in the room where the trial took place.

== Proceedings ==
On Saturday, 4 May 2013, objections were submitted to the judges, to be considered before the start of the trial. The objections centered on defence as well as plaintiff counsel being searched before entering the courtroom, while federal prosecutors and members of the court were not. On the first day of the trial, 6 May 2013, the presiding judge, Judge Götzl, deferred the decision on the applications, adjourning the trial until 14 May 2013. These motions of bias were rejected four days later.

Mahmut Tanal, a member of the Turkish parliament representing the Republican People's Party (CHP) who attended the first day of the proceedings, complained that the presence of a crucifix in the courtroom violated the secular principles of the rule of law and was a threat to all non-Christians.

On 4 June, the fifth day of the trial, Anja Sturm, the lawyer representing Zschäpe, sought a discontinuation of the trial in that the Attorney General's prosecutors, the Federal Criminal Police Office and other public figures and authorities had taken the accusations against her client as true before trial, thus breaching the constitution and making the trial untenable. The request was denied.

During the month of June 2013, the accused Carsten Schultze admitted being involved in the procurement of the firearm Česká 83 together with Ralf Wohlleben and Holger Gerlach admitted to organizing passports and driving licenses for Zschäpe, Böhnhardt, and Mundlos. Gerlach confessed to having deposited 10,000 DM for the trio in his hometown of Lauenau in Lower Saxony. Gerlach also confessed to have been involved in a before unknown bombing in Nürnberg by Mundlos and Böhnhardt. Schultze read a statement and demanded that Ralf Wohlleben, whose lawyers directed questions at him, but who himself remained in silence, also confesses. Schultze refused to answer the lawyers questions for the time Wohlleben didn't confess as well. But Wohlleben did not want to confess, and his lawyers demanded that he be released from detention, a demand which was denied.

=== 2015–2016 ===
In July 2015, Mathias Grasel joined Zschäpe's defence team. Dispute and distrust had arisen between Zschäpe and the lawyers representing her: Anja Sturm, Wolfgang Heer, and Wolfgang Stahl.

Zschäpe, the only surviving member of the NSU trio, made a statement on 9 December for the first time since the trial began, denying that she had been a member of the NSU. Although she admitted to have been involved with its members, she herself claims not to have been a member and to have disapproved of their actions. She apologized to the victims' families, saying that she felt morally guilty that she could not prevent the murders and bomb attacks carried out by Uwe Mundlos and Uwe Böhnhardt. Few took her apology seriously, with opinions that she was trying to deny her responsibility. Newspaper Bild ran a headline "Zschäpe's confession – nothing but excuses!"

Zschäpe had stated through her defence lawyer, Mathias Grasel, that she would only answer questions from the judges and lawyers for the four co-accused put in writing and that she would not answer questions from prosecutors. Judge Götzl read out 63 questions in court on 15 December. Prosecutors wanted to know about contacts Böhnhardt and Mundlos had with people who had not appeared in court and if Susann Eminger knew about the criminal activity.

In contrast to Beate Zschäpe who had her statement read by her defence lawyer, Ralf Wohlleben read his own statement out in court on 16 December. He stated that he took no part in the activities of the group and did not acquire the Česká weapon used in the killings for them. He said that since the mid-1990s he had had nothing against foreigners, although he was against politics promoting the influx of foreigners, and did not want Jena to have areas where there were only foreigners, as he believed was the case in Frankfurt am Main.

Zschäpe gave answers to the questions put by Judge Götzl on 21 January 2016. Judge Götzl asked a further 39 questions on 3 February.

=== 2017–2018 ===
In September 2017, prosecutors demanded a life sentence for Zschäpe. The closing arguments by the lawyers of the victims began over eight weeks after the closing arguments by the prosecutors on the 15 November 2017. Edith Lunnebach, who represented a victim of an attack in Cologne in 2001, criticized the prosecutors that they still see the NSU as only a cell of three people containing Zschäppe, Mundlos and Böhnhardt. Mehmet Daimagüler, who represented the families of two victims of the National Socialist Underground murders, focused on the insufficient investigations which excluded the wider network of the NSU. Zschäpe and three of the four men accused of assisting the crimes spoke their closing remarks on 3 July 2018.

== Verdict ==
=== Sentencing ===
On 11 July 2018, Beate Zschäpe was found guilty of ten counts of murder, membership in a terror organization and arson, and sentenced to life imprisonment. Wohlleben was convicted of aiding and abetting nine murders by procuring the pistol used and sentenced to ten years in prison. Both Eminger and Gerlach were convicted for aiding a terror organization. Eminger received two and a half years, Gerlach three years in prison. Far-right supporters in court applauded Eminger's lower-than-expected sentence. Schulze was convicted of aiding and abetting nine counts of murder but received only three years of juvenile detention as he was only 20 years old when it happened.

=== Reaction from victims' families ===
Several family members of the victims were dissatisfied with the trial which they said barely touched on the culpability of the German police services who took over 11 years to solve the crimes and spent years investigating the family members of victims while German media publicly ridiculed the killings by labeling them "the kebab murders." The chief prosecutor stated, following the trial, that he believes far more persons were involved in assisting the Neo-Nazi group than has been made public, that the victims' families would like further investigation into institutionalized racism within the German security services, and why German intelligence service personnel with links to the Neo-Nazi movement were not fully investigated by the German police.

== See also ==
- National Socialist Underground murders
- Birlikte
- Antisemitism
- Islamophobia
- World Union of National Socialists
