= Uwe Mundlos =

German neo-Nazi murderer (1973–2011)

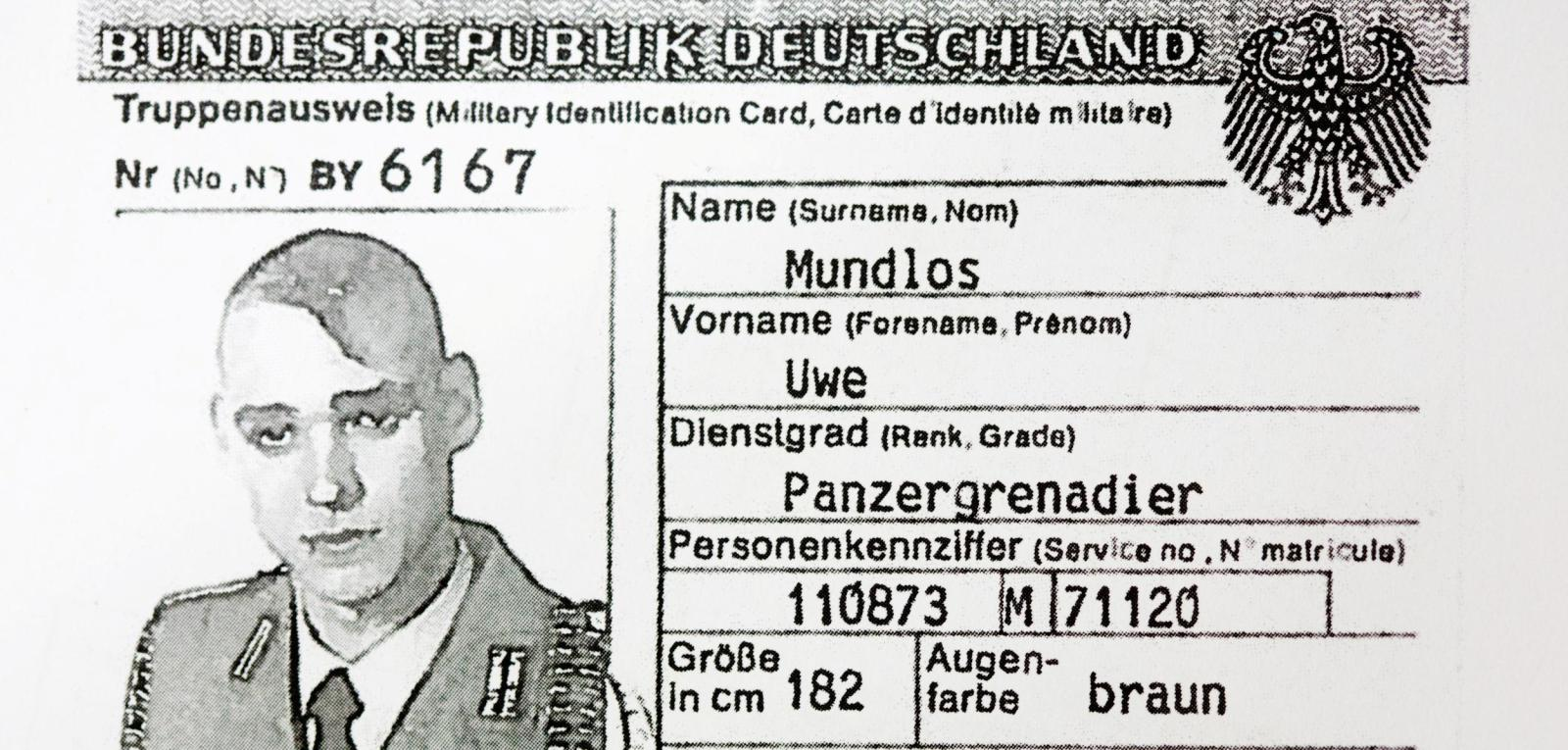
Uwe Mundlos as seen on a "Military identification card" as issued for him by the German army in 1994

Uwe Mundlos (11 August 1973 – 4 November 2011) was a German neo-Nazi, right-wing terrorist and serial killer. Together with Uwe Böhnhardt and Beate Zschäpe, he formed the nucleus of the terrorist group National Socialist Underground (NSU), which was responsible for 10 murders, 43 attempted murders, 3 explosive attacks, and 15 bank robberies in Germany between 1998 and 2011. He died, presumably by suicide, after a bank robbery led to his discovery by police.

== Early life and education ==
Mundlos was born and grew up in the East-German city of Jena. His brother was disabled. His mother was a saleswoman. His father, Siegfried Mundlos, was a mathematician at the University of Jena. Beginning in the early 1990s, he served as a Professor of Computer Science at the Ernst-Abbe-Hochschule Jena.

The Mundlos family home was a plattenbau on Max-Steenbeck Street in the Winzerla area of Jena. As a youth, Mundlos was a member of the Ernst Thälmann Pioneer Organisation and the Free German Youth. Until the summer of 1989 he attended the Magnus Poser Polytechnic School. Mundlos had good school grades, especially in science.

After Mundlos left school after tenth grade, he did a data-processing apprenticeship at Carl Zeiss AG. He later tried to do his "Abitur" exams at Illmenau College.

== Political development ==
From before the unification of Germany in 1990, Mundlos had become a right-wing skinhead. From 1988 he began to go to school with "short-cropped hair and jumper boots". After the unification of Germany, he became more radicalised. In September 1991 he opened the "Winzerclub", which became a focal point of the Jena Neo-nazi scene. It was there that Mundlos often met with the later NSU-members and supporters Uwe Böhnhardt, Beate Zschäpe, Ralf Wohlleben, Holger Gerlach and Andre Kapke.

Mundlos immersed himself in the neo-Nazi scene, attending skinhead concerts, and taking part in memorial marches for Nazi politician Rudolf Hess as well as a National Democratic Party of Germany demonstration. He also had friends who were members of the neo-Nazi group Blood & Honour. Mundlos was active in a prison support groups for incarcerated Nazis. From 1995 he was part of the core of the Anti-Antifa group in East Thuringia, along with his friends Uwe Böhnhardt and Beate Zschäpe.

In a right-wing extremist magazine, Mundlos published articles which he signed with the pseudonym "Uwe UngeZOGen" (which translates approximately to "Uwe Unruly" in English). The capitalisation of the letters "ZOG" is a reference the antisemitic conspiracy theory of the Zionist Occupied Government. It asserted that national governments (especially those of Western countries) are secretly directed and manipulated by Jews.

On 29 June 1995, the Amtsgericht Chemnitz sentenced Mundlos to 20 days in prison and a fine of 30 DM for "producing and keeping symbols of unconstitutional organisations". On 1 November 1996, Mundlos was banned from the Buchenwald concentration camp memorial because he had entered the grounds together with Uwe Böhnhardt wearing Sturmabteilung (SA) uniforms.

It is alleged that Mundlos had a network of nation-wide contacts with neo-Nazi groups as early as the mid-1990s.

== Military service ==
Between 5 April 1994 and 31 March 1995, Uwe Mundlos was a conscript in the German Bundeswehr. There he continued his right-wing extremist activities and attracted attention for singing right-wing extremist songs, amongst other things. His company commander requested a disciplinary arrest of seven days, because Mundlos "carried a personal business card with the head of Adolf Hitler and a picture of his deputy Rudolf Hess". Mundlos was taken into custody, and officers searched his flat, finding 15 cassettes of right-wing extremist music and leaflets from the NPD. However, in the opinion of the Truppendienstgerichts Süd in Kassel, this did not constitute "either a criminal offence or the elements of a service offence." Mundlos was subsequently released.

At the same time, the Military Counterintelligence Service listed Mundlos as a suspect. In March 1995 he was interrogated by the MCS and asked "whether he could imagine reporting dates for attacks on asylum seekers' homes of which he had become aware of to the police or the constitutional protection authorities". Mundlos answered in the negative. The MCS kept a file on Mundlos' contacts which was destroyed 15 years after the end of his military service.The matter came to light in September 2012 when MP Hans-Christian Ströbele asked the Bundestag's NSU investigation committee about it. It caused a scandal because the German Ministry of Defence had known about the existence of the documents for some time.

Mundlos was eventually promoted to the rank of Private, and to Private First Class in the reserves upon his retirement. He was trained with assault rifles, machine guns and the Walther P1. Mundlos had "performed well" as a gunner and assistant to his company squad leader, according to a certificate from the end of his military service.

== Bomb-making in Jena ==
Uwe Mundlos and his friends Böhnhardt and Zschäpe had been active in neo-Nazi activities since the mid-1990s. On 9 November 1996, the 58th anniversary of Kristallnacht, when multiple hundreds of Jews had been murdered, a police traffic stop found hand axes, batons, a throwing star, knives, a BB gun and a Nazi poster in the friends' car.

The following events are attributed to Mundlos and his friends:

- 6 October 1996 - a wooden box with a swastika painted on it, containing a dummy bomb, was found in the Ernst-Abbe-Sportfeld.
- At the end of 1996 and the start of 1997, several dummy bombs were addressed to the Jena police and the editorial office of the Thüringische Landeszeitung.
- 2 September 1997 - children found a suitcase in Jena's Theatre Square on which two swastikas had been painted. The suitcase contained a small amount of TNT. The bomb was not capable of detonation.
- 26 December 1997 - walkers at the memorial for Magnus Poser in Jena's North Cemetery discovered a suitcase with a swastika painted on it. It was later attributed to Mundlos and his friends.

On 26 January 1998 Thuringian authorities searched Mundlos's, Böhnhardt's and Zschäpe's apartments and their shared garage. In the garage the police found four live pipe bombs, 14 kg of TNT and Nazi propaganda. The plasticine found in the garage was identical to the plasticine used in the Theater Square bomb. On 28 January, an arrest warrant for Mundlos was issued. In 2003, the public prosecutor's office closed the investigation against Mundlos, citing the statute of limitations, although this had not yet been reached. The Jena District Court had ordered a search in 2000, which interrupted and restarted the statute of limitations.

== The National Socialist Underground ==
Mundlos, Böhnhardt and Zschäpe had gone underground on 26 January 1998, two days before the arrest warrant was issued. Until 2011, they relied on a network of old acquaintances from the neo-Nazi scene who supported them with flats, money, weapons and official documents. For example, Mundlos, nicknamed "Max", used the identity card of Max-Florian B in order to apply for a fraudulent passport. Despite an extensive manhunt by Thuringia police and the Federal Office for the Protection of the Constitution, the trio evaded capture.

After going underground, Mundlos, Böhnhardt and Zschäpe agreed to commit to a campaign of "assassinating 'enemies of the German people' such as residents of Turkish origin as well as representatives of the ruling order, such as police officers", in order to prepare for a change in the political system. The terror trio committed the "largest and bloodiest series of crimes since the attacks of the Red Army Faction".

Between 9 September 2000 and 6 April 2006, Mundlos and Böhnhardt murdered eight small-business owners of Turkish or Greek origin. The January 2001 explosive attack on a supermarket was also attributed to the pair. On 9 June 2004, they detonated a nail bomb in Keupstraße, Cologne, which injured 22 people. In April 2007, they shot and killed policewoman Michèle Kiesewetter in Heilbronn, as well as seriously injuring her colleague. Between 6 October 1999 and 4 November 2011, they committed 15 bank robberies around Germany.

In their crimes the pair used mountain bikes and rented campervans.

== Suicide in Eisenach ==
On 4 November 2011, Böhnhardt and Mundlos robbed a bank in the town of Eisenach, stealing over 70,000 euros. During their escape, they were spotted by the police. Police discovered a suspicious motorhome in which the bank robbers were hiding. After firing a shot at the police, the pair reportedly committed suicide. Mundlos supposedly killed Böhnhardt using a pump action shotgun with a close-range shot to the head. He is said to have set fire to their vehicle before fatally shooting himself in the mouth. The circumstances of Mundlos and Böhnhardt's deaths remained controversial for a long time.
