= Uwe Böhnhardt =

German neo-Nazi serial murderer and terrorist (1977–2011)

Uwe Böhnhardt (1 October 1977, in Jena – 4 November 2011, in Eisenach) was a German right-wing extremist who was one of three core members of National Socialist Underground (NSU), a neo-Nazi terror group that included scores of associates providing logistical support to the core trio. The other two core members were Uwe Mundlos and Beate Zschäpe. It is believed that Böhnhardt was killed in 2011 by Mundlos in an apparent murder-suicide.

Police initially identified traces of Böhnhardt's DNA on a fragment of fabric found near the site at which the missing girl Peggy Knobloch was found. Subsequently, German police retracted that claim when it was discovered that a DNA error had occurred, claiming the error was caused by a piece of contaminated equipment.

== See also ==
- National Socialist Underground murders
- National Socialist Underground trial
