= National Socialist Underground =

German neo-Nazi militant organisation, 2001–2010

- Nationalsozialistischer Untergrund
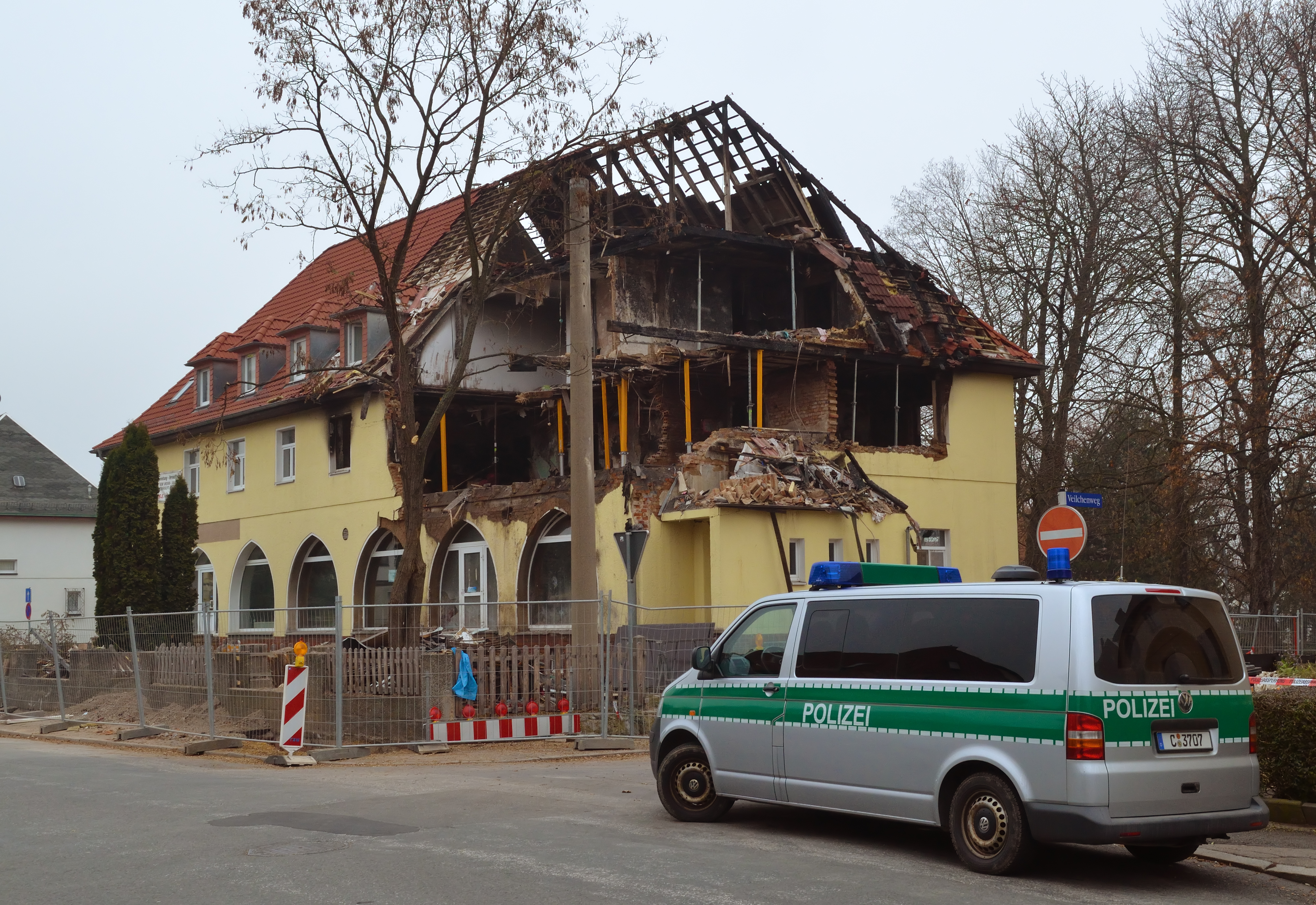
- The fire-damaged house used by the Nationalsozialistischer Untergrund in Zwickau
- Other name: NSU
- Leaders: Uwe Mundlos; Uwe Böhnhardt; Beate Zschäpe
- Dates active: 1998–2011
- Country: Germany
- Ideology: Neo-Nazism; Anti-Turkism
- Political position: Far-right
- Status: Defunct
- Size: Between 100 and 150

The National Socialist Underground (German: Nationalsozialistischer Untergrund, pronounced [natsi̯oˌnaːlzotsi̯alɪstɪʃɐ ˈʊntɐˌɡʁʊnt]), or NSU (German: [ɛnʔɛsˈʔuː]), was a German neo-Nazi militant organisation active between 1998 and 2011, and uncovered in November 2011. Regarded as a terror cell, the NSU is mostly associated with Uwe Mundlos, Uwe Böhnhardt and Beate Zschäpe, who lived together under false identities. Between 100 and 150 further associates were identified who supported the core trio in their decade-long underground life and provided them with money, false identities and weapons. Unlike other terror groups, the NSU had not claimed responsibility for their actions. The group's existence was discovered only after the deaths of Böhnhardt and Mundlos, and the subsequent arrest of Zschäpe.

So far, the following crimes have been attributed to the NSU: the National Socialist Underground murders, a series of murders of nine immigrants of Turkish, Greek and Kurdish descent between 9 September 2000 and 6 April 2006; the murder of a policewoman and attempted murder of her colleague; a 1999 bombing in Nuremberg; the 2001 and 2004 Cologne bombings; and a series of 14 bank robberies. The Attorney General of Germany called the NSU a "right-wing extremist group whose purpose was to kill foreigners, and citizens of foreign origin". The NSU attacks have been regarded as "the most violent by a guerrilla group in Germany since the end of the far-left Red Army Faction".

NSU's serial murders, 2001 and 2004 Cologne bombing and Murder of Michèle Kiesewetter

== Origins ==
Mundlos (born 1973), Zschäpe (born 1975) and Böhnhardt (born 1977) all came from the East German city of Jena. They became friends in the youth club "Winzerclub" in Jena-Winzerla, which Mundlos frequented since 1991. Here he met and became friends with Zschäpe, later also Böhnhardt. Other later supporters of the trio such as Ralf Wohlleben and André Kapke were also frequent guests of the youth club. Mundlos had been part of the East German skinhead scene since the late 1980s. While many in their peer group did not fully embrace the right-wing scene, the trio radicalized so much that in 1993 they, among others, were banned from the Winzerclub. To protest the ban they painted swastika symbols on the walls of the club. 1994/95 Mundlos was called up to the Bundeswehr, where he was disciplined multiple times for infractions.

== Murders ==
Between the years 2000 and 2007, the NSU perpetrated a series of racially motivated murders throughout Germany, leaving ten people dead and one wounded. Among their victims, most of them were ethnic Turks, though the victims also included one ethnic Greek and one ethnic German policewoman.

Most of their victims included Turkish small business owners. The NSU's modus operandi often involved executing victims in daylight at close range with a silenced CZ 83 handgun. As the NSU continued its attacks, authorities initially struggled to connect the murders to a single group, attributing them to organized crime, with security services blaming the Turkish mafia for the attacks.

== Investigations and public response ==
On 4 November 2011, after a bank robbery in Eisenach, Mundlos and Böhnhardt were found shot dead in a burning motorhome. Police said that the two set the vehicle on fire and killed themselves when their vehicle was found. The service pistol (HK P2000) of murdered police woman Michèle Kiesewetter was also discovered in the motorhome. Some hours later on the same day, the flat in Zwickau where the trio had lived under false identities, was set on fire, and an explosion occurred. Beate Zschäpe is suspected of having committed the arson. She later turned herself in on advice from her lawyer.

Police found a CZ 83 silenced weapon, which had been used throughout the NSU's serial murders, as well as a number of other guns in the remains of the house. Further, a DVD was found with images of three of the dead persons that had been taken immediately after the killings.

On 13 November 2011, Holger Gerlach, a possible fourth member of the NSU, was arrested and brought before a judge at Germany's Federal Court of Justice the following day, who ordered him to be placed in police custody. The German Attorney General's Office wanted Gerlach detained on suspicion of membership in a terrorist group. However the court's investigating judge only authorized Gerlach to be detained on suspicion of supporting a terrorist organisation. Gerlach was accused of renting a motorhome for the NSU, which Böhnhardt and Mundlos went on to use in the murder of police officer Michèle Kiesewetter in Heilbronn.

On 24 November 2011, agents from the German federal GSG 9 special police arrested André Eminger in Grabow. Eminger is suspected by the Attorney General of Germany to have produced a propaganda movie mocking the victims of the serial murders and claiming responsibility for the previously unknown NSU.

The discovery that all these mysterious and unsolved high-profile crimes were committed in cold blood by one obscure, previously unknown "Nationalsozialistischer Untergrund" terror group, that went unnoticed for 13 years, plunged Germany into a state of shock, even though right-wing terrorism has historical roots in Germany. After the underlying ideological pattern of the crimes became known by the public, Chancellor Angela Merkel stated on 14 November 2011 that she wanted to consider a ban of the National Democratic Party of Germany (NPD) to weaken the power of extremist right-wing groups.

It became known that an officer of the Hessian State Office for the Protection of the Constitution was inside the Internet café while its Turkish owner was killed by the NSU terrorists in 2006 in Kassel. This security agent (Andreas Temme) openly held right-wing views, and in his home village he was known by the nickname "Little Adolf". He has since been transferred to an administrative post (outside and unrelated to the agency).

On 23 February 2012, an official state ceremony in commemoration of the victims was broadcast live from Berlin; a nationwide moment of silence was observed and flags were flown at half-mast.

Various German politicians from all parties unanimously urged for a parliamentary enquiry committee, which has now begun digging deeply into the details of what is widely regarded as one of the biggest scandals concerning national security in modern German history. The affair is casting Germany's security apparatus into public disrepute for an obvious, complete failure and is causing sarcastic comments from the press. On 2 July 2012, the President of the Federal Office for the Protection of the Constitution, Heinz Fromm, resigned from his post shortly after it was revealed that on 12 November 2011, employees, most notably Axel Minrath (code name: Lothar Lingen), of his agency had destroyed files connected with the NSU case immediately after their role in the murders became public and the agency itself had received a formal request from the German Federal Criminal Police Office (BKA) to forward all information relevant to these crimes. Two more resignations of the presidents of the State Offices for the Protection of the Constitution in Thuringia and Saxony followed suit.

== Trial in Munich ==
The first trial against the NSU began on 6 May 2013. On trial were:

- Beate Zschäpe, charged with nine murders, an attack on police leading to a further murder, arson leading to two attempted murders, as well as membership in a terrorist organisation.
- André Eminger, charged with providing assistance in a nail bomb attack in Cologne, robbery and assistance of a terrorist organisation in two cases.
- Holger Gerlach, charged with providing assistance to NSU members.
- Carsten Schultze, charged with providing weapons to NSU members.
- Ralf Wohlleben, charged with providing weapons to NSU members.

On 14 May, Federal Prosecutor Herbert Diemer read out the indictment against Beate Zschäpe. Diemer accused her of involvement in 10 murders and of being a member of a group whose aim was to "commit murder and criminal acts dangerous to public safety" in order to intimidate the public and "wreak major damage to the state." The only purpose of the National Socialist Underground, said Diemer, "was to kill people."

Prosecutors deliberately and repeatedly stated that the scope of the trial was only to determine the level of complicity that Zschäpe and her fellow defendants had with the crimes the NSU stands accused of. It is the prosecution's opinion that Zschäpe, Mundlos, and Böhnhardt were the only members of the NSU despite strong evidence against the trio thesis.

One of the more controversial subjects to come to light during the NSU murder trial was the level of cooperation and support that neo-Nazi informants and organisations received from the Federal Office for Protection of the Constitution (BfV), Germany's domestic security agency. The BfV began cultivating informants from Germany's neo-Nazi groups in the early and mid-1990s to deal with the rise in anti-immigrant crime like the Rostock-Lichtenhagen riots of 1992. During the trial it became clear that BfV informants were aware or potentially aware of the homicides and other crimes attributed to the NSU and that this information was not shared with local police either accidentally or purposefully. All attempts made by the victims' legal team to examine this relationship have been buried by the prosecution team as irrelevant to the scope of the murder trial.

On 11 July 2018, Zschäpe was convicted of murder on ten counts and sentenced to life imprisonment. Her accomplices were convicted as follows:

- Wohlleben: Guilty – Convicted of aiding and abetting nine murders by procuring the pistol used. Sentenced to ten years in prison.
- Eminger: Guilty – Convicted of aiding a terror organisation. Sentenced to two and a half years in prison.
- Gerlach: Guilty – Also convicted of aiding a terror organisation. Sentenced to three years in prison.
- Schulze: Guilty – Convicted of aiding and abetting in nine counts of murder. Sentenced to three years of juvenile detention as he was only 20 years old at the time of the murders.

The release of Eminger on the day of the verdict received applause from the Nazis present in the court. Simultaneously, 10,000 people protested all over Germany against the limited solution of the NSU's crimes and the state's involvement, against the low verdicts for the terrorists and the police's racist investigations against the victims' families.

== See also ==
- NSU German History X, a German three-part TV mini-series about the rise and fall of the group
- Hepp-Kexel-Group
- Anders Behring Breivik and the 2011 mass terrorist attacks in Norway
- Atomwaffen Division, an American neo-Nazi terrorist group
- Boot Boys, a former Norwegian neo-Nazi group
- Combat Terrorist Organization, a Russian neo-Nazi terrorist group
- National Action, a banned British neo-Nazi group
- NS/WP Crew, a Russian neo-Nazi terrorist group
- Combat Organization of Russian Nationalists, a Russian neo-Nazi terrorist group
- Right-wing terrorism
- The Savior (paramilitary organization)
- White Aryan Resistance, a former militant neo-Nazi network active in Sweden
