= Beate Zschäpe =

German far-right extremist (born 1975)

- Zschäpe being tried for murder and terrorism
- Born: Beate Apel; 2 January 1975 (age 51); Jena, Bezirk Gera, East Germany
- Convictions: Murder (15 counts); Membership of a terrorist organisation; Arson
- Penalty: Life imprisonment

Beate Zschäpe (German: [beˈʔaːtə ˈtʃɛːpə]; née Apel; born 2 January 1975) is a German far-right terrorist and a member of the National Socialist Underground (NSU), a neo-Nazi terrorist organization. In July 2018, she was sentenced to life imprisonment for numerous crimes committed in connection with the NSU, including murder and arson.

== Early life and education ==
Beate Zschäpe's mother, Annerose Apel, was a citizen of East Germany who studied dentistry at UMF Bucharest. Zschäpe's father was a Romanian fellow dentistry student, Valer Boankic. Zschäpe never met him, and both denied being related until Boankic's death in 2000. Her mother had been unaware of her pregnancy until shortly before the birth and returned to Bucharest to continue her education, leaving Zschäpe to be taken care of by her grandmother, which became a recurring arrangement throughout her childhood. For the first five years of Zschäpe's life, she was largely raised by her grandparents and two stepfathers. After Zschäpe's mother returned to Germany, she worked in accounts at Zeiss.

Growing up in the austere Lobeda neighborhood of Jena, Zschäpe's relationship with her mother was at best uneasy. Her mother was first married to an on-off boyfriend, from whom she was separated during her relationship with Zschäpe's biological father, but the couple divorced after three years in 1978. The same year, Zschäpe's mother remarried, moved to Camburg and again divorced by 1979, keeping her second husband's surname for her daughter. During the first 15 years of her life, she moved six times within Jena and its surroundings.

A school report for her second school year (1982/1983) says, "Beate strives to achieve good learning results, but often lacks the necessary concentration and order, so she does not reach her full capability ... she is actively and joyfully involved in Pioneer Life".

In 1991, after she finished tenth grade (age 15–16), she left her mainstream school, the Johann Wolfgang von Goethe School, in the Winzerla district of Jena and began work under a job creation program as a painter's assistant. She then went on to do an apprenticeship as a gardener from 1992 to 1996, specializing in vegetable growing.

== Political development ==
Around the time of East Germany's dissolution and reunification, there had been an overall rise in extreme right-wing ideology in the youth of the then-still separated nations. Zschäpe had joined a leftist punk gang local to her neighbourhood in 1989, with whom she engaged in shoplifting, but she became increasingly involved with the political right around 1991. She met Uwe Mundlos, the son of a computer science professor at the Jena University of Applied Sciences who arrived in Winzerla with his family just before the fall of the Berlin Wall. She formed a relationship with him and entered Jena's neo-Nazi underground, coming into contact with the national and international neo-Nazi network. Uwe Böhnhardt, whose parents were a teacher and an engineer, became a close friend of theirs.

Zschäpe's mother lost her job after reunification in 1991, remaining unemployed until 1996. During this time, Zschäpe underwent an oophorectomy and became increasingly estranged from her mother and her mother's boyfriend. In January 1998, Zschäpe cut off contact with her family and for the next fourteen years, she lived with Mundlos and Böhnhardt, moving seven times between five apartments in Zwickau and Chemnitz. Zschäpe used twelve different aliases for doctor's visits and insurance.

A friend at the time later described Zschäpe as primitive, empty-headed, and with a vulgar demeanor and way of expression lacking any concern for manners. He described Mundlos as clever but lazy. Criminality (including stealing computers from his school) had left Böhnhardt without qualifications. A co-accused in the NSU trial describes Zschäpe as an achiever and not one to be subordinated. A letter Zschäpe wrote while in prison is 26 pages long, in legible, clear script without spelling errors. Sketches in it show clear ability at drawing.

== Imprisonment and accusation ==
On 8 November 2011, Zschäpe tried to turn herself in to the police by a phone call, when she introduced herself by saying, "Hello, this is Beate Zschäpe". She said that she was the person they had been looking for and that she was the reason why the whole city had been closed off. However, the policeman who had answered the call did not recognize her and said he did not know anything about such a case. A few hours later, Zschäpe herself arrived with her lawyer at the police station in Jena. Since 8 November 2011, she has been held in custody. On 11 November 2011, the Office of the Attorney General of Germany began investigating Zschäpe's then alleged membership of a terrorist unit.

On 8 November 2012, one year after the series of murders became known, the Office of the Attorney General pressed charges against Zschäpe and four alleged supporters. As a founding member of the NSU, she was accused of having taken part in the murders of eight fellow citizens of Turkish origin and one fellow citizen of Greek origin, in the murderous attack on two police officers in Heilbronn, as well as in the attempted murders by bomb attacks of the NSU in the historic inner city of Cologne and in Cologne-Mülheim.

According to the charges, the NSU was a group of three members with equal rights who committed their crimes after having coordinated their division of labour. In this process, Zschäpe is said to have had the indispensable task of giving the existence of such a terrorist unit the appearance of normality and legality by, among other things, maintaining an inconspicuous facade at their respective places of residence and by securing their joint flat as a safe haven and headquarters for their actions. In addition, she is said to have been "significantly responsible for the logistics of the group".

In a fingerprint analysis, evidence of Zschäpe's DNA is said to have been found on newspaper articles about the bomb attack in Cologne and the murder of Habil Kilic. In addition, Zschäpe is accused of having set fire to the group's apartment in Zwickau on 4 November 2011, hereby having rendered herself liable for prosecution for the attempted murder of a neighbour and two craftsmen as well as for particularly serious arson.

The department of public prosecution in Zwickau also investigated her because child pornography had been found on her computer. However, this investigation was said to have been closed, since the penalty for this would be of "no significant weight" in comparison to the penalty for the actions of which she had already been accused.

In February 2013, Annerose Zschäpe told Focus that she thought her daughter was being prejudged and that her position was not being considered objectively. She said that part of a statement she had made to police was misrepresented in the press or taken out of context. She said there was a lot she would like to see put straight, but she did not want to say more before the trial commenced.

== NSU trial ==
The trial started on 6 May 2013 before a division of the Higher Regional Court in Munich dealing with state security cases. According to the code of criminal procedure, the trial was required to take place in one of the federal states in which one of the crime scenes of the NSU is located. Five of the nine murders of immigrants took place in Bavaria. Zschäpe was defended by Wolfgang Heer (Cologne), Wolfgang Stahl (Koblenz) and Anja Sturm (Berlin).

Zschäpe had been imprisoned in the prison in Cologne-Ossendorf, but has been moved to a prison in Munich. She refused examination by the court-designated psychologist Henning Sass. She was, however, evaluated by psychiatrist Joachim Bauer, who was commissioned by her defence team; Bauer diagnosed her with dependent personality disorder, which defense-attorneys argued reduced her criminal liability.

Her defence counsel argued that Zschäpe could be accused of complicity in the NSU murders. In January 2013, the Higher Regional Court in Munich proposed to ease the conditions of Zschäpe's imprisonment because the NSU did not exist anymore and, therefore, support of the group by the imprisoned woman was no longer possible.

In December 2015, Zschäpe, the only surviving member, broke her silence after two and a half years and made a statement, denying that she had been a member of the NSU. Although she was involved with some of their members, she herself was not a member and disapproved of their actions. She apologized to the victims' families, saying that she felt morally guilty that she could not prevent the murders and bomb attacks carried out by Uwe Mundlos and Uwe Böhnhardt. Few took her apology seriously or accepted it. Bild ran a headline stating that: "Zschäpe's confession – nothing but excuses!" In September 2017, the prosecutors demanded that life imprisonment is to be imposed on Zschäpe as punishment for her crimes.

On 11 July 2018, Zschäpe was found guilty of ten counts of murder, membership in a terror organization, and arson, and sentenced to life imprisonment without ordinary parole. She appealed her sentence, and on 19 August 2021, the Federal Court of Justice upheld Beate's life sentence and rejected her appeal. In addition, the Court found that due to the gravity of her offences, she would not be eligible for parole after 15 years.

On 20 September 2021, Zschäpe's lawyers filed a complaint to the Federal Constitutional Court. They hoped to obtain, inter alia, an oral hearing before the Federal Court of Justice that had been denied for the appeal there while the written procedure had precluded their being able to express themselves regarding the court's apparent divergence from established law by taking "an interest in the success of the crime" as sufficient for complicity. Beforehand, on 26 August 2021, her lawyers had presented the complaint to the Federal Court of Justice. It is necessary that all attempts at resolution be made in the lower courts before a case can go to the Federal Constitutional Court. On 22 September 2021, the Federal Court of Justice rejected the complaint, publishing the decision on 4 November 2021. The Federal Court of Justice stated that the complaint rested on a false interpretation of its appeal decision of 19 August 2021 that, it said, had laid clear both mens rea and actus reus.
