= State Office for the Protection of the Constitution =

State-level security agency in Germany

The State Office for the Protection of the Constitution (German: Landesbehörde für Verfassungsschutz; LfV) is a state-level security agency in Germany.

In seven federal states of Germany, it is a semi-independent agency called Landesamt für Verfassungsschutz and reports to the state's interior ministry. In the nine remaining federal states, it is organized as a division within the state's interior ministry.

The following states, mostly Western German, have a detached Landesamt für Verfassungsschutz:

- Landesamt für Verfassungsschutz Baden-Württemberg
- Bayerisches Landesamt für Verfassungsschutz
- Landesamt für Verfassungsschutz Bremen
- Landesamt für Verfassungsschutz der Freien und Hansestadt Hamburg
- Landesamt für Verfassungsschutz Hessen
- Landesamt für Verfassungsschutz Saarland
- Landesamt für Verfassungsschutz Sachsen

The following nine states, both in the East and West part, have a division within each state Interior Ministry handling constitutional protection:

- Verfassungsschutz Berlin
- Verfassungsschutz Brandenburg
- Verfassungsschutz Mecklenburg-Vorpommern
- Verfassungsschutz Niedersachsen
- Verfassungsschutz Nordrhein-Westfalen
- Verfassungsschutz Rheinland-Pfalz
- Verfassungsschutz Sachsen-Anhalt
- Verfassungsschutz Schleswig-Holstein
- Amt für Verfassungsschutz Thüringen

== See also ==
- List of intelligence agencies of Germany
