= Antifaschistisches Infoblatt =

Antifascist magazine in Germany

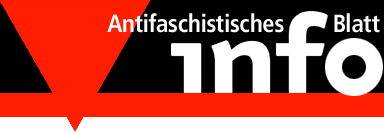
- Categories: Politics, Anti-fascism
- Frequency: Quarterly
- Publisher: Self-published
- Founded: 1987
- First issue: Spring 1987
- Company: Self-publishing
- Country: Germany
- Based in: Berlin
- Language: German
- Website: www.antifainfoblatt.de
- ISSN: 1862-7838

Antifaschistisches Infoblatt (AIB) is an anti-fascist publication in Berlin, Germany. It was founded in 1987 and the first issue appeared in Spring. The magazine is published four times a year. It has provided information since 1987 on völkisch-nationalist ideologies, as well as on right-wing conditions and the state of the left. It covers actors, organisations and infrastructure within the right-wing spectrum, along with current developments from an antifascist perspective. The publication cooperates with similar publications in other countries, including Expo and Searchlight. It has been a member of Antifa-Net since 2003.

== Self-conception ==
The magazine defines itself as a "counterpublic" and "antifascist resistance". The editorial team assumes that—such as during the nationwide pogrom wave against refugees in the first half of the 1990s—political backgrounds are omitted in the Mainstream media, authoritarian, nationalist and racist sentiments in society are denied, and right-wing activities are downplayed. The magazine aims to help close this gap. At the same time, it positions itself as a mediator and platform for information, concepts, campaigns and debates from antifascist groups and initiatives.

It includes reports on German and European history, particularly the era of Nazism, as well as national and international connections and ideological commonalities among national conservatives, right-wing populists and neo-Nazis, along with ongoing analyses of the entire spectrum. In addition to current manifestations, it also addresses its intellectual history, its sources and references. Extensive background articles aim to provide thoroughly researched information that "would not be offered in this level of detail" in commercially oriented media.

The editorial collective is divided into various departments: "Braunzone", "History", "Society", "Racism", "Repression", "Discussion".

Its authors include, among others:

- Markus End
- Sebastian Friedrich
- Frances Henry
- Stefan Jacoby
- Andreas Kemper
- Franz Josef Krafeld
- Dirk Laabs
- Rudolf Leiprecht
- Sebastian Lipp
- Michael Plöse of Pro Asyl
- Harry Waibel
- Volker Weiß

The magazine is published quarterly and has a page count of around 60 pages. It is produced by a volunteer editorial collective through self-publishing.

== Cooperations ==
As a nationwide publication, the AIB collaborates with various like-minded media projects and archives, as well as journalists, historians and activists in Germany. Since 1988, it has worked with antifascist initiatives in Europe and North America and has been a member of the international network Antifa-Net since 2003, connecting it to antifascist initiatives in Europe, Asia and the US.

The magazine cooperates with the internet platform Linksnet. Its information offerings are received across a spectrum of opinions that includes representatives of decidedly left-wing positions, journalistic researchers and authors, the trade union ver.di, the student and early-career scholars' association "Engagierte Wissenschaft" (EnWi e. V.) at the University of Leipzig, and established academic specialists or local citizens' initiatives, such as the alliance "Leipzig – Stadt für alle" (Leipzig – A City for All). A study by the Bertelsmann Stiftung views the AIB, alongside the Antifaschistische Nachrichten, as one of two noteworthy German publications within an international network of antifascist and anti-racist NGOs.

It is joint publisher, together with Searchlight (UK) and Enough is enough, of two books addressing specific aspects of right-wing populism and the radical right: Rechtspopulismus kann tödlich sein! and White Noise: Rechts-Rock, Skinhead-Musik, Blood & Honour. The second publication received positive reception far beyond the AIB's core readership, including in the Neue Zürcher Zeitung.

== Reception ==
The AIB's expertise is used by many political scientists in the fields of extremism of the centre, right-wing populism and neo-Nazism for their studies. Its research findings also appear in so-called "quality journalism". It is perceived as an "alternative media" in relation to mainstream.

The political scientist Armin Pfahl-Traughber describes the AIB as a "relevant publication organ" of the far-left within the field of "antifascism".

In 2002, the AIB was mentioned in a brochure by the Baden-Württemberg Office for the Protection of the Constitution on "Antifascism as an action field of left-wing extremists", classified under "Forms of left-wing extremist antifascist work – legal antifascism".

== See also ==
- Red triangle (badge)
