= Alcohol laws in Germany =

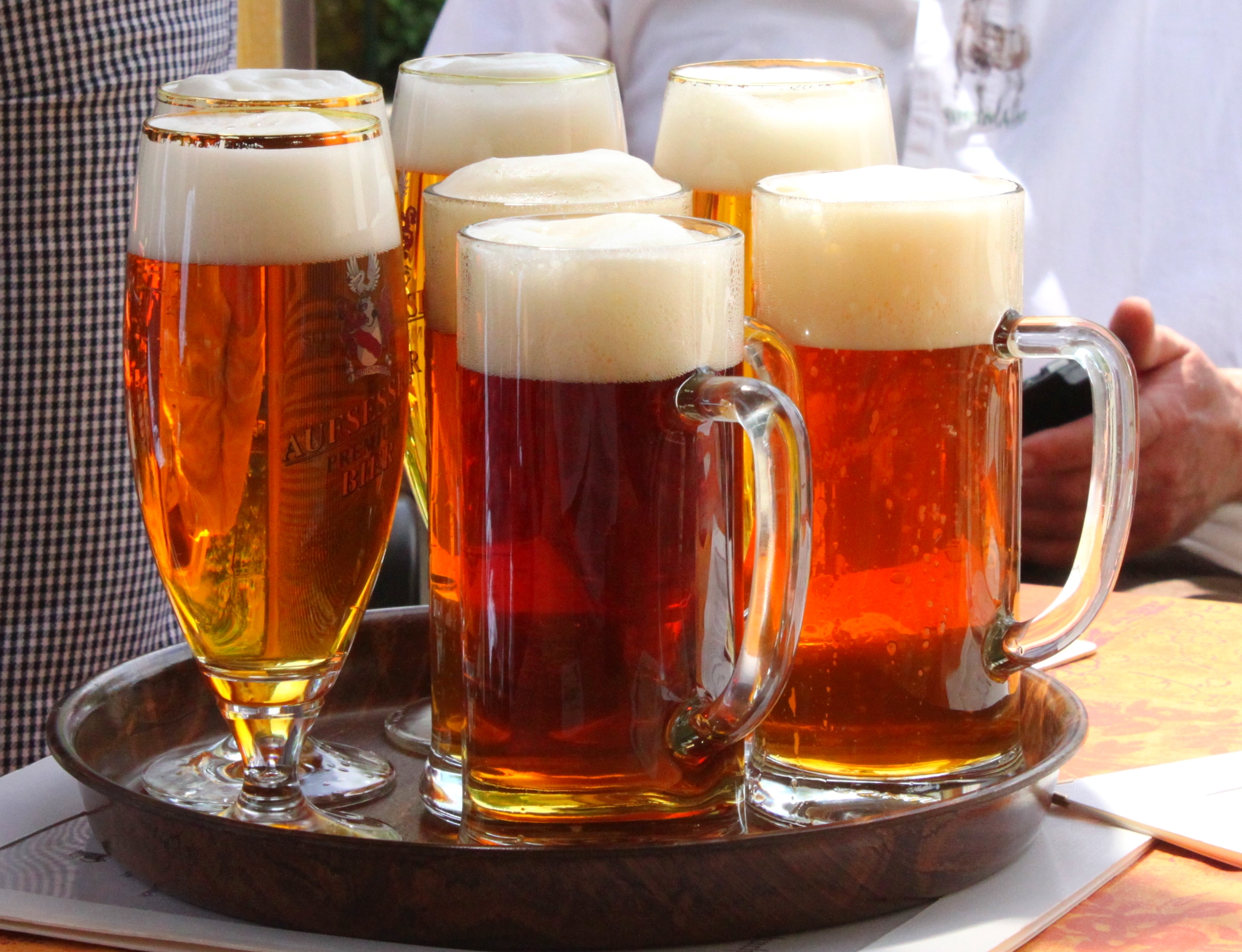
Beer is an important part of German culture.

The German laws regulating alcohol use and sale are mostly focused on youth protection. In contrast to many other countries, legislation is relatively lenient and not designed to keep young people away from alcohol, but rather intended to teach them an appropriate approach to alcohol consumption, which is reflected by one of the lowest drinking ages in the world.

The tax rates for alcoholic beverages in Germany are below average compared to the rest of Europe, and there are very few regulations governing availability. Drinking in public is generally legal and considered socially normal. Although the government has planned stricter regulations several times, the alcohol industry is politically influential and has prevented their implementation.

In 2006, approximately 1.7 million people in Germany were dependent on alcohol and needed treatment, and 2.7 million consumed alcohol in a harmful way. In 2016, Germany had the fifth highest per capita alcohol consumption worldwide. The rate of teenagers drinking alcohol in Germany is one of the highest in both Europe and the world. Due to the low taxation on alcohol, low drinking age and lax regulations regarding availability, as well as a supposed social trivialization of the risks and harmfulness of alcohol in the country, Germany has been referred to as a paradise for drinkers.

== Drinking age ==
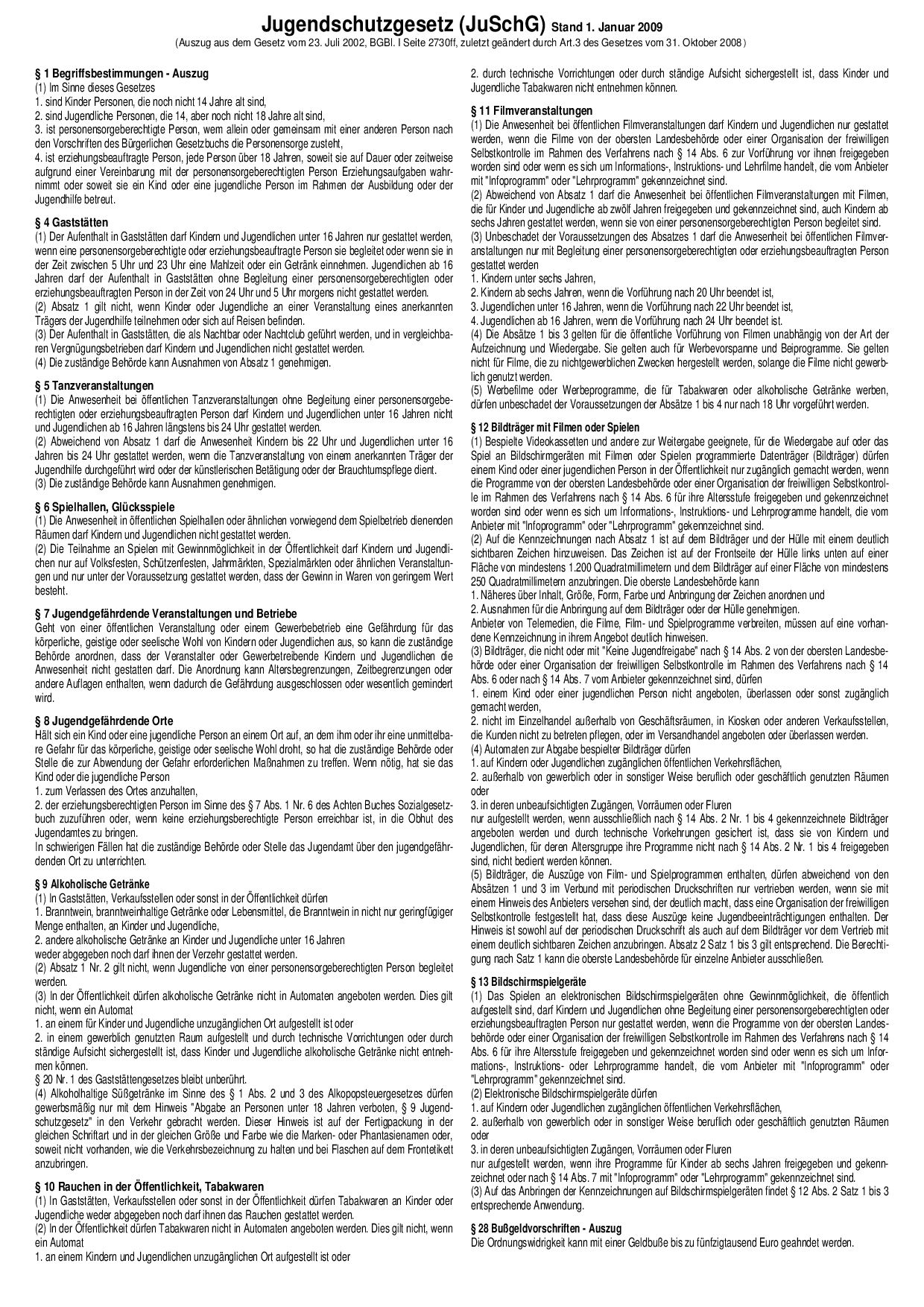
German Jugendschutzgesetz (Youth Protection Law): The law has to be placed at every public event and establishments selling or serving alcoholic beverages.

In Germany, underage drinking in private is not regulated by a specific legal restriction. However, protection from physical and mental harm is part of parents' general obligation to care for a child. Regarding alcohol purchase and alcohol consumption in public places (such as pubs and restaurants), Germany has three drinking ages regulated by § 9 Jugendschutzgesetz (Protection of Young Persons Act):

§ 9 Alcoholic drinks
(1) In licensed premises, at points of sale or elsewhere in public places

1. Beer, wine, wine-like beverages or sparkling wine or mixtures of beer, wine, wine-like beverages or sparkling wine and soft drinks, must not be sold to Children and Adolescents below the age of 16 years,
2. other alcoholic drinks or food items that contain other alcoholic drinks in more than insignificant quantities must not be sold to Children and Adolescents,

nor must their consumption by said persons be tolerated.

(2) Sub-Clause 1, No. 1 shall not apply to Adolescents accompanied by a Custodial Person.

— Protection of Young Persons Act, § 9 Alcoholic drinks

This results in three different drinking ages depending on the type of alcoholic beverage and circumstances:

- At 14 – Minors are allowed to consume and possess undistilled alcoholic beverages, such as beer and wine in public places, bars or restaurants, as long as they are in the company and have the permission of a Custodial Person. (§ 9 JuSchG (2) and § 1 JuSchG (1) 2). This regulation is colloquially known as "begleitetes Trinken" ("accompanied drinking") and is considered increasingly controversial in recent years, with two SPD politicians having called for its abolition.
- At 16 – Minors are allowed to consume and possess undistilled alcoholic beverages, such as beer and wine in public places, bars or restaurants without their parents or a Custodian. (§ 9 JuSchG (1) 2).
- At 18 – Having become adults, people are allowed access to distilled spirits, beverages containing distilled spirits, and food products containing non-negligible amounts of distilled spirits. (§ 9 JuSchG (1) 1).

Those limits do not apply to married adolescents. (§ 1 JuSchG (5)).

=== Debate on raising the drinking age ===
Because of moral panic involving excessive alcohol use among minors (a 16-year-old boy died after having consumed 45 shots of tequila in a bar in early 2007), some people demanded that the drinking age be raised. Most politicians, however, spoke against that notion, pointing out instead that such use was already forbidden according to current laws, which simply needed to be enforced. In Germany, alcohol consumption is traditional and very much publicly accepted compared to most other countries.

A study by the RWI Essen found a correlation between reaching the age of 16 and then starting to consume significantly more alcohol and committing more crimes.

The Deutsche Hauptstelle für Suchtfragen (German Centre for Addiction Issues) recommends raising the drinking age for all alcoholic beverages in Germany to 18 years.

The German Cancer Research Center calls for raising the drinking age in Germany to a uniform 18 years for all types of alcoholic beverages.

In a representative survey conducted on YouGov in 2015, a majority of the 1252 participants were in favor of raising the minimum age for light alcoholic beverages in Germany to 18.

In a survey conducted by the MDR, 85% of the approximately 19,000 participants were in favor of a general ban on the sale of alcohol to under-18-year-olds in Germany.

Burkhard Blienert, Federal Government Commissioner for Addiction and Drug Issues since 2022, spoke on the subject of the drinking age in Germany and is in favor of raising it to 18 for all types of alcoholic beverages and abolishing the regulation of "begleitetes Trinken" ("accompanied drinking") from 14 years of age.

=== Enforcement ===
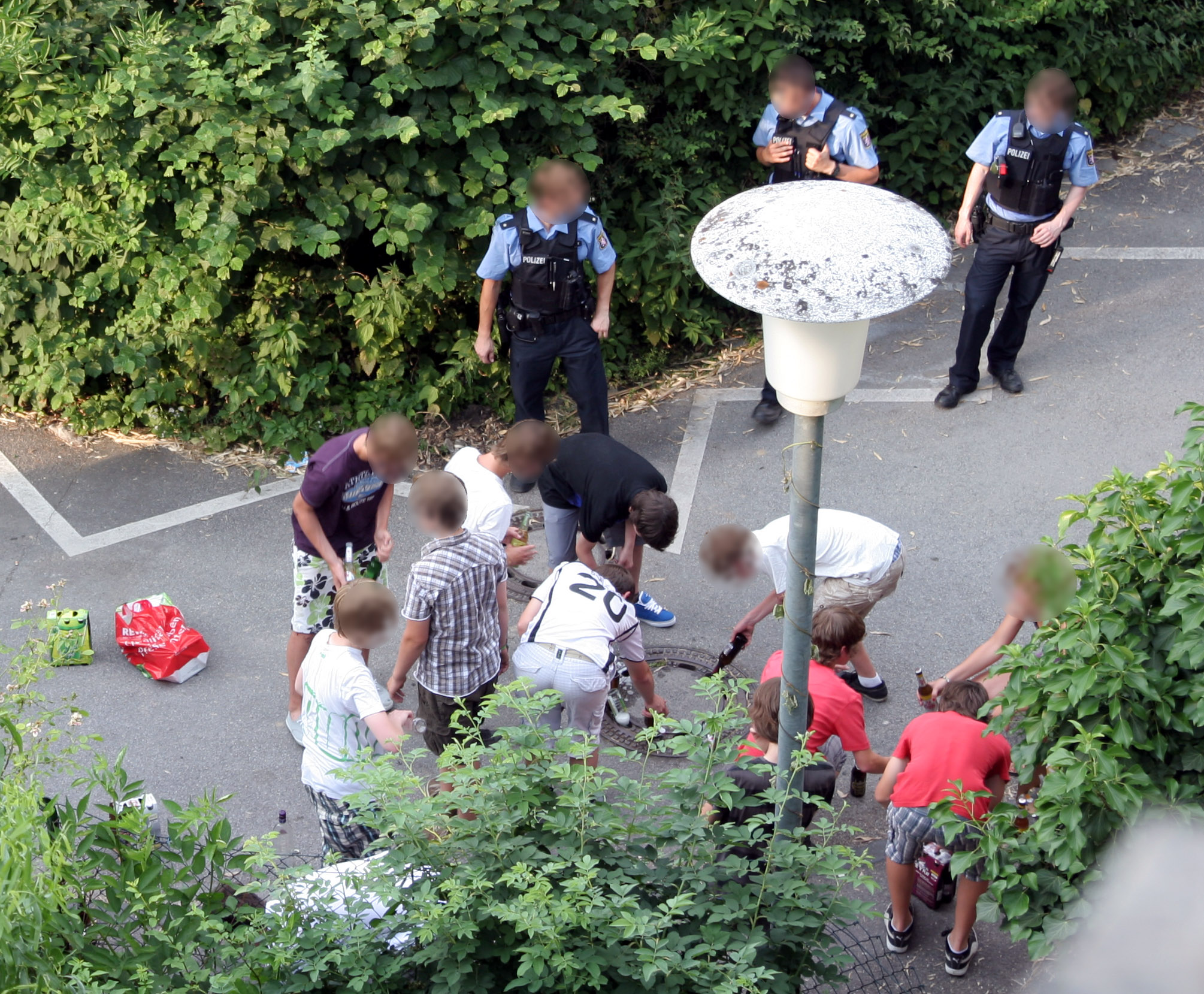
Police operation in Bensheim (Hesse). Several young people have to dispose of illegally obtained alcoholic beverages in the sewers, because they have not reached the required age limit.

In 2008, the federal state of Lower Saxony started a series of trap purchases, conducted by specially trained police cadets, aged 16 or 17, who pose as customers. In 77% of all tests alcohol was sold illegally in shops, filling stations and kiosks. In 2009, about 3000 trap purchases were carried out in Lower Saxony, in 1327 cases (44%) alcohol was sold without age verification to underage persons. Hundreds of summary proceedings led to administrative fines ranging from 500 to 3000 euros. The standard rate for the illegal sale of one bottle of spirits is 1500 euros. Thus, alcohol trap purchases bring a return of around €2 million annually. Other German states, especially Schleswig-Holstein, are considering implementing the Lower Saxony model, but states like Berlin, Brandenburg, Saxony-Anhalt, Thuringia and Baden-Württemberg object to it.

Violation of restraints will involve prosecution for vendors who sell alcohol to underage persons and also for bystanders who do not intervene in underage drinking. Although restrictions are nationwide and well-known, some salespersons violate the law at times. Minors themselves can never be prosecuted for alcohol consumption under age. Supermarkets and stores generally check minors for their identity card. The law is less thoroughly enforced in many bars and restaurants, but this can vary by location.

=== Fines for violation ===
Under the Protection of Young Persons Act selling, furnishing and supplying alcoholic beverages in licensed premises, at points of sales or elsewhere in public by a person over the age of 18 years to a person under the required age limits is considered a misdemeanor. Violation can result in fines up to €50,000.

The "Bußgeldkatalog" of each state sets the possible fines for each violation of the act and varies slightly by state. In the state of Baden-Württemberg the Bußgeldkatalog for violation against the "Protection of Young Persons Act" provides following fines:

Misdemeanor	Law	Possible fine (retailer & business operator)	Standard fine (retailer & business operator)	Possible fine (other)	Standard fine (other)
Selling or serving spirits or food products, containing more than insignificant quantities of spirits, to a child under 14 years of age	§ 9 Sec. 1 JuSchG	€1,000 - €4,000	€3,000	€300 - €1,000	€500
Selling or serving spirits or food products, containing more than insignificant quantities of spirits, to a young person over the age of 14 but under the age of 18 years	§ 9 Sec. 1 JuSchG	€700 - €3,500	€2,000	€100 - €500	€300
Selling or serving beer, wine, wine-like beverages or sparkling wine or mixtures of beer, wine, wine-like beverages or sparkling wine and soft drinks, to a child under 14 years of age	§ 9 Sec. 1 JuSchG	€700 - €3,500	€2,500	€100 - €500	€300
Selling or serving beer, wine, wine-like beverages or sparkling wine or mixtures of beer, wine, wine-like beverages or sparkling wine and soft drinks, to an unaccompanied young person over 14 years but under 16 years of age	§ 9 Sec. 1 JuSchG	€500 - €3,000	€2,000	€100 - €500	€300

== Other legislation ==
=== Alcohol consumption in public ===
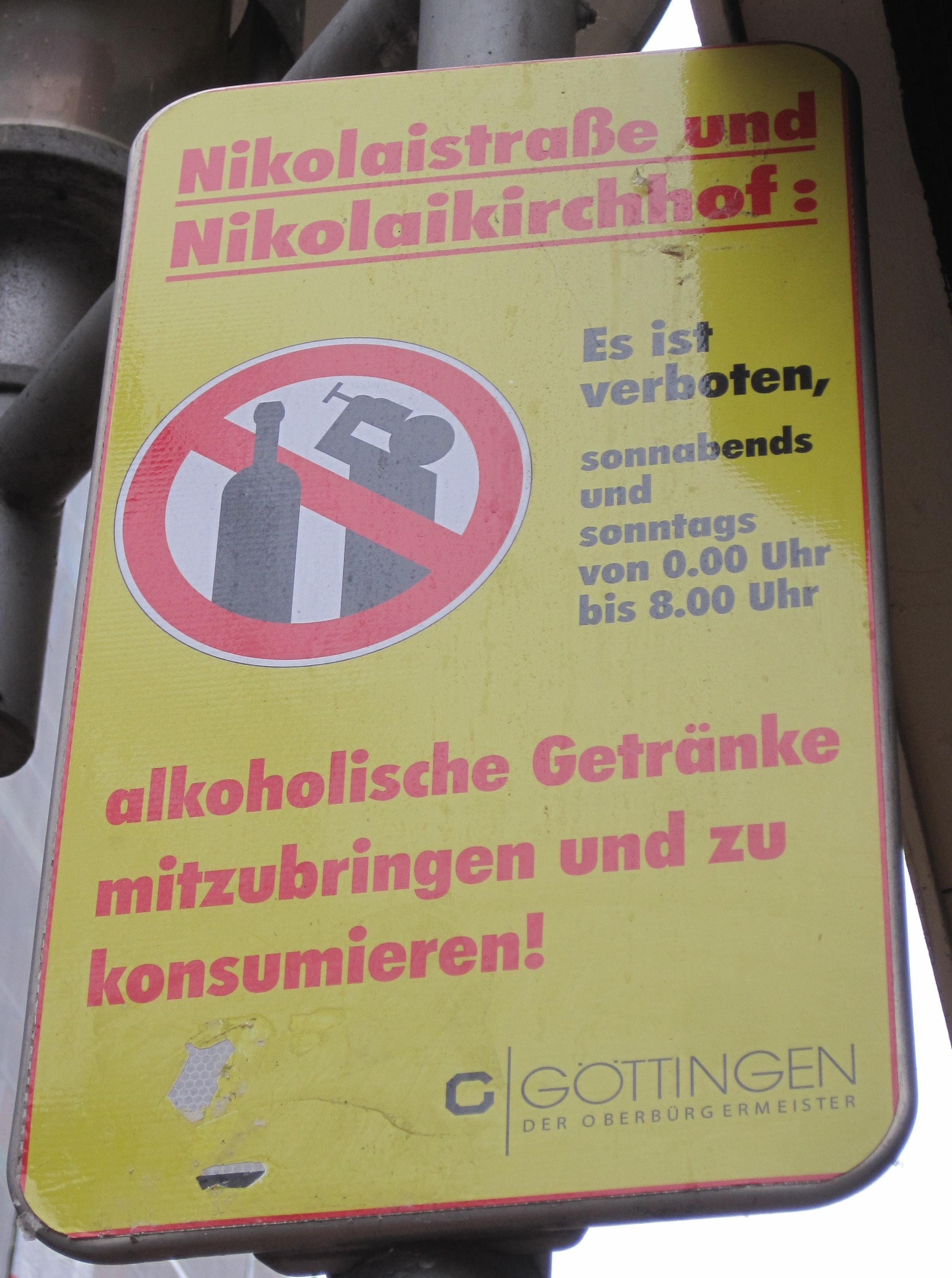
Alcohol ban in Göttingen's Nikolaistraße

Public parties are prohibited nationally on Good Friday, and regionally on other holidays such as All Saints' Day. Buying alcohol remains possible at these times. The government maintains the right to restrict or ban the sale of alcohol for a certain time to maintain public order (§ 19 GastG).

Beyond this, Germany has very few restrictions on alcohol consumption in public. Exceptions are sometimes made in the context of football matches involving rival teams, where police executives may ban the sale of alcoholic drinks inside stadiums and deny entrance to drunk people. In 2009, the private railway company Metronom, which operates in parts of Northern Germany, introduced a much-discussed complete ban on alcohol onboard their trains. Some cities have banned alcohol consumption in certain areas and at certain times, such as Göttingen in Nikolaistraße on Saturdays and Sundays between 00:00 and 08:00, or in Hannover Hauptbahnhof (outside the existing bars and restaurants) until 2011 when the ban was repealed.

Until 2009, it was acceptable for employees in many fields of work (especially builders, gardeners and manual labourers) to consume medium quantities of alcohol during work hours. However, occupational safety legislation has since tightened down and has induced a significant decrease of alcohol consumption during working hours.

=== Drinking and driving ===
Germany has laws regarding operation of motor vehicles under the influence of alcohol and other psychoactive substances. There are a series of different rules and penalties tied to various blood alcohol levels.

- 0.0‰ for those under the age of 21 or with less than two years' experience, professional drivers, bus drivers, lorry drivers, and drivers transporting passengers commercially;
- 0.3‰ in conjunction with an accident or traffic offense;
- 0.5‰ otherwise.
- 1.6‰ for cyclists, where not in conjunction with any other traffic offense or accident. From 1.6‰, cyclists face the same penalties as driving a car at that limit.

Penalties start at a €500 fine and one-month licence suspension. Above 0.11%, the penalty is a €500 fine and the withdrawal of the driving licence for at least six months, but usually about one year (penalty is set by the court); from 0.16%, reissue of the licence requires a successful medical-psychological assessment (MPU), often referred to as the Idiotentest ("idiot test"). For violators above 1.1‰ within ten years of a prior offence above 0.5‰, there is a minimum €1000 fine and a one-year licence withdrawal; the driver has to successfully pass an MPU and is required to prove to the court that they have been sober for the last twelve months, before they can get their licence back. For repeat offenses, the fine is multiplied by the ordinal of the offence (doubled, tripled, etc.), regardless of the amount by which the driver was over the limit. These minimum penalties are usually exceeded by the German courts. From 1.1‰, the courts usually also require the DUI offender to do unpaid community service.

The same rules for operating an automobile while intoxicated also apply to e-scooters.

In addition to fines, impaired drivers are generally given points in the Fahreignungsregister ("driving aptitude register", colloquially Verkehrssünderkartei, "traffic sinner index"), which is managed by the Kraftfahrt-Bundesamt ("Federal Motor Transport Authority") in Flensburg.

It is legal to consume alcohol while driving, provided the driver remains under the legal blood alcohol limits.

=== Licensing laws ===
==== Off premises ====
Germany does not require any licenses for the production, wholesale, or retail sale of alcoholic beverages.

==== On premises ====
The permit is not required if alcohol-free beverages, free samples, prepared food is sold or administered or in connection with an accommodation establishment beverages and prepared food is delivered to residents. Every other establishment which does not apply to this scheme requires a Gaststättenkonzession. A liquor license is generally required when alcoholic beverages are served or sold for consumption on premises.

===== Rules and regulations =====
On-licence premises have to place a clearly legible notice with the restrictions of the Protection of Young Persons Act (Jugendschutzgesetz) and the bartender must ensure that alcoholic beverages may not be sold or served to underage or visibly intoxicated persons. Operator of a licensed premises are not allowed to force their customers to buy a meal with a drink or change prices if a customer does not order a meal. Changing prices if a customer does not buy an alcoholic drink is also against the law, and every licensee must ensure that there is at least one non alcoholic drink that is cheaper than the cheapest alcoholic drink.

===== Closing hours =====
Closing hours for bars and discotheques are appointed mostly by state legislation. Within the past ten years, many states have abolished the closing hours for licensed establishments. Most states have retained the so-called Putzstunde ("Cleaning hour"), which refers to the 1–2 hours (usually between 5 AM and 6 AM) during which licensed premises are not allowed to serve their customers.

Federal state	City/Municipality	Closing hours	Notes		
Federal state	City/Municipality	Closing hours	Notes	Federal Republic of Germany (federal law)	States have the right to set closing hours for licensed establishments (§ 18 GastG). Under federal law, it is illegal to serve customers outside of the establishment after 10 PM, or 11 PM with permission of the city (Gaststättengesetz).
Baden-Württemberg		Monday-Thursday: 3 AM - 6 AM; Friday & Weekend: 5 AM - 6 AM; Spa Town: 2 AM - 6 AM; Gambling establishments: 12 AM - 6 AM	Cities can permit businesses to apply for an exception to the closing hours.		
Bavaria		5 AM - 6 AM	The closing hours do not apply during the night of 1. January. Cities can permit businesses to apply for an exception to the closing hours.		
Berlin		None	There is no general closing hour for licensed businesses. However, it is against the law if licensed businesses serve their customers outside after 10 PM without permission of the city, if someone files a complaint.		
Brandenburg		None	In 2006, the closing hours for licensed businesses were abolished.		
Bremen		Generally: 2 AM - 6 AM; Friday, Weekend & Bank holidays: None; Gambling establishment: 2 AM - 6 AM	Cities may permit exceptions.		
Hamburg		None	In 2006, the closing hours for licensed businesses were abolished.		
Hesse		Generally: 5 AM - 6 AM; Amusement parks & Fairs: 12 PM - 6 AM; During carnival, 1. May & 1. January: None	Cities can permit exceptions to the general closing hours.		
Lower Saxony		None			
Mecklenburg-Vorpommern		None			
North Rhine-Westphalia		Generally: 5 AM - 6 AM	Cities can permit exceptions to the general closing hours.		
Rhineland-Palatinate		Generally: 5 AM - 6 AM; Saturday, Sunday, Bank holiday or Carnival: None; Amusement parks & Fairs: 10 PM - 6 AM; Gambling establishments: 12 AM - 6 AM	Cities can permit exceptions to the general closing hours.		
Saarland		Generally: 5 AM - 6 AM; 1. January: None; Amusement parks & Fairs: 10 PM - 7 AM; Gambling establishments: 11 PM - 7 AM	Cities can permit exceptions to the general closing hours.		
Saxony		Generally: 5 AM - 6 AM; 1. January, 1. & 2. May: None; Amusement parks, Gambling establishments & Fairs: 10 PM - 6 AM	Cities can permit exceptions to the general closing hours.		
Saxony-Anhalt		None	The closing hours for licensed establishments was abolished in 2015.		
Schleswig-Holstein		None	The closing hours for licensed establishments was abolished in 2005.		
Thuringia		None			

== See also ==
- Alcohol belts of Europe
- Beer in Germany
- Reinheitsgebot
