= State Office for the Protection of the Constitution of Hesse =

The State Office for the Protection of the Constitution of Hesse (LfV HE) is the constitutional protection authority of the state of Hesse. As a higher state authority, it is directly subordinate to the Hessian Ministry of the Interior and Sport and is based in Wiesbaden. The authority, established on July 19, 1951, has 375 employees and is divided into six departments with twenty-two divisions. In Hesse's operating budget, the office is allocated 39.1 million euros for 2023.

== Legal basis and areas of responsibility ==
Organizational chart of the LfV Hessen (2022)

According to Section 2 Paragraph 1 of the Law on the State Office for the Protection of the Constitution (LfV Law) of 19 December 1990 (GVBl. I p. 753), amended on 6 September 2007 (GVBl. I p. 542–545) and most recently by Section 32 of the Hessian Security Review Law of 28 September 2007 (GVBl. I p. 623), the State Office for the Protection of the Constitution of Hesse has the task of enabling the competent authorities to take the necessary measures in good time to avert threats to the free democratic basic order, the existence and security of the federal government and the states. This basically applies to all activities that

- are directed against the free democratic basic order or
- against the existence and security of the Federation or a state or
- aim to illegally impair the conduct of the constitutional bodies of the Federation or a state or their members or
- endanger foreign interests of the Federal Republic of Germany through the use of violence or preparatory actions aimed at this within the scope of the Basic Law.

This mission is implemented by

- Collection and evaluation of information on politically right-wing and left-wing extremist individuals or organizations, as well as Islamist, left-wing or right-wing extremist foreign organizations, which fight their home country or its government with violence from German soil and could thereby bring Germany into foreign policy conflicts or oppose the idea of international understanding.
- Tasks in personnel and material security protection (security and reliability checks)
- Information collection and analysis in the areas of organised crime
- Espionage

The LfV is not interested in political views. Efforts within the meaning of the Constitutional Protection Act are rather only targeted activities that attempt to impair or eliminate the core of our constitution. They are described as anti-constitutional or extremist. They can be expressed through actions such as agitation, preparations for acts of violence or other political activities - even in the run-up to criminal acts.

For the planned new Constitutional Protection Act and for the planned amendment of the Hessian Police Act, the CDU parliamentary group, together with the Green parliamentary group in the Hessian state parliament, received the negative Big Brother Award in the politics category in 2018. Laudator Rolf Gössner described the legislative initiative as a "dangerous accumulation of serious surveillance powers that deeply interfere with fundamental rights and threaten the democratic constitutional state."

== Powers and working methods ==
- The LfV only observes and informs. It has no police powers (e.g. arrests, searches, confiscations, evictions). However, it may collect and evaluate the relevant information if there are actual indications of activities within the meaning of the LfV Act. Neither a specific danger nor a crime committed are necessary to legitimize its action.
- In the area of right-wing extremism, the LfV has set up the Competence Center for Right-Wing Extremism (KOREX). Its central tasks include increased educational and preventive work. KOREX is intended to specifically process specialist knowledge about right-wing extremism.
- Since the Internet is playing an increasingly important role for extremists of all kinds, the LfV has also adapted to this. In the reporting year, a central Internet processing unit, Online Research Team Extremism Terrorism (ORTET), was set up.
- The LfV obtains the information it needs to carry out its tasks from openly accessible sources that are available to every citizen, such as newspapers, the Internet, magazines, brochures, leaflets, archives and other media, as well as from documents from other government agencies.
- In addition to the open gathering of information, the LfV may, under certain conditions, collect information using clandestine means. Such intelligence means are
  - the observation
  - the infiltration or recruitment and management of trusted persons (“sources”) in extremist organisations,
  - secret photography or sound recording,
  - the use of intelligence tools such as cover IDs or cover license plates.
  - Monitoring of letter, postal or telecommunications traffic.

Information obtained through intelligence services cannot generally be used publicly. However, it does enable a proper and qualified evaluation of publicly available information. It is therefore necessary and indispensable for assessing anti-constitutional activities. The State Office for the Protection of the Constitution regularly informs the Parliamentary Control Commission for the Protection of the Constitution and the highest state authorities about its findings. In individual cases, other authorities, such as those responsible for law enforcement, may also be informed of relevant findings by the State Office for the Protection of the Constitution in order to fulfil their mandate.

In 2022, 42.5 percent of employees were female.

== Control ==
The LfV is subject to complex constitutional control. In addition to legal and technical supervision by the Hessian Ministry of the Interior, external controls by the State Commissioner for Data Protection ensure that the legally prescribed framework is not exceeded. Parliamentary control is carried out by the Parliamentary Control Commission for the Protection of the Constitution. Postal and telecommunications surveillance measures under the Article 10 Act are subject to control by the G 10 Commission of the Hessian State Parliament. The budget is subject to strict control by the Hessian Court of Auditors. Last but not least, the Office for the Protection of the Constitution is controlled by the public through public media reporting.

== President ==
Period	Name	Notes
July 1951 – February 1952	Paul Schmidt	
March 1952 – Mai 1954	Arno Maneck (kommissarisch)	
June 1954 – März 1955	Karl Pforr	
April 1955 – June 1957	Wilhelm Leyerer	
June 1957 – November 1967	Kurt Wolf	
December 1967 – April 1976	Werner Heede	
Mai 1976 – August 1980	Roderich Fabian	
August 1980 – October 1991	Günther Scheicher	
1991–1993	Heinz Fromm	President of the Federal Office for the Protection of the Constitution from 2000 to 2012
November 1993 – Juli 1999	Hartmut Ferse	
Juli 1999 – Oktober 2006	Lutz Irrgang	
November 2006 – Mai 2010	Alexander Eisvogel	Then moved to the Federal Office for the Protection of the Constitution as Vice President
Juni 2010 – Februar 2015	Roland Desch	In February, the Hessian Minister of the Interior and Sport Peter Beuth placed him into temporary retirement with immediate effect
February 2015 – December 2022	Robert Schäfer	Until then, he was President of the West Hesse Police Headquarters and was appointed Hessian State Police President in November 2022.
since Februar 2023	Bernd Neumann	until 2015 police officer at the LPP Hessen, since 2018 Vice President of the LfV

== Affairs ==
At the time of the murder of Halit Yozgat, the ninth and last victim of the Nationalist Socialist Underground murder series, on April 6, 2006, the intelligence officer Andreas Temme was in the Internet café where the murder took place. The computer data shows that Temme was still surfing the Internet at 5:01 p.m. At that time, the victim was already dead. The intelligence officer claims not to have noticed the murder. On the day of the murder, Temme spoke to a right-wing extremist twice on the phone: at 1:00 p.m. and at 4:11 p.m. According to a former neighbor, Temme was nicknamed "Little Adolf" in his hometown as a young adult. Temme also has no alibi for six other times when the NSU committed right-wing extremist murders of migrants. In the attic of the intelligence officer, the police found excerpts from Hitler's "Mein Kampf" that had been typed out.

Die Zeit reported on February 24, 2015:

Wiretapped telephone calls from former Federal Office for the Protection of the Constitution employee Andreas Temme, who was at the crime scene at the time, fuel the suspicion, from the lawyers' point of view, that he had "specific knowledge of the planned crime, the time of the crime, the victim and the perpetrators" in advance [...]

In the intercepted telephone conversation between Andreas Temme and the security officer of the LfV, he said:

I tell everyone: If you know that something like this is happening somewhere, please don't drive past.

During an interrogation on April 22, 2006, Andreas Temme stated that he knew a Hells Angel well, who, according to the investigating detective, was presumably the Hells Angels leader Michael S., who was found to be in possession of confidential documents ("VS - for official use only") from the Saxon State Office of Criminal Investigation. The betrayal of official secrets in question has not been solved to this day..

In October 2012, the Office for the Protection of the Constitution overlooked an advertisement in the motorcycle magazine "Biker News" by the right-wing extremist Bernd T., who is imprisoned in Hünfeld Prison, about setting up a right-wing extremist organization called AD Jail Crew, even though the Office for the Protection of the Constitution has a subscription to this magazine.

== Treason cases ==
In 1980, a civil servant in the state office, Richard Kind, was recruited as a double agent by the Main Directorate for Reconnaissance through relatives of his wife after he had gotten into financial difficulties. He was given the code name Bodva (XV 2760/81) and provided a total of 546 source reports; including on suspected cases of counter-espionage, the system for monitoring the whereabouts of emigrants, and code words for queries at residents' registration offices and the Federal Motor Transport Authority. He is said to have received 300 to 500 DM per meeting with his commanding officer.

== Cooperation with other intelligence services ==
"Hesse's Office for the Protection of the Constitution regularly exchanges information with the US Army's military intelligence service stationed in Wiesbaden.“

The Thuringian State Office for the Protection of the Constitution, which received a devastating report from the first Bundestag NSU investigative committee, was set up in the 1990s with the help of Hessian constitutional protection officers.

== Literature ==
- Verfassungsschutz in Hessen – Bericht 2009. Hessisches Ministerium des Innern und für Sport. Central-Druck Trost, Heusenstamm 2010.
