= Office for the Protection of the Constitution of North Rhine-Westphalia =

The Office for the Protection of the Constitution of North Rhine-Westphalia is a German state office for the protection of the constitution based in Düsseldorf.

== Duties and powers ==
The Office for the Protection of the Constitution serves to preserve the free democratic basic order as well as the existence and security of the federal government and the states. It focuses on the use of intelligence resources in the area of violence-oriented efforts and activities. In addition, it informs the public about the dangers to the order posed by efforts and activities, thereby strengthening social awareness.(§ 1 VSG NRW)

Its tasks essentially correspond to those of the Federal Office for the Protection of the Constitution and the other state agencies for the protection of the constitution. It is responsible for collecting and evaluating information, news and documents on efforts to

1. are directed against the Federal Constitutional Court, the existence or security of the Federation or a state, or are intended to unlawfully impair the conduct of the constitutional bodies of the Federation or a state or their members,
2. Security-endangering or intelligence-related activities for a foreign power (counter intelligence),
3. Efforts to endanger the foreign interests of the Federal Republic of Germany through the use of violence or preparatory actions aimed at such use, and
4. Efforts and activities that are directed against the idea of international understanding or the peaceful coexistence of peoples

Within the scope of the Basic Law, insofar as there are actual indications of suspicion of such endeavours and activities.

The duty of the NRW Office for the Protection of the Constitution is also to monitor the Scientology organization.

The NRW Office for the Protection of the Constitution is permitted to process the information required to fulfil its duties, including personal data. It is permitted to use intelligence services to obtain information, provided that this does not conflict with the protection of the core area of private life. These are listed exhaustively in Section 5, Paragraph 2 of the NRW Office for the Protection of the Constitution Act - unlike the Federal Constitutional Protection Act.

== Organisation ==
The Office for the Protection of the Constitution in North Rhine-Westphalia is Department 6 of the Ministry of the Interior of the state of North Rhine-Westphalia. In eight other federal states, the Office for the Protection of the Constitution is also a department of the respective Ministry of the Interior. In seven states, including Bavaria and Saxony, it is an independent authority within the Ministry of the Interior's area of responsibility.

The Department of Constitutional Protection in the Ministry of the Interior is divided into three groups:

- Group 60: Organization and legal affairs of the department, participation matters, surveillance
- Group 61: prevention, ND-Technik, counter-intelligence
- Group 62: reporting, extremism, terrorism

Each group consists of four to five sections.

In 2017, the NRW Office for the Protection of the Constitution was strengthened by 115 positions. Material and investment funds amounted to 10.21 million euros in 2017. At the beginning of 2019, the service had a total of 515 employees.

== Leader ==
The department for the Protection of the Constitution has been headed by:

Period	Name	Notes
01.12.1949 - 31.12.1960	Fritz Tejessy	End of term due to retirement
1960 - 1961	Werner Neumann	(provisional)
1961 - 1977	Helmut Schütz	End of term due to retirement
12.05.1977 - 01.09.1987	Wilfried Graf von Hardenberg	Previously Police Chief in Bochum, end of term due to retirement
04.10.1987 - 31.08.1999	Fritz-Achim Baumann	End of term due to retirement
01.10.1999 - 2009	Hartwig Möller	
2009 - June 2012	Mathilde Koller	was President of the State Office for the Protection of the Constitution in Saxony from December 1992 to April 1996, moved to the Saxon State Chancellery on April 15, 1996, and was State Secretary of the State of Berlin from 2000 to 2002.
Juli 2012 - end of January 2022	Burkhard Freier	was the deputy of the State Commissioner for Data Protection and Freedom of Information NRW from 2001 to 2006
1. März 2022	Jürgen Kayser	

== Control ==
The NRW Office for the Protection of the Constitution is subject to parliamentary, administrative and public control. The North Rhine-Westphalia State Parliament has set up a Parliamentary Control Committee.

== History ==
The agency emerged from the Düsseldorf Information Office, the "Special Department I-J", which was set up by the SPD-led government before the founding of the Federal Republic. The aim was to make the Information Office the nucleus of a domestic intelligence service in the event of an SPD victory in the first federal election in 1949, but this was prevented by the CDU/CSU's election victory. On December 1, 1949, Fritz Tejessy, who had only returned to Germany from American exile in May 1949, took over as director.

The National Democratic Party of Germany functionary Wolfgang Frenz worked as an informant for the North Rhine-Westphalia Office for the Protection of the Constitution from 1961 to 1995. His case was one of the reasons for the failure of the first NPD ban proceedings. In the 2005 Junge Freiheit ruling, the authority was prohibited by the courts from monitoring the right-wing conservative magazine Junge Freiheit.
