= Office for the Protection of the Constitution of Mecklenburg-Vorpommern =

The Mecklenburg-Western Pomerania State Office for the Protection of the Constitution is the state office for the protection of the constitution in Mecklenburg-Western Pomerania and one of 19 intelligence services in Germany. As Department 5, it is part of the Ministry of the Interior and Sport of the State of Mecklenburg-Western Pomerania, based in the state capital Schwerin. It was founded in 1991, and is divided into five departments with over 100 positions and also uses intelligence resources for its tasks. The operating budget amounted to 1.580 million euros in 2019.

== Legal basis ==
The general legal basis for the Office for the Protection of the Constitution is the Basic Law and the Federal Constitutional Protection Act. The specific legal basis is the State Constitutional Protection Act of 11 July 2001.

== Duties ==
The Mecklenburg-Western Pomerania Office for the Protection of the Constitution is responsible for collecting and evaluating factual and personal data, in particular information, news and documents on

1. Efforts directed against the free democratic basic order, the existence or security of the Federation or a state or aimed at unlawfully impairing the conduct of the constitutional bodies of the Federation or a state or their members,
2. Activities endangering security or intelligence activities within the scope of the Basic Law for a foreign power within the scope of this law,
3. Efforts within the scope of the Basic Law which endanger the foreign interests of the Federal Republic of Germany through the use of violence or preparatory actions aimed at such use,
4. Efforts that are directed against the idea of international understanding (Article 9, Paragraph 2 of the Basic Law) or against the peaceful coexistence of peoples (Article 26, Paragraph 1 of the Basic Law).

Another task is to inform the public and the relevant authorities about threats to the free democratic basic order and the existence and security of the federal and state governments, in particular through reports from the Office for the Protection of the Constitution. The Office for the Protection of the Constitution is involved in security checks, reliability checks and technical security measures to protect facts, objects or information that need to be kept secret in the public interest from being accessed by unauthorized persons.

== Powers ==
The Office for the Protection of the Constitution of Mecklenburg-Vorpommern may use intelligence means for the covert gathering of information, in particular for the covert collection of personal data, which are exhaustively listed in Section 10 of the State Constitutional Protection Act. These include the use of informants, undercover employees, surveillance, monitoring of radio traffic, use of legends, cover documents and identification marks, monitoring of letters, post and telecommunications traffic in accordance with Article 10 of the Act and covert monitoring of the Internet. In addition, the Mecklenburg-Western Pomerania Office for the Protection of the Constitution is allowed to inspect files, records and registers kept by public bodies.

== Outline ==
The five departments of the Mecklenburg-Western Pomerania Office for the Protection of the Constitution have the following responsibilities:

- Department 500 – General administrative affairs of the department; Public relations of the Office for the Protection of the Constitution; Information technology
- Department 510 – Fundamental and legal issues of the Office for the Protection of the Constitution and data protection in the Office for the Protection of the Constitution; Legal department of the department; G 10; Counter-espionage; Security
- Department 520 – Political analysis: Right-wing extremism/terrorism
- Department 530 – Operational procurement
- Department 540 – Political analysis: Left-wing and foreign extremism/terrorism

== Leadership ==
Zeitraum	Name	Bemerkung
1991–1994	Volkmar Seidel	was sentenced in November 1996 to a fine of 100,000 marks for taking advantage of government discounts when purchasing private vehicles.
Februar 1995–2001	Elmar Ruhlich (* 1943)	The SPD member was previously a ministerial counsellor in the Office for the Protection of the Constitution in Schleswig-Holstein, dismissed in 2001 due to inability to lead by Interior Minister Gottfried Timm (SPD) after the agency was investigated from outside, including after an arson attack by an undercover agent in 1999 in Grevesmühlen.
	Friedrich-Wilhelm Heidemeier Direktor des LKA MV 1995	Inspekteur der Landespolizei 1998
2002 – März 2009	Jürgen Lambrecht	was involved in the development of the Ministry of the Interior in the policy and personnel department and previously author of the brochure Betr. Engholm during his time as a consultant in the Schleswig-Holstein State Chancellery.
April 2009 – Januar 2021	Reinhard Müller	was previously head of the Police Department in the Ministry of the Interior. His deputy was Michael Flenker
seit Januar 2021	Thomas Krense	previously Head of Department in the Ministry of the Interior of Mecklenburg-Vorpommern, before that Chief of Staff of the State Criminal Police Office of Mecklenburg-Vorpommern

== Control ==
The Office for the Protection of the Constitution of Mecklenburg-Vorpommern is subject to various controls. These include general parliamentary control by the members of the Landtag of Mecklenburg-Vorpommern due to the reporting obligations of the Minister for the Interior and Sport in the context of current affairs, minor and major inquiries or petitions. There is also special parliamentary control by the Parliamentary Control Commission (PKK) of the State Parliament and the State Parliament can set up investigative committees. Postal checks and telephone surveillance must be approved by the State Parliament's G-10 Commission. The State Commissioner for Data Protection and Freedom of Information monitors compliance with data protection regulations and his right to inspect files. The Mecklenburg-Western Pomerania State Audit Office has a right of review with regard to the budget. The actions of the Office for the Protection of the Constitution can be judicially reviewed on an ad hoc basis. Ultimately, the Office for the Protection of the Constitution is subject to constant and intensive monitoring by the public and the media, who critically assess its tasks and work.

== Controversies ==
A thank you note to the NSU in the neo-Nazi newspaper “Der Weiße Wolf” in 2002 was not given much importance by the Office for the Protection of the Constitution. However, the Office for the Protection of the Constitution claims that there were no references or references to the NSU in the publication and that the NSU was unknown to the Office for the Protection of the Constitution until November 2011.

In its report for 2011, the Mecklenburg-Western Pomerania Office for the Protection of the Constitution is no longer allowed to name several left-wing institutions. It had temporarily taken the report off the internet because several legal disputes were pending. It was later republished, with some parts about left-wing groups and institutions blacked out - but incomplete.

In the investigations into the Nordkreuz group since 2017, the Office for the Protection of the Constitution was accused of being largely ignorant of right-wing extremist activities in the country and of failing to inform the Interior Minister.

In the investigations into the Nordkreuz group since 2017, the Office for the Protection of the Constitution was accused of being largely ignorant of right-wing extremist activities in the country and of failing to inform the Interior Minister. Angeblich hielten die Vorgesetzten beide nicht für glaubwürdig. Öffentlich bekannt wurde das erst im November 2020. Der darauf vor den Untersuchungsausschuss des Deutschen Bundestages zum Anschlag am Breitscheidplatz vorgeladene Verfassungsschutz-Chef Reinhard Müller verweigerte weitgehendere Auskünfte. After the summons of State Secretary Thomas Lenz, the impression arose that the authority was in a chaotic state, but he rejected this the following day by characterising the employee in a derogatory manner.

On 13 January 2021, Müller was placed into temporary retirement and the vice president of the State Criminal Police Office, Thomas Krense, was appointed as the new head of the Office for the Protection of the Constitution. The new Interior Minister Torsten Renz appointed an expert commission to review the matter. The commission's composition, made up of experts from other federal states for the protection of the constitution, was criticized for being biased. The Commission identified serious deficiencies in the Authority in more than one individual case.
