= State Office for the Protection of the Constitution of Bremen =

Domestic intelligence agency in Germany

The State Office for the Protection of the Constitution Bremen is the state authority for the protection of the constitution in the German state of Bremen. Thorge Koehler has been the head since May 1, 2023. The Authority is supervised by the Senator for the Interior (Department IV).

== Legal basis ==
The State Office for the Protection of the Constitution of the Free Hanseatic City of Bremen and its employees work on the principles of the Federal Constitutional Protection Act (BremVerfSchG), the Bremen Security Screening Act (BremSÜG), the Anti-Terrorism File Act (ATDG) and the Article 10 Act (G 10). The company cooperates with other state authorities for the protection of the constitution. The legal regulation of the Federal Constitutional Protection Act (BVerfSchG) ensures that citizens' data protection is protected and is subject to the principle of proportionality. The security screening of individuals is only permitted on a legal basis. The requirements for a screening can be found in the Bremen Security Screening Act.

== Duties ==
The primary goal of the Office for the Protection of the Constitution in the state of Bremen is to guarantee and protect the free democratic basic order, as well as the security of the federal government and the states. In this regard, the State Office for the Protection of the Constitution of the Free Hanseatic City of Bremen collects and evaluates information, including using intelligence services, on efforts against the free democratic basic order. This includes the phenomena of right-wing extremism, left-wing extremism, foreign extremism, fundamentalism of all kinds and the Scientology organization. Counter-espionage is also one of the tasks of the Office for the Protection of the Constitution Bremen. The Office for the Protection of the Constitution is an element of a defensive democracy. The LfV's findings are published in the annual report on the protection of the constitution

== Control ==
The State Office for the Protection of the Constitution of the Free and Hanseatic City of Bremen is controlled, among others, by the Parliamentary Control Commission of the Bremen Parliament, the courts and the Bremen Data Protection Commissioner.

== Budget and personnel ==
In the 2020 financial year, the authority had a staff of 72 full-time equivalents and financial resources of EUR 3.728 million for personnel and EUR 1.353 million for material resources; a total of EUR 5.081 million. In the previous year, there were 70 full-time equivalents and EUR 3.557 million in personnel costs and EUR 1.153 million for material resources; a total of EUR 4.710 million.

In the 2018 financial year, the Bremen Office for the Protection of the Constitution had an amount of 2,943,577 euros for personnel and 1,181,968 euros for material resources. In addition, there were investment expenditures of 313,200 euros. The total budget in 2018 was therefore 4,438,745 euros. The employment volume comprised 65.5 full-time positions.

== History ==
In October 1949, the Senate of the Free Hanseatic City of Bremen decided to set up an authority that later became the LfV. In 1954, the authority employed 24 people. The first head of the office was the police officer and trade unionist Heinz Klemmer. The actual expert in intelligence activities was his deputy, Hans Meisner. In 1955, he was to move to the Military Counterintelligence Service (MAD) and set up the Bundeswehr's School of Intelligence.
