= Federal Trunk Road Authority =

Federal authority in Germany

- Fernstraßen-Bundesamt (FBA)

Agency overview
- Formed: 1 October 2018
- Jurisdiction: Germany
- Headquarters: Leipzig, Saxony, Germany
- Employees: 1,234
- Annual budget: €35.4 million (2020)
- Minister responsible: Doris Drescher, President
- Parent department: Federal Ministry for Digital and Transport
- Website: fba.bund.de

The Federal Trunk Road Authority (FBA; German: Fernstraßen-Bundesamt) is a supervisory and approval authority at the federal level in Germany for federal motorways (BAB) and other federal highways with headquarters in Leipzig. Established on 1 October 2018 as a supreme federal authority, it operates under the jurisdiction of the Federal Ministry for Digital and Transport (BMDV). The first president of the authority, since 1 March 2020, is Doris Drescher.

== History ==
In the context of the reorganization of federal-state financial relations in 2017, the Federal Trunk Roads Administration was restructured. The act to establish the Federal Trunk Road Authority came into force on 18 August 2017. The Federal Ministry for Digital and Transport issued an organizational decree to set up the authority.

As of 1 January 2021, federal motorways transitioned from state-level contract management to direct federal administration. The federal government plans, constructs, operates, maintains, and manages the motorways, utilizing Die Autobahn GmbH des Bundes, a federally owned limited liability company.

The Federal Trunk Road Authority is responsible for the sovereign tasks not handled directly by the BMDV or delegated to the Autobahn GmbH. The authority began operations on 1 January 2021, following a preparatory phase.

== Responsibilities ==
The Federal Trunk Road Authority is responsible for:

- Legal and technical supervision of Autobahn GmbH's sovereign tasks;
- Determination of alignment, plan approval, and plan permissions for federal motorway projects;
- Dedication, reclassification, and de-dedication under Section 2 of the Federal Trunk Roads Act;
- Supporting the BMDV in federal highway matters, including:
  - Oversight of state-level contract management
  - Development of legal and administrative regulations
  - International cooperation.

== Organization ==
The authority is divided into four departments, each with four to five divisions:

- Department P: Public hearings and plan approvals
- Department S: Road law and supervision
- Department B: Construction and traffic engineering
- Department Z: Central services
