= Office for the Protection of the Constitution of Saxony-Anhalt =

The Office for the Protection of the Constitution of Saxony-Anhalt is an intelligence service and the state authority for the protection of the constitution in Saxony-Anhalt, based in Magdeburg. Organizationally, it is a department in the Ministry of the Interior and Sport of Saxony-Anhalt. Its tasks are to combat extremism and espionage, for which it also uses intelligence resources. For this purpose, it had 111 posts/jobs and 814,000 euros at its disposal in 2019.

== History ==
When the law on the protection of the constitution in Saxony-Anhalt came into force on July 30, 1992, the then State Office for the Protection of the Constitution in Saxony-Anhalt began its work. Klaus-Dieter Matschke, a former senior detective and owner of the Frankfurt-based company KDM Sicherheitsconsulting, was involved in setting up the State Office for the Protection of the Constitution in Saxony-Anhalt.

With the law amending the law on the protection of the constitution in the state of Saxony-Anhalt of 30 March 1999, the State Office for the Protection of the Constitution of Saxony-Anhalt was incorporated as a separate department into the then Ministry of the Interior (now: Ministry of the Interior and Sport) of the state of Saxony-Anhalt.

Since January 12, 2021, the authority has classified the state association of the Alternative for Germany party as a suspected case, which in principle allows the use of intelligence resources within the framework of the legal requirements, such as the principle of proportionality.

In 2022, approximately 30 percent of employees were female.

== Legal basis ==
In particular, the following laws regulate the activities of the Office for the Protection of the Constitution in Saxony-Anhalt:

- Basic Law for the Federal Republic of Germany: Art. 73 and Art. 87 GG
- Federal Protection of the Constitution Act (BVerfSchG)
- Law on the Protection of the Constitution in the State of Saxony-Anhalt
- Law on the Protection of the Constitution in the State of Saxony-Anhalt (VerfSchG-LSA)
- Law implementing the Article 10 Law of the State of Saxony-Anhalt (AGG 10-LSA)
- Security screening and secrecy protection law of the state of Saxony-Anhalt (SÜG-LSA)

== Duties ==
Section 4 VerfSchG-LSA defines the tasks of the Saxony-Anhalt Office for the Protection of the Constitution

The task of the Office for the Protection of the Constitution is to collect and evaluate information, in particular factual and personal information, news and documents on

1. Efforts directed against the free democratic basic order, the existence or security of the Federation or a state or aimed at unlawfully impairing the conduct of the constitutional bodies of the Federation or a state or their members,
2. continuing structures and activities of the intelligence and defence services of the former German Democratic Republic, in particular the Ministry for State Security or the Office for National Security, within the meaning of Sections 94 to 99, 129, 129a of the Criminal Code,
3. activities that endanger security or are carried out for a foreign power within the scope of the Basic Law
4. Efforts within the scope of the Basic Law that endanger the foreign interests of the Federal Republic of Germany through the use of violence or preparatory actions aimed at such use,
5. Efforts that are directed against the idea of international understanding (Article 9, Paragraph 2 of the Basic Law), in particular the peaceful coexistence of peoples (Article 26, Paragraph 1 of the Basic Law).

The Office for the Protection of the Constitution also cooperates at the request of the relevant public authorities

1. in the security screening of persons in accordance with the Security Screening and Security Protection Act and in reliability checks,
2. in the case of technical security measures to protect facts, objects or information which need to be kept secret in the public interest against access by unauthorised persons.

== Leadership ==
Period	Name	Notes
1992–1999	Wolfgang Heidelberg	
2000-2012	Volker Limburg	Resigned due to mistakes in the investigation of the NSU terror. He was previously head of the State Police.
Since 14.09.2012	Jochen Hollmann	He was previously deputy head of the State Criminal Police Office of Saxony-Anhalt and head of the Police State Protection Department.

== Control ==
The Office for the Protection of the Constitution of Saxony-Anhalt is subject to control by the State Parliament of Saxony-Anhalt. This task is carried out in particular by the Parliamentary Control Committee. It meets in secret and its members are sworn to secrecy. The state government must inform the Parliamentary Control Committee comprehensively about the general activities of the Saxony-Anhalt Office for the Protection of the Constitution and about events of particular importance. The Parliamentary Control Committee, which consists of five members of the State Parliament, meets at least quarterly. It has the right to provide information, inspect documents, access to facilities of the Office for the Protection of the Constitution and to hear informants.

The Office for the Protection of the Constitution is also monitored by the State Commissioner for Data Protection, the State Audit Office and the courts.

With regard to measures under the Act on the Restriction of the Secrecy of Letters, Posts and Telecommunications (Act on Article 10 of the Basic Law) and the exercise of special powers to obtain information under Section 17a of the Constitutional Protection Act-LSA, control is carried out by a G 10 Commission specially appointed for this purpose by the Parliamentary Control Committee.
