= Federal Ministry for Transport =

Cabinet-level ministry in Germany

- Bundesministerium für Verkehr

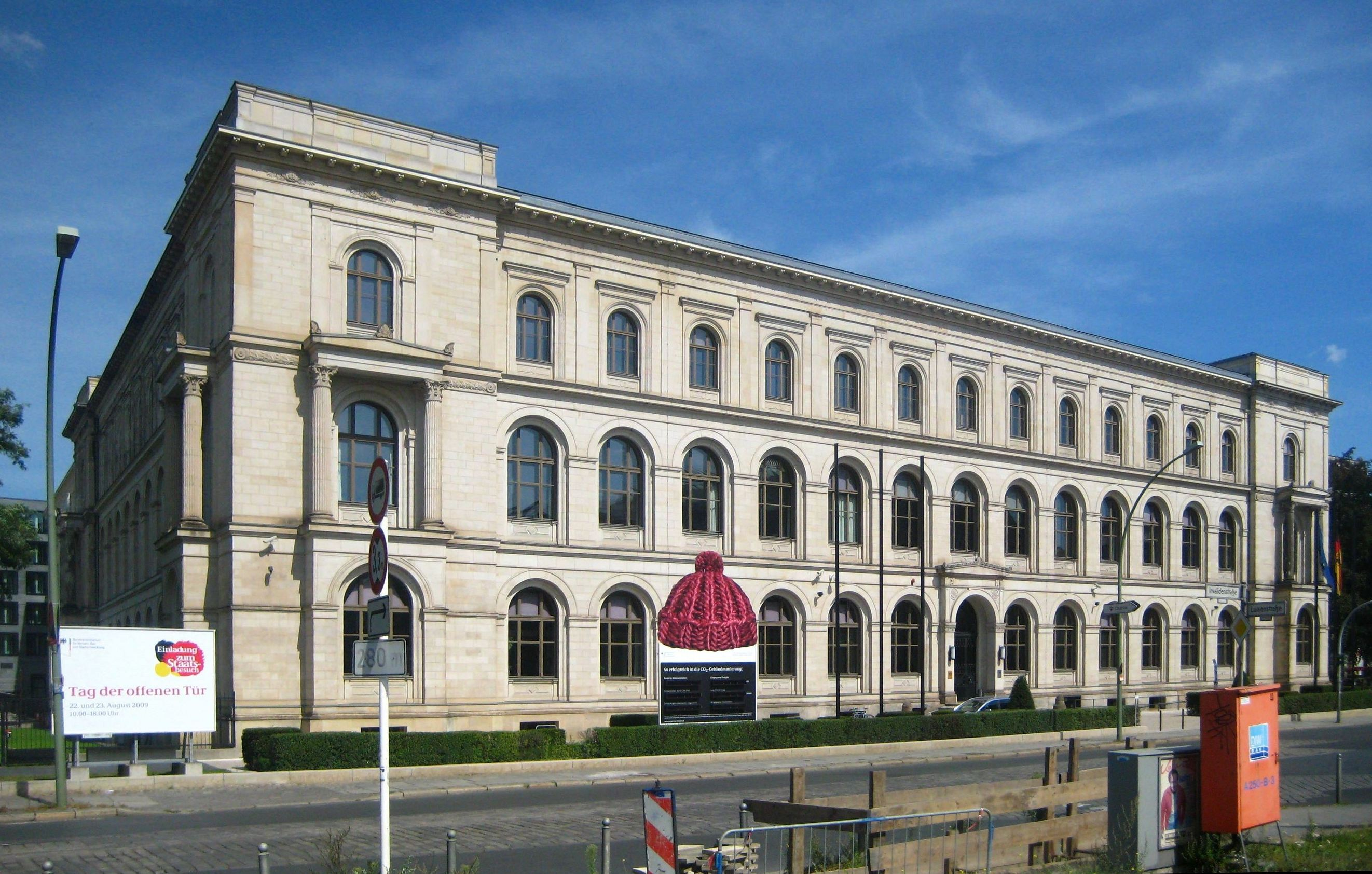

Agency overview
- Formed: 20 September 1949
- Jurisdiction: Government of Germany
- Headquarters: Invalidenstraße 44, Berlin; 52°31′46.58″N 13°22′42.10″E
- Employees: 1,300
- Annual budget: €41.154 billion (2021)
- Minister responsible: Steffen Bilger, Federal Minister for Transport
- Website: www.bmv.de/EN/Home/home.html

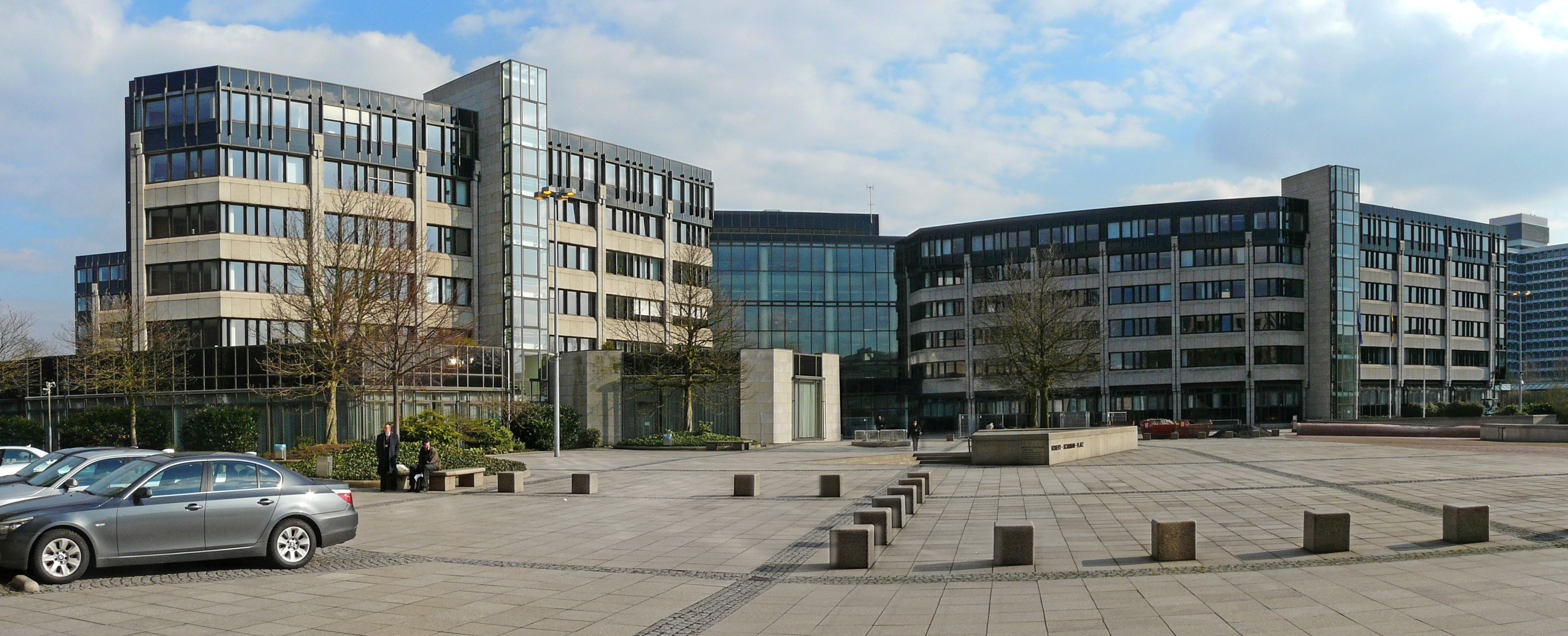
Second office in Bonn

The Federal Ministry for Transport (German: Bundesministerium für Verkehr, German pronunciation: [ˈbʊndəsminɪsˌteːʁiʊm fyːɐ̯ fɐˈkeːɐ̯]; abbreviated BMV) is a cabinet-level ministry of the Federal Republic of Germany. Its main office is located in Berlin, while the majority of its civil servants and employees work in Bonn, the secondary seat.

The Ministry itself has about 1300 employees. At the top is the Federal Minister, and there are two Parliamentary Secretaries, who are also Member of the Bundestag, and two civil servant undersecretaries. The ministry oversees 63 downstream agencies and authorities where around 25,000 people work.

The agency was formed through the merger of the former Federal Ministry of Transport and the Federal Ministry of Regional Planning, Building and Urban Development, both established in 1949. The merged ministry was at first named Federal Ministry of Transport, Building and Housing until it adopted the name Federal Ministry of Transport, Building and Urban Development (BMVBS) in 2005. On December 17, 2013, it was renamed to Federal Ministry of Transport and Digital Infrastructure (BMVI) through an organizational decree by the Merkel III Cabinet. A decree issued by Olaf Scholz upon assuming chancellorship on December 8, 2021, led to the ministry receiving its current designation.

After German reunification, politicians from the New states of Germany often headed the ministry, which had large responsibility over rebuilding the crumbling infrastructure left over from former East Germany. Günther Krause was the first minister after the 1990 German federal election and in 2002, former Minister-President of Brandenburg Manfred Stolpe was appointed, after his successor as Minister-President, then-Mayor of Potsdam Matthias Platzeck had refused the job in 1998. Stolpe was succeeded by then-Mayor of Leipzig Wolfgang Tiefensee, who had refused the job similarly to Platzeck in 2002.

== Responsibilities ==
The ministry, together with its subordinate agencies, is responsible for all federal portfolio tasks which touch the mobility of people, goods, services and data.

The responsibilities extends to the federal transport infrastructure (Autobahn, federal motorways, railway networks, waterways and air traffic) as well as to the widespread availability of modern broadband networks across Germany. Hence, the ministry develops legal policies and ensures the safety of the modes of transport, respectively. Additionally, it ensures the seamless planning and financing of investments for maintenance and development of infrastructures.

The main focus in the field of digital infrastructure is a comprehensive supply of fast Internet with a transmission speed of at least 50 Mbps). Another task is to modernise mobility (alternative fuels, interconnected and intelligent transport system). This includes, e.g., the establishment of 'Digitales Testfeld Autobahn' to test innovative vehicle technologies. The ministry is also responsible for the Galileo satellite navigation system and the Copernicus Programme of the European Union.

== Authorities and shares ==
The ministry has 18 federal authorities and federal agencies directly subordinate to it:

- Federal Logistics and Mobility Office (Bundesamt für Logistik und Mobilität)
- The Federal Maritime and Hydrographic Agency (German: Bundesamt für Seeschiffahrt und Hydrographie (BSH)) located in St. Pauli, Hamburg, provides among other things information of all matters of maritime shipping, to special funding programmes, law of flag, certification of mariners and information of the coasts and coastal waters of Germany.
- Federal Institute of Hydrology (Bundesanstalt für Gewässerkunde)
- Federal Highway Research Institute (German: Bundesanstalt für Straßenwesen (BASt)) located in purpose built facilities in Bergisch Gladbach since 1983, with a focus on aspects of road engineering. Its mission is the improvement of safety, environmental compatibility, efficiency and performance relating to roads.
- Federal Agency for Administrative Services (Bundesanstalt für Verwaltungsdienstleistungen)
- Federal Waterways Engineering and Research Institute (Bundesanstalt für Wasserbau)
- Federal Supervisory Authority for Air Navigation Services (Bundesaufsichtsamt für Flugsicherung)
- Federal Railway Property Agency (Bundeseisenbahnvermögen)
- Federal Rail Accident Investigation Body (Bundesstelle für Eisenbahnunfalluntersuchung)
- Federal Bureau of Aircraft Accident Investigation (Bundesstelle für Flugunfalluntersuchung)
- Federal Bureau of Maritime Casualty Investigation (Bundesstelle für Seeunfalluntersuchung)
- German Meteorological Service (Deutscher Wetterdienst)
- Federal Railway Authority (Eisenbahn-Bundesamt)
- Federal Trunk Road Authority (Fernstraßen-Bundesamt)
- Central Command for Maritime Emergencies (Havariekommando)
- Federal Motor Transport Authority (Kraftfahrt-Bundesamt)
- Federal Aviation Office (Luftfahrt-Bundesamt)
- Federal Waterways and Shipping Administration (Wasserstraßen- und Schifffahrtsverwaltung des Bundes)

The Federation, represented by the ministry, holds shares in the following private companies with business activities:

- 100 % Autobahn GmbH des Bundes
- 100 % Deutsche Bahn AG
- 100 % Deutsche Flugsicherung GmbH
- 100 % Flughafenkoordination Deutschland GmbH
- 100 % NOW GmbH (Nationale Organisation Wasserstoff- und Brennstoffzellentechnologie)
- 100 % Toll Collect
- 49,02 % Internationale Mosel-Gesellschaft
- 29,08 % DEGES (Deutsche Einheit Fernstraßenplanungs- und -bau GmbH)
- 26 % Flughafen Berlin Brandenburg GmbH
- 31 % Flughafen Köln/Bonn GmbH
- 26 % Flughafen München GmbH

== See also ==
- Internet in Germany
- Transport in Germany
