= Berlin Office for the Protection of the Constitution =

German intelligence service

- Formation: March 5, 1951; 75 years ago
- Headquarters: Klosterstraß, Berlin, Germany
- Budget: 16.58 Million EUR
- Employees: 257 (2020)
- Website: Official website

The Berlin Office for the Protection of the Constitution is an intelligence service and the State Office for the Protection of the Constitution in Berlin, based in Klosterstrasse in Mitte. Its tasks include the prevention of extremism and espionage, for which it also uses intelligence resources. In 2019, it had around 257 employees and a budget of 16.58 million euros. The Office for the Protection of the Constitution, founded in 1951, is headed by Michael Fischer. In organizational terms, it is not an independent authority, but forms Department II of the Senate Department for the Interior and Sport with seven departments.

== History ==
On March 5, 1951, the Berlin Office for the Protection of the Constitution was founded. In 2000, the Office for the Protection of the Constitution moved from Zehlendorf to Kleistpark in Schöneberg. In December 2000, the Berlin State Office for the Protection of the Constitution was dissolved by Interior Senator Eckart Werthebach due to several scandals and assigned to Department II of the Senate Department for the Interior. This means that the Berlin Office for the Protection of the Constitution is no longer an independent authority, as are the state authorities for the protection of the constitution in seven other federal states. The office is currently located at Klosterstraße 47 in Berlin-Mitte.

== Duties and organization ==
=== Duties ===
The Berlin Office for the Protection of the Constitution is tasked with collecting and analyzing information about political extremism and espionage and passing this on to political decision-makers and the public. The work of the Office for the Protection of the Constitution is determined by this triad of information gathering, information processing and information dissemination.

=== Organization ===
Department II – Constitutional Protection is divided into the following seven departments (2023):

- Section Wi/GSB – economic and secret Protection, participation Matters
- Section II A – principle, law, data protection, information technology, public relations, administration
- Section II B – Right-wing extremism
- Section II C – Salafism und Islamistic terrorism Bestrebungen
- Section II D – counterintelligence, Islamism, extremism related to foreign organizations, prevention
- Section II E – procuring human intelligence
- Section II F – left-wing extremism

== Known informants ==
- Ulrich Schmücker (2 June Movement) – the trial surrounding his death is considered a judicial scandal because the proceedings – as officially stated – were manipulated on many occasions and massively obstructed by the Office for the Protection of the Constitution and at least two public prosecutors.
- Karl-Albrecht Tiemann
- Peter Urbach, called “S-Bahn-Peter”. On April 11, 1968, he supplied demonstrators against the Springer Group “with a good dozen ready-to-use Molotov cocktails” and supplied bombs and weapons to people from the Berlin Außerparlamentarische Opposition, who later became founding members of the Red Army Faction. He also supplied the bomb for the attack on the Jewish community center in Berlin in 1969.
- Volker Weingraber

== Scandals and controversies ==
The Office for the Protection of the Constitution is accused of covering up the murder of Ulrich Schmücker in 1974.

In the years before reunification, “well over a million marks [...] were spent without ‘comprehensible justification’ to ‘protect a single secret employee and his contact in the office’. At least three former Stasi officers were officially employed as informants by the Berlin Office for the Protection of the Constitution.

In June 2012, the Berlin Office for the Protection of the Constitution destroyed 25 files that “might have been of interest to the Bundestag’s NSU investigative committee.”

=== Publication of an internal documents ===
At the beginning of January 2021, a 43-page internal paper on the AfD Berlin's loyalty to the constitution was sent to the AfD parliamentary group in the Berlin House of Representatives with a covering letter from the ranks of the Berlin Office for the Protection of the Constitution. The document, which is an uncoordinated working version of the department responsible for right-wing extremism, denies the classification of the Berlin AfD as a suspected case and is intended to trivialize openly right-wing extremist statements. However, various experts see blatant scientific, methodological and technical errors in the published papers. The Berlin Senate distanced itself from the paper and the head of the department responsible, who was previously responsible for the “Islamism and Islamist Terrorism” department and was unable to prevent the attack on the Berlin Christmas market at the Memorial Church by Anis Amri, was “released from his official duties” until further notice. “Initial technical security measures were initiated within Department II (Office for the Protection of the Constitution)” to find out which person passed the document classified as “classified – for official use only” (VS-NfD) to the unauthorized AfD.

== Lineage ==
=== Landesamt für Verfassungsschutz (1951–2000) ===
Period	Name	Notes
1951–1952	Werner Otto	From March 1951, first head of the Office for the Protection of the Constitution; former district court judge
1952–1953	Gotthard Friedrich	
1953–1965	Heinz Wiechmann	Dismissed on February 8, 1965, by Berlin's mayor Heinrich Albertz after, despite being asked, he denied three times in a row that there was any evidence of visits by celebrities to the Pension Clausewitz.
1965–1966	Heinz Fahs	
1966–1974	Eberhard Zachmann	
1975–1986	Franz Natusch	Involvement in the cover-up of the murder of Ulrich Schmücker
1986–1989	Dieter Wagner	1973–1986 President of the Office for Protection of the Constitution of Baden-Württemberg
1990–1995	Heinz Annussek	
1995–2000	Eduard Vermander	1977–1987 Police President im State Criminal Police Office of Baden-Württemberg, 1988–1995 President of theState Office for the Protection of the Constitution of Baden-Württemberg

=== Verfassungsschutz Berlin (since 1 July 2000) ===
Period	Name	Notes
01.07.2000–31.12.2000	Bernhard Dybowski	Acting management while State Secretary Mathilde Koller reduced the number of employees by around 30 and had a new secret service law drawn up.
01.01.2001–14.11.2012	Claudia Schmid	Resignation after scandal surrounding the destruction of files on right-wing extremism with possible links to the Nationalist Socialist Underground.
19.11.2012–15.09.2018	Bernd Palenda	until 19 August 2013 acting Senate Director Palenda was previously responsible for the supervision of the Berlin Police Service
since 21.11.2018	Michael Fischer	previously provisionally led by Katharina Fest

== Legal basis ==
- Grundgesetz für die Bundesrepublik Deutschland: Art. 73 und Art. 87 GG
- Bundesverfassungsschutzgesetz
- Gesetz zur Beschränkung des Brief-, Post- und Fernmeldegeheimnisses
- Law implementing the law on Article 10 of the Basic Law
- Law on the Protection of the Constitution in Berlin (VSG Bln)
- Security Clearance Act
- Berlin Security Screening Act
- Security screening determination regulation
- Aviation Security Act
