= Office for the Protection of the Constitution of Schleswig-Holstein =

The Office for the Protection of the Constitution of Schleswig-Holstein is a department of the state's Ministry of the Interior and is therefore not an independent authority like in other federal states. Its office building is in Kiel. It uses intelligence resources for its tasks.

== Legal basis ==
The legal basis is the Law on the Protection of the Constitution in the State of Schleswig-Holstein of 23 March 1991. Article 10 of the Law also applies.

== Organisation ==
Department IV 7 of the Ministry is divided into eight departments:

- Principles and central services
- Intelligence gathering
- Analysis of right-wing extremism
- Analysis of Islamism and Islamist terrorism
- Analysis of left-wing extremism and extremism with foreign connections, counter-espionage and economic protection
- Observation and intelligence technology
- Digital work, technical reconnaissance and analysis support, IT, secrecy protection and IT security
- Data protection, operational security and press and public relations

In 2022, it had approximately 130 employees.

== Leadership ==
The head of the Office for the Protection of the Constitution has been lawyer Torsten Holleck Torsten Holleck, since March 2022. His predecessors were Joachim Albrecht from 2018 to 2022 and Dieter Büddefeld from 2011 to 2018. Horst Eger headed the Office for the Protection of the Constitution from 2005 to 2011, with a break of several months in 2009.
