= Harry Waibel =

German historian

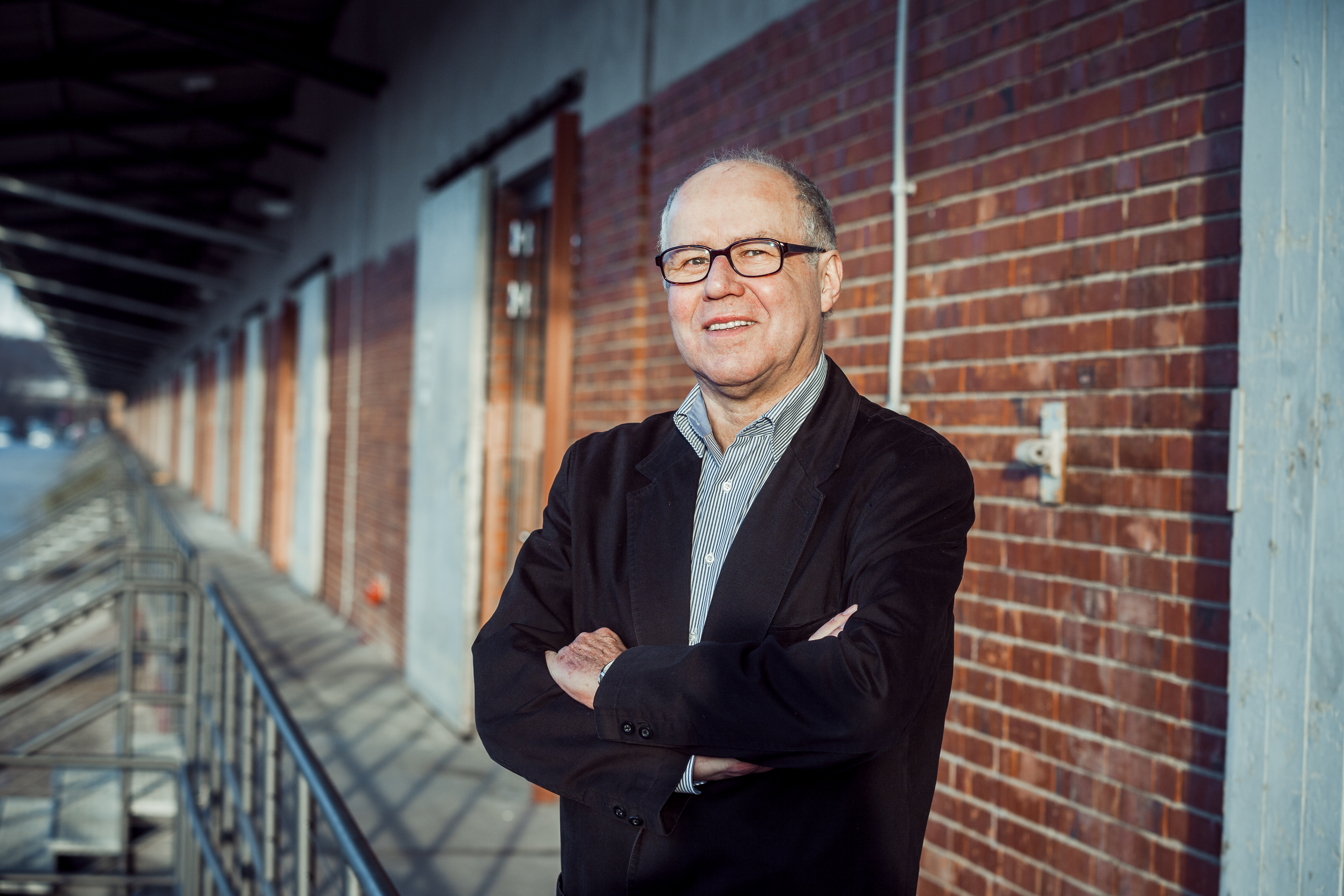
Harry Waibel 2016

Harry Weibel (born 20 June 1946) is a German historian. His main topics are neo-Nazism, right-wing extremism and antisemitism in the GDR and racism in Germany from 1945 to the present.

== Life ==
Born in Lörrach, Waibel comes from a working-class family. He graduated in 1962 with mittlere Reife and then completed an apprenticeship as an industrial clerk. After his discharge from the Bundeswehr he worked in different companies as a commercial clerk. According to his own statements he took part in actions of the extra-parliamentary opposition in Lörrach in the Republikanischer Club and in Basel and was active in 1969 against the NPD Baden-Württemberg, which had been elected to the Baden-Württemberg State Parliament since 1968.

Via the Zweiter Bildungsweg, Waibel began a Teacher training at the Pädagogische Hochschule Freiburg. As a member of the Sozialistisches Büro and the Sozialistischer Bund (1962) he was politically active in Freiburg im Breisgau, among other things also in favor of squatting. Waibel wrote for Alternativpresse "Sumpfblüte" and "Links unten".

He continued his studies at the Free University of Berlin and finished them with a diploma in education. In 1993 he was awarded a doctorate by Wolfgang Benz at the Center for Research on Antisemitism of Technische Universität Berlin with a study on neo-Nazism, antisemitism and racism in the GDR under the title Rechtsextremisten in der DDR bis 1989. Both courses of study and the doctorate were financially supported by the union's own Hans-Böckler-Stiftung.

Waibel researches in the archives of the Stasi Records Agency and the German Federal Archives (SAPMO) on racism in the GDR.

He lives and works as a freelance journalist and historian in Berlin.

== Work and reception ==
In his book Rechtsextremisten in der DDR bis 1989, Waibel argues, among other things, that the authoritarian structure of the GDR was particularly effective against young people and was an essential prerequisite for young people to adopt xenophobic and profascist attitudes. Bureaucracy and centralism had been the ideal breeding ground for right-wing extremist attitudes. The GDR leadership had created an authoritarian state that made it easy for right-wing extremists to find social connections.

In 2011 Waibel published the book Diener vieler Herren. Critics note that the early entry of young people into the NSDAP does not allow any conclusions to be drawn about their actual later attitudes.

== Publications ==
=== Monographs ===
- Rechtsextremismus in der DDR bis 1989. (PapyRossa-Hochschulschriften. Vol. 11). Papyrossa Verlag, Cologne 1996, ISBN 3-89438-109-4 (dissertation, TU Berlin, 1993).
- Diener vieler Herren. Ehemalige NS-Funktionäre in der SBZ/DDR. Peter Lang publishing house, Frankfurt 2011, ISBN 978-3-631-63542-1.
- Rassisten in Deutschland. Peter Lang, Frankfurt 2012, ISBN 978-3-631-63848-4.
- Der gescheiterte Anti-Faschismus der SED. Rassismus in der DDR. Peter Lang, Frankfurt, 29. April 2014, ISBN 978-3-631-65073-8.
- Die braune Saat. Antisemitismus und Neonazismus in der DDR. Schmetterling Verlag, Stuttgart, 1. edition 2017, ISBN 3-89657-153-2.
- Die braune Saat. Antisemitismus und Neonazismus in der DDR / 2. part, e-Dokumentation. Schmetterling Verlag, Stuttgart, 2018, ISBN 3-89657-168-0.

=== Articles in anthologies ===
- Jugendliche Rechtsextremisten in der DDR und die Reaktionen der FDJ. In Helga Gotschlich (ed.): "Links und links und Schritt gehalten …" Die FDJ: Konzepte, Abläufe, Grenzen. Metropol Verlag, Berlin 1994, ISBN 3-926893-60-5, pp. 76–289.
- Neofaschisten in der DDR. In Manfred Büttner (ed.): Braune Saat in jungen Köpfen. Volume 1 Theorie und Ideologie des Rechtsextremismus und Nationalsozialismus in Geschichte und Gegenwart. Schneider Verlag, Baltmannsweiler 1999, ISBN 3-89676-147-1; pp. 57–65.

=== Articles in newspapers ===
- Neofaschismus in Ostdeutschland. In Ost-West-Gegeninformationen, Vierteljahresschrift. Nr. 4/1996, Dossier.
- Rechtsextremismus in der DDR. In Deutsche Lehrerzeitung (DLZ). 28 March 1996, 13th edition, p. 7.
- Kritik des Antisemitismus in der DDR. In Sozial.Geschichte. Issue 3/2006
- Kritik des Anti-Faschismus in der DDR. In sozial.geschichte.extra. 3 December 2007 (PDF).
- Verleugnende Verdrängung. Rassisten in der DDR und die Folgen bis heute. In Kritiknetz – Zeitschrift für kritische Theorie der Gesellschaft. 2013 (PDF).
- Betrachtungen über die Diskussionskultur von Linken in Deutschland. In Zeitschrift antirassistischer Gruppen (ZAG). Number 64/2013, Berlin, p. 18.
- Krise des Anti-Faschismus. In Zeitschrift antirassistischer Gruppen (ZAG). Number 66/2014.
- Rassismus in der DDR. Über den gescheiterten Antifaschismus der SED. In Gerbergasse 18. Thüringer Vierteljahresschrift für Zeitgeschichte und Politik. 2/2015 edition. Issue 75, Jena, p. 41.
- Der gescheiterte Antifaschismus der SED. In Kritiknetz – Zeitschrift für kritische Theorie der Gesellschaft. 2015 (PDF, 232 kB).
- Rassismus in der DDR. In Zeitschrift des Forschungsverbundes SED-Staat. Edition Nr. 39/2016, p. 111.
- Review by Claudia Pawlowitsch: Die braune Saat. Antisemitismus und Neonazismus in der DDR. Neues Archiv für sächsische Geschichte 90 (2019) reviews, pp. 373–375
