= Office for the Protection of the Constitution of Saarland =

- Founded: 1957
- Headquarters: Saarbrücken
- Employees: 60
- Website: Webseite

The Office for the Protection of the Constitution of Saarland is an intelligence service and the state authority for the protection of the constitution in Saarland, based in Saarbrücken. The 2018 budget allocated material resources for the Office for the Protection of the Constitution amounting to around 525,300 euros and the staffing plan totalled 60 positions. Until 2018, the Office for the Protection of the Constitution, founded in 1957, was an independent state authority before it was incorporated as Department V into the Saarland Ministry of the Interior, Building and Sport.

== Legal basis ==
The legal basis for the work of the Saarland State Office for the Protection of the Constitution is the Saarland Constitution Protection Act (SVerfSchG) in the version of 24 March 1993, last amended by the law of 26 October 2010 (Official Gazette I p. 1406)

== Control ==
"Due to the manageable size of the state and the structural conditions of the individual observation areas, no annual report on the protection of the constitution is published in Saarland"

However, since 2013, a situation report by the Office for the Protection of the Constitution has been published.

== Organisation ==
The department head is responsible for a staff unit (security affairs and counter-espionage) and four departments

- Section V1 (Policy and Legal Affairs)
- Section V2 (right-wing extremism, left-wing extremism, foreign extremism and terrorism)
- Section V3 (Islamism, Islamic terrorism)
- Section V4 (intelligence gathering)

== History ==
The authority began its work on the basis of the "Law on the Establishment of a State Office for the Protection of the Constitution" of July 8, 1957. Initially, it was organized as an independent state office. Ulrich Pohl has headed the State Office for the Protection of the Constitution since May 2021. On 18 April 2018, the Saarland State Parliament decided to incorporate the State Office into the Ministry of the Interior as Department V.

== Controversies ==
In 2006, it became known that the Saarland Office for the Protection of the Constitution was monitoring Oskar Lafontaine. Lafontaine was the SPD's candidate for chancellor in the 1990 federal election and has been a member of the Left since 2005. The Saarland Office for the Protection of the Constitution ended its surveillance of the Left Party in 2010 after the Left Party achieved a 19 percentage point increase in votes in the 2009 state elections.
