= Volker Weiss =

German historian (1972-)

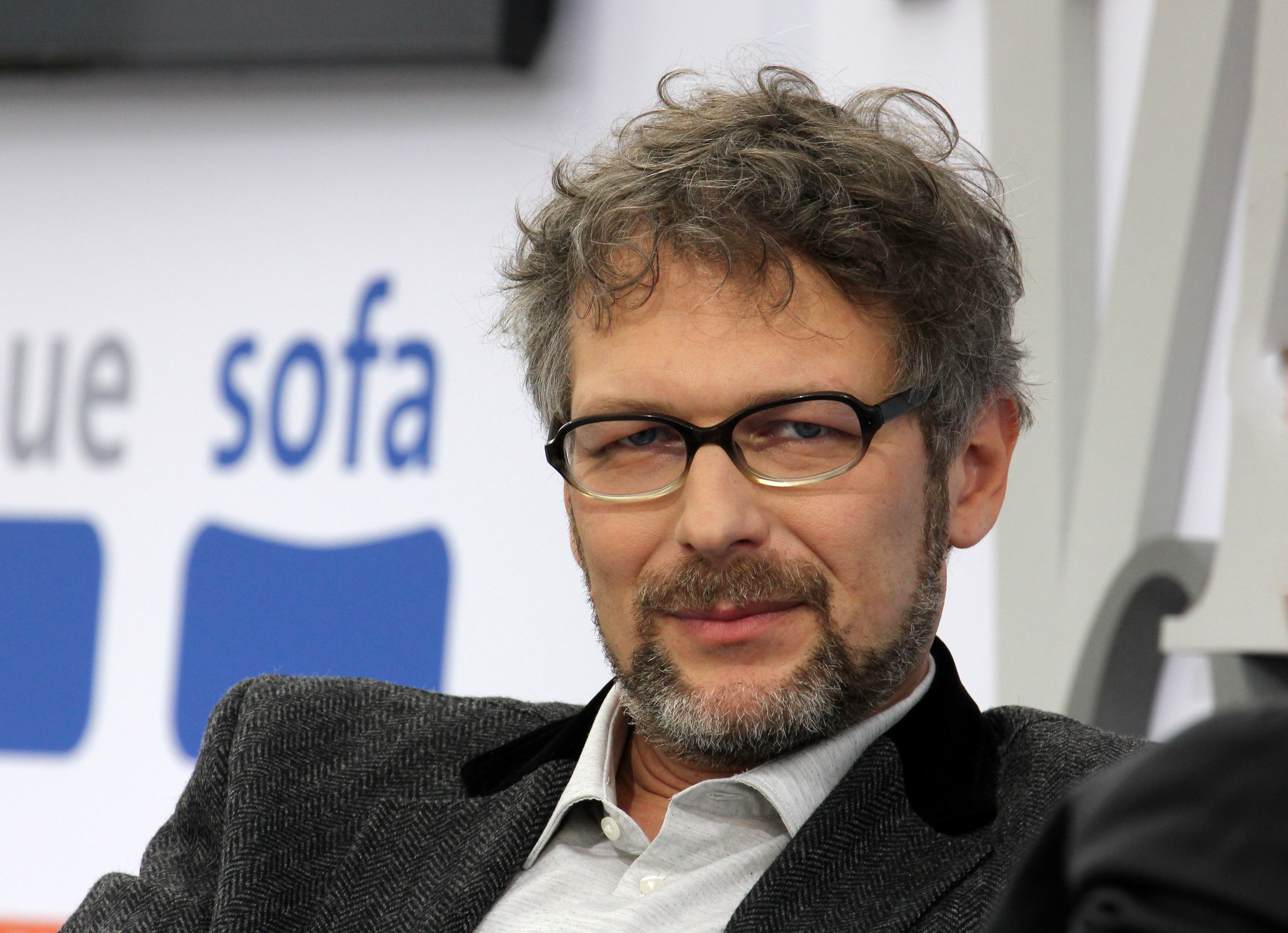
- Weiss at the Leipzig Book Fair in 2017
- Born: 1972 (age 53–54)
- Education: University of Hamburg; University of Leipzig; LMU Munich
- Occupations: Historian, journalist, writer
- Known for: Research on the extreme right and 19th and 20th century German history

Volker Weiss (born 1972) is a German historian, writer, and commentator on extreme right movements. His research focus is the extreme right and German history in the 19th and 20th century. Volker Weiss is a Fellow of the Center for Research on Antisemitism in Berlin.

== Biography ==
Volker Weiss studied literature studies, social and economical history as well as psychology at the University of Hamburg. In 2009, he finished his PhD in history with a study of Arthur Moeller van den Bruck, a major conservative intellectual in the late 19th and early 20th century that greatly influenced the Nazi Party.

Weiss has since taught at the University of Hamburg, Leipzig University and LMU Munich. In 2021, he was a guest professor at the University of Innsbruck.

As a journalist and writer, Weiss has published articles in a variety of media outlets, including Süddeutsche Zeitung, Der Spiegel and Die Zeit. He has written regularly for the Berlin weekly newspaper Jungle World since 2003, primarily on the extreme right in Germany. His 2017 book Die autoritäre Revolte. Die Neue Rechte und der Untergang des Abendlandes (the authoritarian revolt. The New Right and the Downfall of the West) was nominated for the Leipzig Book Fair Prize, and made his work known to a wider audience. He has also published a commentary on Theodor W. Adorno's work Aspects of the New Right-Wing Extremism, which was translated into English and Polish. He is considered a journalistic expert on the extreme right in Germany.

== Publications ==
- Deutschlands Neue Rechte. Angriff der Eliten – Von Spengler bis Sarrazin. Ferdinand Schöningh, Paderborn 2011, ISBN 978-3-506-77111-7
- Claudia Globisch, Agnieszka Pufelska, Volker Weiß (Hrsg.): Die Dynamik der europäischen Rechten. Geschichte, Kontinuitäten und Wandel. Springer VS, Wiesbaden 2011, ISBN 978-3-531-92703-9
- Moderne Antimoderne. Arthur Moeller van den Bruck und der Wandel des Konservatismus. Ferdinand Schöningh, Paderborn u. a. 2012, ISBN 978-3-506-77146-9 (Dissertation Universität Hamburg [2012], 548 Seiten mit Illustrationen).
- Moses Hess. Rheinischer Jude, Revolutionär, früher Zionist. Greven, Köln 2015, ISBN 978-3-7743-0614-1
- Revolution und „Völkerfrühling“: Moses Hess. In: Samuel Salzborn (Hrsg.): Zionismus. Theorien des jüdischen Staates (= Staatsverständnisse Bd. 76), Nomos, Baden-Baden 2015, ISBN 978-3-8487-1699-9, S. 15–33.
- PEGIDA – „Patriotische Europäer gegen die Islamisierung des Abendlandes“, Bundeszentrale für politische Bildung, 6. Januar 2015.
- Bedeutung und Wandel von ‚Kultur‘ für die extreme Rechte. In: Fabian Virchow, Martin Langebach, Alexander Häusler (Hrsg.): Handbuch Rechtsextremismus. Springer, Wiesbaden 2016, ISBN 978-3-531-19085-3, S. 441–469.
- Die autoritäre Revolte. Die Neue Rechte und der Untergang des Abendlandes. Klett-Cotta, Stuttgart 2017, ISBN 978-3-608-94907-0
- „Furor Teutonicus“, Jüdische Allgemeine, 6. Juli 2017.
- Vom Extrem zur Alternative? Ein Blick auf die rechtsextreme US-Szene, Bundeszentrale für politische Bildung, 28. Juli 2017.
- „Die Neue Front“. Die „revolutionäre“ Neuausrichtung des Nationalismus nach 1918. In: Journal für Politische Bildung 1/2018, Wochenschau Verlag, Frankfurt am Main, ISBN 978-3-7344-0662-1, S. 26–30.
- Rolf Peter Sieferles „Finis Germania“. Der Antaios Verlag und der Antisemitismus. In: Stefanie Schüler-Springorum (Hrsg.): Jahrbuch für Antisemitismusforschung 28, Metropol, Berlin 2019, ISBN 978-3-86331-502-3, S. 123–146.
- Nachwort zu: Theodor W. Adorno: Aspekte des neuen Rechtsradikalismus. Ein Vortrag. Suhrkamp, Berlin 2019, ISBN 978-3-518-58737-9, S. 59–87.
- Gemeinsam gegen den „Great Reset“. Synergien zwischen Neuer Rechter und Corona-Protesten, in: Wolfgang Benz (Hrsg.), Querdenken. Protestbewegung zwischen Demokratieverachtung, Hass und Aufruhr. Metropol, Berlin 2021, ISBN 978-3-86331-621-1, S. 214–229.
- Vom elitären Zirkel zur Massenbewegung? Die „Neue Rechte“ in Pandemiezeiten, in: Heike Kleffner / Matthias Meisner (Hrsg.), #Fehlender Mindestabstand. Die Corona-Krise und die Netzwerke der Demokratiefeinde. Herder, Freiburg i. B. 2021, ISBN 978-3-451-39037-1, S. 158–166.
- Autoritäre Kulturidentitäten. Zum Verständnis der Neuen Rechten in der Tradition Oswald Spenglers, in: Wilhelm Heitmeyer / Günter Frankenberg (Hrsg.), Treiber des Autoritären. Pfade von Entwicklungen im frühen 21. Jahrhundert. Campus, Frankfurt a. M. 2022, ISBN 978-3-593-51607-3, S. 321–344.
