= Medical-psychological assessment (Germany) =

Examination to assess fitness to drive

In Germany, a medical-psychological assessment (German: Medizinisch-Psychologische Untersuchung, or "MPU") is used by the authorities in deciding whether to revoke or reissue a driving license. Medical-psychological assessment has been shown to be highly effective at reducing the recidivism rate for drunk drivers. Drivers who are identified as potentially unfit may have their driver's license suspended and must satisfactorily complete an MPU to get their license reinstated. MPUs are commonly required due to drug- and alcohol-related offenses, or any other offenses that demonstrate a potential lack of maturity and judgment to safely participate in traffic.

The MPU is colloquially referred to as the "Idiot test" (German: Idiotentest), while the law refers to it as an "Assessment of Fitness to Drive" (German: Begutachtung der Fahreignung).

First German driving school in 1906, Aschaffenburg

== History ==
The first standards mandating the MPU for certain prospective drivers were legally adopted in 1955. Its stated purpose was to improve traffic safety and reduce the number of accidents by identifying unfit dangerous drivers and removing them from traffic until fitness to drive was restored.

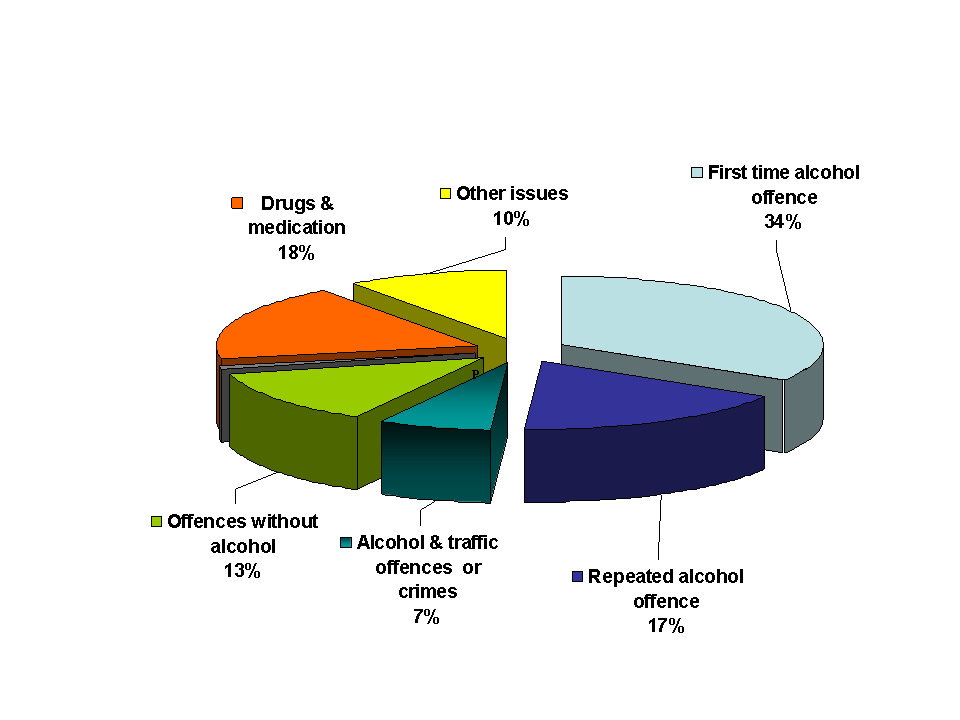

The MPU has an interdisciplinary basic approach. Although it is a punishment, it offers the offender the chance to rehabilitate themselves. German medical-psychological institutes perform about 100,000 MPUs a year. Many of their clients have to take the MPU twice because more than 50% fail to get a positive opinion on their first try.

A judge in a criminal case will not impose the requirement to take an MPU. Instead, this decision is made by the state prosecutor. The application of this requirement is inconsistent; some state prosecutors enforce it while others do not. Given this variability and the nature of the MPU, it should be considered an extrajudicial punishment.

== Drunk drivers ==
Alcohol offenders can only successfully complete an MPU after demonstrably reducing their alcohol consumption. The change in drinking behaviour must be stabilised and motivationally consolidated. Passing the MPU is not easy: drivers arrested with a blood alcohol level of 0.16% or more may in some instances be required to establish that they have been completely abstinent for at least one year; test administrators corroborate drivers' formal statements as to their abstinence by measuring their liver function levels and conducting random urine screenings.

== Other causes ==
A conviction for driving while impaired is not the only scenario in which the MPU can be required. Drivers who fail a drug test, even without operating a vehicle under the influence, can be required to obtain a favorable MPU opinion by a certain deadline (usually several weeks after an incident) or face suspension of their driver's licenses. This justification for requiring an MPU opinion enables the government to suspend the licenses of many alcoholics who were not apprehended while driving drunk. Bicyclists participating in traffic with a blood alcohol level of 0.16% or greater can also be required to undergo an MPU.

Also, in addition to justification, an MPU (which is much more often passed than alcohol-related MPUs) is necessary if someone wants a dispensation from the minimum driving age.

MPUs have also been required for offenders who have committed repeated traffic offenses that demonstrate a lack of respect for the law, such as a driver who collected 17 speeding tickets and 127 parking violations in one-and-a-half years.

Due to the nature of German law, committing a crime as minor as causing someone offense, such as giving someone the finger, can be considered an act of violence as they allegedly indicate a particularly high level of aggression or low impulse control. Consequently, the state prosecutor can impose the requirement to take an MPU in such cases as well.

== Measures ==
If possible, the MPU gives a clear recommendation to the offender to attend a specific course to re-establish his or her fitness to drive. These courses are well adapted to the specific problems of the offenders: Alcohol, drugs, or other traffic safety violations.

== Bypassing the MPU ==
In the past, many applicants circumvented the MPU by obtaining a driving license in another European country (a practice known as driving license tourism). However, this changed significantly with the introduction of a new regulation on January 19, 2009, which created more legal certainty and equality. As a result, the number of advertisements for EU driving licenses had decreased.

Given the still controversial legal situation, potential subsequent bans on use, and many fraudulent offers with "guarantees of success," it was advisable to seek information in advance from legal professionals, especially those specializing in traffic law.

Until 2012, drivers found with an EU driving license in Germany were prohibited from continuing their journey if they still had outstanding driving license requirements in Germany.

This changed on April 26, 2012, when the European Court of Justice ruled that an EU driving license must be recognized in Germany, even if the person still has an MPU requirement or other requirements in Germany, provided the suspension period has expired and the person has their normal place of residence in the issuing EU member state. This ruling effectively bypasses the MPU requirement and enforceability entirely. Notably, under EU law, it is possible to have a "normal place of residence" in multiple EU member states, even with minimal presence, such as owning a summer cottage in France and visiting it only once a year. This EU law supersedes German residency regulations.

== Other countries ==
In Russia, all professional drivers must pass a similar test at 2-year intervals.
