= State Office for the Protection of the Constitution of Baden-Württemberg =

Domestic intelligence agency in Germany

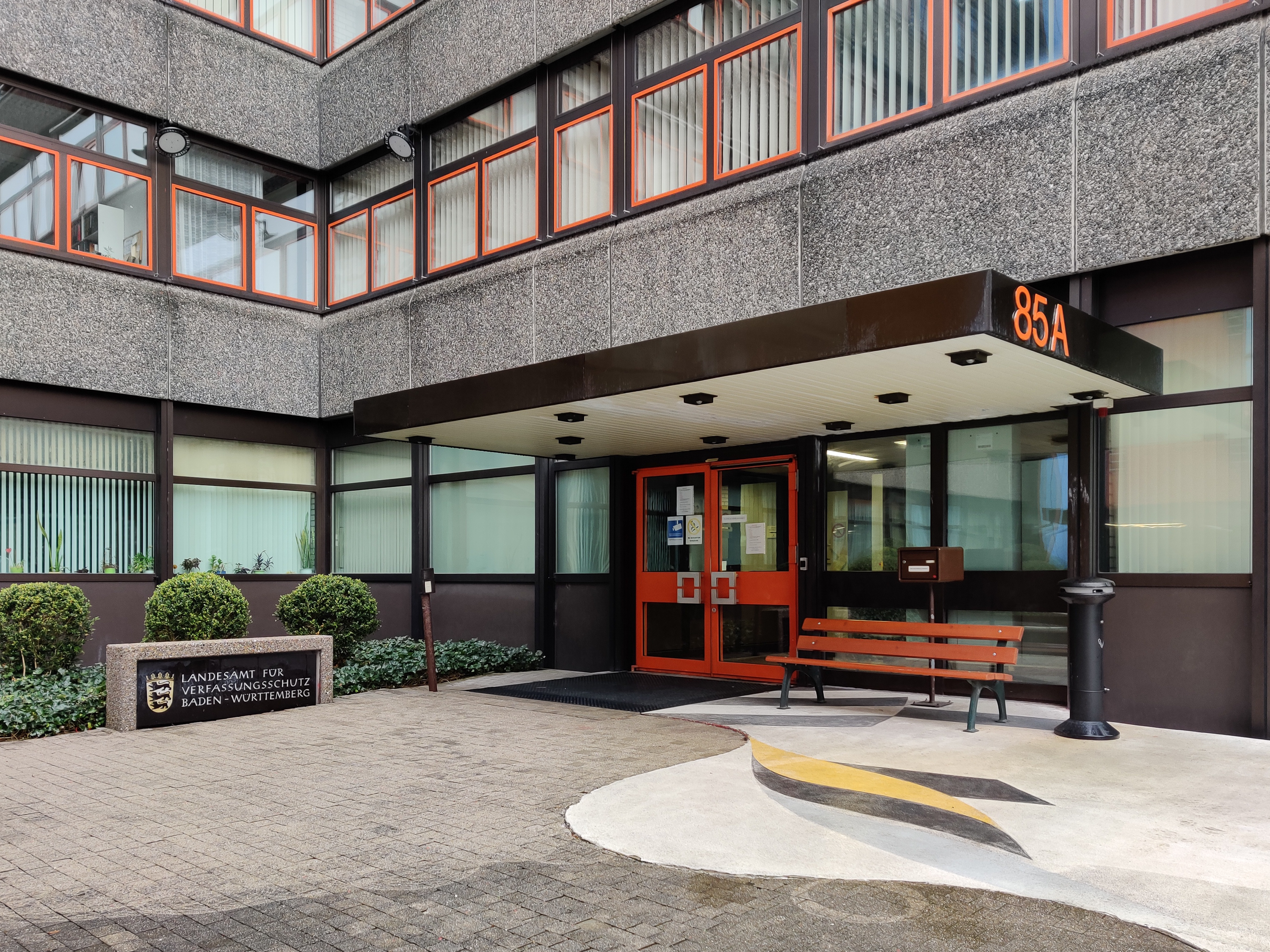
- Main entrance of the State Office
- Headquarters: Stuttgart
- Employees: 404 (Stand: 2020)
- Website: Website des Landesamtes

The State Office for the Protection of the Constitution of Baden-Württemberg is the state authority for the protection of the constitution in the German federal state of Baden-Württemberg. The state office monitors right-wing and left-wing extremism, foreign extremism and religious fundamentalists. Its tasks also include counter-espionage and monitoring the Scientology Organization (SO). Its headquarters are in Stuttgart-Bad Cannstatt. Beate Bube has been president of the State Office for the Protection of the Constitution since January 1, 2008.

== History ==
After the Basic Law came into force in 1949, the states set up special authorities or offices to protect the constitution. In what later became Baden-Württemberg, these were the states of Württemberg-Baden, Baden and Württemberg-Hohenzollern. In 1951, the Württemberg-Hohenzollern State Office for the Protection of the Constitution was founded in Tübingen. This was followed by the information office of the Baden State Chancellery in Freiburg and the Württemberg-Baden State Office for the Protection of the Constitution in Stuttgart. After the founding of Baden-Württemberg, these authorities merged in December 1952 to form what is now the Baden-Württemberg State Office for the Protection of the Constitution.

== Outline ==
The LfV is divided into six departments and a management staff with press and public relations:

- Department 1 – Central Department
- Department 2 – Islamic extremism und terrorism
- Department 3 – right extremism and -terrorism, Reichsbürger movement and Selbstverwalter
- Department 4 – counter-espionage, secrecy and sabotage protection, co-operation duties, Scientology organization
- Department 5 – Covert operation department
- Department 6 – Left-wing extremism und foreign extremism and terrorism

== Legal basis ==
The legal basis for the work of the State Office for the Protection of the Constitution of Baden-Württemberg is the Law on the Protection of the Constitution in Baden-Württemberg (LVSG – State Constitutional Protection Law – Baden-Württemberg) in the version of 5 December 2005.

== Control ==
The LfV is subject to technical and administrative supervision by the Ministry of the Interior of Baden-Württemberg. Parliamentary monitoring is carried out by the Minister of the Interior informing the standing committee of the state parliament every six months and by the so-called G 10 Commission (Section 15 LVSG).

== President ==
Period	Name	Notes
1951–1962	Hans-Heinrich Picht	
1962–1973	Peter Lahnstein	
1973–1986	Dieter Wagner	From 1986 to 1989 President of the Berlin Office for the Protection of the Constitution; He initiated the installation of listening microphones on the Red Army Faction prisoners inhaftierten Mitgliedern der Stammheim Prison.
1986–1988	Ralf Krüger	
1988–1995	Eduard Vermander	From 1 August 1995 to 1 July 2000 President of the thenBerlin Office for the Protection of the Constitution
1995–2005	Helmut Rannacher (CDU)	
2005–2007	Johannes Schmalzl (FDP)	From January 2008 to May 2016, President of the Stuttgart administrative district.
since 2008	Beate Bube (non-partisan)	

== Criticism ==
In 1979, the LfV deprived the Heidelberg librarian Walter Felzmann of his job. He used a camera to document a scuffle between police officers and civilians, whereupon the police officers pursued Felzmann, confiscated his footage and reported him. In July 1978, Felzmann received a penal order for resisting the law enforcement officers on the grounds that he had photographed the police officers "in disregard of the right to one's own image" while they were clearing away an unauthorized information stand of the Communist League of West Germany (KBW), and that he had resisted the confiscation of the film. He lodged an appeal and was acquitted. Felzmann was later placed by the employment office with the library of the University of Heidelberg and was selected from among seven applicants. He was offered the job in mid-1979, but then nothing more came for a long time and then an interim notice that the recruitment process had "unfortunately been delayed". In June 1979, Felzmann made a regular query to the LfV because the university position would have meant a public-law position. This note from the Office for the Protection of the Constitution stated: "On December 11, 1976, Mr. Felzmann was in charge of an unauthorized information stand of the KBW in Heidelberg. When the information stand was dismantled, he resisted. [...]" The university's human resources department subsequently commented: "These incidents were the reason for hiring another applicant assigned by the employment office." Felzmann's Heidelberg lawyer Wolfgang Stather wanted compensation from the university for "culpable non-hiring" of his client and said: "It is incomprehensible how state authorities could spread such false information without even hearing the person concerned." It was not until July 30, 1980, that the university's human resources department thanked them for the acquittal sent in June 1979. After another three months, the Stuttgart Interior Ministry admitted the blunder and promised that the findings about Felzmann would be “withdrawn” because they could in fact “not be maintained”.

As part of the first Bundestag National Socialist Underground investigation committee, statements by an undercover agent from the Office for the Protection of the Constitution with the code name "Krokus" were made public. She stated that in May 2007 she had passed on information to the Office for the Protection of the Constitution about right-wing extremists who were allegedly trying to find out through a nurse whether a seriously injured colleague of Kiesewetter remembered details of the murder after his coma. However, the undercover agent leader with the code name Oettinger had asked her to stay out of the matter. The undercover agent stated that she had already been reporting regularly to Oettinger at this point. He denies this on the basis of the files, according to which the undercover agent was only officially listed as a source from June/July 2007.
