= Federal Motor Transport Authority =

German federal agency

- Kraftfahrt-Bundesamt

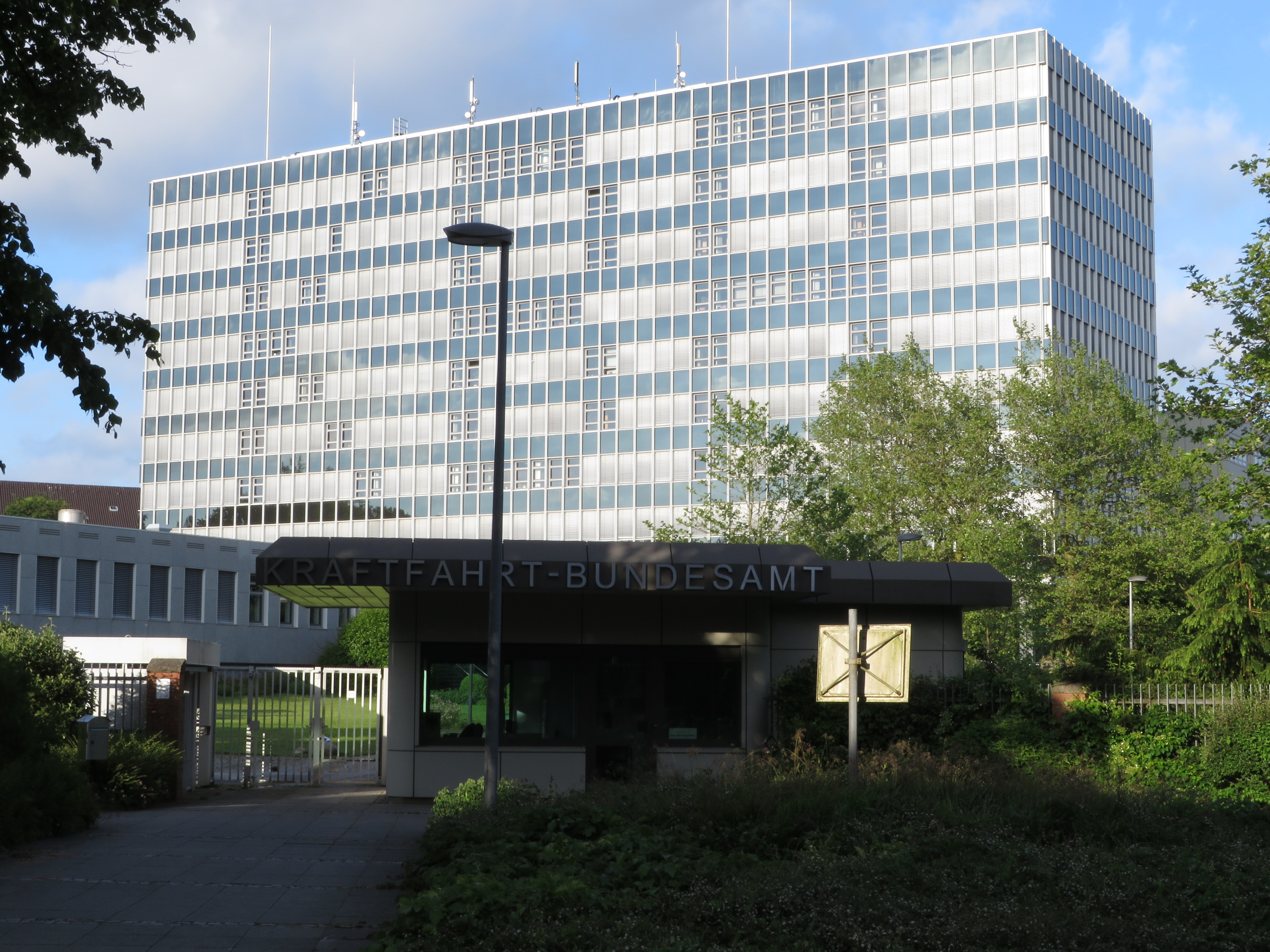
- Headquarters in Flensburg

Federal agency overview
- Formed: 4 August 1951
- Jurisdiction: Government of Germany
- Headquarters: Flensburg, Schleswig-Holstein
- Employees: 859
- Annual budget: €99.244 million (2024)
- Federal agency executive: Richard Damm, President
- Parent department: Federal Ministry for Digital and Transport
- Website: Official website

The Federal Motor Transport Authority (German: Kraftfahrt-Bundesamt (KBA)) is a German federal agency for road traffic which is subordinate to the Federal Ministry for Digital and Transport. It has its headquarters in Flensburg with additional seats in Dresden, Harrislee and Leck.

== Organization ==
The agency has five departments:

- the office of interdepartmental functions,
- the department of central services,
- the department of central registers, which manages the five central registers,
- the department of statistics, which manages vehicle statistics, driver statistics, road traffic statistics, scientific support studies and the research data center,
- the department of Type Approval and the
- department of market surveillance.

== Tasks ==
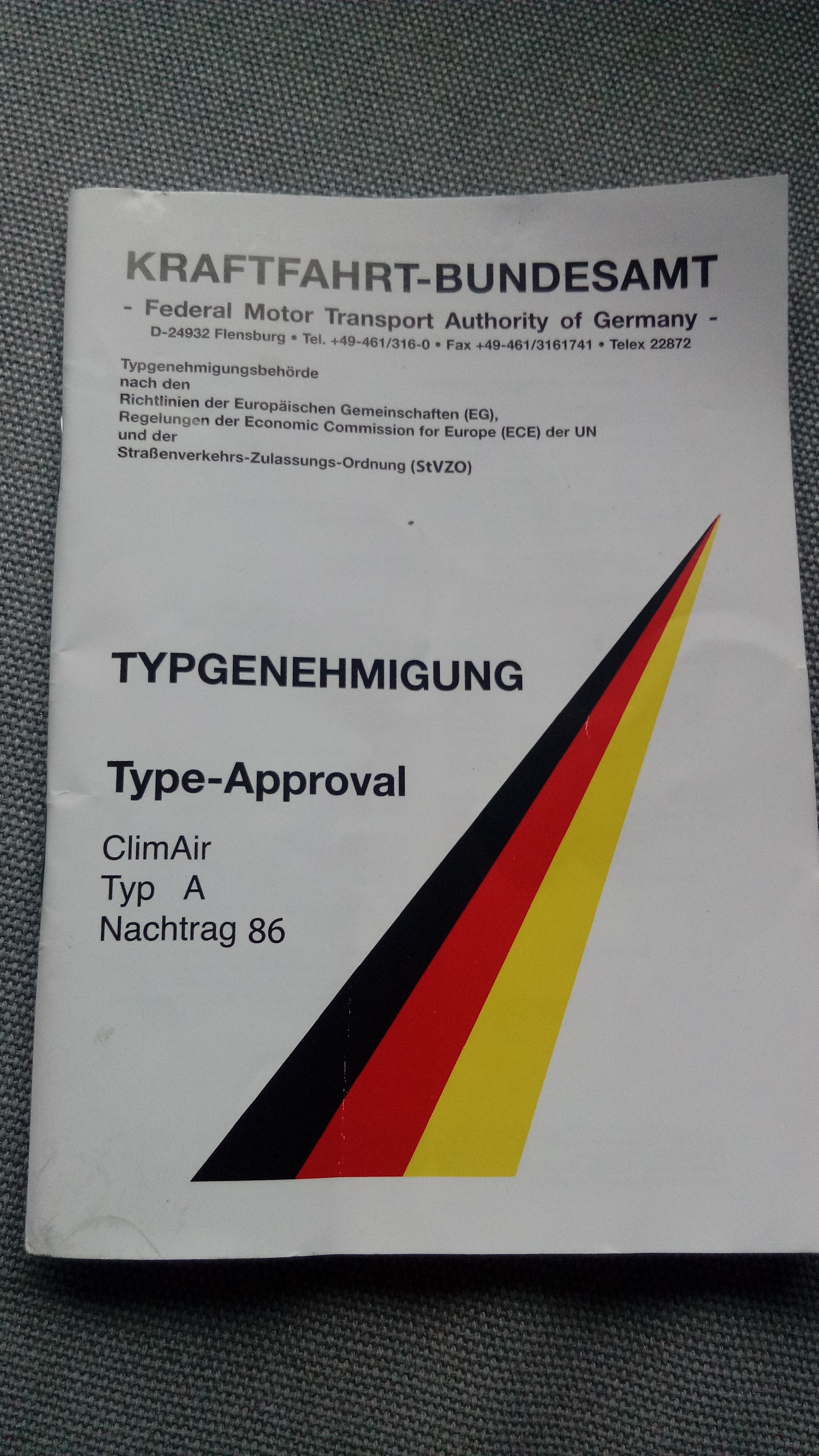
Type Approval of the agency

The tasks of the federal agency are laid down in § 2 of the Act on the Establishment of a Federal Motor Transport Authority (Gesetz über die Errichtung eines Kraftfahrt-Bundesamtes (KBAG)). For motor vehicles intended for road traffic, the agency is responsible for the Type Approval (Typgenehmigung) and Type Testing (Typprüfung) of vehicles and vehicle parts to confirm that the legal safety and environmental standards are fulfilled. In Addition the agency's task is the recognition of technical services that test vehicles or vehicle parts as part of the approval procedure and the market surveillance of vehicles and vehicle trailers placed on the market.

The agency also maintains five registers and provides information on entries in them:

- the Register of Driver Fitness (Fahreignungsregister) pursuant to Section IV of the Road Traffic Act (Straßenverkehrsgesetz), which is based on a very well-known and special point system,
- the Central Vehicle Register (Zentrales Fahrzeugregister) pursuant to Section V of the Road Traffic Act,
- the Central Register of Driving Licences (Zentrales Fahrerlaubnisregister) pursuant to Section VI of the Road Traffic Act,
- the Register of Tachograph Cards (Zentrales Fahrtenschreiberkartenregister) pursuant to the legal regulation on § 2 of the Driving Personnel Act (Fahrpersonalverordnung) and the
- Infrastructure Levy Register (Infrastrukturabgaberegister) according to § 6 of the Infrastructure Levy Act (Infrastrukturabgabengesetz).

As part of the Prüm Convention, the agency enables police and law enforcement authorities of other contracting states to directly access the Central Vehicle Register.

== History ==
The Federal Motor Transport Authority was established by the Act on the Establishment of a Federal Motor Transport Authority of August 4, 1951. It is the successor to three independent predecessor agencies

- The collection point for information about drivers of motor vehicles (Sammelstelle für Nachrichten über Führer von Kraftfahrzeugen) was set up at the Berlin police headquarters in 1910, which recorded revocations and refusal of driving licenses.
- The collection point for information about motor vehicles (Sammelstelle für Nachrichten über Kraftfahrzeuge) was set up in Berlin police headquarters in 1934. It recorded all registered motor vehicles.
- Lastly, the Imperial Office for Type Testing of Motor Vehicles and Motor Vehicle Parts (Reichsstelle für Typprüfung von Kraftfahrzeugen und Kraftfahrzeugteilen) was established in Berlin in 1937.

On October 10, 1990, the area of responsibility was expanded to the territory of the former German Democratic Republic. The Motor Vehicle Technical Office (Kraftfahrzeugtechnisches Amt) in Dresden becomes a branch of the agency.

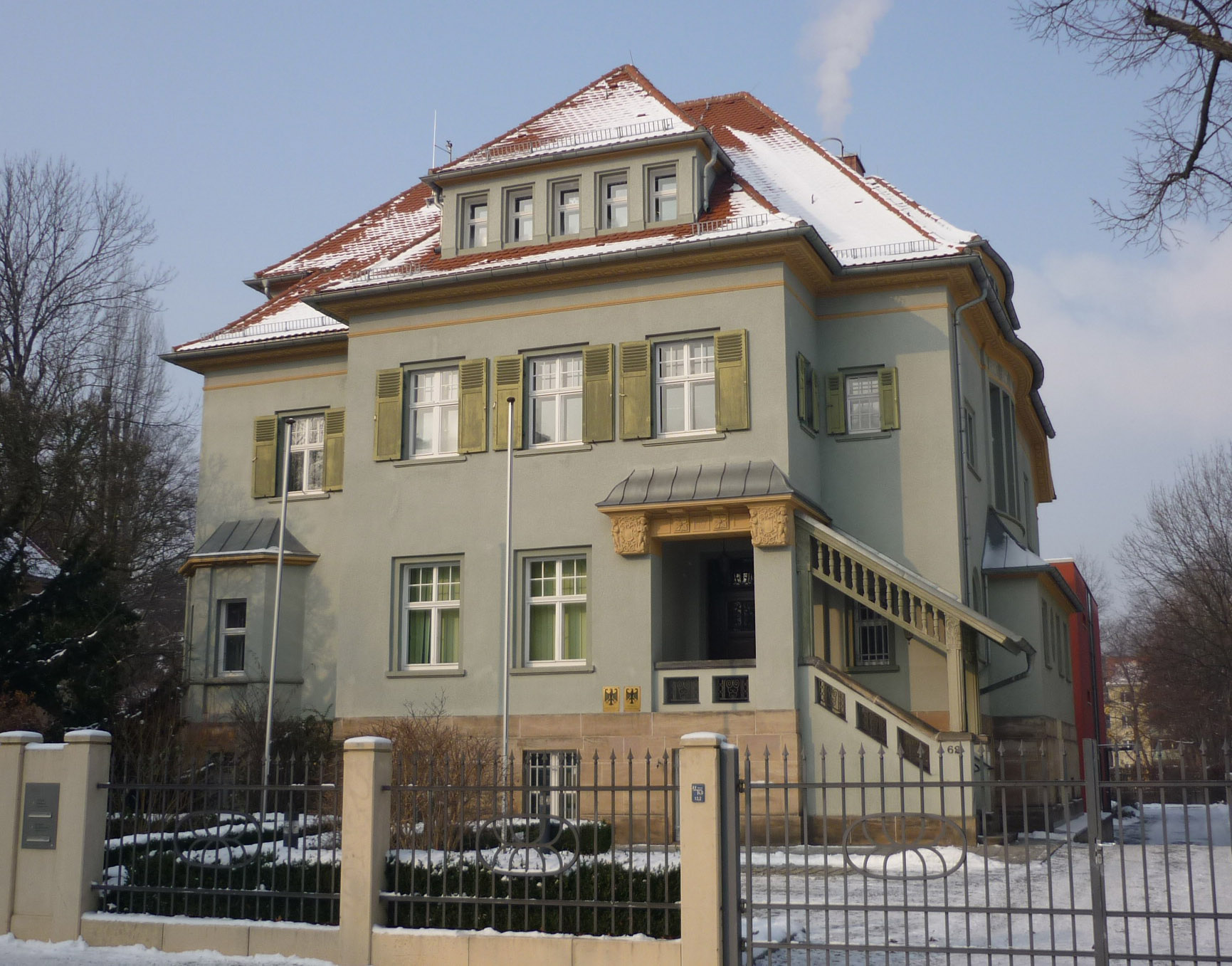
The agency's headquarters in Dresden
