= Liberal democratic basic order =

Term in German constitutional law

The liberal democratic basic order (German: freiheitliche demokratische Grundordnung, informal abbreviation fdGO or FDGO) is a fundamental term in German constitutional law. It determines the unalienable, invariable core structure of the German commonwealth. As such, it is the core substance of the German constitution. Building upon more general definitions of liberal democracy, the term has a specific legal meaning in Germany and is part of the German (originally West German) system of a Streitbare Demokratie ("fortified democracy") that bans attempts to dismantle the liberal democratic basic order by what German authorities refer to as "enemies of the Constitution" or "extremists".

In practice, the concept has been used to target various far-right, far-left and other extremist groups. A historical example is the ideological struggle against Soviet-controlled East Germany ("GDR") during the Cold War, when West Germany's commitment to defending democracy was closely linked with its opposition to Soviet and East German authoritarian communism. Ever since the German reunification, the concept has been used to counter the resurgence of far-right extremism.

Theoretically the concept is associated with anti-totalitarianism and with the scholarly field of democracy and extremism research in Germany. While often relying upon scholars in this field, the classification of extremist organisations is ultimately an administrative decision made by the Federal Office ("BfV") or State Offices for the Protection of the Constitution ("LfV"). Associations that threaten the liberal democratic basic order may be banned by the minister of the interior at federal or state level (decision subject to review by administrative courts). Anti-constitutional political parties may only be dissolved by the Federal Constitutional Court.

== Definition ==
The FDGO touches on the political order and the societal and political values on which German liberal democracy rests. According to the Federal Constitutional Court, the free democratic order is defined thus:

The free (Note: The German original says "freiheitlich", not "frei". See also liberalism and freiheitlich.) democratic basic order can be defined as an order which excludes any form of tyranny or arbitrariness and represents a governmental system under a rule of law, based upon self-determination of the people as expressed by the will of the existing majority and upon freedom and equality. The fundamental principles of this order include at least: respect for the human rights given concrete form in the Basic Law, in particular for the right of a person to life and free development; popular sovereignty; separation of powers; responsibility of government; lawfulness of administration; independence of the judiciary; the multi-party principle; and equality of opportunities for all political parties.

— Federal Constitutional Court, Judgment of 23 October 1952 – 1 BvB 1/51

People and groups that threaten the liberal democratic basic order are referred to as "enemies of the Constitution" or "extremist" in German government and legal language. Parties as well as groups can be banned if they strive to abolish the FDGO. The willingness of a liberal democracy to ban parties that endanger liberal democracy itself has been termed "militant democracy", or "wehrhafte Demokratie" in German. While conceptually largely similar to broader definitions of liberal democracy, the liberal democratic basic order is distinguished by the measures that are allowed against "extreme" ideologies and groups to defend the order, such as the possibility to ban or officially monitor extremist groups.

=== Opposition by political extremists ===
According to the 2016 report of the federal office for constitutional protection, opposition to the order stems from both the far-right and far-left extremist spectrum. Far-left formations rally around anti-capitalism, anti-militarism, anti-racism and anti-fascism (Antifa) as far-left extremist activist fields, which are not compatible with and opposed to the FDGO. Far-right extremist groups also reject the democratic-constitutional state, rallying around the fields of the racist great replacement and other conspiracy ideologies, defamation of the press, islamophobia and anti-immigrant sentiment.

== History ==
The liberal democratic basic order has been a core concept in the constitutional law of the Federal Republic of Germany, originally West Germany, since 1949, and it played a significant role in the West German government's efforts to counteract communism during the Cold War.

=== Cold War ===
The concept is closely linked to the anti-communist policies in the Federal Republic of Germany (West Germany) during the Cold War. In the early years of the republic, the extremist and anti-constitutional parties "Communist Party of Germany" (1956) and the "Socialist Reich Party" (1952) have been successfully banned. Instituted in 1972, the Anti-Radical Decree aimed at diminishing the influence of far-left radicalism. The German Restitution Laws also contained a "communist exception" that specifically determined that "enemies of the liberal democratic basic order", in practice communists, were not entitled to compensation for earlier Nazi persecution. Communist groups have been extensively monitored by the Federal Office for the Protection of the Constitution and the state offices for the protection of the constitution under the umbrella term of "far-left extremism"; during the Cold War the Federal Agency for Civic Education also focused in large part on Communists as enemies of the liberal democratic basic order, and the struggle against communism was framed by West German authorities primarily in terms of civic education and anti-extremism.

=== United Germany ===
With the fall of the Iron Curtain and the reunification of Germany, the federal republic had to deal with a changing extremist scene, and a revival of far-right extremism, especially in the newly acceded eastern German states. In 2003, as well as in 2017, attempts to ban the National Democratic Party of Germany (NPD) failed. In 2003, the Federal Constitutional Court rejected the ban, as a blocking minority of judges accused the party of being too closely tied to the state - too many undercover informants by the BfV had positions in the party, according to them. In the second attempt in 2017, the court rejected the plea due to "missing potential" by the NPD to overthrow the government, yet saying that the party wants to remove the FDGO, and that it is not compatible with the constitutional principles of democracy. The party has since then rebranded to "Die Heimat" ("The Homeland").

In 2025, the far-right extremist AfD party celebrated major election victories in several eastern German state elections. Numerous scandals occurred around this time, such as blocking and undermining institutional procedures in state parliaments with a blocking minority, leaks about racist plans for large-scale deportation of non-ethnic Germans to enforce ethnical homogeneity ("Remigration"), revelation of close and friendly ties of the AfD leadership to the Russian authorities as well as to Chinese intelligence and the first occurrence of the AfD, a far-right extremist party, deciding a marginal vote in the German parliament. As a result of these controversies, 124 MPs of various parties submitted a motion to discuss a ban on the AfD in the Bundestag, backed up by calls from numerous lawyers, judges and a prosecutor. During the debate, the petition ultimately did not bring the needed majority, yet voices in politics and in civil society remained vocal, as the AfD continues to be popular in election polling for the 2025 federal election. A 2021 AfD report by the BfV was leaked by netzpolitik.org in 2025. According to the leak, the office considered the AfD to pursue efforts against the FDGO and human dignity, and recommended to monitor it.

== See also ==
- Basic structure doctrine
