= Terrorism in Germany =

Use of violence to achieve aims in Germany

Terrorism in Germany has occurred in several distinct periods, most notably during the Weimar Republic and the Cold War. Acts of political violence have been carried out by far-left and far-right German groups, as well as by foreign organisations operating on German territory. These episodes have included assassinations, bombings, kidnappings, and other forms of politically motivated violence, and have had varying impacts on German politics, society, and security policy.

In the 21st century, Germany has faced renewed far-left, far-right, and Islamist extremist activity. Several attacks and plots linked to jihadist networks have occurred, including the 2016 Berlin Christmas market attack and the 2024 Solingen stabbing, prompting expanded security measures and counter‑terrorism efforts.

Contemporary threats include internationally connected jihadist networks, far‑right groups, and far‑left militants, with authorities regularly disrupting planned attacks and monitoring radicalisation within the country.

== Response to terrorism ==
The terrorism of the 1970s significantly shaped Germany's political culture and reinforced its policy of refusing to negotiate with terrorist groups. It also led to the creation of GSG 9 in 1972, shortly after the Munich Olympics massacre, a federal counter‑terrorism and police special‑operations unit established within the then‑Bundesgrenzschutz (Federal Border Guard), which was renamed Bundespolizei in 2005. GSG 9 became one of the earliest dedicated counter‑terrorism units and served as a model for similar police special‑operations forces worldwide. That same year, the Radikalenerlass ('Radicals Decree') was introduced, which restricted individuals considered 'radical' or politically unreliable from holding public‑sector jobs.

In addition to organisational and administrative measures, the federal government also expanded criminal law to address terrorism. Forming, joining, or supporting terrorist organisations became a specific criminal offence under § 129a of the German Strafgesetzbuch (Criminal Code). The provision was introduced by the Act of 18 August 1976 as part of a broader package of counter‑terrorism legislation, which also established "terrorist organisation" as a defined legal category. These measures are sometimes collectively referred to as the "Lex RAF", reflecting their particular relevance to the activities of the Red Army Faction (RAF).

Traditionally, counter‑terrorism agencies in Germany have responded more quickly to extreme left‑wing groups than to extreme right‑wing ones. One explanation offered by researchers is that right‑wing extremists were often viewed as "corrigible", pursuing concrete and negotiable goals, whereas left‑wing extremists were regarded as "incorrigible", driven by ideological aims seen as non‑negotiable. Because left‑wing groups were perceived as challenging the foundations of the political system, they attracted a stronger state response, while right‑wing violence was sometimes treated as less politically threatening. In addition, far‑right attacks were at times not recognised as terrorism by security services, as they were not accompanied by explicit political statements or claims of responsibility. For example, the 1992 Mölln arson attack on a house occupied by Turkish immigrants was initially attributed to organised crime and only later identified as the work of extreme right‑wing perpetrators, leading officials to question whether it constituted terrorism at all.

In 2019, the Federal Criminal Police Office (BKA, Bundeskriminalamt) created a specialised department focused on Islamic terrorism and extremism.

== Weimar Republic (1919–1933) ==
The Weimar Republic (1919–1933) was Germany's first parliamentary democracy, established after the First World War. Germany's defeat created a period of political instability in which numerous far‑left and far‑right groups attempted to seize power. Both sides formed their own militias and carried out political assassinations. For example, Foreign Minister Walther Rathenau was assassinated in 1922 by a far‑right organisation, while members of the Communist Party of Germany killed police captains Paul Anlauf and Franz Lenck in Berlin in 1931.

== Terrorism in West Germany and reunified Germany ==
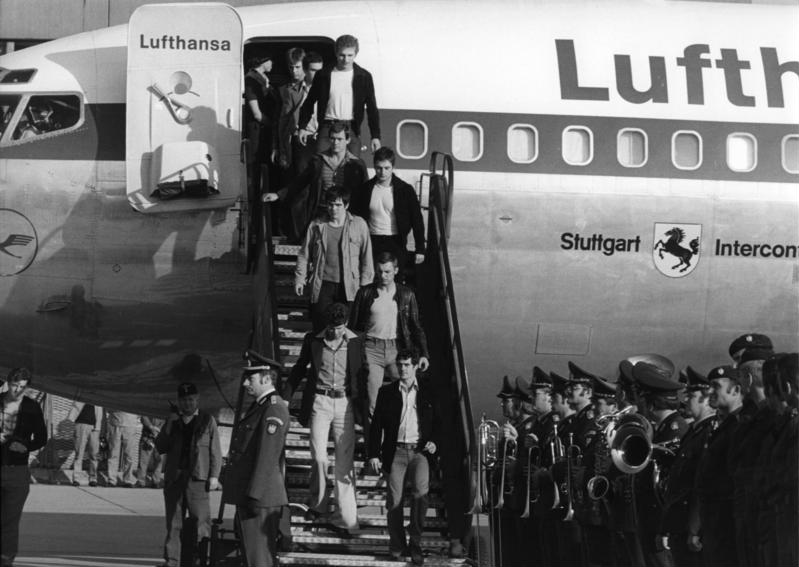
Operatives of GSG 9, Germany's counter‑terrorism unit, returning from Mogadishu in 1977 after rescuing the hostages of Lufthansa Flight 181

During the Cold War, particularly in the 1970s, West Germany experienced a wave of terrorism, most of it carried out by far‑left groups such as the Red Army Faction (RAF), and culminating in the German Autumn of 1977, one of the most serious national crises in the country's postwar history. Terrorist incidents continued into the 1980s and 1990s. Some of these groups also maintained links to international terrorism, notably Palestinian militant organisations, and some received support from the East German Ministry for State Security (Stasi) under Erich Mielke's leadership. In addition, both the Provisional Irish Republican Army (IRA) and the Irish National Liberation Army (INLA) carried out attacks against British military personnel based in West Germany, including the 1987 Rheindahlen bombing and the 1996 Osnabrück mortar attack, as part of their campaigns to target British forces stationed abroad. Other foreign militant groups also carried out attacks in West Germany and West Berlin, such as the 1986 La Belle discotheque bombing in West Berlin, in which Libyan‑backed operatives targeted a nightclub frequented by U.S. military personnel stationed in the city.

== Terrorism in 21st‑century Germany ==
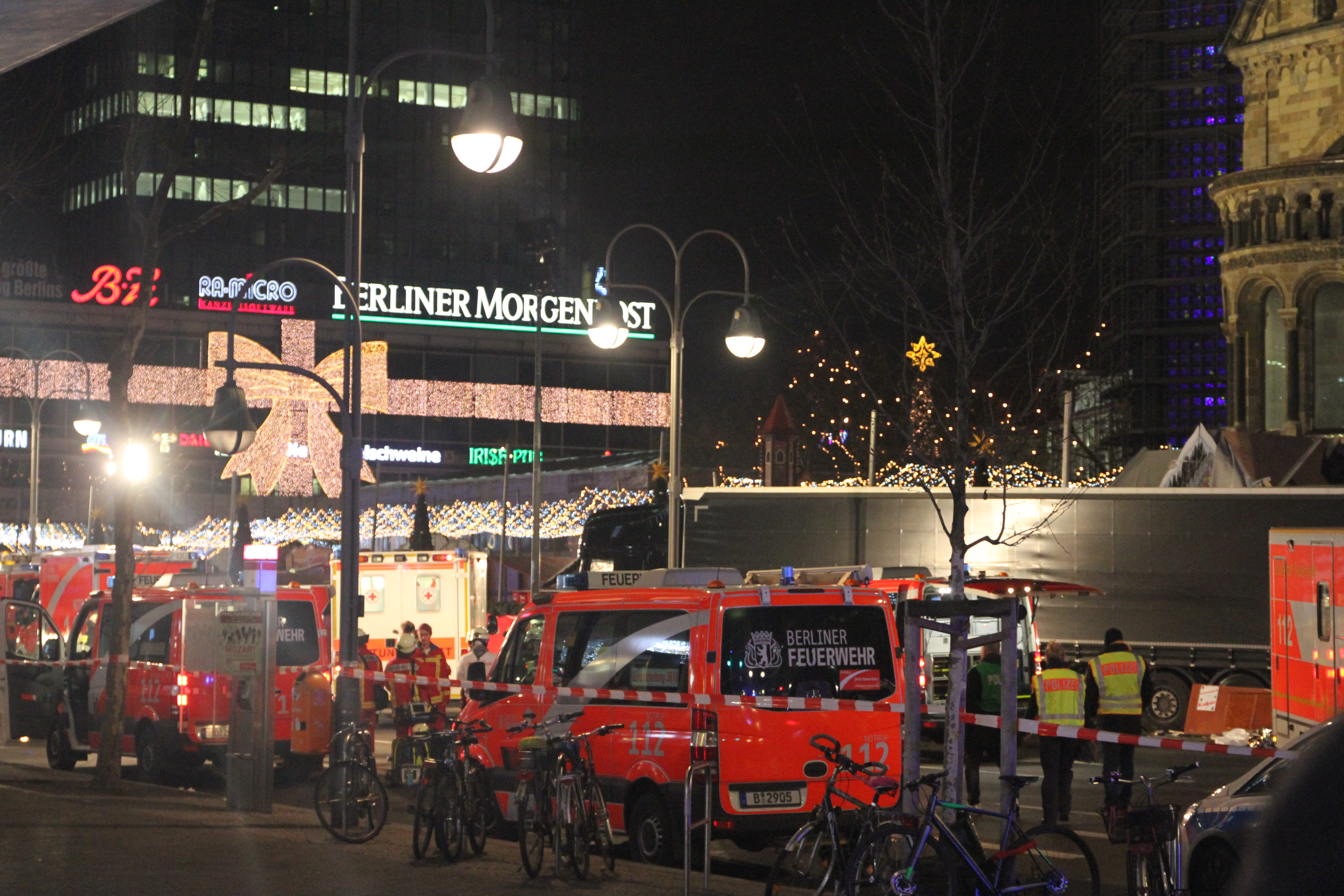
Aftermath of the 2016 Berlin truck attack

Turkish and Kurdish Islamist groups are also active in Germany. Political scientist Guido Steinberg stated that many top leaders of Islamist organizations in Turkey fled to Germany in the 2000s, and that the Kurdish Hezbollah has also "left an imprint on Turkish Kurds in Germany." Also many Kurds from Iraq (there are about 50,000 to 80,000 Iraqi Kurds in Germany) financially supported Kurdish-Islamist groups like Ansar al-Islam. Many Islamists in Germany are ethnic Kurds (Iraqi and Turkish Kurds) or Turks. Before 2006, the German Islamist scene was dominated by Iraqi Kurds and Palestinians, but since 2006 Kurds from Turkey and Turks are dominant.

In 2015, 11 verdicts concerning jihadist terrorism related offences were issued by German courts. In 2016, 28 verdicts for jihadist terrorism related offences were delivered. In 2017 there were 27 verdicts.

Almost all known terrorist networks and individuals in Germany have links to Salafism, an ultra-conservative Islamic ideology.

== Known terrorist groups in Germany (both active and in-active) ==
Known terrorist groups in Germany (both active and in-active)
Right wing extremists	Anarchists and left wing extremists	Islamists and Salafists	Separatists and foreign nationalists
Atomwaffen Division 2018-2024	Red Army Faction 1970–1998	Al-Qaeda since 2006	Provisional Irish Republican Army 1980–1989
Freikorps Havelland 2003–2005	Popular Front for the Liberation of Palestine	Islamic State since 2015	Black September 1972
Gruppe Freital 2015–2018	Revolutionary Cells 1973–1993	Ansar al-Islam	Grey Wolves since 1968
National Socialist Underground 1999–2011	Anti-Imperialist Cell 1992 – 1995		
Deutsche Aktionsgruppen 1980	Movement 2 June 1972–1980		
Wehrsportsgruppe Hoffman 1973–1980	Tupamaros West-Berlin (and Munchen) 1969–1970		
Combat 18 since 1992	Revolutionäre Aktionszellen (RAZ) 2009–2011		
Action Front of National Socialists/National Activists 1977–1983	Rote Zora 1974–1995		
Revolution Chemnitz 2018–2019	Militante gruppe 2001–2009		
Nationale Bewegung 2000–2001	Klasse gegen Klasse1992–2003		
Hepp-Kexel-Group 1982	Feministische Autonome Zelle (FAZ) since 2019		
	Palestine Action since 2020		

=== List of significant terrorist incidents in Germany ===
Germany
Date	Location	Deaths	Injuries	Type	Perpetrator or motives	Description
2 April 1968	Frankfurt	—	—	Arson	Red Army Faction	-- Shopping Mall Two founding fathers of the RAF, Andreas Baader and Gudrun Ensslin, set fire to a shopping mall in Frankfurt as a political statement against capitalism.
11 April 1968	Berlin	—	1	Small arms fire	Josef Bachmann	-- Rudi Dutschke, prominent figure of the left-wing students movement 23 year old worker Josef Bachmann tried to assassinate the prominent left-wing figure Rudi Dutschke by firing multiple shots at him. The victim was seriously wounded and scarred for life.
10 February 1970	Munich	1	23	Grenade attack and Small arms fire	PDFLP and AOLP (Palestinian nationalists)	-- Airports & airlines Three terrorists attacked El Al passengers in a bus at the Munich-Riem Airport with guns and grenades; one passenger was killed and 23 injured. All three terrorists were captured by airport police. The Popular Democratic Front for the Liberation of Palestine and the Action Organisation for the Liberation of Palestine claim responsibility for the attack. Main article: 1970 Munich bus attack
13 February 1970	Munich	7	10	Arson	Anarchist group (suspected)	-- Cultural institutions A Jewish cultural center was burned to the ground in Munich. Arab nationalist and German far-right organisations were initially suspected. Further evidence surfaced in 2012 involving a local anarchist group.
2 February 1972	Berlin	1	—	Bomb attack	2 June Movement	-- British Military Vehicles and a British yacht-club (British Armed Forces) As a reaction to the Bloody Sunday, an event during The Troubles, the 2nd June Movement bombed two vehicles of the British Armed Forces as well as a British yacht-club. Main article: 2 June Movement
11 May 1972	Frankfurt	1	13	Bomb attack	Red Army Faction	-- Government institutions (Foreign: United States Army) A bomb exploded at the Headquarters, V Corps (US Army) in the Abrams Building (IG Farben Building) in Frankfurt, killing US Army officer Paul A. Bloomquist and injuring a further 13.
24 May 1972	Heidelberg	3	5	Car bombing	Red Army Faction	-- Government institutions (Foreign: United States Army) Two large car bombs were detonated at the US Army Supreme European Command within the Campbell Barracks in Heidelberg, killing three. The dead were identified as Ronald A. Woodward, Charles L. Peck and Captain Clyde R. Bonner.
5 September 1972	Munich	17 (5 perps.)	—	Hostage taking (2 days)	Black September (Palestinian nationalists)	-- Olympic Games Eight armed terrorists staged an attack during the 1972 Summer Olympics in Munich, West Germany on 11 members of the Israeli Olympic team, who were taken hostage and eventually killed, along with a German police officer. Five of the attackers also died in the raid to free the hostages. See also: Munich massacre
7 April 1977	Karlsruhe	3	—	Small arms fire	Red Army Faction	-- Government institutions Shortly after 9:00 CET, a motorcycle pulled up next to the car of Germany's chief federal prosecutor, Siegfried Buback, a stoplight on the outskirts of Karlsruhe in western Germany. The motorcycle passenger proceeded to fire at least 15 bullets into the car. Buback and his 30-year-old driver Wolfgang Göbel died at the scene; the head of the chauffeur service Georg Wurster, 33, succumbed to his injuries six days later. See also: German Autumn
30 July 1977	Oberursel	1	—	Small arms fire	Red Army Faction	-- Business Jürgen Ponto, the head of Dresdner Bank, is shot and killed in his house in Oberursel. It is thought that three assailants attempted to kidnap Ponto, and after he resisted they shot him. He was shot five times and later died of his serious wounds. Susanne Albrecht, the daughter of a good friend of the Pontos, was later identified as one of the attackers. See also: German Autumn
5 September 1977	Cologne	5	—	Small arms fire	Red Army Faction	-- Business A group of armed terrorists attacked the car carrying Hanns Martin Schleyer, then president of the German employers' association, in Cologne. Four masked RAF members sprayed bullets into the two vehicles, killing Schleyer's driver Heinz Marcisz and a police officer, Roland Pieler. The driver of the police escort vehicle, Reinhold Brändle, and a third police officer, Helmut Ulmer, were also killed. Schleyer was abducted and held prisoner in an apartment in a residential neighborhood near Cologne. He was forced to appeal to the West German government under Helmut Schmidt for several RAF members -- then imprisoned -- to be exchanged for him. On 18 October 1977, three of the imprisoned RAF members were found dead in their cells. In response, Schleyer was shot dead en route to Mulhouse, France, where his body was left in an Audi 100. See also: German Autumn
22 August 1980	Hamburg	2	3	Arson	Deutsche Aktionsgruppen Right-wing terrorism	-- Private citizens (Refugees) & property An Arson attack perpetrated by the Right-Wing terrorist group Deutsche Aktionsgruppen targeted a refugee home for Vietnamese. Main article: 1980 Hamburg arson attack
27 September 1980	Munich	12 (one perp.)	213	Suicide bombing	Right-Wing Terrorism (perpetrator: Gundolf Köhler)	-- Private citizens & property A bomb detonates at the Oktoberfest fairgrounds in Theresienwiese, Munich, killing twelve and injuring over two hundred more. The dead include the alleged bomber Gundolf Kohler, a member of the neo-Nazi Military Sport Group Hoffman. Main article: Oktoberfest bombing
11 May 1982	Seckbach (Frankfurt am Main)	1	—	Assassination	Revolutionary Cells (German group)	-- German Politician Heinz-Herbert Karry German Politician and Ministry of the economy of Hesse was murdered in his house by the Revolutionary Cells for supporting further construction of Frankfurt's Airport as well as further construction of the nuclear power plant Biblis.
15 January 1982	Berlin	1	46	Bomb attack	Palestinian Nationalists	-- Private citizens & property An explosion at the Mifgash-Israel, a Jewish owned restaurant in West Berlin, injures 46 people. An infant girl, who was in critical condition after the blast, later dies of her injuries. Main article: 1982 Berlin restaurant bombing
25 August 1983	Berlin	2	23	Bomb attack	ASALA (Armenian nationalists) and Carlos the Jackal	-- Diplomatic (French) A bomb detonates on the fifth floor of the six-story French consulate building in West Berlin, causing extensive damage on the floor below, in which the consulate offices and a visitor's lounge were situated. The 11:20am explosion collapsed sections of the front facade and attic and catapulted parts of interior walls to the street below, although all dead and injured had all been inside the building. Main article: 1983 French consulate bombing
1 February 1985	Munich	1	—	Small arms fire	Red Army Faction	-- Business Head of the Federal Union of German Aerospace and Heavy Industries (BDLI), Ernst Zimmermann, is shot once in the head by a man with a sub-machine gun. The assailant forced his way into the industrialist's home in suburban Munich after his wife opened the door for a woman allegedly claiming to have a letter for Mr. Zimmermann.
19 June 1985	Frankfurt	3	74	Bombing	Abu Nidal Organization	-- Airports & airlines A powerful bomb rips through an international departure lounge of the Frankfurt Airport, killing three people and wounding 42. The dead include a man and two children, and of the many injured, 18 were hospitalized. The explosive device, which the police said appeared to have been placed among seated passengers waiting for their flights, blasted a large hole in the cement floor of the airport terminal, then one of the busiest in Europe. German investigators concluded the perpetrator to be the Abu Nidal Organization. Main article: 1985 Frankfurt airport bombing
8 August 1985	Rhein-Main Air Base	2	20	Car bombing	Red Army Faction & Action Directe	-- Government institutions (Foreign: United States Army) A car bomb explodes outside the headquarters building at the Rhein-Main Air Base, where members of the United States Armed Forces are stationed, killing two Americans and wounding about 20 people. The dead were Airman Frank H. Scarton, 19, who was serving with the 437th Military Airlift Wing, and Becky Jo Bristol, the wife of Senior Airman John Bristol, who was with the Medical Airlift Squadron at the base. Main article: 1985 Rhein-Main Air Base bombing
4 April 1986	Berlin	3	231	Bombing	Libyan agents	-- Private Citizens & Property A bomb placed on the dance-floor of the La Belle Discotheque, popular with United States military personnel, explodes, killing 3 and injuring hundreds more. Two of the dead were members of the United States military. See also: 1986 Berlin discotheque bombing
9 July 1986	Munich	2	—	Bombing	Red Army Faction	-- Business The physicist Karl-Heinz Beckurts, director of research and technology at the Siemens electronic company, and a driver are killed by a remote controlled bomb planted in his car in a Munich suburb.
23 March 1987	Rheindahlen	—	31	Car bombing	Provisional Irish Republican Army (IRA)	-- British military base
19 June 1989	Osnabrück	—	—	Bomb attack	Provisional Irish Republican Army	-- Government institutions (Foreign: British Army) An IRA cell around Donna Maguire planted five explosive devices at the Quebec Barracks in Osnabrück. Of the five devices, only one exploded causing damage to a building. No casualties.
30 November 1989	Bad Homburg vor der Höhe	1	1	Bombing	Red Army Faction	-- Business Banker Alfred Herrhausen dies instantly and his driver is seriously wounded in a blast caused by a remote controlled bomb under his vehicle. Herrhausen, who headed Deutsche Bank A.G., was described as the most powerful person in the West German economy and a dominant figure in European banking.
13 February 1991	Bonn	—	—	Sniper attack	Red Army Faction	-- Government institutions (Foreign: United States) RAF members fire sniper bullets at the American embassy.
16 June 1991	Friedrichshafen	1	—	Stabbing	Mario R. (Neo Nazi)	-- Angolan migrant A 19-year-old neo-Nazi stabbed 36-year-old Angolan man Agostinho Comboio to death out of racial hatred. He was called the hero of Friedrichshafen by neo-Nazis after the incident.
12 October 1991	Holzminden	2	0	Ambush, Shooting	Action Group for the Destruction of the Police State	--Police officers The officers Joerg Lorkowski and Andreas Wilkending were ambushed after heading towards a distress call, near the parking lot in a wooded area in Holzminden. The attackers were captured four days later. Main article: 1991 Holzminden ambush
24 August 1992	Koblenz	1	7	Shooting	Andy Johann H. (Neo-Nazi)	--Civilians Andy Johann H. shot an entire magazine of a semi-automatic weapon into a crowd of homeless people and punks at the central plazza in Koblenz. He was charged with 1 count of murder and seven counts of attempted murder.
23 November 1992	Mölln	3	—	Firebombing	Neo-Nazis	-- Private Citizens & Property A molotov cocktail is thrown into the house of a Turkish migrant family, destroying the property and killing three occupants. Two known neo-Nazis were convicted of murder a year later.
29 May 1993	Solingen	5	14	Firebombing	Far-Right	-- Private Citizens & Property Four young German men (aged between 16 and 23) belonging to the far right skinhead scene, the oldest with known neo-Nazi ties, set fire to the house of a large Turkish family in Solingen in North Rhine-Westphalia. Three girls and two women died; fourteen other family members, including several children, were injured, some of them severely. Main article: Solingen arson attack of 1993
17 November 1993	Cologne	—	—	Small arms fire	Anti-Imperialist Cell	-- Property Multiple shots were fired at the employers Association Gesamtmetall.
27 October 1994	Bad Freienwalde	—	—	Arson	Das K.O.M.I.T.E.E.	-- Bundeswehr Building & Property A Bundeswehr building of the Verteidigungskreiskommandos 852 was completely destroyed.
28 June 1996	Osnabrück	—	—	Mortar attack	Provisional Irish Republican Army	-- Government institutions (Foreign: British Army) Main article: Osnabrück mortar attack
23 October 1996	Leipzig	1	—	Stabbing	Neo-Nazis	--Syrian migrant After verbally attacking and threatening multiple people with a knife, two Neo-Nazis stabbed to death a Syrian refugee.
23 February 1997	Roseburg	1	1	Shooting	Kay Diesner (Neo-Nazi)	--Police officers Kay Diesner, a prominent figure in Berlin's neo‑Nazi scene, opened fire on two policemen at a highway pull‑in near Rosenburg, killing one officer and wounding the other.
9 June 2004	Cologne	—	22	Pipe bombing	National Socialist Underground	-- Private Citizens & Property
9 September 2000 to 25 April 2007	Munich Nuremberg Heilbronn Dortmund Rostock Kassel	10	1	Serial Killing, Small arms fire	National Socialist Underground	-- Government institutions, Private Citizens & Property
26 February 2009	Burg bei Magdeburg	—	—	Arson	Militante gruppe left-wing extremists	--Bundeswehr vehicle The left-wing extremist group militante gruppe (mg) firebombed a Bundeswehr vehicle. The arson attack was officially their last attack out of at least 25.
11 November 2009	Frankfurt	—	—	Arson	Bewegung Morgenlicht	Solitary activist pretending to be a movement attacked a bank with fire bomb
30 December 2009	Berlin	—	—	Bomb attack	Revolutionäre Aktionszellen (RAZ) left-wing terrorists	--Employmeent agency The left-wing extremist group Revolutionäre Aktionszellen (RAZ) bombed an employment agency building in Berlin.
4 February 2010	Berlin	—	—	Bomb attack	Revolutionäre Aktionszellen (RAZ) left-wing terrorists	--House of economy The left-wing extremist group Revolutionäre Aktionszellen (RAZ) bombed the house of economy in Berlin.
19 November 2010	Berlin	—	—	Firebombing	Revolutionäre Aktionszellen (RAZ) left-wing terrorists	--German Federal Administrative Office Berlin The left-wing extremist group Revolutionäre Aktionszellen (RAZ) firebombed the German Federal Administrative Office Berlin.
2 March 2011	Frankfurt	2	2	Small arms fire	Arid Uka	-- Government institutions (Foreign: United States Army) An immigrant from Kosovo fires upon a United States Air Force bus, killing two and wounding two. At the time of the attack, the vehicle was parked outside the terminal building waiting to transport 15 U.S. airmen to Ramstein Air Base. The attacker first shoots an airman outside the vehicle, and then enters the bus, shooting and killing the driver and firing three shots at two other airmen, wounding them. Perpetrator had done it to avenge U.S. military operations in Afghanistan Main article: 2011 Frankfurt Airport shooting
3 December 2011	Göttingen	—	—	Firebombing	Revolutionäre Aktionszellen (RAZ)	--County Court The left-wing extremist group Revolutionäre Aktionszellen (RAZ) bombed the Courthouse in Göttingen.The bombing was their fifth attack.
14 May 2012	Potsdam	0	0	Arson	Friends of Loukanikos	--County Court Assailants set fire to the car and vandalized the house of Horst Reichenbach (an important European Union (EU) official) in Potsdam city, Brandenburg state, leaving important material damage. The group Friends of Loukanikos claimed the attack for to protest austerity measures imposed on Greece.
17 September 2015	Cologne	—	5	Stabbing	Frank S. (Right-wing extremist)	-- Henriette Reker (Politician) 44 year old Frank S. seriously injured Henriette Reker with a knife in an assassination attempt. He then injured 4 additional people who tried to disarm him.
17 October 2015	Berlin	1 (one perp.)	1	Stabbing	Rafik Mohamad Yousef	-- Government institutions (Police) 41-year-old Rafik Yousef threatened several civilians with a knife and was fatally shot after stabbing an intervening police officer. Yousef was a member of Ansar al-Islam in Kurdistan and had been previously convicted for planning an assassination attempt against Iraqi prime minister Ayad Allawi in 2004
1 November 2015	Freital	—	1	Bomb attack	Gruppe Freital (Right-wing extremists)	-- Refugee accommodation Members of the right-wing terrorist group Gruppe Freital detonate an illegal explosive in front of a window of a refugee housing. One refugee gets injured in the face.
5 February 2016	Hanover	—	—	Arson	Saleh S. (Islamist)	-- Civilians 17-year old Saleh S. threw two Molotov Cocktails at the entrance of a shopping-mall in Hanover. He was later charged with 7 counts of attempted murder after admitting that he wanted to kill as many people as possible. Just 3 weeks later his sister Safia S. attacked a police officer with a knife.
26 February 2016	Hanover	—	1	Stabbing	Safia S. (Islamist)	-- Government institutions (Police) A policeman was severely injured by a 15-year old girl, Safia S., who was acting "on behalf of the Islamic State"
16 April 2016	Essen	—	3	Bomb attack	Yussuf T. and Mohammed B. Islamic terrorism	-- Sikh temple Around 7 pm, the two radicalized youths threw an improvised explosive device onto the grounds of a Sikh-temple in Essen. Three people were injured by the bombing.
19 July 2016	Würzburg	1 (one perp.)	5	Axe attack	Riaz Khan Ahmadzai (Islamic State of Iraq and the Levant)	-- Private Citizens & Property Main article: 2016 Würzburg train attack
22 July 2016	Munich	10 (one perp.)	36	Shooting	David Sonboly (Right-wing terrorism)	-- Private Citizens & Property Main article: 2016 Munich shooting
24 July 2016	Ansbach	1 (one perp.)	12	Suicide bombing	Mohammad Daleel (Islamic State of Iraq and the Levant)	-- Private Citizens & Property Main article: 2016 Ansbach bombing
26 September 2016	Dresden	—	—	Pipe bombing	Nino K. Right-wing terrorism	-- Mosque & International Congress Center Dresden In the late evening of 26 September 2016, Nino K. set up two bombs in Dresden, one targeting a Mosque and the other targeting the International Congress Center Dresden. He pledged guilty in February 2018.
19 December 2016	Berlin	13	55	Truck attack	Anis Amri (Islamic State of Iraq and the Levant)	-- Private Citizens & Property Main article: 2016 Berlin truck attack
28 July 2017	Hamburg	1	6	Stabbing	Ahmad Alhaw (Islamic State)	-- Private Citizens Main article: 2017 Hamburg attack
March 2018	Multiple cities	—	—	Multiple arson	Kurdish extremists and left-wing extremists	--Turkish Mosques, stores and cultural centers As part of a wave of attacks and acts of violence against Turks and Turkish organizations as a response to the Turkish-kurdish conflict, Kurdish and left-wing extremists committed numerous arson attacks and non-violent operations in all of Germany.
12 March 2018	Gütersloh	—	—	Arson	Left-wing extremist cell Vulkangruppe NetzHerrschaft zerreißen	--Power supply system After an arson attack on part of Berlins power supply system, roughly 6.500 households were left without electricity for numerous hours. A left-wing extremist group, calling itself Vulkangruppe NetzHerrschaft zerreißen claimed responsibility for the attack.
26 March 2018	North Rhine-Westphalia	—	—	Arson	Anarchist communist extremist group Action Cell Haukur Hilmarsson	--Power supply system Militants burn three vehicles in Gütersloh, North Rhine-Westphalia. The Action Cell Haukur Hilmarsson claimed responsibility for the incident and stated that the attack was carried out in retaliation for Turkish military operations in Afrin.
24 December 2018	Hambach Forest	—	—	Arson	Green anarchist group Hambi Chaos Crew	--Pumping station
3 January 2019	Döbeln	—	—	Bomb attack	Left-wing extremists	--Alternative for Germany office After a bomb attack on the AfD office in Döbeln, three men were arrested and convicted.
31 May 2019	Bremen	—	1	Stabbing	Right-wing extremists	--Muslim civilian A Muslim teenager was insulted islamophobically in a tram and stabbed with a knife in the neck.
2 June 2019	Wolfhagen	1	—	Assassination	Right-wing extremist	--Walter Lübcke Walter Lübcke, President of the district Kassel and member of the Christian Democratic Union of Germany (CDU) was shot dead outside his home in Wolfhagen. A political, right-wing motive has been confessed by the murderer Stephan Ernst who is a member of the terrorist group Combat 18 (C18) and the National Democratic Party of Germany (NPD). Main article: Murder of Walter Lübcke
22 July 2019	Wächtersbach	1 (one perp.)	1	Murder-suicide/Drive-by-shooting	Right-wing extremist	--Random African citizen On Monday, the 22nd of July, the unnamed perpetrator set off to randomly kill a person, the only requirement he had for his target was dark skin. After seriously wounding a man from Eritrea in a drive-by-shooting, the perpetrator went to a bar, where he boasted about his crime. Later on, the perpetrator killed himself.
23 July 2019	Zittau	—	—	Bombing	Suspected right-wing extremists	--Ramona Gehring (Politician) A powerful explosion destroyed multiple windows of the home of the targeted politician of Die Linke. Right-wing extremists, possibly Combat 18, are the susptected perpetrators.
27 September 2019	Berlin	—	—	Arson	Left-wing extremists	--Court building A left-wing group has claimed responsibility for an arson attack on the Pankow court in Berlin. The arson attack was part of the left-wing campaign Tu Mal Wat days.
9 October 2019	Halle (Saale)	2	2	Attempted mass shooting	Right-wing extremist	--Synagogue and Turkish restaurant Main article: Halle synagogue shooting A man who was armed with multiple firearms and home-made bombs unsuccessfully attempted to force his way into a synagogue during Yom Kippur prayers, shooting and killing one passer-by. He subsequently fired into a nearby kebab restaurant, killing one customer. Pursued by police, he shot and wounded another man in an attempted carjacking, before being captured. Video and text material which the suspect posted online expressed his extremist anti-Semitic, anti-immigrant, and anti-feminist views as well as his admiration for perpetrators of earlier acts of right-wing terrorism.
19 February 2020	Hanau	11 (one perp.)	5	Mass shootings	Right-wing extremist	--Hookah bars Main article: Hanau shootings On 19 February 2020, two mass shootings occurred, targeting two shisha bars/hookah lounges in Hanau, Hesse, Germany. Eleven people, including the perpetrator, were killed and five others injured in the shootings, sparking a police manhunt. The gunman, identified as Tobias Rathjen, was eventually found dead in his apartment alongside his mother, who had also been killed.
18 August 2020	Berlin	—	6	Vehicle-ramming attack	Sarmad al-Z.(Islamist)	--Motorists On 18 August 2020, a 30-year-old Iraqi man rammed his car into other motorists on the Bundesautobahn 100 in Berlin injuring six people. The man expressed support for Islamic extremist views. Main article: de:Amokfahrt auf der Berliner Stadtautobahn
4 October 2020	Dresden	1	1	Stabbing	Abdullah al-H. H. (Islamist)	--Civilians On 4 October 2020, a 20-year-old Syrian asylum seeker stabbed a gay couple, killing one and injuring another in Dresden. The man was known by authorities to be an Islamist extremist.
26 May 2021	Berlin	—	—	Arson	Left-wing extremist group Vulkangruppe NetzHerrschaft zerreißen	--Power cables to factory Tesla Gigafactory Berlin was attacked by saboteurs who set cables supplying electricity to the construction site on fire.
18 September 2021	Idar-Oberstein	1	—	Shooting	Mario N. (Opponent of Covid restrictions)	--Civilian After a dispute between a cashier and a customer about mandatory mask wearing at a petrol station, the 49-year old customer returned an hour later and killed the 20 year old cashier with a gunshot to the head. The perpetrator stated that the murder was motivated by his opposition to restrictions in place to contain the COVID-19 pandemic in Germany. Main article: 2021 Idar-Oberstein shooting
3 June 2022	Potsdam	-	—	Attempted bombing	Totenwaffen	--Civilians A radicalized young male was arrested in the city of Potsdam for receiving instruction on the construction of firearms, ammunition, and explosive devices, as well as chemicals for their manufacture. The suspect constructed "unconventional explosives" and incendiary devices and has carried them out in these initial tests. The suspect was part of an accelerationist cell which looking to start a racial war.

=== Islamic terrorism ===
In the 2015–2020 time span, there were 9 Islamic terrorist attacks and thwarted terrorist plots where at least one of the perpetrators had entered Germany as an asylum seeker during the European migrant crisis. The Islamic terrorists entered Germany either without identity documents or with falsified documents. The number of discovered plots began to decline in 2017. In 2020 German authorities noted that the majority of the asylum seekers entered Germany without identification papers during the crisis and security agencies considered unregulated immigration as problematic from a security aspect. Between 2020 and May 2025, 9 terrorist attacks classified as Islamist took place, including the 2020 Dresden stabbing and the 2024 Solingen stabbings. These attacks typically used knives and vehicles; attackers were increasingly young and radicalized online, especially as a result of the Gaza war, and typically acted alone without formal membership of terrorist groups such as Islamic State.

==== Thwarted islamist terror attacks ====
In December 2019, German authorities reported to have thwarted ten Islamic terrorist plots since the 2016 Berlin truck attack, including one in Cologne in 2018. Between 2020 and 2025, 20 Islamic terrorist attacks were publicly reported as being prevented by German authorities.

=== 2025 Christmas market arrests ===
In December 2025, five men were arrested in Germany on suspicion of plotting a vehicle attack on a Christmas market in southern Bavarian state, with authorities suspecting an"Islamist motive". The suspects included three Moroccans, an Egyptian, and a Syrian, who were detained over the plan. Prosecutors stated that the 56 year old Egyptian, reportedly an imam, had called for a vehicle attack "with the aim of killing or injuring as many people as possible," while the Moroccan men, aged 30, 28, and 22, allegedly agreed to carry out the attack. The 37-year-old Syrian was accused of encouraging the others in their planned actions. Officials did not disclose the intended date or exact target but believed the planned attack was in the Dingolfing-Landau area, northeast of Munich. Bavarian Interior Minister Joachim Herrmann praised the "excellent cooperation between our security services" for preventing a potentially Islamist-motivated attack.

=== List of international terrorist incidents (outside Germany) with significant German casualties ===
- Eleven German nationals died as a result of the September 11 attacks in 2001 in the United States.
- Six German nationals died as a result of the bombings of several Balinese tourist clubs in Indonesia on 12 October 2002.
- Fourteen German nationals died as a result of the bombing of a synagogue on the island of Djerba in Tunisia on 11 April 2002.
- 12 out of 13 tourists killed in the January 2016 Istanbul bombing were German, while another six were injured.
- At least six German nationals died as a result of the October 7 attack in 2023 in Israel, including Shani Louk, whose body was later recovered from Gaza in May 2024.

== Terrorist incidents in Germany since 1970 ==
Terrorist incidents in Germany
Year	Incidents	Deaths	Injuries
2024	1	8	205
2020	3	11	12
2019	12	3	14
2018	22	0	8
2017	27	1	10
2016	44	27	117
2015	66	1	38
2014	13	0	0
2013	0	0	0
2012	5	0	0
2011	8	2	2
2010	1	0	0
2009	4	0	0
2008	3	0	2
2007	3	1	1
2006	4	2	0
2005	3	2	0
2004	3	1	25
2003	2	0	0
2002	3	0	2
2001	8	3	6
2000	8	1	28
1999	13	3	47
1998	6	0	0
1997	12	0	27
1996	52	1	5
1995	147	10	26
1994	79	2	85
1993	37	7	58
1992	156	17	217
1991	65	10	35
1990	13	1	4
1989	22	5	8
1988	18	1	14
1987	20	2	33
1986	49	10	276
1985	57	9	114
1984	22	0	3
1983	6	2	25
1982	30	5	44
1981	31	2	31
1980	20	17	218
1979	17	0	10
1978	20	0	4
1977	41	6	2
1976	50	4	36
1975	35	1	12
1974	29	2	10
1973	27	1	1
1972	24	23	45
1971	17	0	0
1970	32	8	9
Total	1,308	213	1,838

== In popular culture ==
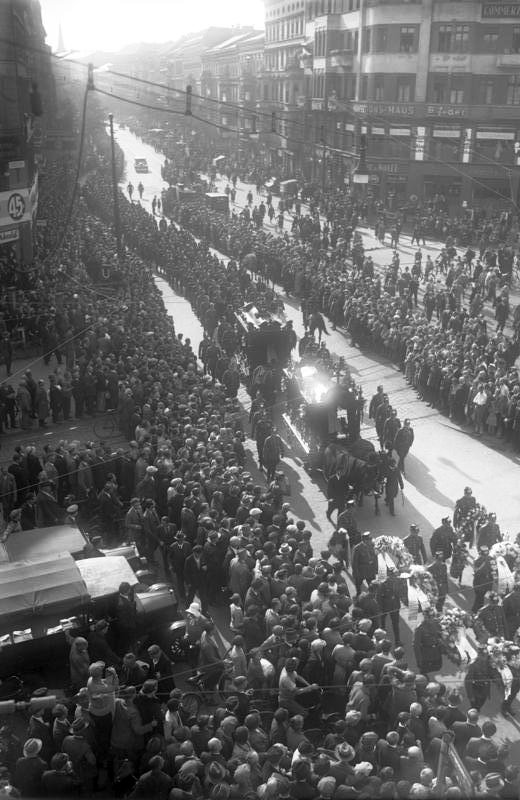
Berlin citizens attending the funeral of assassinated police captains Paul Anlauf and Franz Lenck in 1931

A number of books and films address this topic.

=== Films ===
- The Arsonists (Brandstifter, 1969)
- The Lost Honor of Katharina Blum (1975)
- Germany in Autumn (1978)
- The Third Generation (1979)
- The German Sisters (1981)
- Stammheim (1986)
- Die Hard (1988)
- Die Hard With A Vengeance (1995)
- Death Game (1997)
- The State I Am In (2000)
- The Legend of Rita (2000)
- Black Box BRD (2001)
- Baader (2002)
- Enemy of the State (2003)
- In Love With Terror (2003)
- Munich (2005)
- The Baader Meinhof Complex (2008)
- Children of the Revolution (2010)
- A Most Wanted Man (2014)
- NSU German History X (2016)

== See also ==
- NSU murders
- List of massacres in Germany
- List of terrorist incidents
- Left-wing terrorism
- Right-wing terrorism
- Right-wing terrorism in Germany
- Terrorism in the European Union
