= Rote Zora =

Rote Zora (English: Red Zora) may refer to:

- Die rote Zora und ihre Bande, translated as The Outsiders of Uskoken Castle, a 1941 children's novel by Kurt Kläber
  - Die rote Zora und ihre Bande (TV series), 1979 television series based on the novel
  - Die Rote Zora, 2008 film based on the novel
- Rote Zora (group), a West German far-left feminist organization active 1974–1995
