= 1970 Munich bus attack =

Terrorist incident at a German airport

Coordinates: 48.136°N 11.718°E

- Location: Munich-Riem Airport, Munich, West Germany
- Date: 10 February 1970 c. 12:50 – 12:59
- Attack type: Attempted aircraft hijacking; grenade attack; shootout; terrorist attack
- Weapons: 7,65 mm Star handgun 9 mm Star handgun 7,65 mm Llama Especiale handgun RGD-5 handgrenades
- Deaths: 1
- Injuries: 13 (including two perpetrators)
- Perpetrator: Action Organization for the Liberation of Palestine
- Assailants: Mohamed el-Hanafi; Mohamed Hadidi; Abder Rahman Saleh

On 10 February 1970, a bus carrying passengers to an airplane at the Munich-Riem Airport, West Germany, was attacked by terrorists. One person was killed and 13 were wounded in the attack.

== Background ==
The attack was organised by the Action Organization for the Liberation of Palestine, a secessionist faction of Fatah, as one of two aircraft hijackings targeting El Al, the flag carrier airline of Israel. AOLP founder Issam Sartawi tasked two three-man commandos with taking control of two El Al machines during stopovers on 10 February 1970, one in London and one in Munich, with the intention of flying them to Tripoli, Libya. Previously, the Popular Front for the Liberation of Palestine (PDFLP) had targeted the Embassy of Israel in Bonn as part of a synchronised bombing in Den Haag and Brussels, although no one was harmed in the Bonn embassy attack.

The unit tasked with the Munich hijacking was designated the "Martyr Omar Sartawi Division", after Issam Sartawi's brother, who had been killed by an Israeli airstrike the prior year. The commando was provided with travel visas for several European countries in January 1970 and on 6 February, they were given the order to attack a plane flying from Tel Aviv to London at Munich-Riem Airport. Armed with three pistols and four handgrenades, it was planned to take passengers at gunpoint in a waiting room after the boarding announcement and use a shuttle bus to transport them to the plane. If this plan failed, the commando was supposed to hijack the plane with only its crew and at further resistance, they would detonate the grenades to blow up the machine in a suicide attack.

== Attack ==
On 10 February 1970, at 8:30 a.m., an El Al Boeing 707 took off from Ben Gurion Airport (then Lod Airport), en route from Tel Aviv to London, on a flight that included a stop-over in Munich. The plane, carrying 52 passengers and 11 crew members, landed in Munich at 12:28 p.m., and 34 passengers disembarked. The 18 additional passengers bound for London waited inside a transit waiting room to board the flight to London. The room was shared with 12 passengers of a Swissair flight and the three later attackers, who had flown in from Paris two hours earlier.

At 12:45 p.m., the 18 passengers were called over the loudspeaker to the departure gate to board the shuttle bus that would take them to the plane. The passengers were also joined by the plane's crew members. Some of the passengers were already seated inside the bus, while one passenger, actor Assi Dayan, and the plane's captain, Uriel Cohen, were still in the transit room. Dayan noticed three men walking towards them, one openly wielding a firearm and two carrying grenades. Two of the men approached the captain, with one openly displaying a grenade and telling Cohen in English "I've got a bomb. You can't do anything". Cohen, who was 198 cm tall, tried to wrestle the grenade out of his hands. At 12:53 p.m., the grenade exploded in the terrorist's hand, blowing it apart, while Cohen's arm was torn.

After the explosion, the bus driver tried to move the vehicle and its passengers away from the scene, but the third terrorist stood in front of the bus and held the driver at gunpoint. At the terrorist's instruction, the driver opened the bus doors, telling him that he was allowing the passengers to exit. Before they could reach the exit, the gunman threw a grenade into the bus. The driver was able to jump out of the bus and as the remaining people inside ducked for cover, 32-year-old Arie Katzenstein threw himself on the grenade to protect the other passengers. The people inside were injured by the blast, with Katzenstein's body blocking most of the shrapnel.

Eight members of the Bavarian Border Police arrived soon after. The second terrorist still inside the transit room exchanged fire with officers, being injured and fleeing into the restroom. Outside, an officer was injured while engaging in a shootout with the other remaining gunman. Both were wounded, but the gunman managed to flee back inside, detonating a third grenade in his hand inside the transit room. Actress Hanna Maron sustained heavy leg wounds. During the chaos, a German traveller broke through a glass window and broke his hip during the fall. Bavarian Police arrived five minutes after hearing the first detonation, arresting the two terrorists in the transit room and finding the remaining terrorist hiding in a toilet cubicle. Both of those who had detonated grenades lost limbs, one requiring amputation of a hand and another having his right forearm amputated.

As the actor Assi Dayan, son of the Israeli Defence Minister Moshe Dayan was among the passengers, some speculated that he was the target of the attack. Others denied this, saying the attack was indiscriminate and Dayan himself escaped unhurt. Another passenger, actress Hanna Maron, was critically wounded and had to have her leg amputated.

== Aftermath ==
The Jewish Telegraphic Agency initially reported 23 injuries, including four seriously wounded. German authorities had first counted 11 injuries, which was increased to 18 injuries by 1973, including two of the terrorists. The official memorial commemorates the initial number of 11 injuries: five passengers, three crew members, two security officers, and one uninvolved traveller. Other modern sources count 12 injured.

Both the AOLP and the PDFLP claimed responsibility for the attack.

The identities of the three terrorists were initially unclear, as was the role which of them played in the attack. They were first named as an Egyptian engineer, Mohammed el-Hanafi (24), and two Jordanian students, Mohammed Hadidi (28) and Abder Rahman Saleh (21). By July 1970, it was found that they had given false identities and were all Palestinians with Jordanian citizenship: "El-Hanafi" was 21-year-old Mufeed al-Gawabri (born 2 March 1948 in Kafr al Rahi), "Hadidi" was 20-year-old Nachàat Omar Ibrahim (born 20 October 1949 in Nablus) and "Saleh" was 17-year-old Abdel Rahim Saleh Mustafa Saleh (born 15 September 1952 in Silwad).

By their own account, the trio had intended to hijack the plane bound for London, believing that they would transport everyone to the plane with the bus, not anticipating that anyone would fight back. They had prepared two notes, one to be read to the air traffic control tower and the other through the cockpit speaker, which the terrorists had discarded in the airport, but were pieced back together two days later. The terrorists were released and deported later in October of the same year in exchange for the hostages of the Dawson's Field hijackings.

In 2023, Munich's cultural office announced the planning of a memorial at the former Riem Airport in cooperation with Brainlab. The memorial was unveiled in 2025, on the 55th anniversary, with several of the still-living victims and their families in attendance, including the parents of Arie Katzenstein. It consists of a statue designed by Alicja Kwade and an information plate.

== See also ==
- Munich massacre
