= Arab Palestine Organization =

Palestinian political faction

The Arab Palestine Organisation (APO) (Arabic: منظمة فلسطين العربية), also known as the Arab Palestine Liberation Organisation (APLO), was a small Palestinian armed faction, which was active during the late 1960s and early 1970s. The APO had Nasserist politics.

== Formation ==
The APO was formed in late 1968 or early 1969, when Ahmed Zarur, a Jordanian Nasserist and former army officer, led a split from Ahmed Jibril's Popular Front for the Liberation of Palestine - General Command (PFLP-GC). Zarur and Jibril had each led a separate group of followers to join with the Arab Nationalist Movement (ANM) to found the Popular Front for the Liberation of Palestine (PFLP) in December 1967, before splitting together to found the PFLP-GC in October 1968. Like Jibril, Zarur was assessed by the CIA in December 1970 to be "fanatically consumed by the single goal of liberating Palestine".

Zarur's splinter tried to adopt a version of the PFLP-GC's name. On 5 August 1969, the Palestine Armed Struggle Command, a coordinating body of several armed factions led by Fatah, announced that it had admitted a group named "PFLP General Command -- Wing A Independents." This was Zarur and his followers. But according to a January 1971 CIA assessment based "primarily on clandestine sources":

Zarur's attempt to retain the General Command name failed when General Command chief Jabril threatened to wipe out Zarur's group if the name was not changed. The title of Arab Palestine's [sic.] organization was thus adopted.

== 1969 attempted bombing in İzmir, Turkey ==
Also in August 1969, according to the January 1971 CIA assessment, the APO claimed responsibility for the attempted bombing of the Israeli pavilion at the International Fair in Izmir, Turkey. However, the authorship of the attack is disputed.

The attempt was made on 23 August 1969 by two Jordanian students who ultimately were deterred from planting the bomb by a heavy police guard. After they left, the bomb exploded, killing one of the students. The bomb had been set to go off at 1:30 a.m. after the pavilion closed for the night. According to The New York Times, the surviving student told police he had been trained by "National Front for the Liberation of Palestine", which may have been a reference to the Palestinian National Liberation Front. The Turkish authorities announced that the surviving student might be charged over carrying explosives, but not for attempting to blow up the pavilion.

The Turkish newspaper Cumhuriyet reported that the political police had determined that the two students were members of the "Fatah commandos", and that governor Namık Kemal Şentürk had said the bomb was smuggled in from Turkey. According to the same newspaper, a public security official claimed that one of the students was a member of the "Popular Liberation Front in Jordan" (likely a reference to the PFLP) and the other a member of the Democratic Front for the Liberation of Palestine (DFLP).

The Israeli newspaper Maariv (in 1986) and the UK-based Community Security Trust (since 2010) have claimed that the two students were members of the DFLP.

== Summer 1970 clashes over the Rogers Plan ==
In summer 1970, the APO came into conflict with several other Palestinian factions, albeit only "briefly" according to a CIA assessment formulated shortly afterward. The context for the dispute was Gamal Abdel Nasser's acceptance, on behalf of the United Arab Republic (UAR) of the Second Rogers Plan, a June 1970 proposal by the United States to bring a halt to the ongoing the War of Attrition. Many Arabs, especially Palestinians, viewed Nasser's move as a capitulation, and had expected him to keep fighting until Israel was defeated.

On 1 August 1970, the APO released a joint statement with Issam Sartawi's Active Organisation for the Liberation of Palestine (AOLP), in which they held that Nasser's acceptance of the proposal was merely tactical and temporary, in order to allow the UAR to rebuild its strength. The two organisations stated that they rejected both the Rogers Plan and attempts to exploit Nasser's acceptance of it to sow division amongst Palestinians.

On 3 August, Sartawi stated that both the APO and AOLP rejected peaceful solutions with Israel in general and the Rogers Plan in particular, but that the UAR had the right to use diplomacy as a weapon.

A spokesperson for the DFLP had criticised Nasser at a rally in late July, which the CIA assessed led the APO, AOLP and Palestinian Popular Struggle Front to fight in armed clashes with the DFLP during the first few days of August. The historian Yezid Sayigh records that PFLP and Arab Liberation Front gunmen attacked APO and AOLP offices on 5 and 9 August and "desisted only after the intervention of Fatah."

The APO claimed on 11 August 1970 that the PFLP had attacked their office in Lebanon. The accusation was however withdrawn at a meeting in which eight Palestinian factions, including APO, denied the PFLP's involvement in the attack.

== Estimated strength and merger into Fatah ==
A January 1971 CIA report recorded the agency's view that the APO had fewer than 50 members, and had "not done much". A Jordanian academic, writing more recently, was more generous about the APO's size, but held that at no point did it have more than 300 members.

The APO later merged into Fatah.

== Sources ==
- Sayigh, Yezid (1997). Armed Struggle and the Search for State. Oxford: Clarendon Press. ISBN 0-19-829265-1.
