= Die rote Zora und ihre Bande (TV series) =

- Directed by: Fritz Umgelter
- Country of origin: Germany

Die rote Zora und ihre Bande is a German television series, based on the 1941 children's novel The Outsiders of Uskoken Castle by Kurt Held.

== See also ==
Die Rote Zora, a German militant feminist group active in West Germany from 1974–1995, who took their name from the story because the band was founded and led by a girl.

- List of German television series
