= Issam Sartawi =

Palestinian cardiologist, guerrilla leader, and PLO diplomat (1935–1983)

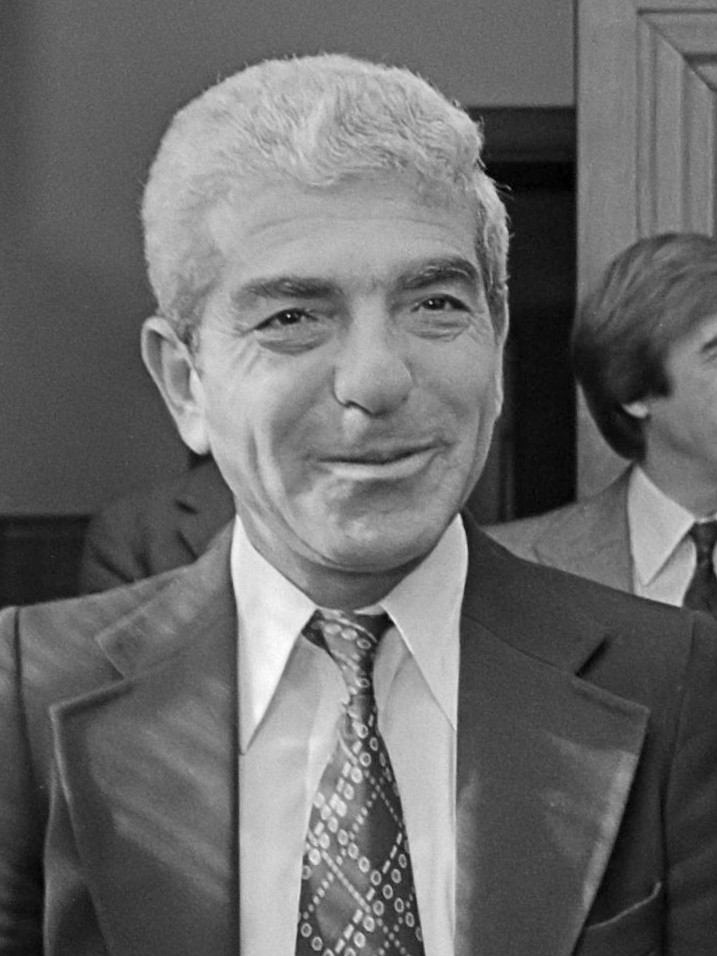

Senior member of the Palestine Liberation Organization

Personal details
- Born: 1 January 1934 or 1935 Acre, Palestine
- Died: 10 April 1983 Albufeira, Portugal
- Cause of death: Assassination by gunshot
- Resting place: Amman, Jordan
- Party: Action Organisation for the Liberation of Palestine, Fatah
- Education: University of Baghdad
- Profession: Cardiologist, guerrilla leader, politician and diplomat

Issam Sartawi (Arabic: عصام السرطاوي; 1935 – 10 April 1983) was a Palestinian cardiologist, guerrilla leader, politician and diplomat. He led a small fedayeen organisation in Jordan between 1968 and 1971 and became during that time a senior member of the Palestine Liberation Organisation (PLO). He merged his organisation into Fatah, and became the personal envoy of Yasser Arafat to both European governments and moderate Israeli civil society. He is remembered for both his moderate stance within the PLO and his participation in dialogues with his Israeli counterparts during the 1970s.

Sartawi was assassinated on 10 April 1983 by the Abu Nidal Organisation, a Palestinian faction opposed to compromise with Israel and under the direction of Syria's Air Force Intelligence Directorate.

== Early life and education ==
Issam Sartawi was born in Akka, British Mandate Palestine on 1 January 1934 or in 1935, according to different accounts.

The forebears of his father, Ali had come from the village of Sarta near Nablus. During the Nakba in 1948, the Haganah conquered Akka, and Sartawi's family fled, along with two thirds of the city's inhabitants. The family made their way to the West Bank as refugees, where they were supported by Ali's extended family.

Ali, not wanting to be a burden on his extended family, accepted the offer of a teaching job in Baghdad, Iraq, and moved his family there. Sartawi studied engineering at the University of Baghdad. Sartawi won a two year scholarship to train for work in the oil industry in England, but on his return in 1954 changed his course of study to medicine. He graduated in 1963, married fellow student Widad al-Mufti, and the couple moved to Cleveland, Ohio, in the United States. Both earned their MDs there, working at Cleveland Metropolitan General Hospital: he as a cardiologist, she as a gynecologist. According to Everett Mendelsohn, Sartawi spent a year of medical residence in Boston, at Massachusetts General Hospital.

== Politics ==
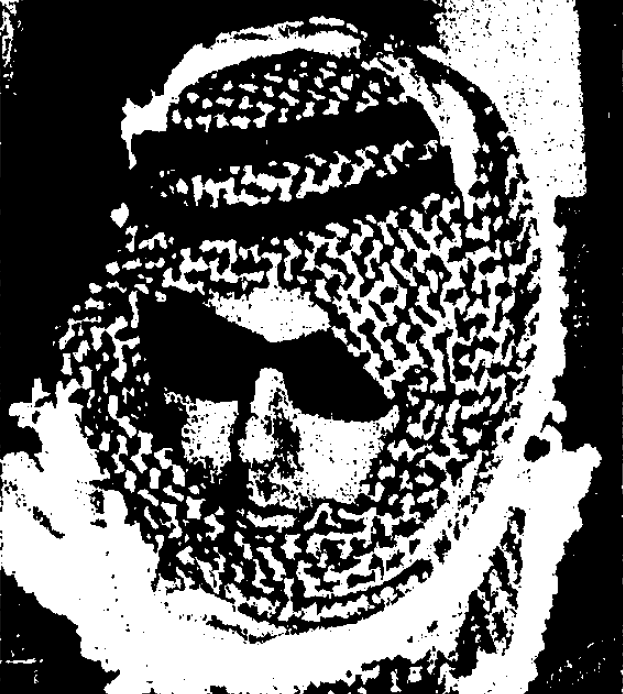
This picture, purportedly of Sartawi, wearing a kuffiyah, was used to illustrate a section on the AOLP in a 1971 CIA report

=== Foundation of the Action Organisation for the Liberation of Palestine ===
Sartawi moved to Jordan in 1967, after the Naksa, where he joined Fatah, met Said Hammami, and fought against Israeli forces at the Battle of Karameh on 21 March 1968. He also helped to establish the Palestine Red Crescent Society.

Sartawi soon seceded from Fatah to found the Action Organisation for the Liberation of Palestine (AOLP) (Arabic: الهيئة العاملة لتحرير فلسطين or منظمة العمل لتحرير فلسطين). The AOLP merged with Fatah in 1968, but then seceded again on 23 May 1969, led by Sartawi. Around this time, Sartawi reportedly claimed 400 members, which the CIA thought was an exaggeration - and that nearly two years later the true number was still likely under 100. He claimed that the AOLP had conducted 13 operations inside Israeli-occupied territory.

In January 1970, the AOLP participated in an attack on a busload of El Al passengers in Munich airport, in which the Israeli actress Hannah Maron was wounded. In June 1970 Sartawi was elected to the PLO executive as a representative of the AOLP.

On 16 June 1970, Sartawi was appointed to a permanent secretariat established by the PLO to stand in for the central committee during crisis situations. Also on the committee were George Habash, Nayef Hawatmeh, Kamal Nasir and a commander of As-Sa'iqa.

=== Clashes over the Rogers Plan ===
In summer 1970, the APO came into conflict with several other Palestinian factions. The context for the dispute was Gamal Abdel Nasser's acceptance, on behalf of the United Arab Republic (UAR) of the Second Rogers Plan, a June 1970 proposal by the United States to bring a halt to the ongoing War of Attrition. Nasser accepted the plan on 22 July. Many Arabs, especially Palestinians, viewed Nasser's move as a capitulation, and had expected him to keep fighting until Israel was defeated.

On 1 August 1970, the AOLP released a joint statement with Ahmed Zarur's Arab Palestine Organisation, in which they held that Nasser's acceptance of the proposal was merely tactical and temporary, in order to allow the UAR to rebuild its strength. The two organisations stated that they rejected both the Rogers Plan and attempts to exploit Nasser's acceptance of it to sow division amongst Arabs.

On 3 August, Sartawi stated that both the APO and AOLP rejected peaceful solutions with Israel in general and the Rogers Plan in particular, but that the UAR had the right to use diplomacy as a weapon. The Palestinian historian Yezid Sayigh records that PFLP and Arab Liberation Front gunmen attacked APO and AOLP offices on 5 and 9 August and "desisted only after the intervention of Fatah." Sartawi later described to Israeli peace activist Uri Avnery how he had organised the AOLP's defence against the PFLP attack on its office, having learned in advance that the attack was coming.

In December 1970, CIA analyst Carolyn McGiffert Ekedahl assessed that the AOLP was "fiercely defensive of its independence" and, while politically aligned with the pan-Arab, socialist views of the Ba'ath parties, was not tied to the rulers of either Syria or Iraq. The analyst added that Sartawi seemed to have "fanatic characteristics."

The AOLP announced at the ninth session of the Palestinian National Council, held in Cairo in July 1971, that it would rejoin Fatah

=== As a PLO diplomat ===
Sartawi became Yasser Arafat's adviser on Europe and North America.

In the mid-1970s Sartawi participated, as a personal emissary of Yasser Arafat and alongside other moderate PLO members in the "Paris meetings" with the Israeli Council for Israeli-Palestinian Peace of General Matti Peled. The meetings were sponsored by former French Premier Pierre Mendès France. Sartawi and the senior Israeli negotiator, Aryeh "Lova" Eliav, jointly received the Bruno Kreisky Prize for Services to Human Rights in 1979 for their work to end the Arab-Israeli conflict.

Uri Avnery later wrote that Sartawi once told him that a French antisemitic leader came to his office in Paris and offered an alliance and that he threw him out; Avnery recalled that Sartawi said "the anti-Semites are the greatest enemies of the Palestinian people".

Sartawi disagreed with Arafat's rejection of Ronald Reagan's peace plan proposal of September 1982, according to which Palestinians on the West Bank and in Gaza would govern themselves for a five-year period, and then engage in negotiations for an Israeli withdrawal, and, eventually a Palestinian-Jordanian state. Sartawi thought that under Arafat the Palestinian National Council was refusing to be realistic and that it should have accepted the positive points in Reagan's proposal. He rejected as wishful thinking attempts to interpret the recent defeat in Lebanon in 1982 as a victory, remarking: "Another victory like this and the PLO will find itself in the Fiji Islands." His position found scarce support, and when Arafat barred him from speaking before the PNC, he put in his resignation. Arafat twice refused to accept Sartawi's resignation.

In November 1982, Sartawi spoke at the Oxford Union debating society, in support of the motion that "This House believes that Israel should enter into negotiations with the PLO to create an independent Palestinian homeland in the West Bank and the Gaza Strip." Unlike prior pro-Palestinian motions, it was passed by an overwhelming majority.

== Assassination ==
In February 1983, Portuguese socialist leader Mário Soares formally invited the PLO to send an observer to the April 1983 congress of the Socialist International in Sydney. The passionately pro-Israel Australian Labour prime minister, Bob Hawke, strongly objected to the PLO's invitation; and the SI congress was hurriedly relocated to Albufeira, Portugal. Sartawi was selected by the PLO as its representative at this meeting in Portugal. Because the SI counted both the Israeli Labor Party and the PLO as members, it was hoped that such a meeting could promote the Middle East peace process.

On 10 April 1983, Sartawi was shot and killed in the lobby of the Montechoro Hotel in Albufeira, Portugal. The gunman, Yousef Al Awad, escaped. Later he was arrested by the Portuguese security forces. Sartawi's assassination (later claimed by the Abu Nidal Organization (ANO)) was witnessed by SI secretary-general, Bernt Carlsson, and was believed to have been carried out so as to frustrate Sartawi's efforts to make peace. Yousef Al Awad was released from prison in 1986 and met with Abu Nidal, leader of the ANO, at an undisclosed place.

Sartawi's funeral took place in Amman and was attended by all factions of the PLO – even including Abu Nidal Organization members (according to Maxim Ghilan, founder of the International Jewish Peace Union).

== Memorial ==
In 1998, the Issam Sartawi Center for the Advancement of Peace and Democracy (ISCAPD) was established at the Al-Quds University (the Arab University in Jerusalem) in memory of Sartawi.

In 1999, Portuguese author André Neves Bento wrote a detailed account of Issam Sartawi's assassination. During his investigations, Bento found transfers from a bank account in the name of Samir Najem A-Din, portrayed in the Western press as one of the leading PLO money men, from which account money was taken for a variety of purposes. On 13 March 1984, less than one year after Sartawi's assassination, for example, the owner of the account instructed the bank to transfer $17,000 to the Dafex arms factory in Portugal. A directive given by Najem A-din to the bank was also discovered, in which he ordered the monthly transfer of 10,000 pounds to the account of Amin Al-Banna, apparently the cousin of Abu Nidal. Al-Banna is suspected of involvement in the murder of Issam Sartawi, Arafat's political adviser.

== Personal life ==
Sartawi met Widad al-Mufti, who was daughter of the president of Iraq's Supreme Court, while they were both studying medicine at the University of Baghdad, which Sartawi commenced in 1954. They were married in 1963. Their daughter Nadia was born in January 1968.

== See also ==
- List of unsolved murders (1980–1999)

== Sources ==
- Avnery, Uri (1986). My Friend, The Enemy (1st ed.). London, UK: Zed Books. ISBN 0-86232-214-6.
- Gresh, Alain (1985). The PLO: The Struggle Within. London: Zed Books. ISBN 0-86232-272-3.
- Mendelsohn, Everett (June 2001). "The Peacemakers: NGO Efforts in the Middle East 1948-2001" (PDF). CDA Collaborative. Archived from the original (PDF) on 28 August 2025.
- Quandt, William B; Jabber, Fuad; Mosely Lesch, Ann (1973). The Politics of Palestinian Nationalism (Second ed.). Berkeley, Los Angeles, London: University of California Press. ISBN 0-520-02336-6.
- Sayigh, Yezid (1997). Armed Struggle and the Search for State. Oxford: Clarendon Press. ISBN 0-19-829265-1.
- Szyszkowitz, Tessa (2011). Der Friedenskämpfer: Arafats geheimer Gesandter Issam Sartawi [The Peace Fighter: Arafat's Secret Envoy, Issam Sartawi] (in German). Vienna: Picus. ISBN 978-3-85452-678-0.
