= Gundolf Köhler =

German far-right terrorist (1959-1980)

- Born: Gundolf Wilfried Köhler; 27 August 1959; Schwenningen am Neckar, Baden-Württemberg, West Germany
- Died: 26 September 1980 (aged 21); Munich, West Germany
- Cause of death: Bomb explosion
- Status: Deceased

Details
- Date: 26 September 1980; 10:19 p.m.
- Country: West Germany
- Location: Munich
- Target: Oktoberfest
- Killed: 13 (including himself)
- Injured: 213
- Weapon: Pipe bomb

Gundolf Köhler (27 August 1959 – 26 September 1980) was a German far-right terrorist who planted a bomb at the 1980 Oktoberfest in Munich, killing 13 people (including himself) and injuring more than 200 in what is known as the Oktoberfest bombing.

== Biography ==
Köhler was born on 27 August 1959 in Schwenningen, Baden-Württemberg; his mother was 40 at the time of his birth, and his father 55. His parents, Werner and Martha Köhler, had an agricultural business near Eilenburg in Saxony until they moved in 1952 to the small city of Donaueschingen, Baden-Württemberg. After their youngest child, Gerald, drowned in 1957 aged 5, the couple decided to have another child. They gave birth to Gundolf two years later.

At 14, Köhler participated in events of the NPD, a neo-Nazi party, and was a member of the Wiking-Jugend (Viking Youth). From 1975 onward, he took interest in paramilitary activities and established contacts with the Wehrsportgruppe Hoffmann (WSG Hoffman), a neo-Nazi far right anti-government militia. Köhler also started to experiment with chemicals, and he was severely injured in the face in an accidental explosion in 1975. The following year, he took part in violent confrontations led by the WSG Hoffman. Köhler participated twice in military exercises with the group. In 1978, Köhler asked Karl-Heinz Hoffmann for his support in establishing a WSG branch in Donaueschingen, but Hoffmann responded that a WSG group was already being set up in Tübingen.

Köhler earned his Abitur in 1978, then served for three months in the West German army. He attempted to be trained as an explosive expert but his project was eventually rejected due to a hearing disorder. In 1979, he began to study geology at the University of Tübingen, in Baden-Württemberg. Witnesses have reported that Köhler preferred to lock himself up in his basement to handle explosives rather than having fun with his peers. He was however not completely isolated at the university: Köhler played in a student's band and maintained contacts with the Tübingen University Students Circle (Hochschulring Tübinger Studenten), a right-wing student group known for brutal confrontations with leftist students.

After failing a university exam, Köhler moved back to his hometown, Donaueschingen, reportedly depressed and in emotional pain. He talked several times with two friends about a false flag bomb attack for which left-wing terrorist group would be blamed in the public opinion, thus increasing public support for right-wing parties in the 1980 federal election. Prosecutors could not prove however their implication in the terrorist plot.

== Oktoberfest bombing ==
Köhler planted an improvised explosive device in a dustbin on 26 September 1980, near one of the entrances to the Oktoberfest; it exploded at 22:19, killing 13 and injuring over 200. The bomb exploded prematurely and Köhler was instantly killed in the attack. The investigation has concluded that he was the sole perpetrator of the attack, but doubts remain as to whether he acted alone.

In 2020, a senior investigator told Süddeutsche Zeitung that "the perpetrator acted out of a right-wing extremist motive ... Gundolf Köhler wanted to influence the 1980 parliamentary election. He strived for a dictatorial state in the image of national socialism." A portrait of Adolf Hitler was found hanging above his bed after the attack.

== See also ==
- List of rampage killers
- Terrorism in Germany
