= Melvin Goodman =

American national security and intelligence expert

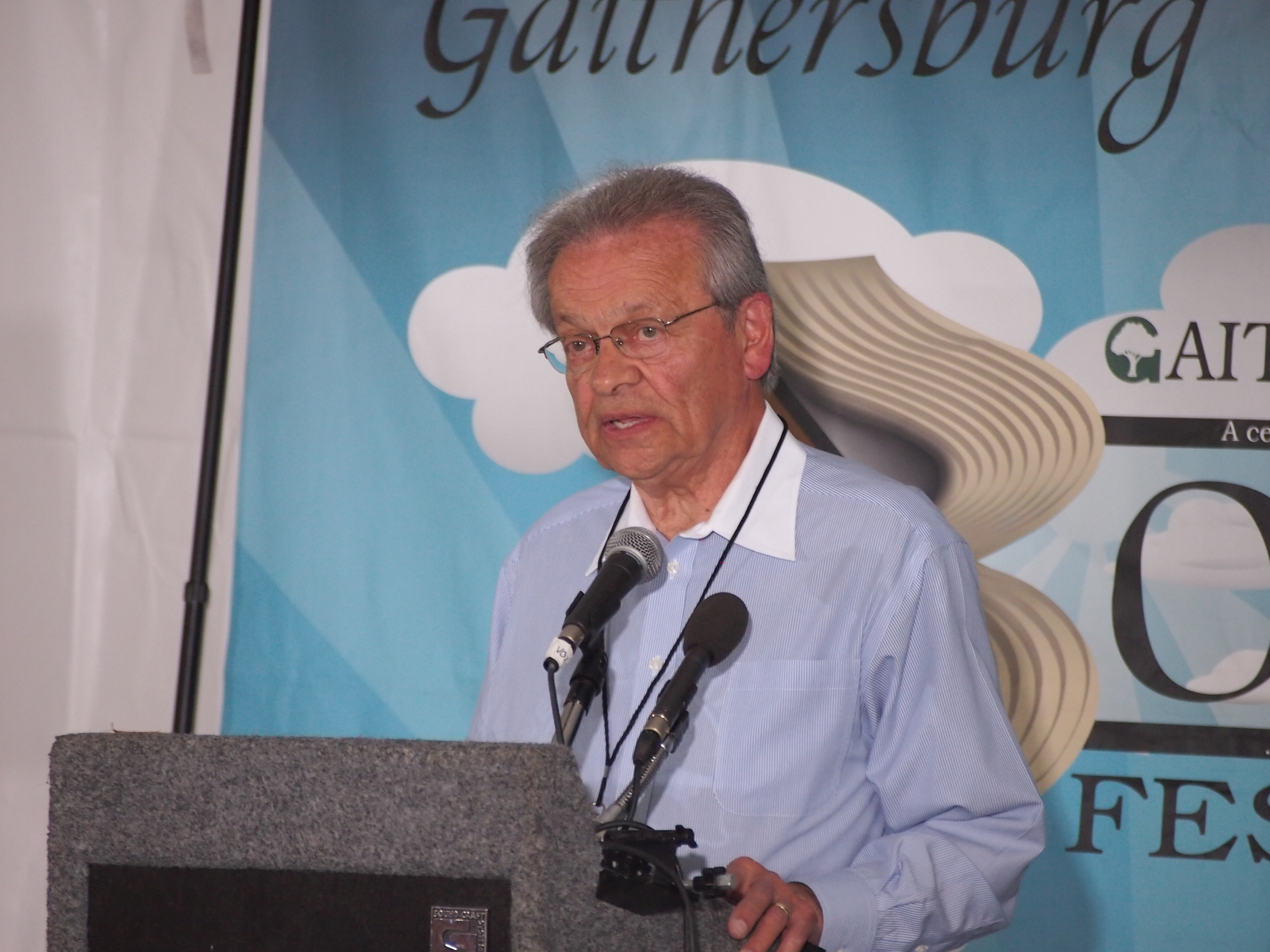
Goodman in 2017

Melvin Allan "Mel" Goodman is a national security and intelligence expert. He has worked as an analyst for the Central Intelligence Agency (CIA) and the State Department, taught at the National War College and Johns Hopkins University, and is a senior fellow at the Center for International Policy.

== Career ==
Goodman's career in intelligence began in the U.S. Army where he worked as cryptographer. He then worked as an analyst at the Central Intelligence Agency, from 1966 to 1974. He transferred to the Bureau of Intelligence and Research in 1974, where he spent the next two years working as a senior analyst. He returned to the Central Intelligence Agency in 1976, and served as the division chief and senior analyst at the Office of Soviet Affairs until leaving in 1986.

He also served as an intelligence adviser to the Strategic Arms Limitation Talks.

He went on to teach at the National War College as a professor of international security, from 1986 through 2004. He is currently an adjunct professor at Johns Hopkins University, and a senior fellow at the Center for International Policy.

== Works ==
- Carolyn McGiffert Ekedahl; Melvin Allan Goodman (1997). The wars of Eduard Shevardnadze. Penn State Press. ISBN 978-0-271-03906-0.
- The Phantom Defense, America's Pursuit of the Star Wars Illusion. Greenwood Publishing Group. 2001. ISBN 978-0-275-97183-0.
- Bush League Diplomacy: How the Neoconservatives are Putting the World at Risk. Prometheus Books. 2004. ISBN 978-1-61614-000-7.
- Failure of Intelligence: the Decline and Fall of the CIA. Rowman & Littlefield. 2008. ISBN 978-0-7425-5110-7. "melvin goodman."
- National Insecurity: The Cost of American Militarism. City Lights Books. 2013. ISBN 978-0-87286-589-1.
- Whistleblower at the CIA. An Insiders Account of the Politics of Intelligence. City Lights Books. 2016. ISBN 9780872867307
