= Oktoberfest bombing =

1980 neo-Nazi terrorist attack in Munich, West Germany

Coordinates: 48°08′09″N 11°32′59″E

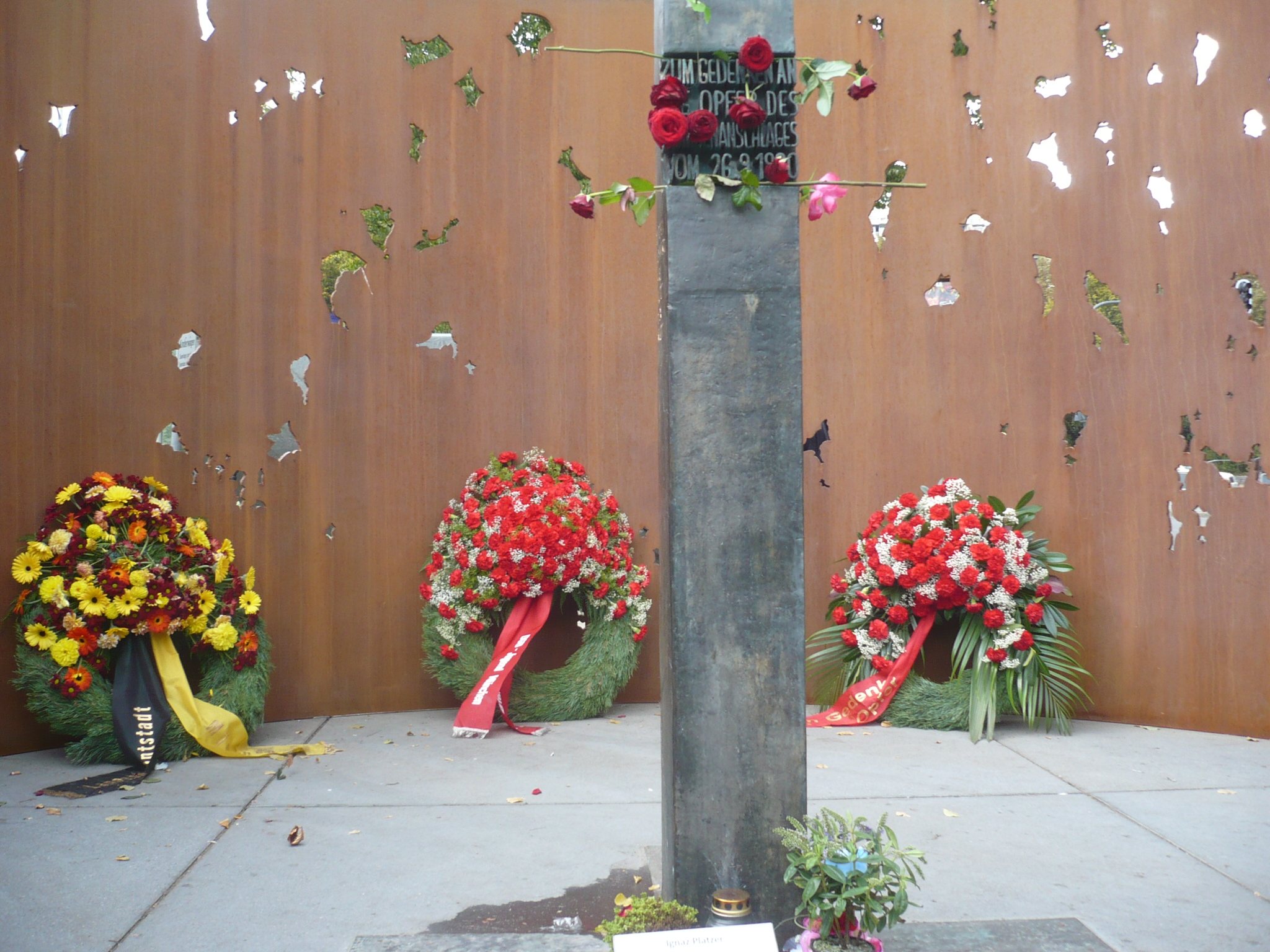
- Monument at the site (2008)
- Location: Munich, West Germany
- Date: 26 September 1980
- Target: Oktoberfest participants
- Attack type: Bombing, mass murder, terrorism
- Weapon: Pipe bomb
- Deaths: 13 (including the perpetrator)
- Injuries: 213
- Perpetrators: Gundolf Köhler; Other unknown accomplices (alleged)
- Motive: neo-Nazism

The Oktoberfest bombing (German: Oktoberfest-Attentat) was a far-right terrorist attack. On 26 September 1980, 13 people were killed (including the perpetrator) and more than 200 injured by the explosion of an improvised explosive device (IED) at the main entrance of the Oktoberfest festival in Munich, West Germany. The bombing was attributed to the right-wing extremist and geology student Gundolf Köhler, who was instantly killed in the attack as the bomb exploded prematurely.

Prior to the bombing, Köhler had been involved with the banned neo-Nazi militia Wehrsportgruppe Hoffmann, and doubts remain as to whether he acted alone. A federal investigation concluded in 2020 that the participation of accomplices or backers in the bombing could not be proven beyond reasonable doubt, although it still could not be precluded.

Excluding the perpetrators, the attack was one of the deadliest in Germany since World War II after the 2016 Berlin truck attack, and along with the 1972 Munich massacre, and the deadliest perpetrated by a follower of Nazism in the country since 1945.

== Attack ==
The Oktoberfest is an outdoor beer festival in Munich, Germany, held during a 16-day period running from late September to the first weekend in October.

At 10:19 p.m. on 26 September 1980, a bomb exploded in a rubbish bin near the main entrance to the Oktoberfest, killing seven people instantly; five others died of their injuries and a further 213 survivors were registered as injured, many of whom lost limbs in the blast. Gundolf Köhler, the perpetrator, was also instantly killed in the attack as the bomb exploded prematurely.

The crime scene was rapidly cleaned up and the festival reopened less than twelve hours after the attack. The then mayor of Munich, Erich Kiesl, said: "Neither this State, nor this city or its citizens will be held to ransom by criminals. A closure would only support the condemnable intention of the perpetrator. For this reason we must say: life must go on."

The investigation revealed that the improvised explosive device was made of an emptied British mortar grenade into which military explosives and a gas bottle taken from a fire extinguisher had been inserted. A computer-generated reconstruction of the crime scene just before the attack, created with the help of survivors' testimonies for a second investigation in the 2010s, shows Köhler alone with a heavy plastic bag, leaning over a metal dustbin seconds before the explosion.

== Investigations ==
=== 1980 investigation ===
The perpetrator, geology student Gundolf Köhler, had just failed an exam and was described as an emotionally tormented person with relationship problems. Close to radical right-wing circles, Köhler had trained twice with the Wehrsportgruppe Hoffmann, a neo-Nazi militia; a picture of Adolf Hitler was found hanging over his bed after the attack. However, during the initial Bavarian investigation led by the LKA, the crime was not regarded as politically inspired, and Köhler's motives were deemed to be primarily personal by the Federal Prosecution at the time. The Federal Public Prosecutor General terminated its investigation in November 1982.

In 1997, as the case was considered closed, the evidence collected by the "Theresienwiese Special Commission" were destroyed, including the fragments of the bomb, as well as the remains of a hand that could not be linked to any of the victims and which was therefore considered to be a clue to a possible second perpetrator. 48 cigarette butts found in February 1981 in Köhler's car were also destroyed before DNA analysis could have linked them to any suspect.

=== Possibility of accomplices ===
Several elements have raised doubts among representatives of victims and some politicians regarding the conclusions of the 1980 investigations, particularly against the motive of the terrorist and the official theory of the lone wolf attack. According to three or four witnesses, Köhler had a heated discussion with two short-haired men wearing green Bundeswehr parkas around half an hour before the explosion; the two men were never found.

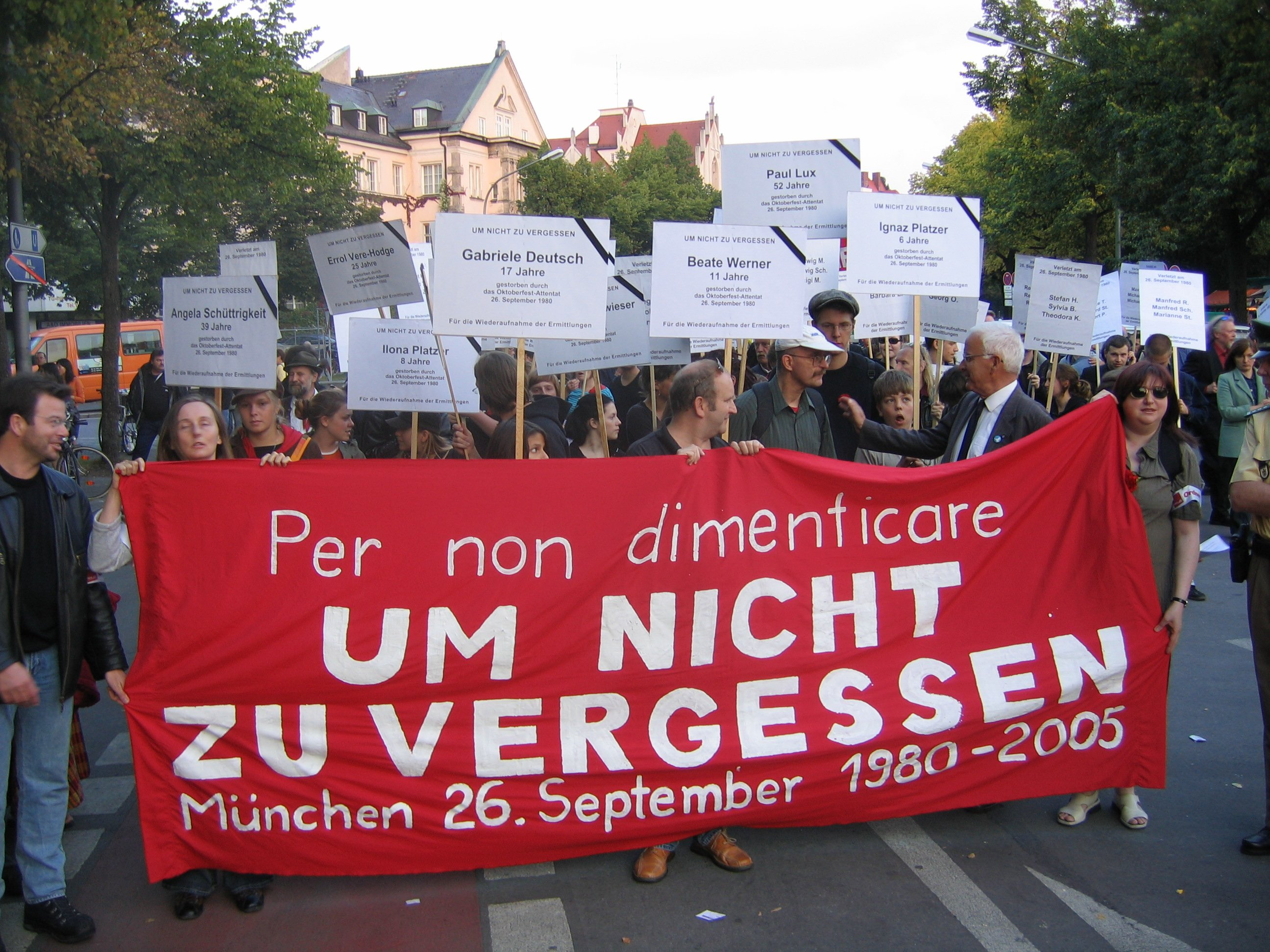
Commemorations 25 years after the Oktoberfest bombing. Munich, 2005.

Köhler was allegedly holding a small suitcase during the attack, which has been seen laying a few meters from the trashcan by some witness, but no trace of such an item was found by the police. A passerby mentioned that she saw two young men standing near Köhler's lifeless body, one of them yelling "I didn't want it! It's not my fault! Just kill me!". The man was never questioned. One week prior the attack, another woman saw a car with 5 persons near the entrance to the Oktoberfest, reportedly with a large concealed object wrapped on the back seat. The license plate of the vehicle led the investigators to Köhler's father. Although Köhler's parents were away that weekend, Köhler's mother convincingly told the police that her son was home at the time.

One member of the Wehrsportgruppe Hoffmann later accused himself of having been present during the attack just before taking his own life, and another member of the group boasted in a bar that he was there during the "Munich action". Two state secretaries of the Federal Ministry of the Interior additionally stated that the attack "was orchestrated by right-wing extremist circles". However, the suspects could not be proven to have participated in the crime.

=== 2014 investigation ===
The case was reopened in December 2014 after years of a public campaign led by relatives, victim representatives, lawyers, journalists and politicians. In 2020, the investigation revised the initial conclusions regarding Köhler's motives. A senior investigator told Süddeutsche Zeitung that "the perpetrator acted out of a right-wing extremist motive ... Gundolf Köhler wanted to influence the 1980 federal election. He strived for a dictatorial state in the image of national socialism." The federal election occurred only 9 days after the bombing and saw the reelection of Social Democrat Chancellor Helmut Schmidt.

Prior to the attacks, Köhler had reportedly talked several times with two friends about a false flag bomb attack for which the Red Army Faction or another left-wing terrorist group would be blamed, thus increasing public support for right-wing parties in the election. One of the two friends told his lawyer that Köhler had shown him the grenade from which the bomb was made before the crime occurred, although investigators could not find evidence of their implication beyond mere knowledge of a possible terrorist plot. Despite the interrogation of some 1,008 witnesses and survivors, along with the extensive review of 300,000 documents from national authorities, including radical right-wing records from the 1970s, the federal prosecutor's office concluded in 2020 that "there were not sufficient indications for the involvement of other people either as accomplices, instigators or helpers", but that the hypothesis "[could] be ruled out".

== In popular culture ==
In 2009, German novelist Wolfgang Schorlau published a book about the event, entitled Das München-Komplott ("The Munich plot").

In 2013, the feature film Der blinde Fleck ("The blind spot") was released to German cinemas, starring Benno Fürmann in the lead and concerning a dramatized event of journalist Ulrich Chaussy's investigations throughout the 1980s regarding the Oktoberfest bombing and possible political cover-ups of a radical right-wing network behind it.

The 1988 album What Good Is Grief to a God? by D.I. includes the event in a list of terrorist actions in the song "Terrorist's Life".
