= Rote Zora (group) =

West German Radical Feminist Group

- Logo of the Rote Zora
- Dates active: 1974 – 1995
- Split from: Revolutionary Cells
- Active regions: West Germany
- Ideology: Autonomism; Feminism; New Left; Radical feminism
- Status: Inactive

Rote Zora (English: Red Zora) was a West German radical left feminist urban guerrilla organization active from 1974 to 1995. The group committed a series of bombing and arson attacks against ideological enemies, including individuals and organizations thought to be involved with sexism, the exploitation of women, genetic engineering, enforcing patriarchal society, nuclear power, and anti-abortionism. Rote Zora were particularly opposed to Section 218 of the German Penal Law limiting abortion, which they referred to as the "Terrorism Paragraph". The organization never officially dissolved, but was completely inactive by 1996.

== History ==
=== Revolutionary Cells ===
Rote Zora began in 1977 as the autonomous feminist arm of the Revolutionary Cells, a major radical left terrorist organisation in West Germany, which saw itself as a rival to the more prominent Red Army Faction. The organization took its name from the protagonist of the 1941 book Die Rote Zora und ihre Bande (English title: The Outsiders of Uskoken Castle) by Kurt Held, which tells the story of a red-haired girl named Rote Zora (rot meaning red in German) who leads a gang of orphans committed to righting injustice.

The organization had previously existed from 1974 as "Women of the Revolutionary Cells" and began its attacks in 1975, with a bombing of the building of the Federal Constitutional Court in Karlsruhe, and in 1977 with a bombing outside the offices of the German Medical Association, both of which were to protest against support for anti-abortion laws. In 1978, Rote Zora committed arson attacks against sex shops in Cologne. In 1980, they set fire to the car of a lawyer in Bergisch Gladbach, near Cologne, to protest gentrification. In 1981, they distributed fake local public transport tickets in the Ruhr area together with the Revolutionary Cells. In 1983, Rote Zora carried out attacks against property linked to trafficking and forced prostitution (including marriage brokers and a sex shop), a bomb attack on the Philippine embassy in Bonn, bomb attacks against Siemens in Braunschweig and Witten, Attacks on the Nixdorf Computer in Hanover, and the data center of the Association of Clubs Creditreform in Neuss. In 1984, they committed an arson attack on two companies in Gütersloh who were accused of using prison labor for private profit. In 1985, attacks were committed on the Max Planck Institute for Plant Breeding Research in Cologne, a medical institute of the University of Heidelberg, and the Institute of Genetics of the University of Cologne.

=== Split ===
In 1986, Rote Zora split from the Revolutionary Cells, having become disillusioned with the violent methods of other left-wing groups that had resulted in deaths. Although there was still significant overlap in membership, Rote Zora launched a separate campaign that was intended not to harm. Their first attack as an independent organization was an arson attack against the Institute of Human Genetics at the University of Münster, where sensitive documents were also stolen from the institute and published. The same year they committed a bombing attack on the Society for Biotechnological Research in Braunschweig. In 1987, Rote Zora committed ten arson attacks against the clothing chain Alder, including their headquarters in Haibach, and at branches in Halstenbek, Bremen, Oldenburg, Isernhagen, Kassel, Holzwickede, Neuss, Frankfurt and Aachen. In 1988, they committed a bombing attack at the Biological Institute of Technische Universität Berlin. In 1994, they committed an arson attack on a company supplying food to refugee shelters in Nuremberg and Gera.

Rote Zora carried out its last known attack in July 1995, when it bombed the shipyard of Lürssen GmbH in the Vegesack district of Bremen, in support of the Kurds in the Kurdish–Turkish conflict. Lürssen was manufacturing a ship for Turkey, and was accused by the group of being armaments suppliers for the Turkish regime, which leads a war against the Kurds.

== Demise ==
Following the Bremen shipyard bombing, Rote Zora had become inactive but had never officially dissolved. The group had begun to splinter in the early 1990s, following the dissolution of the Soviet Union and a general decline in far-left militant activity, as some members wished to give up armed struggle, while others wished to continue it. Rote Zora's activists were part-time guerillas, and were known as "after-work terrorists" because most had middle class jobs and carried out their attacks in their free time.

In 2000, a short documentary about the group, Die Rote Zora, was made by Oliver Ressler.

In April 2007, former Rote Zora member Adrienne Gershäuser stood trial for the attempted bombings of the Berlin Genetic Technical Institute in 1986, and a clothing factory in Bavaria in 1987, receiving a suspended two-year sentence, due to the time lapse and because she turned herself in, stated the authorities. The maximum penalty Gershäuser could have faced would have been ten years in jail for being a member of a terrorist group.

== See also ==
- Radical feminism
- Anti-Imperialist Cell
