= Militante gruppe =

Far-left militant organisation in Germany

The militante gruppe (mg) was a far-left militant organisation in Germany, that came to attention from 2001. It defined itself as "anti-imperialist" and communist. It was accused of carrying out arson attacks in Berlin, Brandenburg and Saxony-Anhalt. The group was reported to be dissolved in July 2009.
