= Embassy of Israel, Bonn =

Embassy of the State of Israel in West Germany שגרירות מדינת ישראל טהראן
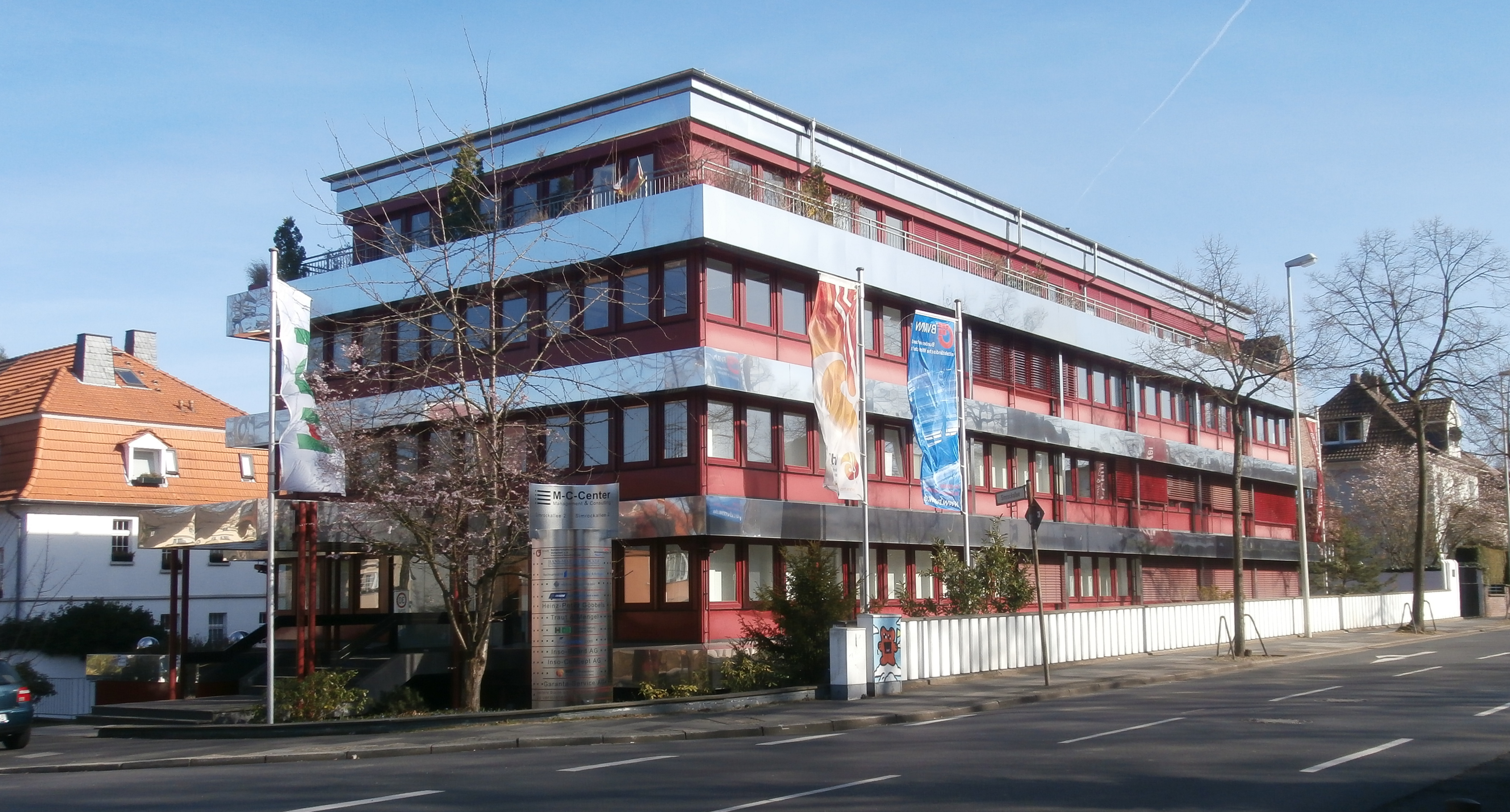
- Location: Bonn, North Rhine-Westphalia, Germany
- Address: Bad Godesberg
- Opening: 1966
- Closed: 1999

The Embassy of the State of Israel in the Federal Republic of Germany was the diplomatic mission of Israel in West Germany. It was located in Bonn, North Rhine-Westphalia, in the Bad Godesberg district of the city.

== History ==
Prior to the establishment of diplomatic relations between the Federal Republic of Germany and Israel, on 12 May 1965, the state's sole representation in the Federal Republic was the Israel Mission (1953–1966) in Cologne, a "trade mission" subordinate to the Israeli Ministry of Finance for the settlement of German reparations under the Luxembourg Agreement (1952). The head of the mission, Felix Eliezer Shinnar, held his office with the rank of ambassador. After lengthy negotiations with the Federal Republic of Germany, the mission was also able to lead a consular department subordinate to the Israeli Foreign Ministry.

After establishing diplomatic relations, Israel opened an embassy in Bonn in August 1965; the first Israeli ambassador was accredited on 24 August. The embassy's chancellery was initially set up in the property of the Israel Mission in the Cologne district of Ehrenfeld. In 1966, it moved to Bad Godesberg, the geographical focus of the diplomatic missions, to an office building in the Godesberg-Villenviertel district.

When the Israeli government began to adjust to a longer presence at the seat of government in Bonn, it planned to build the new embassy chancellery in Bad Godesberg.
