= Anti-Imperialist Cell =

German far-left militant organization

- Dates active: 1992–1995
- Active regions: Germany
- Ideology: Anti-Imperialism; Anti-Fascism; Communism
- Status: Inactive

The Anti-Imperialist Cell (German: Antiimperialistische Zelle, AIZ) was a German far-left militant organization responsible for several terrorist attacks from 1992 to 1995. The AIZ began its existence on 22 May 1992, branding itself as the successor to the inactive Red Army Faction. They published their first communiqué in 1994, with the stated mission to attack "elites" of reunified Germany and their representatives at their jobs or residences. The organization committed nine bombing, shooting and arson attacks against German state and political right-wing targets, ultimately resulting in no deaths.

On 25 February 1996, Bernhard Falk and Michael Steinau were arrested for involvement in the activities of the AIZ, and on 1 September 1999, were convicted by the Higher Regional Court of Düsseldorf for four counts of attempted murder, receiving sentences of 9 and 13 years imprisonment, respectively. Falk and Steinau are the only known members of the AIZ, which investigators assumed had a larger membership, and are presumed to be the only members as attacks by the organization ended immediately after their arrest.

== List of attacks by the Anti-Imperialist Cell ==
- 21 November 1992 - Arson attack on the law faculty of the University of Hamburg.
- 18 August 1993 - Arson attack on the home of a GSG-9 member in Solingen.
- 17 November 1993 - Firearms attack on the headquarters of the employers' association Gesamtmetall in Cologne.
- 5 July 1994 - Explosive bomb attack on the office of the CDU in Düsseldorf.
- 24/26 September 1994 - Attempted bomb attack on the building of the regional office of the Free Democratic Party in Bremen.
- 22 January 1995 - Explosive attack against the home of CDU politician Volkmar Köhler, the former Bundestag state secretary for the BMZ, in Wolfsburg.
- 23 April 1995 - Explosive attack on the home of the CDU politician Joseph-Theodor Blank, the Bundestag MP for Mettmann I, in Erkrath.
- 17 September 1995 - Explosive bomb attack on the residential building of the CDU politician Paul Breuer, Bundestag MP for Siegen-Wittgenstein, in Siegen.
- 23 December 1995 - Explosive bomb attack on the consulate of Peru in Düsseldorf.

== See also ==
- Communist terrorism
- Red Army Faction
- Rote Zora

== Sources ==
- Bureau of Democracy, Human Rights, and Labor Germany: Country Reports on Human Rights Practices - 2000 U.S. State Department. 23 February 2001.
