= Carolyn Ekedahl =

American political writer

Carolyn McGiffert Ekedahl was an Assistant inspector general for Inspections at the Central Intelligence Agency from 2001 until 2005. She had previously served as Deputy Assistant IG from 1997-2001. From 1962-1985, she served as an analyst at the CIA, working on Soviet foreign policy.

In 1972 she authored a study on Finland's relationship with the Soviet Union. In 1981 she was handed the assignment to gather analysis on the Soviet Union’s alleged support and direction of international terrorism. Her assessment was that the Soviets considered international terrorist activities counterproductive and advised groups they supported not to use such tactics.

From 1983 to 1984 she served as a Senior Fellow of the Atlantic Council of the United States.

In 1991 she testified against Robert Gates at his confirmation hearings by the U.S. Senate Select Committee on Intelligence on charges of politicization of intelligence data.

She has published two books on Soviet leaders. Her co-author on her latest book, Melvin A. Goodman, was also a senior analyst as well as division chief and at the CIA's Office of Soviet Affairs from 1976 to 1986.

She currently writes political poems.

In the 2024 United States presidential election, Ekedahl endorsed Kamala Harris.

== Publications ==
- Moscow and the Third World Under Gorbachev, with W. Raymond Duncan 1990 ISBN 978-0-8133-1052-7
- The Wars of Edvard Shevardnadze, with Melvin Goodman 1997 ISBN 978-0-271-01604-7
