= 1991 Holzminden ambush =

Attack against police officers in Rottmündetal forest car park

- Location: Holzminden, Germany
- Date: 12 October 1991; 02:30 (UTC+1)
- Target: Holzminden police officers
- Attack type: Ambush, shooting
- Deaths: 2
- Injuries: 0
- Perpetrator: Action Group for the Destruction of the Police State

On 12 October 1991, two Lower Saxony police officers were ambushed at a forest parking lot in Solling near Boffzenstenmord von Holzminden. After an extensive search, the two perpetrators were arrested four days later. The murder of the two police officers and the long-lasting court case attracted nationwide attention.

== Attack ==
On 12 October 1991 at 2:29 a.m., the police in Höxter, North Rhine-Westphalia, received a call from the emergency call box at the Rottmündetal forest car park on State Road 549 between Neuhaus im Solling and Boffzen:

"Uh, good day, my name is Meier. I had an, uh, accident with a wildlife. Could you send someone over? Nobody was hurt, it's just a little bit on the bumper."

For the police officer who took the call, the operation seemed like a small matter. He informed his colleague in Holzminden, Lower Saxony, because the location of the alleged wildlife accident fell within their area of responsibility.

The two police sergeants Andreas Wilkending from Holzminden and Jörg Lorkowski from Lüchtringen who had just taken a driver to the hospital for a blood alcohol test, received the report a few minutes later; they drove to the remote parking lot in their civilian patrol car, a maroon Volkswagen Passat. Contact with the officers ended there.

Around one and a half hours after the last contact, the concerned operations manager ordered another patrol car to the forest parking lot. The patrol officers initially found no trace of their colleagues there; when they illuminated the area, they saw blood stains, brain matter, tooth and bone fragments, and cartridge cases of the caliber 7,62 × 51 mm.

At around 10 a.m. on the same day, a hunter found the murdered officers' patrol car burned out and riddled with bullet holes on the Sennelager Training Area. The two police officers remained missing; one of the largest search operations in post-war German history began: up to 6,000 people from three federal states searched for them; divers searched the Weser near the crime scene.

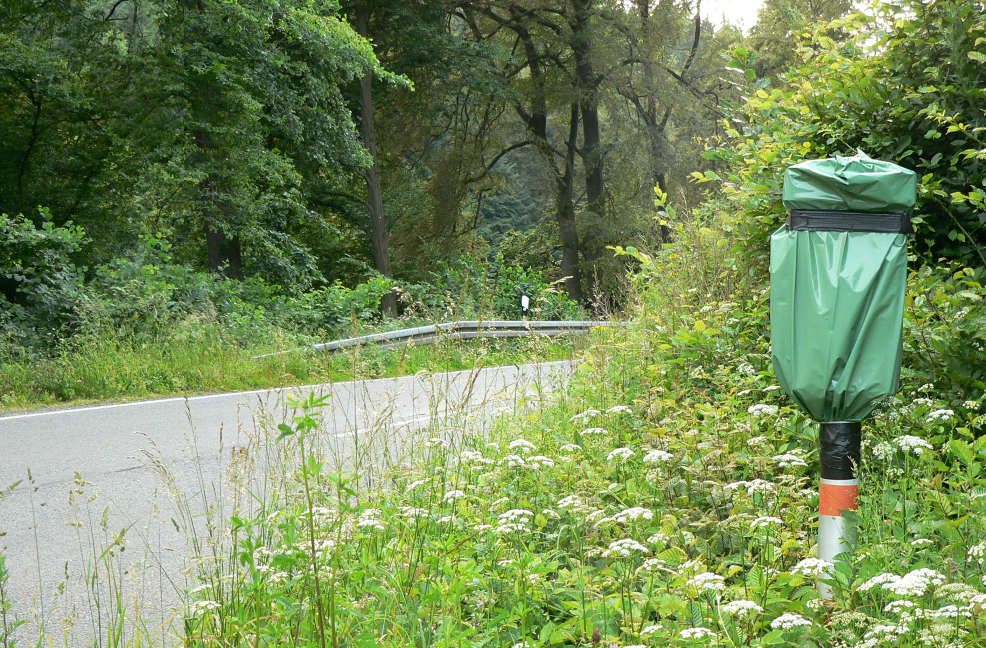
Covered Emergency phone call box, 2014

== Investigation and arrest ==
In addition to the normal police search, a telephone number was set up where the call from "Mr. Meier" could be listened to. The telephone message, prepared by the Federal Criminal Police Office's forensic institute, brought hundreds of tips from the public. A resident in the perpetrators' neighborhood recognized the voice; the reward of 50,000 DM offered did not persuade him to inform the police due to security concerns. Most of the consistent tips based on the audio recording came from prisoners and prison officers at the Bielefeld-Brackwede correctional facility. They identified the caller as Dietmar Jüschke, then 29 years old, who had been released early from a ten-month prison sentence a few weeks earlier for good behavior. Dietmar was a lover of hunting, but his misconduct led him to clash with the local police, who revoked his hunting license. He was convicted for petty crime on several occasions on charges of poaching, illegal possession of arms and vandalism.

Four days after the crime, on October 16, 1991, at around 9:30 p.m., a special task force of the Bielefeld police stormed a house in Bredenborn in the Höxter district, where Dietmar Jüschke and his two brothers were staying. While Dietmar and the youngest of the three brothers, Ludwig, were easily overpowered, Manfred tried to take his own life by stabbing himself twice in the chest with a hunting knife and twice in the neck with a fixed boot knife.

In a cavity under the attic of the house, several types of ammunition, two submachine guns, and the G3 assault rifle (212252 Bw1/63) with telescopic sight were found. Later, the police officer's service weapons and large quantities of ammunition were also found in an underground depot near the home.

About a week after the crime, Dietmar Jüschke confessed. His 25-year-old brother Ludwig had previously incriminated him in a confession. On the night of October 18, Dietmar Jüschke led the police to the hiding place in a forest in the northeast of the Senne military training area, where the bodies of the two police officers were buried at the beginning of a densely overgrown coniferous forest. The two had been murdered immediately after arriving at the parking lot with 13 shots from the G3 assault rifle from a distance of less than seven meters. They each left behind a wife and two children.

== Court proceedings and investigations into previous crimes ==
=== Court proceedings ===
The case was heard before the jury chamber of the Hildesheim Regional Court. The trial lasted 180 days, during which the six defense lawyers called almost 100 police officers who were involved in the raid. During the trial, Manfred strongly implicated his older brother Dietmar as the main perpetrator, while Ludwig became entangled in contradictions and his involvement in the crime could later no longer be proven. Around two and a half years after the trial began, the verdict was announced on February 21, 1995. The main defendant, Dietmar Jüschke, was sentenced to life imprisonment for two counts of murder. In addition, the court found that the guilt was particularly serious particularly serious and ordered subsequent preventive detention. According to the Hildesheim Regional Court, the perpetrator's motive was "general hatred of the police".

Manfred Jüschke was sentenced to ten years in prison for aiding and abetting murder and aiding and abetting aggravated robbery. Ludwig Jüschke was acquitted of the charge of aiding and abetting murder for lack of evidence but received a two-year prison sentence on probation for aiding and abetting aggravated robbery for his involvement in the raid on the Bundeswehr barracks. Ludwig Jüschke was acquitted of the charge of aiding and abetting murder due to a lack of evidence but received a two-year suspended prison sentence for aiding and abetting aggravated robbery for his involvement in the attack on the Bundeswehr barracks.

Yeats later, Manfred Jüschke and Ludwig Jüschke live under new names in the Höxter district.

=== Term of imprisonment ===
In 2010, the criminal execution chamber of the Regional Court of Lüneburg based in Celle set the minimum sentence for Dietmar Jüschke at 25 years. In 2018, the minimum sentence of 25 years expired and the Göttingen criminal execution chamber considered early release. The court rejected it because the conditions for it were not met. At the beginning of 2020, Dietmar Jüschke refused a legally required detention review.

In August 2020, he applied for release from custody, which the Hildesheim public prosecutor's office, as the law enforcement authority, opposed. The final decision on release was made by the Lüneburg Regional Court after obtaining an expert opinion. The release depended on whether the convicted person continued to pose a danger. In August 2020, he applied for release from custody, which the Hildesheim public prosecutor's office, as the law enforcement authority, opposed. The final decision on release was made by the Lüneburg regional court after obtaining an expert opinion. The release depended on the dangerousness.

In 2016 it became known that Dietmar Jüschke was incarcerated in the Rosdorf Correctional Facility. In 2020 he was imprisoned in the Celle Correctional Facility. Dietmar Jüschke was originally supposed to be released from prison on probation in July 2024. The Lüneburg Regional Court initially postponed his release due to a lack of a residential address after his prison sentence.

With appropriate proof, he was released from prison at the beginning of August 2024.

=== More information on the background of the crime ===
In 2016, a police officer who was investigating at the time and is now retired commented on the case. He believes the public portrayal of the crime is wrong, as he believes the motive for the crime was not the "general hatred of police officers" that is spread in the media. According to his knowledge, which is based on the questioning of his younger brother Ludwig, Dietmar Jüschke developed a hatred for a certain police officer who had investigated him for a series of crimes and who had bullied him. Dietmar Jüschke had made a plan to take revenge on him. They took inspiration for this was the television series The A-Team. The ambush was intended to capture a service weapon to make the planned murder of the police officer appear to be a suicide. This view of the background to the crime is not shared by those involved at the time from the judiciary and authorities.

== Previous crimes at military facilities ==
=== Robbery an ammunition depot in Rommel barracks in Augustdorf, 1986 ===
The brothers were also accused of an assault on the Generalfeldmarschall-Rommel-Kaserne (Augustdorf) on Sunday, December 21, 1986. There they gained access to an ammunition depot and stole two wooden boxes with a total of 3,600 rounds of ammunition, including 800 rounds of rifle ammunition caliber 7.62 × 51 mm and 2,500 rounds of 9×19mm Parabellum cartridges for submachine guns.

=== Theft at the Senne military training area in 1987 ===
On Sunday, April 5, 1987, soldiers from a Dutch tank company who were in bivouac were attacked at the Senne military training area, which is used by British soldiers. In a 10-man tent, a sleeping soldier's Uzi submachine gun that was nearby was stolen. In a parked military jeep, the perpetrators also stole two duffel bags with various items of equipment, including the steel helmet of the Dutch soldier Hamersma.

== Robbery of a Bundeswehr patrol in Augustdorf in 1988 ==
On Saturday, April 19, 1988, two German army soldiers were on patrol near the military base (StOV) in Augustdorf. At 2 a.m., two perpetrators entered the military base and ambushed the two patrol guards at the crossing between the military base and the barracks. A firefight ensued, in which the two perpetrators also used an Uzi submachine gun. Despite targeted shots from the guards, the two perpetrators managed to escape. When comparing the projectiles in 1988, it was determined that the same Uzi was fired during the attack on the Yorck barracks.

=== Attack on the Yorck barracks in Stadtoldendorf in 1988 ===
The murder weapon was stolen during the nighttime robbery on a Bundeswehr patrol in the Yorck barracks in Stadtoldendorf on Sunday, 15 May 1988. A metal fence was cut, a guard was knocked down with a club, and his service weapon, a G3 Heckler & Koch rifle was stolen. The second guard of the 15th Panzer Artillery Battalion fired a warning shot, whereupon the perpetrators fired back with an Uzi submachine gun. This led to further investigations into previous crimes at military bases, in one case of which the Uzi submachine gun used was also fired at soldiers in April 1988.

The Holzminden Criminal Investigation Department and the Detmold Criminal Investigation Department under the leadership of Chief Inspector Udo Golabeck investigated and the ZDF television program "Aktenzeichen XY ... ungelöst" showed the criminal case on 10 February 1989. A reward of 5,000 DM for information leading to the arrest of the perpetrators did not lead to any investigation success.

== Inheritance dispute between the brothers ==
In June 2003, Dietmar, who was in prison, sued his youngest brother Ludwig for the statutory share of his father's estate. Dietmar Jüschke had been disinherited by his father after his crime. Since Manfred voluntarily renounced his inheritance (renunciation of inheritance), Ludwig was the only heir. The Paderborn Regional Court upheld the lawsuit.

== Commemoration for the victims ==
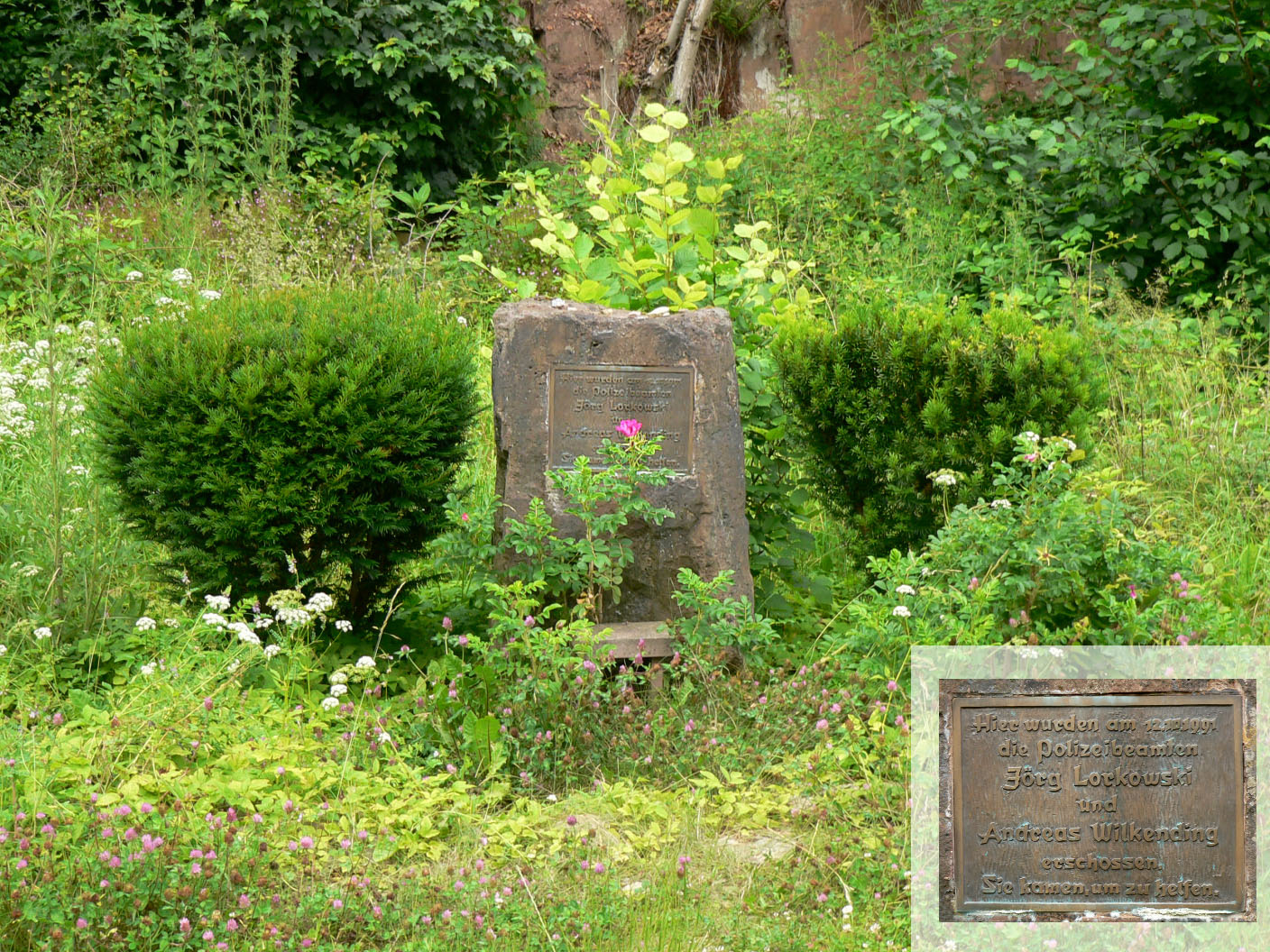
Memorial stone for the murdered police officers at the crime scene in the Rottmündetal forest car park, 2014

A memorial stone was erected at the crime scene to commemorate the two victims. In the Holzminden police building, a stone plaque commemorates the events and the officers killed. On the 25th anniversary of the crime in 2016, police officers and family members of the two murdered police officers in Holzminden commemorated their murdered colleagues and relatives with a private ceremony. On Remembrance Day in November 2019, unknown persons smeared the memorial stone with white paint.
