= Rogers Plan =

1969 Arab–Israeli war resolution proposal

The Rogers Plan (also known as Deep Strike) was a framework proposed by United States Secretary of State William P. Rogers to achieve an end to belligerence in the Arab–Israeli conflict following the Six-Day War and the continuing War of Attrition.

== History ==
The Rogers Plan was publicly proposed in a December 9, 1969 speech at an Adult Education conference.

The December 1969 speech followed the failure of the Jarring Mission to negotiate an implementation plan for UN Security Council Resolution 242 among the principals in the Six-Day War.

Some of the points included in Rogers' ten-point paper called for the following:

- Negotiations under Gunnar Jarring's auspices following procedures used in the 1949 meetings on Rhodes;
- Israeli withdrawal from Egyptian territory occupied in the war;
- A binding commitment by Israel and Egypt to maintain peace with each other
- Negotiations between Israel and Egypt for agreement on areas to be demilitarized, measures to guarantee free passage through the Gulf of Aqaba, and security arrangements for Gaza;

Failure of the Jarring Mission and the mediated peace talks reflected a long-standing stalemate between Israel and Egypt. Whereas Israel demanded a formal recognition of its sovereignty, gained via direct peace talks with Egypt, Egypt would only agree to offer a peace sponsored by the third-party United Nations (this would allow Egypt to avoid political fallout from the Arab nations, which were strongly opposed to recognition of Israel). In addition to this peace, Israel would return all land to Egypt. Both parties viewed the conflicting interests as a stalemate only to be resolved via military intimidation. Whereas the US government view hoped to use promises of arms to gain Israeli concessions on land, Israel desired arms to secure the land it refused to give up.

Negotiations leading up to Rogers' plan were complicated not only by hostilities between Israel and Egypt, but also by the differing philosophies adopted by the Soviet Union and the United States in approaching the negotiations. Soviet strategy during the peace talks had been to "bring the Egyptians with them every step of the way. American strategy was wholly different. There was never any question of trying to persuade the Israelis to endorse each American move as it was made. To secure Israel's agreement the Americans calculated that they would first have to have that of Egypt and the Soviet Union".

Israel rejected the plan on December 10, 1969, calling it "an attempt to appease [the Arabs] at the expense of Israel. The Soviets dismissed it as "one-sided" and "pro-Israeli." President Nasser rejected it because it was a separate deal with Israel even if Egypt recovered all of Sinai.

== The Six-Day War (1967) and the War of Attrition (1967–1970) ==
In an unsuccessful attempt to draw the UN intervention following the cease-fire which ended the Six Day War, the Egyptians launched a new round of artillery duels with Israeli forces. While Secretary Rogers pursued his peace plan, Pres. Gamal Abdel Nasser of Egypt, with the assistance of three brigades of Soviet troops, rapidly escalated the War of Attrition against Israeli forces at the Suez Canal in an attempt to inflict maximum casualties on Israeli forces.

== Aftermath: historical implications ==
In June 1970, Rogers initiated a ceasefire plan, sometimes called the Second Rogers Plan Egypt accepted the ceasefire plan. Israel eventually accepted it, which had resulted in the right-wing Gahal party leaving Golda Meir's government in August 1970. The acceptance had resulted in the August 7, 1970, "in place" cease-fire.

According to the cease-fire agreement, both sides were required not to change "the military status quo within zones extending 50 km to the east and west of the cease-fire line." Although forbidden in the ceasefire agreement, Egypt immediately moved anti-aircraft batteries into the zone. By October there were about 100 SAM sites in the zone, and Rogers made no diplomatic effort to secure their removal. He thus had little credibility in Israel, and the 1973 Yom Kippur War eventually occurred.

Israeli military assertiveness resulted in a political setback with the United States, but Nasser had gained a respite that enabled him to consolidate his missile defense systems that had grown out from the war. Nasser also used the negotiations as a way of opening the lines of communication with the United States to counter his growing reliance on the Soviet Union. The PLO was shocked and angered by the agreement, which led for Habash and Hawatmah attempts to overthrow King Hussein. The actions led to the Black September, a civil war that broke out in Jordan on September 16, 1970.

In June 1971, Rogers initiated a plan for an interim agreement across the Canal, which is sometimes called the "Third Rogers Plan."

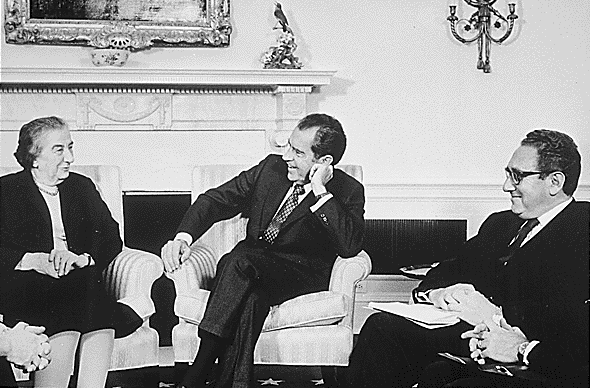
US President Richard Nixon and Israeli Prime Minister Golda Meir meeting on 1 March 1973 in the Oval Office. Nixon's National Security Advisor Henry Kissinger is to the right of Nixon.

No breakthrough occurred, even after Sadat, in a surprise move, suddenly expelled Soviet advisers from Egypt and again signaled to Washington his willingness to negotiate. However, on 28 February 1973, during a visit in Washington, D.C., Meir agreed with Henry Kissinger's peace proposal based on "security versus sovereignty:" Israel would accept Egyptian sovereignty over all Sinai, and Egypt would accept Israeli presence in some of Sinai strategic positions.

Sadat continued the trend by both standing by the Rogers Plan and kicking out the pro-Soviet group of Ali Sabry in April 1971. It is unlikely, however, that the United States viewed the relations the same way since the State Department's focus was competition with the Soviet Union, as opposed to regional conflicts. The resolution also exacerbated the divisions between Kissinger and Rogers, and the Middle Eastern countries saw that the goals of American foreign policy were different. Kissinger did not want to involve the Soviet Union or any Arab countries friendly to them; in hopes they would turn to the United States and reject the Soviet Union.

Israel used that in hopes of preventing all peace talks, which could have resulted in getting greater land capitulations from Arab countries due to Israel's military strength. Nasser forestalled any movement toward direct negotiations with Israel. In dozens of speeches and statements, Nasser posited the equation that any direct peace talks with Israel were tantamount to surrender.

In April 2025, a newly revealed audio recording from August 3, 1970, shed further light on Egypt's acceptance of the Rogers Plan. In a private conversation with Libyan leader Muammar Gaddafi, President Gamal Abdel Nasser expressed a pragmatic view of Egypt’s priorities, stating, "We have no interest in the Palestinian issue. We will only talk about Sinai. When [the Israelis] leave Sinai, there will be an agreement". In addition he said to Gaddafi: "You are welcome to mobilize the forces, go to Baghdad and try to fight against Israel. We will stay away from this operation, leave us alone - we will choose a non-violent and defeatist solution. I can live with that". Nasser also criticized other Arab leaders for engaging in "hollow slogans" about liberating Palestine and warned that such rhetoric could result in additional territorial losses, as had occurred after the 1948 Arab-Israeli War.
