= The Outsiders of Uskoken Castle =

1941 novel by Kurt Kläber

- Dust jacket for the 1967 edition
- Author: Kurt Kläber
- Original title: Rote Zora und ihre Bande
- Translator: Lynn Aubry
- Cover artist: Emanuel Schongut
- Publication date: 1941
- English publication date: 1967
- Pages: 353 pp
- OCLC: 1170405

The Outsiders of Uskoken Castle is a children's novel written by Kurt Kläber. The German original, Rote Zora und ihre Bande (Red Zora and her gang), was published under the pseudonym Kurt Held in 1941. The English version was translated from German by Lynn Aubry, illustrated by Emanuel Schongut and published in 1967 by Doubleday.

The story is about the adventures of Zora and a band of children who live in the ruins of an Uskok castle on the coast of Croatia. The children steal out of necessity, because they have no parents or other family to look after them. They are frequently involved in conflicts with the town's residents and reject the authority of adults, except for Gorian, an old fisherman who helps the children. When he needs help the children repay his kindness by coming to his rescue.

== Author ==
The German author lived in exile in Switzerland and wrote under a pseudonym to avoid political persecution.

== Background of the story ==
Kläber traveled to Yugoslavia in 1940, where he met Branko, Zora and her gang. The book is based on his experiences with these orphaned children in the Croatian city of Senj, where there is a castle called Nehaj Fortress.

In real life as in the story, the first child Kläber met in Senj was Branko, a boy who had recently been orphaned. Zora told Branko that the police were investigating him for stealing food. So Kläber was introduced to Zora. He wanted to take Branko and Zora back to Switzerland with him, but his refugee status made that impossible. Instead he wrote the children's story, intending to make it a political tool to draw attention to marginalized people in Europe. Zora became the central figure because Kläber was impressed with the way she organized the children into a gang and taught them solidarity. The boys accepted her as their leader.

== Title ==
The German title Rote Zora ... refers to Zora's red hair. The Uskoken in the English title refers to the Uskoks, a band of pirates from 16th century Senj.

== Plot summary ==
The book recounts the children's adventures as they live by the rules of their community and come into conflict with the city's residents. It begins by introducing some of the children. Branko's father is a traveling fiddler, so Branko used to live with his mother, who worked in a tobacco plant. But she has died, leaving Branko homeless. He finds a fish on the ground at the market, picks it up and is arrested for theft. Zora frees him through the window of the prison and takes him to the castle, which the gang has made their home. After passing a test of his courage, Branko is accepted into the gang of outlaws along with Nicola, Pavle and Duro.

The city residents persecute the children, who play pranks on them in retaliation. In one episode, the gang steals a chicken from the old fisherman Gorian, who is honest, poor and works hard. Branko and Zora feel sorry for him and try to repay him with chickens stolen from the wealthy Karaman. Gorian catches them and insists that they return the stolen chickens. The children promise to help Gorian by working for him when he is short-handed. They help him in his conflicts with a large fishery.

== Reception ==
The book was originally published by the Schweizer Sauerländer-Verlag in Aarau. As of 2007 it is still published in German by the Patmos Verlagsgruppe and is in its 36th printing. It has been translated into 18 languages, the latest being Croatian. The novel has been made into a film and a television series. The television series was aired on television in Croatia, but only late at night to prevent children from seeing it, the reason being that then the communist authorities did not want attention to be drawn to its marginalized people.

The book was adapted into a theater play by a Croatian actor/director Rene Medvešek, and it premiered in Trešnja theater in Zagreb in March 2017.

== See also ==
- Die Rote Zora, a German militant feminist group active in West Germany from 1974–1995, who took their name from the story because the band was founded and led by a girl.
