= Kurt Held =

German-Swiss writer and Communist

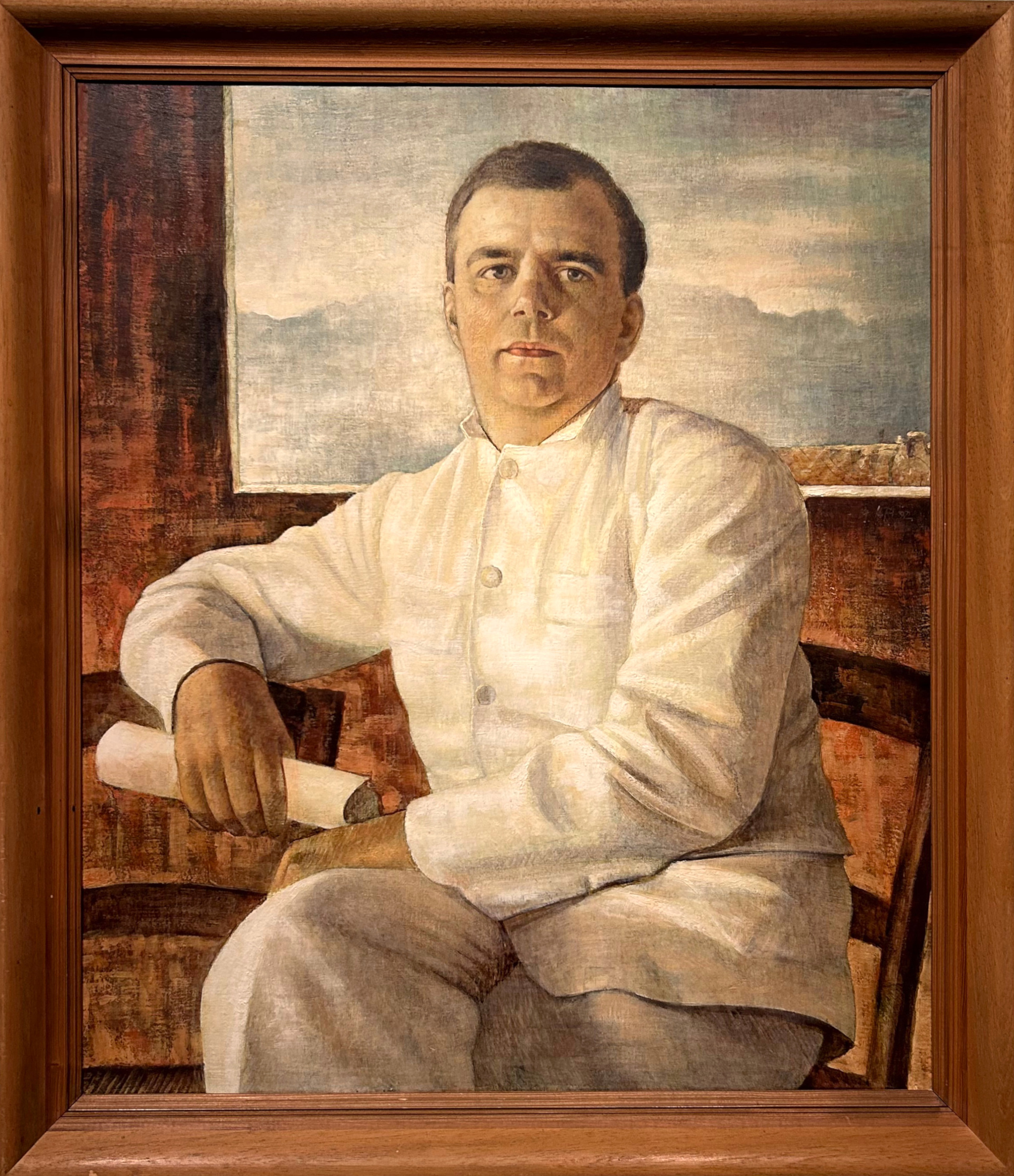
- Portrait by Maria Braun, c. 1930
- Born: Kurt Kläber; 4 November 1897; Jena, Germany
- Died: 9 December 1959 (aged 62); Sorengo, Switzerland
- Occupations: Author, writer
- Known for: The Outsiders of Oskoken Castle
- Spouse: Lisa Tetzner

Kurt Kläber (4 November 1897 – 9 December 1959), known under the pen name Kurt Held, was a German-Swiss communist activist and writer of proletarian and children's literature. He is best known for the 1941 novel The Outsiders of Uskoken Castle.

== Early life ==
Kläber was born in Jena on 4 November 1897, the son of Hermann Kläber, a construction foreman. He left school at the age of 14 and began apprenticed as a locksmith and later trained to be a mechanic at Zeiss. Kläber joined the Wandervogelbewegung and traveled through many countries of Europe.

Kläber's travels ended with the outbreak of World War I. He joined the German Army and fought in the war, during which he was wounded and contracted typhoid fever.

== Politics ==
Upon returning from the war, Kläber joined the Communist Party of Germany (KPD) and the Spartakusbund. He participated in armed uprisings in Halle, Hamburg and Berlin as well as in the strike against the Kapp-Putsch. Kläber earned his living as a traveling book salesmen for the Thüringen Ministry of Culture, specializing in political literature: social critical lyrics, as well as novels depicting the hardships of the working class. He published his first volume of workers poetry “Neue Saat” (new seed) in 1919. In 1923, Kläber traveled to the United States and spent a year touring, giving lectures and studying the situation of workers in the USA. Kläber's experiences in the USA became his first novel written in 1923, which wasn't published until 1927 “Passagiere der III. Klasse” (Third Class Passengers).

Back in Germany in 1924, Kläber married the writer and professional storyteller Lisa Tetzner. Together they traveled promoting communist literature. Kläber became famous as a working-class writer with the collection of socially critical stories Barrikaden an der Ruhr (Barricades on the Ruhr), published in 1925, which was targeted by censorship. In addition to writing, giving lectures and editing magazines and books Kläber also worked in mines near Köln, as well as other jobs to aid his understanding of the working class laborers. He joined the Bund proletarisch-revolutionäre Schriftsteller (the Association of Proletarian-Revolutionary Authors) and was one of the publishers of the journal regularly sent to their members, Linkskurve. Kläber gained a reputation as a leading authority on Communist literature.

As a known opponent of Nazism, Kläber was arrested the day after the Reichstag fire and incarcerated. He escaped to Carona in the canton of Ticino, Switzerland. In 1938, Kläber left the KPD in reaction to the increasingly Stalinist orientation of the party line.

== Career in Switzerland ==
With the encouragement of his wife, Lisa, Kläber devoted himself to writing. The conditions of his exile prohibited him from publishing under his own name, so he adopted the pseudonym Kurt Held. He saw children as the true victims of war, class struggle and injustice. His books portrayed children realistically and conveyed messages of morality. His greatest success "The Outsiders of Uskoken Castle" was soon followed by similar books about working class children: Der Trommler von Faido (The Drummer of Faido), Matthias und seine Freunde (Matthias and his Friends) and the four volume series Giuseppe und Maria.

Kläber became a naturalized Swiss citizen in 1948. He died on 9 December 1959 in Sorengo, Switzerland from the consequences of the typhoid fever he contracted in World War I.

== Books ==
- Neue Saat poetry Jena: Volksbuchhandlung, 1919
- Empörer! Empor! Stories, Sketches and Travel Reports. Berlin: Verlag Der Syndikalist, 1925
- Revolutionäre. Erzählungen aus den Kämpfen des Proletariats 1918–1925: Leipzig: Roter-Türmer-Verlag, 1925
- Barrikaden an der Ruhr novel 1925
- Passagiere der 3. Klasse novel Berlin: Internationaler Arbeiter-Verlag, 1927
- Die Toten von Pabjanice narrations Moskau: Verlagsgenossenschaft ausländ. Arbeiter in der UdSSR, 1936
- Die rote Zora und ihre Bande (The Outsiders of Oskoken Castle) Aarau: Sauerländer, 1941
- Der Trommler von Faido Historical tales of Levantina. 2 Bde. Aarau: Sauerländer, 1947 / 1949
- Matthias und seine Freunde Aarau. Sauerländer, 1950
- Spuk in Neuhausen Berlin: Weiss, 1951
- Alles für zwanzig Rappen The experiences of a small rebel Aarau: Sauerländer, 1951
- Giuseppe und Maria 4 volumes Aarau: Sauerländer, 1955–56 (A Journey to Naples, of smugglers, mercenaries and soldiers, the children's city, the process)
- Mein Bruder Georg Gütersloh: Rufer-Verlag, 1955

== Sources ==
https://web.archive.org/web/20191023105744/http://www.buchstart.ch/de/autoren/Held_Kurt/214.html https://web.archive.org/web/20110510020002/http://www.mdr.de/geschichte-mitteldeutschlands/reise/personen/132251.html
