= The Baader Meinhof Complex =

2008 German drama film

- Theatrical release poster
- Directed by: Uli Edel
- Written by: Bernd Eichinger; Uli Edel
- Based on: Der Baader Meinhof Komplex by Stefan Aust
- Produced by: Bernd Eichinger
- Starring: Martina Gedeck; Moritz Bleibtreu; Johanna Wokalek; Nadja Uhl; Jan Josef Liefers; Stipe Erceg; Niels Bruno Schmidt; Vinzenz Kiefer; Simon Licht; Alexandra Maria Lara; Hannah Herzsprung; Daniel Lommatzsch; Sebastian Blomberg; Heino Ferch; Bruno Ganz
- Cinematography: Rainer Klausmann
- Edited by: Alexander Berner
- Music by: Peter Hinderthür; Florian Tessloff
- Production company: Constantin Film Produktion
- Distributed by: Constantin Film Verleih (Germany); Metropolitan Filmexport (France); Bontonfilm (Czech Republic); Summit Entertainment (Overseas)
- Release dates: 25 September 2008 (Germany); 12 November 2008 (France); 3 April 2009 (Czech Republic)
- Running time: 149 minutes; 164 minutes (Extended cut)
- Countries: Germany; France; Czech Republic
- Language: German
- Budget: €13.5 million ($19.7 million)
- Box office: $16,498,827

The Baader Meinhof Complex (German: Der Baader Meinhof Komplex [deːɐ̯ ˈbaːdɐ ˈmaɪnhɔf kɔmˈplɛks]) is a 2008 German historical thriller film directed by Uli Edel. Written and produced by Bernd Eichinger, it stars Moritz Bleibtreu, Martina Gedeck and Johanna Wokalek. The film is based on the 1985 German best selling non-fiction book of the same name by Stefan Aust. It retells the story of the early years of the West German far-left terrorist organisation the Rote Armee Fraktion (Red Army Fraction, or Red Army Faction, a.k.a. RAF) from 1967 to 1977.

The film was nominated for Best Foreign Language Film at the 81st Academy Awards. It was also nominated for Best Foreign Language Film at the 66th Golden Globe Awards and for Best Film Not in the English Language at the 62nd British Academy Film Awards.

== Plot ==
In 1967, a visit by Shah Mohammad Reza Pahlavi of Iran to West Berlin leads to a clash between the West German student movement and German police. In the chaos, unarmed protestor Benno Ohnesorg is fatally shot by policeman Karl-Heinz Kurras, outraging the West German public, including left-wing journalist Ulrike Meinhof, who claims in a televised debate that West Germany is a fascist police state. Inspired by Meinhof's rhetoric, radical communists Gudrun Ensslin and Andreas Baader mastermind the Frankfurt department store firebombings of 1968. While covering their trial, Meinhof is moved by the radicals' commitment and befriends Ensslin during a prison interview before leaving her husband for radical-linked journalist Peter Homann. Left-wing activist Rudi Dutschke is injured in an assassination attempt by neo-nazi Josef Bachmann, further radicalizing the Left.

Ensslin and Baader are released pending an appeal and recruit youths, including Astrid Proll and Peter-Jürgen Boock, to their cause. After spending some time abroad, Baader, Ensslin and Proll move in with Meinhof, who begins advocating violent action but does not wish to leave her two children, Regine and Bettina Röhl. When Baader is arrested again, Meinhof arranges an "interview" off prison grounds, which Ensslin and the others use to break him out; though the plan called for Meinhof to appear innocent and stay behind, she flees with the radicals, incriminating herself. Meinhof sends Regine and Bettina to Sicily and the group receives guerilla training from Fatah in Jordan. Homann, overhearing the others asking Fatah to kill him and Meinhof planning to recruit her children as suicide bombers, leaves the group and arranges for his colleague Stefan Aust to return Meinhof's children to their father Klaus Rainer Röhl.

The radicals, now calling themselves the Red Army Faction (RAF), return to Germany and begin robbing banks. In response, German Federal Police chief Horst Herold orders all municipal police to be put under federal command for one day. During that day, RAF member Petra Schelm is pursued by police and killed in a shootout; viewing her death as murder rather than resisting arrest, Baader and Ensslin overrule Meinhof's objections and launch a deadly bombing campaign against police stations and United States military bases. However, under Herold's command, the police respond in force to the RAF's activities and many members, including Baader, Ensslin, Meinhof and Holger Meins, are arrested and imprisoned. They stage a hunger strike in separate prisons that results in Meins' death, while the authorities move Baader, Ensslin, Meinhof and Jan-Carl Raspe to Stammheim Prison, where they work on their defense for their trial and smuggle orders outside. In 1975, a group of younger RAF recruits acting on these orders seize the West German embassy in Stockholm, where they kill two hostages, Andreas von Mirbach and Heinz Hillegaart, and threaten to blow up the embassy if the prisoners are not released, but their bombs accidentally detonate, wounding everyone inside and killing RAF members Ulrich Wessel and Siegfried Hausner. The prisoners are appalled by the poor execution of their orders. Meinhof, suffering from depression and remorse over the deaths caused by the RAF's bombings, is subjected to sadistic emotional abuse by Baader and Ensslin, leading her to hang herself; the others falsely claim she was killed by the government.

Upon completing her sentence in 1977, Brigitte Mohnhaupt takes over command of the RAF and organizes the assassination of Attorney General Siegfried Buback as revenge for Meins and Meinhof's "murders". Mohnhaupt, Christian Klar and Susanne Albrecht also attempt to kidnap Dresdner Bank president Jürgen Ponto but they kill him when he fights back. Aware the imprisoned RAF members ordered both murders, the authorities place them in solitary confinement but Ensslin and Baader obtain radios to continue smuggling orders. Launching a new campaign of terror, Mohnhaupt abducts industrialist Hanns Martin Schleyer while the Popular Front for the Liberation of Palestine hijacks Lufthansa Flight 181, again with the goal of securing the prisoners' release but the West German government refuses to negotiate for Schleyer, while the PFLP hijackers are defeated by GSG 9. Baader and Ensslin tauntingly warn a negotiator and a prison chaplain respectively that the violence will continue; however, Ensslin also confides that she fears she will be killed soon.

The next morning, Baader and Raspe are found dead from gunshot wounds next to smuggled handguns, while Ensslin is found having been hung from her cell's barred window; Irmgard Möller is also found stabbed four times in the chest but she survives. The news devastates the RAF, who insist they were murdered but Mohnhaupt explains that they, like Meinhof, were "in control of the outcome until the very end". The RAF then murders Schleyer, signifying the continuation of RAF terrorism past the original members.

== Cast ==
- Martina Gedeck as Ulrike Meinhof
- Moritz Bleibtreu as Andreas Baader
- Johanna Wokalek as Gudrun Ensslin
- Nadja Uhl as Brigitte Mohnhaupt
- Stipe Erceg as Holger Meins
- Niels Bruno Schmidt as Jan Carl Raspe
- Vinzenz Kiefer as Peter-Jurgen Boock
- Simon Licht as Horst Mahler
- Alexandra Maria Lara as Petra Schelm
- Daniel Lommatzsch as Christian Klar
- Sebastian Blomberg as Rudi Dutschke
- Bruno Ganz as Horst Herold
- Heino Ferch as Herold's Assistant
- Jan Josef Liefers as Peter Homann
- Hannah Herzsprung as Susanne Albrecht
- Tom Schilling as Josef Bachmann
- Hans Werner Meyer as Klaus Rainer Röhl
- Katharina Wackernagel as Astrid Proll
- Anna Thalbach as Ingrid
- Volker Bruch as Stefan Aust
- Hubert Mulzer as Jürgen Ponto
- Alexander Held as Siegfried Buback
- Bernd Stegemann as Hanns Martin Schleyer
- Sandra Borgmann as Sieglinde Hofmann
- Christian Blümel as Siegfried Hausner
- Peter Schneider as Gerhard Müller
- Sunnyi Melles as Gerta Buddenberg
- Kirsten Block as Ignes Ponto
- Hans Peter Hallwachs as Günter von Drenkmann
- Holger Handtke as Policeman

== Production ==
The film began production in August 2007 with filming at several locations including Berlin, Munich, Stammheim Prison, Rome and Morocco. The film was subsidized by several film financing boards to the sum of EUR 6.5 million. The American trailer is narrated by actor Will Lyman, a voice commonly associated with serious documentary films.

== Distribution and reception ==
When the film opened in Germany last year, some younger viewers came out of theaters crestfallen that the Red Army Faction members, still mythologized, were such dead-enders. Some who were older complained that the film had made the gang look too attractive. But they were dead-enders, and they were attractive. A film about them, or any other popular terrorist movement, has to account for both facts if it seeks to explain not just their crimes but also their existence.

— Fred Kaplan, The New York Times.

The film premiered on 15 September 2008 in Munich and was commercially released in Germany on 25 September 2008. The film was chosen as Germany's official submission to the 81st Academy Awards for Best Foreign Language Film.

The Baader Meinhof Complex has an approval rating of 85% on review aggregator website Rotten Tomatoes, based on 98 reviews, and an average rating of 7.00/10. The website's critical consensus states, "Intricately researched and impressively authentic slice of modern German History, with a terrific cast, assured direction, and a cracking script". Metacritic assigned the film a weighted average score of 76 out of 100, based on 22 critics, indicating "generally favorable reviews".

The Hollywood Reporter gave the film a favorable review, praising the acting and storytelling, but also noting a lack of character development in certain parts. A mixed review with similar criticism was published in Variety. Fionnuala Halligan of Screen International praised the film's excellent production values as well as the efficient and crisp translation of a fascinating topic to film, but felt that the plot flatlines emotionally and does not hold much dramatic suspense for younger and non-European audiences unfamiliar with the film's historical events. Stanley Kauffmann of The New Republic wrote The Baader Meinhof Complex was "a dynamic and fascinating account of the German terrorists of the 1970s".

Christopher Hitchens lavishly praised The Baader Meinhof Complex in a review for Vanity Fair. He singled out what he considered "the filmmakers' decision to strike against Hollywood's usual practice of glamorizing Marxist insurgents" by making an explicit connection between revolutionary and criminal violence. By slowly erasing the difference between the two, Hitchens wrote, the film exposed the "uneasy relationship between sexuality and cruelty, and between casual or cynical attitudes to both", as well as the RAF's tendency to offer unquestioning support to the most extreme factions of the Marxist and Islamist underground. Relating his own memories of West Germany during the era, Hitchens further described Far Left terrorism by adherents of the counterculture of the 1960s as representing, "a form of psychosis" that swept through the former Axis powers of Germany, Japan, and Italy a generation after the end of the Second World War. Comparing the RAF to the Japanese Red Army and the Italian Red Brigades, Hitchens wrote, "The propaganda of the terrorists showed an almost neurotic need to 'resist authority' in a way that their parents' generation had so terribly failed to do." In conclusion, Hitchens praised the film's depiction of an escalating cycle of violence and paranoia in "which mania feeds upon itself and becomes hysterical". Film and Red Army Faction scholar Christina Gerhardt wrote a more critical review for Film Quarterly. Arguing that its nonstop action failed to engage the historical and political events depicted, she wrote "During its 150 minutes, the film achieves action-film momentum—bombs exploding, bullets spraying, and glass shattering—and this inevitably comes at the expense of historical excavation."

French movie director Olivier Assayas, who subsequently made Carlos, a miniseries about left-wing terrorist Carlos the Jackal in 2010, wrote that the film addresses a very painful subject for modern Germany and called it, "some kind of revolution". He admitted, however, that his own perspective was limited: "I'm not German and I'm not an expert, but I never really bought the collective suicide theory. For me it's absolutely impossible to believe. So I don't think The Baader Meinhof Complex fully addresses the issue. The supposed suicides in Stammheim prison are for me the elephant in the living room of German politics dealing with that subject. You have to take a position on the subject and face it. The Baader Meinhof Complex doesn't exactly face it."

The Filmbewertungsstelle Wiesbaden, Germany's national agency which evaluates movies on their artistic, documentary and historical significance, gave the movie the rating "especially valuable". In their explanatory statement the committee says: "the film tries to do justice to the terrorists as well as to the representatives of the German state by describing both sides with an equally objective distance." The committee summarized the film as: "German history as a big movie production: impressive, authentic, political, tantalizing."

=== Reception from the families of those killed by the RAF ===
Aust's film has been criticized in Germany and Israel for making terrorist thuggery too glamorous. But in order to capture Baader-Meinhof accurately, the film needs to convey its appeal at the time. From mental patients to left-wing ideologues, from rebellious teens to sexually frustrated professionals, the gang's members captivated many Germans with derring-do and self-conscious theatricality.

— Fred Seigel
City Journal, 18 September 2009

Prior to seeing the film, Michael Buback, the son of West German Attorney General Siegfried Buback, expressed doubts that the film would seriously attempt to present the historical truth. He later amended this statement after seeing the film, but expressed regret that The Baader Meinhof Complex concentrates almost exclusively on members of the RAF, which carried the danger that viewers would identify too strongly with the protagonists.

As a protest against the "distorted" and "almost completely false" portrayal of the RAF's assassination of banker Jürgen Ponto, Ignes Ponto, his widow and witness, returned her Federal Cross of Merit. She further accused the German government, which co-produced the film through various film financing funds, as jointly responsible for the "public humiliations" suffered by the Ponto family. Ponto's daughter Corinna, also made a statement calling the film's violation of her family's privacy "wrong" and "particularly perfidious".

Jörg Schleyer, the son of murdered Confederation of German Employers' Associations President Hanns Martin Schleyer, praised the film. In an interview with Der Spiegel, Schleyer expressed a belief that The Baader Meinhof Complex accurately portrays the RAF for the first time in a German film as "a ruthless and merciless gang of murderers". Commenting on the film's graphic violence, he said, "Only a movie like this can show young people how brutal and bloodthirsty the RAF's actions were at that time."

== Extended version ==
The German TV channel ARD aired the film split in two parts with new footage added to each part. This extended version was later released in Germany on DVD as well. The first part adds ten minutes and 41 seconds of new footage, the second part 3 minutes and 41 seconds.
