= Sieglinde Hofmann =

German militant (born 1945)

- Born: 14 March 1945 (age 80); Bad Königshofen, Bavaria, Germany
- Organization(s): Socialist Patients' Collective, Red Army Faction

Sieglinde Hofmann (born 14 March 1945) was a German militant and member of both the Socialist Patients' Collective and the Red Army Faction.

== Biography ==
As a child Hofmann attended a Catholic girls' school and went on to train to become a nurse and then a social worker. She was believed to have joined the Red Army Faction (as part of their second generation) in 1976 after having first joined the SPK and was suspected of involvement in the killing of banker Jürgen Ponto. It is now known that it was actually the terrorists Susanne Albrecht, Brigitte Mohnhaupt and Christian Klar who took part in the Ponto assassination.

Hofmann was among the group of terrorists who took part in the kidnapping of Hanns-Martin Schleyer. She walked along the road that Schleyer's convoy was passing pushing a pram laden with guns. She pushed the pram out into the middle of the street to stop the convoy from driving past, and as the cars slowed to a stop, she, along with a group of RAF terrorists, ambushed the cars, murdering Schleyer's driver, his bodyguard and two police officers.

Hofmann, along with Brigitte Mohnhaupt, Peter-Jürgen Boock and Rolf Wagner was arrested on 11 May 1978 in Yugoslavia, but they were all freed and flown to an undisclosed country of their choice. Some, including Hofmann, immediately went back underground. Two years later, however, on 5 May 1980, Hofmann was rearrested in Paris (alongside Ingrid Barabass), following a raid on a RAF safehouse.

== Imprisonment ==
Although initially only charged with involvement in the murder of Ponto and condemned to serve fifteen years in prison, Hofmann was taken back into custody three days before the end of her sentence in August 1995 to be tried for other offences. The second trial was only possible after a judicial clarification in France.

On 26 September of the same year, Hofmann, then 50 years old, was found guilty of involvement in five cases of murder, and three cases of attempted murder by the Higher Regional Court in Stuttgart, and was sentenced to life imprisonment. Her crimes included her offences against Ponto, and other crimes such as a failed bomb attack on NATO Commander Alexander Meigs Haig, Jr. and the murder/kidnapping of the President of the German Employer's Association, Hanns Martin Schleyer. She was, however, released from prison on 5 May 1999.

== See also ==
- Members of the RAF
- The Baader-Meinhof Gang
