= Hajo Wandschneider =

German defense lawyer

Hajo Wandschneider (December 21, 1925 in Hamburg – March 25, 2017 in Hamburg) was a German defense lawyer.

== Biography ==
Wandschneider was the son of the defense attorney Erich Wandschneider. He defended inter alia Conrad Ahlers in the Spiegel affair and the RAF (Red Army Faction) terrorist, Susanne Albrecht. He also defended the choirmaster and composer Erich Bender and the orthopedist Rupprecht Bernbeck in court.

== Career ==
Wandschneider was a member of the German section of Amnesty International and a founding member of the Hamburg section.
