= Boock (surname) =

Boock is a surname. Notable people with the surname include:

- Paula Boock (born 1964), New Zealand writer and editor
- Peter-Jürgen Boock (born 1951), German member of the Red Army Faction
- Stephen Boock (born 1951), New Zealand cricketer

== See also ==
- Brock (surname)
