= 18. Oktober 1977 =

Series of paintings by Gerhard Richter

18. Oktober 1977 is the title of a series of paintings by Gerhard Richter. It is based on photographs that document the deaths of three leading activists of the Baader-Meinhof Group in the Stammheim Prison after the release of the hostages in the hijacking by four members of the Popular Front for the Liberation of Palestine of Lufthansa Flight 181. The series shows events from a period of several years, from the capture of the terrorists to their burial. A youth portrait of Ulrike Meinhof occupies a special position.

== Description ==
The series consists of 15 paintings in dull grey tones executed in oil paint after police and press photos, their contours blurred. The terrorism of the Red Army Faction (RAF), which kept the Federal Republic of Germany in suspense for ten years, is for Richter a metaphor for any ideology based on inhumanity. In an interview the artist clarifies his motives and responds to the question of whether the RAF is a victim of its own ideology: Certainly. But not victim of a certain left- or right-wing ideology, but of ideological behaviour in general. It has more to do with the eternal human dilemma: revolutionize and fail. The series originated between March and November 1988, ten years after the events. From hundreds of photos, Richter selected twelve motifs that he used to create 18 paintings, of which he later rejected three.

Ulrike Meinhof, Andreas Baader, Gudrun Ensslin and Holger Meins are depicted in the paintings, but the characters are neither easily identifiable by their facial features nor by the titles of the paintings. The titles and the images are kept impersonal. The level of blur of the images differs; Only Meinhof and Ensslin are recognizable because they are less blurred, the others can only be identified after comparison with the source photos.

Tote (English: Dead) is the title of three paintings (62 × 67 cm, 62 × 62 cm, 35 × 40 cm, Catalogue Raisonné: 667/1-3), that show a side view of the head and shoulders of Ulrike Meinhof lying on her back after her suicide on May 9, 1976. The images become progressively more blurry as their size decreases, and the clipping varies.

The painting Erhängte (English: Hanged) (200 × 140 cm, Catalogue Raisonné: 668) reveals the shadowy figure of Gudrun Ensslin, who hanged herself on 18 October 1977 from the bars of her cell in Stammheim. There was a second version that Richter did not include in the cycle and painted over (Decke, Catalogue Raisonné: 680/3).

In the paintings Erschossener 1 and Erschossener 2 (English: Man Shot Down 1 and Man Shot Down 2) (both 100 × 140 cm, Catalogue Raisonné: 669 / 1–2) the body of Andreas Baader can be seen lying on the cell floor. Both pictures were made after a police photo published in the Stern magazine in 1980, the second picture being more blurred.

Zelle (English: Cell) (200 × 140 cm, Catalogue Raisonné: 670) Shows Baader's cell after the discovery of the suicides. Like the others, this picture refers to a police photo. It was published in Stern in 1980. The right side of the picture is dominated by a book case, with notable blurring in the vertical direction.

The paintings Gegenüberstellung 1-3 (English: Confrontation 1-3) (112 x 120 cm. Catalogue Raisonné: 671/1-3) were based on press photos made after the arrest of Gudrun Ensslin in the summer of 1972. Richter heavily cropped the image to the upper body of the prisoners, the situation can only be conjectured from the shadow cast on the wall.

The least amount of blurring is evident in Jugendbildnis (English: Youth portrait) (67 × 62 cm, Catalogue Raisonné: 672–1), that represents a 22 year old Ulrike Meinhof. The original photograph is from October 10, 1966.

No other image shows its subject in such clarity. [...] Presentient, but unencumbered in its youthfulness is the gaze of the young Ulrike Meinhof who looks into the viewer's space from the black of the background. Temporarily ahead of the other motifs, the look signals dreamy confidence. Like in no other picture, the figure prevails against the texture of blurring and signals a remainder of immediacy; a directness that negates the entire series in its thematization of mediated communicability.

— Martin Henatsch, Gerhard Richter. 18. Oktober 1977. Das verwischte Bild der Geschichte. S. 74.

Relatively clear is also Plattenspieler (English: Record Player) (62 × 83 cm, Catalogue Raisonné: 672–2). It takes a special role in the cycle. With tone arm resting beside the record, it seems to fix a moment of silence, but in fact the record player was the "catalyst for the tragic outcome of history"; Baader's pistol was hidden inside it, and to the left of the machine are the cables that served Ensslin as a deadly sling.

Beerdigung (English: Funeral) (200 × 320 cm, Werkverzeichnis: 673) is the largest image in the series. It shows the burial of Andreas Baader, Gudrun Ensslin und Jan-Carl Raspe at the Dornhaldenfriedhof in Stuttgart on October 27, 1977. Their three coffins are clearly visible in the centre of the painting, surrounded by an anonymous crowd of mourners.

Festnahme 1 and Festnahme 2 (English: Arrest 1 and Arrest 2 ) (both 92 × 126 cm, Catalogue Raisonné: 674/1-2) are based on police photographs that were taken during the arrest of Holger Meins, Andreas Baader und Jan-Carl Raspe on June 1, 1972, in Frankfurt am Main and that were published on June 8, 1972, in the magazine Stern. A garage yard is recognizable, with several cars, including an armoured police car. Of the arrested terrorists, only Holger Meins is visible in the second image.

== Exhibitions ==
The series was first exhibited in Museum Haus Esters in Krefeld in 1989. In the same year, exhibitions at Portikus in Frankfurt am Main, the Institute of Contemporary Arts, London and Museum Boymans van Beuningen in Rotterdam followed. In 1990 the paintings were exhibited in the Saint Louis Art Museum, the Grey Art Gallery in New York, the Musée des beaux-arts de Montréal and the Lannan Foundation in Los Angeles. The series was on display at the Museum für Moderne Kunst in Frankfurt am Main, as a long-term loan from the artist until it was sold to the Museum of Modern Art in New York in 1995. In 2004 it was part of the exhibition Das MoMA in Berlin in the Neue Nationalgalerie in Berlin. From February 5, 2011, to May 15, 2011, the Bucerius Kunst Forum in Hamburg showed the work as part of the exhibition Gerhard Richter. Bilder einer Epoche. From May 18, 2014, to September 7, 2014, the work was at the Fondation Beyeler in Riehen (Basel).

== Bibliography ==
- Museum für Moderne Kunst und Portikus, Frankfurt am Main (Hrsg.): Presseberichte zu Gerhard Richter „18. Oktober 1977“. Verlag der Buchhandlung Walther König, Köln 1989, ISBN 3-88375-123-5.
- Museum Haus Esters, Krefeld und Portikus, Frankfurt am Main (Hrsg.): Gerhard Richter 18. Oktober 1977. 2. Auflage. Verlag der Buchhandlung Walther König, Köln 1991, ISBN 3-88375-105-7.
- Hubertus Butin: Zu Richters Oktober-Bildern. Museum für Moderne Kunst, Frankfurt am Main. König, Köln 1991, ISBN 3-88375-141-3.
- Kai-Uwe Hemken: Gerhard Richter. 18. Oktober 1977. Insel, Frankfurt am Main 1998.
- Martin Henatsch: Gerhard Richter. 18. Oktober 1977. Das verwischte Bild der Geschichte. Fischer, Frankfurt am Main 1998, ISBN 3-596-13626-1.
- Robert Storr: Gerhard Richter October 18, 1977. Hatje Cantz, 2000, ISBN 3-7757-0976-2.
- Ortrud Westheider: Eine Idee, die bis zum Tod geht. Der Zyklus 18. Oktober 1977. In: Gerhard Richter. Bilder einer Epoche. Ausstellungskatalog, Hrsg. Uwe M. Schneede. Hirmer, München 2011, S. 154–193.
