= Vinzenz Kiefer =

German actor (born 1979)

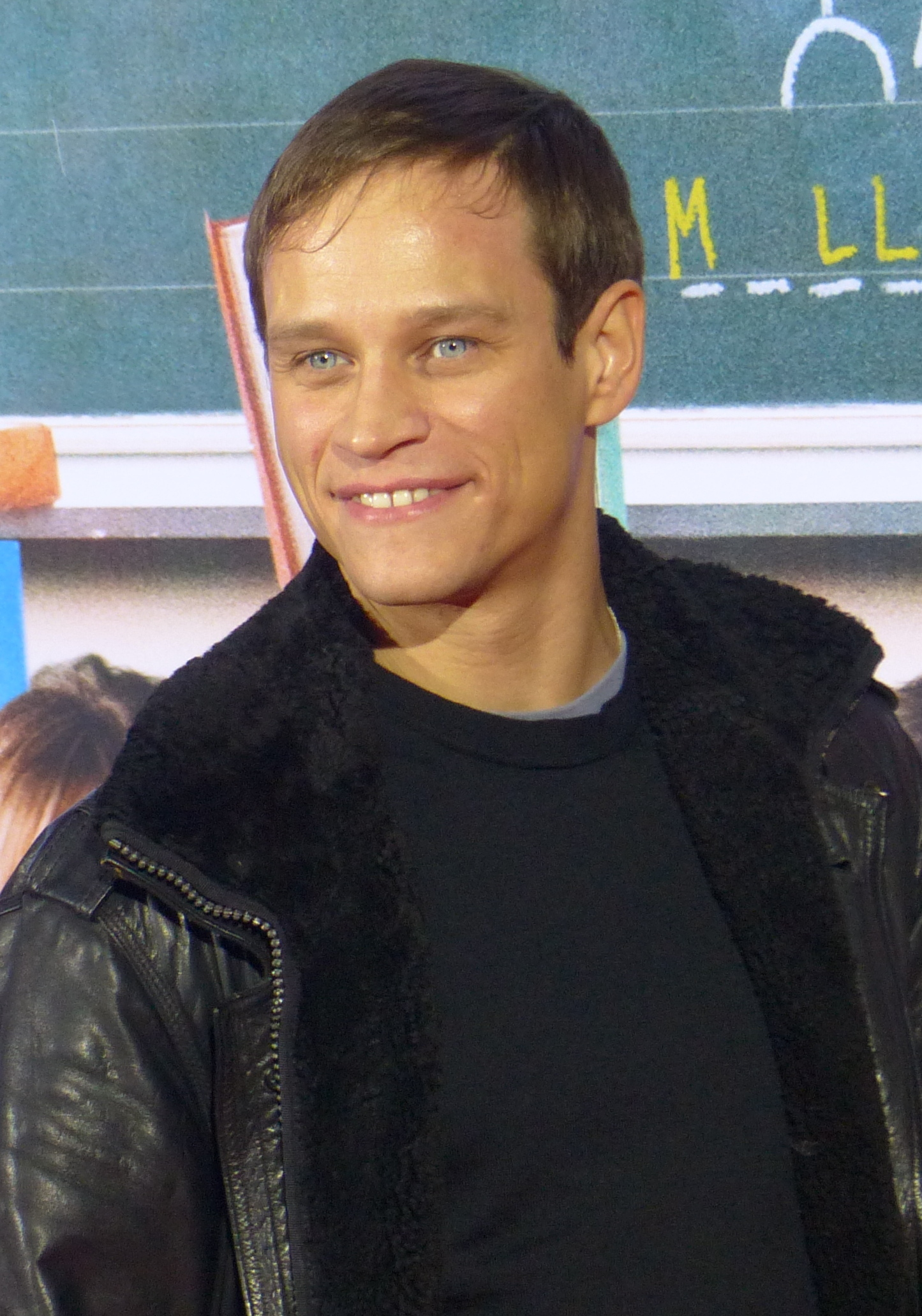
- Kiefer in 2015
- Born: 29 January 1979 (age 47); Weilburg, West Germany
- Occupation: Actor
- Spouse: Masha Tokareva

Vinzenz Georg Kiefer (born 29 January 1979) is a German actor. He is known for playing the role of police detective Alexander Brandt in the crime series Alarm für Cobra 11, Christian Dassault in Jason Bourne, as well as playing Peter-Jürgen Boock in The Baader-Meinhof Complex.

== Early life and education ==
Kiefer's father is a former Catholic priest and his mother a gospel singer. His sister, Dorkas Kiefer, is also an actress. He grew up in Braunfels and attended high school in Weilburg an der Lahn.

== Career ==
Kiefer began his television career in 1997 without formal acting training in the RTL series " Unter uns". Later, he took acting lessons from Manfred Schwabe, Ursula Michaelis, Christoph Hilger, Frank Müller-Sendino, Michael Margotta, and Björn Johnson. In 2002, he completed a workshop at the Lee Strasberg Institute in New York.

For his roles in the films Im Namen des Herrn and Tatort: Im Visier, Kiefer received the Günter Strack Television Award for Best Newcomer in 2004. He became known to a wider German film and television audience in 2008 through leading roles in the television two-parter Der Seewolf and Uli Edel's Der Baader Meinhof Komplex. In Doris Dörrie's 2012 film Glück, he played a leading role alongside Alba Rohrwacher. In the summer of 2013, Kiefer appeared on stage at the Nibelungen Festival in Worms in a new production of Hebbel's Nibelungen – born to die, playing the lead role of Siegfried, directed by Dieter Wedel.

From 2014 to 2015, Kiefer starred in the RTL action series Alarm für Cobra 11 as Detective Alex Brandt, replacing his predecessor Tom Beck (in his role as chief commissioner Ben Jäger). He was also cast that same year as Christian Dassault in Jason Bourne, and would later play German tank commander Klaus Jäger in the 2019 Russian WW2 film, T-34.

== Personal life ==
Kiefer lives in Berlin-Charlottenburg. Since September 2016 he has been married to actress Masha Tokareva.
