= Red Army Faction =

West German far-left militant organisation (1970–1998)

- Rote Armee Fraktion
- Later design of the RAF's insignia showing a red star and a Heckler & Koch MP5 submachine gun
- Founders: Andreas Baader; Ulrike Meinhof; Gudrun Ensslin; Horst Mahler
- Dates active: 14 May 1970 – 20 April 1998 (27 years, 341 days)
- Active regions: West Germany (until 1990); Germany (from 1990); France; Netherlands; Sweden
- Ideology: Communism; Marxism–Leninism; Maoism; Revolutionary socialism; Anti-fascism; Anti-imperialism
- Political position: Far-left

The Red Army Faction (German: Rote Armee Fraktion, pronounced [ˌʁoːtə ʔaʁˈmeː fʁakˌtsi̯oːn]; RAF [ˌɛʁʔaːˈʔɛf]), (Note: See the section "Name") also known as the Baader–Meinhof Group or Baader–Meinhof Gang (German: Baader-Meinhof-Gruppe / Baader-Meinhof-Bande [ˈbaːdɐ ˈmaɪnhɔf ˈɡʁʊpə]), was a West German far-left militant group founded in 1970, active until 1998, and formally designated a terrorist organisation by the West German government. (Note: "18 August 1976: West Germany enacted § 129a of the Criminal Code, which created the offence of "forming, joining, or supporting a terrorist organisation." This law became a central basis for prosecuting RAF members; for example, Christine Dümlein, who joined the RAF in 1980, was convicted solely of "membership in a terrorist organisation."(Smith & Moncourt 2009, pp. 566, 601); "Dümlein Christine, ... Joined the RAF in 1980, ... the only crime she was guilty of was membership in a terrorist organization"(Smith & Moncourt 2009, p. 566)) The RAF described itself as a communist and anti-imperialist urban guerrilla group. It was engaged in armed resistance against what it considered a fascist state. Members of the RAF generally used the Marxist–Leninist term "faction" when they wrote in English. Early leadership included Andreas Baader, Ulrike Meinhof, Gudrun Ensslin, and Horst Mahler.

The RAF engaged in a series of bombings, assassinations, kidnappings, bank robberies, and shootouts with police over the course of three decades, which was known as the RAF terrorism. Its activities peaked in late 1977, which led to a national crisis that became known as the "German Autumn". The RAF has been held responsible for 34 deaths, including industrialist and former SS officer Hanns Martin Schleyer, Dresdner Bank head Jürgen Ponto, federal prosecutor Siegfried Buback, police officers, American servicemen stationed in Germany, as well as many cases of collateral damage, such as chauffeurs and bodyguards, with many others injured throughout its almost thirty years of activity; 26 RAF members or supporters were killed. Although better-known, the RAF conducted fewer attacks than the Revolutionary Cells, which is held responsible for 296 bomb attacks, arson and other attacks between 1973 and 1995. The group was motivated by leftist political concerns and the perceived failure of their parents' generation to confront Germany's Nazi past, and in later years some ex-members received support from Stasi and other Eastern Bloc security services.

Sometimes, the group is talked about in terms of generations:

- the "first generation", which consisted of Baader, Ensslin, Meinhof and others;
- the "second generation", after the majority of the first generation was arrested in 1972.
- the "third generation", which existed in the 1980s and 1990s up to 1998, after the first generation died in Stammheim maximum security prison in 1977

RAF armed campaign
- Part of the Cold War
Date	14 May 1970 – 20 April 1998 (27 years, 341 days)
Location	West Germany, other countries
Result	German government victory RAF disbanded

Belligerents
Germany; Netherlands; United States; Israel	Red Army Faction; Revolutionary Cells; PFLP-GC

Commanders and leaders
Helmut Schmidt; Willy Brandt; Hans-Dietrich Genscher; Werner Maihofer; Horst Herold; H.-J. Wischnewski; Ulrich Wegener	Andreas Baader (executed); Gudrun Ensslin (executed); Ulrike Meinhof (executed); Wadie Haddad

Casualties and losses
34 dead Min. 200 injured	20 dead Min. 1 injured

On 20 April 1998, an eight-page typewritten letter in German was faxed to the Reuters news agency, signed "RAF" with the submachine-gun red star, declaring that the group had dissolved. In 1999, after a robbery in Duisburg, evidence pointing to Ernst-Volker Staub and Daniela Klette was found, causing an official investigation into a re-founding.

== Name ==
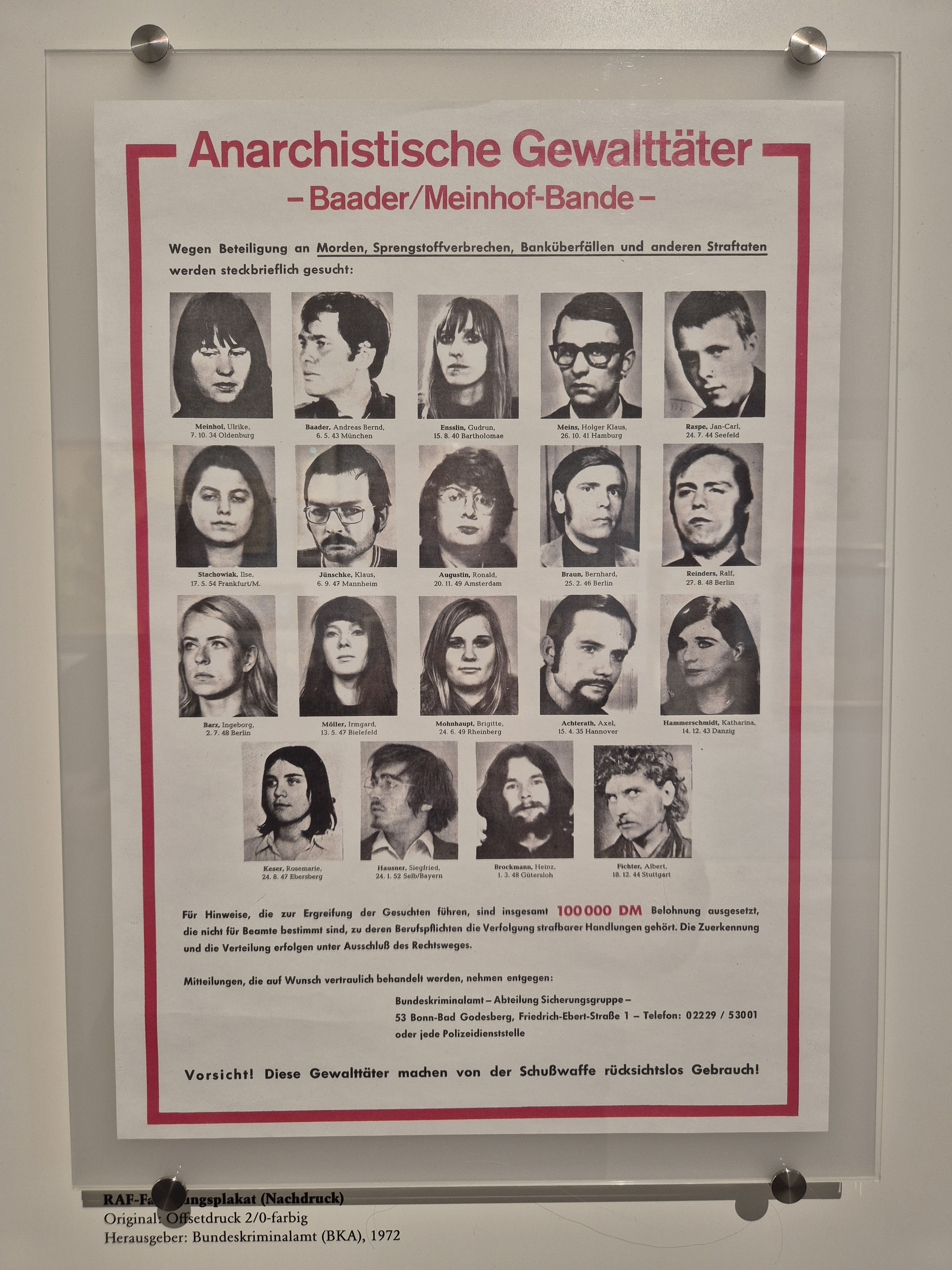
Red Army Faction public poster, 1972, issued by the Federal Criminal Office, on display at the Deutsches Museum, Munich

The usual translation into English is the "Red Army Faction"; however, the founders wanted it to reflect not a splinter group but rather an embryonic militant unit that was embedded, in or part of, a wider communist workers' movement, (Note: In Leninist terminology a "fraction" is a subset of a larger communist movement. For example, the 12 July 1921 "Theses on the Structure of Communist Parties, submitted to the Third Congress of the Comintern" states that "to carry out daily party work every member should as a rule belong to a small working group, a committee, a commission, a fraction, or a cell." Cited in Louis Proyect, "The Comintern and the German Communist Party;" or the description of the "Bolshevik-Leninist Fraction" in the article Communist League (UK, 1932).) i.e., a fraction of a whole.

The group always called itself the Rote Armee Fraktion, never the Baader–Meinhof Group or Baader–Meinhof Gang. The name refers to all incarnations of the organization: the "first generation" RAF, which consisted of Baader, Ensslin, Meinhof, and others; the "second generation" RAF; and the "third generation" RAF, which existed in the 1980s and 90s. The terms "Baader–Meinhof Gang" and "Baader–Meinhof Group" were first used by the media and the government. The group never used these names to refer to itself, because it viewed itself as a co-founded group consisting of numerous members and not a group with two figureheads.

== Background ==
"The Red Army Faction's Urban Guerrilla Concept is not based on an optimistic view of the prevailing circumstances in the Federal Republic and West Berlin."

— The Urban Guerrilla Concept written by RAF co-founder Ulrike Meinhof (April 1971)

The origins of the group can be traced back to the 1968 student protest movement in West Germany. Industrialised nations in the late 1960s experienced social upheavals related to the maturing of the "baby boomers", the Cold War, and the end of colonialism. Newly-found youth identity and issues such as racism, women's liberation, and anti-imperialism were at the forefront of left-wing politics. Many young people were alienated from their parents and the institutions of the state. The historical legacy of Nazism drove a wedge between the generations and increased suspicion of authoritarian structures in society (some analysts saw the same occurring in post-fascism Italy, giving rise to Brigatte Rosse).

In West Germany there was anger among leftist youth at the post-war denazification in West Germany and East Germany, a process which these leftists perceived as a failure or as ineffective, as former (actual and supposed) Nazis held positions in government and the economy. The Communist Party of Germany had been outlawed since 1956. Elected and appointed government positions down to the local level were often occupied by ex-Nazis. Konrad Adenauer, the first Federal Republic chancellor (in office 1949–1963), had even appointed former Nazi jurist Hans Globke as Director of the Federal Chancellery of West Germany (in office 1953–1963).

The radicals regarded the conservative media as biased – at the time conservatives such as Axel Springer, who was implacably opposed to student radicalism, owned and controlled the conservative media including all of the most influential mass-circulation tabloid newspapers. The emergence of the Grand Coalition between the two main parties, the SPD and CDU, with former Nazi Party member Kurt Georg Kiesinger as chancellor, occurred in 1966. This horrified many on the left and was viewed as a monolithic, political marriage of convenience with pro-NATO, pro-capitalist collusion on the part of the social democratic SPD. With about 90% of the Bundestag controlled by the coalition, an Extra-Parliamentary Opposition (APO) was formed with the intent of generating protest and political activity outside of government. In 1972 a law was passed – the Radikalenerlass – that banned radicals or those with a "questionable" political persuasion from public sector jobs.

Student activists, who associated older generations of Germans with Nazism, argued against peaceful reconciliation:

They'll kill us all. You know what kind of pigs we're up against. This is the Auschwitz generation. You can't argue with people who made Auschwitz. They have weapons and we haven't. We must arm ourselves!

— Gudrun Ensslin speaking after the death of Benno Ohnesorg.

The radicalized were, like many in the New Left, influenced by:

- Sociological developments, together with the background of counter-cultural movements.
- Post-war writings on class society and empire as well as contemporary Marxist critiques from many revolutionaries such as Frantz Fanon, Ho Chi Minh, and Che Guevara, as well as early Autonomism.
- Philosophers associated with the Frankfurt school (Jürgen Habermas, Herbert Marcuse, and Oskar Negt in particular) and associated Marxist philosophers.

RAF founder Ulrike Meinhof had a long history in the Communist Party. Holger Meins had studied film and was a veteran of the Berlin revolt; his short feature How To Produce A Molotov Cocktail was seen by huge audiences. Jan Carl Raspe lived at the Kommune 2; Horst Mahler was an established lawyer but also at the center of the anti-Springer revolt from the beginning. From their personal experiences and assessments of the socio-economic situation, they soon became more specifically influenced by Leninism and Maoism, calling themselves "Marxist–Leninist" though they effectively added to or updated this ideological tradition. RAF frequently cited Mao Zedong in its public statements, especially in its early years. One of the Maoist doctrines emphasized by the group was the importance of organizing political resistance to bourgeois society, and that armed struggle from the fringes of society will bring the revolution into mainstream society as well, with the bourgeois state revealing its oppressive apparatus by overreacting to fringe groups and their activities. A contemporaneous critique of the Red Army Faction's view of the state, published in a pirate edition of Le Monde Diplomatique, ascribed to it "state-fetishism" – an ideologically obsessive misreading of bourgeois dynamics and the nature and role of the state in post-WWII societies, including West Germany.

It is claimed that property destruction during the Watts riots in the United States in 1965 influenced the practical and ideological approach of the RAF founders, as well as some of those in Situationist circles. According to one former RAF member, in meetings with KGB in Dresden the group was also met by Vladimir Putin, then KGB resident in East Germany. In these meetings RAF members would discuss weapons that were needed for their activities, and pass a "shopping list" to the KGB.

The writings of Antonio Gramsci and Herbert Marcuse were drawn upon. Gramsci wrote on power, cultural, and ideological conflicts in society and institutions – real-time class struggles playing out in rapidly developing industrial nation states through interlinked areas of political behavior. Marcuse wrote on coercion and hegemony in that cultural indoctrination and ideological manipulation through the means of communication ("repressive tolerance") dispensed with the need for complete brute force in modern 'liberal democracies'. His One-Dimensional Man was addressed to the restive students of the sixties. Marcuse argued that only marginal groups of students and poor alienated workers could effectively resist the system. Both Gramsci and Marcuse came to the conclusion that analyzing the ideological underpinnings and the 'superstructure' of society was vitally important to understanding class control (and acquiescence). This Gramscian and Marcusian contribution could perhaps be seen as an extension of Marx's work, as he did not cover this area in detail. Das Kapital, his mainly economic work, was meant to be one of a series of books which would have included one on society and one on the state, but his death prevented fulfillment of this.

Many of the radicals felt that Germany's lawmakers were continuing authoritarian policies from the country's past and that the public's apparent acquiescence to these policies was a consequence of the indoctrination that the Nazis had pioneered and implemented in German society (Volksgemeinschaft). The Federal Republic was exporting arms to African dictatorships, which the radicals viewed as supporting the war in Southeast Asia and engineering the remilitarization of Germany with the U.S.-led entrenchment against the Warsaw Pact nations.

The ongoing events further catalyzed the situation. Protests turned into riots on 2 June 1967, when Mohammad Reza Pahlavi, the Shah of Iran, visited West Berlin. There were protesters but also hundreds of supporters of the Shah, as well as a group of fake supporters armed with wooden staves, there to disturb the normal course of the visit. These extremists beat the protesters. After a day of angry protests by exiled Iranian radical Marxists, a group widely supported by German students, the Shah visited the Berlin Opera, where a crowd of German student protesters gathered. During the opera house demonstrations, German student Benno Ohnesorg was shot in the head by a police officer while attending his first protest rally. The officer, Karl-Heinz Kurras, was acquitted in a subsequent trial. It was later discovered that Kurras had been a member of the West Berlin communist party SEW and had also worked for the Stasi, though there is no indication that Kurras' killing of Ohnesorg was under anyone's, including the Stasi's, orders.

Along with perceptions of state and police brutality, and widespread opposition to the Vietnam War, Ohnesorg's death galvanized many young Germans and became a rallying point for the West German New Left. The Berlin 2 June Movement, a militant-Anarchist group, later took its name to honor the date of Ohnesorg's death.

On 2 April 1968, Gudrun Ensslin and Andreas Baader, joined by Thorwald Proll and Horst Söhnlein, set fire to two department stores in Frankfurt as a protest against the Vietnam war. They were arrested two days later.

On 11 April 1968, Rudi Dutschke, a leading spokesman for protesting students, was shot in the head in an assassination attempt by the right-wing sympathizer Josef Bachmann. Although badly injured, Dutschke returned to political activism with the German Green Party before his death in a bathtub in 1979, as a consequence of his injuries.

Axel Springer's populist newspaper Bild-Zeitung, which had run headlines such as "Stop Dutschke now!", was accused of being the chief culprit in inciting the shooting. Meinhof commented, "If one sets a car on fire, that is a criminal offence. If one sets hundreds of cars on fire, that is political action."

== Formation ==
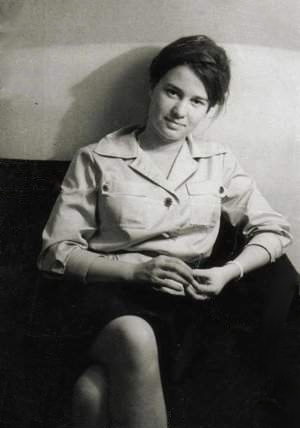
Ulrike Meinhof, 1964

"World War II was only twenty years earlier. Those in charge of the police, the schools, the government – they were the same people who'd been in charge under Nazism. The chancellor, Kurt Georg Kiesinger, had been a Nazi. People started discussing this only in the 60s. We were the first generation since the war, and we were asking our parents questions. Due to the Nazi past, everything bad was compared to the Third Reich. If you heard about police brutality, that was said to be just like the SS. The moment you see your own country as the continuation of a fascist state, you give yourself permission to do almost anything against it. You see your action as the resistance that your parents did not put up."

— Stefan Aust, author of Der Baader Meinhof Komplex

All four of the defendants charged with arson and endangering human life were convicted, for which they were sentenced to three years in prison. In June 1969, however, they were temporarily paroled under an amnesty for political prisoners, but in November of that year, the Federal Constitutional Court (Bundesverfassungsgericht) demanded that they return to custody. Only Horst Söhnlein complied with the order; the rest went underground and made their way to France, where they stayed for a time in a house owned by prominent French journalist and revolutionary Régis Debray, famous for his friendship with Che Guevara and the foco theory of guerrilla warfare. Eventually they made their way to Italy, where the lawyer Mahler visited them and encouraged them to return to Germany with him to form an underground guerrilla group.

The Red Army Faction was formed with the intention of complementing the plethora of revolutionary and radical groups across West Germany and Europe, as a more class conscious and determined force compared with some of its contemporaries. The members and supporters were already associated with the 'Revolutionary Cells' and 2 June Movement as well as radical currents and phenomena such as the Socialist Patients' Collective, Kommune 1, and the Situationists.

Baader was arrested again in April 1970, but on 14 May 1970 he was freed by Meinhof and others. Less than a month later, Gudrun Ensslin wrote an article in a West Berlin underground paper by the name of Agit883 (Magazine for Agitation and Social Practice), demanding a call to arms and a building of the Red Army. The article ended with the words, "Develop the class struggles. Organize the proletariat. Start the armed resistance!" Baader, Ensslin, Mahler, and Meinhof then went to Jordan, where they trained with Popular Front for the Liberation of Palestine (PFLP) and Palestine Liberation Organization (PLO) guerrillas and looked to the Palestinian cause for inspiration and guidance. But RAF organization and outlook were also partly modeled on the Uruguayan Tupamaros movement, which had developed as an urban resistance movement, effectively inverting Che Guevara's Mao-like concept of a peasant or rural-based guerrilla war and instead situating the struggle in the metropole or cities.

Many members of the RAF operated through a single contact or only knew others by their codenames. Actions were carried out by active units called 'commandos', with trained members being supplied by a quartermaster in order to carry out their mission. For more long-term or core cadre members, isolated cell-like organization was absent or took on a more flexible form.

In 1969 the Brazilian revolutionary Carlos Marighella published his Minimanual of the Urban Guerrilla. He described the urban guerrilla as:

... a person who fights the military dictatorship with weapons, using unconventional methods. ... The urban guerrilla follows a political goal, and only attacks the government, big businesses, and foreign imperialists.

The importance of small arms training, sabotage, expropriation, and a substantial safehouse/support base among the urban population was stressed in Marighella's guide. This publication was an antecedent to Meinhof's The Urban Guerrilla Concept and has subsequently influenced many guerrilla and insurgent groups around the globe. Although some of the Red Army Faction's supporters and operatives could be described as having an anarchist or libertarian communist slant, the group's leading members professed a largely Marxist–Leninist ideology. That said, they shied away from overt collaboration with communist states, arguing along the lines of the Chinese side in the Sino-Soviet split that the Soviet Union and its European satellite states had become traitors to the communist cause by, in effect if not in rhetoric, giving the United States a free pass in their exploitation of Third World populations and support of "useful" Third World dictators. Nevertheless, RAF members did receive intermittent support and sanctuary over the border in East Germany during the 1980s.

=== Anti-imperialism and public support ===
"The Baader–Meinhof Gang drew a measure of support that violent leftists in the United States, like the Weather Underground, never enjoyed. A poll at the time showed that a quarter of West Germans under forty felt sympathy for the gang and one-tenth said they would hide a gang member from the police. Prominent intellectuals spoke up for the gang's righteousness [as] Germany even into the 1970s was still a guilt-ridden society. When the gang started robbing banks, newscasts compared its members to Bonnie and Clyde. (Andreas) Baader, a charismatic action man indulged in the imagery, telling people that his favourite movies were Bonnie and Clyde, which had recently come out, and The Battle of Algiers. The pop poster of Che Guevara hung on his wall, [while] he paid a designer to make a Red Army Faction logo, a drawing of a machine gun against a red star."

— Stefan Aust, author of Der Baader Meinhof Komplex

When they returned to West Germany, they began what they called an "anti-imperialistic struggle", with bank robberies to raise money and bomb attacks against U.S. military facilities, German police stations, and buildings belonging to the Axel Springer press empire. In 1970, a manifesto authored by Meinhof used the name "RAF" and the red star logo with a Heckler & Koch MP5 submachine gun for the first time.

After an intense manhunt, Baader, Ensslin, Meinhof, Meins, and Raspe were eventually caught and arrested in June 1972.

== Custody and the Stammheim trial ==
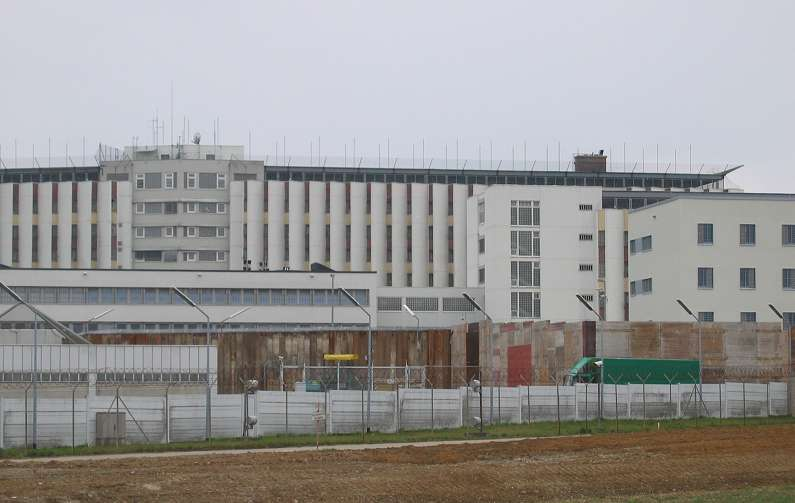
Stammheim Prison

After the arrest of the protagonists of the first generation of the RAF, they were held in solitary confinement in the newly constructed high security Stammheim Prison north of Stuttgart. When Ensslin devised an "info system" using aliases for each member (names deemed to have allegorical significance from Moby Dick), the four prisoners were able to communicate, circulating letters with the help of their defense counsel.

To protest against their treatment by authorities, they went on several coordinated hunger strikes; eventually, they were force-fed. Holger Meins died of self-induced starvation on 9 November 1974. After public protests, their conditions were somewhat improved by the authorities.

The so-called second generation of the RAF emerged at that time, consisting of sympathizers independent of the inmates. On 27 February 1975, Peter Lorenz, the CDU candidate for mayor of Berlin, was kidnapped by the 2 June Movement as part of pressure to secure the release of several non-RAF detainees, alongside estranged member Horst Mahler (who declined to be freed). Since none of these were on trial for murder, the state agreed, and those inmates (and later Lorenz himself) were released.

According to Aust, the success of this operation led to the RAF themselves to attempt their own exchange: on 24 April 1975, the West German embassy in Stockholm was seized by members of the RAF; two of the hostages were murdered as the German government under Chancellor Helmut Schmidt refused to give in to their demands. Two of the hostage-takers died from injuries they suffered when the explosives they planted detonated later that night.

On 21 May 1975, the Stammheim trial of Baader, Ensslin, Meinhof, and Raspe began, named after the district in Stuttgart where it took place. The Bundestag had earlier changed the Code of Criminal Procedure so that several of the attorneys who were accused of serving as links between the inmates and the RAF's second generation could be excluded.

On 9 May 1976, Ulrike Meinhof was found dead in her prison cell, hanging from a rope made from jail towels. An investigation concluded that she had hanged herself, a result hotly contested at the time, triggering a plethora of conspiracy theories. Alternative theories suggest that she took her life because she was being ostracized by the rest of the group. Her comrades consistently denied this hypothesis, repudiating alleged jailhouse recordings cited as evidence.

During the trial, more attacks took place. One of these was on 7 April 1977, when Federal Prosecutor Siegfried Buback, his driver, and his bodyguard were shot and killed by two RAF members while waiting at a red traffic light. Buback, who had been a Nazi member during WWII, was considered by RAF as one of the key persons for their trial. Among other things, two years earlier, while being interviewed by Stern magazine, he stated that "Persons like Baader don't deserve a fair trial." In February 1976, when interviewed by Der Spiegel he stated that "We do not need regulation of our jurisdiction, national security survives thanks to people like me and Herold [chief of BKA], who always find the right way".

Eventually, on 28 April 1977, the trial's 192nd day, the three remaining defendants were convicted of several murders, more attempted murders, and of forming a terrorist organization; they were sentenced to life imprisonment.

=== Security measures ===
A new section of Stammheim Prison was built especially for the RAF and was considered one of the most secure prison blocks around the world at the time. The prisoners were transferred there in 1975 (three years after their arrest). The roof and the courtyard were covered with steel mesh. During the night, the precinct was illuminated by 54 spotlights and twenty-three neon bulbs. Special military forces, including snipers, guarded the roof. Four hundred police officers along with the Federal Office for the Protection of the Constitution patrolled the building. The mounted police officers rotated on a double shift. One hundred more GSG-9 tactical police officers reinforced the police during the trial while BKA detectives guarded the front of the court area. Finally, helicopters overflew the area.

During the trial, accredited media correspondents had to pass a police road block 400 meters from the court. The police noted their data and the number-plate and photographed their cars. After that they had to pass three verification audits, and finally they were undressed and two judicial officials thoroughly searched their bodies. They were allowed to keep only a pencil and a notepad inside the court. Their personal items including their identity papers were withheld by the authorities during the trial. Every journalist could attend the trial only twice (two days). The Times questioned the possibility whether a fair trial could be conducted under these circumstances which involved siege-like conditions. Der Spiegel wondered whether that atmosphere anticipated "the condemnation of the defendants who were allegedly responsible for the emergency measures".

While the trial progressed, the prisoners received visits from lawyers (and on rare occasions relatives; friends were not allowed). For those visits, three jailers were always present to observe the conversations between prisoners and visitors. The prisoners were not allowed to meet each other inside the prison, until late 1975 when a regular meeting time was established (30 minutes, twice per day), during which they were guarded.

=== Trial ===
The judges and their pasts are considered important by supporters of the accused. Judge Weiss (Mahler's trial) had judged Joachim Raese (president of the Third Reich's court) as innocent seven times. When he threatened Meinhof that she would be put into a glass cage she answered caustically, "So you are threatening me with Eichmann's cage, fascist?" (Adolf Eichmann who was an Obersturmbannführer in the SS, was held inside a glass cage during his trial in Israel.) Siegfried Buback, the RAF's main trial judge in Stammheim, had been a Nazi Party member. Along with Federal Prosecutor Heinrich Wunder (who served as senior government official in the Ministry of Defense), Buback had ordered the arrest of Rudolf Augstein and other journalists regarding the Spiegel affair in 1962. Theodor Prinzing was accused by defense attorney Otto Schily of having been appointed arbitrarily, displacing other judges.

At several points in the Stammheim trial, microphones were turned off while defendants were speaking. They were often expelled from the hall, and other actions were taken. It was later revealed that the conversation they had between themselves as well as with their attorneys were recorded. Finally it was reported by both the defendants' attorneys and some of the prison's doctors that the physical and psychological state of the prisoners held in solitary confinement and white cells was such that they could not attend the long trial days and defend themselves appropriately. By the time the Stammheim trial began in early 1975, some of the prisoners had already been in solitary confinement for three years.

Two former members of the RAF, Karl-Heinz Ruhland and Gerhard Müller, testified under BKA's orders, as revealed later. Their statements were often contradictory, something that was also commented on in the newspapers. Ruhland himself later reported to Stern that his deposition was prepared in cooperation with police. Müller was reported to "break" during the third hunger strike in the winter of 1974–1975 which lasted 145 days. The prosecution offered him immunity for the murder of officer Norbert Schmidt in Hamburg (1971), and blamed Baader, Meinhof, Ensslin, and Raspe instead. He was eventually freed and relocated to the US after getting a new identity and 500,000 Deutsche Marks.

==== Lawyers' arrests ====
The government hastily approved several special laws for use during the Stammheim trial. Lawyers were excluded from trial for the first time since 1945, after being accused of various inappropriate actions, such as helping to form criminal organizations (Section 129, Criminal Law). The authorities invaded and checked the lawyers' offices for possible incriminating material. Minister of Justice Hans-Jochen Vogel boasted that no other Western state had such extensive regulation to exclude defense attorneys from a trial. Klaus Croissant, Hans-Christian Ströbele, Kurt Groenewold, who had been working preparing for the trial for three years, were expelled the second day of the trial. On 23 June 1975, Croissant, Ströbele (who had already been expelled), and Mary Becker were arrested, and in the meantime police invaded several defense attorneys' offices and homes, seizing documents and files. Ströbele and Croissant were remanded and held for four and eight weeks respectively. Croissant had to pay 80,000 Deutsche Marks and report weekly to a police station, and his transport and identity papers were seized.

The defense lawyers and prisoners were not the only ones affected by measures adopted for the RAF trial. On 26 November 1974 an unprecedented mobilization by police and GSG-9 units arrested 23 suspected RAF members, invaded dozens of homes, left-wing bookstores, and meeting places, and made arrests. No guerrillas were found. BKA's chief, Horst Herold stated that despite the fact that "large-scale operations usually don't bring practical results, the impression of the crowd is always a considerable advantage".

On 16 February 1979 Croissant was arrested (on the accusation of supporting a criminal organization – section 129) after France denied his request for political asylum, and was sentenced to a prison term of two and half years to be served in Stammheim prison.

=== Defense strategy ===
The general approach by defendants and their attorneys was to highlight the political purpose and characteristics of the RAF.

On 13 and 14 January 1976 the defendants readied their testimony (about 200 pages), in which they analyzed the role of imperialism and its fight against the revolutionary movements in the countries of the "third world". They also expounded the fascistization of West Germany and its role as an imperialistic state (in alliance with the U.S. over Vietnam). Finally they talked about the task of urban guerrillas and undertook the political responsibility for the bombing attacks. Finally their lawyers (following Ulrike Meinhof's proposal) requested that the accused be officially regarded as prisoners of war.

On 4 May (five days before Meinhof's death) the four defendants demanded to be allowed to provide data about the Vietnam War. They claimed that because the military intervention in Vietnam by the U.S. (and, indirectly, the FRG) had violated international law, the U.S. military bases in West Germany were justifiable targets of international retaliation. They requested several politicians (like Richard Nixon and Helmut Schmidt) as well as some former U.S. agents (who were willing to testify) to be called as witnesses.

Later when their requests were rejected, U.S. agents Barton Osbourne (ex-CIA, ex-member of the Phoenix Program), G. Peck (NSA), and Gary Thomas gave extensive interviews (organized by defense lawyers) on 23 June 1976 where they explained how FRG support was crucial for U.S. operations in Vietnam. Peck concluded that the RAF "was the response to criminal aggression of the U.S. government in Indochina and the assistance of the German government. The real terrorist was my government." Thomas presented data about the joint operations of FRG and U.S. intelligence organisations in Eastern Europe. He had also observed the Stammheim trial and referred to a CIA instructor teaching them how to make a murder look like a suicide. These statements were confirmed by the CIA case officer Philip Agee.

== Criminal acts ==
The RAF has been associated with various serious criminal acts (including bombings, kidnappings and murder) since their founding. The first criminal act attributed to the group after the student Benno Ohnesorg had been killed by a policeman in 1967 was the bombing of the Kaufhaus Schneider department store. On 2 April 1968, affiliates of the group firebombed the store and caused an estimated €1,339,908(in 2021) in property damage. Prominent members of the bombing included Andreas Baader and Gudrun Ensslin, two of the founders of the RAF. The bombs detonated at midnight when no one was in the store and no one was injured. As the bombs ignited, Gudrun Ensslin was at a nearby payphone, yelling to the German Press Agency, "This is a political act of revenge."

On 11 May 1972, the RAF placed three pipe bombs at a United States headquarters in Frankfurt. The bombing resulted in the death of a US officer and the injury of 13 other people. The stated reason for the bombing was a political statement in protest of US imperialism, specifically, a protest of US mining of North Vietnam harbours.

On 19 May 1972, members of the RAF armed five bombs in the Springer publishing house in Hamburg. Only three of the five bombs exploded, but 36 people were injured.

On 24 May 1972, two weeks after the bombing of the United States headquarters in Frankfurt, the group set off a car bomb at the IDHS (Intelligence Data Handling Service) Building at Campbell Barracks in Heidelberg. The bombing resulted in the deaths of three soldiers and the injury of five others.

On 10 November 1974, the group killed Günter von Drenkmann, the president of the state court of Berlin. The killing occurred after a string of events that led to a failed kidnapping by the 2 June Movement, a group that splintered off the RAF after the death of Holger Meins by hunger strike in prison.

Starting in February 1975 and continuing through March 1975, the 2 June Movement kidnapped Peter Lorenz, who at the time was the Christian Democratic candidate in the race for the mayor of West Berlin. In exchange for the release of Lorenz, the group demanded that several RAF and 2 June Movement members that were imprisoned for reasons other than violence be released from jail. The government obliged and released several of these members for the safe release of Lorenz.

On 24 April 1975, six members affiliated with the RAF seized the West German Embassy in Stockholm. The group took hostages and set the building to explode. They demanded the release of several imprisoned members of the RAF. The government refused the request, which led to the murder of two of the hostages. A few of the bombs that were intended to blow up the embassy prematurely detonated, which resulted in the death of two of the six RAF affiliates. The other four members eventually surrendered to the authorities.

In May 1975, several British intelligence reports circulated that stated that the RAF had stolen mustard gas from a joint U.S. and British storage facility. The reports also indicated that the RAF had intended to use the stolen gas in German cities. It eventually turned out that the mustard gas canisters were merely misplaced; however, the RAF still successfully capitalized on the news by frightening several different agencies.

In the 1970's, the RAF was involved in several raids, taking advantage of Switzerland's loosely guarded military armories. According to the source, the group was involved in the theft of 200 Swiss rifles, 500 revolvers, and 400 large grenades.

During the early 1980s, German and French newspapers reported that the police had raided an RAF safe house in Paris and had found a makeshift laboratory that contained flasks full of Clostridium botulinum, which makes botulinum toxin. These reports were later found to be incorrect; no such lab was ever found.

== German Autumn ==
On 30 July 1977, Jürgen Ponto, the head of Dresdner Bank, was shot and killed in front of his house in Oberursel in a botched kidnapping. Those involved were Brigitte Mohnhaupt, Christian Klar, and Susanne Albrecht, the sister of Ponto's goddaughter.

Following the convictions, Hanns Martin Schleyer, a former officer of the SS who was then President of the German Employers' Association (and thus one of the most powerful industrialists in West Germany), was abducted in a violent kidnapping. On 5 September 1977, Schleyer's convoy was stopped by the kidnappers reversing a car into the path of Schleyer's vehicle, causing the Mercedes in which he was being driven to crash. Once the convoy was stopped, five masked assailants immediately shot and killed three policemen and the driver and took Schleyer hostage. One of the group (Sieglinde Hofmann) produced her weapon from a pram she was pushing down the road.

A letter was then received by the federal government, demanding the release of eleven detainees, including those in Stammheim. A crisis committee was formed in Bonn, headed by Chancellor Helmut Schmidt, which, instead of acceding, resolved to employ delaying tactics to give the police time to discover Schleyer's location. At the same time, a total communication ban was imposed on the prison inmates, who were now allowed visits only from government officials and the prison chaplain.

The crisis dragged on for more than a month, while the Federal Criminal Police Office carried out its biggest investigation to date. Matters escalated when, on 13 October 1977, Lufthansa Flight 181 from Palma de Mallorca to Frankfurt was hijacked. A group of four PFLP members took control of the plane (which was named Landshut). The leader introduced himself to the passengers as "Captain Mahmud", and was later identified as Zohair Youssif Akache. When the plane landed in Rome for refueling, he issued the same demands as the Schleyer kidnappers, plus the release of two Palestinians held in Turkey and payment of US$15 million.

The Bonn crisis team again decided not to give in. The plane flew on via Larnaca, then Dubai, and then to Aden, where flight captain Jürgen Schumann, whom the hijackers deemed not cooperative enough, was brought before an improvised "revolutionary tribunal" and murdered on 16 October. His body was dumped on the runway. The aircraft again took off, flown by the co-pilot Jürgen Vietor, this time headed for Mogadishu, Somalia.

A high-risk rescue operation was led by Hans-Jürgen Wischnewski, then undersecretary in the chancellor's office, who had been secretly flown in from Bonn. At five past midnight CET on 18 October, the plane was stormed in a seven-minute assault by GSG 9, an elite unit of the German federal police. All four hijackers were shot; three of them died on the spot. None of the passengers were seriously hurt and Wischnewski was able to phone Schmidt and tell the Bonn crisis team that the operation had been a success.

=== "Stammheim Death Night" ===
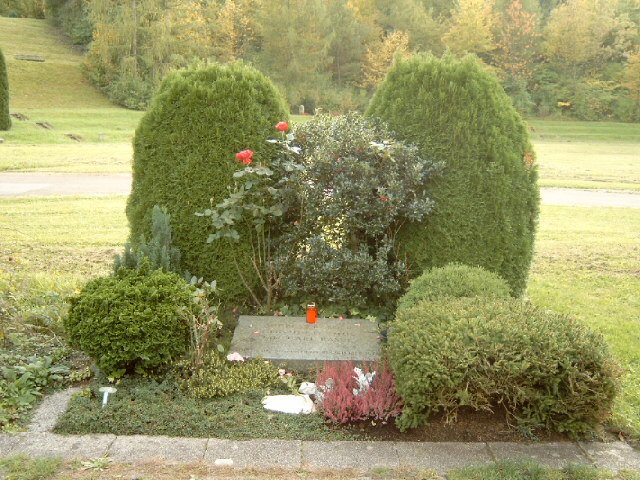
Burial site of Baader, Raspe and Ensslin

After the conclusion of the Landshut hostage crisis was announced in the late evening of 17 October, all the RAF members incarcerated in Stammheim were attacked the following night. Baader was shot in the head from a distance of thirty and forty centimetres. Gudrun Ensslin died by hanging. Irmgard Möller survived severe injury from a knife attack. The attacks went unnoticed until early next morning, at which time doctors were rushed in. Baader and Ensslin were already dead when found. Raspe was still alive and moved to the hospital where he died soon after. Möller recovered after being brought to a hospital. Authorities claimed that the prisoners – who had been held in isolation for weeks – learned of the failure of the hijacking through smuggled radio equipment, and coordinated the group suicide over an improvised electronic communication system between their maximum-security cells, which had been under surveillance during previous hostage crises.

The coordinated attempt sparked numerous conspiracy theories. It was alleged that the RAF members did not kill themselves, but instead were killed by the German authorities, the BND, CIA, the United States and NATO. These theories were spread by RAF supporters and sympathizers, and some were taken up by the mainstream press, with Möller maintaining later in her life that she was attacked. Available evidence shows that these suicides were planned and prepared for a long time by the RAF members.

On the very same day, Hanns-Martin Schleyer was shot to death by his captors en route to Mulhouse, France. On 19 October, Schleyer's kidnappers announced that he had been "executed" and pinpointed his location. His body was recovered later that day in the trunk of a green Audi 100 on Rue Charles Péguy. The French newspaper Libération received a letter declaring:

After 43 days we have ended Hanns-Martin Schleyer's pitiful and corrupt existence ... His death is meaningless to our pain and our rage ... The struggle has only begun. Freedom through armed, anti-imperialist struggle.

== RAF since the 1990s ==
The dissolution of the Soviet Union in late December 1991 was a serious blow to Leninist groups, but well into the 1990s attacks were still being committed under the name RAF. Among these were the killing of Ernst Zimmermann, CEO of MTU Aero Engines, a German engineering company; another bombing at the US Air Force's Rhein-Main Air Base (near Frankfurt), which targeted the base commander and killed two bystanders; a car bomb attack that killed Siemens executive Karl-Heinz Beckurts and his driver; and the shooting of Gerold von Braunmühl, a leading official at Germany's foreign ministry. On 30 November 1989, Deutsche Bank chairman Alfred Herrhausen was killed with a highly complex bomb when his car triggered a photo sensor in Bad Homburg. On 1 April 1991, Detlev Karsten Rohwedder, leader of the government Treuhand organization responsible for the privatization of the East German state economy, was shot and killed. The assassins of Zimmermann, von Braunmühl, Herrhausen, and Rohwedder were never reliably identified.

After German reunification in 1990, it was confirmed that the Stasi, the security and intelligence organization of East Germany, had been monitoring the RAF, and in the 1980s had provided ten ex-members shelter and new identities. This was already generally suspected at the time. In 1978 part of the group was exfiltrated through Yugoslavia to communist Poland to avoid a manhunt in Germany. Brigitte Mohnhaupt, Peter Boock, Rolf Wagner, and Sieglinde Hoffmann spent most of the year in facilities of the Polish Ministry of Public Security in Masuria, northeastern Poland, where they were also going through series of training programs along with others from Arab countries.

In 1992, the German government assessed that the RAF's main field of engagement now was missions to release imprisoned RAF members. To weaken the organization further the government declared that some RAF inmates would be released if the RAF refrained from violent attacks in the future. Subsequently, the RAF announced their intention to "de-escalate" and refrain from significant activity.

The last action taken by the RAF took place in 1993 with a bombing of a newly-built prison in Weiterstadt by overcoming the officers on duty and planting explosives. Although no one was seriously injured, this operation caused property damage amounting to 123 million Deutsche Marks (over 50 million euros).

The last big action against the RAF took place on 27 June 1993. An agent of the Federal Office for the Protection of the Constitution (the West German domestic intelligence agency) named Klaus Steinmetz had infiltrated the RAF. As a result, Birgit Hogefeld and Wolfgang Grams were arrested in Bad Kleinen. Grams and GSG 9 officer Michael Newrzella died during the mission. Due to a number of operational mistakes involving the various police services, German Minister of the Interior Rudolf Seiters took responsibility and resigned from his post.

Historians and the German authorities have much more clarity about the names and actions of the first and second generations of the RAF than is the case with the third generation. The lawyer and author Butz Peters describes the third generation of the RAF as a "black box": "The members had learned from the mistakes of the first and second generations. They were up to date with the latest forensic techniques. In addition, they were much more discreet in their actions. The first generations had many supporters and many members who at some point became soft. The third generation learned from this and lived very conspiratorially and insularly."

=== Dissolution ===
On 20 April 1998, an eight-page typewritten letter in German was faxed to the Reuters news agency, signed "RAF" with the machine-gun red star, declaring the group dissolved:

Almost 28 years ago, on 14 May 1970, during a liberation operation, the RAF formed. Today we end this project. The urban guerrilla in the form of the RAF is history now. (German: Vor fast 28 Jahren, am 14. Mai 1970, entstand in einer Befreiungsaktion die RAF. Heute beenden wir dieses Projekt. Die Stadtguerilla in Form der RAF ist nun Geschichte.)

In response to this statement, former BKA President Horst Herold said, "With this statement the Red Army Faction has erected its own tombstone."

=== Legacy ===
Horst Mahler, a founding RAF member, became a vocal Neo-Nazi and Holocaust denier later in life. In 2005, he was sentenced to six years in prison for incitement to racial hatred against Jews. He is on record as saying "Der Feind ist der Gleiche" ("The enemy is the same").

In 2007, amidst widespread media controversy, German president Horst Köhler considered pardoning RAF member Christian Klar, who had filed a pardon application several years before. On 7 May 2007, pardon was denied; regular (Note: In Germany, lifelong imprisoned convicts can apply for parole after 15 years – a period in this case extended by the court due to the number of crimes – which is to be granted whenever the convict's freedom is no longer dangerous to the public.) parole was later granted on 24 November 2008. RAF member Brigitte Mohnhaupt was granted release on five-year parole by a German court on 12 February 2007 and Eva Haule was released 17 August 2007.

In 2011, the last imprisoned RAF member, Birgit Hogefeld, was released on parole.

Police in Europe investigating the whereabouts of Ernst-Volker Staub, Burkhard Garweg and Daniela Klette stated that a search had been made in Spain, France and Italy. This followed reports that they could be hiding in the Netherlands in 2017 after being suspected of masterminding robberies in supermarkets and cash transit vehicles in Wolfsburg, Bremen and Cremlingen between 2011 and 2016. On 26 February 2024, Daniela Klette was arrested in Berlin; according to coverage in The Guardian, Klette's arrest followed an investigative TV report about the missing trio, which sparked 250 independent tips to local police about their whereabouts.

According to scholarly research into Stasi documents, RAF members in East Germany were trained and assisted by personnel from the Stasi Arbeitsgruppe des Ministers S.

== List of assaults attributed to the RAF ==
Date	Place	Action	Remarks	Photo
22 October 1971	Hamburg	Police officer killed	RAF members Irmgard Möller and Gerhard Müller attempted to rescue Margrit Schiller who was being arrested by the police for engaging in a shootout. Police sergeant Heinz Lemke was shot in the foot, while Sergeant Norbert Schmid, 33, was killed, becoming the first murder to be attributed to the RAF.	
22 December 1971	Kaiserslautern	Police officer killed	German Police officer Herbert Schoner, 32, was shot by members of the RAF in a bank robbery. The four militants escaped with 134,000 Deutsche Marks.	
11 May 1972	Frankfurt am Main	Bombing of US Army V Corps headquarters and the officers' mess' Terrace Club	US Army LTC Paul A. Bloomquist killed, 13 wounded	
12 May 1972	Augsburg and Munich	Bombing of a police station in Augsburg and the Bavarian State Criminal Investigations Agency in Munich	5 police-officers wounded. Claimed by the Tommy Weissbecker Commando.	
16 May 1972	Karlsruhe	Bombing of the car of the Federal Judge Buddenberg	His wife Gerta was driving the car and was wounded. Claimed by the Manfred Grashof commando.	
19 May 1972	Hamburg	Bombing of the Axel Springer Verlag. The building was not evacuated even though warnings about the bombing were made by the RAF.	17 wounded. Ilse Stachowiak was involved in the bombing.	
24 May 1972 18:10CET	Heidelberg	Bombing outside of Officers' Club followed by a second bomb moments later in front of Army Security Agency (ASA), U.S. Army in Europe (HQ USAREUR) at Campbell Barracks. Known involved RAF members: Irmgard Möller and Angela Luther, Andreas Baader, Ulrike Meinhof, Gudrun Ensslin, Holger Meins, Jan-Carl Raspe.	3 dead (Ronald A. Woodward, Charles L. Peck and Captain Clyde R. Bonner), 5 wounded. Claimed by 15 July Commando (in honour of Petra Schelm). Executed by Irmgard Moeller.	
24 April 1975	Stockholm, Sweden	West German embassy siege, murder of Andreas von Mirbach and Dr. Heinz Hillegaart	4 dead, of whom 2 were RAF members.	
7 May 1976	Sprendlingen near Offenbach	Police officer killed	22-year-old Fritz Sippel was shot in the head when checking an RAF member's identity papers.	
4 January 1977	Giessen	Attack against US 42nd Field Artillery Brigade at Giessen	In a failed attack against the Giessen army base, the RAF sought to capture or destroy nuclear weapons present. A diversionary bomb attack on a fuel tank failed to fully ignite the fuel.	
7 April 1977	Karlsruhe	Assassination of the federal prosecutor-general Siegfried Buback	The driver Wolfgang Göbel and judicial officer Georg Wurster were also killed. Claimed by the Ulrike Meinhof Commando. This murder case was brought up again after the 30-year commemoration in April 2007 when information from former RAF member Peter-Jürgen Boock surfaced in media reports.	
30 July 1977	Oberursel (Taunus)	Killing of Jürgen Ponto	The director of Dresdner Bank, Jürgen Ponto, is shot in his home during an attempted kidnapping. Ponto later dies from his injuries.	
5 September 1977 18 October 1977	Cologne resp. Mulhouse, France	Hanns Martin Schleyer, chairman of the German Employers' Association, is kidnapped and later shot	3 police-officers, Reinhold Brändle (41); Helmut Ulmer (24); Roland Pieler (20); and the driver Heinz Marcisz (41) are also killed during the kidnapping.	
22 September 1977	Utrecht, Netherlands	Police officer killed	Arie Kranenburg (46), Dutch policeman, shot and killed by RAF Knut Folkerts outside a bar.	
24 September 1978	A forest near Dortmund	Police officer killed	Three RAF members (Angelika Speitel, Werner Lotze, Michael Knoll) were engaged in target practice when they were confronted by police. A shootout followed where one policeman (Hans-Wilhelm Hans, 26) was shot dead, and one of the RAF members (Knoll) was wounded so badly that he later died from his injuries.	
1 November 1978	Kerkrade, Netherlands	Gun battle with four Dutch custom officials	Dionysius de Jong (19) was shot to death, and Johannes Goemanns (24) later died of his wounds, when they were involved in a gunfight with RAF members Adelheid Schulz and Rolf Heissler who were trying to cross the Dutch border illegally.	
25 June 1979	Mons, Belgium	Alexander Haig, Supreme Allied Commander of NATO, escapes an assassination attempt	A land mine blew up under the bridge on which Haig's car was traveling, narrowly missing Haig's car and wounding three of his bodyguards in a following car. In 1993 a German Court sentenced Rolf Clemens Wagner, a former RAF member, to life imprisonment for the assassination attempt.	
31 August 1981	Rhineland-Palatinate, Germany		Large car-bomb exploded in the HQ USAFE and HQ 4th ATAF parking lot of Ramstein Air Base	
15 September 1981	Heidelberg		Unsuccessful rocket propelled grenade attack against the car carrying the US Army's West German Commander Frederick J. Kroesen. Known involved RAF members: Brigitte Mohnhaupt, Christian Klar.	
2 July 1982	Nuremberg	Unsuccessful sniper attack against US Army Nuclear Storage Site NATO-23.	A family of four (two adults and two children) who were out hunting mushrooms, made their way through a broken fence the day after the sniper incident and were killed in an accidental shooting by members of the 3/17th Field Artillery Battalion, who were on high alert. They were guarding the NATO 2–3 Nuclear storage site at the time and had been fired upon several times the night before by Christian Klar, when two US soldiers had been slightly wounded and one killed.	
18 December 1984	Oberammergau, West Germany	Unsuccessful attempt to bomb a school for NATO officers. The car bomb was discovered and defused.	A total of ten incidents followed over the next month, against US, British, and French targets.	
1 February 1985	Gauting	Shooting	Ernst Zimmerman, head of the MTU is shot in the head in his home. Zimmermann died twelve hours later. The assassination was claimed by the Patsy O'Hara Commando.	
8 August 1985	Rhein-Main Air Base (near Frankfurt)	Rhein-Main Air Base bombing: A Volkswagen Passat exploded in the parking lot across from the base commander's building	Two people killed: Airman First Class Frank Scarton and Becky Bristol, a U.S. civilian employee who also was the spouse of a U.S. Air Force enlisted man. A granite monument marks the spot where they died. Twenty people were also injured. Army Spec. Edward Pimental was kidnapped and killed the night before for his military ID card which was used to gain access to the base. The French revolutionary organization Action Directe is suspected to have collaborated with the RAF on this attack. Birgit Hogefeld and Eva Haule have been convicted for their involvement in this event.	
9 July 1986	Straßlach (near Munich)		Shooting of Siemens manager Karl Heinz Beckurts and driver Eckhard Groppler	
10 October 1986	Bonn	Killing of Gerold Braunmühl	The senior diplomat of the German Foreign Office was shot by two people in front of his residence on Buchholzstraße.	
30 November 1989	Bad Homburg vor der Höhe	Bombing of the car carrying the chairman of Deutsche Bank Alfred Herrhausen (killed)	The case remained open for a long time, as the advanced explosive method employed baffled German prosecutors, as it could not have been the work of guerrillas like the RAF. Also, all suspects of the RAF were not charged due to alibis. However, the case received new light in late 2007 when German authorities learned that the Stasi, the former East German secret police, may have played a role in the assassination of Herrhausen, as the bombing method was exactly the same as one that had been developed by the Stasi.	
13 February 1991	Bonn	Sniper attack on U.S. embassy	Three Red Army Faction members fired a G1 automatic rifle from across the Rhine River at the U.S. Embassy Chancery. No one was hurt.	
1 April 1991	Düsseldorf	Assassination of Detlev Karsten Rohwedder, at his house in Düsseldorf	Rohwedder was the chief of the Treuhandanstalt, the agency that privatized the former East German enterprises after the German reunification.	
27 March 1993	Weiterstadt	Weiterstadt prison bombing: Attacks with explosives at the construction site of a new prison	Led to the capture of two RAF members three months later at a train station, and a shoot-out between RAF member Wolfgang Grams and a GSG 9 squad; GSG9 officer Michael Newrzella was killed before Grams allegedly was shot, while Birgit Hogefeld was arrested. Damage totaling 123 million Deutsche Marks (over 50 million euros). The attack caused a four-year delay in the completion of the site that was planned to open in 1993.	

== RAF Members ==
The following is a list of all known RAF Commando Units. Most RAF units were named after deceased RAF members, while others were named after deceased members of international militant left-wing groups such as the Black Panthers, Irish National Liberation Army, and the Red Brigades.

- 15 July Commando
- 2 June Commando
- Andreas Baader Commando
- Ciro Rizzato Commando
- George Jackson Commando
- Gudrun Ensslin Commando
- Holger Meins Commando
- Ingrid Schubert Commando
- Jan-Carl Raspe Commando
- José Manuel Sevillano Commando
- Katharina Hammerschmidt Commando
- Khaled Aker Commando
- Manfred Grashof Commando
- Mara Cagol Commando
- Patsy O'Hara Commando
- Petra Schelm Commando
- Siegfried Hausner Commando
- Sigurd Debus Commando
- Thomas Weissbecker Commando
- Ulrich Wessel Commando
- Ulrike Meinhof Commando
- Vincenzo Spano Commando
- Wolfgang Beer Commando

== In popular culture ==
=== Films ===
Numerous West German film and TV productions have been made about the RAF. These include Klaus Lemke's telefeature Brandstifter (The Arsonists, 1969); Volker Schloendorff and Margarethe von Trotta's co-directed The Lost Honour of Katharina Blum (a 1975 adaptation of Heinrich Böll's novel Die verlorene Ehre der Katharina Blum); Germany in Autumn (1978), co-directed by 11 directors, including Alexander Kluge, Volker Schloendorff, Rainer Werner Fassbinder, and Edgar Reitz; Fassbinder's Die dritte Generation (The Third Generation, 1979); Margarethe von Trotta's Die bleierne Zeit (The German Sisters/Marianne and Juliane, 1981); and Reinhard Hauff's Stammheim (1986). Post-reunification German films include Christian Petzold's Die innere Sicherheit (The State I Am In, 2000); Kristina Konrad's Grosse Freiheit, Kleine Freiheit (Greater Freedom, Lesser Freedom, 2000); and Christopher Roth's Baader (2002).

Uli Edel's 2008 The Baader Meinhof Complex (German: Der Baader Meinhof Komplex), based on the bestselling book by Stefan Aust, was nominated for Best Foreign Language Film in both the 81st Academy Awards and 66th Golden Globe Awards.

Outside Germany, films include Swiss director Markus Imhoof's Die Reise (The Journey) (1986). On TV, there was Heinrich Breloer's Todesspiel (Death Game) (1997), a two-part docu-drama, and Volker Schloendorff's Die Stille nach dem Schuss (The Legend of Rita) (2000).

There have been several documentaries: Im Fadenkreuz – Deutschland & die RAF (1997, several directors); Gerd Conradt's Starbuck Holger Meins (2001); Andres Veiel's Black Box BRD (2001); Klaus Stern's Andreas Baader – Der Staatsfeind (Enemy of the State) (2003); Ben Lewis's In Love With Terror, for BBC Four (2003); and Ulrike Meinhof – Wege in den Terror (Ways into Terror) (2006).

The 2010 feature documentary Children of the Revolution tells Ulrike Meinhof's story from the perspective of her daughter, journalist and historian Bettina Röhl, while Andres Veiel's 2011 feature film If Not Us, Who? provides a context for the RAF's origins through the perspective of Gudrun Ensslin's partner Bernward Vesper. In 2015, Jean-Gabriel Périot released his feature-length, found-footage documentary A German Youth on the Red Army Faction.

The 2018 remake of Suspiria features a secondary character attempting to run away to join the Red Army Faction, serving as a catalyst for the later events of the film.

=== Fiction and art ===
- Heinrich Böll's book The Lost Honour of Katharina Blum (1974) describes the political climate in West Germany during the active phase of the RAF in the seventies. Schlöndorff and Trotta (who knew the leading RAF cadre) filmed the book in 1975.
- Heldon, a French experimental electronic rock band, released a fundraising single entitled Soutien à la RAF (support to the RAF) with one track named Baader-Meinhof Blues
- Cabaret Voltaire, the industrial band from Sheffield, England, recorded "Baader-Meinhof" that pondered the group's importance in history and their motivations.
- The Norwegian painter Odd Nerdrum made a painting called The Murder of Andreas Baader in 1977–1978, that shows Nerdrum's personal commentary to the events in the Stammheim prison.
- Gerhard Richter, a German painter whose series of works entitled 18 October 1977 (1988) repainted photographs of the Faction members and their deaths.
- In 1990, the album Slap! by the British anarcho-punk band Chumbawamba featured a song titled "Ulrike", about Ulrike Meinhof and the RAF.
- Tom Clancy's 1991 novel The Sum of All Fears features the arrest of RAF members in former Eastern Bloc countries with the cooperation of the democratized Soviet Union at the end of the Cold War as a major plot point. In the book, embittered RAF terrorists ally with the Democratic Front for the Liberation of Palestine to procure a lost Israeli atomic bomb to start a nuclear war. After the nuclear detonation on U.S soil, the RAF attempts to launch a ground war in Berlin with a battalion of commandeered tanks, but are wiped out in a matter of hours by the armed forces of a reunified Germany.
- Christoph Hein's novel In seiner frühen Kindheit ein Garten (In His Early Childhood, a Garden) deals with a fictionalized aftermath of the Grams shooting in 1993.
- Josef Žáček, a Czech painter, created a series of paintings entitled Searching in Lost Space 1993 that were inspired by events that had occurred in 1993 in Bad Kleinen.
- In 1996, British singer songwriter Luke Haines released a 9-track album titled Baader Meinhof. In this concept album, all songs are a romanticized retelling of the RAF actions.
- Bruce LaBruce's 2004 film The Raspberry Reich is an erotic satire of the RAF and of terrorist chic.
- In 2003, The Long Winters released the song "Cinnamon", about the RAF.
- In 2004, Canadian singer–songwriter Neil Leyton composed and released a song entitled "Ingrid Schubert".
- Australian–British playwright Van Badham's play Black Hands/Dead Section provides a fictionalized account of the actions and lives of key members of the RAF. It won the Queensland Premier's Literary Awards in 2005.
- The 2005 feature film See You at Regis Debray, written and directed by C. S. Leigh, tells the story of the time Andreas Baader spent hiding in the apartment of Régis Debray in Paris in 1969.
- The 2011 album Amok by German band Weena Morloch features the song "Die Nacht der Stumpfen Messer" ("The Night of Blunt Knives", a play on the Night of the Long Knives) which deals with Andreas Baader's and Gudrun Ensslin's death in prison.

=== Science ===
- The Red Army Faction is the inspiration and namesake for the Baader–Meinhof phenomenon, also known as the frequency illusion, a cognitive bias in which a person notices a specific concept, word, or product more frequently after recently becoming aware of it. The name was coined in a 1994 letter to the St. Paul Pioneer Press in which the writer described repeatedly noticing the name of the gang after mentioning it once.

== See also ==
- Trial of Lina E.
- Revolutionary Cells (German group)
- Japanese Red Army
- Revolutionary Organization 17 November
- Red triangle (badge)
- Reichstag fire (Marinus van der Lubbe)

== Biography ==
=== Primary ===
==== English ====
- Fundamental texts of the RAF (2023), trans. Camille Akmut.

=== Secondary ===
- Passmore, Leith (2011). Ulrike Meinhof and the Red Army Faction. Performing Terrorism. London: Palgrave Macmillan. ISBN 978-0-23033-747-3.
- Scribner, Charity (2014). After the Red Army Faction. Gender, Culture, and Militancy. Columbia University Press. ISBN 978-0-23116-864-9.
- Smith, J.; Moncourt, André (2009). Projectiles for the People. The Red Army Faction, A Documentary History. Vol. 1. PM Press. ISBN 978-1-60486-029-0.
- Vague, Tom (2001). Televisionaries: The Red Army Faction Story, 1963–1993. AK Press. ISBN 978-1873176474.
- Winkler, Willi (2005). Die Geschichte der RAF (in German). Berlin: Rowohlt. ISBN 3-87134-510-5.
- Kraushaar, Wolfgang (2006). Die RAF und der linke Terrorismus (in German). Hamburg: Edition Hamburg. ISBN 3-936096-65-1.
