= Josef Bachmann =

German criminal (1944–1970)

- Born: Josef Erwin Bachmann; 12 October 1944; Reichenbach im Vogtland, Saxony, Germany
- Died: 24 February 1970 (aged 25)
- Cause of death: Suicide by asphyxiation
- Known for: Assassination attempt on Rudi Dutschke
- Penalty: 7 years in prison

Josef Erwin Bachmann (12 October 1944 – 24 February 1970) became widely known in Germany for his assassination attempt on the Marxist activist Rudi Dutschke, firing three bullets at him, on 11 April 1968. Bachmann was convicted of the attack and sentenced to seven years in prison. He committed suicide in 1970 while serving his sentence.

== Early life ==
Bachmann was born on 12 October 1944 in Reichenbach im Vogtland, Saxony and grew up in East Germany in a family situation that had been described as difficult. In 1956, he left East Germany with his mother for West Germany and settled in Peine, Lower Saxony. Considered a poor student, he began to finance his lifestyle with a series of break-ins. He moved around frequently and changed jobs multiple times. In 1966, he was convicted for break-ins he committed in France.

In 1968, Bachmann moved to Munich, searching for work. While in Munich, he had heard of the assassination of Martin Luther King Jr. This inspired him to assassinate Dutschke, whom he disliked for "being a communist".

In 2009, it emerged that Bachmann had contact with an active cell of neo-Nazis in Peine starting in 1961 and that he participated in shooting practice with them.

== Attack ==
Bachmann left his place of work in Munich on 10 April 1968 and travelled by train to Berlin. On his departure, he told his fellow workers that they would hear about him in the media soon.

On the afternoon of 11 April, Bachmann approached the residence of Dutschke on Kurfürstendamm 140. Seeing Dutschke leaving the building at around 4:35 pm, Bachmann approached him, inquiring if he was Rudi Dutschke. On Dutschke's confirmation, Bachmann pulled his gun and shot him with three bullets, calling him a "dirty communist pig".

Bachmann fled the scene, leaving the seriously injured Dutschke behind. Bachmann went into hiding in a nearby basement, where police tracked him down. Following a shootout with police, he was arrested. Before his arrest, Bachmann attempted to kill himself with sleeping pills. He was taken to a hospital to deal with the poisoning.

== Aftermath ==
Bachmann confessed to the assassination attempt and was convicted and sentenced to seven years in prison in 1969.

In the attempt on his life, Dutschke suffered brain damage and had to learn to speak again. Being aware that Bachmann had attempted to kill himself, Dutschke started to converse with Bachmann in a series of letters. In this exchange, Dutschke characterised suicide as cowardly. Bachmann apologised for what he had done to Dutschke.

In the night of 23–24 February 1970, Bachmann committed suicide by suffocating himself with a plastic bag.

== In media ==
Bachmann was portrayed by Tom Schilling in the 2008 film The Baader Meinhof Complex.
