= Rolf Clemens Wagner =

German terrorist (1944–2014)

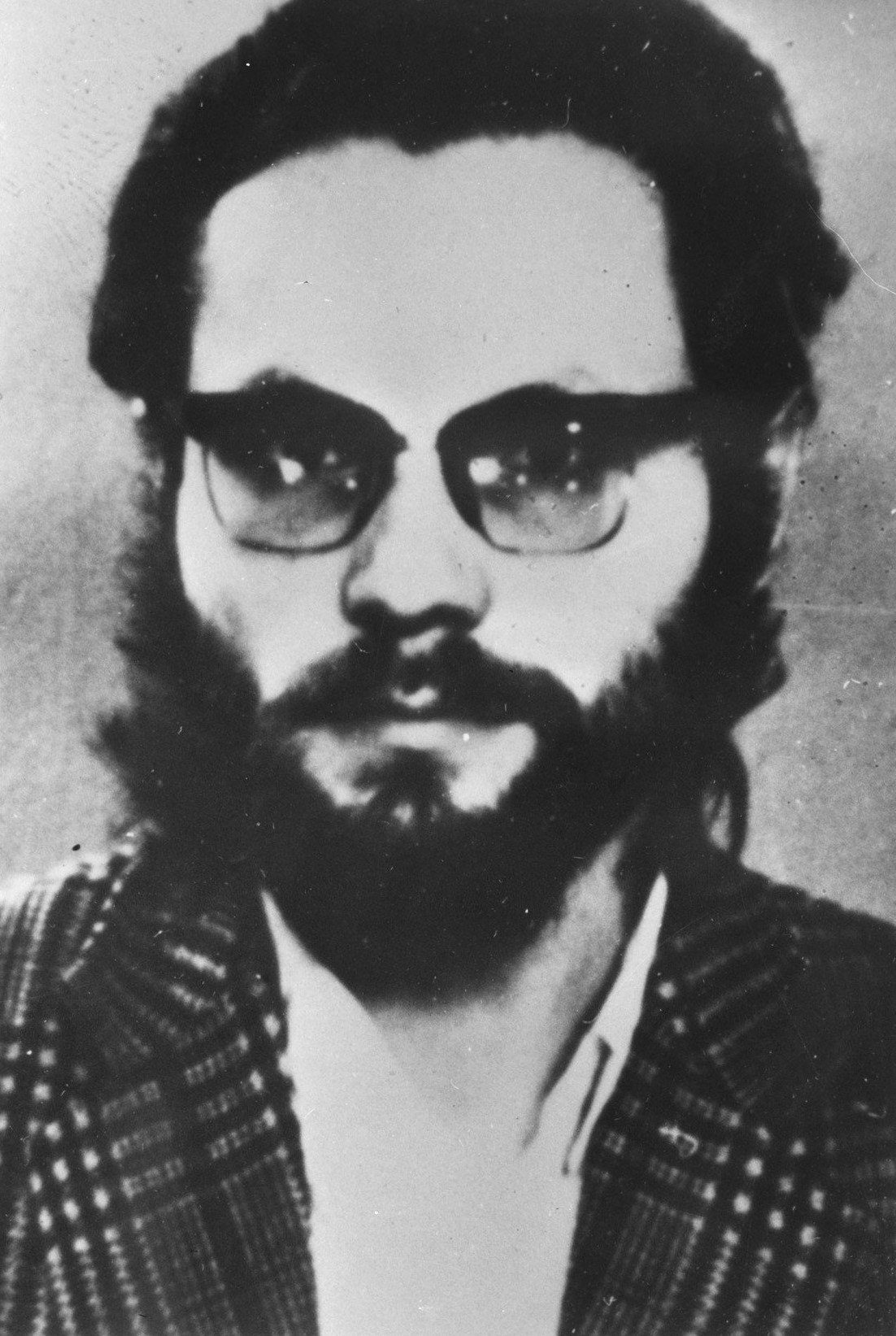
- Clemens Wagner in 1977
- Born: 30 August 1944; Hohenelbe, Reichsgau Sudetenland, Nazi Germany
- Died: 11 February 2014 (aged 69); Bochum, Germany
- Organization: Red Army Faction

Rolf Clemens Wagner (30 August 1944 – 11 February 2014) was a German terrorist. He was member of the left wing terrorist organisation Red Army Faction (RAF).

== Terrorism ==
Wagner carried out most of his terrorists actions in the 1970s, and became an active member of the second generation RAF. Some of the major points of his terrorist career are listed below;

- Suspected active role in the kidnap-murder of Hanns-Martin Schleyer, September 1977.
- In May 1978, Wagner was arrested in Yugoslavia (alongside Brigitte Mohnhaupt, Peter-Jurgen Boock and Sieglinde Hofmann), and faced extradition to West Germany. He was released however, and allowed to travel to a country of his choice because West Germany turned down an offer from Yugoslavia to extradite them in exchange for eight Croatian political fugitives in West Germany. It is thought that Wagner travelled to Yemen.
- In June 1979 Wagner took part in the failed assassination attempt on NATO Commander Alexander Haig.
- In November later that year, he was involved in a bank raid in a branch of Schweizerische Volksbank, where a policeman was shot and seriously injured, and an innocent bystander (housewife Edith Kletzhandler) died when she was hit in the throat by a ricocheting bullet.

On 19 November 1979, Wagner was arrested in Zurich.

== Imprisonment and release ==
Wagner was extradited to West Germany, and in 1985 he was sentenced to two life terms in prison for murder. His sentence was extended however when another RAF member, Werner Lotze, made a statement implicating Wagner in the Haig attack, and he was sentenced to another 12 years imprisonment.

In 2003 president Johannes Rau pardoned Wagner, who was then 59 and suffering from ill-health.

Wagner caused controversy again in October 2007 when he made a statement about his previous crimes:

In retrospect, many of our decisions seem correct even today. Take, for example, the decision to kidnap Hanns-Martin Schleyer. He, with his SS history, acting as the business leader in the occupied zones and in his new role as strong-arm and President of the Employers Association; we didn't choose him by chance.

Many members of German society were outraged at Wagner's remarks, such as Rupert Scholz, the former Federal Minister of Defense who called for Wagner to be charged with “speech encouraging criminality.”
