= Petra Schelm =

Founding member of Rote Armee Fraktion (RAF)

- Born: 16 August 1950; Hamburg, West Germany
- Died: 15 July 1971 (aged 20); Hamburg, West Germany
- Cause of death: Gunshot wounds
- Organization: Red Army Faction

Petra Schelm (died 1971) was a German founding member of the Red Army Faction (RAF). She trained as an urban guerilla in Jordan and was killed in a shootout with the police in Hamburg in July 1971.

== Early life and RAF ==
Petra Schelm grew up in West Berlin and worked as a hairdresser. She started a relationship with Manfred Grashof and the two lived together on Bleibtreustrasse in Charlottenburg. The apartment was used as a distribution hub for the anarchist newspaper Agit 883.

In 1970, Schelm was a founding member of the Red Army Faction (RAF), a far-left militant group. In June 1970, she travelled on false identification to Beirut with Brigitte Asdonk, Hans-Jurgen Backer, Monika Berberich, Grashof and Horst Mahler. From there, the group went to Jordan to attend urban guerilla training at a Popular Front for the Liberation of Palestine (PLFP) facility. They were joined by Andreas Baader, Gudrun Ensslin and Ulrike Meinhof.

== Roadblock and death ==
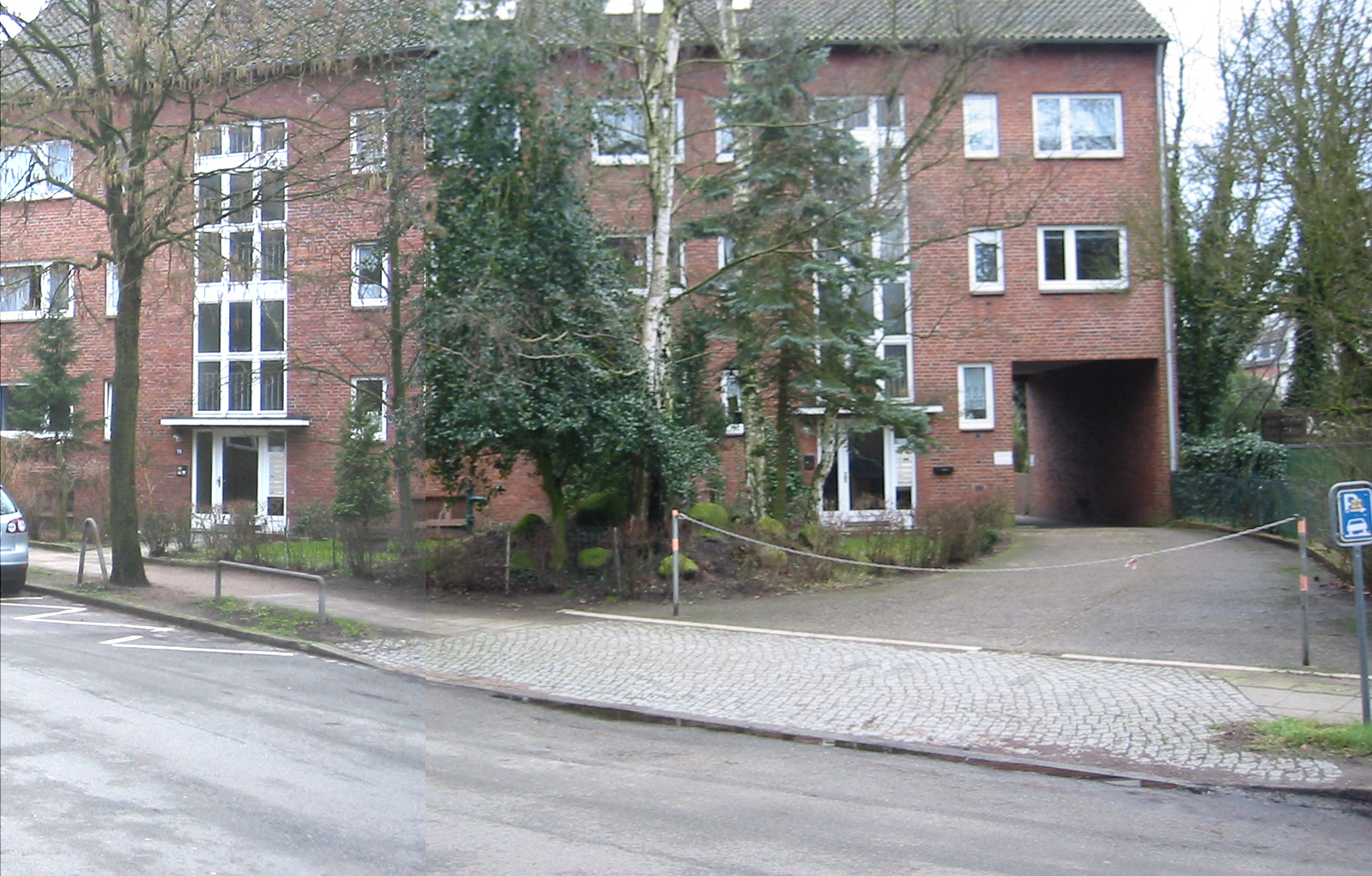
House in Reineckestraße in Hamburg where the fatal shooting occurred

On 15 July 1971, Schelm was driving through Hamburg with Werner Hoppe in a stolen BMW when she avoided a police roadblock. The police gave chase and stopped the BMW. Hoppe stepped out of the car and shot at police officers, before escaping; Schelm fired at police and was shot dead. (Note: Jillian Becker states that Schelm was killed by a burst of gunfire from a submachine gun; Stefan Aust states that it was a single bullet wound to the head that killed Schelm.) A police helicopter chased Hoppe and he was arrested.

Schelm was buried at Spandau cemetery in West Berlin. At her funeral, fifty supporters laid a red flag on her grave, which was removed by the police.

== Legacy ==
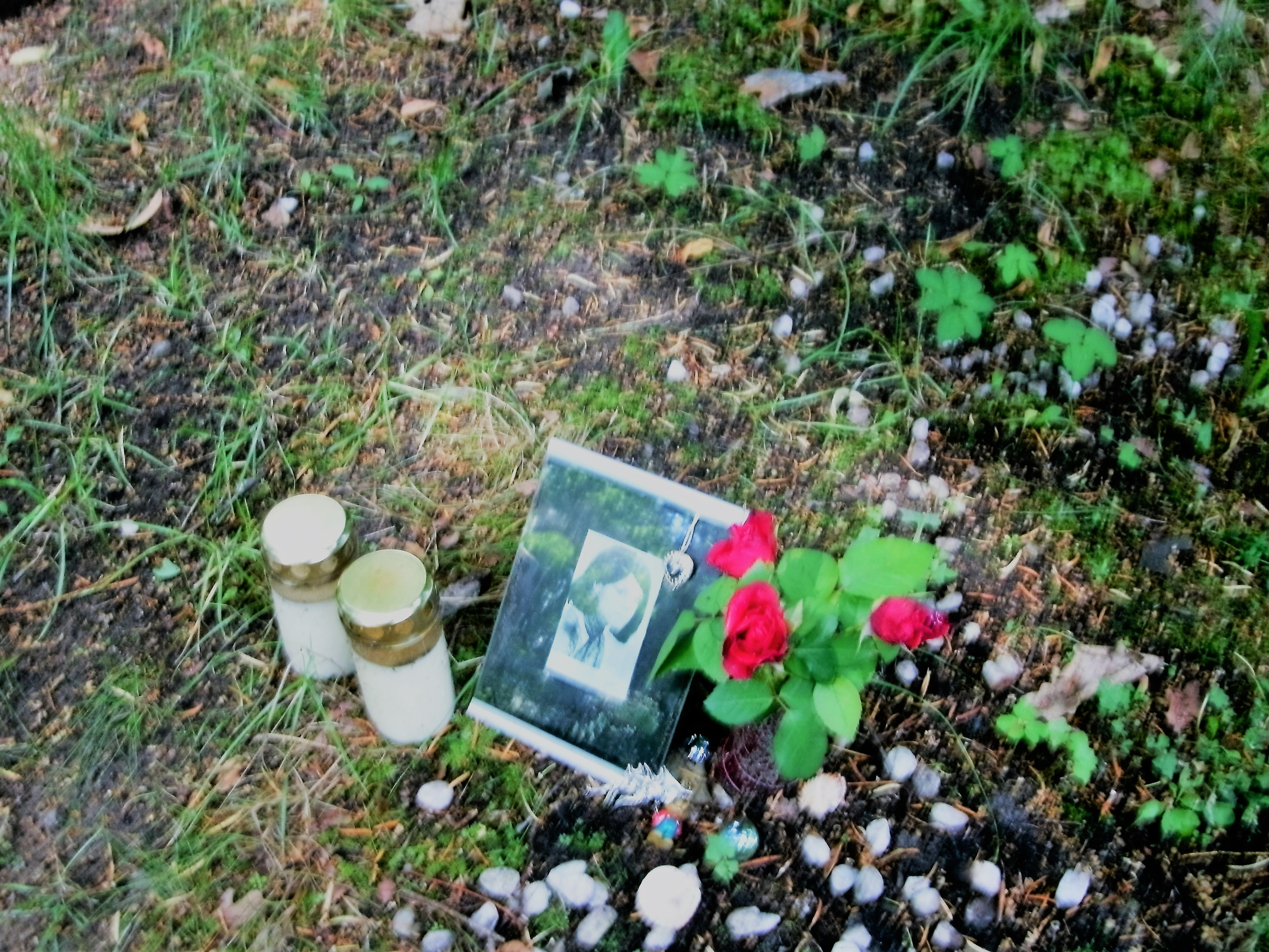
Grave of Petra Schelm

The Petra Schelm Commando of the RAF bombed the Frankfurt headquarters of the United States V Corps on 11 May 1972, in support of North Vietnam. A lieutenant colonel died and 13 other soldiers were injured. The cost of repairs to the building was calculated to be DM 1,000,000 (or $310,000 at the time).
