= Brigitte Mohnhaupt =

German terrorist (born 1949)

- Born: Brigitte Margret Ida Mohnhaupt; 24 June 1949 (age 77); Rheinberg, West Germany
- Organization(s): Socialist Patients' Collective, Red Army Faction, Tupamaros West-Berlin

Brigitte Margret Ida Mohnhaupt (born 24 June 1949) is a German convicted former terrorist associated with the second generation of the Red Army Faction (RAF) members. She was also part of the Socialist Patients' Collective (SPK). From 1971 until 1982 she was active within the RAF.

== Early life ==
Mohnhaupt was born in Rheinberg, North Rhine-Westphalia, the daughter of an employee in a publishing house. After her parents' divorce in 1960, she stayed with her mother. She took her abitur in 1967 in Bruchsal, and later that year enrolled with the philosophy department at LMU Munich. She was married to Rolf Heissler from 1968 to 1970. While in Munich, she joined the local commune scene, where she met core figures of the 1960s student movement such as Rainer Langhans, Fritz Teufel and Uschi Obermaier. In 1969, she participated in a demonstration in the USA cultural centre in Munich (Amerikahaus) to protest against the Vietnam War. She was reportedly influenced by Carlos Marighella's Manual of the Urban Guerilla.

== Activities as a member of the RAF ==
Mohnhaupt was first a member of the Socialist Patients' Collective, known by its German acronym, SPK. Together with fellow commune member Irmgard Möller, she joined the Red Army Faction (RAF) around 1971 after the SPK dissolved, and helped with organization, logistics, and weapon procurement. Below is a timeline of Mohnhaupt's major acts as a member of the RAF.

- 9 June 1972: Mohnhaupt was arrested in Berlin in connection with the RAF and sentenced to prison for involvement with a criminal organization, identity document forgery, and illegal weapon possession.
- Shortly after Ulrike Meinhof's death in prison in 1976, Mohnhaupt was, on her own request, transferred to Stammheim Prison where the majority of other RAF prisoners were held captive. In Stammheim Prison she met Gudrun Ensslin, Andreas Baader, and Jan-Carl Raspe, and was reportedly trained by them to become a leader of the RAF.
- She was released on 8 February 1977, and immediately went underground and continued her work with the RAF.
- Mohnhaupt was a major player in the German Autumn: she was involved in the 1977 assassinations of chief federal prosecutor Siegfried Buback in Karlsruhe and banker Jürgen Ponto, chairman of the Dresdner Bank board of directors, in Oberursel, Taunus. She was also involved in the kidnapping and murder of employer representative Hanns Martin Schleyer.
- 11 May 1978 Mohnhaupt, Sieglinde Hofmann, Rolf Clemens Wagner, and Peter-Jürgen Boock were arrested in Zagreb, Yugoslavia.
- 17 November 1978 – Mohnhaupt and three other RAF members were allowed to leave Yugoslavia for a country of their choice because West Germany turned down an offer from Yugoslavia to extradite them in exchange for eight Croatian political fugitives in West Germany.
- 15 September 1981 Mohnhaupt took part in an assassination attempt on U.S. General Frederick Kroesen using an RPG-7 anti-tank rocket.

== Arrest and imprisonment ==
On 11 November 1982 Mohnhaupt, along with Adelheid Schulz, was caught entering an RAF arms cache in the woods near Frankfurt which had been staked out by GSG 9 men. Mohnhaupt was detained and sentenced to life in prison with a minimum 24-year mandatory sentence by the appellate court of Stuttgart. She was given this sentence because of the significant role she played during the German Autumn and for her part in the attempted assassination of NATO General Kroesen. The court considered her a leading figure of the RAF, but could not determine whether she had personally been involved in any of the murders. After her conviction, Mohnhaupt declared that the RAF would continue to fight.

Her arrest was a massive blow to the RAF (as she had become almost as important to her RAF 'generation' as Gudrun Ensslin and Andreas Baader had been to theirs).

On 12 February 2007 amidst widespread media controversy, the appellate court of Stuttgart gave Mohnhaupt parole effective of 27 March 2007. She routinely qualified for early release after serving her mandatory sentence. Parole was granted since she was no longer a danger to society according to a psychological expert and the Federal Attorney General. Unlike other RAF members, Mohnhaupt had never applied for clemency.

She was released from Aichach prison on 25 March 2007.

== Political debate surrounding her release ==
Many German politicians were in favour of clemency towards Mohnhaupt. Former Justice minister Klaus Kinkel of the Free Democratic Party (Germany) (FDP) had pleaded in favour of a "second chance"; former president of the Bundestag Wolfgang Thierse (Social Democratic Party of Germany) declared that "expiation" has taken place, and Green member Antje Vollmer stated that Mohnhaupt and fellow RAF member Christian Klar "have been in prison longer than any Nazi criminal." Conversely, Konrad Freiberg, president of the police union, who had seen ten of his officers killed by the RAF, and Bavarian Interior Minister Günther Beckstein opposed her release. However, Gerhart Baum (FDP), Federal Interior Minister from 1978 to 1982, was in favor of her release, as it would show that she was treated in the same way as other prisoners, being released after having served all 24 years of her mandatory sentence. According to weekly Die Zeit, keeping her in prison would signify that the state was confirming the terrorists' view of themselves as political prisoners.

== Bibliography ==
- Becker, Jillian. Hitler's Children: The Story of the Baader-Meinhof Terrorist Gang, DIANE Publishing Company 1998, ISBN 0-7881-5472-9 or Panther edition 1978, ISBN 0-586-04665-8
- Jon Dough and Red Army Faction, The Urban Guerilla Concept, Kersplebedeb; Pamphlet edition (4 April 2005), ISBN 1-894946-16-2, ISBN 978-1-894946-16-2
- Tom Vague, Televisionaries: The Red Army Faction Story, 1963–1993, AK Press; Rev Update edition (August 1994), ISBN 1-873176-47-3, ISBN 978-1-873176-47-4
- Baumann, Bommi, How It All Began: The Personal Account of a West German Urban Guerrilla, Arsenal Pulp Press; Reissue edition (June 1977), ISBN 0-88978-045-5, ISBN 978-0-88978-045-3
- Astrid Proll, Baader Meinhof, Pictures on the Run (Hans und Grete, Bilder der RAF), Aufbau Verlag, ISBN 978-3-931141-84-4 (Oct 1998)
- "Mohnhaupt kommt nach 24 Jahren frei". Spiegel Online. 12 February 2007.
