= Susanne Albrecht =

Former member of the Red Army Faction

- Born: 1 March 1951 (age 75); Hamburg, West Germany
- Other name: Ingrid Jäger
- Organization: Red Army Faction

Susanne Albrecht (born 1 March 1951) is a former member of the Red Army Faction.

== Early life ==
Albrecht was the daughter of a successful maritime lawyer, and spent her childhood living in a wealthy suburb of Hamburg. She did not fit in well in public school, and was later sent to a private school in Holzminden. In 1971 she attended the University of Hamburg where she studied sociology, and it was around this time that she became interested in Marxism. She joined several political groups and a squatters group before moving into an apartment with Karl-Heinz Dellwo. She also began to mingle with some Red Army Faction (RAF) members, such as Ilse Stachowiak, to whom she sometimes gave her ID papers.

In 1974, along with Dellwo and a few other people who all later became involved with the RAF, she joined the Committee Against the Torture of Political Prisoners in West Germany, which protested against the conditions that several imprisoned RAF terrorists were living in.

In Hamburg, she rented an apartment with six other people which had no shower or bath. She was known to have said about her former home-life; "I was sick of pigging out on caviar and smoked salmon." She, along with Sigrid Sternebeck and Silke Maier-Witt (who were collectively known as the Hamburg Aunties), became very important to the left-wing scene and Albrecht began to further strengthen her connection to the RAF.

== Terrorism ==
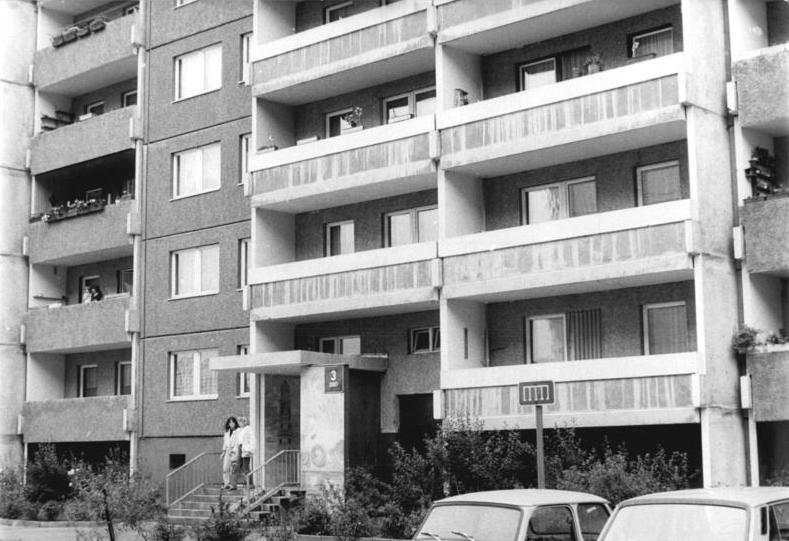
In this apartment at the Rosenbecker Straße Nr. 3 in Marzahn Susanne Albrecht was arrested in 1990. She had lived there since 1989 under the name Ingrid Jäger with husband and child.

- In July 1977, Albrecht visited her sister's godfather Jürgen Ponto, chairman of the Dresdner Bank, with whom her family was on such close terms that she called him "Uncle Jürgen". She was accompanied by Brigitte Mohnhaupt and Christian Klar. Together they attempted to kidnap Ponto, but once he resisted he was shot by Mohnhaupt and Klar and murdered. A communique was issued after Ponto's murder, signed by Albrecht, which read

it had not been clear to us that these people, who start wars in the Third World and destroy entire populations, are dumbfounded when violence faces them in their own house.

- Between 1978 and 1979, Albrecht travelled to Yemen, where she trained in guerilla warfare in a Palestinian training camp.
- In June 1979, Albrecht, alongside Werner Lotze and Rolf Clemens Wagner, attempted to assassinate NATO commander-in-chief Alexander Haig in Mons, Belgium, by detonating explosives near his car. The attempt failed, however, and Haig was not injured as the bomb exploded too late.
- In 1980, Albrecht fled to the German Democratic Republic where she was protected by the Stasi and given a new identity.

== Arrest and imprisonment ==
In East Germany, Albrecht worked as an English translator under the name Ingrid Jäger, and married a scientist, with whom she had a son. Neither knew of her past. She lived in Köthen, but in 1986 she was recognised when West German television reports were broadcast regarding information on the RAF, prompting her to move to Berlin. However, when Germany was reunified she was found living as a housewife under the name "Becker" and was arrested, the first of eight arrests in a ten-day period, in front of her apartment on 6 June 1990. She was sentenced to twelve years imprisonment by the upper state court in Stuttgart. However, she had served only half her term when she was paroled in 1996.

Albrecht has been working as a German language teacher to immigrant children in a Bremen primary school under an assumed name.
