= Horst Herold =

German police officer (1923–2018)

President of the Federal Criminal Police Office of Germany
- In office 1971 – March 1981
- Preceded by: Paul Dickopf
- Succeeded by: Heinrich Boge

Personal details
- Born: 21 October 1923 Sonneberg, Germany
- Died: 14 December 2018 (aged 95) Nuremberg, Germany
- Profession: Police officer

Horst Herold (21 October 1923 – 14 December 2018) was a German police officer. He was the President of the Federal Criminal Police of West Germany from 1971 to 1981. Under his leadership, the method for the systematic manhunt of Red Army Faction terrorists, called Rasterfahndung (dragnet), was introduced. He authored several essays on policing. He died on 14 December 2018.

== Early life ==
Herold was born and grew up in Sonneberg, Thuringia, until his family relocated to Nuremberg in 1930.

In World War II, Herold served as a lieutenant in the combat unit Großdeutschland, where he was severely wounded in 1943. Herold was taken prisoner by the Soviets in northern Bohemia on 9 May 1945, from which he managed to escape.

After studying law at University of Erlangen–Nuremberg from 1945 to 1951, Herold received his doctorate in international law with his 1951 dissertation The defective legal transactional act of state in international law.

Herold was originally left-leaning, believing dialectical materialism to be the true part of Marxism. As a child, he participated in the communist youth movement. During his tertiary studies, he was a member of the Socialist German Student Union (SDS) and active in the extra-parliamentary movement against West German rearmament. Herold was a member of the Social Democratic Party of Germany.

== Career ==
In 1952, Horst Herold became a judicial assessor (Gerichtsassessor) at the public prosecutor's office (Staatsanwaltchaft). In 1953, he was appointed public prosecutor, with Hans Sachs as his superior. In 1964, Herold became head of the Nuremberg Criminal Investigation Department. Three years later, he assumed the position of Nuremberg Police Chief. From 1969 to 1971, Herold was a member of a reform commission for the Federal Criminal Police Office (BKA), or Bundeskriminalamt.

On September 1, 1971, he was appointed President of the Federal Criminal Police Office (BKA). During his tenure until 1981, he subjected the BKA to a reform process that was intended to make it the global flagship of the German police. In particular, he successfully advanced the expansion of technical and personnel resources. At the same time, this resulted in the centralization of the criminal police in the elements of forensic science, its own criminological research, and the development of new criminological approaches, contrary to the historical legislator's intentions.

In 1977, Herold was awarded the Icelandic Order of the Falcon and German Kommandeur mit Stern ("commander with star", the second-highest order of merit), after introducing the Icelandic police to a retired BKA officer to help solve the Guðmundur and Geirfinnur case. In this case, five men were convicted of murder after being forced to confess under torture-like conditions. In September 2018, 44 years after the alleged crime, all defendants were acquitted by the Icelandic Supreme Court.

Under the leadership of Horst Herold, dragnet searches were introduced as part of the domestic fight against Red Army Faction terror.

== Retirement and later life ==
After heated disagreements with Gerhart Baum (FDP), president of the Federal Ministry of the Interior who had been in office since 8 June 1978, Herold applied for early retirement following a heart attack in September 1980. Horst Herold was granted early retirement on 31 March 1981, at the age of 57.

His plan to write a book about the manhunt for the RAF failed, as Baum denied him access to the files. Because the police authorities felt unable to adequately protect Herold, he was forced to move from his home in Nuremberg to the grounds of a former BGS barracks in Rosenheim, where a prefabricated house was built for him. He lived there as a pensioner and had to cover the costs himself. In this context, the quote "I am the last prisoner of the RAF" is attributed to him. After the death of his wife, he returned to Nuremberg in 2017. Herold died in December 2018 after a short, serious illness at the age of 95.

== In media ==
- In the TV documentary drama Todesspiel (1997, directed by Heinrich Breloer) about the German Autumn, Herold was portrayed by the actor Dieter Mann.
- In the film Baader (2002), Herold (here fictionalized as Kurt Krone) was portrayed by the actor Vadim Glowna.
- In the film In the Shadow of Power (2003), Herold was portrayed by actor Martin Lüttge.
- In the film The Baader Meinhof Complex (2008, directed by Uli Edel based on a book by Stefan Aust), Herold was portrayed by actor Bruno Ganz.
