= Socialist Patients' Collective =

German pro-illness group (1968–71; 1973–present)

- Founder: Wolfgang Huber (born 1935)
- Dates active: 1968 – June 1971, 1973–present
- Active regions: Heidelberg University, West Germany, Europe, America
- Ideology: New Left; Marxism; Anti-Euthanasia; 'Pro-illness'; 'Illness vs. Capitalism'
- Status: Self-dissolved in 1971; continued as Patientenfront from 1973, currently SPK/PF(H)

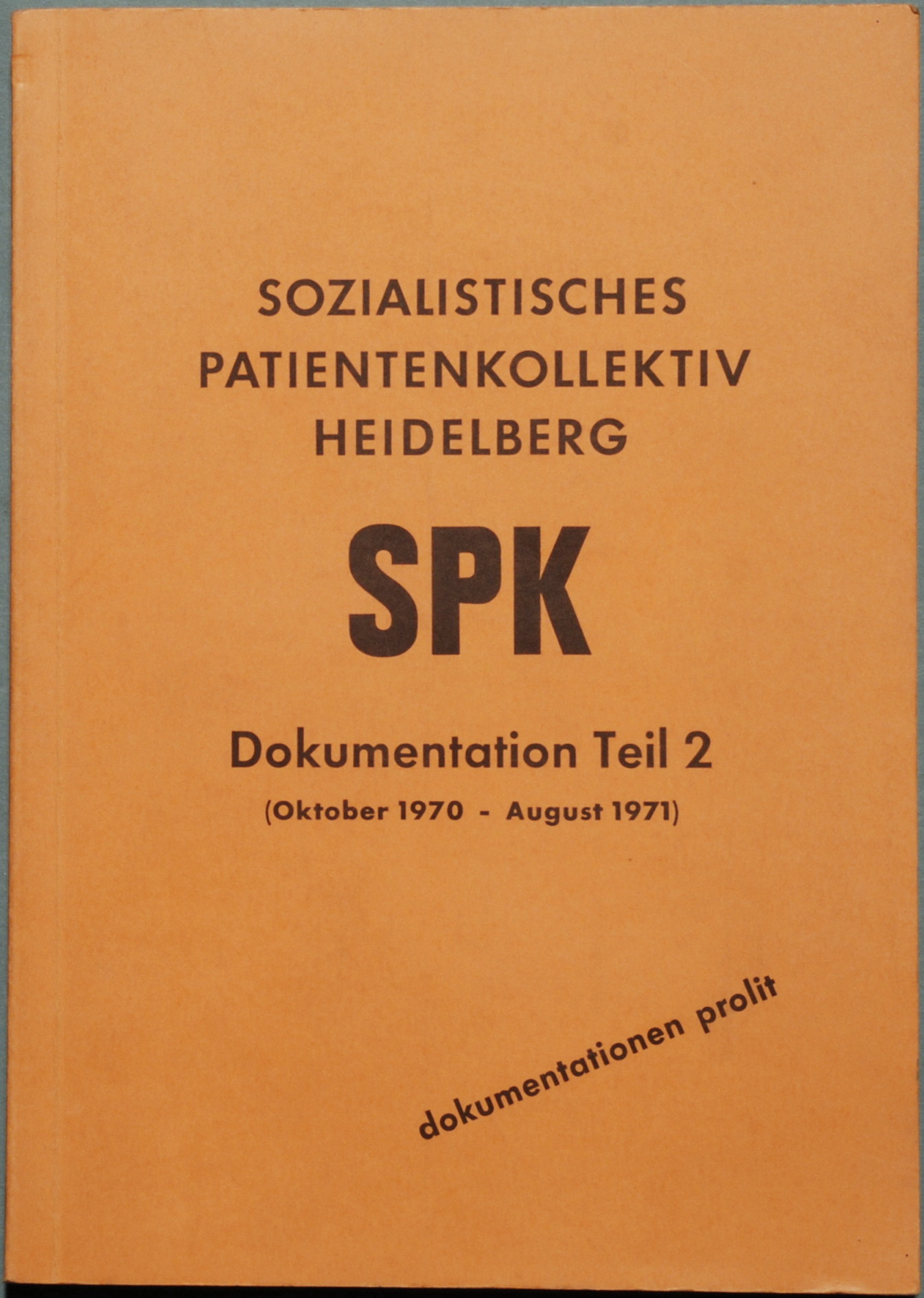
Sozialistisches Patienten-Kollektiv 1972

The Socialist Patients' Collective (German: Sozialistisches Patientenkollektiv, and known as the SPK) is a patients' collective founded in Heidelberg, West Germany, in February 1970 by Wolfgang Huber. The kernel of the SPK's ideological program is summed up in the slogan, "Turn illness into a weapon", which is representative of an ethos that is continually and actively practiced under the new title, Patients' Front/Socialist Patients' Collective, PF/SPK(H). The first collective, SPK, declared its self-dissolution in July 1971 as a strategic withdrawal but in 1973 Huber proclaimed the continuity of SPK as Patients' Front.

The SPK assumes that illness exists as an undeniable fact and believe that it is caused by the capitalist system. The SPK promotes illness as the protest against capitalism and considers illness as the foundation on which to create the human species. The SPK is opposed to doctors, considering them to be the ruling class of capitalism and responsible for poisoning the human species. The most widely recognized text of the PF/SPK(H) is the communique, SPK – Turn illness into a weapon, which has prefaces by both the founder of the SPK, Wolfgang Huber, and Jean-Paul Sartre.

Rejecting the roles and ideology associated with the notion of the revolutionary as scientific explainer, they stated in Turn Illness into a Weapon that whoever claims they want to "observe the bare facts dispassionately" is either an "idiot" or a "dangerous criminal."

== History ==
The group was founded by Wolfgang Huber and became publicly known in 1970 at the psychiatric hospital of the University of Heidelberg.

The SPK established a "free space" for "political therapy", re-framing illness as a contradiction created by capitalism which could be embraced to bring an end to the system which gave it life. They believed that the sick formed a revolutionary class of dispossessed people who could be radicalized to struggle against oppression. Organizing by sickness instead of socio-economic class allowed middle-class student leftists to articulate their own feelings of psychic and political oppression and to struggle against the status quo in their own right in solidarity with other oppressed groups. Additionally, according to the SPK sickness had the advantage of being familiar to everyone, hence everyone was a potential revolutionary so long as they disavowed the medical establishment. Like other anti-psychiatry experiments, such as Kingsley Hall and Villa 21, SPK questioned the patient/doctor paradigm and ultimately called for an overthrow of the "doctor's class".

The SPK collective produced information leaflets, held teach-ins and Heidelberg University studied to recognize SPK as a part of the university. SPK conducted "agitations", called "single" (individual actions) and "group agitations" (collective actions), working from 9 am to 10 pm or later.

However, the SPK experiment was criticized by many within Heidelberg's university and psychiatric clinic and the SPK's funding, salaries and meeting space were threatened. Despite opposition to the SPK, in the autumn of 1970 the university convened an advisory panel of 3 experts who recommended that the SPK should be institutionalized in Heidelberg university. To counter this suggestion, Heidelberg university's faculty of medicine supported the establishment of a counter-panel consisting of three critics of the SPK who were mandated to campaign against the group. The Minister overseeing both panels ultimately sided with the 3 SPK critics and decided against implementing any of the recommendations from the pro-SPK panel. SPK's funding was subsequently cut and the group was evicted from the university campus.

The decision provoked a confrontation between the SPK and the university, which led to a sit-in and attracted the attention of a wider audience, including the police. Ultimately, the collective moved out of the university and into the homes of its members. On 24 June 1971, a mysterious shooting at Heidelberg police station was attributed to the Baader-Meinhof group, and based on that unrelated pretext, the police began conducting raids on SPK members' houses. Three hundred fifty officers were charged with finding the shooter. At its peak, the SPK counted about 500 members; of these, seven were arrested in the raids, including Huber on 21 July 1971. Firstly SPK was falsely linked to the Baader-Meinhof group but none of the SPK patients arrested was ever condemned due to any relation with the Baader-Meinhof group and neither was ever proved any relation within SPK and RAF. Accounts notice the brutality, legal irregularities and other sort of abuses which surrounded the case, and they also notice this was part of a disinformation campaign against SPK due to their revolutionary positions, and thus SPK was criminalized as part of a political persecution.

The rhetoric denouncing the SPK as engaged in "terrorist activity" and a precursor to the RAF re-emerged after the arrest of Kristina Berster, who crossed the US border illegally seeking asylum from West German counterterrorism operations. Berster was acquitted of all conspiracy charges, and the disinformation campaign was exposed by Greg Guma.

A West German embassy spokesman stated, "By all accounts the SPC was fairly harmless." Kristina Berster explained that "the purpose of the Socialist Patients Collective was to find out the reasons why people feel lonely, isolated and depressed and the circumstances which caused these problems."

== Dissolution and the IZRU ==
Even before Huber was arrested in June 1971, the SPK dissolved. The IZRU or Information Zentrum Rote Volks-Universität (in English; Information Center of the Red People's University) was founded by former SPK members; however, the IZRU was neither the official or unofficial SPK. It organized international congresses, founded a newspaper: RVU (or Rote Volksuniversität, People's Red University), supported prisoners and reprinted some SPK literature.

== The SPK today ==
Since 1973, the SPK has continued as Patients' Front/Socialist Patients' Collective, or PF/SPK(H). The refounding of the collective as Patient's Front was announced by Huber whilst he was in solitary confinement in Stammheim Prison, later called PF/SPK(H).

== Interest and influence ==
Discussion of the SPK in both German-language and English-language written sources increased during the 1970s, fell during the 1980s, and rose again during the 1990s.

Artistic projects that have cited the group include SPK, an industrial music and noise music group in Australia, founded in 1978 and dissolved in 1988, which was named after the collective.

== See also ==
- Occupational burnout
- Capitalist Realism: Is There No Alternative?
- West German Embassy siege in Stockholm
