= Holger Meins =

German revolutionary, RAF member (1941–1974)

- Born: Holger Klaus Meins; 26 October 1941; Hamburg, Germany
- Died: 9 November 1974 (aged 33); Wittlich Prison, Wittlich, West Germany
- Cause of death: Starvation
- Organization: Red Army Faction

Holger Klaus Meins (26 October 1941 – 9 November 1974) was a German cinematography student who joined the Red Army Faction (RAF) in the early 1970s and died on hunger strike in prison.

== As a revolutionary ==
Meins became an important member of the RAF and was seen as a leading figure. He was very involved in the group's clandestine work, for instance hiring a metal sculptor to design a grenade casing and bomb mould designed to be placed under a woman's dress, giving the impression that she was pregnant, telling the sculptor that it was a prop for a film project.

On 1 June 1972, Meins and Andreas Baader, along with Jan-Carl Raspe, went to check on a storage garage in Frankfurt where they were storing explosives. The police had been surveilling the garage after a tip from a local resident. Meins and Baader entered the garage and were immediately surrounded. The police blocked the exit of the garage and fired tear gas grenades into the garage via a back window. Baader threw the tear gas back out. The stand-off did not last long after Baader was severely wounded when shot in the hip; Meins surrendered soon after. All three men were arrested.

In prison, Meins and the other RAF prisoners launched several hunger strikes to protest the conditions of their imprisonment.

As the hunger strike entered its seventh week, 32 activists from "anti-torture committees" from across the country occupied the Amnesty International headquarters in Hamburg to protest against prison conditions. The police cleared the office but did not take any personal details. Much later it became clear that around half of the activists later joined the RAF. This included Wolfgang Grams, who was later shot by GSG 9.

Meins died by starvation on hunger strike, on 9 November 1974. Although Meins was 1.83 meters (6'0") tall, he weighed only 39 kg (86 lbs) at the time of his death.

== Aftermath ==
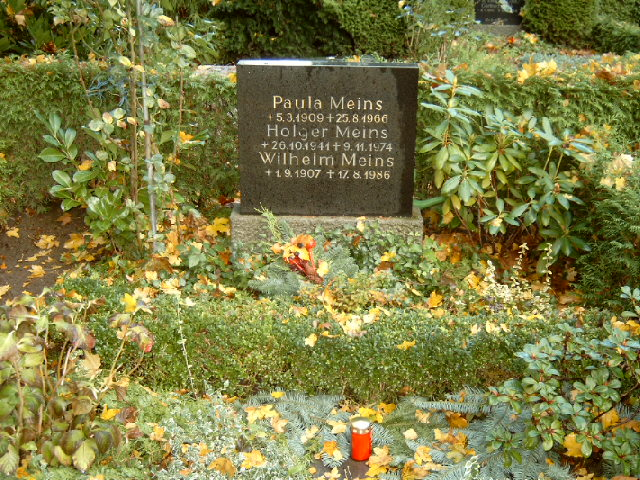
Burial site for Holger Meins.

Meins's death sparked many protest actions across Europe, with many turning violent. RAF members grew more opposed to the German state.

Hans-Joachim Klein, who acted as chauffeur for Jean-Paul Sartre in a meeting with Andreas Baader and became a militant, claimed that Meins's death showed him "the impotence of legality", and said that he carried a copy of Meins's autopsy photo as a reminder.

After the death of Holger Meins, around 5,000 people marched through the city in West Berlin despite a ban on demonstrations; there was a violent street battle with the police.

At Mein's funeral in Hamburg, Rudi Dutschke, among others. Dutschke promised at the open grave "Holger, the fight continues!"

The RAF members who carried out the West German Embassy siege in Stockholm in 1975 named their group the "Holger Meins Commando" in his honor.

== Representation in other media ==
- Jean-Marie Straub's and Danièle Huillet's movie, Moses und Aron (1974), is dedicated to Meins. He had earlier been the directors' friend, working as a cameraman.
- Starbuck-Holger Meins (2002) is a documentary film about him by Gerd Conradt.

== See also ==
- Members of the Red Army Faction
