= Jürgen Ponto =

German banker and lawyer

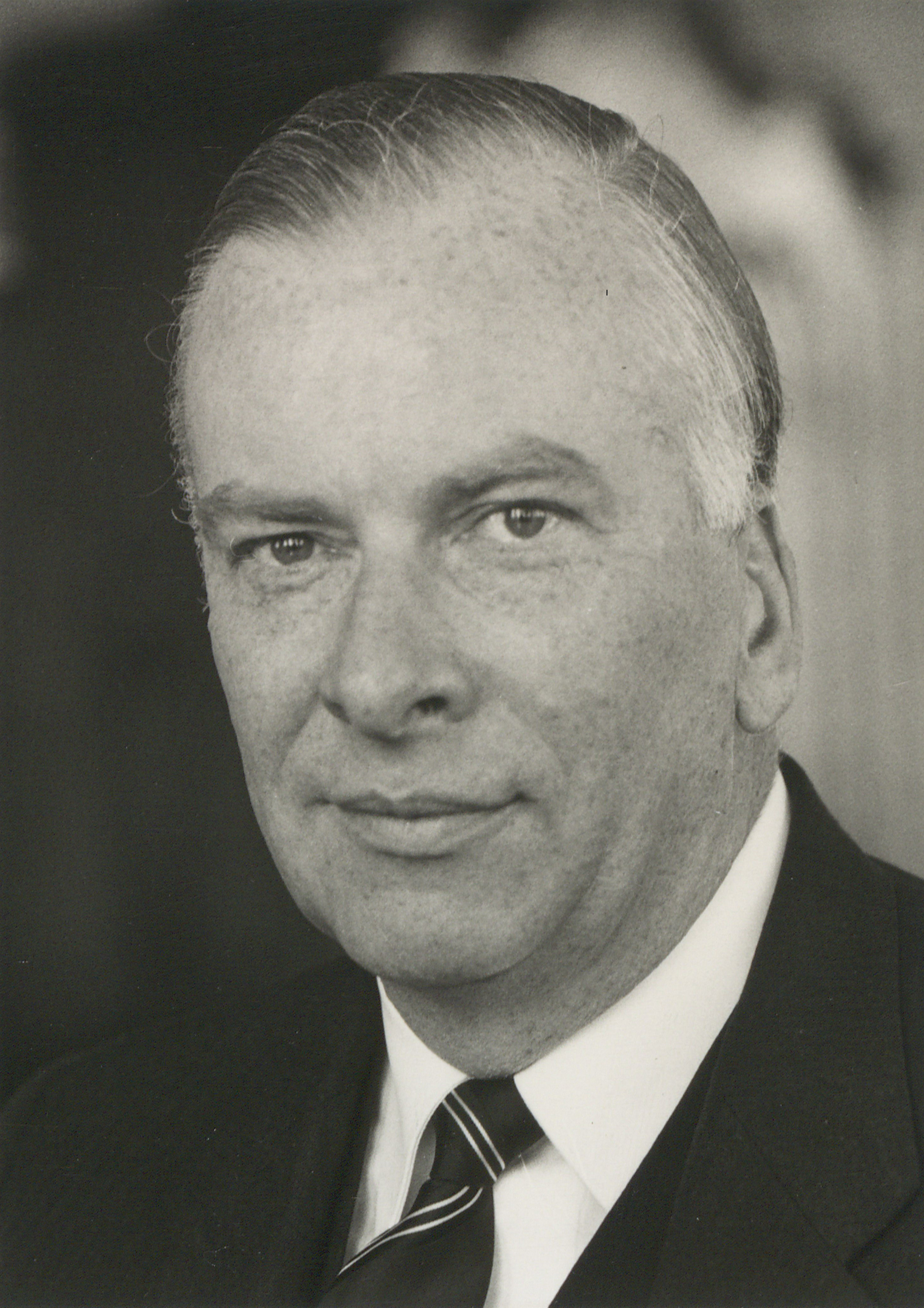
- Born: 17 December 1923; Bad Nauheim, Hesse, Germany
- Died: 30 July 1977 (aged 53); Frankfurt am Main, Hesse, Germany
- Cause of death: Assassination (gunshot wounds)
- Occupation: Bank manager
- Years active: 1950-1977
- Relatives: Erich Ponto (uncle)

Jürgen Ponto (17 December 1923 – 30 July 1977) was a German banker and, from 1969, chairman of the Dresdner Bank board of directors. Previously, he had worked as a lawyer. He was murdered by members of the Red Army Faction in events leading up to the German Autumn.

== Early life ==
Ponto was born in Bad Nauheim. Through his father Robert, he was the nephew of actor Erich Ponto. Shortly after his birth, Ponto moved to Ecuador, where his father was working for a trading business, returning to Germany when he was three years old. Ponto finished his Abitur at Wilhelm-Gymnasium in Hamburg, after which he was drafted into the Wehrmacht. He served until 1943, when he was discharged after sustaining a head wound from grenade shrapnel while on the Eastern Front, and enrolled at the University of Göttingen in 1944 to study legal and political science. After the end of World War II, Ponto studied law at the University of Hamburg.

== Career ==
In 1950, Ponto took a job at Hamburger Kreditbank, part of Dresdner Bank. He became general counsel of the bank in 1959, joining the board of directors as a substitute member in 1964. Ponto was made a full-fledged board member in 1967, becoming the board's chairman in 1969. He was responsible for advancing the company into the international market, and as a personal adviser, Ponto was able to influence the financial decisions of the German government under Helmut Schmidt. He is also credited with convincing Kuwait's ruling family, the House of Sabah, to become a major shareholder of Daimler-Benz in 1974.

== Death ==
On Saturday, 30 July 1977, Ponto and his wife Ignes were at their Oberursel villa packing for a vacation in Ecuador, but were also expecting a visit from Susanne Albrecht, the daughter of a good friend of the Pontos. They did not know that Albrecht belonged to the RAF and had gone underground some weeks before. She arrived at around 17:10 with two strangers, later identified as Brigitte Mohnhaupt and Christian Klar. Albrecht gave Ignes a bouquet of red roses, and all the guests were invited into the living room, where Ignes left them alone with Ponto.

From the living room, raised voices were heard and then gunshots. It is thought that Albrecht and her accomplices attempted to kidnap Ponto, and after he resisted, they shot him. He was shot five times and later died in a hospital in Frankfurt of his wounds. The three killers fled the villa with their getaway driver Peter-Jürgen Boock. The killers took responsibility for the murder in the name of Roter Morgen (Red Morning).

== See also ==
- German Autumn
- Red Army Faction
