= Peter-Jürgen Boock =

German terrorist

- Born: 3 September 1951 (age 74); Garding, West Germany
- Organization: Red Army Faction

Peter-Jürgen Boock (born 3 September 1951) is a German former terrorist of the Red Army Faction.

== Early life ==
Boock grew up in North Frisia. His father was a career soldier, and ran a restaurant after the war. Both of his parents moved to Hamburg to work with the postal service, and as a result, Boock was raised by his grandmother for several years. His brother was born in 1958 while he was living with his grandmother. After completing secondary school, Boock began training as a mechanic but soon quit. He claimed that his father was a staunch Nazi. Boock said that he asked his father over and over again about what he "did or didn't do" as a Nazi, and he always refused to talk about it. This caused Boock to become extremely upset and assumed the worst about his father. He then left his parents' home and travelled to the Netherlands. He became involved with illegal drugs, and was arrested for possession. Soon after this he attempted suicide. Boock spent the next few years in rehabilitation programs and living in re-education homes. He was admitted to the Glückstadt State Welfare Home when he was 18, where he and other people staged a riot. They were punished with several weeks of detention, and Boock and several other of the rioters tried to commit suicide because of the stress from detention. He was transferred to the Beiserhaus in Ronshausen, and this is where he came in contact with Gudrun Ensslin and Andreas Baader. After talking to Ensslin and Baader, Boock and 50 other people broke out of the facility. He wanted to join the Red Army Faction but was deemed too young. Boock moved into Ensslin and Baader's apartment in February of 1970 in Hamburg, and during this time he entered and left the drug scene several times. At one point when he was trying to get clean, he offered his services as an informant to the narcotics division of the Hamburg police. He moved to Frankfurt am Main and continued abusing drugs. In 1973, he married Waltraud Liewald (who would also later become an RAF terrorist).

== Terrorism ==
At some point between 1975 and 1976, Boock joined the RAF and went underground. He travelled to Southern Yemen, where he received terrorist training (including hostage taking and hijacking). He became an involved member of the second generation Red Army Faction.

- In July 1977 he was the getaway driver in the plot to kidnap Jürgen Ponto. The plot fell through however, and Ponto was murdered.
- In August 1977, Boock constructed a rocket launcher, a mini-Stalin Organ, which was capable of firing primitive missiles. He trained the weapon on the offices of the Federal Prosecutor. The launcher didn't work, and Boock claimed that he had a change of heart at the last minute and deliberately sabotaged the weapon himself.
- In September 1977, Boock was involved in the kidnap-murder of Hanns-Martin Schleyer, and was one of the RAF kidnappers who opened fire on Schleyer's car.
- In 1978 he was arrested in Yugoslavia, with Brigitte Mohnhaupt, Sieglinde Hofmann and Rolf Clemens Wagner. They were later freed and flown to a country of their choice because West Germany turned down an offer from Yugoslavia to extradite them in exchange for eight Croatian political fugitives in West Germany.

Later in life, Boock would claim in an interview for the 2002 documentary series The Age of Terror: A Survey of Modern Terrorism, that he and his RAF associates were more like their Nazi fathers than they thought, saying:

One thing we found out about ourselves is that we were indeed the sons of our fathers. We very quickly reached the same point where we said all possible actions are ok. If you reach your target, all losses are ok if you reach your target. And it was quite the same thing our fathers said.

== Arrest and imprisonment ==
Boock distanced himself from the RAF in 1980. However in 1981 he was arrested in Hamburg. He played down his role within the RAF, though was sentenced to life imprisonment terms for his involvement in the Ponto and Schleyer murders. In 1992 he admitted his full involvement in certain RAF activities, such as the Schleyer murder.

He was freed from prison on 13 March 1998 and now works as a freelance writer near Freiburg.

In 2007, he accused Stefan Wisniewski of the murder of Siegfried Buback.
