= Münsterland murders =

Unsolved German serial murders

Münsterland Killer
- Other name: "The Hitchhikers' Killer"

Details
- Victims: 4+
- Span of crimes: 1971–1974
- Country: West Germany
- States: North Rhine-Westphalia, Lower Saxony
- Date apprehended: N/A

The Münsterland murders (German: Münsterlandmorde) is the nickname given to a series of unsolved murders committed in the Münster and Bentheim areas of West Germany from 1971 to 1974.

The four known victims were all young, petite, dark-haired women in their 20s who had hitchhiked prior to their disappearances. They were later found strangled, without signs of sexual abuse, with their corpses posed in unnatural positions. Their possessions had been stolen, with only one item ever found in a location far away from the murder scene, partly burned. The killings are unsolved, and the suspected perpetrator, nicknamed 'The Münsterland Killer' (Münsterlandmörder) or 'The Hitchhikers' Killer' (Anhalterinnenmörder) by the media, has never been caught.

== Murders ==
The victims came from different social classes and were not known to have any connection with each other. All are believed to have been strangled immediately after their kidnappings, but not at the location where they were abducted.

=== Edeltraud van Boxel ===
The first victim was 23-year-old Edeltraud van Boxel, a street prostitute on the Industriestraße in Münster, near the former WGC petrol station. She was described as very short (1.47m), with dark hair and seven months pregnant. On the evening of her disappearance, she was dressed in a light-coloured coat and knee socks, and carried a black handbag and a red umbrella.

According to her colleagues, she got into a white Volkswagen Beetle with a "large rear window" on Sunday, 21 November 1971, at around 8:30 PM, later stating that the car's registration number had the letter "F" and the number "8" in it. The car was parked a little out of the way and suddenly drove away at high speeds after 20 minutes, without bringing Boxel back. Her umbrella was left behind. About an hour later, at around 9:15 PM, witnesses travelling on the Bundesstraße 54 between Nienberge and Altenberge were overtaken by a Volkswagen Beetle driving at high speeds and, according to them, there was the lifeless form of a woman tilted against the window of the passenger seat.

At about 11:40 PM, her body was found on a dirt road by a farmer on his way home. Boxel was partially undressed and placed on her stomach, and burn marks were found on her ankles from the heater in Volkswagen Beetle models of the time, confirming that she was transported by her kidnapper. She had been strangled, but there was no indication that she had been sexually assaulted. A button which was torn off from her coat and her black handbag were missing and have never been found.

=== Barbara Storm ===
Described as a "fun-loving party girl who liked to hitchhike", the 20-year-old Storm, an ironer from Schüttorf, was 1.68m tall and had black hair, which she typically wore with Cleopatra-style bangs (fringe). On the day of her disappearance, she wore a red crinkled patent leather coat, a green pantsuit (trouser suit), a burgundy handbag with a long imitation leather strap, yellow ankle socks and light brown suede shoes.

Storm met the perpetrator after an extended disco tour, which also included the then popular “Tenne” discotheque in Rheine. She left her house in Schüttorf on Saturday, 13 May 1972, around 7:30 PM, and initially travelled by hitchhiking to Rheine, where she was soon seen at the disco. Storm left with a visitor, with whom she presumably spent the night, but was seen again at the disco the following evening. However, she failed to appear at work on Monday 15 May, and upon questioning witnesses, it was learned that she had been accompanied to Schüttorf by a 20-to-30-year-old man about 1.75 to 1.80m tall, slim and supposedly with facial or acne scars, but were unsure whether that was on that Monday or Tuesday. What was verifiable is that her bank received a call from a woman who claimed to be Barbara Storm, who wanted to know if her salary had been paid into her account. Nothing could be given to her, as she did not give her account number and the clerk responsible had already gone home. The following Monday evening, she was seen at the "Tenne" again, and this time, witnesses claimed she started a conversation with a young man about 1.80 to 1.90m in height and who had short, dark-blonde hair. The pair left the disco at around 10:30 PM, after which Storm's trail vanished.

On Wednesday, 17 May 1972, Storm's body was found in a field on a then unpaved junction in the woods near Schöppingen: she was lying on her back, in a cross-shaped position, and her genitalia were exposed. She had been strangled and had apparently fought her attacker, as she had lacerations and bruises; like the previous victim, nothing indicated that she had been raped. The lane near where she was found connected Schöppingen and Gronau, but there was also a relatively direct road connection via Neuenkirchen, Wettringen and Metelen to Schöppingen (today part of Bundesstraße 70), so the exact crime scene remains unknown. According to the forester who found Storm's body, the place where she had been dumped was a known lovers' lane, but the employee said the body was not there on Tuesday because there had been a buck hunt that day which he had attended. The police concluded that she must have been brought there in a vehicle. Like Boxel, personal items such as her left shoe, jacket, handbag and a white/red cosmetics bag were missing, and have never been found.

=== Marlies Hemmers ===
An 18-year-old schoolgirl from Nordhorn, Hemmers, like the previous victims, was described as petite, short and with dark hair. On 6 August 1973, she wanted to hitchhike from Nordhorn to the Kunsthalle in Düsseldorf, accompanied by her friend Peter, who was planning a trip to Vienna, Austria. They started very early in the morning and arrived at the Franzosenschlucht near Bad Bentheim at 7 AM, but after realizing that they had less of a chance of being picked up due to excessive luggage, the pair decided to hitchhike separately. Her friend was taken first, but only as far as the exit from Ochtrup on the B54. When he started hitchhiking again, at about 7:45 AM, he saw a foreign car with a black license plate drive past him. Inside, he saw Hemmers, who did not respond to his calls or wave. Peter later told police that the driver, whom he described as "older" and whose car's back seat was crammed with various items, accelerated after he saw him. After arriving at the Kunsthalle in Düsseldorf, Peter waited for six hours, and after Hemmers failed to arrive, he filed a missing persons report.

Hemmers was found almost six months later, on 22 December, in a small wood called Merfelder Bruch, opposite a horse breeding ground. By that time, her body had completely skeletonized, so it was impossible to determine whether she was sexually assaulted or what the cause of death was but the date of death was assumed to have been the day of the abduction. Unlike the other victims, the perpetrator had apparently made some effort to conceal the corpse because he must have carried both the body and the heavy luggage into the area, which was inaccessible by car from the main road. Hemmers' luggage was found not far from her body, but her handbag and hostel ID were missing and have never been found.

=== Erika Kunze ===
Kunze, a 22-year-old student at the University of Münster, had planned to hitchhike to her mother's home after successfully passing her exam. A petite woman with shoulder-length dark hair, she was described as polite but wary of vehicles with non-local license plates. When she did not arrive at her mother's house at the appointed time, her mother called the police. In the evening, a driver passing near the Samerott, an impassable piece of forest near Schüttorf, which encloses the former Germanic place of execution Rabenbaum, near Burgsteinfurt recounted a strange experience he had: he later told the police that he drove behind a dark-grey limousine with "rear fins" (possibly a Mercedes) with a "BF" license plate, the driver of which was apparently looking for an entrance towards the forest. By his side, what appeared to be the lifeless body of a woman was slumped in the passenger seat.

Less than a week later, Kunze's body was found by a farmer. The body was in an advanced state of decomposition, and the authorities were unable to determine the cause of death, it was clear, however, that this was the work of the same perpetrator who operated in the area. Like all previous victims, Kunze had been strangled and left half-naked, with several belongings missing, including a bag with floral patterns containing library books. These were found by chance many weeks later, together with a man's jacket, half-burned near the Haddorf Lakes.

== Perpetrator ==
The supposed perpetrator was described as "relatively tall" (1.80m - 1.90m), with medium to dark blonde, short hair, with an "inconspicuous" haircut which parted in the middle. His age ranged from early 20s to "older". After the second murder, the police made a facial composite based on witness descriptions. It is also supposed that he had access to different cars of both German and non-German origin, and was likely very familiar with the local area.

=== Possible vehicles ===
According to witness reports the killer used at least three different vehicles. Two vehicles had white German license plates, while the third had black plates of unknown origin.

1. In the Boxel case, he drove a bright Volkswagen Beetle with a "large rear window" and a German license plate with an "F" and an "8"
2. In the Hemmers case, he drove what was described as a dark or dark green foreign car with a black license plate. According to the hosts of Aktenzeichen XY… ungelöst, the car might have been a Citroën DS with a French license plate.
3. In the Kunze case, he drove a "grey limousine with fintails" (possibly a Mercedes) with a German license plate bearing the letters "BF".

Of the four known murder victims, only the car used in the Storm murder is unknown.

== Investigation ==
Due to the locations of origin, kidnappings and crime scenes being scattered across North Rhine-Westphalia and Lower Saxony (three of the victims being from the Bentheim area, with the exception of Boxel, the only one from Münster), the investigation fell mostly to the Münster Police Station and Public Prosecutor's Office, as well as their colleagues in Nordhorn and Osnabrück. Det. Inspector Wills was placed in charge of Münster, while Det. Inspector Alois Krone and Chief Det. Inspector Johann Goldenstein were appointed for Nordhorn.

After Boxel's murder in 1971, a manhunt was initiated for the killer based on the descriptions given by fellow prostitutes, but it was unsuccessful. At that time, only two districts in the vicinity used an "F" in their license plate numbers (Steinfurt and Warendorf), but despite a large-scale operation checking all license plates available, they were unable to capture the perpetrator.

Following Storm's murder, a facial composite was created based on the additional descriptions of the witnesses, with a 5,000 Deutsche Mark reward offered for any potential tips. Wanted posters were also put up but to no avail. Police also inspected the 308 registered Mercedes cars in the area, but unlike the previous search, the owners never visited personally and only wrote letters to the investigators.

In the 1990s, DNA was found under Storm's fingernails, but so far, it has not been matched to a suspect. In 2015, the cold case was reopened and is under active investigation. The grave of a now-deceased suspect was also opened, but unfortunately, the match came back negative, thus eliminating him from the inquiry. The case is being actively investigated by a cold case unit.

== Possible connection to other murders ==
Since the Münsterland murders seemed to abruptly stop, it has been suspected that the killer might have continued killing elsewhere. It has been suggested that the killer might be responsible for the following crimes:

- The 'Heidelberg murders' - an unexplained series of murders that occurred in Heidelberg in 1975. Like the Münsterland Killer, the Heidelberg murderer's victims were all young women who often hitchhiked; however, all of his known victims were blond and had visible traces of sexual assault. It was speculated that he might have been a student at the University of Münster who later moved to Heidelberg, or possibly a soldier who had later been transferred out of the area.
- The 'Rhine-Neckar murders' - a year after the Heidelberg killings, the bodies of young hitchhikers began to appear in the Rhine and Neckar rivers, all of which remain unsolved to this day. The main difference to this theory is none of the Münsterland Killer's victims were thrown into bodies of water.
- 1977 to 1979, another similar killing spree started in Cuxhaven, and was initially named "The Disco Murders". It later continued into Bremen in the 1980s, and was later given the collective name "The Death Triangle of Bremen". Unlike the aforementioned killings, however, two of the murders included in this category have been solved and were determined to be the doing of different, unrelated (serial)killers, like Egidius Schiffer.
- The Göhrde murders - finally, an attempt was made to link the perpetrator of the Göhrde murders, Kurt-Werner Wichmann, but to no avail.

In the 1970s, the Münsterland murders provoked a great deal of press hype and were repeatedly showcased on the television programme Aktenzeichen XY... ungelöst, which ran several broadcasts on the case from 11 April to 9 May 1975.

Since 2020, German director Detlef Muckel has also announced that he is working on a documentary revolving around the case, titled Akte Münsterlandmörder.

== See also ==
- List of German serial killers
- List of solved missing person cases
