= Jörg Ziercke =

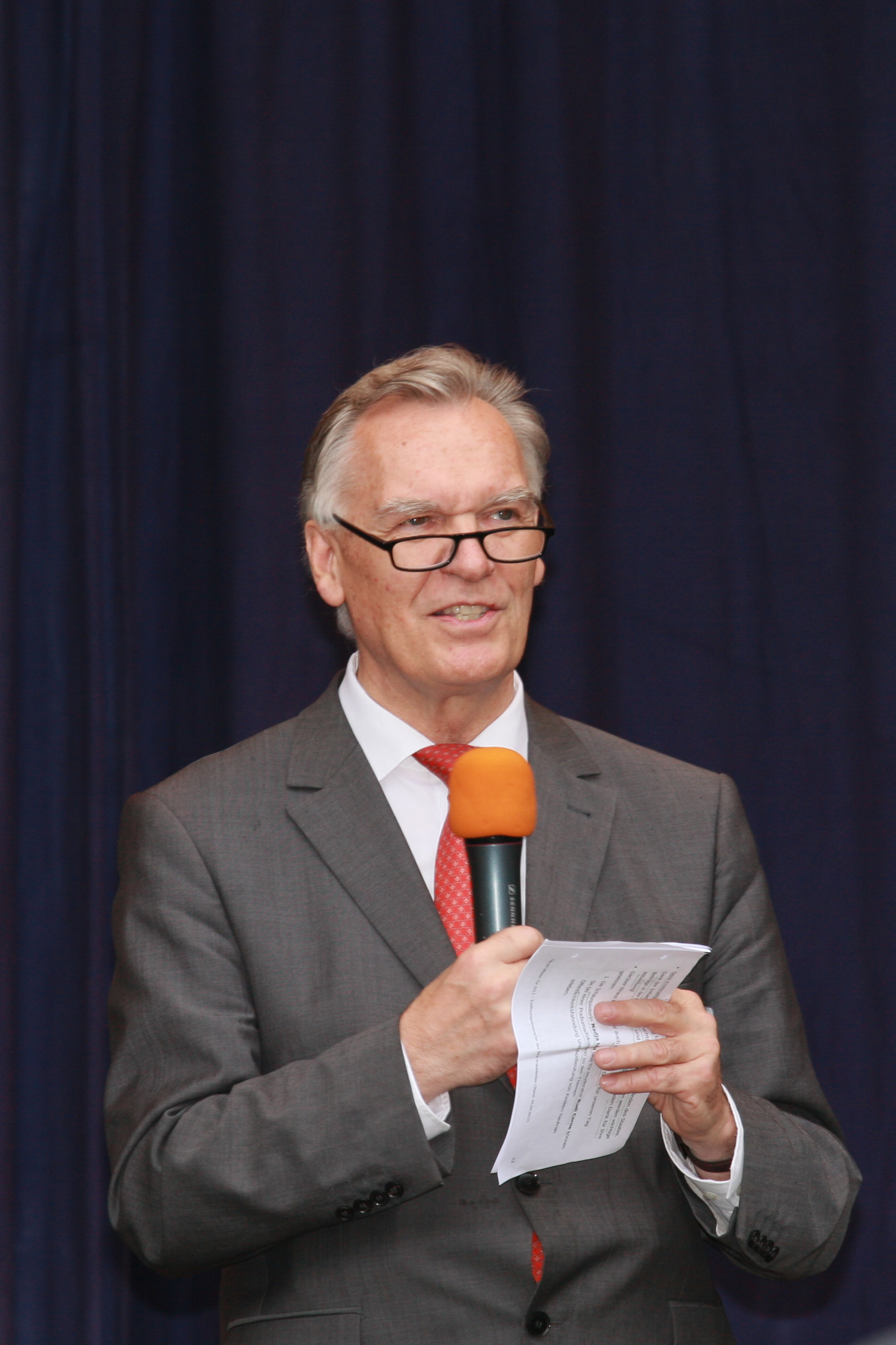
- Ziercke speaking in 2013

Chief commissioner of the Federal Criminal Police Office of Germany
- In office 26 February 2004 – 30 November 2014
- Preceded by: Klaus Ulrich Kersten
- Succeeded by: Holger Münch

Personal details
- Born: 18 July 1947 (age 79) Lübeck, Germany
- Profession: Police Officer

Jörg Ziercke (born 18 July 1947) served as the chief commissioner of the Federal Criminal Police Office of Germany (Bundeskriminalamt) from 2004 to 2014.

== Career ==
After graduating from the Oberschule zum Dom in Lübeck, Jörg Ziercke entered the police service with the Bereitschaftspolizei in 1967 as a police candidate for the riot police force. He completed training for the senior service of the criminal police from 1968 to 1970.

From 1970 to 1975, Ziercke worked as a criminal investigator with the state investigations bureau (Landeskriminalamt) in Kiel, and also in the operational area of the police force and at the Schleswig-Holstein State Criminal Police Office.

After his training for the senior police service at the then Police Command Academy (now the German Police University) in Münster, he became the chief of the Neumünster investigations department (Kriminalpolizei) in 1979. In the following years he also took on duties for the head of the Kiel Criminal Police Directorate and was seconded to the Itzehoe Criminal Police Directorate in 1981. In 1985 he moved to the Kiel Ministry of the Interior, where he was initially the personnel, training and further education officer for the Schleswig-Holstein State Police. From 1990 to 1992, Ziercke was head of the Schleswig-Holstein State Police School and supported the establishment of the Mechlenburg-Vorpommern State Police School (as part of reunification). In 1992 he moved to the police in the Schleswig-Holstein Ministry of the Interior and took over the management of the police department there in 1995. In February 2004, Otto Schily (SPD), Federal Minister of the Interior from 1998 to 2005, made Ziercke President of the Federal Criminal Police Office after Ulrich Kersten was dismissed early. In 2007, in his role as the President of the Federal Criminal Police Office, Ziercke initiated three specialist conferences on the Federal Criminal Police Office's Nazi past, which resulted in an extensive research project under the direction of historian Patrick Wagner. This was the first research project by a German security authority to examine its own Nazi past.

Ziercke retired at the end of November 2014. His successor was Holger Münch, who was previously State Councilor to the Senator for the Interior and Sport in Bremen.

Ziercke is a member of the SPD. Since 2001 he has been active on the board of the German Forum for Crime Prevention and has been deputy federal chairman of Weisser Ring since October 21, 2012. From 2018 to 2022 Ziercke was federal chairman of Weisser Ring.

== Criticisms ==
Online searches

At the beginning of 2007, Ziercke came under criticism for his support for controversial secret online searches. The German computer magazine, Chip, awarded him the negative award "Bremse des Jahres 2007" for this. Ziercke described the statements on this topic in the press as technically untenable; his specialists were not "hackers".

According to a report by Der Spiegel in July 2007, at an event for parliamentarians he showed content from so-called "shocker sites" (video clips of executions in the form of beheadings, brutal child abuse, BDSM) in order to promote the planned law on secret online searches to the invited MPs.

Internet blocking

Ziercke has been calling for years for the implementation of regulation on blocking websites initied by the then Federal Minister for Family Affairs, Ursula vor der Leyen. He repeatedly stressed that the Federal Criminal Police Office would not be able to effectively combat illegal content on the internet by deleting it alone. Under his leadership, the agency issued several statements underlining this position and emphatically calling for the introduction of network blocks. Ziercke explained that "in any case, 1,000, possibly up to 5,000 pages with child pornography content must be blocked. [...] This involves hundreds of thousands of accesses that are to be prevented every day and redirected to stop pages."

On April 5, 2011, the federal government (Merkel II Cabinet) decided to repeal the Access Restriction Act. The then Federal Minister of Justice, Sabine Leuthesser-Schnarrenberger, explained the reasons for the decision: "According to current figures from the Federal Criminal Police Office, 93 percent of child pornography content is deleted after two weeks, and after four weeks the figure is as high as 99 percent."

Drone attacks

In January 2011, a judge at the Karlsruhe Higher Regional Court filed a criminal complaint against Ziercke for aiding and abetting the murder of a German Islamist. The public prosecutor's office in Wiesbaden refused to initiate an investigation against Ziercke.

Edathy affair

In the Edathy affair, Ziercke was accused of misconduct in the office of President of the German Federal Criminal Police Office and his resignation was demanded.

On December 18, 2014, Sebastian Edathy (SPD) stated before the German Bundestag's investigative committee headed by Eva Högl (SPD) that Ziercke (SPD), in the office of President of the German Federal Criminal Police Office, was the source of information for his informant Michael Hartmann (SPD), who warned him of searches, among other things. Ziercke had a Federal Criminal Police Office spokesman say in the magazine Stern that he had not informed Hartmann directly.

Ziercke was summoned to appear before the investigative committee on January 15, 2015. Due to a lack of initial suspicion, the responsible public prosecutor's office in Wiesbaden, under the authority of Volkmar Kallenbach, has not yet taken any measures to prevent obstruction of justice in office.

== Awards ==
- 2009: Grand Silver Medal of Honour with the Star for Services to the Republic of Austria.
- 2012: Bul le Mérite for, among other things, his life's work as a criminal investigator.
- 2015: Outstanding Security Performance Award (OSPA) for his life's work.

== Personal life ==
Jörg Ziercke is married and has two children. He is a member of the SPD.
