= Dig Deeper =

Dig Deeper may refer to:

- Dig Deeper (album), by D.I.G., 1994
- Dig Deeper: The Disappearance of Birgit Meier, a 2021 German television miniseries

== See also ==
- Dig Deep (disambiguation)
