= Holger Münch =

German police officer (born 1961)

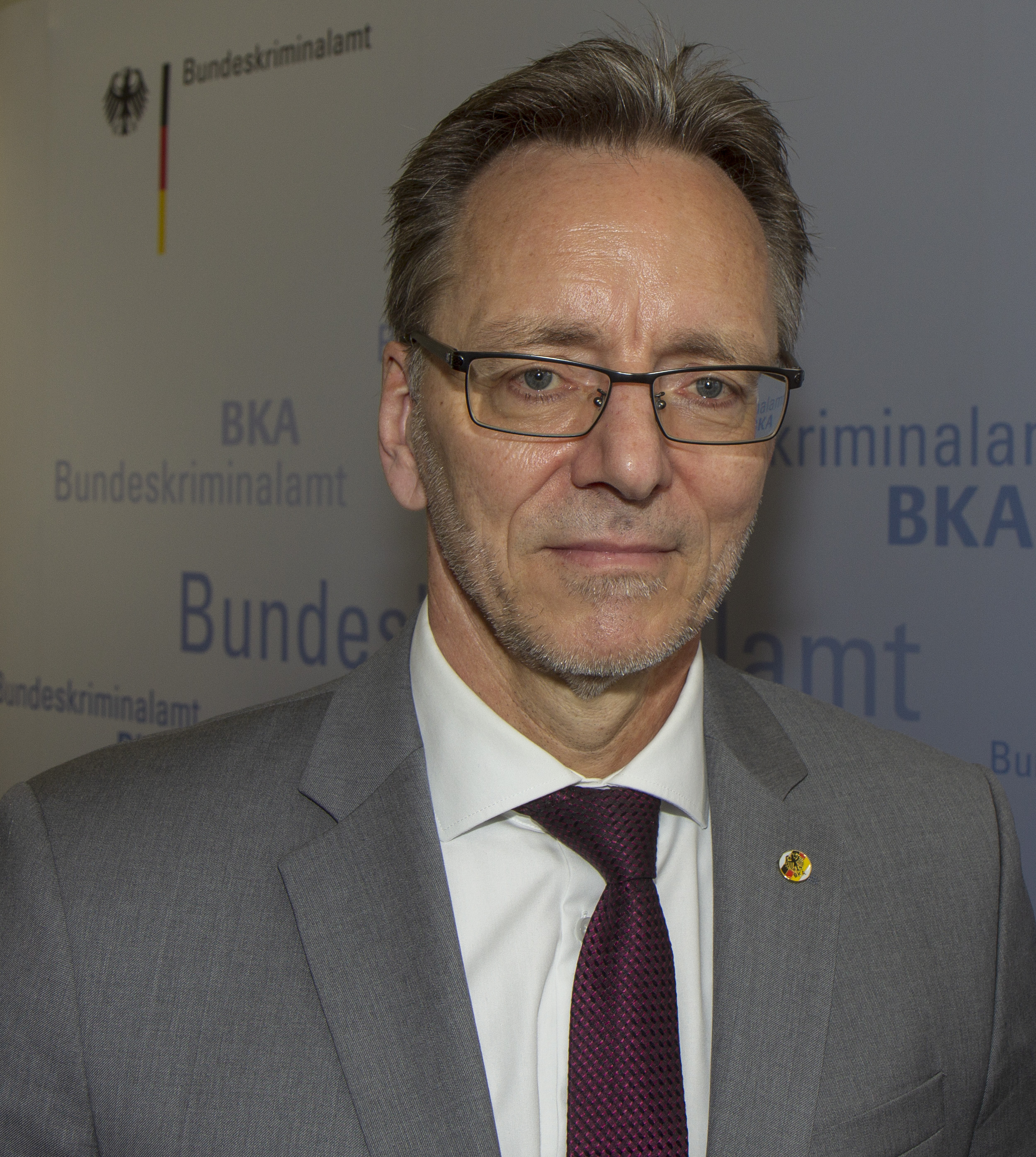
Münch in 2019

Holger Münch (born 17 August 1961) is a German police officer and since 2014 has been chief of the Federal Criminal Police Office (BKA).

== Life and career ==
Münch was born 1961 in Bremen and started in 1978 as a police officer in the force of his home town. From 2009 to 2011 he was chief of police in Bremen.

From 1987 to 1991 he served in the personal protection unit of BKA, comparable to US Secret Service deployments.

Up from 2005 he was director of state criminal police office in Bremen, LKA Bremen. In 2011 he became police president of Bremen.

Since December 2014 Münch has been serving as chief of the Bundeskriminalamt (Federal Criminal Police Office), a German federal law enforcement board which is roughly comparable to the FBI. His main objectives are organized crime with new concepts like „Crime-as-a-Service“-Modelle and strengthen of international cooperation.

During Münch's time in office, the BKA notably conducted a coordinated 2017 campaign across 14 states, raiding the homes of 36 people accused of hateful postings over social media, including threats, coercion and incitement to racism.

== Other activities ==
- Max Planck Institute for the Study of Crime, Security and Law, Member of the Board of Trustees
