= Göhrde murders =

1989 unsolved German murders

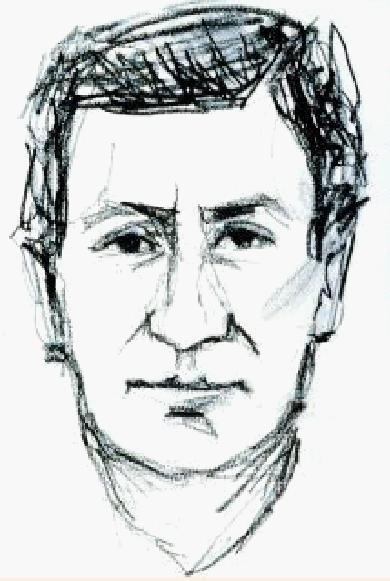
- Police sketch of the alleged perpetrator circa 1989
- Native name: Göhrde-Morde
- Date: 21 May – 12 July 1989
- Location: Göhrde State Forest; 53.12996805°N 10.9625953°E
- Perpetrator: Unknown
- Suspects: Kurt-Werner Wichmann, John Cooper
- Convictions: None

The Göhrde murders were two double murders which took place in the summer of 1989 near Göhrde in Lower Saxony, West Germany. Within the space of a few weeks, two couples were found dead in the Göhrde State Forest, deemed by police to have been victims of the same killer. Although the murders remain unresolved, police announced in December 2017 that Kurt-Werner Wichmann, a suspected serial killer who committed suicide in 1993, was their prime suspect. Investigators have also speculated that another unknown person may be linked to the killings. The murders were widely reported on in the German press, and the area where they took place was largely avoided by members of the public for nearly thirty years.

== Location and weather ==
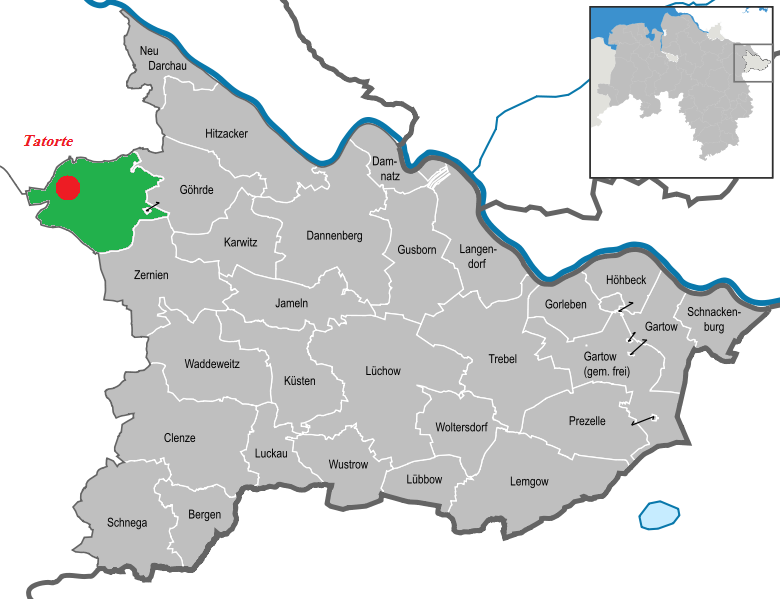
Location of the Göhrde State Forest and the crime scene in the Lüchow-Dannenberg district

=== The Göhrde and the crime scene ===
The Göhrde State Forest occupies about 75 square kilometres in the Lüchow-Dannenberg district, with a small section crossing over into the Lüneberg district. The two crime scenes were located near Bundesstraße 216, in the hunting sections 138 and 147.

The Göhrde is the largest mixed forest in northern Germany and mostly uninhabited. It used to be the hunting ground of the Dukes of Brunswick and Lüneberg and later, the Kings of Hanover and the German Emperor. At the time of the murders the forest stood close to West Germany's border with East Germany.

=== Weather and temperatures ===
There was an unusual heatwave in the summer of 1989 in Lower Saxony, and this meant the crime scenes were mostly undisturbed by weather conditions. On the other hand, the high temperatures greatly accelerated decomposition of the bodies.

== Murders ==
=== First double murder ===
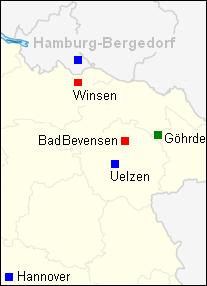
The crime scene is marked in green. The first victims came from Bergedorf, and their car was found in Winsen. The second couple came from Hanover or Uelzen; their vehicle was found in Bad Bevensen.

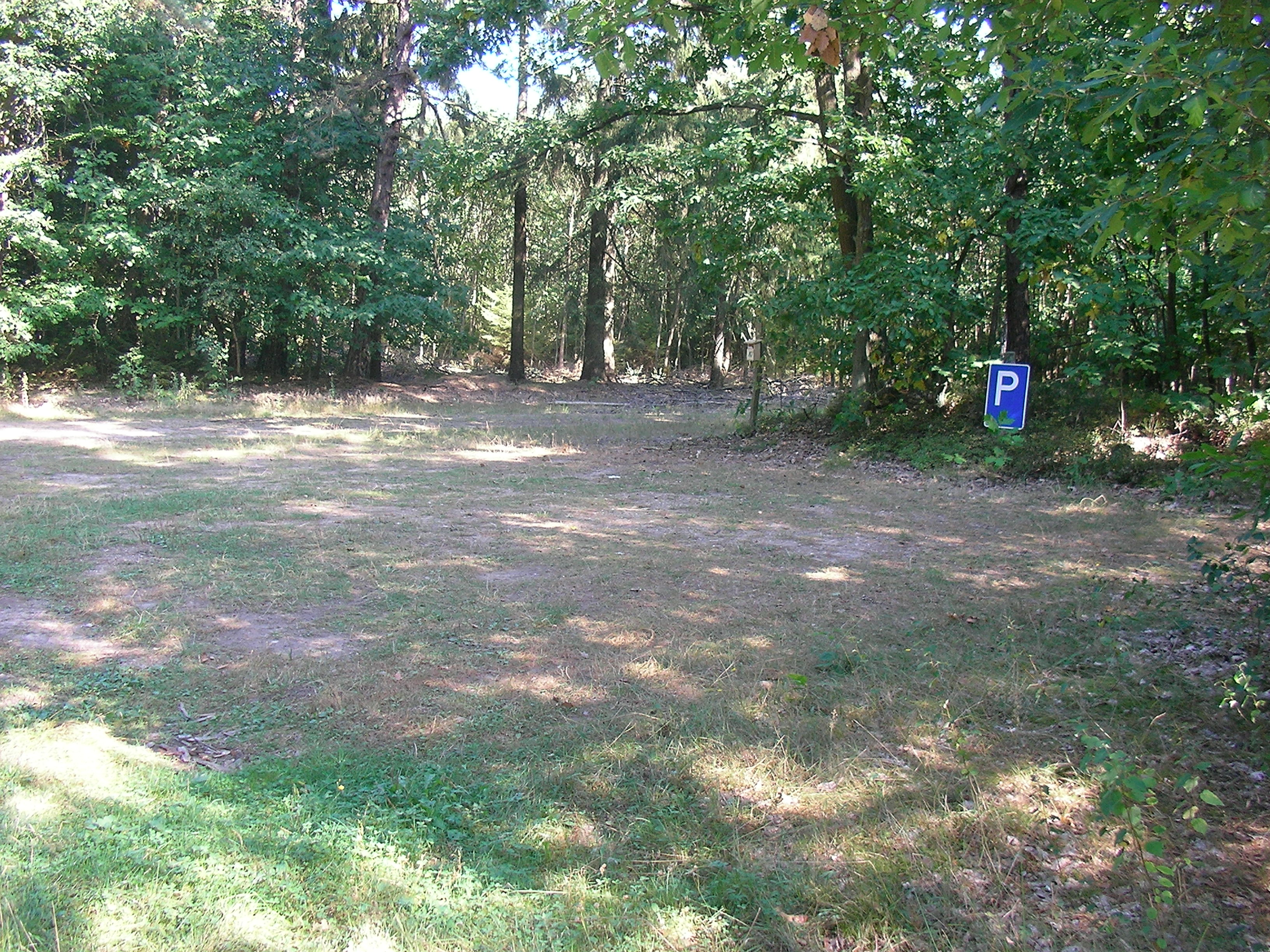
Parking near Forsthaus Röthen

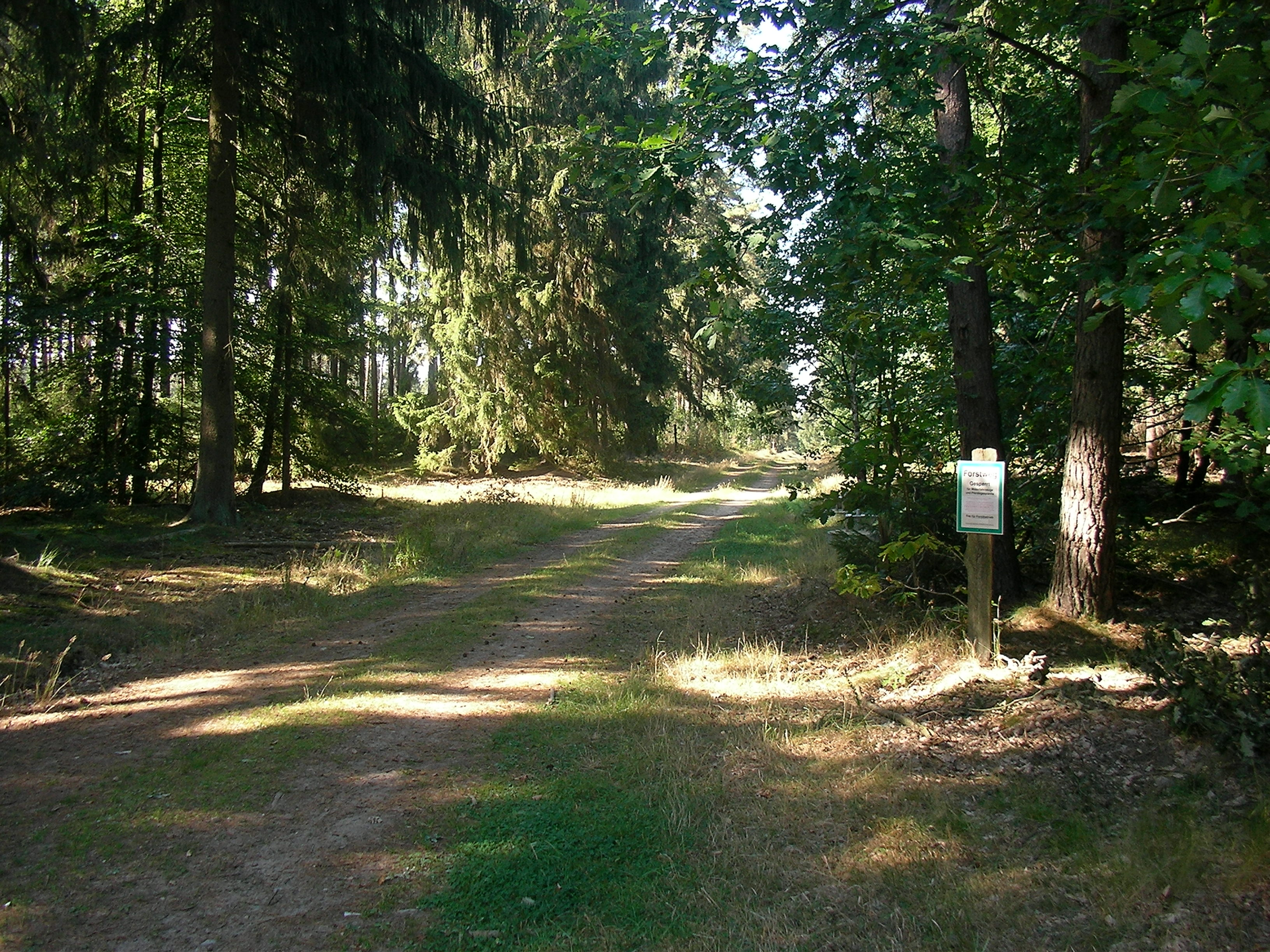
Forest road from the parking lot to forest sectors 147 and 138

On 21 May 1989, Ursula (45 years old) and Peter Reinold (51 years old) from Bergedorf drove to the Göhrde to go for a walk. It is believed that the couple went to a glade in hunting sector 147 to sunbathe or have a picnic. Here they were killed before their bodies were moved and hidden in a nearby depression in the land. The victims were discovered undressed and it is unclear if they were in this state before the murder or if the murderer undressed them himself. The offender also stole the victims' picnic basket and took their car keys, using them to access their vehicle which he later abandoned 300 meters away from the train station in Winsen an der Luhe, a small town in the Hamburg region.

The Reinolds were reported missing and seven weeks later on 12 July 1989, their bodies were discovered by three blueberry collectors. The bodies were in a state of advanced decomposition due to the high temperature, and were partially mummified and skeletonized. While on their way to notify the forester, the collectors met a brown-haired, well-built man who looked about 40 years of age and was carrying a bag. The Kriminalpolizei assumed that this was the perpetrator attempting to seek out more victims.

Due to the condition of the corpses, the exact cause of death could not be explained, although it was clear that it was not suicide or an accident. Strangulation and shooting were considered possible causes. The husband had an injury to his larynx; however, it could not be determined whether this was caused by the perpetrator or by local wildlife such as a wild boar.

=== Second double murder ===
On 12 July 1989, the day of the discovery of the first murders, Ingrid Warmbier (46 years old) from Uelzen and Bernd-Michael Köpping (43 years old), a district manager of the German Lotto and Totoblock from Hanover, drove together to the Göhrde. Warmbier and Köpping were married to other people, but engaged in an affair. After eating lunch in nearby Bad Bevensen, they parked in a small side street near the Forsthaus Röthen and walked more than two kilometers into the forest.

In hunting sector 138 they met the perpetrator, and it is theorised that he threatened them with a firearm before forcing them to lie face down so he could tie their hands and feet with a Leucoplast band. The offender strangled Köpping and killed him with a headshot from a 5.6 mm small-caliber weapon. Warmbier had her skull smashed and received heavy chest injuries; her blouse was lifted up to the level of her bra, which had been cut. She was also shot in the head. The perpetrator then stole Köpping's Polaroid camera and the keys to his Toyota, which he used to leave the area. Further investigation revealed that the perpetrator used the vehicle for about a week before parking it in the vicinity of a spa clinic in Bad Bevensen.

Two weeks later, on 27 July 1989, police officers taking part in the nationwide investigation into the murder of the Reinolds discovered the bodies of Köpping and Warmbier by chance. The date of death was confirmed to have been 12 July 1989, the day the police began their investigation into the first double murder. The location was 800 metres from the site of the first double murder. According to the investigators' reconstructions, the perpetrator committed the second double murder at a time when the Kriminalpolizei were at the scene of the first murders. Subsequent tests revealed that despite the close range of the two sites, gunshots could not be heard between them due to depressions in the land.

=== Parallels ===
The parallels between the two crimes were that a middle-aged couple was murdered in both instances and that both crime scenes were located in the same area of the forest. In each case the offender stole conspicuous technical items, although neither crime resembled a classic robbery, and it is believed that he disposed of these following high public interest in the case. The perpetrator also took both victims' cars and abandoned them in small towns with railway connections, both of which located on the Hanover-Hamburg railway. These parallels prompted investigators to believe that the perpetrator of both crimes was the same person.

=== Aftermath ===
The two double murders had significant consequences for the Göhrde. In German press and television, the forest was called "Totenwald" (Death Forest). Hikers and walkers avoided it for many years.

== Investigations ==
=== Measures ===
Immediately following the discovery of the first crime, the Lower Saxony police formed a special 40-member commission with the detectives from the region and Lüneberg. The commission's appeal created 1,911 records and about 10,000 people were interviewed . A facial composite was created and published with a reward of 50,000 Deutsche Mark. In December 1989 and again in January 1990, the case was broadcast in the television series Aktenzeichen XY… ungelöst (a cold case programme) but it did not lead to success.

As a result of further investigations by police profilers, the perpetrator was characterized as "brutal, aggressive, emotionally cold, a loner, sexually disturbed, mentally ill, choleric, overcorrect" and "introverted". The investigators assumed that he had been a non-smoker, that he could organise his own time, and that he would not have missed a day from work.

The examinations of a number of persons, for example patients of closed psychiatry who were on parole at the time of the crime, as well as the guests of inns, hotels, and spas in nearby Bad Bevensen, did not provide new leads. Likewise, no clues were drawn from the review of all vehicle owners from license plates recorded in the area at the time. Also, the later identified Kurt-Werner Wichmann was checked. He was suspected due to his criminal record and was on sick leave at the time of the double murder (he also did not have to work at the time of the first murder on a Sunday). One witness saw him, but because he had worn glasses, he claimed that Wichmann did not match the facial composite.

Also suspected was the husband of Ingrid Warmbier, the female victim in the second double murder. It was theorized that he had hired somebody to kill his unfaithful wife and lover, and that the hitman accidentally got the wrong couple first.

=== First "clue" ===
After a short time there was an apparent clue. In Wales, a similar double homicide had occurred in June 1989 for which John Cooper (64 years old) was later arrested in May 2009. He was found guilty and sentenced to life imprisonment. The Dixon couple had been on a camping trip at Little Haven when they were shot at close range. The corpses were found away from the road, with the husband's hands tied behind his back. A day before these double murders, witnesses noticed an approximately 40-year-old man whose description was similar to that of the alleged Göhrde murderer. The witnesses also reported a companion of about 20 years of age with a German or Dutch accent. In the Göhrde, police had found a Dutch coin near the first scene. The crime scenes in Germany and Wales were both near UK military training grounds. Despite this, no firm connection between the Göhrde Murders and Cooper has been made.

=== Second "clue" ===
In 1993, a witness heard a man threaten his wife during a quarrel that she should not forget the Göhrde murders and that she might go the same way if she continues to cheat on him. The witness reported their observations to the police. The first superficial review was promising, because the suspect had a firearms permit for a small caliber 5.6 mm gun, the same weapon used in the second double murder. In addition, the appearance of the suspect matched the prepared facial composite. Finally, the suspect came from the area and had local knowledge as a forester. After several months of further investigation, a search warrant was obtained by the police and the forester's house was searched and the weapons were seized. Many hours of interrogation of the suspect and his wife did not lead to success as there were no incriminating circumstances and the suspect had an alibi for the second double murder.

=== Further development ===
The special commission was later dissolved, as it did not find the culprit. The head of the special commission retired in 1997. After that, only two detectives from the former special commission worked on the case, namely an investigator from Lüchow and an investigator from Lüneberg. In 2009, only the detective from Lüneberg was delegated to follow up on occasional hints.

In July 2009 there was another, possibly last investigation approach: the two hairs secured from the vehicle of the Reinolds, which were neither assigned to them nor the environment. The Kriminalpolizei wanted to carry out a new DNA test using more modern methods and compare them with the data stored in their records. The problem of DNA analysis was that the DNA pattern in old, failed, rootless hairs can only be completely isolated with a 60 percent probability. The criminal investigation was still based on the assumption that the two hairs were suitable to identify the perpetrators. In 2014, however, it was stated that the case would not be reopened due to capacity reasons. In June 2017 it was announced that a DNA result linked the crime to the scene of a murder in Hanover in 2015. However, because of another murder and the conviction of a 27-year-old man named Leger, no links were confirmed.

=== Links to the murder of Birgit Meier ===
Decisive evidence for the identification of the perpetrator of the Göhrde murders emerged from the case of Birgit Meier (41 years old) from Lüneberg who disappeared without a trace in 1989, shortly after she separated from her husband. On 15 May 1989, the day of her disappearance, she had had an appointment with her lawyer for the sale of her house in Brietlingen. She had been happy the day before, talking to her mother on the phone about being able to move soon. Suicide and murder by her husband were initially suspected, but later investigations focused on Kurt-Werner Wichmann (43 years old), whom Meier had previously met at a party, according to the husband's statements. Wichmann had previously done gardening work for Meier's neighbours. As early as 1989, there were suspicions against Wichmann in the case of Birgit Meier and he was interrogated, but his alleged alibi was not examined closely. He concealed the fact that he was on sick leave at the time of Meier's disappearance and the police did not thoroughly follow up. Following the appointment of a new prosecutor in Lüneberg, new investigations were begun. In 1993, Wichmann was charged with the murder of Meier and the police raided his house. The investigators found two small caliber rifles, a converted gas pistol, stun guns, a silencer, handcuffs, and sedatives. They also discovered a soundproof torture room that only he and his brother were allowed to enter. A bright red Ford sports coupe was found buried in the backyard, with blood on the backseat.

Kurt-Werner Wichmann fled from the search. He was arrested in the German state of Hesse when he was involved in a traffic accident and weapons were found in his vehicle. In the vehicle was his ten years younger brother, who was supposedly dominated by Wichmann. Ten days after his arrest, Wichmann hanged himself in prison. He left strange farewell letters in which he asked, among other things, for his brother to "clean the gutter". Although there have been no further murders suspected to have been carried out by the same perpetrator since Wichmann's death, investigations against him were discontinued. His vehicle and items were disposed of by the authorities.

=== Private investigation ===
Investigations into the Göhrde murders were resumed due to the initiative of Birgit Meier's brother Wolfgang Sielaff, the retired former chief of the State Criminal Police of Hamburg. In 2002, following his retirement, he began his own private investigation and formed a team with the head of forensic medicine in Hamburg, Klaus Püschel, the defense lawyer Gerhard Strate, and other professionals. In 2013, during a search in a room belonging to Wichmann, Sielaff found videotapes from the Aktenzeichen XY TV episode on the Göhrde murders and newspaper clippings related to it. In 2015, he was able to have a new special commission set up by the Lüneberg police, which investigated the case of Birgit Meier. In 2016, handcuffs related to the case were found stored at the Hannover Medical School. On examination of them, traces of blood were found that had a DNA match with the missing persons. Sielaff also received permission from the new owner of Wichmann's former garage in Bardowick to carry out excavations there. Wichmann's house had been searched in 1993 by the Lüneberg police several times in vain, once even with sniffer dogs. According to the presumptions of the investigators, Wichmann wanted to kidnap Meier to extort money from her husband, but failed.

=== Identification of the offender ===
In December 2017, 28 years after the killings, the Lower Saxony police announced that a new investigation had begun and that they considered Wichmann as the most probable culprit. A trace of his DNA was found in one of the stolen victims' vehicles and according to the police, this was a separate lead from the hair that had been examined years before. The police assume the existence of an accomplice who may have committed other crimes. The essential clue for a second person involved in the case is derived from the fact that Kurt-Werner Wichmann had driven into the Göhrde with his own vehicle, but returned with the vehicles of the murder victims. It remained unclear how he recovered his own car. According to Sielaff's findings, there were 21 unsolved murder cases in Lüneberg and the surrounding areas which could be attributed to Wichmann by the perpetrator profile and their respective whereabouts. Possibly, according to the assessments of the police, Wichmann committed murders in other areas. After his release from prison in 1975, he spent three years in Karlsruhe, where he lived with an elderly woman whom he had met through a personal advert during his detention. During this time, there were several unsolved murders of hitchhikers in Karlsruhe. Wichmann was very mobile and had five cars.

On 19 January 2018, following a post-mortem, it was announced by the Hannover Medical School that Birgit Meier had been shot. The Lüneberg Police President Robert Kruse said it could have been a serial killer who killed abroad. He announced a thorough review of old cases, hoping to pinpoint Wichmann as a perpetrator. As a result, analysts from the State Criminal Police Office of Lower Saxony filtered 24 unsolved cases, in particular homicides and missing persons. In February 2018, the case was again featured in Aktenzeichen XY.. ungelöst.

In 2018, using sniffer dogs and metal detectors, the police and 30 detectives searched Wichmann's former property for more than two weeks. Approximately 400 items were secured, which were investigated by the State Office of Criminal Investigation of Lower Saxony for connections to other murders. These included a Polaroid camera and binoculars.

In the autumn of 2018 a suitcase appeared that had been lying in an attic in an industrial area in Lüneburg for years, containing two firearms with ammunition and a driver's license in the name of Wichmann issued in Karlsruhe in 1976. The suitcase was taken by the Lüneburg used car dealer Michael Volkert to the Landeszeitung für die Lüneburger Heide, a regional daily newspaper, which in turn handed it over to the police. The used car dealer had probably received this from his friend Hans Rudloff, the husband of Wichmann's widow, who died in early 2017.

=== TV series ===
German television channel Das Erste screened the award-winning 2020 mini-series Das Geheimnis des Totenwaldes ('Mystery of the Death Forest', released internationally as Dark Woods), based on the murders. They also replayed three documentaries, Eiskalte Spur – Die Göhrde-Morde und die verschwundene Frau ('Cold Trace – The Göhrde murders and the lost woman'). These informed audiences that according to German law, the death of a suspect closes investigation, which explains why investigations were discontinued.
