= Dig Deep =

Dig Deep may refer to:

- Dig Deep (album), by After the Burial, 2016
- "Dig Deep" (song), from the American TV series Smash, 2012

== See also ==
- Dig Deeper (disambiguation)
