= Kurt-Werner Wichmann =

German serial killer

- Born: 8 July 1949; Adendorf, West Germany
- Died: 25 April 1993 (aged 43); Heimsheim, Germany
- Cause of death: Suicide by hanging
- Years active: 1989
- Conviction: None
- Penalty: None

Details
- Victims: 4–21+
- Country: West Germany
- State: Lower Saxony

Kurt-Werner Wichmann (8 July 1949 – 25 April 1993) was a German serial killer who was possibly linked to the Göhrde Murders.

== Early life ==
At the age of 14, Wichmann was sent to a young offenders' institution after threatening a tenant in his parents' house with a knife and trying to strangle her. At that time, Wichmann did not live at home, but at a care home in Wichernstift. He did not want to stay there any longer, and so he stole money from his parents. His father was a violent man who reportedly mistreated his sons.

When he was 16 years old, Wichmann attacked a cyclist and sexually abused her, for which he received six months' probation. In 1967, he threatened police officers with a small-calibre weapon. He was sentenced to one year of juvenile detention. In 1968, 38-year-old Ilse G. was shot four times in the back with a small-calibre rifle while riding a bicycle in a forest near Lüneburg. She died on the spot. Witnesses saw a youth fitting Wichmann's description fleeing the scene, and the police started a file on him. Although small-calibre rifles and newspaper clippings were found in his possession, Wichmann was not charged. In 1970, Wichmann was sentenced to five-and-a-half years of juvenile punishment for the rape of a hitchhiker, whom he also tried to strangle. The hitchhiker managed to persuade him to let her go. When Wichmann read the news in the newspaper, he felt misrepresented and went to the police to correct this, which led to his arrest.

== Description ==
Wichmann was described as a blond, down-to-earth man with a well-groomed appearance. A witness described him as a silent man with "cold, icy eyes eyeing everything". Others described him as an arrogant and egotistical loner.

He lived in a house in a cul-de-sac on the forested edge of Lüneberg. He grew up in that house, had a German Shepherd, and leaned toward fascist political attitudes – on his property he occasionally hoisted the Reichskriegsflagge. Over time, he made several modifications to the house, including secret caches and a door that was essentially a trapdoor, leading to an open space without flooring.

== Disappearance of Birgit Meier ==
In 1989, Birgit Meier went missing from her home. A few weeks after her daughter filed a missing person report, connections between her and Wichmann became apparent. Initially, investigators suspected that she had died by suicide or been killed by her estranged husband, but they later focused the investigation on Wichmann, who was working as a gardener at the Lüneburg cemetery. Meier had previously met Wichmann at a party, according to statements from her husband. Wichmann had done gardening work for some of the Meiers' neighbours. Wichmann was interrogated and, despite a rather questionable alibi, which alleged he had spent the evening with his wife and later walked the dog, he was not checked closely. He also concealed the fact that he was on sick leave at the time of Meier's disappearance, but the police did not inquire further.

Only with the establishment of a new prosecutor in Lüneberg did further investigations begin. In 1993, charges of suspected murder in Birgit Meier's case were brought against Wichmann, and the police searched his house. Investigators found two small-calibre rifles, a converted sharp gas pistol, stun guns, mufflers, handcuffs, sedatives and sleeping pills, as well as a secret torture room with a soundproof door, which only he and his brother were allowed to enter. There was a red Ford sports coupe found buried in the backyard, with blood on its back seat. Body-tracking dogs were used several times to search the property, but no bodies were found.

Wichmann fled and was arrested in Heilbronn when he was involved in a traffic accident; weapons were found in his vehicle. His younger brother, with whom he had a close relationship, was in the seat next to him. Ten days after his arrest, 43-year-old Wichmann hanged himself in the Heimsheim Prison. He had attempted suicide previously. He left strange farewell letters in which, among other things, he asked his brother to clean the gutter; investigators suspected that Wichmann used code to give his brother orders, but the brother refused to cooperate with the police. As no trace of Birgit Meier had been found at the time of Wichmann's suicide, the investigation was discontinued; this is also in accordance with German law, which does not allow a dead suspect to be further investigated. His vehicle and the items found in it were consequently disposed of by police.

=== 21st-century investigations ===
Birgit Meier's remains were recovered in 2017 under the concrete floor of a garage of a house on the outskirts of Lüneburg that Wichmann had previously occupied.

On 19 January 2018, the autopsy results were published in an autopsy report by the Hannover Medical School; Birgit Meier had been shot. Lüneberg Police President Robert Kruse stated that the perpetrator was a serial killer who may have killed beyond Germany. He announced a thorough review of old cases, with Wichmann being considered as a possible suspect. As a result, analysts from the State Criminal Police Office of Lower Saxony filtered out 24 unsolved cases, in particular homicides and missing persons.

The success of the police investigation was due in part to policeman Wolfgang Sielaff, the brother of the murdered Birgit Meier, who began with private research in 2002 and found his sister's body in 2017. In the same year, the police set up a new six-member investigative force which investigated Wichmann's potential connections with more than 20 other murder victims.

In February 2018, the case was featured on the television show Aktenzeichen XY... ungelöst, as the investigators suspected that there was a helper, accomplice or a confidant. In November 2021, Netflix released Dig Deeper: The Disappearance of Birgit Meier.

== Göhrde murders ==
In December 2017, 28 years after the 1989 murders, the Lower Saxony Police announced that the former cemetery gardener Wichmann was a prime suspect in the Göhrde murders, and an investigation team was set up. DNA traces from one of the victim's stolen vehicles was linked to Wichmann. The police assumed that there was also an accomplice who may have committed other crimes. The essential clue for a second person involved in the case derives from the fact that Wichmann had driven his motor vehicle into the Göhrde but had returned with that of the victim. It is unknown if someone brought his car back. According to Sielaff's findings, there were 21 unresolved murder cases in Lüneberg and the surrounding area, which could possibly be assigned to Wichmann.

== See also ==
- List of German serial killers
