= Project Medusa =

International law enforcement agency

Project Medusa is an international law enforcement operation, targeting online networks that facilitate drug-facilitated sexual assaults (DFSA). Launched in April 2026 it is led by Germany's Federal Criminal Police Office (BKA) and the Hamburg State Criminal Police Office, together with the United Kingdom's National Crime Agency (NCA), with coordination support of from Europol. The operation focuses on DFSA occurring in intimate partner settings, with particular attention to misogynistic online communities in which perpetrators exchange advice, share footage of assaults and discuss methods of incapacitating victims.

Nine countries participate in the operation Brazil, Canada, France, Germany, Hungary, the Netherlands, Spain, the UK and the US. Its stated objectives are to identify victims and offenders, disrupt online DFSA networks and strengthen cross border cooperation through intelligence sharing and coordinated investigations.

In June 2026, investigators from the participating countries convened at the NCA's headquarters in London. Europol subsequently reported that the operation had identified 156 victims and perpetrators, uncovered 4 previously unknown DFSA related networks and generated 274 new investigative leads.

== Background ==
Drug-facilitated sexual assault (DFSA) is a form of sexual violence in which alcohol, prescription medication, or illicit drugs are administered to impair a victim's ability to consent to or resist sexual activity. Victims are predominantly women and predators are frequently drawn from the victim's immediate social circle, including intimate partners or individuals exploiting a position of trust or professional authority. Law enforcement agencies have reported that offenders increasingly use online platforms to exchange advice on incapacitating victims, discuss methods of evading detection and share images and videos recording documenting assaults.

According to Europol, investigations have identified online communities dedicated to facilitating DFSA offences, including groups that normalize offensive behavior, distribute abuse material and encourage members to commit sexual assaults. Such content is typically circulated through social media, encrypted messages services and pornographic platforms. The transnational characters of these networks, combined with their reliance on encrypted communications and cross platform coordination, prompted several national law enforcement agencies to establish a coordinated international response. This response, Project Medusa, was launched in April 2026, to improve cross-border intelligence sharing, identify victims and offenders and disrupt online communities involved in DFSA related crimes.

== June 2026 operational week ==
From 22 to 24 June 2026, Project Medusa held a three-day coordination meeting at the headquarters of the United Kingdom's National Crime Agency (NCA) in London. The meeting brought together 29 investigators from participating law enforcement to share intelligence, examine digital evidence and coordinate cross border enquiries into online drug-facilitated sexual assault (DFSA) networks, with the aim of identifying victims and suspects linked to DFSA-related offences. According to Europol, the meeting resulted in the identification of 156 victims and perpetrators, the discovery of four previously unknown DFSA related criminal networks and the development of 274 new investigative leads for participating countries to pursue.

== See also ==
- Pelicot rape case
- Europol
- Royal Canadian Mounted Police
- Operation DisrupTor
