= Federal Criminal Police Office (Germany) =

German federal investigative police agency

Coordinates: 50°05′52″N 8°14′45″E

Federal Criminal Police Office Bundeskriminalamt
- Main logo of the BKA
- Abbreviation: BKA

Agency overview
- Formed: 15 March 1951 (75 years ago)
- Preceding agency: Criminal Police Office for the British Zone
- Employees: 7,130
- Annual budget: €792 million (2021)

Jurisdictional structure
- Federal agency (Operations jurisdiction): Germany
- Operations jurisdiction: Germany
- Legal jurisdiction: As defined in the Bundeskriminalamtgesetz
- Constituting instrument: Law on the Establishment of the Federal Criminal Police Office (German: BKA-Gesetz) and Basic Law for the Federal Republic of Germany ("German: Grundgesetz")
- General nature: Federal law enforcement

Operational structure
- Headquarters: Wiesbaden
- Agency executive: Holger Münch, Chief
- Parent agency: Federal Ministry of the Interior, Building and Community
- Divisions: 11: International Coordination, Training and Research Center (IZ); State Security (ST); Serious and Organized Crime (SO); International Terrorism (TE); CyberCrime (CC); Close Protection Division (SG); Operational Mission and Investigative Support (OE); Central Information Management (ZI); Forensic Science Institute (KT); Information Technology (IT); Central and Administrative Affairs (ZV)

Facilities
- Stations: Wiesbaden, Meckenheim, Berlin

Website
- www.bka.de; Federal Criminal Police Office on X; Federal Criminal Police Office on Facebook; Federal Criminal Police Office's channel on YouTube

The Federal Criminal Police Office of Germany (German: Bundeskriminalamt, pronounced [bʊndəskʁimiˈnaːlʔamt], abbreviated BKA) is the federal investigative police agency of Germany, directly subordinated to the Federal Ministry of the Interior. It is headquartered in Wiesbaden, Hesse, and maintains major branch offices in Berlin and Meckenheim near Bonn. It has been headed by Holger Münch since December 2014.

Primary jurisdiction of the agency includes coordinating cooperation between the federation and state police forces, investigating cases of international organized crime, terrorism and other cases related to national security as well as providing protection to members of constitutional institutions and federal witnesses. When requested by the respective state authorities or the federal minister of the interior, it also assumes responsibility for investigations in certain large-scale cases. Furthermore, the Attorney General of Germany can direct it to investigate cases of special public interest.

== History ==
The Federal Criminal Police Office was established in 1951, and Wiesbaden, in the State of Hesse, was designated as its seat.

The German police in general is – by definition of the German constitution – organized at the level of the states of the federation (e.g. North Rhine-Westphalia Police, Bavarian State Police, Berlin Police). Exceptions are the Federal Police, the Federal Criminal Police Office (BKA) and the German Parliament Police. Because of historic reasons all these federal police forces have a specific and limited legal jurisdiction. This is because after World War II, it was decided that there should not be another all-powerful police force like the Reich Security Main Office (consisting of the Gestapo, Sicherheitsdienst, the Reichskriminalpolizeiamt).

== Missions ==
The formation of the BKA is based on several articles of the German constitution, which give the federal government the exclusive ability to pass laws on the coordination of criminal policing in Germany.

The jurisdictions of the BKA are defined in the Bundeskriminalamtgesetz (BKAG):

- Investigation and threat prevention in cases of national and international terrorism.
- Investigating the international trade with narcotics, arms, munitions, explosives and internationally organized money-laundering and counterfeiting.
- Investigating crimes when a state public prosecutor, a state police force or the state's interior minister, the federal public prosecutor or the Federal Ministry of the Interior (Germany) task the BKA with a criminal investigation.
- Personal protection of the constitutional bodies of Germany and their foreign guests, e.g. the President of Germany, Parliament of Germany, Cabinet of Germany, Federal Constitutional Court and other institutions), the BKA also investigates major crimes against these institutions.
- Protection of federal witnesses.
- Investigating crimes against critical infrastructures in Germany.
- Coordinating cooperation between the federal and state police forces (especially state criminal investigation authorities) and with foreign investigative authorities (in Germany the state police forces are mainly responsible for policing).
- Coordinating the cooperation with international law enforcement agencies like the FBI. The BKA is also the national central bureau for Europol and Interpol. Additionally, the BKA provides liaison officers for over 60 German embassies worldwide, who work with local law enforcement agencies.
- Collecting and analyzing criminal intelligence as a national crime office.
- Providing IT-Infrastructure for German law enforcement agencies, e.g. police databases INPOL, Schengen Information System, Automated Fingerprint Identification System (AFIS), Anti-Terror-Database (ATD).
- Providing assistance to other national and international law enforcement agencies in forensic and criminological research matters.
- Acting as a clearing house for identifying and cataloging images and information on victims of child sexual exploitation, similar to the National Center for Missing & Exploited Children in the United States.

== Organization ==
Since its establishment in 1951, the BKA's number of staff has grown substantially. This has notably been driven by the fight against the left-wing terrorism in the 1970s and the internationalization of crime in the decades thererafter. Thus its structure has been undergoing constant reorganized. The last major reform was implemented in July 2016 and resulted in the structure described below.

The BKA is currently organized in eleven divisions. The President of the BKA is supported by its staff in the so-called "Leitungsstab" (which has not the status of a division):

=== Staff LS – Management ===
(in German: Stab LS – Leitungsstab)

- Office of the BKA-President and the Vice-Presidents
- Press and media relations
- Law enforcement advisement, situation reporting
- Strategic affairs
- Resources, organization
- National cooperation

=== Division ZI – Central Information Management ===
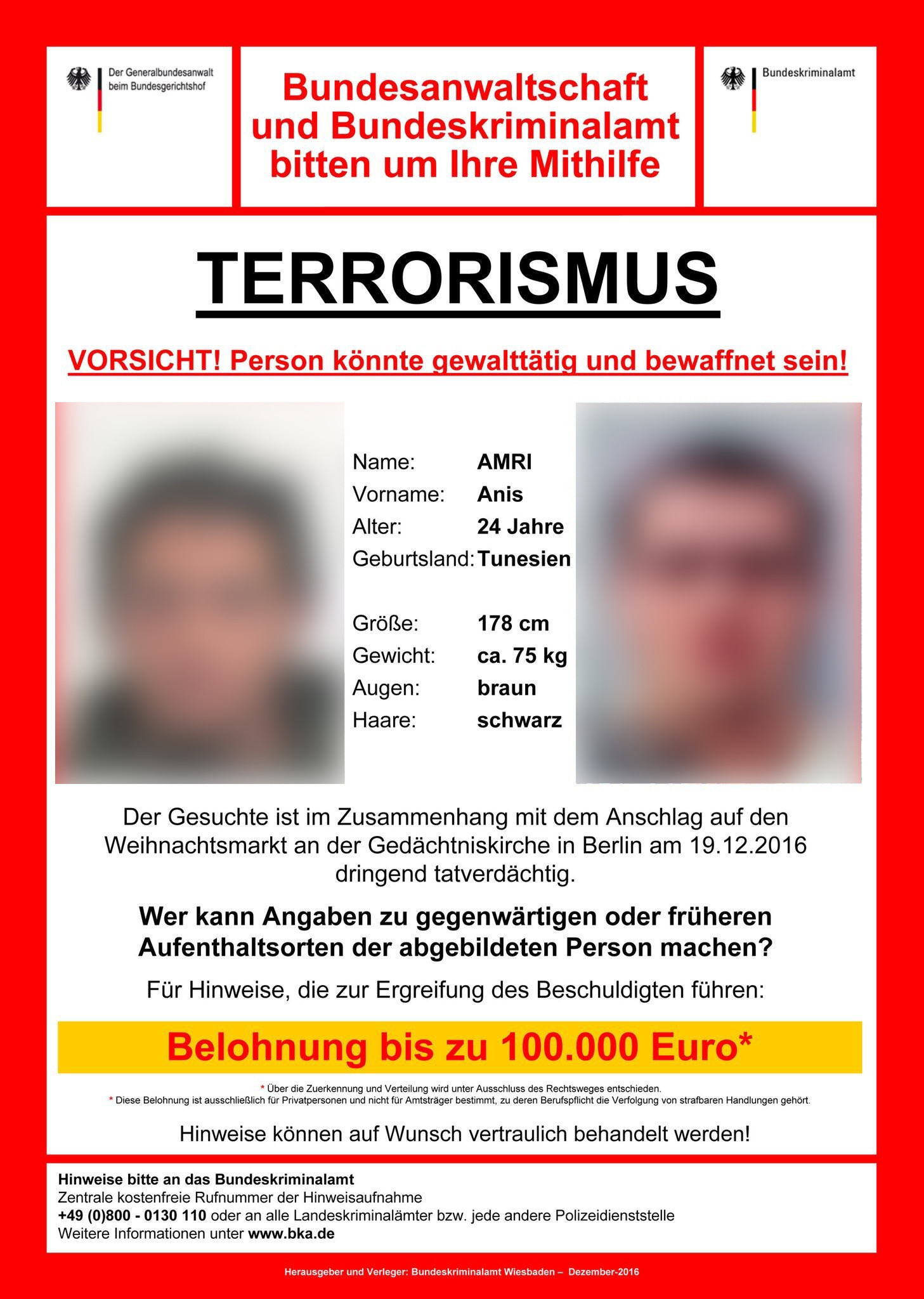
Wanted poster of the BKA

(in German: Abteilung ZI – Zentrales Informationsmanagment)

- 24/7 Operations Center
- Language and translation service
- Information and data services, police records administration
- Law enforcement information and message exchange
- Security screening / vetting
- Identification services
  - Automatic Fingerprint Identification System (AFIS)
  - DNA-Analytics Database
  - facial recognition system (GES)
  - Identikit pictures
- Fugitive and search services (International police cooperation, Legal assistance agreements)
  - Common search, public search/manhunt
  - Schengen Searches (SIRENE)
  - Interpol searches
  - Target searches, manhunt

=== Division ST – State Security ===
(in German: Abteilung ST – Polizeilicher Staatsschutz)

- Situational reporting, analysis
- Threat assessment
- Situation center, State Security
- National security, Politically motivated crime – terrorism / extremism
  - Left-wing and right-wing politically motivated crime, including the cooperation with the Z Commission
  - State sponsored terrorism
  - Politically motivated crime by foreigners
- Politically motivated arms crime, proliferation, CBRN arms
- Counter-espionage
- State sponsored cybercrime and cyber-espionage
- War crimes, Crimes against international criminal law and humanity (including German central office for international criminal law)
- Financial investigations, State Security

=== Division SO – Serious and Organized Crime ===
(in German: Abteilung SO – Schwere und Organisierte Kriminalität)

- Property crime
- Counterfeiting
- Cybercrime
- Capital and major crimes, violent crimes, sexual offences, child abuse and child pornography (similar to the National Center for Missing and Exploited Children)
- Organized and gang crimes
- Drug crimes
- Human trafficking
- Environmental crimes
- Crimes concerning arms and explosives
- Financial and Economic crime,
  - comprising a specialised unit for case-integrated financial investigations (VIVA), that also assumes the role of Asset Recovery Office Germany (police) and a forensic auditing service (WPD)

=== Division SG – Security Group ===
(in German: Abteilung SG – Sicherungsgruppe)

- SG E (Operations)
  - Personal protection details (Protection of the German Chancellor and other cabinet members)
  - Foreign dignitary protection (when invited by the federal government)
  - Reconnaissance and mobile support units
  - Special units like the ASE (Foreign Special Missions) which have similar tasks like the Secret Service Counter Assault Team
- SG F (Situation center)
  - Mission support, internal organization and logistics
  - Tactical Operations Center

The Protection Group protects the members of Germany's constitutional bodies and their foreign guests and is often the most visible part of the BKA. Specially selected and trained officers with special equipment and vehicles provide round-the-clock personal security to those they protect. The Protection Group is now headquartered in Berlin.

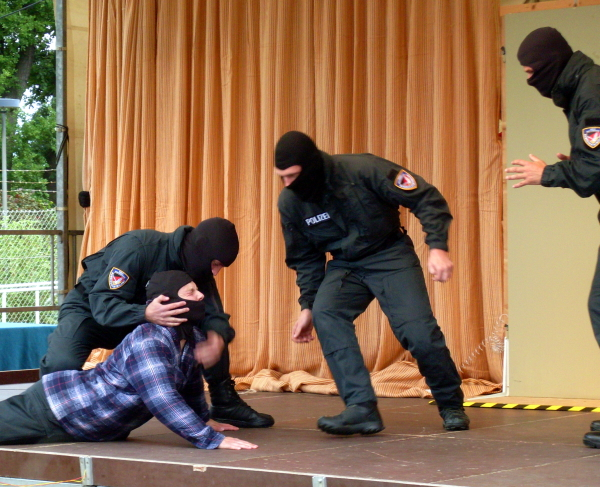
Arrest presentation of the BKA MEK

=== Division OE – Operational Mission and Investigative Support ===
(in German: Abteilung OE – Operative Einsatz- und Ermittlungsunterstützung)

- Technical Operational Service (TOS)
  - Technology monitoring, logistics
    - Analysis of (new) technologies (evaluation for law enforcement use and criminal potential)
  - IT forensics
    - Case and mission support, e.g. at crime scenes and while conducting search warrants
    - Securing and processing of digital evidence
    - Research and development, live forensics
  - (Mass) Data analysis, Video Competence Center (CC Video)
  - Technical Mission Support, development of technical equipment
- Comptence Center for Information Technology Surveillance (CC ITÜ), Lawful interception
  - Telecommunications Surveillance (TKÜ)
  - Information Technology Surveillance (ITÜ)
- Mobile Mission Commando (MEK)
  - Plain-clothes SWAT unit specialised in surveillance and apprehension of fugitives in mobile situations
  - Central federal support group for major nuclear threat defense (ZUB)
- Adviser and Negotiation Group, e.g. for hostage-takings in foreign countries
- Witness protection program (federal level)

=== Division KT – Forensic Science Institute ===
(in German: Abteilung KT – Kriminalistisches Institut)

- Disaster Victims Identification Task Force
  - The DVI-Team is an event driven organisation of mainly forensic specialists dedicated to identification of disaster victims. The DVI's past missions include several airplane crashes, the Eschede train disaster and the 2004 Indian Ocean earthquake.
- Crime scene unit
- Bomb squad, explosive ordnance disposal (EOD) and improvised explosive ordnance disposal (IEDD), CBRN crime scenes
- Research and development on crime scene procedures
- Institution for technical and natural sciences, reporting for law enforcement, public prosecutors and courts
  - Ballicstics, arson and explosion investigations
  - DNA analytics, investigation of material and micro traces
  - Analysis of handwritings and documents, voice recognition
  - Central laboratory for physical, biological and chemical analysis, toxicology
  - Digital electronics, data reconstruction, video, picture, signal and krypto analysis

=== Division IT – Information Technology ===
(in German: Abteilung IT – Informationstechnik)

- Information and communication management
  - common IT software, e.g. operation systems, office tools
  - law enforcement databases, e.g. various INPOL databases, Europol (SIENA), Schengen (SIRENE), anti-terror-database (ATD)
  - digital (police) radio management, mobile communications

=== Division IZ – International Coordination, Training and Research Center ===
(in German: Abteilung IZ – Internationale Koordinierung, Bildungs- und Forschungszentrum)

- EU and international cooperation, e.g. Europol and Interpol
- Coordination of BKA liaison officers at German embassies
- Consulting center for police legal questions, law enforcement and legal politics
- Police training (national/international)
  - Common training, management
  - Specialised criminal police training, police training
  - International police training and logistics support
- Institute of Law Enforcement Studies
  - Federal University, Departmental Branch of the Federal Criminal Police
  - Criminological and law enforcement research
    - Research and consulting center terrorism/extremism
    - Research and consulting center law enforcement statistics, dark field research
    - Research and consulting center cybercrime
    - Research and consulting center organized crime, economic crime, criminal prevention
- Public relations, internet editorial staff

=== Division ZV – Central and Administrative Affairs ===
(in German: Abteilung ZV – Zentral- und Verwaltungsaufgaben)

- Common human resources management
- Facility management
- Budget management
- Internal organization
- Operations and internal security
- Prevention of corruption
- Logistics, car pool, workshops
- Legal affairs

=== Division TE - International terrorism, religious motivated extremism and terrorism ===
Established on November 1, 2019 the division TE consists of sections from the division ST who are tasked with the collection of information and investigations in the fields of terrorism, religiously motivated extremism and jihadism.

=== Division CC - Cybercrime ===
The division's main tasks lie in investigations in the fields of cybercrime and computer-oriented crime

- Investigations against individuals and networks which target high-profile targets in Germany
- Information gathering and analysis as assistance of ongoing investigations
- Combating cyber-attacks against critical infrastructure and institutions of the German government
- Consulting in the development of strategies and legal frameworks in combating cybercrime

== Joint centres and task forces ==
The BKA is part of several joint centers and platforms for combatting crime:

- Joint Counter-Terrorism Centre (GTAZ)
  - The GTAZ was created in 2004 as a fusion center for 40 German law enforcement, intelligence and other public agencies who are tasked with combatting international jihadi terrorism. Its goal is to optimize and speed up communication between these agencies as a cooperation platform. The GTAZ is not an agency of its own. All participating agencies work under their own jurisdiction. It is located in Berlin.
  - All state police forces (16), state intelligence services (16), the Federal Criminal Police Office (through its Division ST), the uniformed Federal Police (former border patrol), the Military Counterintelligence Service, the Federal Intelligence Service, the Federal Office for the Protection of the Constitution, the Public Prosecutor General, the Customs Investigations Bureau and the Federal Office for Migration and Refugees are part of the GTAZ.
  - The GTAZ has several working groups which focus on threat assessment, operational information exchange, case analysis, structural analysis and other topics.
- Joint Terrorism and Extremism Prevention Centre (GETZ)
  - The GETZ is a similar fusion center established in 2012. It was structured after the model of and parallel to the GTAZ. It is located in Cologne and focuses on politically-motivated crime like right and left-wing extremism and terrorism, espionage, proliferation and international terrorism (not including jihadi terrorism). The GTAZ is not an agency of its own. All participating agencies work under their own jurisdiction.
  - All state police forces (16), state intelligence services (16), the Federal Criminal Police Office (through its Division ST), the uniformed Federal Police (former border patrol), the Military Counterintelligence Service, the Federal Intelligence Service, the Federal Office for the Protection of the Constitution, the Public Prosecutor General, the Customs Investigations Bureau and the Federal Office for Migration and Refugees are part of the GTAZ.
  - The GTAZ has several working groups which focus on threat assessment, operational information exchange and other topics.
- National Cyber Threat Prevention Centre (NCAZ)
  - The NCAZ is a fusion center focusing on cyber threat, their assessment and possible countermeasures. Like the GTAZ it is just a platform and not an agency of its own. It has no own jurisdiction.
  - The Federal Office for Information Security, the Federal Criminal Police Office (BKA), the uniformed Federal Police (former border patrol), the Military Counterintelligence Service, the Federal Intelligence Service and the Federal Office for the Protection of the Constitution are part of the NCAZ.
- Joint Analysis and Strategy Centre Illegal Migration (GASIM)
  - The GASIM is a federal information and communication center combatting illegal migration. It is administered by the Federal Police (former border patrol) and located at Potsdam.
- Joint Financial Investigative Unit (GFG)
  - The BKA Division SO has established a standing GFG (task force) with the Customs Investigations Bureau combatting financial crimes, especially money laundering.
- Joint Internet Centre (GIZ)
  - The GIZ is a cooperation platform for evaluating and analysing jihadi terrorist propaganda on websites and social media channels. It should bring together the professional and technical expertise of the participating agencies. It is administered by the Federal Office for the Protection of the Constitution.
  - The Federal Criminal Police Office (BKA), the Military Counterintelligence Service, the Federal Intelligence Service, the Federal Office for the Protection of the Constitution and the Public Prosecutor General are part of the GIZ. They all work under their own jurisdiction.
- Coordinated Internet Intelligence (KIA)
  - The KIA is another cooperation platform for evaluating and analysing extremist and terrorist internet propaganda. It was created in 2012 after the model of the GIZ. At first it brought together the professional and technical expertise of the participating agencies in the field of right-wing extremism. It was a direct reaction to the discovery of the NSU murders.
  - Now and in contrast to the GIZ, KIA is divided into three platforms as further fields were added: KIA-R covers right-wing extremism and terrorism, KIA-L covers left-wing extremism and terrorism and KIA-A covers international politically-motivated crime (except jiadi terrorism).
  - The Federal Criminal Police Office (BKA), the Military Counterintelligence Service and the Federal Office for the Protection of the Constitution are part of the GIZ. They all work under their own jurisdiction.

For special cases the BKA creates task forces, which are called "Besondere Aufbauorganisation" (abbreviated: BAO). These task forces can integrate personnel from different divisions and state police forces as well. On some occasions international police forces participate too.

== Personnel ==
=== General structure ===
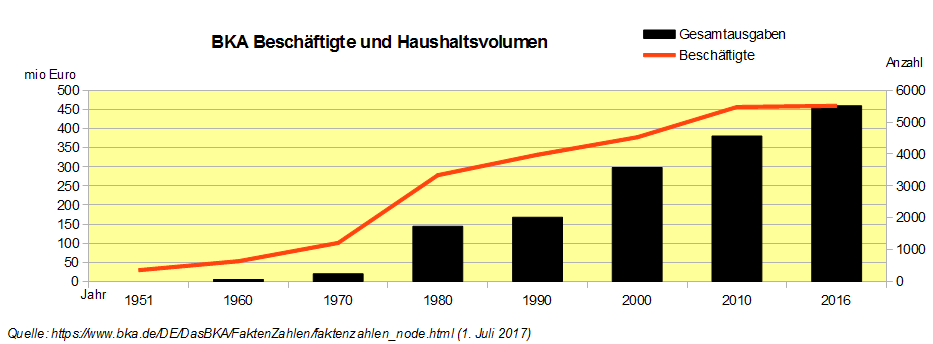
Federal Criminal Police Office (Germany) number of employees (red) and budget in million euro (black)

The BKA currently employs more than 7100 people (as of July 2020). More than 3800 are sworn law enforcement officers of various ranks including upper management. Furthermore, the BKA has more than 1100 civil servants (e.g. analysts as well as administrative or technical personnel). Another 2200 employees work for the BKA as scientists (forensic and natural sciences) and academics (criminology and law enforcement research).

The BKA received more than 1,000 additional job positions in 2017.

In the case of law enforcement officers, the BKA has employees in two career tracks of the German civil service. In the upper service (pay grades A9-A13g, comparable to military officer ranks up to Captain) or in the higher service (pay grades A13h and above, comparable to military staff officer ranks of Major and above). In contrast, some state police forces in Germany such as Bavarian State Police and the Federal Police also have lower level career tracks with only two years of training and lower entrance requirements).

=== Recruitment ===
The BKA recruits its personnel through different procedures: civilian personnel (e.g. analysts, scientists, administrative personnel) are recruited in a similar manner to private companies. Potential law enforcement officers are recruited through a longer process. They have to pass a written and oral exam (interview, group discussions, psychological test), a sport test (endurance, strength, reaction), a medical examination and security screening. Personnel of the upper service usually needs to have passed a university entrance qualification (usually Abitur or Fachabitur).

Law enforcement personnel in the career path of the higher service generally need to have passed a master's degree or a second state examination for direct recruitment. As a rule, the few directly recruited law enforcement officers for this career path are usually lawyers. However, a large proportion of the officers in the BKA's higher service career path are promoted law enforcement officers from the upper career path, who have proven themselves very well.

=== Police training ===
After the law enforcement officer applicants for the upper career path pass the mentioned exams, they study at the Federal University for Applied Administrative Sciences (Departmental Branch of the Federal Criminal Police) for three years at different locations. While studying (law, criminal proceedings, constitutional law, criminology, police tactics, ethics) they also receive traditional police training like martial arts (krav maga, jiu-jitsu, judo), shooting, basic driving and crime scene investigation. During their studies the police candidates complete an 6-month internship at a local state police office and an 6-month internship in several investigative, support and analysis units of the BKA.

Higher service personnel of the BKA study for two years at the German Police University in Münster (formerly the Police Command and Staff Academy). There they usually earn a Master of Arts degree in police management. They study together with the officers on the same career path of the Federal Police and the police forces of the federal states.

=== Police ranks ===
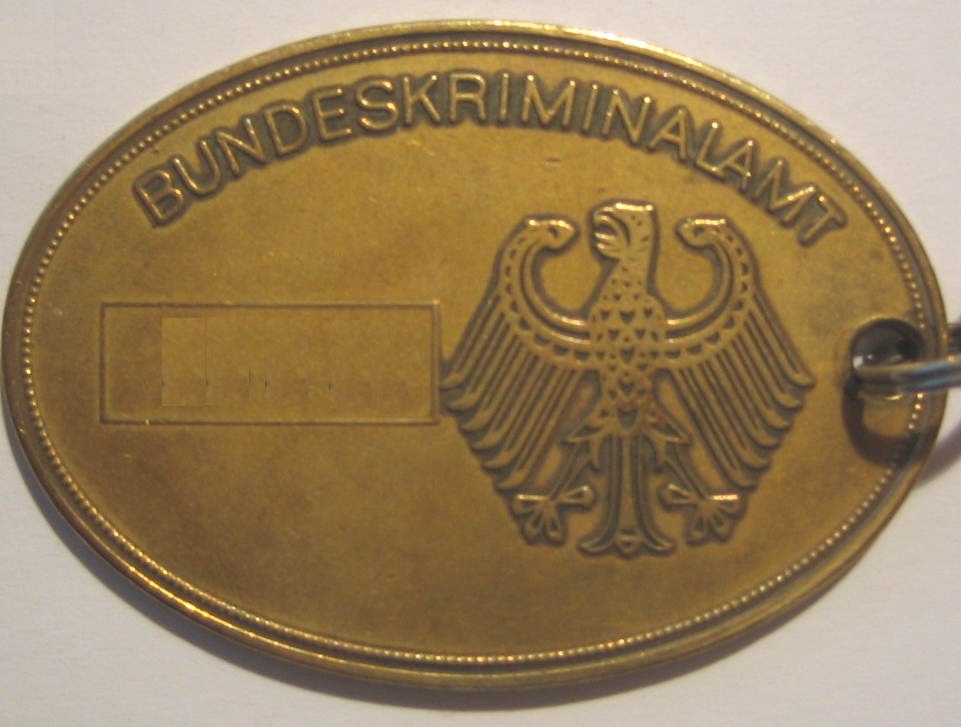
Badge of a BKA police officer

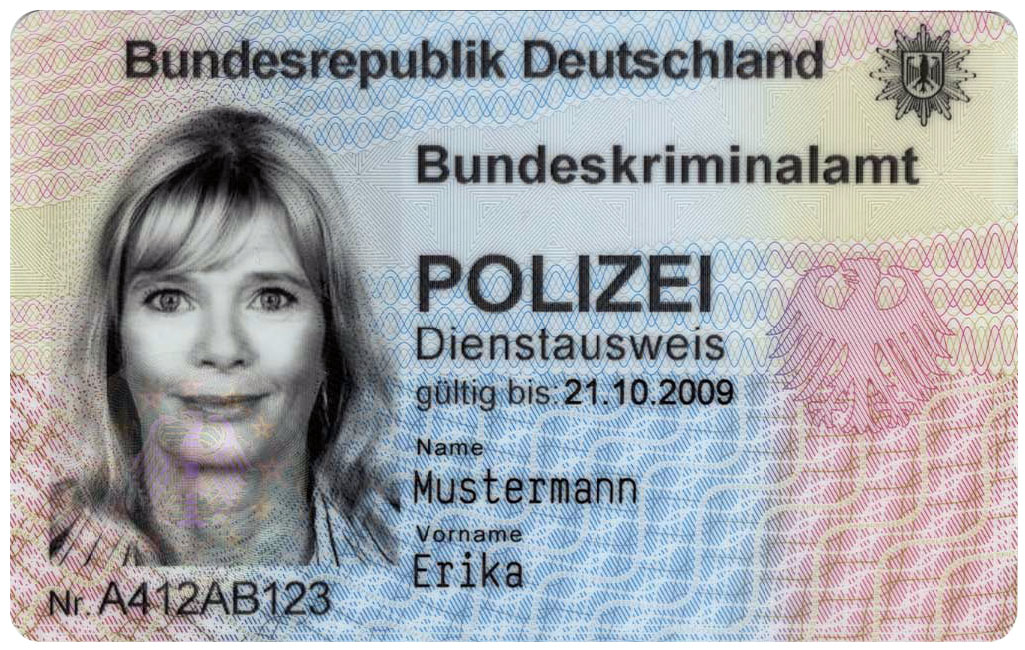
Specimen of official BKA ID-badge

The BKA has the same rank structure as the other police forces in Germany. As a criminal police branch, the different ranks are preceded by the description "Kriminal-". The uniformed police forces normally have the description "Polizei-" like "Polizeikommissar". The rank of police candidates or recruits is "Kriminalkommissaranwärter (KKA)". The entry level after finishing the three year studies is "Kriminalkommissar", meaning Detective Inspector. The criminal police ranks are divided into the "Gehobener Dienst" (upper service) and "Höherer Dienst" (higher service). The upper service is the investigative level of the BKA. The higher service could be described as the middle management of the BKA. To enter the higher service members of the upper service have to pass an additional exam. After passing the test and acception for the higher service, these recruits have to study an additional two years at police university in Münster. The higher service can also be entered by external, non-police personnel from selected academic fields.

Criminal Police Ranks
| Upper Service | Paygrade | Higher Service | Paygrade |
|---|---|---|---|
| Kriminalkommissar | A9 | Kriminalrat | A13 |
| Kriminaloberkommissar | A10 | Kriminaloberrat | A14 |
| Kriminalhauptkommissar | A11 | Kriminaldirektor | A15 |
| Kriminalhauptkommissar | A12 | Leitender Kriminaldirektor | A16 |
| Erster Kriminalhauptkommissar | A13 | | |

=== Leadership ===
The BKA is headed by three top executives, a chief (Präsident des Bundeskriminalamtes) and two vice-chiefs (Vizepräsidnet beim Bundeskriminalamt), which in German BKA-lingo are referred to as "Amtsleitung", to be translated into 'agency management'.

The chief of the BKA is a political civil servant, who is appointed by the President of Germany upon recommendation from the Minister of the Interior and the cabinet. The chied can be provisionally retired by the federal president, as stipulated in §54 of the Law on Federal Civil Servants. The post is graded as B9 in the payscale for federal civil servants (which is the same as a lieutenant general or a vice admiral in the armed forces).

The vice-chiefs, who to this day have mostly been career officials from the ranks, are in the B6 paygrade. Anlage I BBesG - Einzelnorm

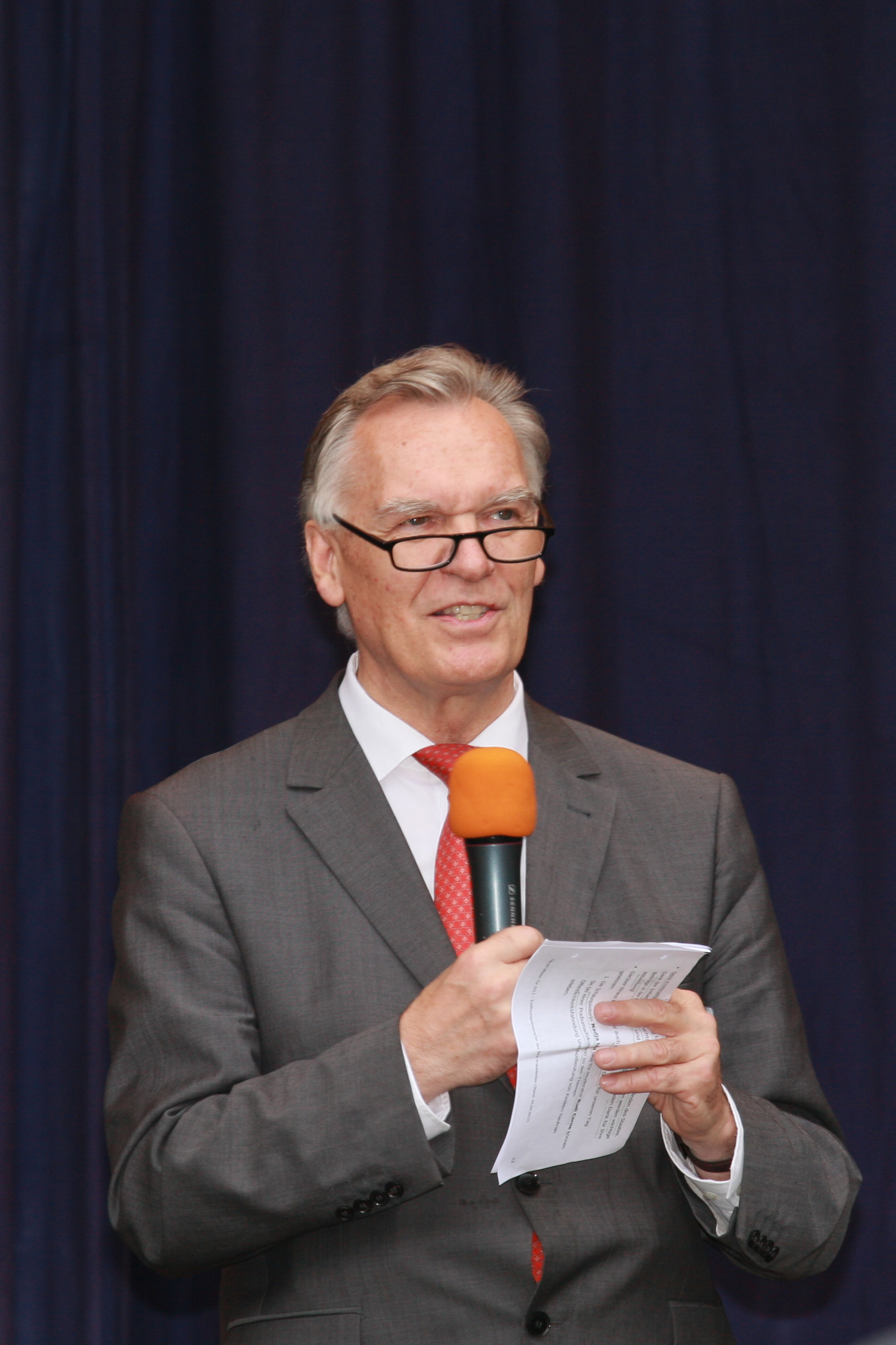
Jörg Ziercke (2013)

==== Chiefs of police ====
- Dr. Max Hagemann (1951–1952)
- Dr. Hanns Jess (1952–1955)
- Reinhard Dullien (1955–1964)
- Paul Dickopf (1965–1971)
- Horst Herold (1971 – March 1981)
- Heinrich Boge (March 1981 – 1990)
- Hans-Ludwig Zachert (1990 – April 1996)
- Klaus Ulrich Kersten (April 1996 – February 26, 2004)
- Jörg Ziercke (February 26, 2004 – December 2014)
- Holger Münch (since 1 December 2014)

==== Vice-chiefs of police ====
- Rolf Holle
- Werner Heinl
- Ernst Voss
- Günther Ermisch
- Reinhardt Rupprecht
- Herbert Tolksdorf (till 1983)
- Gerhard Boeden (1983 till 1987)
- Gerhard Köhler (1990 till 1993)
- Bernhard Falk (1993 till 2010)
- Rudolf Atzbach
- Jürgen Stock (von 2004 till 2014)
- Jürgen Maurer (2010 till März 2013)
- Peter Henzler (since April 2013)
- Michael Kretschmer (since March 2015)

== Equipment ==
=== IT ===
BKA uses a modified version of the Israeli spyware Pegasus. Pegasus gained notoriety because various totalitarian governments employed this commercial tool to spy on journalists and members of the opposition. The BKA and the Federal Intelligence Service (BND) began purchasing the software in 2020. According to government statements, however, it is intended for use only under strict legal conditions and exclusively in cases involving serious crime or terrorism.

=== Firearms ===
BKA police officers are equipped with the SIG Sauer P229 as a duty firearm. Selected units are also equipped with Heckler & Koch MP5 machine pistols. Additionally the police officers are equipped with pepperspray and bulletproof vests.

The special mission unit MEK is equipped with Glock pistols, Heckler & Koch MP5 and other weapons. The Protection Group is also allowed to carry additional military-grade weapons, e.g. the ASE unit or the protection details (only revolvers are allowed in certain foreign countries).

The use of these weapons and force in general is controlled by a special law, the UZwG.

BKA police officers are authorized to carry their duty firearms concealed while off-duty.

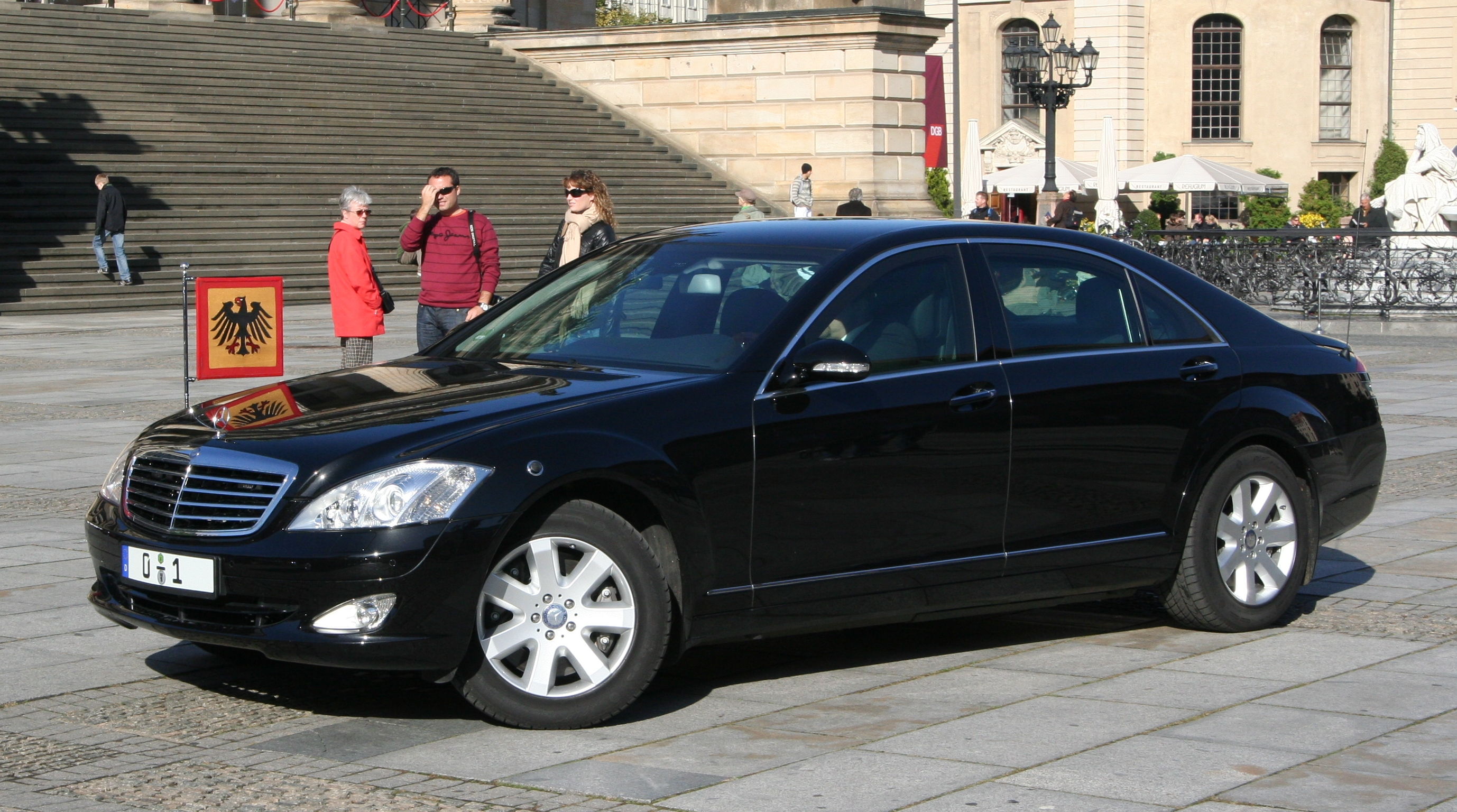
Armoured car of the BKA Protection Group, used for the President of Germany

=== Vehicles ===
The Protection Group of the BKA utilizes armoured cars from different manufacturers for their protection mission, e.g. like Mercedes-Benz W221 (for the President of Germany), Audi A8 L or BMW.

== Cases and investigations ==
- Red Army Faction
- 1998 Eschede train disaster (DVI-Team)
- 2004 Indian Ocean earthquake (DVI-Team)
- 2007 bomb plot in Germany (so called "Sauerland-Group")
- 2011 discovery of the National Socialist Underground murders and National Socialist Underground (NSU)
- 2016 Berlin truck attack
- Borussia Dortmund team bus bombing
- Project Medusa

== Images ==
BKA

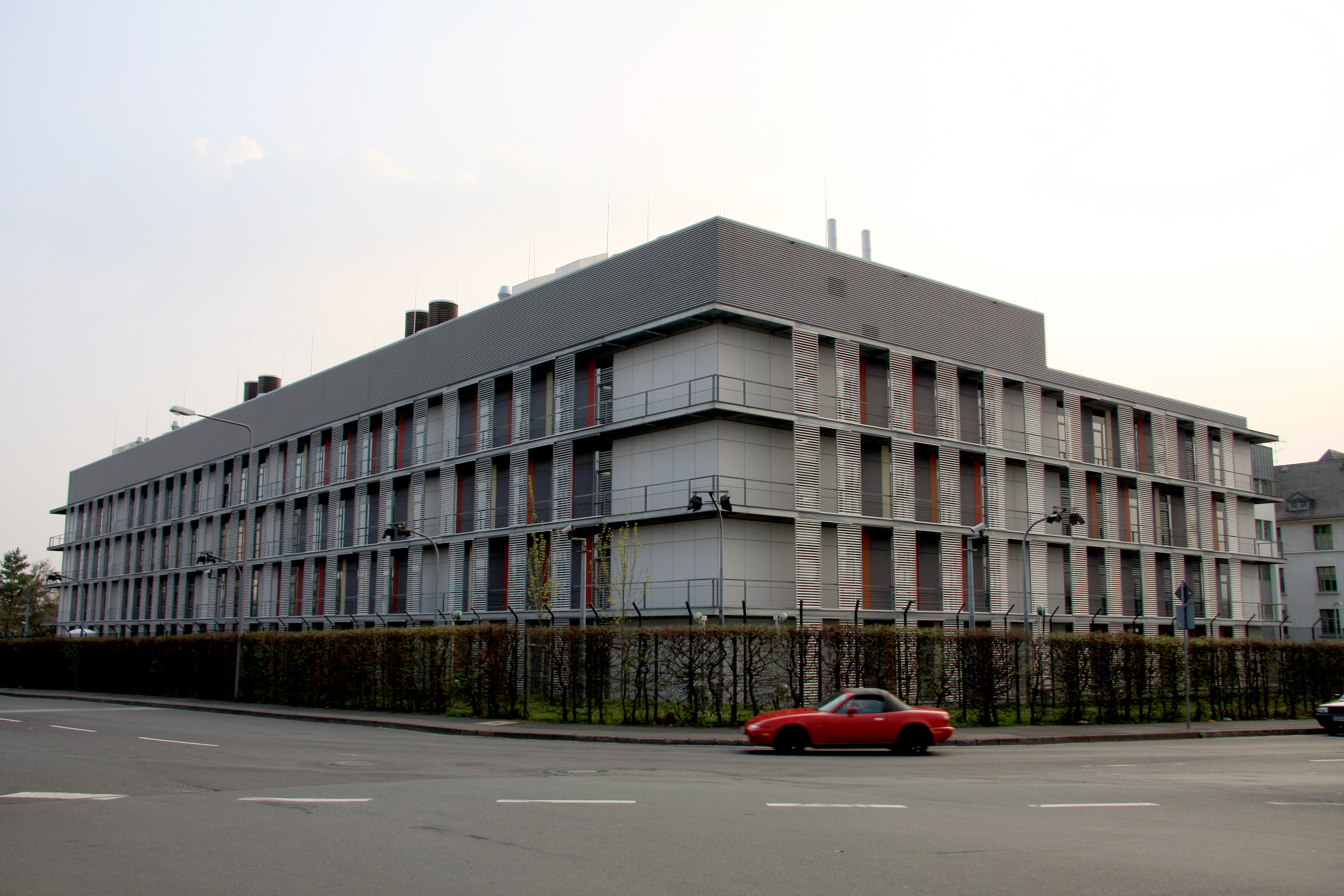
The BKA's Forensic Science Institute in Wiesbaden

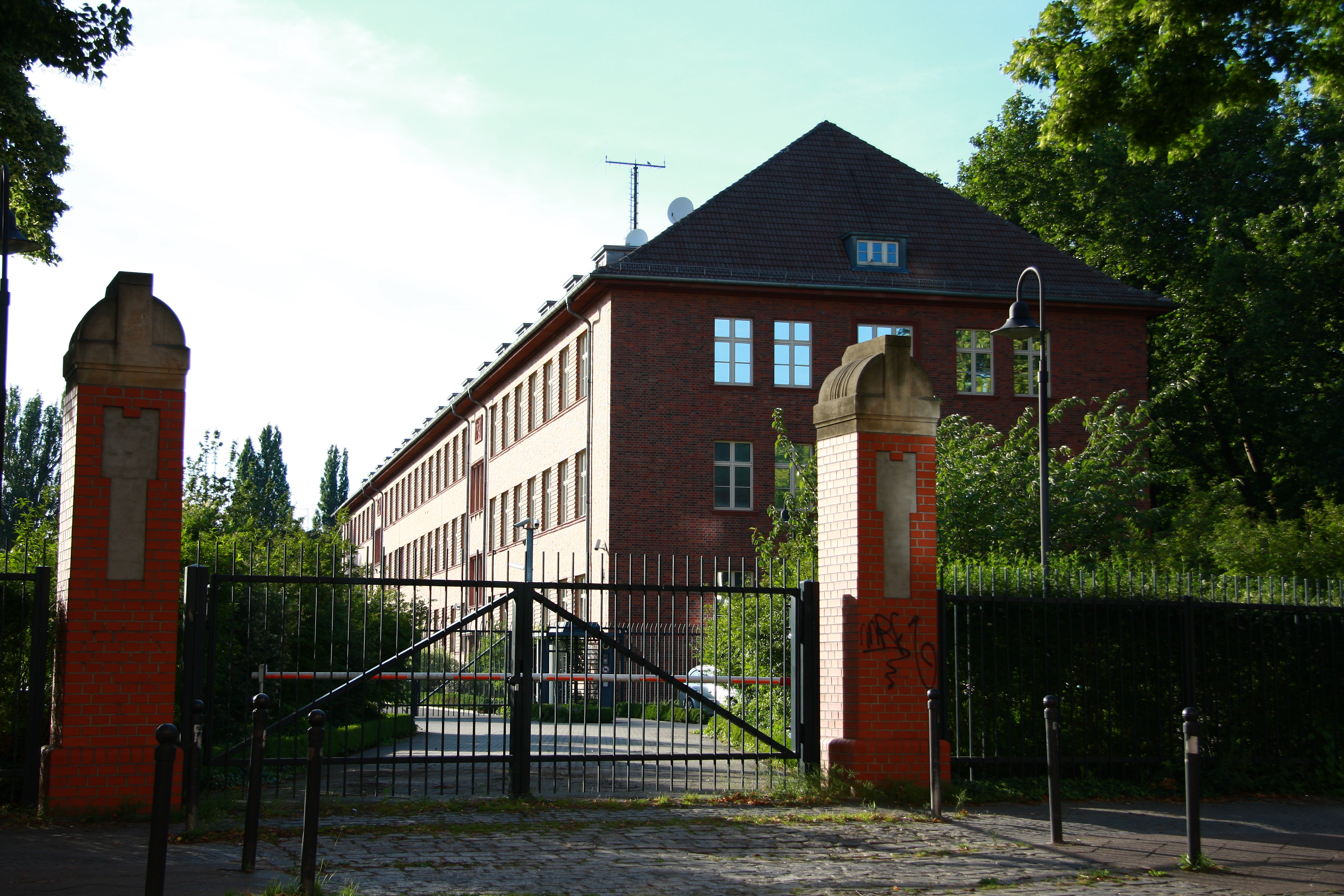
Station in Berlin including the joint counterterrorism center of Germany's security agencies

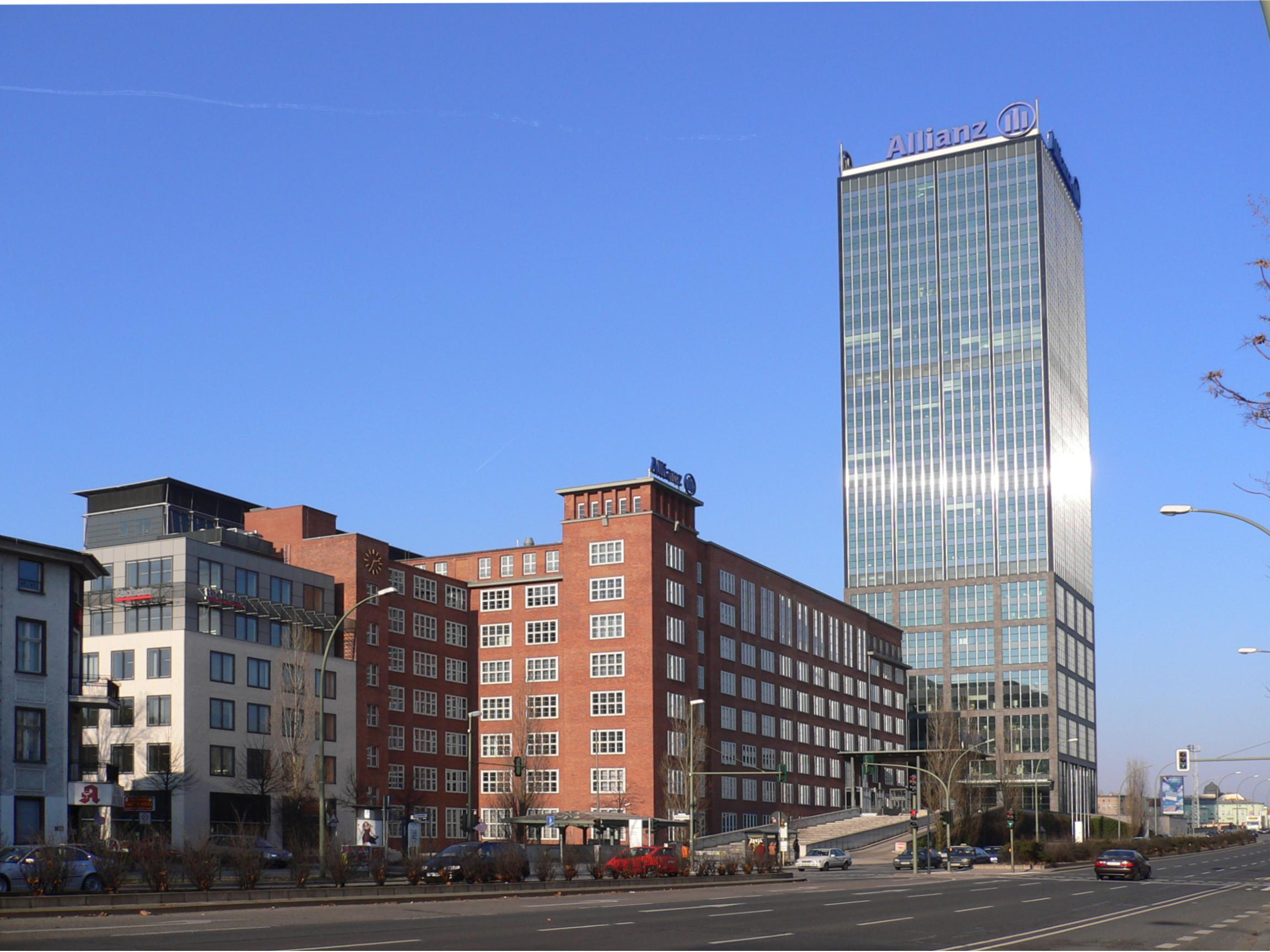
Treptowers in Berlin with offices of the BKA

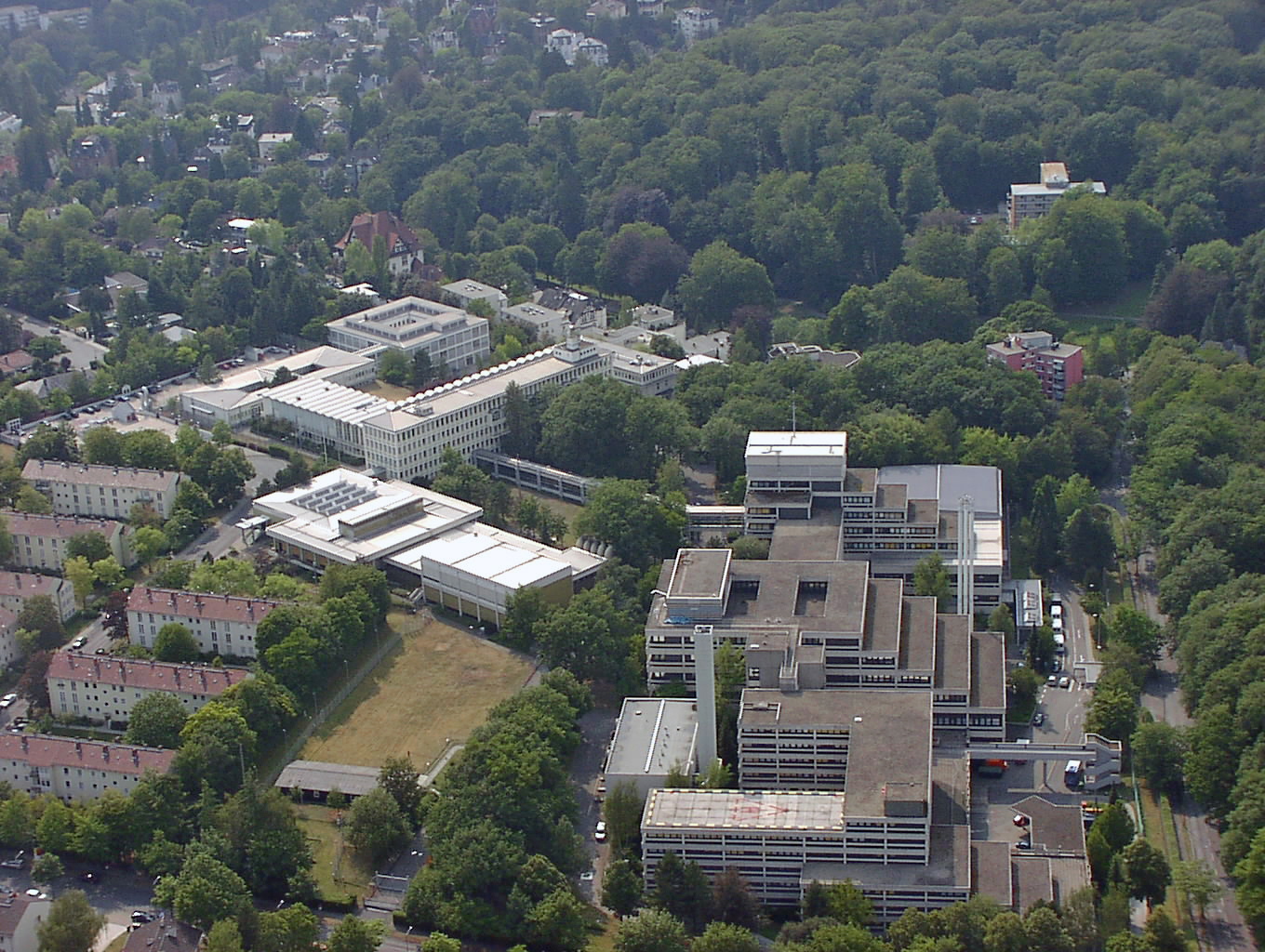
BKA Headquarters in Wiesbaden

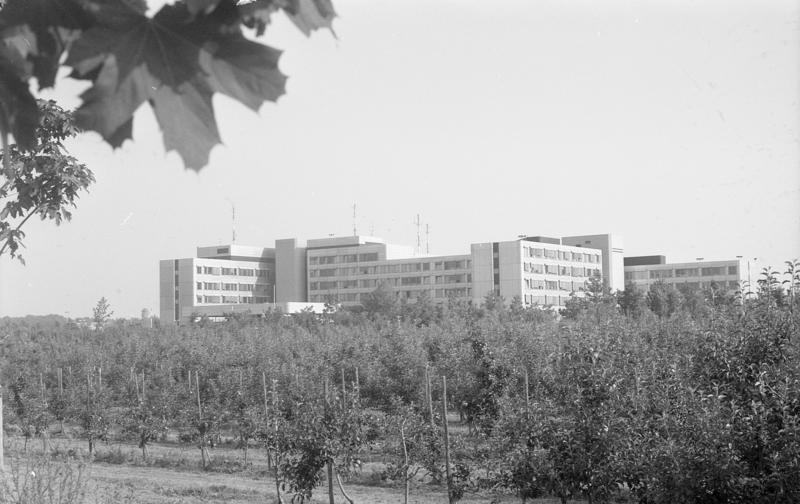
Station in Meckenheim, also called the UFO

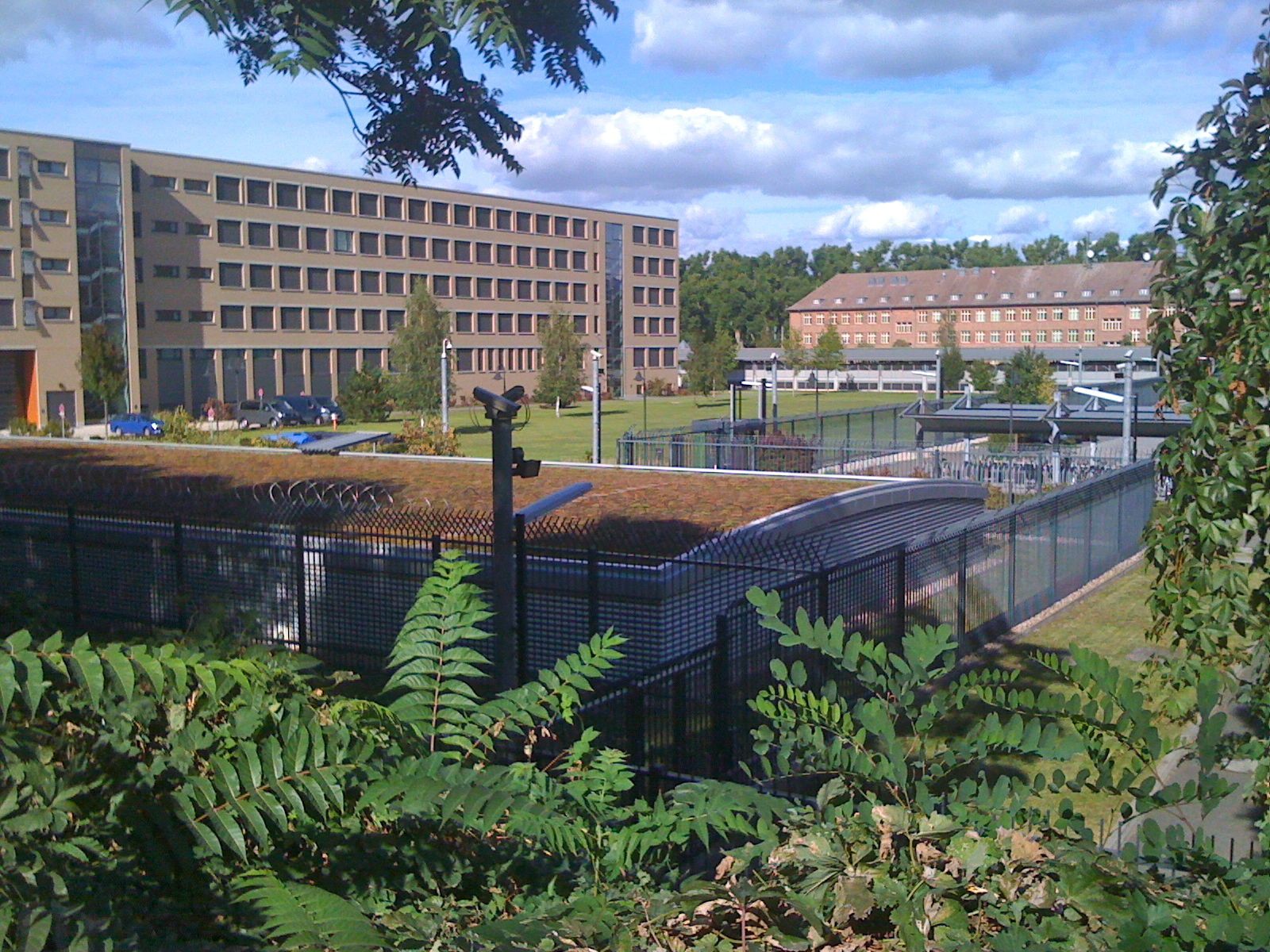
Berlin station of the BKA

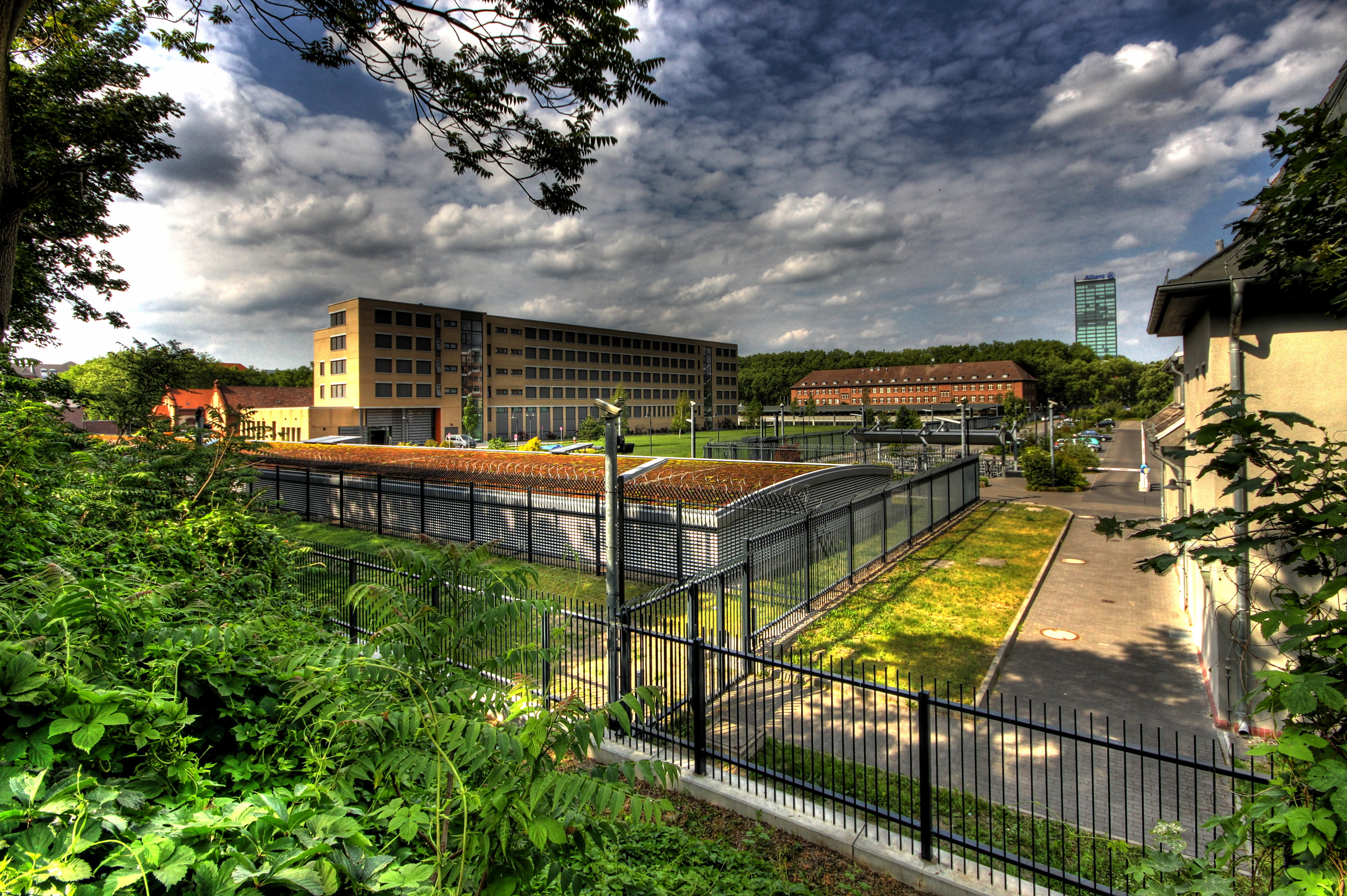
Berlin station of the BKA

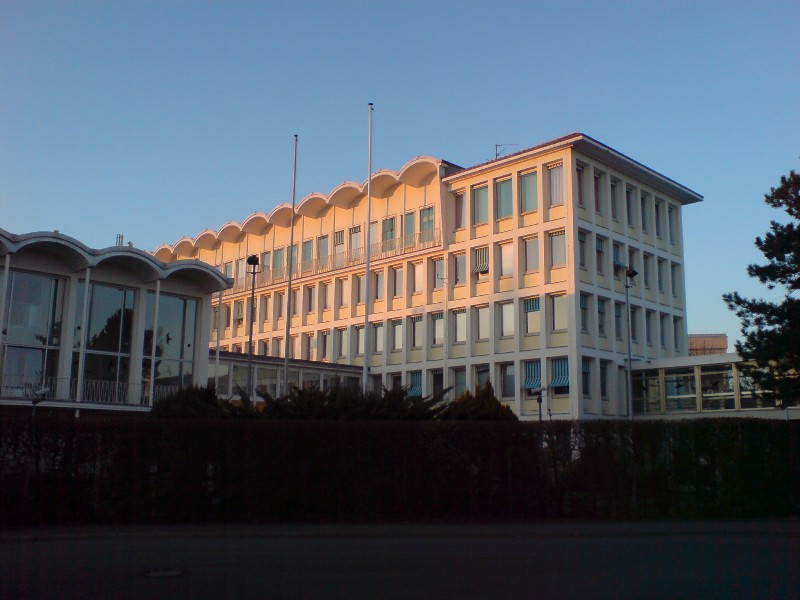
BKA HQ in Wiesbaden

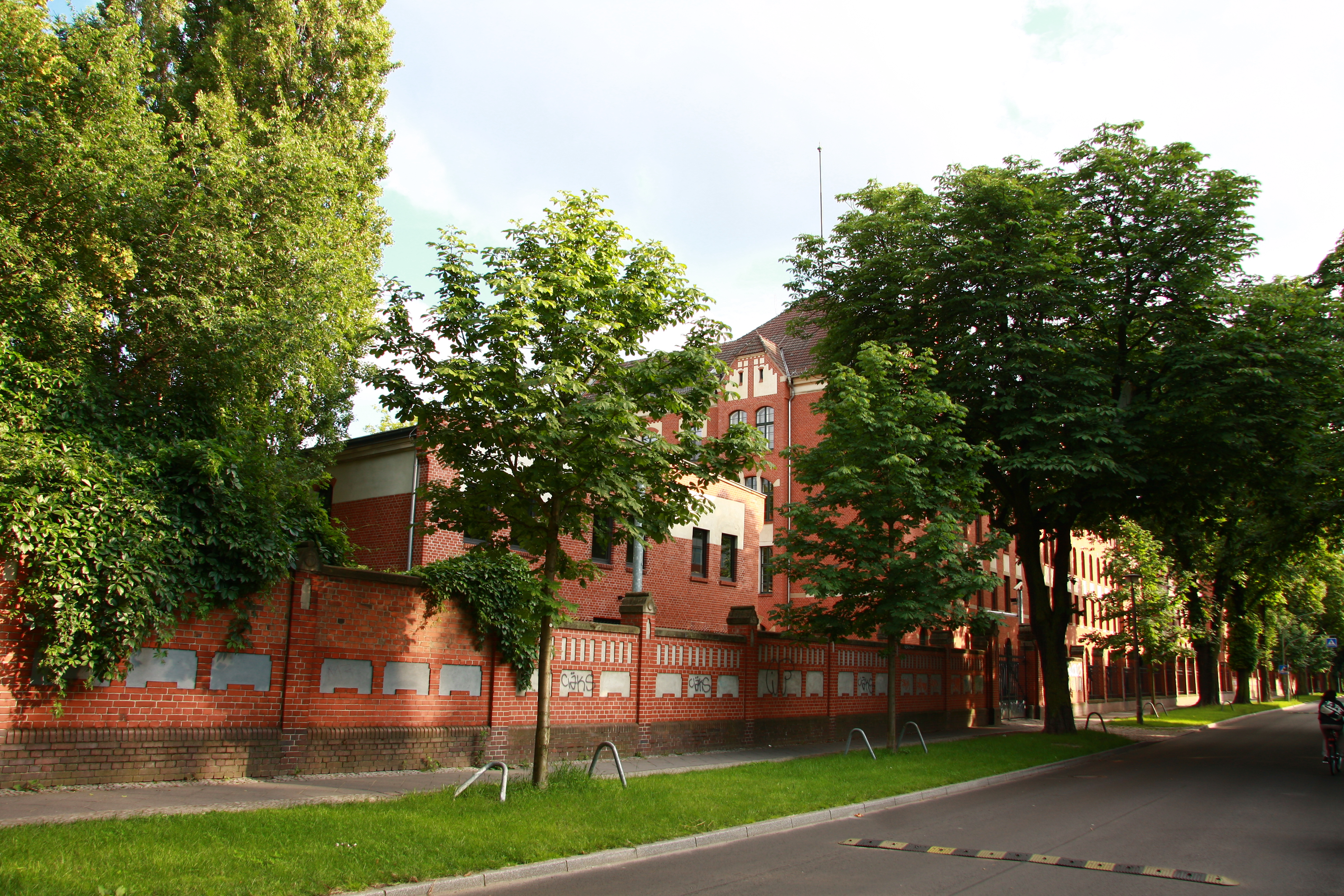

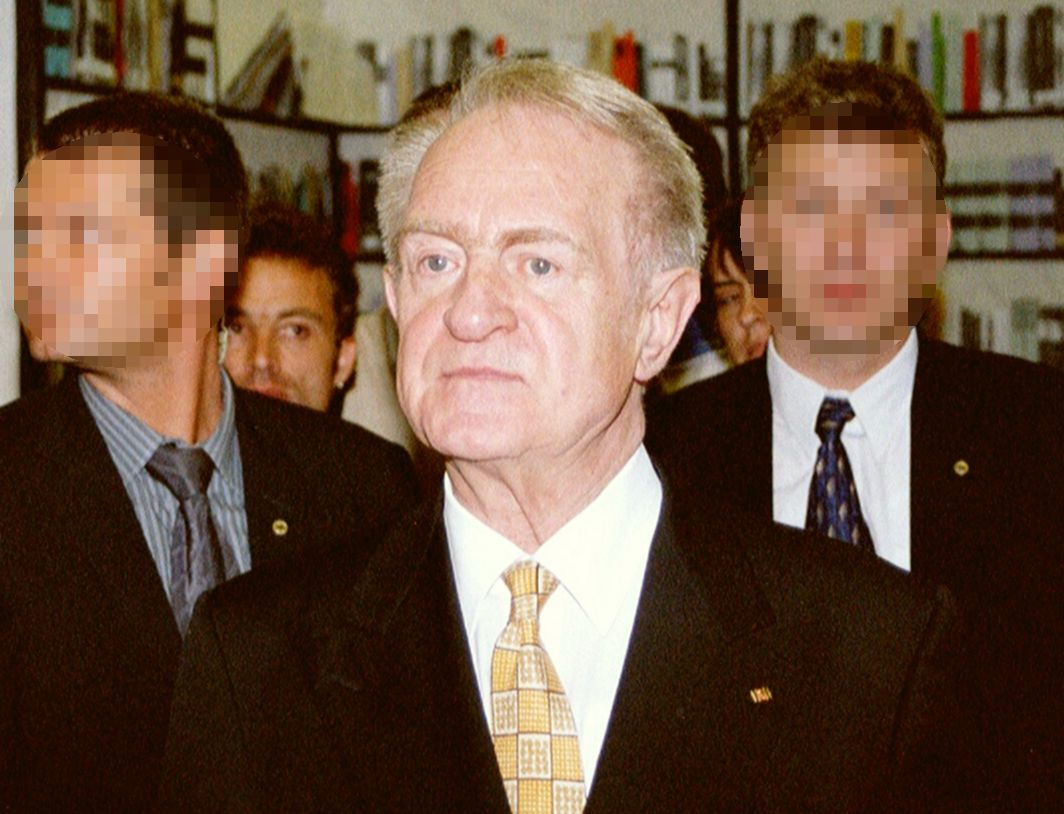
German President Rau with his Close Protection Detail

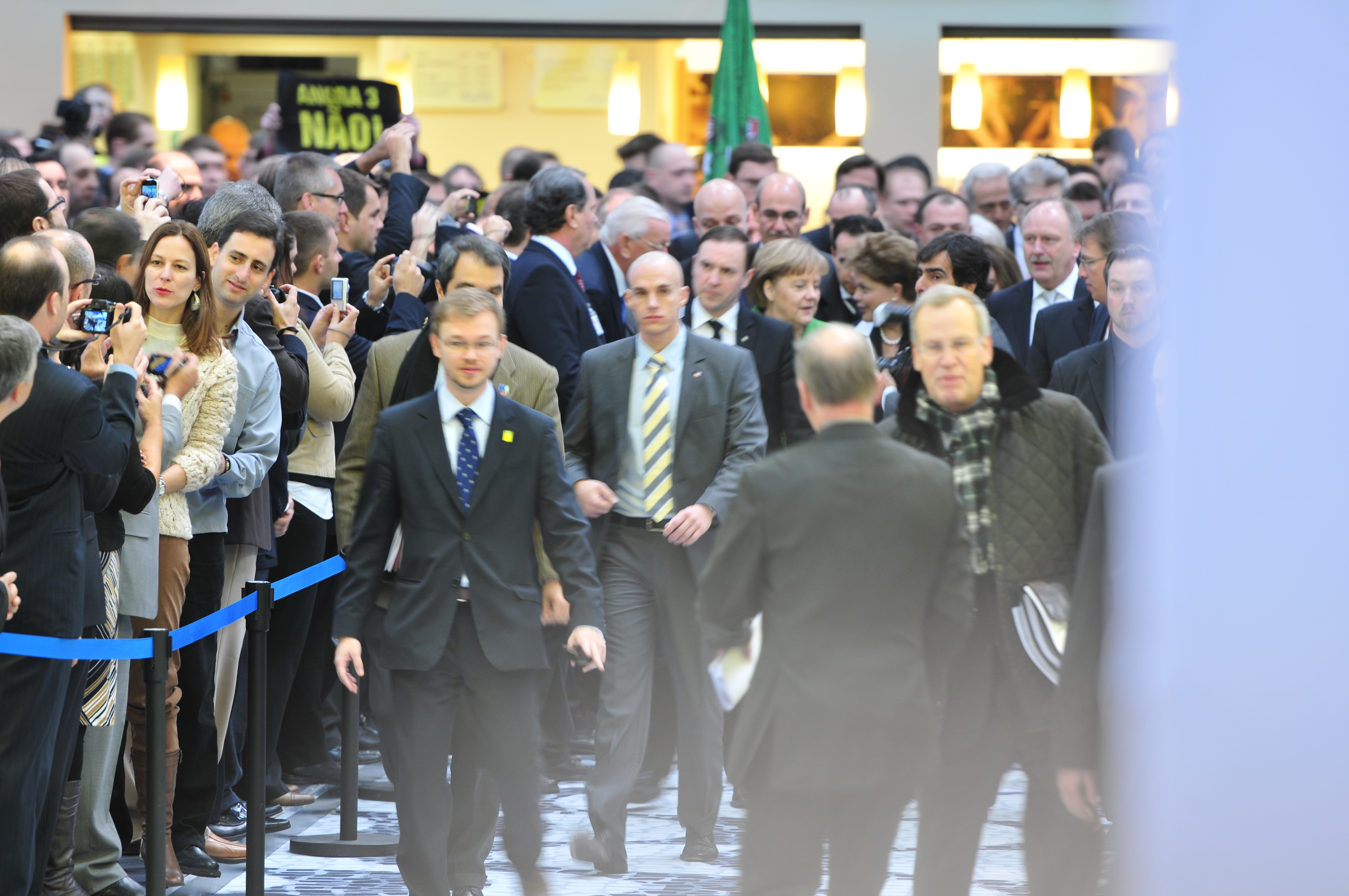
Angela Merkel with her Close Protection Detail

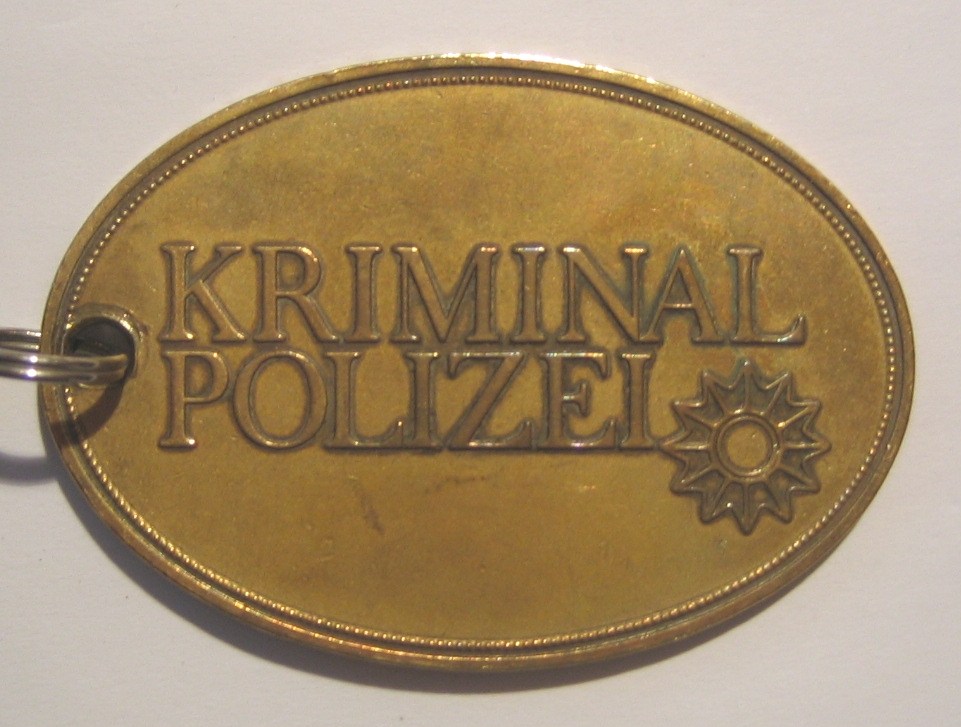
German criminal police badge

== See also ==
- Crime in Germany
- Federal Criminal Police Office of Austria
