= Landeskriminalamt =

State law enforcement agencies in Germany

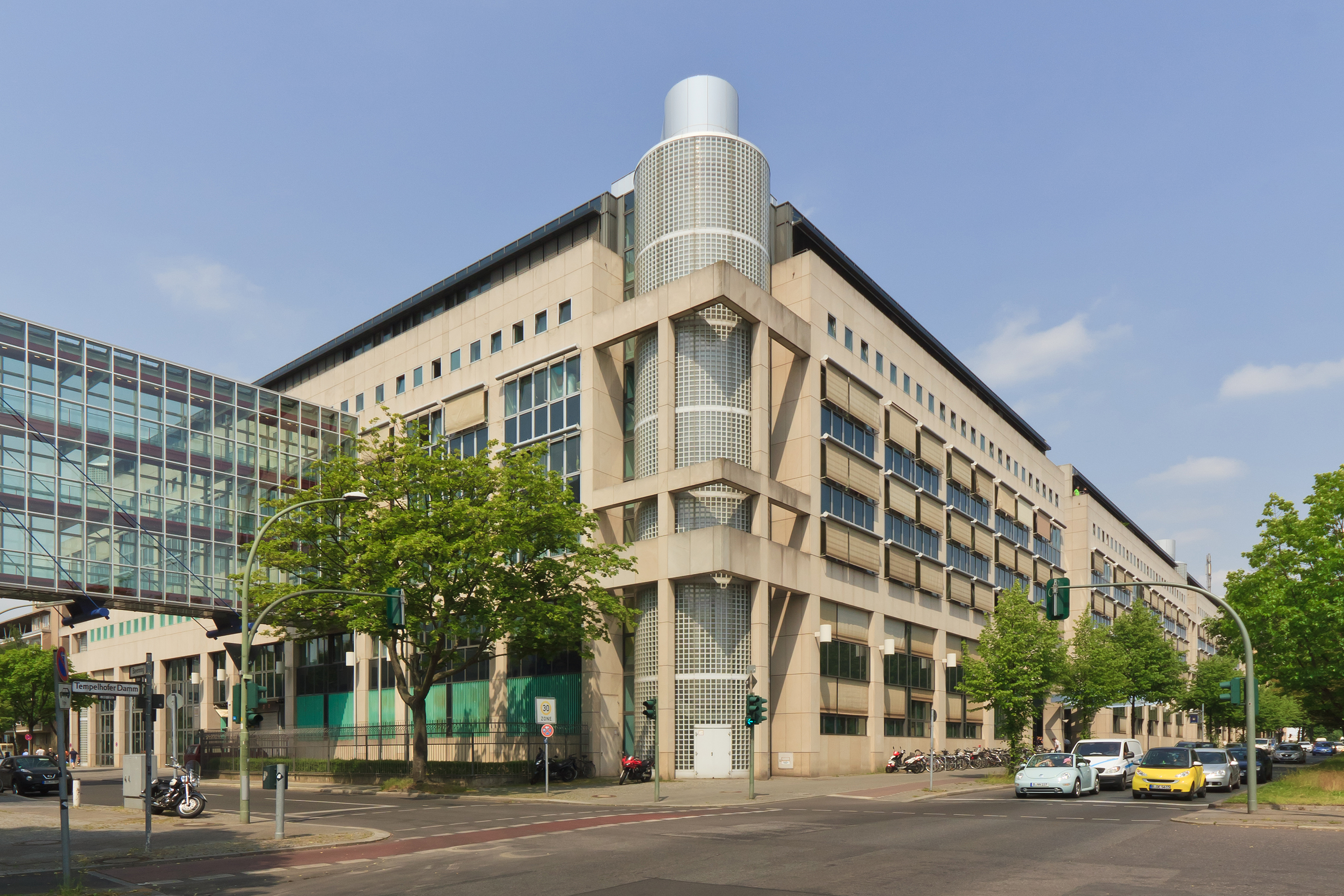
The LKA building in Berlin

The State Criminal Police Office, or Landeskriminalamt (German: [ˈlandəskʁimiˌnaːlʔamt] (LKA) pronounced [ɛlkaːʔˈaː]) in German, is an independent law enforcement agency in all 16 German states that is directly subordinate to the state's ministry of the interior.

== Missions ==
=== Investigations ===
LKAs supervise police operations aimed at preventing and investigating criminal offences, and coordinate investigations of serious crime involving more than one Präsidium (regional headquarters). They can take over investigative responsibility in cases of serious crime, e.g. drug trafficking, organized crime, environmental and white-collar crime or extremist and terrorist offences.

=== Crime analysis ===
Each Landeskriminalamt is also a modern central office for information, analyzing police intelligence from home and abroad and transmitting it to police stations. It collates data on criminal offences and offenders in crime statistics that are used as a basis for new strategies, policy decisions, and legislative initiatives. It also analyzes certain offense areas, evaluates the police measures executed in each case, forecasts expected tendencies, and describes events in annual reports.

=== Forensics ===
The LKA maintains forensic equipment for central examination of evidence using the latest scientific methods (e.g. DNA analysis, Automatic Fingerprint Identification System).

=== Special missions ===
LKAs also coordinate support for local police in hostage, kidnapping, and blackmail situations and provide experts in such cases, e.g., the SWAT team Spezialeinsatzkommando, the negotiation group or bomb disposal experts. It is also the central office for physical security technology and crime prevention, and coordinates state anti-drug programs.

== See also ==
- Crime in Germany
- State bureau of investigation
- Bundeskriminalamt
- Project Medusa
