= Dig Deeper: The Disappearance of Birgit Meier =

- Genre: True crime Documentary
- Country of origin: Germany
- Original language: German
- No. of seasons: 1
- No. of episodes: 4

Production
- Running time: 57–60 minutes

Original release
- Release: November 26, 2021

Dig Deeper: The Disappearance of Birgit Meier is a 2021 German true crime documentary miniseries, about the disappearance of Birgit Meier in 1989 and the investigation of it.

== Episodes ==
No.	Title	Directed by	Original release date
1	"Episode 1"	Nicolas Steiner	November 26, 2021
Soon after Brigit goes missing, questions arise over a possible connection to other recent crimes, but the investigation gets off to a rocky start.
2	"Episode 2"	Nicolas Steiner	November 26, 2021
Birgit's brother, Wolfgang, grows frustrated by the lax approach to the case, particularly as it pertains to a person of interest with a criminal past.
3	"Episode 3"	Nicolas Steiner	November 26, 2021
As Wolfgang and his associates delve deeper into Kurt-Werner Wichmann's life, they discover a pattern of dark, disturbing violence that spanned decades.
4	"Episode 4"	Nicolas Steiner	November 26, 2021
Despite discovering a key piece of evidence, the truth about Birgit's fate remains elusive, but Wolfgang and his team remain resolute in their pursuit.
