= German Autumn =

1977 West German murders, hostage crisis

- Part of the Cold War
| Date | 5 September – 18 October 1977 |
| Location | West Germany, Somalia, other countries |
| Result | West German victory |

Belligerents
| West Germany; Supported by: Somali Democratic Republic; United States | Red Army Faction; Revolutionary Cells; Popular Front for the Liberation of Palestine |

Commanders and leaders
| Helmut Schmidt; H.-J. Wischnewski; Ulrich Wegener | Andreas Baader (executed); Gudrun Ensslin (executed); Jan-Carl Raspe (executed); Zohair Y. Akache † |

Casualties and losses
| 6 dead | 7 dead, 1 injured |

The German Autumn (German: Deutscher Herbst) refers to the period and political atmosphere in the Federal Republic of Germany (West Germany) during September and October 1977. This period was marked by a series of attacks by the Red Army Faction (RAF), a far-left militant group designated as a terrorist organization by the West German government. The German Autumn included the kidnapping and murder of German industrialist and former SS officer Hanns Martin Schleyer, the hijacking of Lufthansa Flight 181, and the suicides of the imprisoned leading members of the first generation of the RAF. These events represented the final act of the RAF's so-called "Offensive 77". The German Autumn is considered one of the most serious crises in the history of the Federal Republic of Germany.

The term "German Autumn" is derived from the 1978 film Deutschland im Herbst (Germany in Autumn), a collage of several documentaries by eleven directors of the "New German Cinema." The film critically examines the state's reaction to terrorism from different perspectives.

== Events in the spring and summer of 1977 ==
In 1977, the activities of the so-called second generation of the RAF reached their peak. However, the events before September are generally not considered to be part of the German Autumn.

=== Siegfried Buback killing ===
On 7 April 1977, the Federal Prosecutor General Siegfried Buback, his driver Wolfgang Göbel, and the head of the Federal Prosecutor's Office's motor pool, Georg Wurster, were shot dead whilst travelling by car from Buback's home in Neureut to the Bundesgerichtshof in Karlsruhe. Their car was ambushed by the RAF's "Ulrike Meinhof Commando" (Kommando Ulrike Meinhof) from a motorcycle.

Four RAF members, Christian Klar, Knut Folkerts, Günter Sonnenberg and Brigitte Mohnhaupt were formally charged and prosecuted in connection with the Buback murder. In 2007, former RAF members Peter-Jürgen Boock and Verena Becker claimed that another former RAF member, Stefan Wisniewski, had fired the gun that killed Buback, Göbel and Wurster.

=== Jürgen Ponto killing ===
On 30 July 1977, Jürgen Ponto, the spokesman for the board of Dresdner Bank AG, was murdered in a failed kidnapping attempt. RAF member Susanne Albrecht, who knew Ponto personally, visited him accompanied by Brigitte Mohnhaupt and Christian Klar. Unaware of Albrecht's political radicalization, Ponto received her unsuspectingly at his private home on Oberhöchstadter Strasse in Oberursel. When Ponto resisted the kidnapping, Klar and Mohnhaupt shot him several times, fatally wounding him. The three then fled in the getaway car driven by Peter-Jürgen Boock, which was waiting in front of Pontos' villa.

On 25 August 1977, an attack on the Federal Prosecutor's Office building in Karlsruhe failed.

== Course of autumn 1977 ==
=== Hanns Martin Schleyer kidnapping ===
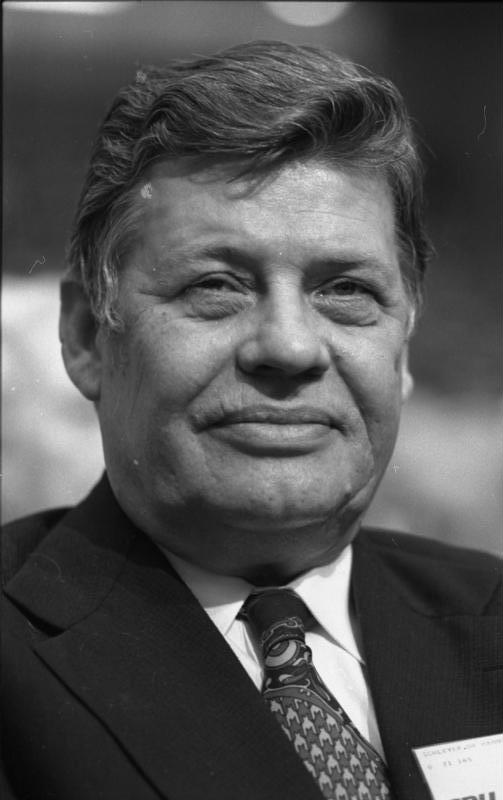
Hanns Martin Schleyer †

On 5 September 1977, Ex- SS Officer and former Nazi, then President of the Confederation of German Employers' Associations (Bundesvereinigung der Deutschen Arbeitgeberverbände, BDA) and the Federation of German Industries (Bundesverband der Deutschen Industrie, BDI), Hanns Martin Schleyer, was kidnapped in Cologne. His driver and three police officers were murdered. The kidnappers demanded the release of eleven imprisoned RAF terrorists.

=== Lufthansa Landshut hijacking ===
As the German government did not give in to the blackmail—unlike with the kidnapping of Peter Lorenz two years earlier—terrorists from the Popular Front for the Liberation of Palestine (PFLP), allied with the Red Army Faction (RAF), tried to increase the pressure by hijacking the Lufthansa plane Landshut on 13 October 1977. After an odyssey through the Middle East and the murder of the pilot, Captain Jürgen Schumann, the plane landed at Mogadishu International Airport, the capital of Somalia. Here, the Landshut was stormed by the West German counter-terrorism unit GSG 9 on 18 October at around 00:05 Central European Time (CET). Later that morning, a special report on Deutschlandfunk announced that "all hostages have been freed. We do not yet know whether there were any dead or injured among them..." All 87 hostages were rescued, including four of the five crew members. Three of the hijackers were killed and one hijacker was seriously wounded.

=== Night of death in Stammheim Prison ===
Shortly afterward, in the early morning hours of 18 October 1977, known as the "Night of death in Stammheim", RAF members Andreas Baader, Gudrun Ensslin, and Jan-Carl Raspe, who were imprisoned in Stuttgart-Stammheim supermax prison, reportedly took their own lives. Irmgard Möller, who was also imprisoned there, survived an alleged suicide attempt, sustaining multiple stab wounds to her chest. The kidnapped Hanns Martin Schleyer was subsequently murdered by his captors. His body was found on the evening of 19 October in the trunk of a green Audi 100 GL, parked on a side street in Mulhouse, Alsace, France, close to the German and Swiss border.

== Political reaction ==
=== Political divides ===
During the German Autumn, West German political parties engaged in heated arguments. The opposition, comprising the center-right Christian Democratic Union of Germany (CDU) and the Christian Social Union (CSU), suspected that the ruling social-liberal coalition of the Social Democratic Party (SPD) and the Free Democratic Party (FDP) under Federal Chancellor Helmut Schmidt (SPD) was ideologically close to the terrorists. In response, the coalition accused the opposition of hysterical overreactions and of attempting to transform the Federal Republic of Germany (West Germany) into a police state.

=== Policy agreements ===
Despite these differences, at the beginning of the Schleyer kidnapping, Chancellor Schmidt convened the so-called Great Crisis Committee (Großer Krisenstab), which included members of all parliamentary groups in the West German Bundestag. Historian Wolfgang Kraushaar later described this period as an "undeclared state of emergency" (state of exception). One result of the cross-party consensus was the "Contact Ban Act" (Kontaktsperre) passed in the autumn of 1977, which allowed for a contact ban for prisoners, including discussions with lawyers. SPD politician and lawyer Hubert Weber welcomed this act, stating that "The Federal Republic is not in a state of emergency," and thus it was wrong for the courts to strain the legal definition of an emergency. Additionally, the Code of Criminal Procedure (Strafprozessordnung) was amended to limit defendants to appoint a maximum of three defense attorneys.

== See also ==
- Years of lead (Italy)
- Hot Summer of 1975 (Portugal)
