= Silke Maier-Witt =

German member of the Red Army Faction

Silke Maier-Witt (born 21 January 1950) is a German former member of the Red Army Faction who later became a trauma psychologist and welfare organiser. During 2000 she was recruited to work in Kosovo by Germany's Civil Peace Service in the aftermath of the Kosovo War. She subsequently settled in North Macedonia.

She is most notable for her role as a member of the Red Army Faction. She was involved in the kidnapping and murder of Hanns-Martin Schleyer. On 17 October 1977 it was Silke Maier-Witt who sent a letter to the left-leaning Paris newspaper Libération announcing that after 43 days [of captivity] the terrorists had "ended the miserable and corrupt existence of Hanns-Martin Schleyer". "Mr. Schmidt" (the Federal Chancellor), was invited to collect the body of the former hostage from the boot a green Audi 100 with a Bad Homburg license plate that had been left parked in the Rue Charles Peguy in Mulhouse. The letter, which she followed up with a telephone call from Frankfurt (Main) station delivering the same message on 19 October 1977, also hinted strongly at a connection between the Schleyer killing and the "massacres in Mogadishu and Stammheim". (Note: "Wir haben nach 43 Tagen Hanns-Martin Schleyers klägliche und korrupte Existenz beendet. Herr Schmidt, der in seinem Machtkalkül von Anfang an mit Schleyers Tod spekulierte, kann ihn in der Rue Charles Peguy in Mülhausen in einem grünen Audi 100 mit Bad Homburger Kennzeichen abholen. Für unseren Schmerz und unsere Wut über die Massaker in Mogadischu und Stammheim ist sein Tod bedeutungslos.")

Maier-Witt evaded the West German police until 1980, when she was slipped across to the German Democratic Republic (via Prague) with help from the East German homeland security services (Stasi), and became one of ten former RAF activists who lived hidden across the "internal German border" under a succession of false identities created for them by the East German Ministry of State Security. However, during the months of change that followed the breaching of the Berlin Wall in 1989, the Ministry of State Security was dissolved: suddenly East and West German police services began to work together. During the summer of 1990 the ten RAF fugitives were unmasked. Maier-Witt was arrested on 18 June. In 1991 the high court in Stuttgart sentenced her to ten years' imprisonment, having convicted her on various charges that included participation in the murder of BDA president Hanns Martin Schleyer. She was conditionally released for good behaviour on 16 June 1995, but the "terrorist" label and accompanying psychological baggage were not so easy to shake off.

== Life ==
=== Family background ===
Silke Maier-Witt was born in Nagold in the Black Forest, near Stuttgart, the younger of her parents' two daughters. In 1956, when she was six, her mother died of cancer. Her father remarried within a year and took his family north to live in Hamburg, where she lived first with her grandmother and later with an aunt. In 1959 her father took a third wife but her relationship to her latest stepmother was never a relaxed one. Her father had qualified as a shipbuilding engineer. When she was 12 she and her sister investigated the attic where they found a box containing some of her father's mementos: these included clear evidence that the girls' father had belonged to the SS, a paramilitary organisation close to the heart of the Nazi Party. At the time she understood little of what that meant. Four years later, having learned about the Holocaust, she asked her father about the millions of Jews killed in the concentration camps: he reacted aggressively and refused to discuss the matter, so she ignored him for the next two months. Maier-Witt remains haunted by the memory of her father's reaction. It was only several decades later, long after her father had died, that she pieced together the elements she had discovered and completed for herself a deeply disturbing appreciation of what must have been her father's wartime involvements.

=== Education ===
In 1960 she enrolled at the "Heilwig Gymnasium" (secondary school) in Hamburg. This is where she was later taught about the Holocaust. She moved on to the University of Hamburg in 1969 at a time when the spirit of '68 was still very much alive. "Repressive" domestic legislation and escalating US involvement in the Vietnam War were feeding a student agenda of political resistance. Maier-Witt studied Medicine and Psychology. Her studies included work on dysfunctional adolescent behaviour. From 1973 she was sharing a Hamburg apartment with Susanne Albrecht and Sigrid Sternebeck. Among their radicalised student comrades they became known at this time as the three "Hamburg aunties". Outside the lecture halls Maier-Witt joined in demonstrations against the Vietnam war with the others. They also demonstrated in support of better conditions for imprisoned members of the Baader–Meinhof Group which had emerged as a militant left-wing faction from the German student movement, and which was by now becoming known as the "Red Army Faction" (RAF). For Maier-Witt, a turning point was the death in November 1974 of Holger Meins, almost certainly as a result of a hunger strike in pursuit of improved prison conditions. Many of her friends were sympathetic to the RAF and some were members of it; so she was predisposed to react strongly over the death. "Meins had risked his life while I was holidaying in Greece. That felt very wrong", she told an interviewer much later. She joined the "committee against torture" and supported the prisoners. "I could not think of anything else, and gave up my studies". When she was 26 she became pregnant. The father was another left-wing activist. Having a baby was not part of the fight for "the cause" in which they were all engaged and she had an abortion. (Note: "Ein Kind, das kam im Kampf für ‚die Sache' einfach nicht vor.")

=== Red Army Faction ===
In a variation of the infamous "he who is not for us is against us" mantra, Andreas Baader, the RAF founder had issued his "human or swine?" challenge. Maier-Witt, who much later completed her psychological studies, recalled in 2002 that as a confused student drop-out lacking in self-confidence, she was desperately vulnerable to a slogan offering this type of binary choice. She certainly did not wish to be thought a bourgeois swine from a small-town Black Forest environment. She began to undertake missions for the RAF, travelling across Europe providing "courier services" for her comrades. What amounted to her formal recruitment took place in an apartment in Amsterdam on 7 April 1977, just a few hours after the killing in Karlsruhe of Public Prosecutor Siegfried Buback. Jürgen Boock handed over a Colt pistol to the new recruit. It was both a crossing into illegality and the "passport to a new identity". Looking back on that moment she resists the temptation to blame anyone else: "No one talked me into it, I came across of my own accord. Of course I knew we were criminals ... I could not step back, wanted to belong, there was no alternative. I have always been quicker to say 'yes' than 'no'. ... Till now [in 2002] I still cannot understand that decision". Later she would identify a parallel between her own actions in joining the RAF and her father's motives when, aged just 19, he joined the "SS". The overwhelming urge to be part of something larger than oneself was something that she and her father, at least when young adults, seemed to have shared.

=== Hanns-Martin Schleyer ===
RAF members used cover names, just as members of the (at the time, and again in West Germany after 1953, illegal) German Communist Party had done during (and before) the Hitler years. Silke Maier-Witt chose the cover name "Sonja", a name popular in the Soviet Union where it also identifies the Dormouse. Although she accepts "collective guilt" for the murders committed by the group, she asserts that she never personally killed anyone, and indeed after two and a half years, troubled by a conflicted conscience, she handed back her gun. Her contribution was more logistical, as part of a support group. She would rent cars, gather intelligence and scope out locations. She would use the rented cars to take guns across borders or simply to carry messages that were unsuitable for safe transmission through the public telephone or mail services. She was trained in the art of forging passport stamps. As regards the kidnapping and murder of Hanns-Martin Schleyer, her role is described in various sources as that of a "Späherin" (loosely, "scout" or "look-out"). Also, after the kidnapping it was Maier-Witt who typed up the transcriptions from the lengthy tapes of interrogation sessions that her comrades had conducted with Schleyer.

According to one estimate RAF terrorism killed 33 people and injured around 200, but it was the kidnap and murder of Hanns-Martin Schleyer that most grabbed the headlines, both at the time and subsequently. A poster showing the faces of 16 "urgently sought terrorists" was widely distributed. Shortly after the killing she found herself sitting having her hair cut with her face on a "wanted" poster looking out at her, hanging in front of the hairdresser's mirror. Whether because of her "terrorist training" or a natural ability to go unnoticed, she nevertheless this time avoided being spotted.

In 1978 her father suffered a heart attack and died. Maier-Witt was by now keen to avoid arrest and estranged from her family. She did not re-establish contact with her stepmother and siblings to attend the funeral.

=== Zürich bank raid ===
Funding was a constant preoccupation for the RAF. One solution was bank raids. On 18 November 1979, as a gang of RAF bank robbers fled after a bank robbery in Zürich, three of them, including Christian Klar, opened fire at a pursuing policeman. A ricocheting bullet hit a passer-by looking at the displays in the window of a fashion store. The woman later died. (Maier-Witt would find out only in 1990 that she had been Jewish.) Silke Maier-Witt had been involved in planning the Zürich bank raid. A part of her consciousness that had been closed off since the killing of Hanns-Martin Schleyer suddenly clicked open. The woman had died not because of some high political objective, but simply as part of a funding operation so that the RAF could carry on renting apartments, pay for food and car-hire. It was now that she, and several comrades, handed back their weapons after taking the decision to quit active involvement and to disappear. With several others she took a trip to Paris, and from there they moved on to Prague, out of reach of western law enforcement agencies.

=== Retirement from active RAF participation ===
During the later 1970s, the tactics of the RAF became more extreme, and the idealism that had motivated its members earlier in the decade was becoming harder to sustain. By the end of 1979, Silke Maier-Witt was one of eight "drop out" RAF members who no longer wished to participate in the group's violent activities. The police had become more determined to catch them. The "wanted" posters were harder to avoid, and successful bank raids became impossible. Endless discussions took place over what to do about so-called drop-outs, whose recruitment the leaders were now inclined to view as "mistakes". There seems to have been no willingness from anyone for the drop-outs to simply "hand themselves in", and no appetite for simply identifying them as security risks and shooting them. The RAF managed to transfer their retirees abroad, however, albeit without credible identity papers, first to Paris and from there to Prague. From Prague, there was talk of transferring to safety in "Black Africa", where several Marxist governments would, it was assumed, view the ex-terrorists with sympathy. Expecting to settle in Angola or Mozambique, Maier-Witt was one of several who started to study Portuguese as they waited in Prague.

Resettling eight former terrorist accomplices at the far end of Africa was not a task for which the RAF was equipped. They needed expert assistance. Not for the first time (as it later turned out), they turned to contacts in the East German Ministry for state security ("Stasi"). Inge Viett, who had joined the RAF as a result of a merger with the 2 June [West German terrorist] Movement, had already conducted exploratory discussions on the possibilities with her contact, Stasi officer Colonel Harry Dahl. His reaction, when asked for help exporting the retirees to southern Africa, was cautious but positive: "Well, eight people, that's not so simple. But we shall see. Solidarity [between Marxist comrades] is indeed our first duty". (Note: "Sooo ... acht Leute, ist ja kein Pappenstiel. Na, da wollen wir mal sehen. Solidarität ist ja unsere erste Pflicht.") The next day, he came back with a question: "Did you not think of delivering the de-mobilised fighters to us?" (Note: "Habt ihr nicht mal daran gedacht, die demobilisierten Kämpfer zu uns zu bringen?") The Stasi expressed concern that hiding the "de-mobilised fighters" in Angola or Mozambique was impractical on many levels, including the issues of language and skin colour. There was also a concern that the RAF "drop outs" might disclose what they knew about links between the East German security services and the West German terrorist groups. Instead, at the start of September 1980, the eight were invited to relocate to East Germany where they were issued with new identities and coached until they had mastered their cover stories, before being distributed across the remoter corners of East Germany and permitted to start new lives, albeit under surveillance, and without being permitted to contact one another.

=== Welcome to the German Democratic Republic ===
In East Germany, the Stasi installed their RAF guests in a lakeside "summer camp" in the Briesen Woods ("Forst Brisen"). They were the only guests and the compound was fenced off inside a "militarily restricted No-go-Area". Maier-Witt told her hosts that she had come to the German Democratic Republic because she rejected the "imperialist state" and wanted to participate in the "struggle for peace and the building of socialism". She probably meant it: she appears to have found it relatively easy to settle down in East Germany. The new arrivals were issued with new names, new identity documents, and meticulously concocted back-stories covering everything from education and work histories to marriage histories which could be used to explain why they were to be living alone and without any living relatives in the area. They received intensive training about how to fit in: You did not visit the "Supermarket" but the "Kaufhalle" to buy your groceries. East German language conventions might incorporate a few words of Russian, but recently minted terms from the capitalist west were not widely encountered. In this and other ways, the languages of East and West Germany had diverged since the separate states were formally launched in 1949. From the summer camp, the Westerners were dispersed to their new homes with new identities and back stories.

Maier-Witt was allowed to choose her own name. The Stasi helped her to relaunch herself as "Angelika Gerlach" in Hoyerswerda, a small manufacturing town, for most purposes well off the beaten track, south of Cottbus and east of Dresden. It was as "Angelika Gerlach" that on 1 September 1980 she submitted her application for East German citizenship. Soon afterwards, she applied successfully for party membership. 20 Stasi "informal co-workers" were tasked with looking after the eight former RAF operatives as a full-time assignment so that the authorities would be confident that their guests were integrating satisfactorily into East German society.

Despite the care taken over preparing her for her new life, Silke-Maier Witt herself later recalled one incident early on during her time in the little town which demonstrated that even the Stasi had not thought of everything. She visited a local bank and asked to exchange her West German Deutschmarks for East German Ostmarks at a 1:1 exchange rate. Travel beyond the Inner German border was a rare privilege for East German comrades, and anyone who had somehow ended up with a Western currency to spare would normally have exchanged it (illegally) on the street rather than putting up with the official exchange rates offered in the banks: the bank workers looked at her as though they had seen a ghost. The episode was one who could easily encourage the "wrong" sort of interest among the townsfolk, although after more than two decades of one-party dictatorship, most East Germans had learned not to be too outspoken with any questions. At the end of 1983, she had to be withdrawn from Hoyerswerda on account of unspecified "security concerns". One source indicates that in a small town such as Hoyerswerda, she was more likely to get caught up in personal conversation with nosey neighbours which gave rise to a heightened risk of her true identity being inadvertently suspected or disclosed. and "Angelika Gerlach" from Hoyersweda moved into a newly built apartment near the Moskauer Platz in Erfurt.

It was presumably a reflection on Maier-Witt's unfinished medical studies in Hamburg that "Angelika Gerlach's" back story also included time as a trainee physician who had never qualified. Apparently, she struggled to lose her Western accent which led her to regularly needing to explain that she had relocated to the German Democratic Republic from "West Germany" out of political conviction. She would later recall: "Hardly anyone believed me!" She became a trainee nurse in a local hospital. The hospital work lasted until 1985, which indicates that the work may not have been full-time, since for some or all of the time between 1980 and 1985 she was also studying. Maier-Witt was positioned well down in the hospital hierarchy, and one of her jobs involved washing the bodies of people who had recently died. She told one interviewer that the task provided her with an "almost spiritual atonement".

After the enforced relocation to Erfurt, she was able to study information technology at the nearby Ilmenau Technical College. During this period, "Angelika Gerlach" also studied at the Fachhochschule Walter Krämer in Weimar and successfully completed her nursing exams at the medical faculty in Erfurt.

=== The end of "Angelika Gerlach" ===
On 20 March 1986, the Ministry for State Security received information from the vast KGB "Residentur" (establishment) in Berlin-Karlshorst that the "authorities in West Germany" had received "anonymous information according to which the wanted terrorist Silke Maier-Witt appeared to be identical with an East German citizen who had studied at Fachhochschule Walter Krämer in Weimar and completed exams at the medical faculty in Erfurt". The "red hot tip-off" had actually been received nine months earlier by the West German intelligence, probably from an East German escapee. The informant had studied with "Ms. Gerlach" at the Fachhochschule Walter Krämer in Weimar. He been astonished, on reaching the West, to see his fellow student looking out at him from "wanted" posters on public noticeboards. It is not immediately clear how the KGB got hold of the information. Researchers at the Stasi Records Agency suggest that the most likely explanation would be that it came from an unidentified Soviet mole working inside German intelligence. Meanwhile, in West Germany the intelligence services had reacted cautiously to the unexpected news of former RAF operatives apparently living under a new identity in East Germany. Completely independently of the "Angelika Gerlach" matter, two other cases of RAF retirees living hidden in East Germany had come to their notice at about the same time. (The East German authorities had hitherto been remarkably successful, for more than a decade, in keeping their contacts with the RAF hidden from their West German counterparts.) Delays in the West seem to have been exacerbated by mutual suspicions and rivalries between the Wiesbaden-based Federal (i.e. national) Police Service ("Bundeskriminalamt") and the Federal Intelligence Service ("Bundesnachrichtendienst") (based at that time in Bonn). A series of police enquiries were launched using the informal channels that by the mid-1980s were starting to exist between officials from West and East Germany. After countless meetings, West German officials formed the conclusion that "an official application to the East German authorities" in respect of the matter was not likely to lead to any helpful outcome. From the Stasi perspective, however, by the middle of 1986, there could no longer be any doubt that "Angelika Gerlach" would have to disappear.

Once that decision had been taken, "Angelika Gerlach" was hastily moved, initially to Cottbus and then to a Stasi apartment in Berlin-Prenzlauer Berg, where work commenced on a new identity for her. Her sudden disappearance from Erfurt was explained by a slightly vague story involving a rather complicated fictitious love affair in Cottbus. Systematically, all trace of "Angelika Gerlach" was scrubbed from the records at the college where she had been studying and from the local police residency records. "Gerlach" herself, working with Gerd Zaumseil, her principal Stasi minder ("Führungsoffizier"), cleared the apartment, taking care, once it was empty, to clean every surface thoroughly so that no residual finger prints could ever be found. It was virtually the same procedure that six years earlier she would have undertaken when cleaning out an apartment that RAF terrorists had been using to hide a hostage in or to prepare for a bank raid. A few days later she booked a holiday, handed in her notice at work, and disappeared. Leaving the (still almost new) apartment empty might have opened up avoidable risks, so a trusted "informal co-worker" was found by the State Security Ministry to take over the tenancy.

Faced with the failure of their attempts to pursue the reports they had received of RAF retirees living in East Germany through West Germany's own Intelligence Service, the Western police turned to other channels. They asked the CIA for help, but the Americans were - not without good reason - still deeply suspicious of the intelligence environment in West Germany and provided the West German police with no useful information. It was beginning to look as though the East German decision to get rid of Angelika Gerlach had been unnecessary or at least over-hasty. But other possibilities were opening up, thanks to political and economic developments that went largely unnoticed at the time. East Germany was running out of political capital as well as money. Winds of change blowing across from Moscow left the ruling political establishment internationally isolated, while rising investment in heavy engineering industrial capacity by the Soviet government meant that East German trade negotiators in search of trade deals were increasingly encountering Soviet trade negotiators not as comradely partners, but as commercial rivals. Between East and West Germany, this formed the background to a quiet growth in political contacts. Elsewhere in the public sector, the quality and extent of east–west collaboration was also evolving. In December 1987, the West German Police Service ("Bundeskriminalamt") tried the direct approach. During the run-up to an important state visit by the East German leader Erich Honecker, a senior East German Stasi official visiting Meckenheim (near Bonn) in order to help with preparations for the visit, was stopped by a senior Western police official who took the opportunity to remind his startled Eastern interlocutor of the "good collaboration involved in preparing and carrying through the official visit of Comrade Honecker to West Germany". The Westerner then slipped the Stasi man a so-called "non-paper". This consisted of eleven lines of typescript on a piece of plain paper, unembellished by any header or signature. It summarized what the Western police knew about the student career of an ex-terrorist in the German Democratic Republic, identified by the student reference "Klasse KR-FE/83", and finished with a couple of questions: "Where did Ms. Gerlach come from, and where did she end up [after disappearing from her studies]?" In the political and economic context of 1987, the matter could not simply be ignored, as might have been the case ten years earlier. But for the Stasi officials to whom the enquiry was passed on, working out how to reply was not such a simple matter.

With East-West relations still at best "uncertain", the Stasi were keen to ensure that no (further) rumours of Stasi involvement with RAF fugitives hiding in the east should come to the attention of the Western authorities. If it did, the Ministry could easily find itself blamed for serious damage to the German-German relationship. Stasi Deputy General Lieutenant Gerhard Neiber personally took responsibility for overseeing the creation of a new destiny for "Angelika Gerlach" that might take off at the point where she had disappeared. The first idea was that she had taken a trip to Lebanon from which she had never returned. Then, someone spotted that by the time of "Angelika Gerlach's" disappearance, the Interflug service between East Berlin and Beirut had been withdrawn. In the end, they settled on the idea that "Gerlach" had escaped the country by taking a camping holiday in Hungary, at the end of which she was believed to have made her way to the West rather than returning home. In order to add credibility, the Stasi arranged for one of their "informal co-workers" to file a missing person report with the police. A file of supporting paperwork was created, including the suggestion that West German police might be requested to help in the search for the missing woman believed/presumed now to be in "the West". However, in March 1988 the typed "non-paper" that the Western police official had passed to the Stasi official in Meckenheim three months earlier had still not been answered. From the Western perspective, at least officially, the disappearance in Erfurt of "Angelika Gerlach" during the early summer of 1986 remained unexplained.

Still, the West German authorities did not give up. On 3 March 1988, Reinhard Renger, a senior official from the West German Ministry of Justice attending a diplomatic function at the West German mission in East Berlin, sought out an old acquaintance from the East German Ministry of Justice and - still acting "unofficially" - took his colleague to the side. Renger explained that he knew that the terrorist Silke Maier-Witt was living under the name Gerlach in East Germany and he asked, confidentially, for help in finding her. As Renger pointed out, the situation as he had outlined it obviously could not be acceptable to the German Democratic Republic any more than to the German Federal Republic ("Das kann doch auch der DDR nicht genehm sein."). To his astonishment, three months after that informal conversation, Reinhard Renger received a brief reply. Headed "Verification of the person" ("Überprüfung der Person"), it stated simply that "... she is not staying in the German Democratic Republic" ("... daß sie sich nicht in der DDR aufhält"). The reason for his astonishment was that in the past, when the German Democratic Republic found a question from the west inappropriate, they would simply have ignored it.

=== "Sylvia Beyer" ===
A new look was mandated, involving a change of hairstyle and make-up along with a new set of clothes: the Stasi paid. It was then decided that Silke Maier-Witt's slightly crooked nose might still lead to someone to recognise her, so - slightly unusually at that time - her nose was "straightened out". The Stasi paid for that, too. As a further precaution, intended to make it harder for a future investogator to check out her background, the new identity provided by the Stasi stated that she had been born on 18 October 1948 in Moscow.

In October 1986, "Sylvia Beyer" turned up as the new boss of the documentation and information centre at the VEB- Pharma factory in Neubrandenburg, far to the north of the city of Erfurt from which "Angelika Gerlach" had disappeared six months earlier. For the second time, Silke Maier-Witt had been permitted to choose her new name for herself. To the casual listener, "Sylvia" sounded rather like "Silke" and "Beyer" sounded close to "Maier". On hearing the name she would, she reasoned, not react with a half second pause before recognition cut in, if someone addressed her by a name so similar to the one with which she had started life with. She had been badly shaken by the loss of "Angelika Gerlach": "That was one of the worst experiences of my life, when I had to change my identity again [and] had to give up everything I had tried to build up as Angelika. That’s when I really suffered. If I died, I felt, nobody would care". Despite her shock over the loss of "Angelika Gerlach", she evidently settled with her new identity well enough. Beyer contributed several pro-government "Agitprop" articles to the staff journal at VEB-Pharma.

=== "IM Anja Weber" ===
During her time in East Germany, Maier-Witt met up regularly with her Stasi confidants. A more significant meeting took place on 24 March 1984 when she took a trip to East Berlin. Her principal interlocutor was Günter Jäckel, who later became a colonel and deputy head of department within the State Security Ministry. "Angelika Gerlach" (as she was still known at this point) now became one of approximately 175,000 "informal co-workers" ("informeller Mitarbeiter)" / IMs) registered with the Ministry for State Security ("Stasi"). IMs were at the heart of a surveillance network which the authorities believed fundamental to the security of the state. Every citizen was subject to Stasi surveillance but certain categories of citizen, such as those in the public eye and those identified as potential dissidents and/or active church members, were of particular interest. The new recruit took her duties seriously, providing regular reports on her colleagues and social contacts, paying particular attention to "political" remarks or discussions. IMs were identified in Stasi records by pseudonyms: Silke Maier-Witt's Stasi pseudonym was "Anja Weber". IMs were normally paid something for their reports, though a few committed idealists refused payment, and there were also IMs who did what they did because they had been blackmailed into doing it. Towards the end of 1989, as East Germany moved towards democracy, many Stasi officials hastened to destroy the huge repositories of files on their fellow-citizens that had accumulated over the previous forty years. When this became apparent, protestors broke into the Stasi buildings around the country, in order to preserve the files as evidence for individuals who suspected they had been disadvantaged as a result of surveillance reports and for other future researchers. During 1989/90, Stasi files on Silke Maier-Witt / "Angelika Gerlach" / "Sylvia Beyer" were destroyed. Scholars working at the Stasi Records Agency since 1990 have recreated her file, but it is impossible to assess how complete a record this provides of her IM career and contributions.

=== Arrest ===
Even after the denial from the East German authorities received in 1988, the Federal Criminal Police ("Bundeskriminalamt") never closed their file on Silke Maier-Witt alias Angelika Gerlach. As the "Peaceful Revolution" ran its course, in February 1990 an East German Volkspolizei delegation visited the headquarters of the West German Criminal Police department at Wiesbaden and the Westerners took the opportunity to resubmit their request for administrative assistance with the case. Following the political developments of the previous six months, the East German police were by now working closely with their West German counterparts, and on 18 June 1990 "Sylvia Beyer" was arrested at her workplace in Neubrandenburg. It was a Monday afternoon. At that time, she was working as the head of the documentation and information centre at the VEB-Pharma and showed no surprise when the arresting officer produced his identity card; she followed him out of the building without any hesitation or show of resistance. She was the last of ten former RAF operatives to have been sought out and arrested in East Germany over the space of a few days.

=== Trial ===
Maier-Witt was now taken to West Germany. (Slightly less than four months later, East Germany and West Germany ceased to exist when they were replaced by one reunified Germany.) On 8 October 1991, the high court in Stuttgart found her guilty of hostage taking, extortion-based robbery, and other charges connected with murder, attempted murder and theft. Three linked cases were cited. Silke Maier-Witt was sentenced to ten years imprisonment.

=== Psychiatry and peace work ===
While in prison, she resumed her Psychology studies at the Carl von Ossietzky University of Oldenburg. Released early in 1995, she was finally able to complete her course, after which she went on to work in the fields of child and adolescent psychiatry, counseling and communication.

In 1999, having decided to become a peace worker, she wrote to the Federal (national) prosecutor's office in Karlsruhe to request backing. Despite her qualification as a psychologist and therapist, it was proving hard to find work as a freelancer once people recognised her name and recalled her face from the old "wanted" posters. Requesting support from the public prosecutor was nevertheless a distinctly bold decision as during the 1970s, lawyers from the West German prosecutor's office had repeatedly been targeted by the RAF. Her letter was marked for the attention of Kay Nehm, who at that time was head of the service. She assured him that "from me personally, there is no threat" ("von meiner Person keine Bedrohung ausgeht").

The case must have been well made, since the chief prosecutor in Karlsruhe reacted promptly. He confirmed to the applicant that since 1979 she had "plausibly distanced herself from the violence based ideology of the RAF". He advised the Ministry for Justice that there were "no reservations" ("keine Bedenken") over employing Maier-Witt as a peace worker and he personally wished the ex-terrorist "every success with her future plans" ("... viel Erfolg für Ihr Vorhaben"). Armed with Kay Nehm's letter of recommendation, she applied successfully to the Cologne-based "ForumZVD" ("Forum Ziviler Friedensdienst ") for training in peace work.

Silke Maier-Witt worked for the "ForumZVD" (hands-on peace organisation) in Prizren (Kosovo) between 2000 and 2005, attempting to "reconcile the irreconcilable, the perpetrators with their victims". That was followed by six months in Skopje (Macedonia), trying to draw ethnic Albanians and Macedonians towards peaceful coexistence. It was, she said at the time, her way of delivering something useful from her own past. Others should learn from her mistakes: violence does not change a society. In 2006, the German Committee for Fundamental Rights and Democracy placed her in charge of a holidays project in Ulcinj. This was part of the broader internationally backed Holidays from war project for Albanian and Serbian young people from Kosovo.

=== After Dark ===
In March 2003, Silke Maier-Witt made an extended appearance on the British television programme After Dark, discussing terrorism with Albie Sachs, Mohammad al-Massari, Jim Swire and David Shayler, among others. In the course of the discussion, Maier-Witt said she could no longer remember why she had done what she did.

=== Jörg Schleyer ===
In November 2017, slightly more than forty years after the murder of Hanns-Martin Schleyer, Silke Maier-Witt met Jörg Schleyer, his youngest son, at the Marriott Hotel in her home town of Skopje. Their meeting, set up by reporters working for the tabloid newspaper Bild, lasted for more than seven hours. After the handshake, Maier-Witt opened with a request: "It sounds so flat. But first, I want to ask for forgiveness. It does not help much, but I think that it is something I have always been avoiding". (Note: "Es klingt so platt. Aber ich möchte erst einmal um Verzeihung bitten. Es hilft nicht viel, aber ich denke, dass ich immer ausgewichen bin, mich dem zu stellen.") Reporting on the meeting, the commentator Jan Feddersen wrote a thoughtful piece in the left-leaning Tageszeitung (daily newspaper). In it, he offered his judgment that Silke Maier-Witt had become "the first former RAF member who had "seriously engaged with matters such as reconciliation, explanations, grief and a request for forgiveness".

Afterwards, Jörg Schleyer told reporters that for the first time, after forty years, he now knew, from the mouth of one of the convicted terrorists involved, the identities of the three terrorists who had been with his father when the fatal shots were fired. He expressed the hope that other criminals would follow Maier-Witt's example.

== Looking back ==
Silke Maier-Witt is one of the very few people that were, during the 1970s, participants in the RAF inner circle, who is openly self-critical in respect of her past involvement. In 2011 she was called upon to testify before the Stuttgart-based high court in a re-examination of the fatal attack in 1977 on Siegfried Buback and two companions. The question at issue was whether the RAF member Knut Folkerts had actually pulled the trigger. Maier-Witt believed he had not, but was unable to support this with conclusive evidence, and she did not dispute his involvement regardless of whether or not he had been present at the killing. She stated to her former comrades, "We are all old people now, and it no longer makes any sense to want to pursue a game of hide and seek". In various interviews since her conviction and release Maier-Witt has drawn a connection between her own membership of a terror group and her father's of the Nazi-paramilitary "SS".
