= Michael Buback =

German chemist (born 1945)

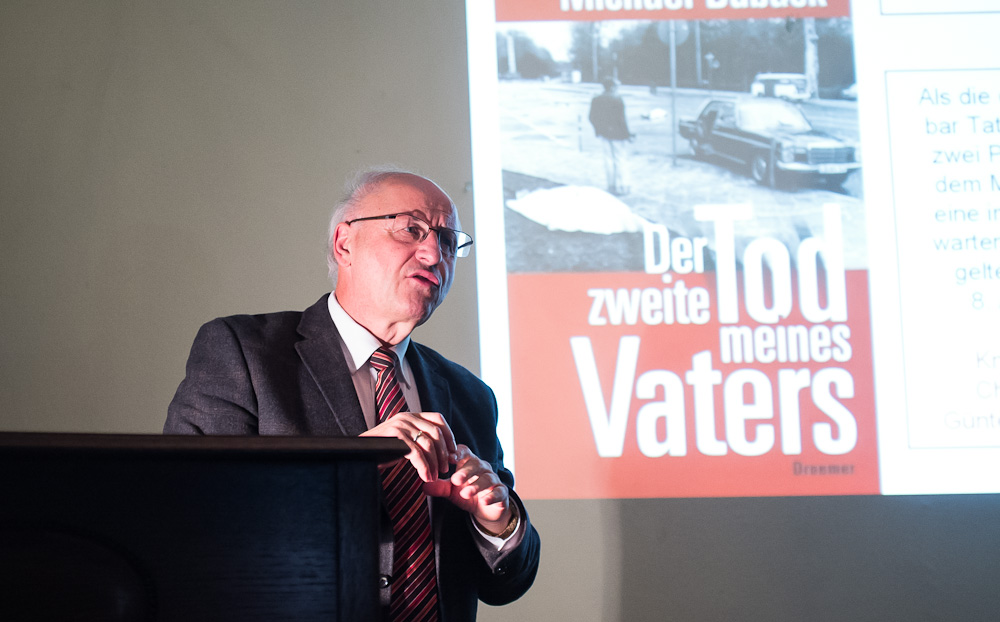
Michael Buback

Michael Buback (born February 16, 1945) is a chemist and professor at Göttingen University. He is the son of Siegfried Buback, the former chief federal prosecutor of Germany who was assassinated by Red Army Fraction (RAF) militant group in the German Autumn 1977.

== Biography ==
Buback was born in Nobitz, Thuringia and due to his father's judicial career he attended school in five different towns and cities before having his Abitur school exam in Karlsruhe. In 1963 he began to study chemistry at Karlsruhe University and finished with honors in 1967. Five years later Buback was awarded a doctorate and another 6 years later he habilitated. In 1981 he got a professorship for applied physical chemistry at Göttingen University, where he was elected dean of the faculty from 1989 to 1991. In 1995 he accepted the position of a professorship for technical and macromolecular chemistry at Göttingen University. Michael Buback has been a member of the Academy of Sciences in Göttingen since 2000. In January 2008 he accepted the position of the vice president of the Polymer Division of the International Union of Pure and Applied Chemistry (IUPAC).

He is married and has two children.

== Michael Buback, his father and the former RAF ==
In April 2007, 30 years after the assassination, Siegfried Buback's violent death became the subject of public discussion again when Michael Buback was contacted by former RAF member Peter-Jürgen Boock. Boock shared details with Buback's son indicating that it was Stefan Wisniewski who had fired the gun at Siegfried Buback. Michael Buback published the results of own investigations concerning the assassination of his father in the book Der zweite Tod meines Vaters (The Second Death of My Father) in 2008. An extended issue was released in October 2009.
