= Heckler & Koch HK43 =

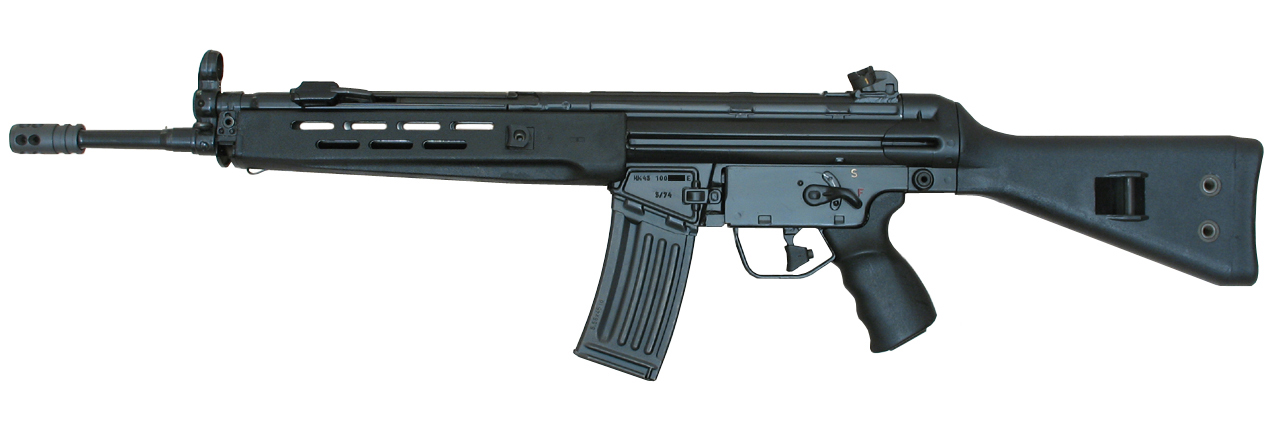
- HK43A2
- Type: Semi-automatic rifle
- Place of origin: West Germany

Production history
- Manufacturer: Heckler & Koch
- Produced: March 1974 - 1989
- Variants: KA1, A2 and A3

Specifications
- Mass: 8.4 pounds (3.8 kg) (empty magazine)
- Length: 36.2 inches (920 mm)
- Barrel length: 16.975 inches (431.165 mm)
- Cartridge: 5.56×45mm NATO, .223 Remington
- Action: Roller-delayed blowback
- Rate of fire: Semi-automatic
- Feed system: 5, 20, 25, 30 or 40-round double column, detachable box magazine
- Sights: Protected post front, rotating diopter rear sight

The Heckler & Koch HK43 is a civilian semi-automatic rifle based upon the Heckler & Koch HK33 rifle and is the predecessor of the Heckler & Koch HK93 semi-automatic rifle.

== Overview ==
The HK43 was created in 1974 as a semi-automatic version of the HK33 (which itself was a scaled down version of the Heckler & Koch G3, but chambered for 5.56×45mm NATO). According to H&K's numbering nomenclature, the "4" indicates that the weapon is a paramilitary rifle, and the "3" indicates that the caliber is 5.56 mm. The HK40-series was designed for sale to conscripts so they could be familiar with their service rifle before entering military service, a common practice in Germany and Switzerland. They had a bayonet mount and furniture just like the military model, but came with a semi-auto trigger pack instead of a full auto trigger pack. This allowed a civilian rifle to be easily made into an assault rifle just by dropping in a full auto trigger pack.

HK43 can sell for anywhere between $7,500 and $10,000 depending on the condition and the economy at the time.

An HK43 version KA1 with a shorter 322 mm barrel was used in 1977 by the German RAF urban guerrilla group to assassinate general attorney Siegfried Buback and two policemen. Verena Becker, a former RAF member, claimed Stefan Wisniewski was the killer.

== HK93 ==
The HK93 is a variant based upon the HK43 that was imported to the United States. The name change was reportedly based on several factors including the changes in barrel length to comply with US import laws and changes in H&K's own nomenclature system. Approximately 200 HK43 rifles were imported to America prior to 1974.

== C93 ==
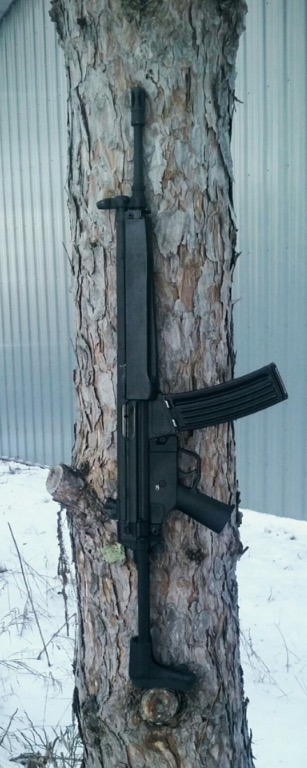
C93

The C93 is a civilian version of the HK93 created by Century International Arms, Inc.
