= Adelheid Schulz =

German terrorist (born 1955)

- Born: 31 March 1955 (age 71); Lörrach, West Germany
- Organization: Red Army Faction

Adelheid Schulz (born 31 March 1955) is a former member of the West German terrorist Red Army Faction.

== Early life ==
Having trained as a nurse, Schulz moved to Karlsruhe in the early 1970s and took up residence in a flat with Günter Sonnenberg, Knut Folkerts and her boyfriend Christian Klar – who would all at a later time be convicted of terrorist crimes. It was around this time that Schulz was exposed to radicalism, and it was in the seventies that Schulz decided to embark on a life of terrorism.

== Terrorism ==
Schulz became an important member of the second generation of the Red Army Faction.

- In 1977 she rented an apartment overlooking the villa of Jürgen Ponto, from which he was observed (he was later killed by RAF terrorists).
- Later in 1977, Schulz was involved in planning the kidnap-murder of Hanns Martin Schleyer.
- In 1978 she was involved in a gun-battle with four Dutch customs men in the border town of Kerkrade, which resulted in the deaths of two of the Dutchmen.
- Between November 1978 and April 1979, Schulz was involved in at least three bank robberies.
- On 11 November 1982, Schulz (along with Brigitte Mohnhaupt) was arrested when entering a hidden arms cache which had been staked out by police, in a forest in the Offenbach district.

== Imprisonment and release ==
Schulz was charged in connection with nearly all Red Army Faction actions between 1977 and 1981, including the murders of Ponto, Siegfried Buback and Schleyer. She was sentenced to three times life imprisonment.

In prison she took part in hunger strikes, for which she was force-fed. She described the force-feeding as follows;

"hours of nausea, a racing heartbeat, pain, and effects similar to fever. At times one experiences hot flashes; then one is freezing cold."

The hunger-strikes left Schulz weakened, and on account of her poor health she was released from prison in 1998 and eventually pardoned by President Johannes Rau in 2002.

Schulz now lives in Frankfurt, but is disabled as a result of her continued poor health, stemming from her hunger strikes.
