= Ernst-Volker Staub =

German fugitive (born 1954)

Ernst-Volker Staub (born 30 October 1954) is a German fugitive associated with the third generation Red Army Faction (RAF). Arrested in 1984, Staub was convicted of membership in a terrorist organization in 1986 and sentenced to four years in prison. Following his release in 1990, Staub went into hiding. He is wanted by the German police on suspicion of having rejoined the RAF and having been involved in further RAF activities since then.

== Biography ==
Staub was born in Hamburg, West Germany, in 1954. He stopped studying languages and law at the University of Hamburg in 1982. He is said to have joined the RAF during this time. In 1984 he was arrested in Frankfurt/Main and in 1986 he was sentenced to four years in prison for membership in a terrorist organization. After serving his prison sentence, he went into hiding in 1990 and is accused by the authorities of having rejoined the RAF.

With Daniela Klette, Burkhard Garweg and others, he is accused of participating in the Weiterstadt prison bombing in 1993 by the RAF "Katharina Hammerschmidt Command" and other criminal activities.

Staub is wanted by the BKA for forming a terrorist organization and aggravated robbery.
