= Heroinat Memorial =

Public monument in Pristina, Kosovo

- Memoriali Heroinat (Albanian)
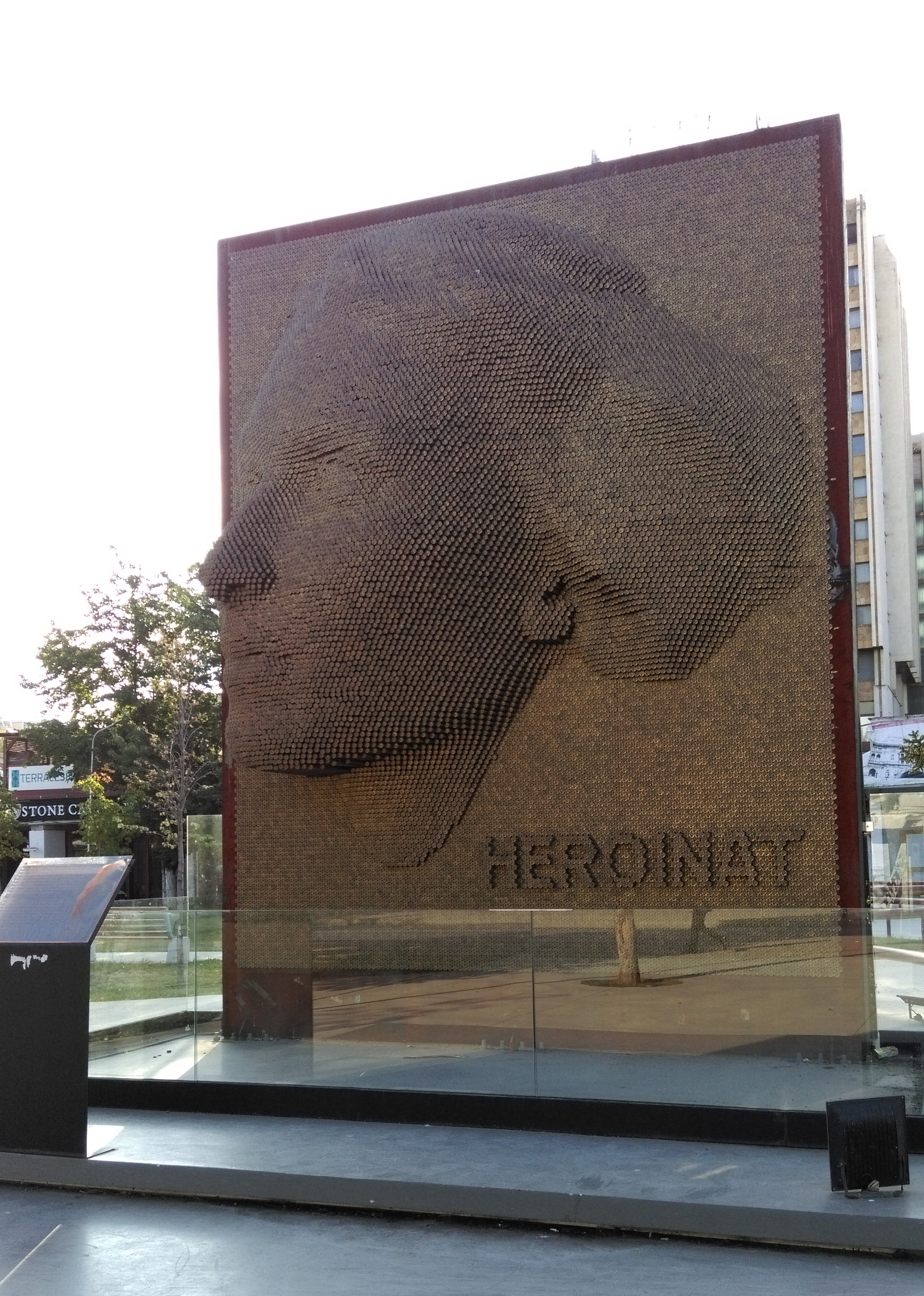
- Heroinat Memorial, June 2015
- Interactive map of Heroinat Memorial
- 42°39′37.2″N 21°9′31.07″E
- Location: Pristina, Kosovo

History
- Unveiled: 12 June 2015
- Built for: Albanian women

The Heroinat Memorial (HEROINAT) (Albanian: Memoriali Heroinat) is a typographic sculpture and tourist attraction in Pristina, Kosovo. The memorial is placed in a park in downtown Pristina, in one of Prishtina's most central and frequented areas, in front of Newborn monument. It was unveiled on 12 June 2015, celebrated as Kosovo's Liberation Day. The monument focused on creating a representative face of Kosovar women. The project was conducted mostly with photographic research. It combined different portraits, isolated their most common features, remixed them and created the representative portrait.

== Design ==
HEROINAT depicts an Albanian woman using 20,000 pins. Each pin represents a woman raped during the Kosovo War from 1998 to 1999. The pins are at different heights, creating a portrait in relief.

The sculpture has a dual perspective, macro and micro. Viewed from a near perspective, the individual portrait medals are visible. Further away, the portrait appears.

This design was created and submitted for a memorial competition in Prishtina in the autumn of 2013.

The overall memorial dimensions:

- Height: 5,50m,
- Width: 4,5m,
- Medal: 3,5 cm.

As the designers were researching, they found a Human Rights Watch article stating that nearly 20,000 Albanian women were raped during the war.

Many women were active during the war, including soldiers who fought for the KLA. Women were also active in the non-violent resistance.

== Gallery ==
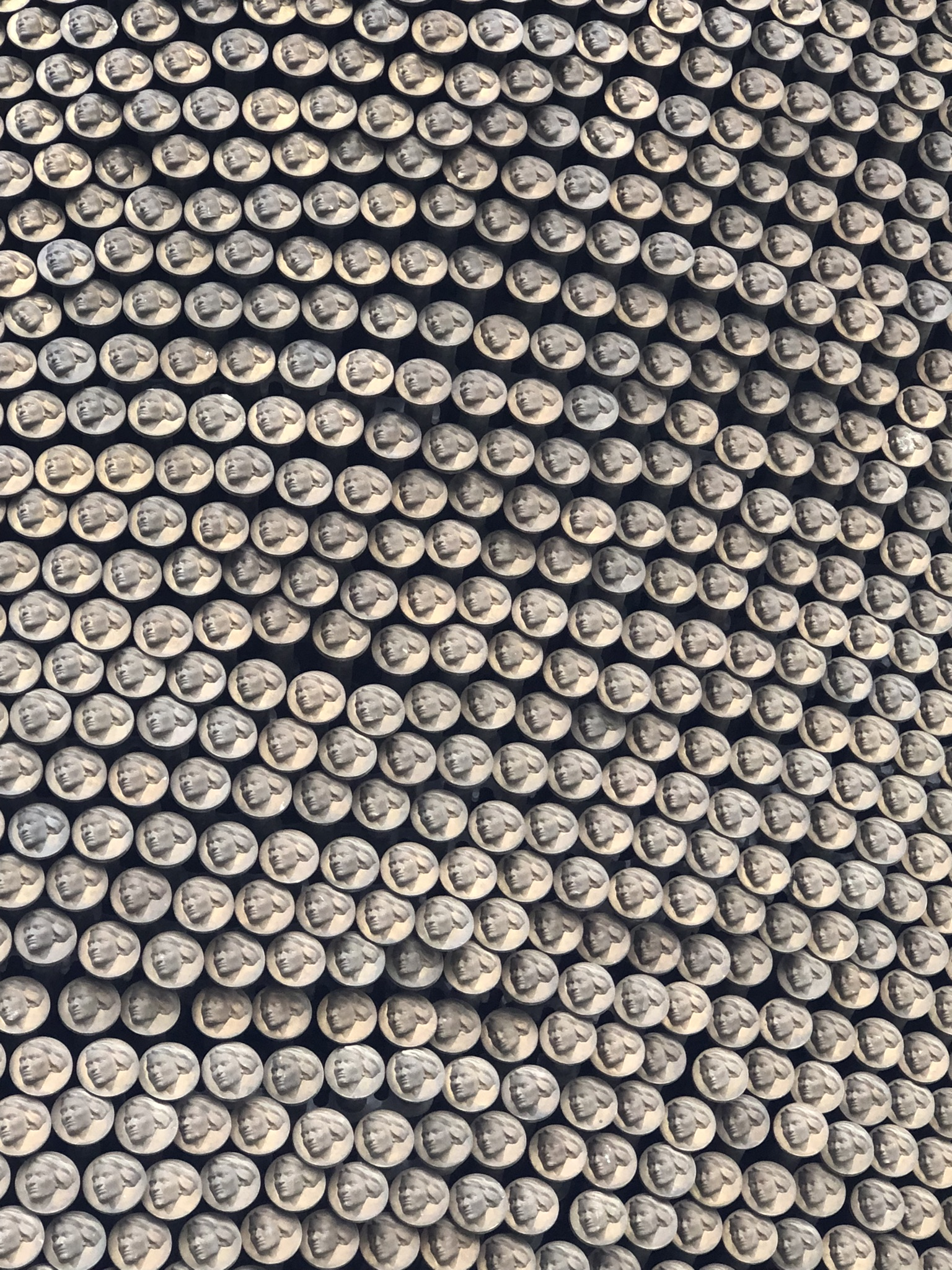
Pins that make up the sculpture. Each pin represents a woman raped during the Kosovo War

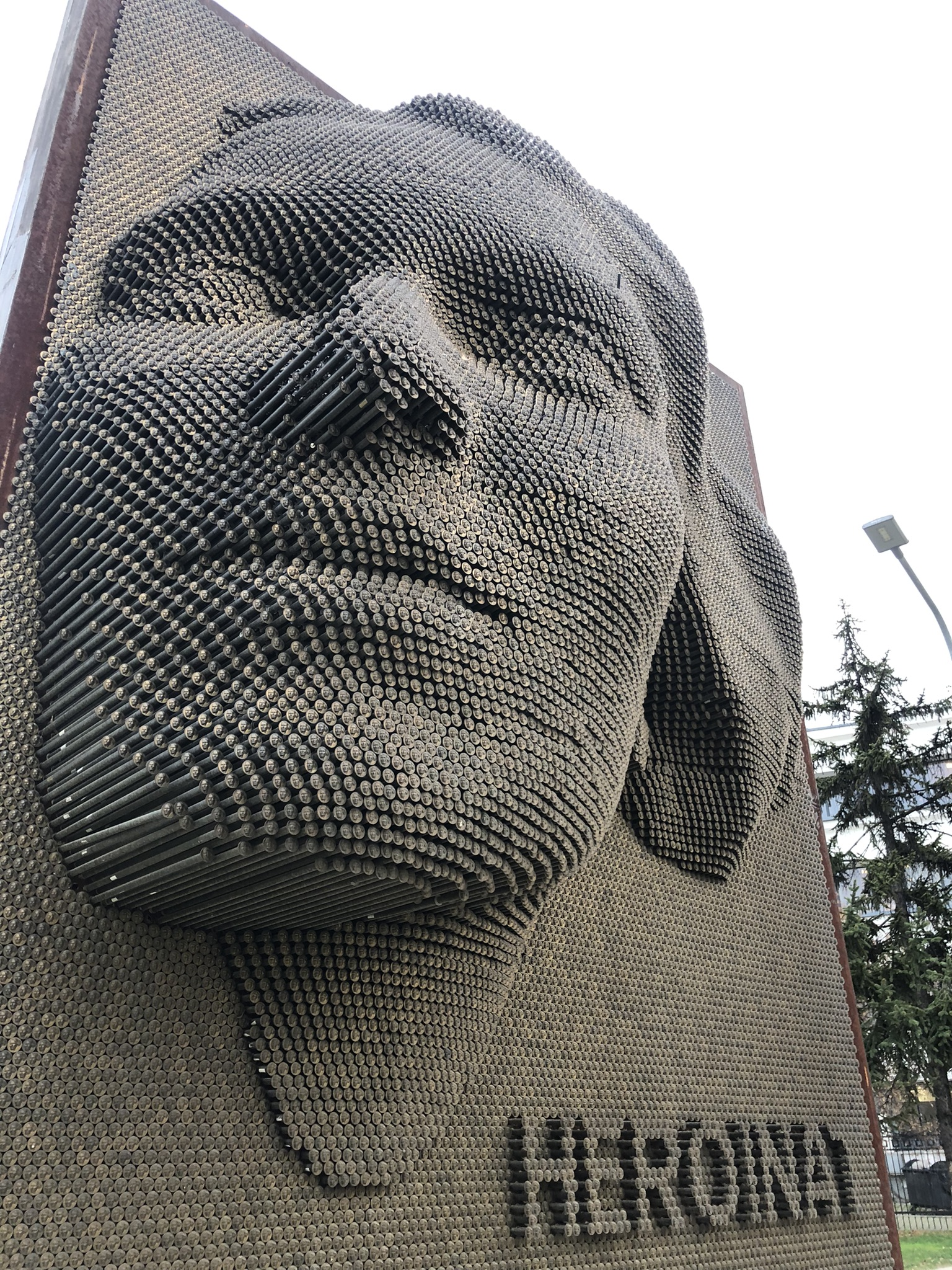
Heroinat Memorial from a low side angle

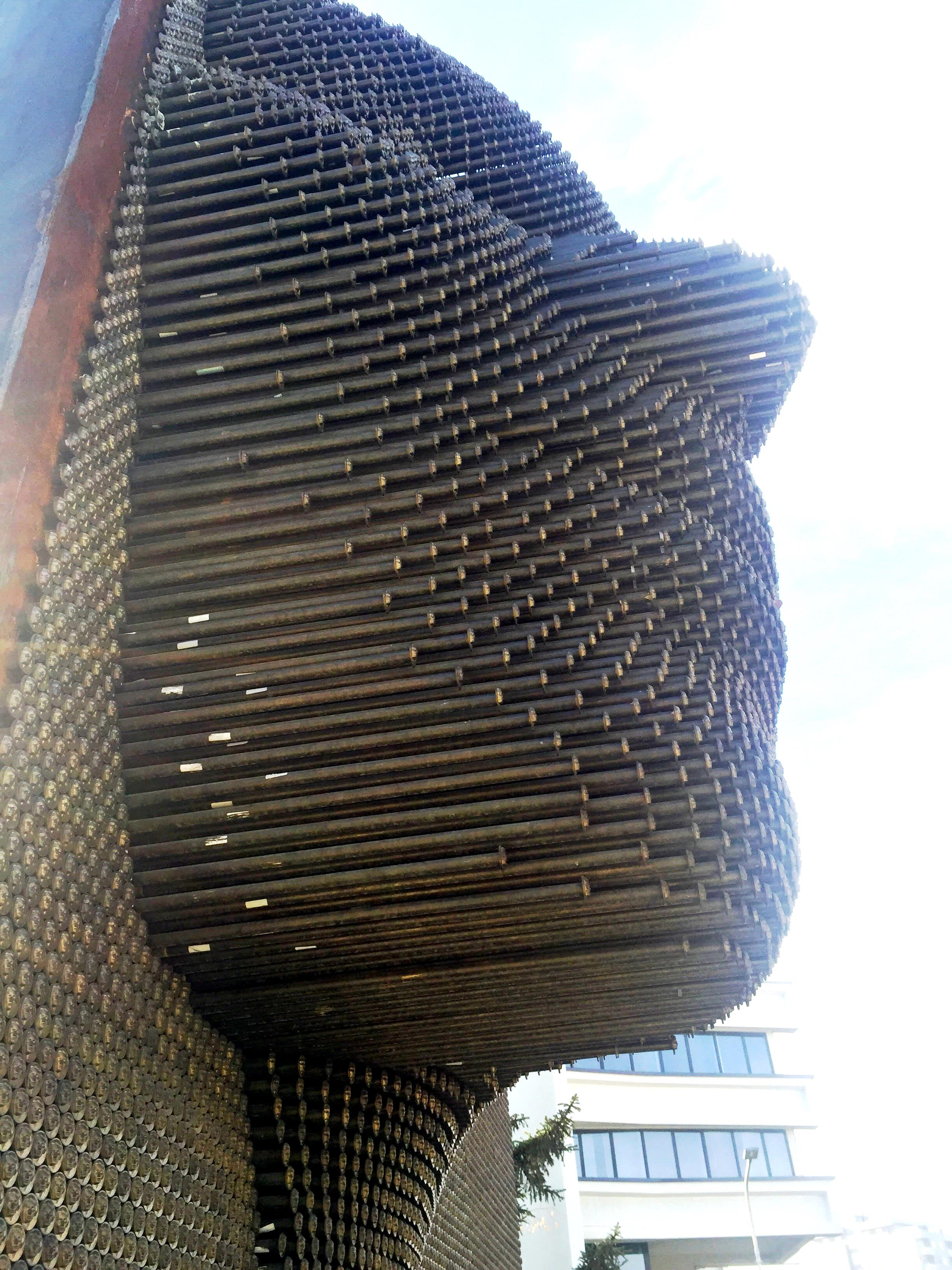
Heroinat Memorial from a lower angle, showing how the pins make up the sculpture

== See also ==
- History of Kosovo
- NEWBORN
- Women in Kosovo
