= Verena Becker =

German terrorist (born 1952)

- Born: 31 July 1952 (age 74); Charlottenburg, West Berlin, West Germany
- Organization(s): Movement 2 June, Red Army Faction

Verena Becker (born 31 July 1952) is a former West German member of the Movement 2 June and later the Red Army Faction.

== Terrorist career ==
While a student, Becker initially joined Movement 2 June (J2M) and was involved in bank robberies and the bombing of a British yacht club in West Berlin on 2 February 1972. J2M claimed this bombing was in support of the Provisional Irish Republican Army (IRA). Becker was subsequently arrested and on 13 February 1974 she was tried and found guilty of involvement in the bombing. She was sentenced to six years in prison; a year later, she was freed and flown to Aden in Southern Yemen as part of the exchange deal proposed by the Peter Lorenz kidnappers.

At some point between 1975 and 1976, Becker returned to West Germany. She became involved in the second generation RAF re-grouped around Siegfried Haag, and it is likely that she came in contact with him whilst in Yemen, as he was there at the same time.

== Arrest ==
In Singen, May 1977, Becker and fellow terrorist Günter Sonnenberg were spotted by police. Alarmed, Becker and Sonnenberg tried to flee. A gunfight ensued which left two police officers badly wounded. Sonnenberg and Becker attempted to drive off in a stolen vehicle, only to drive into a dead-end street. They abandoned the vehicle and ran, but were shot down and arrested. Sonnenberg was seriously injured by a gunshot wound to the head, and Becker was shot in the leg. A submachine gun was found in their abandoned car. It turned out to be the gun used to assassinate Chief Federal Prosecutor Siegfried Buback.

== Imprisonment ==
In late 1977 Becker was sentenced to life imprisonment for her involvement in a criminal organisation. In prison she took part in hunger strikes and was force-fed.

She was released from prison in 1989 after being pardoned by Federal President Richard von Weizsäcker. She lived anonymously in Germany, under an assumed name.

== Assassination of Siegfried Buback and rearrest ==
On 7 April 1977, Siegfried Buback, then the chief federal prosecutor for the Bundesgerichtshof, was shot and killed alongside his driver Wolfgang Göbel and a passenger, judicial officer Georg Wurster, by members of the RAF while travelling from his home in Neureut to the Bundesgerichtshof in Karlsruhe; while Buback's Mercedes was stopped at a traffic light a motorcycle pulled alongside and the passenger on the rear of the motorcycle opened fire with an semiautomatic weapon at the vehicle. There is some evidence suggesting that Becker took part in the assassination of Buback, though she herself claims Stefan Wisniewski was the one who killed him. DNA evidence however indicates that Becker probably did not take part in the killing. The case has been reopened and Becker was re-arrested on charges relating to the assassination on 28 August 2009. In April 2010, following examination of DNA on a letter claiming responsibility for the murder, she was charged for the 1977 murder. In July 2012, she was convicted of being an accessory to the murder of Buback and sentenced to four years in prison.

== Alleged informant activities ==
Some observers, chiefly former fellow member of the Movement 2 June Bommi Baumann contend that Becker had been an informant of the West German intelligence since at least 1972.
