= Daniela Klette =

German left-wing militant (born 1958)

- Born: Daniela Marie Luise Klette; 5 November 1958 (age 67); Karlsruhe, West Germany
- Organization: Red Army Faction

Daniela Marie Luise Klette (born 5 November 1958) is a German left-wing militant who is regarded as a former member of the Red Army Faction's third generation. After going underground in the 1990s, she lived for decades in Berlin under the pseudonym Claudia Ivone. After the RAF disbanded in 1998, she was arrested in 2024 as one of the last three members still on the run. From March 2025, she stood trial before the major criminal chamber of the Verden Regional Court (Landgericht) on charges of attempted murder, unlawful possession of weapons, and both attempted and completed aggravated robbery in connection with 13 robberies. On 27 May 2026, she was sentenced to 13 years in prison, but acquitted of the attempted‑murder charge due to withdrawal from the attempt. She was not prosecuted for earlier terrorist offences because the statute of limitations had expired.

== Early life ==
Daniela Marie Luise Klette was born on 5 November 1958 in Karlsruhe, West Germany.

== Activism and militancy ==
Klette was active in left-wing groups from 1975 onward. These groups included the Anti-NATO movement and initiatives against the construction of Runway 18 West at Frankfurt Airport.

Klette is alleged to have been a member of the third generation Red Army Faction active during the 1980s and 1990s. Klette is a suspect in the 1991 United States embassy sniper attack in Bonn and the 1993 bombing of a prison in Weiterstadt in the state of Hesse. In the 1990s, she went underground, living openly for decades in Berlin under a false name. In 1999, Klette, Burkhard Garweg, and Ernst-Volker Staub were suspected of robbing DM 1 million from an armoured vehicle in Duisburg.

Referred to by the press as "RAF pensioners", Staub, Garweg, and Klette are also associated with several robberies in the 2000s and 2010s: in Bochum-Wattenscheid (27 December 2006), Wolfsburg (28 December 2015), Cremlingen (25 June 2016) and Stuhr (6 June 2015). The German public prosecutor's office had been investigating the three since 2015 for attempted murder and various attempted and completed aggravated robberies between 1999 and 2016. In 2016, three Germans matching their description were mistakenly arrested by Dutch police after renting a farmhouse near Medemblik in the north of the Netherlands.

The Bundeskriminalamt (Federal Criminal Police Office) put out a public appeal for information leading to her arrest, or that of accomplices Burkhard Garweg and Ernst-Volker Staub, offering a reward of €150,000.

== Arrest ==
Police received a tip-off from the public about Klette's whereabouts in November 2023. Following this, on 26 February 2024, Klette was arrested in Berlin by Lower Saxony Landeskriminalamt and the Berlin Police without resistance. At the time of her arrest, it was unclear how she managed to stay underground for 30 years.

She was charged with involvement in six armed robberies in which millions of euros were stolen, and at least one attempted murder. The crimes, which were not committed in RAF's name, were alleged to have been committed between 1999 and 2016. Garweg and Staub were also alleged to have been involved. She was initially held in a prison in Vechta. In March 2026 it was reported that the Federal Prosecutor General had laid charges against Klette for attempted murder in 20 cases in relation to the 1991 sniper attack.

Klette lived in the neighbourhood of Kreuzberg. Police said she was in possession of fake Italian identification documents. She had a public Facebook account, to which she had uploaded photos of herself. Her photo as "Claudia Ivone" in a capoeira club in Kreuzberg was possibly found by Khesrau Behroz and Bellingcat researcher Michael Colborne, using the face biometrics software PimEyes for the Legion: Most Wanted podcast. Under German law, police are not permitted to use facial recognition software.

At the time of her arrest, Klette did not comment about the allegations made against her or her alleged RAF comrades.

== Trial and sentence ==
Klette's trial began on 25 March 2025 in a mid-level court (Landgericht) in Celle, and later moved to a more secure location in Verden.

The charge of attempted murder connected with the robberies was dismissed by the court, though prosecutors charged Klette with a separate count of attempted murder, to be tried subsequently. No terrorism charges were brought, as the statute of limitations for them had expired.

During closing arguments, Klette addressed the court. She justified her actions and apologised to the employees of the cash transit vans robbed. She did not confirm she had been a member of the RAF. Klette was convicted of aggravated robbery, weapons offenses, and other charges stemming from armed robberies committed between 1999 and 2016. On 27 May 2026 she was sentenced to 13 years in prison.

== Media coverage ==
The Lower Saxon authorities gave a live press conference announcing Klette's arrest. The state's Interior Minister Daniela Behrens (SPD) spoke of a "milestone" in German criminal history.

Klette's sentencing was extensively reported in Germany and internationally, including in the UK, France, the Nordic countries and Australia.

Petra Terhoeven, a historian specialised in the impact of left-wing terrorism on German society, criticised the "hype" around the arrest of Klette and the coverage of the RAF in general, and also asked for the RAF not to be lionised and its victims to be respected.
