= 1991 United States embassy sniper attack in Bonn =

Terrorist incident in Germany

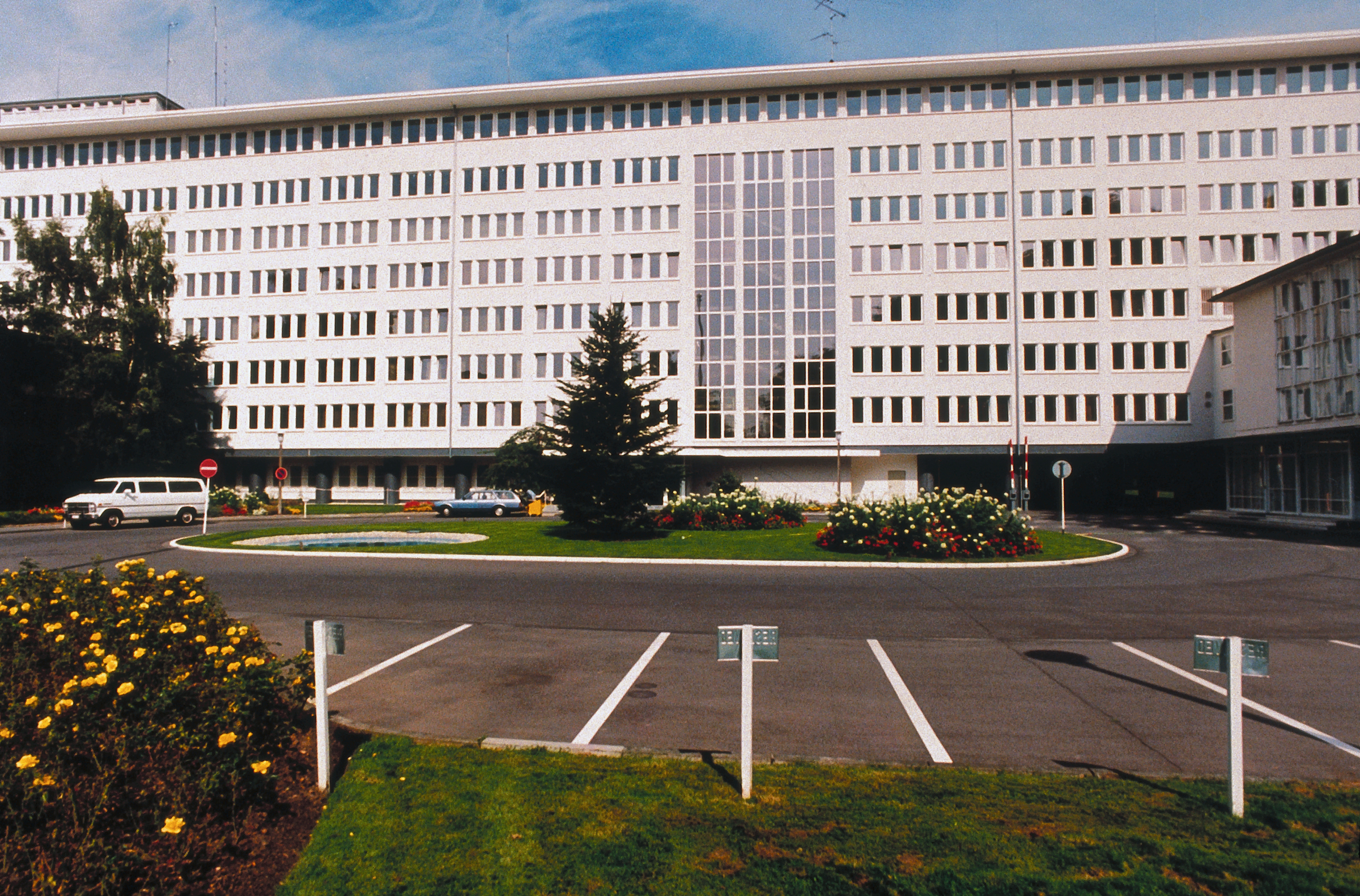
- The former embassy in Bonn, pictured in 1990
- Location: Bonn, Germany
- Date: 13 February 1991 (UTC+01:00)
- Weapon: G1
- Deaths: 0
- Injuries: 0
- Perpetrator: Red Army Faction

On 13 February 1991, three members of far-left militant organization the Red Army Faction (RAF) used a military rifle to fire about 250 rounds at the United States embassy in Bonn, Germany.

The suspects fired at the embassy from a distance of about 500 metres from Villa Von-Weiß-Straße 8, located across the Rhine river in Königswinter. The incident was linked to the ongoing Gulf War. In a note left at the scene, the RAF said the attack was done to combat American imperialism and to get it out of Iraq. The attackers escaped from their positions in a stolen Volkswagen Passat car and were never caught. The embassy received some bullet holes and broken windows, but no major damage was caused.

The same G1 rifle was used by the RAF in the killing of Detlev Karsten Rohwedder in April 1991.

In October 2001, new DNA tests of a hair left in the passenger seat of the Passat revealed that Daniela Klette may have been one of the suspects. Klette is an alleged RAF member who was already suspected in other attacks, such as the prison bombing in Weiterstadt in 1993. Klette remained at large until her arrest in 2024. Nobody else has ever been convicted for the attack.

In March 2026, it was reported that Klette had been charged by the Federal Public Prosecutor with attempted murder in 20 cases in relation to the attack.

== See also ==
- Downing Street mortar attack
