= Katharina Hammerschmidt =

Member of the Red Army Faction (1943–1975)

- Born: 14 December 1943; Gdańsk
- Died: 29 July 1975 (aged 31); West Berlin, Germany
- Years active: 1970–1971
- Organization: Red Army Faction

Katharina Hammerschmidt (14 December 1943 – 29 July 1975) was a German student of pedagogics and sympathizer of the first generation of Red Army Faction (RAF). She died in 1975 due to throat cancer, which was treated far too late in a West German state prison. When the RAF disbanded in 1998, they remembered Hammerschmidt as a victim of the prison system.

== Early life and education ==
Katharina Hammerschmidt was born in Gdańsk in 1943. She studied pedagogics.

== Career ==
In 1970 Hammerschmidt got in touch with the RAF through her friend Gudrun Ensslin. She was suspected of having transported weapons packages as a courier and of having rented apartments for the group. Police filed a warrant against Hammerschmidt and she flew from West Germany to France. Upon the advice by her lawyer Otto Schily, she returned to West Germany and turned herself in to the police on 29 June 1970. Schily had expected that Hammerschmidt would be questioned but then released, but she was taken into custody.

When she began her detention, she complained of health problems. After a physical examination, she was prescribed sedatives and laxatives.

== Illness and death ==
Hammerschmidt's health continued to deteriorate, but the prison doctors could not diagnose anything. At the end of November 1973, she suffered an attack of suffocation. Schily filed a complaint against the prison doctors for attempted murder. The notice, signed by 131 doctors, stated that “this [missing the tumor] cannot be explained by insufficient medical knowledge.”

In December 1973 she was allowed to see an independent internist. The doctor diagnosed a “tumor the size of a child’s head” in the chest area. She died a year and a half later in the West Berlin FU Clinic Steglitz.

== Legacy ==
The last official action of the RAF, the Weiterstadt prison bombing, was executed by the RAF's Katharina Hammerschmidt Command. In their communiqué the RAF wrote "We greet all who fight for dignity in prisons ....". In the bombing, the RAF attacked the new prison under construction with 200 kg of explosives. The command captured the prison guards, took them to safety, and put up warning signs for the population.
