= Ingeborg Barz =

German militant

Ingeborg Barz (1948–1972?) was a German militant who co-founded the Red Army Faction (RAF). She carried out bank robberies in Kaiserslautern and Ludwigshafen, then disappeared. It is alleged that she was shot by Andreas Baader because she wanted to leave the RAF, but conclusive evidence of her death has not been found.

== Militance ==
Barz was born in 1948. In the 1960s, she lived in Berlin with her partner Wolfgang Grundmann. She worked for Telefunken until they both decided to go underground with the Red Army Faction (RAF), which she co-founded.

On December 22, 1971 Barz, Grundmann and Klaus Jünschke stole almost 134,000 DM in a robbery of a branch of the Bayerische Hypotheken- und Wechsel-Bank in Kaiserslautern, during which a police officer was killed. The following month, she rented a flat in Hamburg under the false name Angelika von Hassow and one in the city of Ludwigshafen under the name Petra Roetzel.

== Death ==
On February 21, 1972, the day upon which the RAF carried out a robbery at another branch of the Bayerische Hypotheken- und Wechsel-Bank in Ludwigshafen, Barz called her mother and said that she wanted to leave the group. Barz was never seen again and there are various theories concerning her death. Gerhard Müller, a militant turned police informer, alleged that Barz had been murdered, but when he took police officers to look for her body, no remains were found. The author Jillian Becker writes that Barz was shot dead by Andreas Baader after being summoned to a meeting to explain why she wanted to leave the RAF. Other RAF members such as Brigitte Mohnhaupt denied that Barz had been eliminated and Gudrun Ensslin maintained that she could prove otherwise if she wanted to do so. Bommi Baumann suggested to the Stasi that Barz had been an undercover agent.

In March 1972, Grundmann and Manfred Grashof were arrested by the police after a shootout in the Hamburg flat Barz had rented. In July 1973, a walking group discovered a skeleton in woods near to Munich which the police claimed could have been Barz, although this person had been killed by blunt force trauma to the head, not by a bullet. During the 1973 Christmas period, fingerprints belonging to Barz were found on a box of birth control tablets in a hotel in Belfast, Northern Ireland.

== Sources ==
- Becker, Jillian (1978). Hitler's children: The story of the Baader-Meinhof terrorist gang (3 ed.). London: Joseph. ISBN 0-7181-1582-1.
- Kraushaar, Wolfgang (2010). Verena Becker und der Verfassungsschutz (1 ed.). Hamburg: Hamburger Edition. ISBN 978-3-86854-227-1.
- Moncourt, André; Smith, J. (2009). The Red Army Faction. Volume 1: Projectiles for the people. Montreal, Quebec: Kersplebedeb. ISBN 978-1-60486-029-0.
