= Weiterstadt prison bombing =

1993 prison attack in Germany

Coordinates: 49.89397°N 8.56342°E

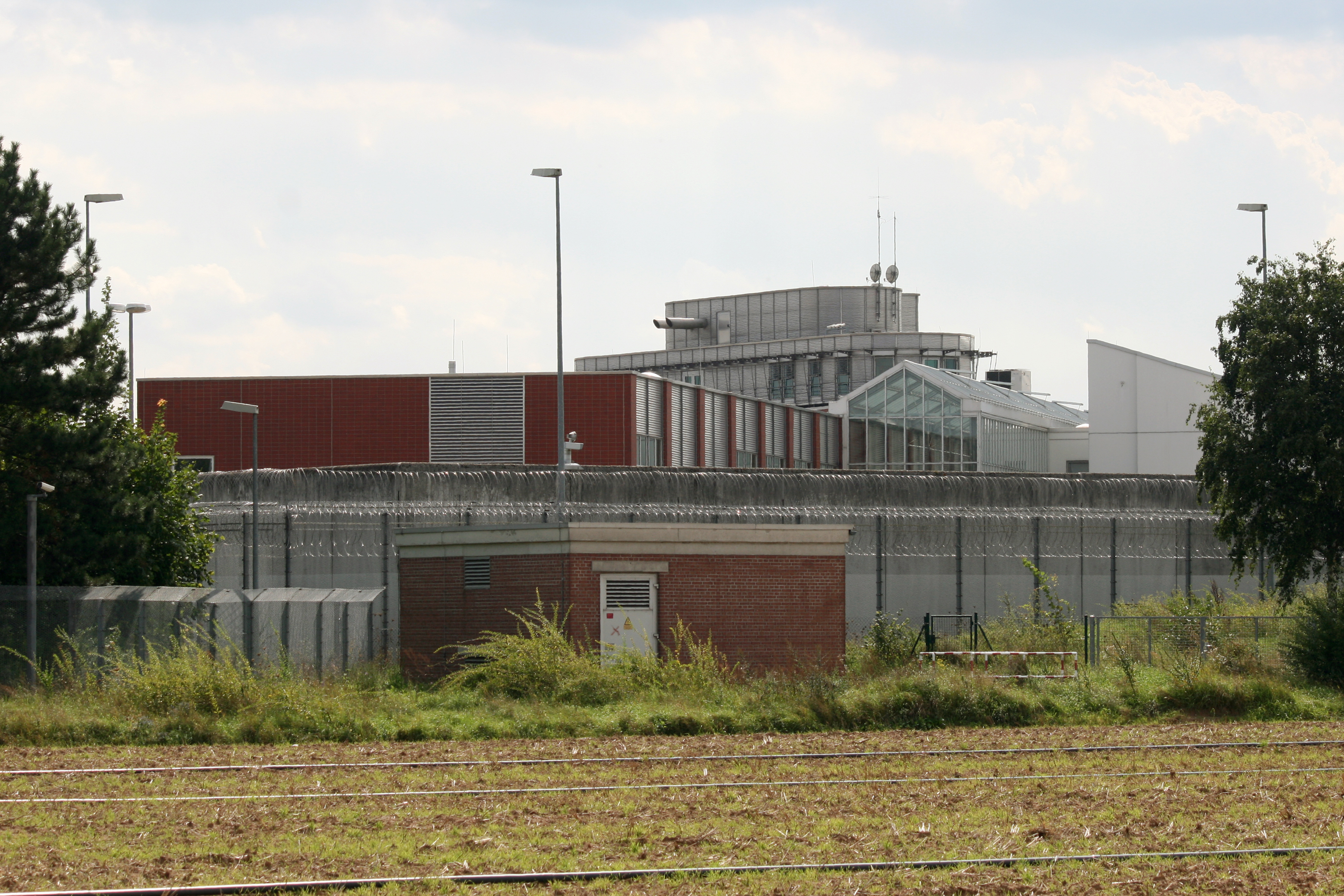
JVA Weiterstadt prison building, pictured 2010

A newly built prison in Weiterstadt, near Frankfurt am Main, Germany, was bombed and destroyed on 27 March 1993 by the militant Red Army Faction (RAF) Command Katharina Hammerschmidt. It was the RAF's "last anticapitalist attack" before it dissolved. Estimates of damage varied widely, but the prison was empty and nobody was harmed. The perpetrators were identified 14 years later through DNA evidence on ski masks left behind. Daniela Klette, one of the four perpetrators, was arrested in 2024 and imprisoned in 2026 for other crimes from 1996−the deadline set by Germany's statute of limitations for earlier crimes had expired.

== Description ==
On 27 March 1993, at least three armed and masked men and a woman climbed the 6m high wall of the newly built prison in Weiterstadt, using a rope ladder, entering the guardhouse around 1 am. The terrorists tied and abducted the 10 guards and locked them in a van near a landfill. They identified themselves as RAF`s Command Katharina Hammerschmidt to the guards. They warned the population with signs that the prison was about to be blown up and asked them to get to safety. They then brought in five cargoes with 200 kg of explosives. At 5:12 am, the explosives were detonated.

== Damage ==
The Weiterstadt prison took eight years to build and cost 250 million Marks (US$155 million). It was designed to be multi-use and high-tech.

No one was harmed as the prison was not yet in use. According to RAF expert Alexander Straßner, during the attack "the very points of criticism that had been raised against the command level in advance [...] were systematically eliminated. In the attack, target selection, technical perfection, a previously unattainable level of damage were combined with the demonstrative pre-exercise of protecting human life."

There are widely differing estimates of the cost of the damage:

- One source says that the blast destroyed the administration building and much of its security system.
- Another source quotes "€600,000 of property damage, according to German federal prosecutors".
- In 2016, the Irish Times quoted €65 million worth of damage.
- Yet another source quoted over $90 million of damage.

The prison was rebuilt over 4 years and opened in May 1997.

== Identification of perpetrators ==
Fourteen years later in 2007, using DNA analysis on hair from skimasks left behind, detectives identified three perpetrators – Burkhard Garweg, Ernst-Volker Wilhelm Staub and Daniela Klette. Klette was already wanted over the American embassy sniper attack in 1991. They belonged to the so called third generation Red Army Faction, and between 1984 and 1993 had committed "some 20 violent crimes and assassinations, leaving 34 people dead and 29 seriously injured".

Klette was arrested in February 2024, after German police tracked her down in Berlin and sentenced to 13 years' imprisonment for crimes since 1996 in 2026. She was not tried for earlier terrorist offences as a statute of limitations deadline had expired. The other two suspects remained at large.
