= Angelika Speitel =

Red Army Faction member (born 1952)

- Born: 12 February 1952 (age 73); Stuttgart, West Germany
- Organization: Red Army Faction

Angelika Speitel (born 12 February 1952) is a former member of the West German terrorist Red Army Faction (RAF).

== Life ==
Speitel worked as a clerk in the office of lawyer Klaus Croissant, alongside her husband Volker Speitel (who was also an RAF terrorist). During this time she helped form an information system of communication between many imprisoned terrorists across Germany. Volker went underground in 1974, and Angelika followed suit when she was suspected of involvement in the Jürgen Ponto murder in 1977.

She became an active member of the second generation RAF, taking part in bank robberies and was suspected to have been directly involved with the Hanns-Martin Schleyer kidnap-murder.

In a forest in Dortmund, on 24 September 1978, Speitel was involved in target practice with some other RAF members (Michael Knoll and Werner Lotze) when they were ambushed by police. A shoot-out followed where one policeman (Hans-Wilhelm Hans) was shot dead, and Speitel and Knoll were both shot down and arrested. Lotze managed to escape, and Knoll later died of his injuries.

== Imprisonment and release ==
Subsequently, Speitel was charged with murder and sentenced to life imprisonment by a Düsseldorf court. During her incarceration she attempted suicide by hanging and cutting her wrists, but she survived. In 1989, she was pardoned by Federal President Richard von Weizsäcker, and released from prison.
