= Members of the Red Army Faction =

Members of a German far-left militant organisation

Red Army Faction insignia

Members of the Red Army Faction (RAF) can be split up into three generations. The first (founding) generation existed from 1970 onwards. The second generation emerged from 1975 and included people from other groups such as the Socialist Patients' Collective (SPK) and the 2 June Movement. The third generation began in 1982. The group announced its dissolution in 1998.

== Overview ==
The Red Army Faction (RAF) existed in West Germany from 1970 to 1998, committing numerous crimes, especially in the autumn of 1977, which led to a national crisis that became known as the "German Autumn". The RAF was founded in 1970 by Andreas Baader, Gudrun Ensslin, Ulrike Meinhof, Horst Mahler, and others. The first generation of the organization was commonly referred to by the press and the government as the "Baader-Meinhof Gang", a name the group did not use to refer to itself.

The RAF was responsible for 34 deaths, including many secondary targets such as chauffeurs and bodyguards, and many injuries in its almost 30 years of activity.

Eileen MacDonald stated in Shoot the Women First (1991) that women made up about fifty percent of the membership of the Red Army Faction and about eighty percent of the RAF's supporters. This was higher than other similar groups in West Germany, in which women made up about thirty percent of the membership.

The RAF announced its dissolution in 1998 with the paper Die Stadtguerilla in Form der RAF ist nun Geschichte (The Urban Guerilla in the form of the RAF is now history).

== First generation Red Army Faction (1970–75) ==
=== Founding first generation members ===
Founding first generation members of RAF
Name	Dates	Notes
Brigitte Asdonk	1947–2025	Arrested in 1970, released from prison 1982.
Andreas Baader	1943–1977	Involved in the 1968 Frankfurt department store firebombings, founded the RAF, and was arrested during the 1972 May Offensive. Seen by the German state as a leader of the first generation alongside Ensslin, Meinhof, Meins and Raspe. Visited in jail by Jean Paul Sartre. Allegedly committed suicide by shooting himself in the back of the head in Stammheim prison on 18 October 1977.
Ingeborg Barz	1948–?	Early member, quit the RAF in 1972, thought to be dead.
Monika Berberich	1947–	Arrested in 1970, escaped in July 1976, and was recaptured two weeks later. She was released in 1988.
Gudrun Ensslin	1940–1977	Involved in the 1968 Frankfurt department store firebombings, founded the RAF, and was arrested during the 1972 May Offensive. Seen by the German state as a leader of the first generation alongside Baader, Meinhof, Meins and Raspe. Allegedly committed suicide in Stammheim prison on 18 October 1977.
Irene Goergens	1951–	Met Ulrike Meinhof as a teenager and was arrested in 1970. She was released in 1977.
Manfred Grashof	1946–	Arrested in 1977 and released in 1988.
Peter Homann	1936–2023	Founding member of the RAF, broke with the RAF after participating in the training camp in Jordan. Went with Stefan Aust to Sicily and took Ulrike Meinhof's children to their father, whereas Meinhof wanted them to go to her sister.
Horst Mahler	1936–2025	Lawyer who joined the RAF and was arrested in 1970. By 1974 he had been expelled from the RAF. After his release from prison in 1980, he went on to join the neo-Nazi Nationaldemokratische Partei Deutschlands and to found a holocaust denial group.
Ulrike Meinhof	1934–1976	A well-known radical journalist who was editor of konkret. She was married to Klaus Rainer Röhl then divorced him. She became friends with Baader and Ensslin, then helped free Andreas Baader from imprisonment on 14 Mai 1970. Arrested with Gerhard Müller in 1972 and seen by the German state as a leader of the first generation alongside Baader, Ensslin, Meins and Raspe. She was found hanged in her prison cell on 9 May 1976. The International Investigatory Commission into the Death of Ulrike Meinhof announced in 1978 that she had been sexually assaulted and murdered.
Astrid Proll	1947–	Arrested in 1971 and released to hospital in 1973 due to health conditions caused by solitary confinement. She escaped and went to England, where she was re-arrested in 1978.
Petra Schelm	1950–1971	Early member, shot dead by Hamburg police in 1971 at the age of 20.
Ingrid Schubert	1944–1977	Founding member and amongst the first group of RAF members to be arrested alongside Asdonk, Berberich, Goergens and Mahler. Allegedly committed suicide in a Munich prison on 13 November 1977, two weeks after the deaths of Baader, Ensslin and Raspe.

=== Other first generation members ===
Other first generation members of RAF
Name	Dates	Notes
Angela Luther	1940–	First involved with the Blues-Scene and West Berlin Tupamaros, but in July 1971, she met with some RAF members, and together with Thomas Weissbecker she expressed interest and started working with the RAF. On 12 May 1972 she participated in the bombing of a police station in Augsburg together with Irmgard Möller, and on 24 May 1972 she was involved in the bombing of the officers club and the Campbell Barracks in Heidelberg
Holger Meins	1941–1974	A leftist cinematography student in West Germany, he joined the Baader-Meinhof gang quite early on along with Beate Sturm and was seen as a leading member. In 1971 he was arrested alongside Raspe and Baader during a shoot-out with the police in Frankfurt. In prison the Baader-Meinhof gang called for a hunger strike, as they felt they were being treated unfairly by the government. Meins died on 11 November 1974 as a result of the hunger strike. He weighed less than 100 pounds at the time of his death; he was over six feet (1.8 m) tall. His death sparked rage amongst RAF members everywhere. Seen by the German state as a leader of the first generation alongside Baader, Ensslin, Meinhof and Raspe.
Irmgard Möller	1947–	Bombed the Campbell Barracks in Heidelberg on 24 May 1972. She claimed responsibility in the name of the Commando 15 July (the date of Petra Schelm's death) in honour of Schelm.
Jan-Carl Raspe	1944–1977	An early member of the RAF, captured a short while before both Holger Meins and Andreas Baader were arrested in Frankfurt in 1972 (he had been the driver of their Porsche Targa). Alongside Baader, Ensslin and Meinhof he was sentenced to life imprisonment at Stammheim. Raspe supposedly committed suicide in his cell using a 9 mm Heckler & Koch handgun on 18 October 1977, however, it is also claimed that he was murdered in an extrajudicial killing. Seen by the German state as a leader of the first generation alongside Baader, Ensslin, Meinhof and Meins.
Tommy Weissbecker	1944–1972	An associate of Horst Mahler and a minor member of the RAF. He was first involved with the Blues-Scene and West Berlin Tupamaros but in July 1971 he met with some RAF members and together with Angela Luther he expressed interest and started working with the RAF. In 1971 he was charged and acquitted with assaulting a Springer journalist. Later, on 2 March 1972, Weissbecker, along with Carmen Roll, was stopped by police outside a hotel in Augsburg. Weissbecker was shot dead by the police when he reached into his pocket, supposedly to grab his gun. However Stefan Aust claims that he was simply reaching into his pocket to produce ID. On 12 May 1972, over two months after Weissbecker's death, RAF members bombed a police station in Augsburg and a Criminal Investigations Agency in Munich. They claimed responsibility for the bombings in the name of the 'Tommy Weissbecker Kommando'.

== Second generation Red Army Faction (1975–1982) ==
By 1972 a large number of the core members of the Baader-Meinhof Gang had been captured and imprisoned. However, new members swelled the dwindling ranks of the Gang. These revolutionaries mostly had similar backgrounds to the first generation, e.g. they were middle class and frequently students. Most of them joined the Gang after their own groups dissolved e.g. the Socialist Patients' Collective (SPK) and Movement 2 June (J2M).

=== Former SPK members ===
The SPK, the leftist 'therapy-through-violence' group, dissolved in 1971, and those members who had turned militant forged links and joined with the Baader-Meinhof Gang. Brigitte Mohnhaupt, Klaus Jünschke Carmen Roll, and Gerhard Müller had already joined as part of the first generation of the RAF but originally started in SPK.

Former SPK members
Name	Dates	Notes
Siegfried Hausner	1952–1975	He took part in a bombing of the Axel Springer Verlag in 1971 and was the leader of the West German embassy siege in Stockholm in 1975, when he was fatally injured after TNT was accidentally detonated
Sieglinde Hofmann	1945–	An important figure of the second generation RAF and was personally involved in the kidnap and murder of Hanns-Martin Schleyer, his driver and three accompanying policemen.
Brigitte Mohnhaupt	1949–	A leader amongst the second generation RAF and was involved in some of their most serious crimes (such as the murder of Jürgen Ponto) and was a key perpetrator during the German Autumn.

=== Former M2J members ===
The Movement 2 June was founded in 1972 and was allied with the RAF but was ideologically anarchist as opposed to the Marxist RAF. In the early 1980s, the movement disbanded and many members then joined the RAF.

Former M2J members
Name	Dates	Notes
Gabriele Kröcher-Tiedemann	1951–1995	Member of Movement 2 June, arrested then freed after the Lorenz kidnapping. Involved in the 1976 OPEC siege led by Carlos the Jackal.
Rolf Pohle	1942–2004	First arrested on 17 December 1971 when he attempted to buy thirty-two firearms in a gun shop in Neu-Ulm which the police claimed were meant for the RAF. In 1974 he was sentenced to four years in prison because of membership in a criminal organisation, weapon possession and support activities for the RAF. On 3 March 1975, he was released as part of the Peter Lorenz kidnapping and exchange together with Rolf Heissler, Verena Becker, Ina Siepmann and Gabriele Kröcher-Tiedemann and ended up in South Yemen. On 21 July 1976, he was arrested again in Athens but first extradited to Germany on 1 October after a lengthy negotiation with Greece. On top of his original conviction, he was given a further three years and three months. He was released in 1982 and returned to Greece two years later. Until the outbreak of cancer, he worked as a teacher and translator. Pohle himself continued to deny any profound relations with the RAF. He died on 7 February 2004.
Ina Siepmann	1944–1982?	Arrested in 1974 then released the following year. She is thought to have lived in Lebanon and to have been killed during the Sabra and Shatila Massacre.

=== The Haag/Mayer Group ===
The Haag/Mayer Group was a minor group of members within the second generation of the RAF. They were recruited by Siegfried Haag, who organised the regrouping of the RAF in the mid-1970s together with Roland Mayer before Brigitte Mohnhaupt took over the leadership after their arrest in 1976. Knut Folkerts from SPK and Verena Becker from J2M were also part of this group.

Haag/Mayer Group
Name	Dates	Notes
Siegfried Haag	1944–	Lawyer for the first generation of the RAF, then member by 1975. He was arrested in 1976 then went underground before being arrested again; he was sentenced to 15 years of imprisonment. In detention, he distanced himself from the RAF and he was released in 1987.
Knut Folkerts	1952–	Convicted of robbing a gun shop with Willi-Peter Stoll and involvement with the assassination of Siegfried Buback in 1977. Denied the charges and was released in 1995. Also convicted for shooting dead a Dutch policeman during his arrest in Utrecht.

=== Other second generation members ===
Haag/Mayer Group
Name	Dates	Notes
Peter-Jürgen Boock	1951–	Husband of Waltraud Boock. Joined the RAF in 1976, left in 1980, arrested in 1981. In 1992, Boock admitted participating in the kidnap of Schleyer, pardoned 1998.
Silke Maier-Witt	1950–	Minor involvement in the kidnap of Hanns-Martin Schleyer and broke away from the RAF in 1979. She escaped into East Germany to avoid arrest and lived there until her capture in 1990. She served five years in jail before going on to work as a peace activist in Kosovo.
Adelheid Schulz	1955–	Was arrested with Brigitte Mohnhaupt in 1982 and imprisoned on three life sentences in 1985. Pardoned in 2002.
Angelika Speitel	1952–	Joined the RAF in 1977, the following year was shot in the leg and arrested. She was sentenced to life imprisonment and pardoned in 1998.
Sigrid Sternebeck	1949–	Moved to Hamburg in 1971 and met Susanne Albrecht, Silke Maier-Witt, Karl-Heinz Dellwo, Monika Helbing and Bernhard Rössner. In 1977 she joined the RAF and went underground. In 1980 she left the RAF and received asylum and a new identity in East Germany. She was arrested on 15 June 1990 in Schwedt together with her husband, Ralf Baptist Friedrich. After her arrest, she cooperated with the police and prosecutors and on 22 June 1992 sentenced to eight and a half years in prison due to her participation in a murder attempt on Alexander Haig and the assassination of Hanns Martin Schleyer. Today she lives under a different name in Northern Germany.
Rolf Clemens Wagner	1944–2014	Joined RAF 1976, arrested after bank heist in Switzerland, imprisoned for life then pardoned in 2003.
Stefan Wisniewski	1953–	Arrested in 1978, in Paris, on his way to Yugoslavia.

== Third generation Red Army Faction (1982–1998) ==
This generation was active mostly throughout the 1980s and early 1990s until the group disbanded in 1998.

Third generation RAF
Name	Dates	Notes
Wolfgang Grams	1953–1993	Considered a leader of the third generation. He died during the 1993 Bad Kleinen police operation to arrest him and Birgit Hogefeld; although the official investigation concluded he shot himself, the circumstances of his death have been the subject of ongoing controversy.
Eva Haule	1954–	Went underground in 1984, was arrested in 1986, and after being sentenced remained in prison until 2007.
Birgit Hogefeld	1956–	Considered a leading member of the third generation. She was arrested during the 1993 Bad Kleinen police operation to apprehend her and Wolfgang Grams. She was later sentenced to life imprisonment for co‑perpetration of murder and other RAF‑related offences, and was released in 2011.
Daniela Klette	1958–	Attempted to rob an armoured security van near Bremen in June 2015. Arrested in Berlin in February 2024, convicted of robbery-related offenses in May 2026.
Ernst-Volker Staub	1954–	Suspect in attempted robbery of an armoured security van near Bremen in June 2015.
