= Siegfried Haag =

Member of the Red Army Faction (born 1945)

- Born: 13 March 1945 (age 81); Aurich, Germany
- Organization: Red Army Faction

Siegfried Haag (born 13 March 1945) was a member of the West German Red Army Faction (RAF). He became a leading figure of the second generation of the group.

== Early career ==
After qualifying in 1973, Haag worked as a lawyer in Heidelberg and briefly defended Holger Meins in 1974 and Andreas Baader in 1975 during his trial at Stammheim.

== Terrorism ==
Haag was known to be a leftist terrorist sympathizer, and supposedly while he was working as a defence lawyer, he would act as a messenger, passing on information, between different members of the RAF. His crimes became more substantial however and in 1975 he was arrested for smuggling weapons through Switzerland (with the help of Elisabeth Von Dyck) and served six months in a detention centre. He was released and immediately went underground.

Haag became an important member of the second generation of the RAF and recruited many new members. He was once quoted as saying;

"If I am a general in the Red Army Faction, Baader is a mere corporal."

He took part in a number of bank robberies, was involved in logistics and weapons procurement. It is thought that he was crucial in planning the West German embassy siege in Stockholm, though he himself did not take part. For a period between 1975 and 1976, Haag underwent guerilla warfare training in a Southern Yemen camp, before returning to West Germany.

== Arrest ==
In November 1976 Haag was arrested in Hanover when police stopped a stolen car that he was driving. In the vehicle they found weapons and cryptic documents that revealed details of the Hanns Martin Schleyer kidnapping, which were deciphered at a later time, only in hindsight. With Haag in prison, leadership of the group was assumed by Brigitte Mohnhaupt, though authorities suspected for a while that somehow Haag was still issuing commands from prison.

In 1979 Haag was sentenced to 15 years in prison by a Stuttgart court. He was released in 1987 on account of ailing health and apparently regretted his previous life of terrorism.
