= Christian Klar =

Member of the second generation Red Army Faction (born 1952)

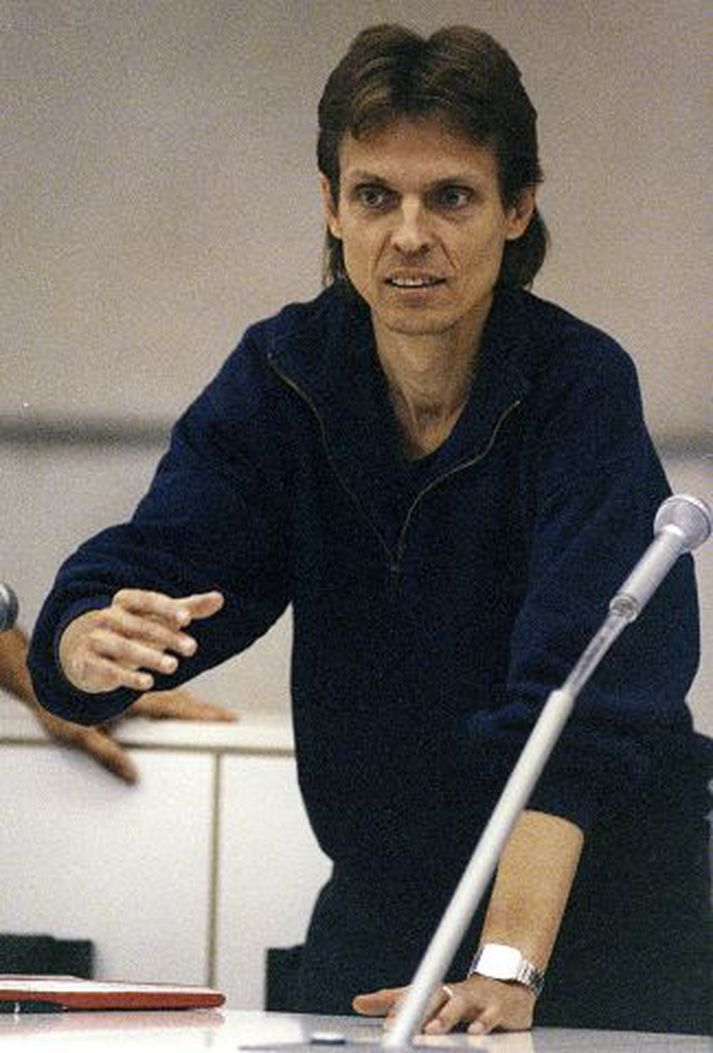
- Born: Christian Georg Alfred Klar; 20 May 1952 (age 74); Freiburg im Breisgau, West Germany
- Organization: Red Army Faction

Christian Klar (born 20 May 1952) is a former leading member of the second generation Red Army Faction (RAF), active between the 1970s and 1980s. Imprisoned in 1982 in Bruchsal Prison, he was released on 19 December 2008, after serving over 26 years of his life sentence.

== Early life ==
The son of a teacher and vice-principal, Klar attended school in Lörrach, and in 1972 graduated from a school in Ettlingen. He went on to study history and philosophy at the University of Heidelberg, and became, for a while, a member of a young democratic movement.

Around 1973 he moved to a Karlsruhe flat with his girlfriend Adelheid Schulz, Günter Sonnenberg and Knut Folkerts (who would all subsequently become RAF members) and in 1974 he took part in the occupation of the Hamburg Amnesty International offices protesting against the detention of RAF prisoners.

== Terrorism ==
Around 1976, Klar joined the RAF and soon became a leading member of the second generation.

Klar took part in the attempted kidnapping and murder of Jürgen Ponto.

He received Stasi training in explosives and handling an RPG-7, and with three other RAF members shot an RPG-7 at the Mercedes limousine of U.S. General Frederick J. Kroesen in Heidelberg on 15 September 1981.

In November 1982 he was arrested at an arms depot in Friedrichsruh. Similarly to Brigitte Mohnhaupt, he was given a collective sentence for all the major RAF crimes since 1977. These included:

- The April 1977 murder of Siegfried Buback, his driver and his bodyguard
- The July 1977 murder of Jürgen Ponto
- The kidnap and murder of Hanns Martin Schleyer and the murder of his driver and three bodyguards

He was also charged with:

- Attempted murder of a Swiss border guard and a motorist in Riehen, January 1977
- Attempted rocket attack on the offices of the federal prosecutor, in August 1977
- A Zurich bank raid, murder of a bystander, and attempted murder of a policeman, in November 1979
- An assassination attempt on U.S. General Frederick Kroesen using an RPG-7 anti-tank rocket, on 15 September 1981

== Imprisonment ==
Klar was imprisoned from 1982 to December 2008. In early 2007 he petitioned Bundespräsident Horst Köhler to be pardoned but was denied. He may have damaged his chance at a pardon by making anti-capitalist comments in January 2007, but he was released on 19 December 2008 after serving over 26 years of his life sentence.

Families of RAF victims, as well as politicians, were outraged. Jürgen Vietor, co-pilot of Lufthansa Flight 181, sent a letter of protest to the President of Germany and returned his Federal Cross of Merit. He questioned, "why do perpetrators receive more care and attention in our state than victims?"
