= Siegfried Buback =

Public Prosecutor General of Germany from 1974 to 1977

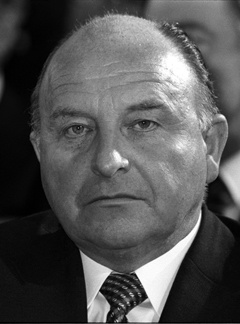
Buback in 1976

Siegfried Buback (3 January 1920 – 7 April 1977) was the Attorney General of West Germany from 1974 until his murder in 1977.

== Life and career ==
Buback was born in Wilsdruff, Saxony. He studied at the University of Leipzig. From 1940 to 1945, he was a member of the Nazi Party, while serving as a soldier in World War II. From 1945 to 1947, he was a prisoner of war in France. In 1953 he became an attorney, and continued his career until 1972 as general attorney.

His name first appeared in public in 1962 when he accused the political magazine Der Spiegel of high treason in the Spiegel scandal. In 1966, the case lead to a groundbreaking ruling of the Federal Constitutional Court of Germany about the freedom of the press.

In the 1970s he was involved in the prosecution of the Red Army Faction (RAF) and became the first assassination victim, along with his driver Wolfgang Göbel and judicial officer Georg Wurster, in a series of events called the "German Autumn".

== Assassination ==
On 7 April 1977, Buback was shot by members of the RAF while travelling from his home in Neureut to the Bundesgerichtshof in Karlsruhe. While Buback's Mercedes 230.6 was stopped at a traffic light, two unknown persons on a Suzuki GS 750 motorcycle pulled alongside him, both wearing olive green motorcycle helmets. The passenger on the rear of the motorcycle quickly fired fifteen shots with a semi-automatic HK43 rifle at the vehicle before fleeing. Buback and his driver, Göbel, died at the scene of the crime; Wurster died six days later from his injuries. Even though four RAF members (Christian Klar, Knut Folkerts, Günter Sonnenberg, and Brigitte Mohnhaupt) were formally charged and prosecuted in connection with the Buback murder, important details of their involvement have not been solved. German authorities have so far been unable to find out who was driving the motorcycle and who was firing the weapon at Buback.

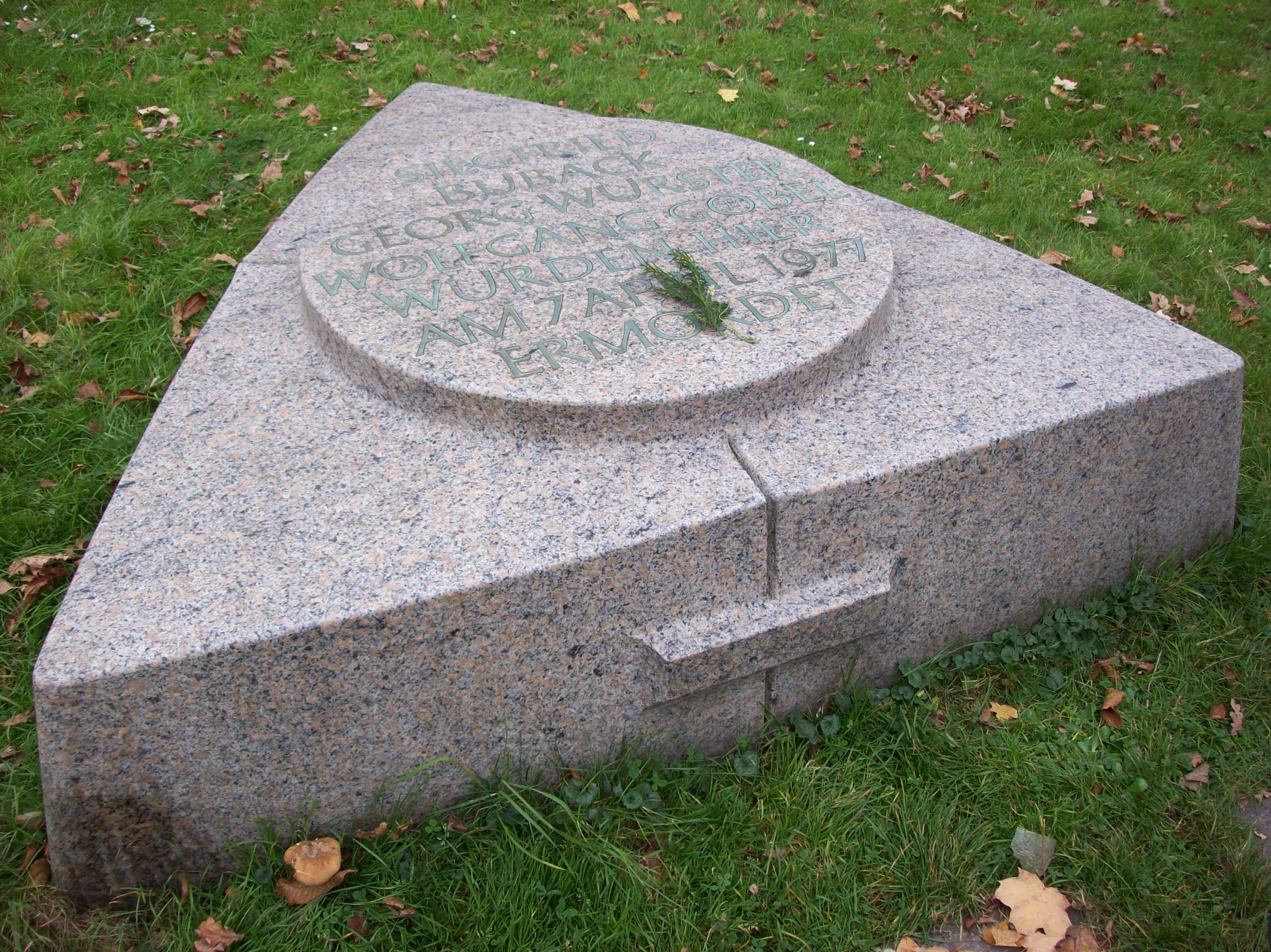
Memorial stone in Karlsruhe

In April 2007, 30 years after his assassination, Buback's violent death again became the subject of public discussion when his son, Michael Buback, was contacted by former RAF member Peter-Jürgen Boock. Boock shared details with Buback's son indicating that it was Stefan Wisniewski who had fired the gun at Siegfried Buback. Verena Becker, another former RAF member, has also claimed Wisniewski was the killer.

On 6 July 2012, Becker was convicted of assisting the (still unknown) murderers and sentenced to four years in prison.

== See also ==
- List of unsolved murders (1900–1979)
