= Women in Kosovo =

Muslim woman of Prisren (figure 1), from Les costumes populaires de la Turquie en 1873, published under the patronage of the Ottoman Imperial Commission for the 1873 Vienna World's Fair

Women in Kosovo are women who live in or are from the Republic of Kosovo. As citizens of a post-war nation, some Kosovar (or Kosovan) women have become participants in the process of peace-building and establishing pro-gender equality in Kosovo's rehabilitation process. Women in Kosovo have also become active in politics and law enforcement in the Republic of Kosovo. An example of which is the election of Atifete Jahjaga as the fourth President of Kosovo^{[a]}. She was the first female, the first non-partisan candidate, and the youngest to be elected to the office of the presidency in the country. Before becoming president, she served as Deputy Director of the Kosovo Police, holding the rank of major general, the highest among women in Southeastern Europe.

== Gender equality ==
Women in Kosovo are technically equal to men in terms of the right to voting, property rights, and work. However, less than 10 percent of all businesses in Kosovo are led or owned by women and less than 3 percent of all business loans go to women. This is partly due to the fact that women do not own the collateral needed to secure loans because property is mainly registered in the male's name. Only 18 percent of women own property and 3.8 percent inherited property. Due to cultural customs, women are often excluded from property inheritance or are expected to give up their inheritance to male relatives.

== Sexual violence during 1998-1999 conflict ==
During armed conflict in the region from 1998-1999, systematic rape was reported. According to Human Rights Watch in their 2000 report on the violence, there were 96 reported cases of rape committed by Serbian and Yugoslav forces against Kosovar Albanian women. Many believe that this number is much lower than the actual number of victims, with estimates being in the thousands.

Rape during this time took three forms: rapes in the women's houses, rapes during flight, and rapes in detention. The first form largely occurred in the villages of survivors, where they were raped in front of their families and neighbors at times. The second category applies to rapes committed against women who were internally displaced and therefore away from their homes. The last category applies to women who were raped while in temporary detention camps. Almost all of the reported rapes were gang rapes, with the majority committed by Serbian paramilitaries to deliberately terrorize civilians, extort money from familiar, or force people to flee the area.

Following the end of the conflict, many survivors had their husbands leave them and some had to then raise their children alone. These survivors then had no legal recognition of their suffering, so, in 2006, efforts began to give legal recognition to survivors of sexual violence during the conflict. It was not until 2014 that this law passed. Recently, legal measures have begun to implement reparations programs for women survivors of conflict-related sexual violence. In September 2017, the Kosovar government allocated a budget for recognizing and verifying the status of survivors. As such, these women gained the status as civilian victims of war and receive monthly pensions.

== Violence against women ==
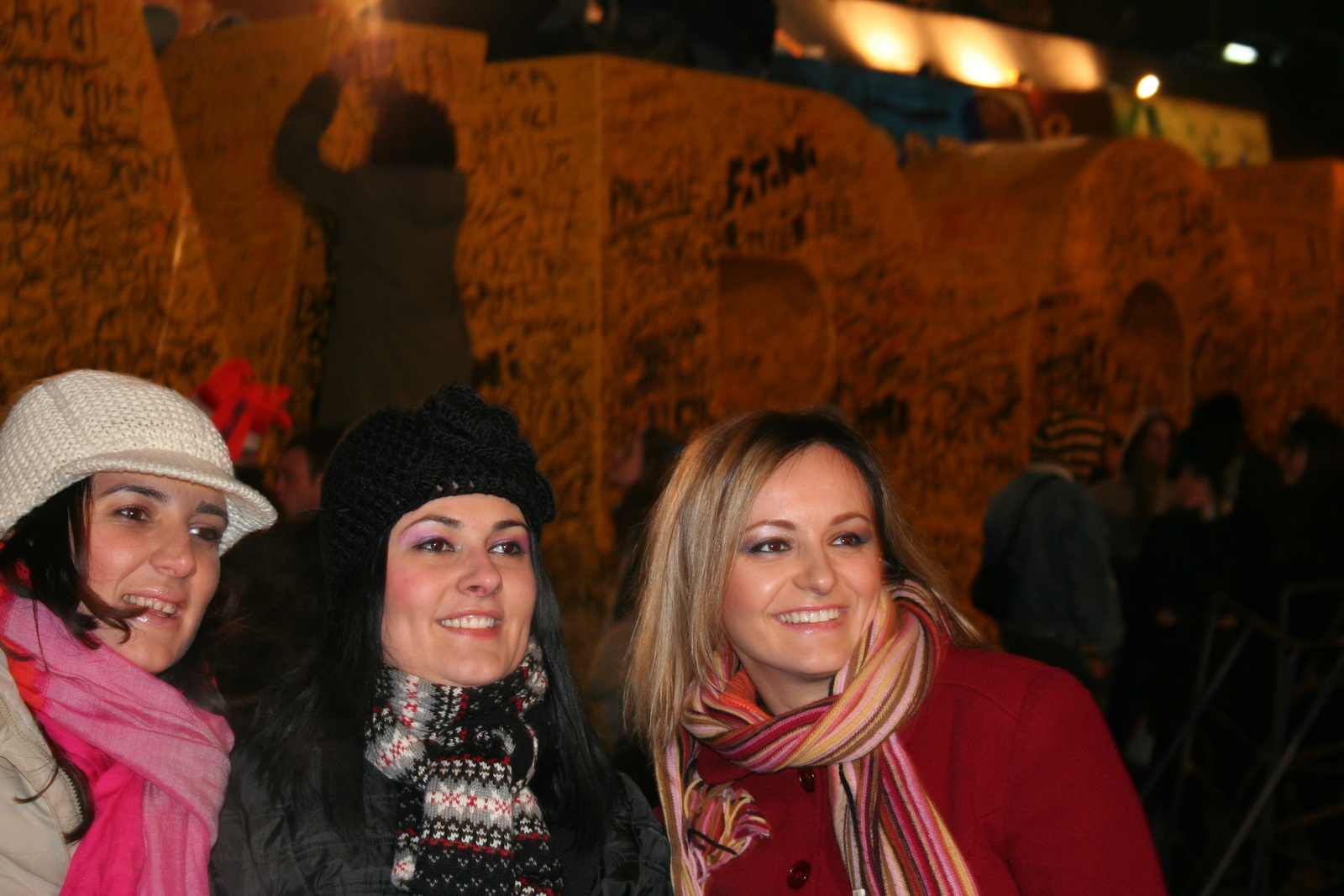
Ethnic Albanian women in Kosovo

Domestic abuse is common throughout Kosovo. In 2016, police received 870 reports of domestic violence that subsequently lead to 243 arrests. However, sources estimate that 90 percent of domestic violence incidents go unreported. In a survey done in 2015, 68 percent of women reported that they had suffered from domestic violence at one point in their lives. The survey also found that 20 percent of male and female respondents thought it was acceptable for a husband to beat his wife. This overall acceptance towards domestic violence could contribute towards the high incidence rate.

Many feel that the criminal justice system is partly to blame as the combination of police corruption and a male-sympathizing system leaves them inadequately protected. Due to the status of Kosovo, citizens cannot go to the European Court of Human Rights, so therefore must address all issues domestically.
