= Knut Folkerts =

German criminal

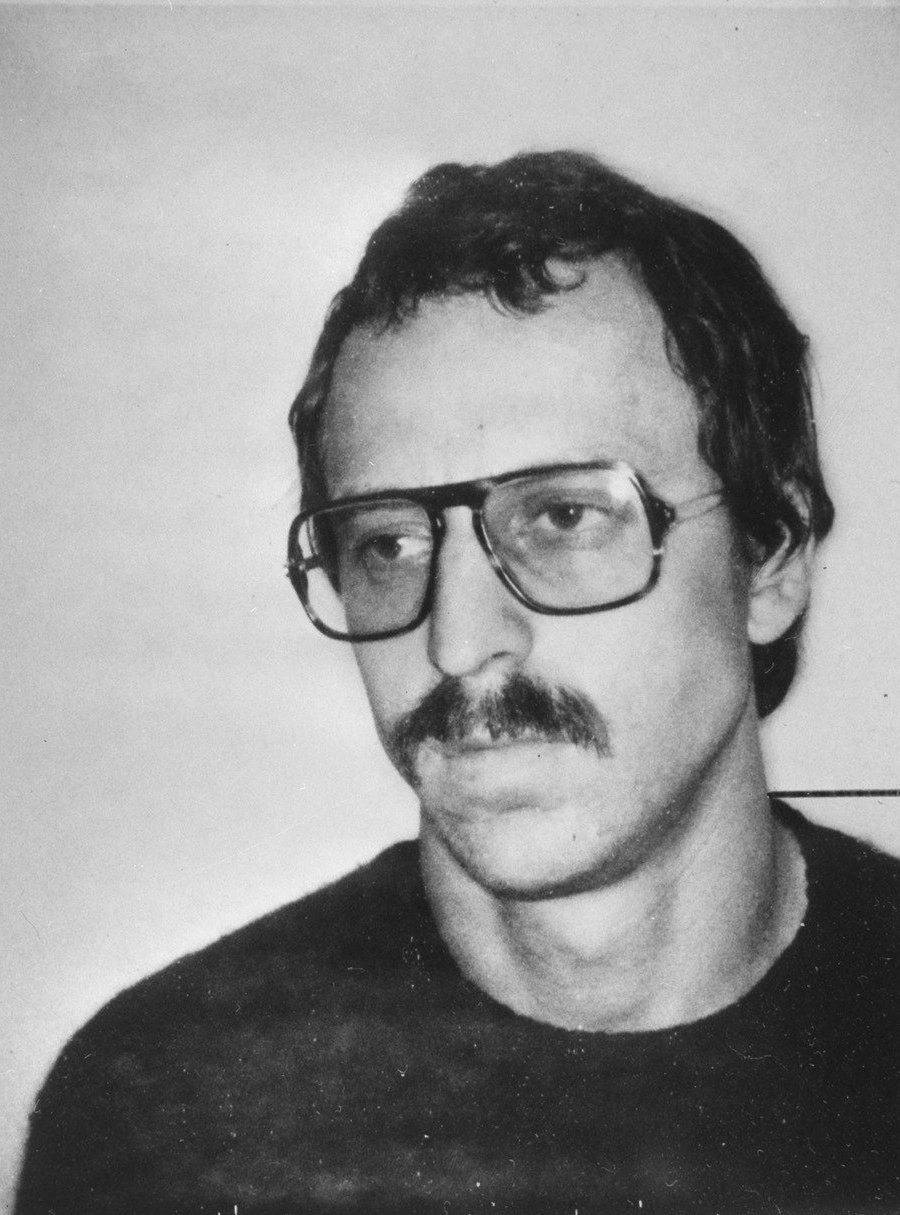
Passport photograph of Knut Folkerts

Knut Detlef Folkerts (born 1 January 1952 in Singen, West Germany) is a former member of the terrorist group Red Army Faction (RAF).

In 1977 he was sentenced to 20 years in prison in the Netherlands for murder. Later he was convicted and sentenced to life imprisonment in West Germany for crimes including the murder of public prosecutor Siegfried Buback: however he was then released from prison in 1995 when doubts were raised about the reliability of the original conviction in Germany.

== Time with the RAF and arrest ==
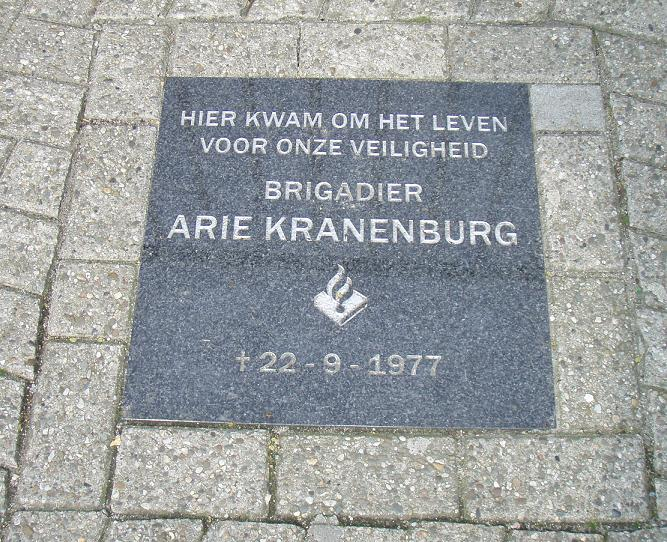
Memorial plate for policeman Arie Kranenburg in Utrecht

Folkerts was sentenced in a Frankfurt court together with Willy-Peter Stoll for the robbery of a firearms business on 1 July 1977. In an interview in 2007 he denied any involvement.

On 22 September 1977, Folkerts and Elisabeth von Dyck set out to return a car to a Dutch car rental business in Utrecht. The car had been rented by Sigrid Sternebeck and used in connection with the kidnapping and murder of Hanns Martin Schleyer. The surroundings were under surveillance and the police tried to arrest Folkerts. Folkerts fatally shot Dutch policeman Arie Kranenburg (born 10 June 1931) and seriously wounded a second officer. Folkerts was arrested, Elisabeth von Dyck, originally mistaken for Brigitte Mohnhaupt, managed to escape.

The German authorities offered Folkerts a new identity in the USA and one million Deutschmarks if he agreed to betray the hiding place of Hanns Martin Schleyer. Folkerts claimed later that the BKA at the same time threatened him with hanging if he rejected the offer.

== Trials and imprisonment ==
Knut Folkerts was sentenced in Utrecht to 20 years in prison for the murder of Arie Kranenburg. After one year in Dutch custody however he was transferred to Germany where he faced further serious charges. On 31 July 1980, he was sentenced in Stuttgart to two life terms in prison for the murder of public prosecutor Siegfried Buback and his two bodyguards, for forming a terrorist organisation and for the robbery at the firearms business in Frankfurt am Main.

On 16 October 1995, he was released early. Former RAF-members had stated that Folkerts had been in Amsterdam at the time of the murder, and so was not involved directly in the action. In May 2007 Folkerts said in an interview with Spiegel magazine, that he knew about the Red Army Faction plan to kill Siegfried Buback, but he was not directly involved. The lawyer Michael RosenthaI, interviewed by the news magazine Der Spiegel in 2007, reiterated doubts about the reliability of witnesses who had testified to having seen Folkerts at the scene of the crime.

== Legal controversy ==
On 5 August 2005, the Dutch authorities demanded, not least because of pressure from the murdered policeman's widow, Joke Kranenburg, that Folkert should serve the rest of his sentence for the Utrecht murder. They submitted a Judicial Assistance application to the German legal authorities. The Dutch move was designed to circumvent a recent (July 2005) judgement by the German Constitutional Court which had blocked the extradition of German citizens. On 31 May 2006, a court in The Hague ruled that Folkerts must serve a sentence of 20 years in the Netherlands. However, on 16 June 2011 the Hamburg Regional High Court determined that the Dutch application was inadmissible for reasons of proportionality. The Hamburg court determined that Folkert had renounced terrorism and behaved well since his release in 1995, and they also noted that he had expressed his regrets to the widow of the policeman whom he had killed.

On 28 December 2007, the investigating judges of the German Federal Court of Justice made a Coercive Detention Order of up to six months against the former RAF members Knut Folkerts, Christian Klar and Brigitte Mohnhaupt. This was intended to force the detainees to make a statement on the 1977 murder of Siegfried Buback. Folkerts' lawyer stated that he would not testify. On 7 August 2008, The Federal Court of Justice lifted the Coercive Detention Order.

== Literature ==
- Stefan Aust: Der Baader-Meinhof-Komplex. Hoffmann und Campe, Hamburg 2017, ISBN 978-3-455-00033-7.
- Pflieger, Klaus: Die Aktion "Spindy", Die Entführung des Arbeitgeberpräsidenten Hanns-Martin Schleyer, Nomos Verlagsgesellschaft Baden-Baden, 1. Auflage 1997, ISBN 3-7890-4598-5.
- Nach dem bewaffneten Kampf : ehemalige Mitglieder der RAF und Bewegung 2. Juni sprechen mit Therapeuten über ihre Vergangenheit / hrsg. von Angelika Holderberg. - Gießen: Psychosozial-Verl., 2007. - ISBN 978-3-89806-588-7.
