= Sigrid Sternebeck =

German convicted murderer (born 1949)

- Born: 19 June 1949 (age 77); Bad Pyrmont, West Germany
- Status: Released
- Allegiance: Red Army Faction
- Convictions: Murder, kidnapping, murder attempt
- Penalty: 8½ years' imprisonment

Sigrid Sternebeck (born 19 June 1949) is a German convicted murderer. She was a member of the Red Army Faction (RAF), and participated in the kidnapping and murder of Hanns-Martin Schleyer, including the murder of his driver and three policemen, and in the murder attempt on Alexander Haig. In 1980 she fled to East Germany with the help of the Stasi, which provided her with a false identity. After the fall of communism and German reunification she was arrested and charged with murder in relation to the kidnapping and murder of Hanns-Martin Schleyer and his driver and police escort, and of murder attempt on Haig; she was found guilty on 22 June 1992 and sentenced to eight-and-a-half years' imprisonment. During her trial she cooperated with the police and prosecution and therefore received a reduced sentence. Following her release from prison on probation in 1997, she has worked as a photographer. She currently lives under another name in Northern Germany.
