= Neureut (Karlsruhe) =

District of Karlsruhe

- Borough of Karlsruhe
- Coat of arms

- Location of Neureut within Karlsruhe
- Interactive map of Neureut
- Location within Germany Location within Baden-Württemberg
- Coordinates: 49°3′N 8°23′E
- Country: Germany
- State: Baden-Württemberg
- District: Urban district
- City: Karlsruhe

Area
  - Total: 19.1776 km^{2} (7.4045 sq mi)

Population (2020-12-31)
  - Total: 18,920
  - Density: 986.6/km^{2} (2,555/sq mi)
- Time zone: UTC+01:00 (CET)
  - Summer (DST): UTC+02:00 (CEST)
- Postal codes: 76149
- Dialling codes: 0721

Neureut is the northernmost district of Karlsruhe, Germany. It was the most populous rural community of Baden-Württemberg before being incorporated into Karlsruhe on February 14, 1975. Its population is about 18,920 people as of December 31, 2020.

The district is further divided into Südlicher Teil, Nördlicher Teil, Kirchfeld and Heide.

== History ==
Neureut is recorded as having been founded in 1260, under the rule of Rudolf I, Margrave of Baden-Baden. In 1699, Frederick VII, Margrave of Baden-Durlach founded a church for 58 families of Huguenot refugees from nearby France. During World War II, Neureut was heavily damaged by American planes. After the war, many American military bases were established in Germany, including one in Neureut in 1959. The American military presence there lasted until 1995. In 1975, Neureut was incorporated into Karlsruhe despite local opposition.

== Transport ==
Neureut is served by the S1 and S11 lines of the Karlsruhe Stadtbahn as well as tram line 1 for the borough of Neureut-Heide.
