= Stefan Wisniewski =

Member of the Rote Armee Faction

- Born: 8 April 1953 (age 73); Klosterreichenbach, West Germany
- Organization: Red Army Faction

Stefan Wisniewski (born 8 April 1953) is a former member of the Red Army Faction (RAF).

== Early life ==
Wisniewski was born in 1953 in Klosterreichenbach, a part of Baiersbronn, Baden-Württemberg, in the Black Forest. He was the son of Gisela, a widowed refugee from East Prussia, mother of three, and of Stanislaw Wisniewski from Kutno, a former forced labourer in German Arbeitseinsatz during World War II, who died on 9 October 1953 in Tübingen. His father had not returned to Poland, believing he would not like the communists in power there. During his youth, Wisniewski's mother warned him not to mention his father's past, since a number of former SS and SA members lived in the village.

In 1968, Wisniewski abandoned an apprenticeship as electrician, and was then forced in 1969–1970 to live in reform school, from which he fled seven times within a year. At the time, other future members of the RAF, Ulrike Meinhof (Bambule) and Gudrun Ensslin, protested also against such institutions. After his release, he moved to Hamburg, where he became an engineer on a ship. In the course of his travels, he said, he got to know the plight of the Third World.

== RAF ==
In Hamburg, Wisniewski became involved in the left-wing scene. He protested the detention of RAF members and participated in squattings and in the protests against the conservative Springer press. After the death of Holger Meins, a member of the RAF, as the result of a hunger strike in 1974, Wisniewski joined the group. In 1975, he participated in the West German Embassy siege. In the summer of 1976, Wisniewski was in a training camp of the Popular Front for the Liberation of Palestine (PFLP) in Southern Yemen.

In August 1977, he participated in a bank robbery in Essen, to finance the upcoming kidnapping of Hanns Martin Schleyer, an employers' representative and former SS member. Wisniewski was not only part of the group which kidnapped Schleyer, he was also the one who called the shots at the scene of the kidnapping. While his collaborators shot Schleyer's driver and body guards, Wisniewski drove the van in which Schleyer was taken away. It is believed that it was Wisniewski, nicknamed Die Furie (the fury), who later transferred Schleyer from Cologne to another group hideout in Brussels, Belgium, in the trunk of a car. Weeks later, Schleyer was shot and killed in a forest after the first generation RAF members died in Stammheim Prison. According to Peter-Jürgen Boock Schleyer was shot by Rolf Heißler and Stefan Wisniewski.

== Prison ==
On 11 May 1978, Wisniewski was arrested at Orly Airport in Paris and extradited to Germany. After his arrest, he was aggressive from the start. During an interrogation he assaulted a custodial judge after jumping over two tables, until he was subdued by a guard. For this, he was convicted and sentenced to eight months in prison. On 28 March 1979, Wisniewski attempted to escape from prison. Somehow, he acquired a knife and scissors, which he used to overcome a guard. He bound and gagged the guard and locked him in a cell. While leaving the prison, Wisniewski was spotted by another guard. While being returned to his cell, Wisniewski attacked the director of the jail with a sock filled with batteries. During the trial, which took several months, Wisniewski went on hunger strike, but was force-fed. On 4 December 1981, Stefan Wisniewski was convicted and sentenced to life in prison for murder, kidnapping, coercion of a constitutional body, and membership in a terrorist organization. He commented on the verdict by saying that he did not care.

In a 1997 interview with die tageszeitung, a German daily newspaper, Wisniewski called the murder of Schleyer a "disaster". He explained that setting the hostage free without receiving anything in return would have been a sign of weakness. The same year, Polish writer Hanna Krall interviewed him and wrote a story about him. In 1999, he was released on parole. The judge considered his renunciation of his actions credible.

In 2007, fellow RAF terrorists Peter-Jürgen Boock and Verena Becker stated that Wisniewski had also been involved in the shooting of the federal prosecutor Siegfried Buback, who was killed by the RAF in 1977. In 2007, Wisniewski's involvement was being investigated by the police. Becker was later convicted of assisting the (still officially unknown) murderers and sentenced to four years in prison.
