= Economic history of the German reunification =

On July 2, 1990, the East and West Germanies economies became one as part of the process of German reunification. It was the first time in history that a capitalist and a socialist economy had been joined together, and there were no precise guidelines on how it could be done. The comparatively poor productivity of the former East German economy and its links to the economies of the Soviet Union and Eastern Europe, which were rapidly contracting, posed pressing issues for the new united German government.

Even before economic unification, the West German government had decided that one of its first tasks was to privatize the East German economy. For this reason, it had taken over the Treuhandanstalt (Trust Agency, commonly known as Treuhand), which had been established by the GDR to take over East German firms and turn them over to new management through privatization, in June 1990. The agency assumed the assets and liabilities of about 8,000 East German enterprises in order to sell them to German and other bidders. The CEO of Treuhand, Detlev Karsten Rohwedder, was assassinated by far left terrorist organization Red Army Faction in Düsseldorf in 1991; by the time the Treuhand was disbanded at the end of 1994, it had privatized some 14,000 enterprises.

== Initial challenges ==
As economic unification proceeded, issues that had been recognized but inadequately understood in advance began to surface. There was massive confusion about property rights. As wave after wave of Nazi, Soviet, and later East German expropriations had taken place between 1933 and 1989, there was often little knowledge of the original ownership of property. More than 2 million claims on properties in the territory of the former East Germany (GDR) were filed by the December 31, 1992, deadline. As more claimants emerged, with many winning cases in the courts, potential investors were often scared off.

Another problem was that East German production costs had been very high. The conversion rates of the GDR mark to the Deutsche Mark often kept those costs high, as did the early wage negotiations, which resulted in wages far above the productivity level. Western German firms found it easier and cheaper to serve their new eastern German markets by expanding production in western facilities.

A third problem was that the inadequate infrastructure also became a problem for many potential investors. The telephone service was improved only very slowly. Many investors also complained about energy shortages, as many East German power stations were shut down for safety and other reasons. Roads and railroads, especially the Nazi-era Autobahns had to be virtually rebuilt because they had been so badly maintained.

In addition to these practical problems, there was also a deep policy dilemma that underlay the entire process of unification. From the beginning, there had been a pernicious link between the earlier and later phases of the East German transition to a free-market economy. Policies calculated to make the initial adjustment as painless as possible hampered long-run growth and prosperity. Real economic efficiency could only be achieved by permitting and even forcing considerable immediate dislocations, whereas temporary compromises might lead to permanent structural burdens. However, excessive disruptions could jeopardize the economic and political stability required for a smooth unification process and might also cause streams of East Germans to move west. The government was never able to solve this dilemma. When it was forced to choose, it usually selected the more expensive and slower course to encourage people to stay in the east.

=== Welfare state issues ===
The merging of the former GDR Eastern States, also known as the New Länder, with West Germany's market produced significant economic pressure on the German welfare state Germany's conservative model welfare state was sustainable under the economic conditions of pre-unification but had trouble accommodating the increased costs associated with the integration of infrastructure, migration and labor of the New Länder. The social welfare programs offered, i.e. state pensions, unemployment insurance, traditionally adhered to a means testing and an earnings related basis for recipients, which had the potential to be more generous where permitted. These expenditures are publicly financed, by the collective taxation of wage-earning employees and employers. This system requires a labor market characterized by high productivity and high employment to mitigate taxation and claims per capita for sustainability, both of which the new Länder lacked.

==== Unemployment Insurance ====
Workers contribute a portion of their income via taxation and employers match workers' contributions, where the sum is stored in a national pool that immediately reallocates funds to pay existing claims. There was an East-West productivity gap, attributed to poor labor market performance which was caused by high unemployment and lesser skilled labor in the New Länder relative to the West, increasing the demand for benefits and decreasing relative contributions for social welfare benefits. The expanded coverage of welfare policies to the New Länder permitted an exponential increase in the number of claims and beneficiaries nationwide. The disproportionately productive West had to compensate for the lack of taxed contributions, in addition to the influx in claims, from the less productive New Länder.

==== Costs ====
Increasing costs pressured reformation of the welfare expenditures. The growth in welfare costs was compounded by a decline in the contributor/beneficiary ratio: by the mid-1990s, the unemployment rate was about twice as high in the New Länder than it was in the west and the number of welfare beneficiaries had outgrown the number of wage-earning employees nationwide. Into the early 2000s, social welfare accounted for most costly portion of public expenditure: about 32% of national GDP and 50% of GDP in the New Länder. This contributed to Germany breaking deficit thresholds of the Stability and Growth Pact.

== Privatization and private investment ==
Despite these problems, the process of unification moved ahead, albeit slowly. The Treuhand, staffed almost entirely by Germans from the west, became the virtual government of eastern Germany. In the course of privatization, the agency decided which companies would live and which would die, which communities would thrive and which would shrivel, and which eastern Länder would be prosperous and which would not. It also decided who might or might not buy eastern firms or services.

Whether correct or not, reports persisted throughout the first years of unification that foreign enterprises were being screened more carefully and more skeptically than German firms even as they were being invited to invest. Less than 5% of all investment in eastern Germany was non-German, and most of that was from companies with subsidiaries in western Germany who were expanding them to the east. The Japanese did not invest, although they had previously expressed some interest, and the offices the Treuhand established in New York and Tokyo found few investors.

The economy of eastern Germany went into a deep and precipitous slump immediately after unification. Within a year after unification, the number of unemployed rose above 3 million. Industrial production in eastern Germany fell to less than half the previous rate, and the total regional product fell precipitously through 1991. One estimate was that in 1991 the entire production of eastern Germany amounted to less than 8% of that of western Germany.

Because the process of unification was managed by persons from western Germany, new eastern firms were usually subsidiaries of western firms, and they followed the western ownership and management patterns. Bank participation became customary, especially because the large Frankfurt banks assumed the assets of the former East German State Bank, and most eastern firms thus owed money to those Frankfurt banks. The banks installed their representatives on the boards of the new firms and assumed some supervisory functions—either directly or through control by western firms with bank representation. The Treuhand had close contacts with western German banks. Many of its employees came from those banks and planned to return to their jobs at the banks.

Because of these circumstances, private investment and economic growth came to eastern Germany at a relatively slow rate. Little new equity capital flowed in. Investment during the early years of unification was only 1% of the all-German GDP, when much more was needed to jump-start the economy of eastern Germany. Much of the investment was for the purchase of eastern German companies, not yet for their rehabilitation. Many western German firms bought eastern firms on a standby basis, making sure they could produce in the east when the time came and paying enough wages to satisfy the Treuhand but not starting production. Many others, including Daimler-Benz, did not even meet the commitments that they had made when they had purchased the eastern German firms from the Treuhand. Thus, western German private investment was not strong enough to boost the eastern German economy.

== Federal budget investments ==
As private funds lagged, and in part because those funds lagged, federal budget investments and expenditures began flowing into eastern Germany at a consistently high rate. Government funds were used essentially for two purposes: infrastructure investment projects (roads, bridges, railroads, and so on), and income maintenance (unemployment compensation, social security, and other social costs). The infrastructure projects sustained employment levels, and the income maintenance programmes sustained income. But neither had an early growth payoff. A review conducted in 2007 of twelve years of individual employment histories found that, generally speaking, the training of unemployed East Germans was beneficial, but involved initial negative (participants cease to actively seek employment for the first twelve to eighteen months of training) lock-in effects and that long-term retraining for construction was misguided.

Although the precise level of German official expenditures in eastern Germany has been difficult to estimate because funds appropriated in one year might have been spent in another, it is beyond dispute that the federal government expended well over DM350 billion in eastern Germany during the first three years after economic, or monetary, unification. After 1992 this requirement has continued at an annual level of around DM150 billion, so that the sum of private and public funds put into eastern Germany during the half-decade between monetary unification in 1990 and the end of 1995 would probably amount to at least DM750 billion and perhaps as much as DM850 billion. Between one-fifth and one-fourth of those funds were private, and the remainder were government funds. This constituted an infusion of outside money of about DM50,000 for every resident of eastern Germany, a far greater level of assistance than contemplated for any other area that had been behind the Iron Curtain and a token of German determination to bring eastern Germany to western levels as quickly as possible.

== Deep recession and Boom ==
As eastern Germany went into a deep recession during the first phase of unification, the western German economy went into a small boom. Western German GDP grew at a rate of 4.6% for 1990, reflecting the new demand from eastern Germany. The highest growth rate came during the second half of 1990, but growth continued at only a slightly slower pace into early 1991. Prices, however, remained relatively stable because the cost of living grew at only 2.8% despite some high wage settlements in some industries. Employment rose during the year, from 28 million to 28.7 million, and the unemployment rate sank to 7.2%. Notably, the number of registered unemployed in western Germany only declined by about 300,000, showing that at least half of the new jobs in western Germany had been taken by persons who had moved to or were commuting from eastern Germany.

The dramatic improvement in the western German figures resulted from the opening in eastern Germany of a large new market of 16 million persons and the simultaneous availability of many new workers from eastern Germany. Many easterners did not want the shoddy goods produced at home, preferring western consumer products and food. Moreover, many easterners were coming to the west to work. By the end of 1990, as many as 250,000 were commuting to work in the west, and that number was estimated to have grown to 350,000 or even 400,000 by the middle of 1991.

This meant that western Germany not only had a vast new market but also a growth of over 1% in its workforce, as sharp an increase as since the days of the economic miracle. It also increased its capital base because eastern German deposits were placed in western German banks that had come east.

The Bundesbank became worried about three elements of the sudden boom: the sudden financial shifts between east and west, which led to a jump in money supply; government deficits resulting from large expenditures in eastern Germany; and the potentially inflationary effects of a rapid growth rate in the west. The bank warned that interest rates would have to remain high to keep price increases under control. The bank raised short-term interest rates sharply through 1991 and 1992, with the average rate of short-term interest climbing from 7.1% in 1989 to 8.5% in 1990, to 9.2% in 1991 and to 9.5% in 1992. The Bundesbank permitted rates to begin falling only in 1993—to 7.3%—when it believed that the inflationary pressures had been contained by the recessionary effects of the credit squeeze.

As the Bundesbank's policies began to take hold, growth slowed in western Germany, from 4.2% in the first quarter of 1991 to 0.8% in the last quarter of 1992. For all of 1992, the western German growth rate was 1.5%, a decline from the 3.7% rate of 1991 and even more from the 4.6% rate of 1990. The eastern German growth rate was 6.1% during 1992, well below the 7% to 10% growth rate originally anticipated for the region. The number of employed in western Germany fell for the first time in ten years, by 89,000 persons. Despite the slowdown, during 1992 the German economy reached a milestone of sorts. With the addition of eastern German production, Germany's GDP rose for the first time above DM3 trillion. Of that total, the new Länder contributed a gross regional product of DM231 billion, or 7.7% (compared to the roughly 20% of unified Germany's population). However, the total of German unemployed also reached a record number, 4 million. Two-thirds of that number were unemployed in western Germany; the other one-third were unemployed in eastern Germany. Eastern Germany contributed more to unemployment than to production.

The 1992 depression continued into 1993, so that the economy actually registered a negative growth rate of -1.2%. By 1994, however, after the Bundesbank had been lowering short-term interest rates for over a year, German growth resumed at an annual rate of about 2.4%, but unemployment declined only very slowly despite the uptrend in GDP growth.

The absorption of eastern Germany, and the methods by which it had been accomplished, had exacted a high price throughout all of Germany. Germany invested over 2 trillion marks in the rehabilitation of the former East Germany, helping it to transition to a market economy and cleaning up the environmental degradation. By 2011, the results were mixed, with slow economic development in the East, in sharp contrast to the rapid economic growth in both western and southern Germany. Unemployment was much higher in the East, often over 15%. Economists Snower and Merkl (2006) suggest that the malaise was prolonged by all the social and economic help from the German government, pointing especially to bargaining by proxy, high unemployment benefits and welfare entitlements, and generous job-security provisions.

The German economic miracle petered out in the 1990s, so that by the end of the century and the early 2000s it was ridiculed as "the sick man of Europe". It suffered a short recession in 2003. The economic growth rate was a very low 1.2% annually from 1988 to 2005. Unemployment, especially in the eastern states, remained stubbornly high despite heavy stimulus spending. It rose from 9.2% in 1998 to 11.1% in 2009. The worldwide Great Recession of 2008-2010 worsened conditions briefly, as there was a sharp decline in GDP. However, unemployment did not rise, and recovery was faster than almost anywhere else. The old industrial centers of the Rhineland and North Germany lagged as well, as the coal and steel industries faded in importance.

=== Resurgence after 2010 ===
The economic policies were heavily oriented toward the world market, and the export sector continued to be very strong. Prosperity was pulled along by exports that reached a record of $1.7 trillion US dollars in 2011, comprising half of the German GDP or nearly 8% of all of the exports in the world. While the rest of the European Community struggled with financial issues, Germany took a conservative position, based on an extraordinarily strong economy after 2010. The labor market proved flexible and the export industries were attuned to world demand.

== See also ==
- Economy of the German Democratic Republic
- Economic history of Germany
