= A Perfect Crime (TV series) =

- Genre: Documentary
- Country of origin: Germany
- Original language: German
- No. of seasons: 1
- No. of episodes: 4

Production
- Running time: 38–46 minutes
- Production company: Gebrueder Beetz Filmproduktion

Original release
- Network: Netflix
- Release: 25 September 2020

A Perfect Crime (German: Rohwedder: Einigkeit und Mord und Freiheit) is a 2020 German docuseries released on Netflix on September 25, 2020. It centers on German politician Detlev Karsten Rohwedder, head of the Treuhandanstalt, who was assassinated at his home in Düsseldorf on April 1, 1991.

== Story ==
A Perfect Crime is a story described as Germany’s version of the assassination of JFK. In 1991, Detlev Karsten Rohwedder, the man given the unenviable task of privatizing state-run businesses in the former East Germany, was assassinated in his home in an affluent Dusseldorf neighborhood. The case was never solved, and this four-part series examines the story and tries to uncover the mystery.

== Cast ==
- Alfred Hartung as Günther Classen
- Tobias Kasimirowicz as Gerd Korinthenberg
- Beate Malkus as Birgit Hogefeld

== Notable interviewees ==
- Peter Bachsleitner, Rohwedder's chief of staff
- Hero Brahms, vice-president of the Treuhandanstalt
- Günther Classen, crime reporter, Düsseldorfer Express
- Peter-Michael Diestel, deputy Prime Minister and Minister of the Interior, GDR (April–October 1990)
- Willi Fundermann, spokesman for the German Federal Criminal Police Office (Bundeskriminalamt, BKA)
- Rainer Hofmeyer, head of the counter-terrorism section, BKA
- Christian "Flake" Lorenz, member of Neue Deutsche Härte band Rammstein, native of East Berlin
- Christa Luft, deputy Prime Minister and Minister of Economics, GDR (November 1989–March 1990)
- Winfried Ridder, expert on the Red Army Faction (RAF), Federal Office for the Protection of the Constitution
- Silke Maier-Witt, former member of the RAF, involved in kidnapping and murder of Hanns Martin Schleyer in 1977
- Thilo Sarrazin, economist, Ministry of Finance, West Germany/unified Germany
- Lutz Taufer, former member of the RAF, involved in West German Embassy siege in Stockholm in 1975
- Theo Waigel, Minister of Finance, West Germany/unified Germany (1989–98)

== Episodes ==
No.	Title	Original release date
1	"Märtyrer (Martyr)"	September 25, 2020
The murder of Detlev Rohwedder, shot as he stood by a window in his Düsseldorf home, shakes the nation. But insiders understood the danger he was in.
2	"Kapitalist (Capitalist)"	September 25, 2020
In a letter left at the scene of the crime the RAF claims responsibility for the assassination of Rohwedder; however, a lack of evidence and motivation shadow this in doubt.
3	"Besatzer (Occupier)"	September 25, 2020
Questions arise about the motivation behind the assassination of Rohwedder and whether or not it was the RAF or former Stasi officers.
4	"Opfer (Victim)"	September 25, 2020
Political tensions heat up after German reunification and East Germany's transition from socialism to capitalism. The police botch an operation to capture an RAF member and suspect in the assassination of Rohwedder.
