= Birgit Hogefeld =

German former Red Army Faction terrorist

- Born: 27 July 1956 (age 70); Wiesbaden, West Germany
- Citizenship: German
- Organization: Red Army Faction

Birgit Elisabeth Hogefeld (born 27 July 1956 in Wiesbaden) is a former member of the Red Army Faction (RAF), a German far‑left militant group designated as a terrorist organisation by the German government. She is regarded as one of the leading figures of the group's third generation. From 1985 onward, she was involved in several RAF attacks. Hogefeld was arrested in 1993 during a major police operation in Bad Kleinen and, in 1996, was sentenced to life imprisonment for co‑perpetration of murder and other RAF‑related offences. After serving 18 years in prison, she was released on parole in June 2011, becoming the last imprisoned RAF member to remain in custody at that time.

== Early life ==
Hogefeld is the daughter of Marianne and Josef Hogefeld. Her father had been close to the communists during the National Socialist era and felt "used" by the Nazi regime, though he did not engage in resistance. Her therapist, Horst-Eberhard Richter, saw in this a "motivating factor" for her later RAF career, as Anne‑Kathrin Griese put it. Michael Sontheimer described her life path as "exemplary of many young leftists" in the early Federal Republic of Germany (West Germany).

In retrospective reflections, Hogefeld herself wrote that since childhood she had felt a "sense of emptiness" in the face of the dominance of "material values and consumption" in the post‑war economic‑miracle (Wirtschaftswunder) society, and that "something unspoken was meant to be concealed" — namely Germany's Nazi past. This, she said, had produced a "bell of dullness, narrowness and silence," a generational "distancing from our parents" and an "experience of powerlessness and the feeling that nothing could be changed".

Hogefeld began, in what Jan Philipp Reemtsma called "a diffuse attitude of 'just doing something'", to involve herself in student councils, autonomous youth centres, social hotspots with Turkish‑German youths, and in fare strike‑protest actions. After taking part in protests against the Vietnam War, the death of RAF member Holger Meins during a hunger strike in prison in 1974, when Hogefeld was eighteen, became, in her words, "one of the decisive turning points of my life". She abandoned all her activities in social projects and began to concern herself with "isolation torture (solitary confinement), isolation wings (toten Trakts, dead wings), (Note: "Toten Trakts" (German; from Toter Trakt, plural Tote Trakte), the term used by Red Army Faction (RAF) prisoners to describe specialised high‑security, white‑walled isolation units designed to impose extreme sensory deprivation during the RAF era.) and the systematic destruction of political prisoners".

Reemtsma described this parallelisation in his analysis as "clichéd" and by no means self‑evident, while Gerd Koenen characterised it as the "replacement of all empirical reality by conjured‑up images ... a model of the peculiar idealism/irrealism of the RAF". For Hogefeld, however, this reflection became, in retrospect, a "question of my own identity, credibility and responsibility".

In 1975, she therefore began studying legal science in Frankfurt am Main, intending to work as a lawyer against such prison conditions, but abandoned her studies in 1977 due to the increasingly restrictive treatment of RAF defence lawyers by the authorities. Musically gifted — she had originally wanted to study music or become an organ builder — she then gave organ lessons. From that point on, she became active in supporting imprisoned RAF members through the Wiesbaden branch of the association Red Aid (Rote Hilfe), which had been co‑founded by her later partner Wolfgang Grams and which Alexander Straßner has described as a "recruitment pool for RAF cadres". The Federal Office for the Protection of the Constitution (Bundesamt für Verfassungsschutz, BfV) describes the Red Aid as a support organisation that stabilises and legitimises left‑wing extremist milieus.

=== Member of the RAF ===
Very few details are known about Hogefeld's career within the RAF; in 1984, she went underground together with her partner Grams, (Note: At least according to the findings of the Federal Prosecutor General and the GDR State Security (Stasi), although Hogefeld denied during the trial that she had joined the RAF in February 1984.) and for the following nine years, until her arrest in 1993, she was counted among the so‑called command level of the RAF. In doing so, according to Reemtsma, she chose "a way of life that brought experiences of power like no other".

Far less is known about the RAF's third generation — of which Hogefeld was considered one of the "leading figures" — than about its predecessors active in the 1970s. The apparently small command unit left no fingerprints, drove no conspicuous cars, kept their apartments strictly separate from weapons depots, and isolated themselves from the support scene, which meant that hardly any information reached the outside world. The extent of Hogefeld's involvement is also unclear. In an open letter to Eva Haule, she wrote that Grams "was among those who, after the arrests of seven comrades in the summer of 1984, when the RAF was effectively smashed, rebuilt it".

According to her own account to Andres Veiel, life underground was harder for Hogefeld than for Grams, who supported her as a calm counterbalance; they remained undetected by avoiding eye contact and dressing as inconspicuously and conventionally as possible. In August 1985, Hogefeld was a co‑perpetrator in the murder of U.S. soldier Edward Pimental and in the bombing of Rhein-Main Air Base, and in the years that followed, she took part in several further attacks (see the section Trial and conviction for details). In February 1987, Hogefeld and Grams were first sought publicly through a Tagesschau broadcast, after posters with the images of suspected RAF members had already been displayed nationwide since 1985.

Even while underground, Hogefeld and Grams continued to engage with Germany's Nazi past; for example, they spent an entire day at the memorial site of the Hadamar killing centre. Such experiences, Hogefeld later said, "ultimately gave us the strength to continue". They had no positive vision of a future society; instead, they were driven by "disruption/destruction, attack, and the undermining of the pig‑system (the RAF's term for the despised state apparatus)".

From the late 1980s onward, and especially after the collapse of the Eastern Bloc in 1989, discussions began within the RAF — according to Hogefeld — about reorientation and a "rapprochement with the legal left", which culminated in April 1992 in a renunciation of violence against persons, a statement for which Hogefeld is considered a co‑author. In the months that followed, Hogefeld and Grams sought contact with people who had nothing to do with the RAF to gain distance from their own worldview, including approaching the actor Matthias Dittmer. During this period, they considered exit scenarios and the possibility of returning to a normal life with a family.

== Arrest ==
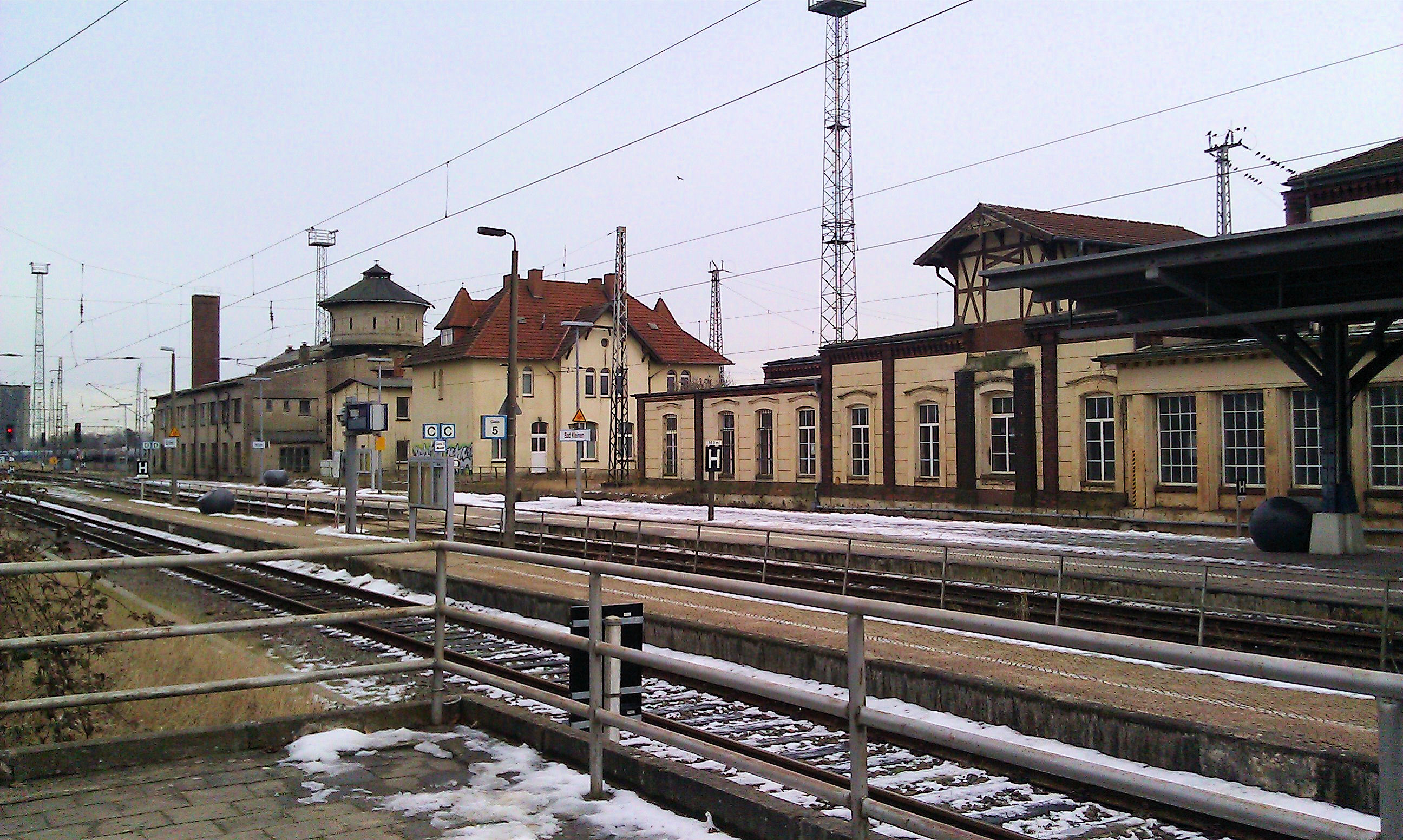
Bad Kleinen railway station, where Hogefeld was arrested

On 27 June 1993, Hogefeld arrived by train at the Bad Kleinen railway station to meet Grams and Klaus Steinmetz, who were already there. Steinmetz, a V‑Mann (undercover informant) for the Rhineland‑Palatinate Office for the Protection of the Constitution, had gained the trust of the RAF's command level and had arranged the meeting while secretly informing the authorities about it. The security services had been trying to locate and arrest Hogefeld and Grams for years, and Steinmetz’s access provided them with a rare, controlled opportunity to do so. In response, the Federal Criminal Police Office (BKA) and the GSG 9 counter‑terrorism unit of the then‑Bundesgrenzschutz (Federal Border Guard) prepared a large‑scale operation to arrest Hogefeld and Grams.

=== Sequence of events ===
Hogefeld was seized first in the station's pedestrian tunnel; she managed to shout 'Police, Police!' as she was overpowered, alerting Grams. According to police, a loaded FN HP-DA (Browning) 9mm semi-automatic pistol was found in her possession, but she was restrained so quickly that she was unable to draw it. Grams, who had been walking a few metres ahead of her in the tunnel, then ran up the stairs to the platform. According to the BKA officers, he turned and opened fire on them with a 9mm semi-automatic pistol, killing GSG 9 officer Michael Newrzella and injuring two others. The GSG 9 officers returned fire, wounding Grams in the abdomen, and he fell from the platform onto the track. According to the official investigation, Grams then attempted to take his own life while lying on the train tracks. He was airlifted to a hospital, where he later died from his injuries. Both weapons recovered from Hogefeld and Grams were subsequently identified as having been stolen in a 1984 RAF robbery of the Manfred Walla gun shop in Maxdorf.

=== Controversy and investigation ===
However, the station's kiosk attendant alleged that Grams had been shot at close range by a GSG 9 officer while he lay on the track, a claim that received wide media attention but was later deemed unreliable by investigators. The Staatsanwaltschaft Schwerin (public prosecutor's office in Schwerin) investigated these allegations and concluded in January 1994 that it was unfounded. Grams's parents challenged this conclusion in court, but it was upheld by five different courts, including the European Court of Human Rights in 1999. Interior Minister Rudolf Seiters took responsibility for the poor conduct and handling of the operation and resigned in July of that year, as did Chief Federal Prosecutor Alexander von Stahl.

== Trial and conviction ==
After the public prosecutor's office in Schwerin concluded its investigation into the GSG 9 operation in January 1994, and the federal government presented its final report in March 1994, the trial against Hogefeld opened before the State Security Senate of the Higher Regional Court of Frankfurt am Main on 15 November 1994. In the indictment filed by the Federal Prosecutor General at the Federal Court of Justice, she was charged with:

- Co‑perpetration in the murder of U.S. soldier Edward Pimental in 1985: Hogefeld had lured the young soldier out of a Wiesbaden nightclub with the prospect of a romantic encounter. He was killed that night in a forest by a gunshot to the back of the head. The judges concluded that the sole motive of the perpetrators had been to obtain his military ID card to access the grounds of the U.S. Rhein-Main Air Base near Frankfurt. Hogefeld remained silent about her own involvement, but described the act in her closing statement as "horrific and profoundly inhuman". In 2001, Eva Haule was also charged with involvement in Pimental's murder on the basis of new evidence.
- Co‑perpetration of murder in two cases, in conjunction with attempted murder in two cases, and causing an explosion (the 1985 bombing of Rhein‑Main Air Base, which killed two people and injured 23 others, including two seriously). Using Edward Pimental's ID card, obtained only hours earlier, a male RAF member entered the base the next day, parked a Volkswagen Passat loaded with 126 kilograms of explosives, and detonated it. The explosion inflicted severe injuries to the face and abdomen of one soldier, and shrapnel caused fatal head injuries to a female civilian employee; both—Airman First Class Frank Scarton and Becky Jo Bristol—died shortly afterwards. A female soldier and another soldier survived with mutilating injuries. According to a handwriting analysis, Hogefeld had signed the purchase contract for the car under a false name. The signature and the testimony of the car dealer proved her co‑perpetration, the court held.
- Co‑perpetration of attempted murder in two cases (the 1988 attack on then‑Finance State Secretary Hans Tietmeyer and his driver); Hogefeld's contribution to the crime was identified as renting the getaway car, which a handwriting analysis confirmed.
- Co‑perpetration of causing an explosion in conjunction with the destruction of buildings (the 1993 bombing of Weiterstadt prison), which was attributed to her on the basis of seized correspondence with her mother — including a letter in which she wrote that "an operation like that takes a huge amount of work" — and textile fibres found in the getaway Volkswagen Transporter that were linked to her.
- Co‑perpetration in the shooting of GSG 9 officer Michael Newrzella by Wolfgang Grams, because—even though she had already been arrested at the time of the shooting—Grams's act was attributable to her. The court held that both had agreed to shoot their way free in the event of an attempted arrest, thereby forming a joint criminal plan (§ 25(2) of the German Criminal Code).
- Membership in a terrorist organisation. (Note: Forming, joining, or supporting terrorist organisations is a criminal offence in Germany, defined in § 129a of the Criminal Code. The offence was incorporated into the Code by the Act of 18 August 1976 as part of counter‑terrorism measures, and it introduced the term "terrorist organisation" as a legal concept. The provision forms part of a package of laws sometimes referred to as the "Lex RAF", enacted with particular reference to the Red Army Faction (RAF).)

Unlike most other RAF members, Hogefeld did not adopt a "political" defence strategy, but instead adhered to the conventions of the Code of Criminal Procedure and did not comment on the charges against her. During the trial, Hogefeld made several statements in which she reflected on the RAF, as well as on her own role and situation. Even before the trial ended, she began to question her own past, describing "much in our [RAF] history as a wrong path" in her closing statement, acknowledging "catastrophic mistakes," and calling on the remaining active RAF members to declare the organisation's dissolution. Her statement "significantly contributed" to the RAF's subsequent declaration of dissolution in March 1998.

According to Andres Veiel, Hogefeld's self‑critical analysis cost her the support of other RAF members and of the wider support scene during her pre‑trial detention, and led to accusations of betrayal and ingratiation. By contrast, most of the media showed her sympathy, which in turn prompted the Federal Prosecutor's Office to "reinforce the image of the ruthless, murderous terrorist with ever new accusations."

=== Conviction and sentencing ===
On 5 November 1996, the Higher Regional Court found Hogefeld guilty on all counts of the indictment — with the exception of the charge of co‑perpetration in the killing of GSG 9 officer Michael Newrzella in Bad Kleinen. From the individual sentences for the various offences, the court formed a single aggregate sentence of life imprisonment, noting in connection with the Pimental murder that it reflected a "contempt for human life" and establishing the "particular gravity of guilt".

The judgment was partially overturned in February 1998, specifically with regard to the charge relating to the attack on the Weiterstadt prison. The 3rd Criminal Senate of the Federal Court of Justice referred that part of the case back to the Higher Regional Court of Frankfurt am Main for a new hearing and for the formation of a new aggregate sentence. There, the proceedings concerning the Weiterstadt attack were discontinued, and on 29 June 1998, a new aggregate sentence was imposed, identical in length to the previous one. The Federal Court of Justice dismissed the appeal against this decision on 5 January 1999.

=== Clemency decisions and release ===
In May 2007, Federal President Horst Köhler declined to grant Hogefeld's petition for clemency and announced that he would make a decision at a later date. At that time, she was held in Frankfurt‑Preungesheim Prison, a high‑security women's facility. While in prison, she undertook distance studies in literary studies and social psychology at the University of Hagen, completing them in 2007. In early October 2009, she was moved to open prison, where she began working as a trainee. Köhler ultimately rejected Hogefeld's clemency request definitively in May 2010. In June 2011, Hogefeld — the last imprisoned RAF member following the release of Christian Klar — was released from custody. After serving 18 years in prison, the remainder of her sentence was suspended, and she was released on five years' parole. According to RAF expert Butz Peters, Hogefeld did not accept the offer of a crown‑witness arrangement. She continues to remain silent about the precise manner in which the crimes were carried out and about those involved.

== Bibliography ==
- Veiel, Andreas (2002). Black Box BRD. Alfred Herrhausen, die Deutsche Bank, die RAF und Wolfgang Grams [Black Box FRG: Alfred Herrhausen, Deutsche Bank, the RAF, and Wolfgang Grams] (in German) (2 ed.). Munich: Deutsche Verlags-Anstalt. ISBN 3421054681.
- "Der Todesschuß, Versagen der Terrorfahnder" [The fatal shot, Failure of the anti‑terror investigators]. Der Spiegel (in German). No. 27. Hamburg. 4 July 1993.
- Holzträger, Hans; Spieler, Willy (1991). "Zu einem Nachruf auf den Vater der RAF-Angehörigen Birgit Hogefeld : Josef Hogefeld (16.1.1921 - 25.7.1990)" [An obituary for the father of RAF member Birgit Hogefeld: Josef Hogefeld (16 January 1921 – 25 July 1990)]. Neue Wege (in German). Vol. 85, no. 6. Zurich: Genossenschaft Widerdruck. doi:10.5169/seals-143621.
- Stephan, Inge; Tacke, Alexandra (2008). NachBilder der RAF, Anne-Kathrin Griese: Der familiäre Blick. Andres Veiel Black Box BRD & Christoph Hein [Successors of the RAF, Anne-Kathrin Griese: The Familial Gaze: Andres Veiel's Black Box BRD and Christoph Hein] (in German). Cologne: Bohlau Verlag. ISBN 9783412200770.
- Berg, Stefan; Sontheimer, Michael (2010). "Terroristen: Letzte Chance" [Terrorists: Last Chance]. Der Spiegel (in German). No. 7. Hamburg.
- Braunmühl, Carlchristian; Hogefeld, Birgit; Janssen, Hubertus; Richter, Horst; Rosenkranz, Gerd (1996). "Zur Geschichte der RAF" [On the History of the RAF]. Versuche, die Geschichte der RAF zu verstehen. Das Beispiel Birgit Hogefeld [Attempts to Understand the History of the RAF: The Example of Birgit Hogefeld] (in German). Gießen: Psychosozial-Verlag. ISBN 9783930096879.
- Wirth, Hans-Jürgen (2001). Hitlers Enkel oder Kinder der Demokratie? Die 68er-Generation, die RAF und die Fischer-Debatte [Hitler's Grandchildren or Children of Democracy? The '68 Generation, the RAF, and the Fischer Debate] (in German). Gießen: Psychosozial-Verlag. ISBN 3898060896. "Birgit Hogefeld: "Vieles in unserer Geschichte ist als Irrweg anzusehen". Das Schlußwort der Angeklagten." [Birgit Hogefeld: "Much of our history has to be seen as a path that went astray." The defendant's closing statement.]
- Brednich, Rolf Wilhelm (2009). Erzahlkultur: Beitrage Zur Kulturwissenschaftlichen Erzahlforschung. Hans-Jorg Uther Zum 65. Geburtstag [Narrative Cultures: Contributions to Cultural Narrative Research. Hans‑Jörg Uther on His 65th Birthday] (in German). Berlin: De Gruyter. ISBN 9783110214710.
- Kraushaar, Wolfgang; Reemtsma, Jan Philipp; Wieland, Karin (2005). Rudi Dutschke, Andreas Baader und die RAF [Rudi Dutschke, Andreas Baader and the RAF] (in German). Hamburg: Hamburger Edition. ISBN 9783936096545. "Was heißt "die Geschichte der RAF verstehen"?" [What does it mean to 'understand the history of the RAF'?]
- Hogefeld, Birgit (20 November 1996) [1995-07-21]. "Prozesserklärung vom 21. Juli 1995" [Trial statement of 21 July 1995] (Document) (in German). Hamburg: Nadir.
- Koenen, Gerd (2011). Das rote Jahrzehnt. Unsere kleine deutsche Kulturrevolution 1967–1977 [The Red Decade: Our Little German Cultural Revolution, 1967–1977] (in German) (5 ed.). Frankfurt am Main: Fischer Taschenbuch. ISBN 9783596155736.
- Straßner, Alexander (2003). Die dritte Generation der "Roten Armee Fraktion". Entstehung, Struktur, Funktionslogik und Zerfall einer terroristischen Organisation [The Third Generation of the Red Army Faction: Emergence, Structure, Operational Logic, and Decline of a Terrorist Organisation] (in German). Wiesbaden: Westdeutscher Verlag. ISBN 3531141147.
- Kailitz, Steffen (2004). Politischer Extremismus in der Bundesrepublik Deutschland. Eine Einführung [Political Extremism in the Federal Republic of Germany: An Introduction] (in German). Wiesbaden: VS Verlag für Sozialwissenschaften. ISBN 3531141937.
- Rosenkranz, Gerd (13 October 1997). "Wir waren sehr deutsch" [We were very German]. Der Spiegel (in German). No. 42. Hamburg.
- Igel, Regine (29 June 2013). "Wolfgang Grams, Terrorist an der Seite der Stasi" [Wolfgang Grams, a terrorist working alongside the Stasi] (in German). Hannover: Telepolis.
- Sattar, Majid (7 May 2007). "RAF: Birgit Hogefeld und die "dritte Generation"" [RAF: Birgit Hogefeld and the 'Third Generation'] (in German). Frankfurt am Main: Frankfurter Allgemeine Zeitung.
- "Left-wing extremism". Berlin: Bundesamt für Verfassungsschutz. 2026.
- Jackson, James (23 August 1993). "Death On Track 4". Time USA. New York.
- "Dreimal Lebenslang und ein Freispruch. RAF-Mitglied Hogefeld wegen Mordes verurteilt - "Menschenverachtend"" [Three life sentences and one acquittal. RAF member Hogefeld convicted of murder – "Contemptuous of humanity"] (in German). Koblenz: Rhein-Zeitung. 6 November 1996. Archived from the original on 28 December 2004.
- "Mitteilung der Pressestelle des Bundesgerichtshofs Nr. 24/1998: Bundesgerichtshof hebt Urteil gegen die RAF-Terroristin Birgit Hogefeld teilweise auf" [Notice from the Press Office of the Federal Court of Justice No. 24/1998: Federal Court of Justice partially quashes the judgment against RAF terrorist Birgit Hogefeld.] (in German). Karlsruhe: Bundesgerichtshofs (Federal Court of Justice). 19 March 1998. Archived from the original on 6 December 2008.
- "Mitteilung der Pressestelle des Bundesgerichtshofs 3/99: Urteil gegen RAF-Terroristin Birgit Hogefeld rechtskräftig" [Notice from the Press Office of the Federal Court of Justice No. 3/99: Federal Court of Justice confirms the finality of the judgment against RAF terrorist Birgit Hogefeld.] (in German). Koblenz: Bundesgerichtshofs (Federal Court of Justice). 19 January 1999.
- Gast, Wolfgang (11 April 2010). "Ex-RAF-Mitglied Hogefeld: Über Nacht weiter in die Zelle" [Ex‑RAF member Hogefeld: Back in her cell overnight] (in German). Berlin: Die Tageszeitung.
- "RAF: Gnadengesuch abgelehnt" [RAF: Clemency request rejected] (in German). Hamburg: Die Zeit. 7 May 2007.
- "Köhler lehnt Begnadigung von Hogefeld erneut ab" [Köhler once again denies clemency for Hogefeld] (in German). Berlin: Mitteldeutsche Zeitung. 10 June 2011.
- Isenson, Nancy, ed. (17 May 2010). "Clemency denied; President Horst Koehler of Germany has denied clemency to a leftist terrorist serving a life sentence for the murder of a US soldier and the deadly bombing of an American airbase". Bonn: Deutsche Welle.
- "Ex-RAF-Mitglied Hogefeld aus Haft entlassen" [Ex‑RAF member Hogefeld released from prison]. Der Spiegel (in German). Hamburg. 21 June 2011.
- Jansen, Frank (10 June 2011). "Reststrafe zur Bewährung: Frühere RAF-Terroristin Hogefeld kommt auf freien Fuß" [Remaining sentence suspended: Former RAF terrorist Hogefeld released from custody]. Der Tagesspiegel (in German). Hamburg.
- "RAF-Terroristin Daniela Klette in U-Haft: Der entscheidende Hinweis ging schon im November 2023 ein" [RAF terrorist Daniela Klette in custody: Key tip-off was received as early as November 2023]. Der Tagesspiegel (in German). Hamburg. 28 February 2024. ISSN 1865-2263.
- Peters, Butz (23 January 2016). "Dritte RAF-Generation: Rückkehr der Untoten" [Third RAF generation: Return of the undead]. Der Spiegel (in German). Hamburg.
