= Rhein-Main Air Base bombing =

1985 attack on a US base near Frankfurt, West Germany

Coordinates: 50.0298°N 8.5834°E

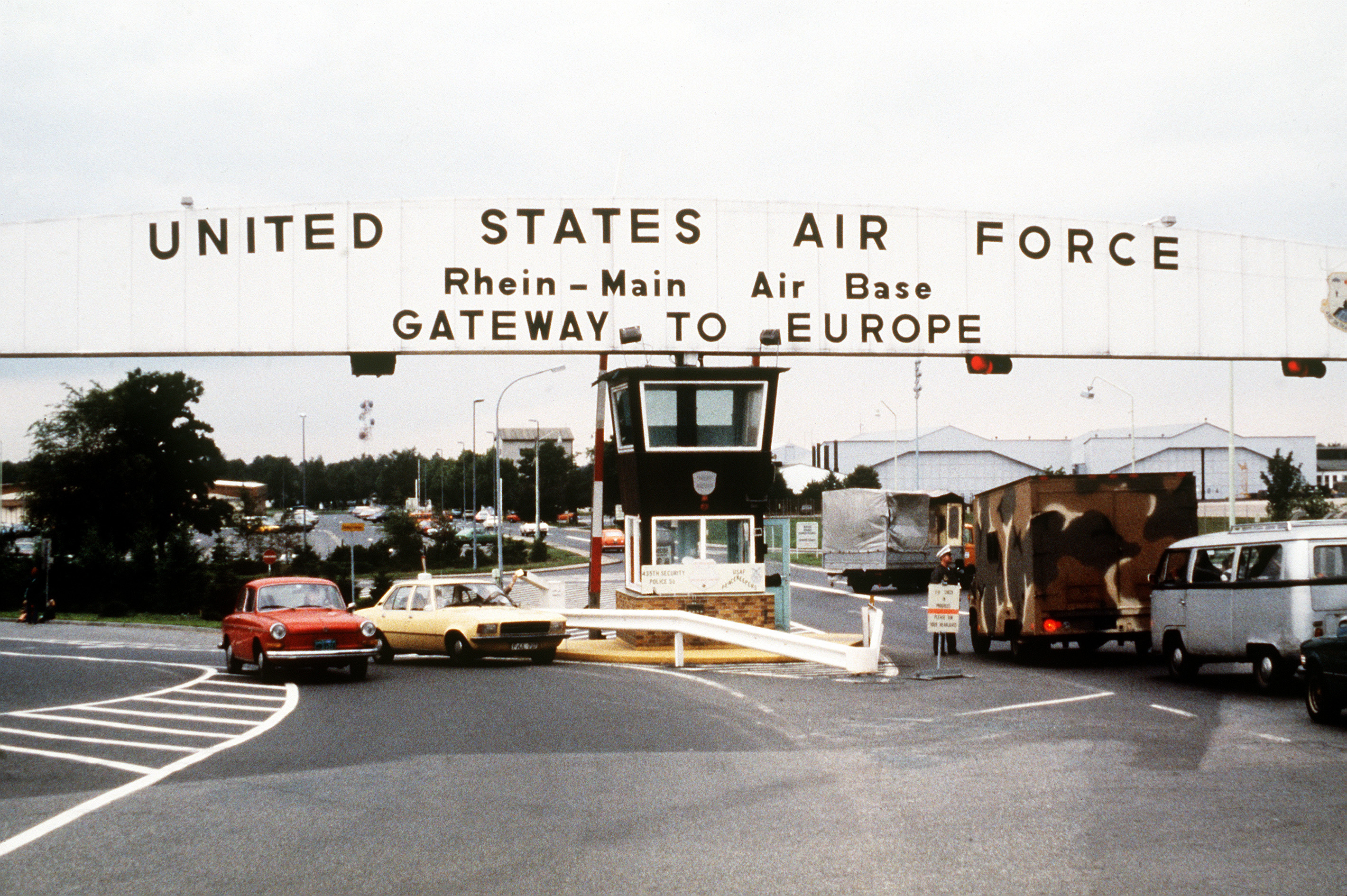
- Entrance to the base, pictured 1980
- Location: Frankfurt am Main, West Germany
- Date: 8 August 1985; 7:15 am (UTC+01:00)
- Target: United States Air Force
- Attack type: terrorist attack
- Weapon: Car bomb
- Deaths: 2
- Injuries: 23
- Perpetrators: Red Army Faction; Action Directe

The Rhein-Main Air Base bombing was a terrorist car bomb attack against the American Rhein-Main Air Base near Frankfurt am Main in West Germany on 8 August 1985. Two Americans were killed and more than 20 people were injured. The blast was powerful and caused debris and damage to the base including to 30 vehicles, trees and windows. The first terrorist bombing had targeted the Officers Club in December 1976 and injured several people.

The attack was orchestrated by the Red Army Faction (RAF) and the French Action Directe groups. It was the worst attack on an American installation in Germany since Ramstein Air Base was bombed in 1981, also by the RAF. The attack came less than two months after the Frankfurt airport bombing, although the two were not related.

In preparation for the attack, RAF members lured and killed American soldier Edward Pimental in Wiesbaden. They used Pimental's identification to gain entry into the air base the next day where they carried out the attack. The bomb was placed in a Volkswagen Passat with fake American military plates.

== Victims ==
One of the fatal victims of the attack was 19-year-old Airman Frank H. Scarton from Woodhaven, Michigan, who was on temporary duty in West Germany and normally serving at Charleston Air Force Base in South Carolina. The other victim was Becky Jo Bristol of San Antonio, Texas, the wife of Senior Airman John Bristol, who served at the Rhein-Main base.

== Aftermath ==
A White House spokesman called it a "shameful attack".

Eva Haule, leader of the RAF, was arrested in 1986. In 1993, by now already serving a 15-year prison sentence for other terror offences, she was tried for the Rhein-Main base attack. Her defending lawyer claimed the attack was a "legitimate means of resistance against American imperialism". She was released on parole in 2007.

== See also ==
- West Berlin discotheque bombing
- 1987 Rheindahlen bombing
- 1988 Naples bombing
