= George A. Speckert =

American classical composer

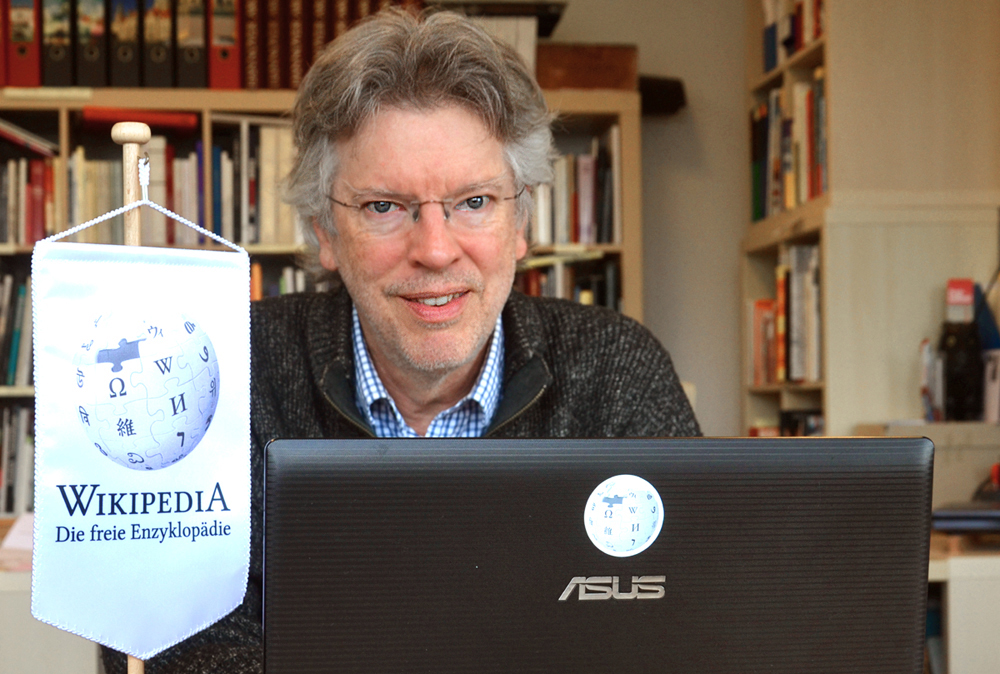
George A. Speckert 2017 in Hannover

George A. Speckert (* 1951 in St. Louis, Missouri, United States) is an American composer, music educator, school principal, author, violist and teacher for film music and media.

== Vita ==
George A. Speckert studied at the University of Evansville of which he spent a time at Harlaxton Campus. He studied viola with Gerald Fischbach and Irene Breslau. He graduated with a Bachelor of Arts cum laude in 1973. In addition he studied composition with Brian Blyth Daubney. His minor was piano.

He participated on master workshops including string pedagogy (Paul Rolland) and Baroque Stylistic (Eduard Melkus) and composition (John Corigliano).

In the 1970s Speckert went to Germany, where he started at the community music school in Bünde-Westfalen (North Germany). In 1976 he was appointed director of the City Music School in Löhne-Westfalen. Four years later he advanced to the City Music School in Bad Salzuflen. In 1984 he was appointed assistant director of the City Music School in Hannover, which he later directed.

In anticipation of the World’s Fair Expo 2000 in Hannover George A. Speckert was awarded the Hannover-Prize in 1996 by Birgit Breuel for his concept “Kulturkaleidoskop – made in Hannover.” In 1998 he was commissioned to organize it. Among other things he developed the first website for the City of Hannover, so that the events could be viewed and booked worldwide.

After the EXPO 2000 Speckert taught multimedia at the community college of Hannover including vocational training, eLearning and a project for schools, community centers and organizations called “Mediabus.” In 2011 the Congress of the Council of Europe awarded his project with the European Award of Excellence City for Children.

In 2002 Speckert started teaching “film music” at the University of Offenburg. Speckert was elected the head of the exam board for digital media design in Hannover in 2005. From 2008 to 2013 he taught multimedia at Bielefeld University.

== Publications (selection) ==
=== Books (in German language) ===
- Hugo Spechtshart – ars nova. Die Entdeckung der Neuen Musik. Eine rekonstruierte Biographie. Florian Noetzel Verlag, Wilhelmshaven, Heinrichshofen-Bücher, 2016, ISBN 978-3-7959-0998-7 and ISBN 3-7959-0998-8; table of contents
- KulturKaleidoskop - made in Hannover : Alternativkultur im Rückenwind der EXPO2000, 1. Auflage, Hamburg: tredition, 2017, ISBN 978-3-7439-5486-1 und ISBN 3-7439-5486-9; table of contents

=== Books (in English language) ===
- Just Another Immigrant: A reconstructed biography, 2016, ISBN 978-1532970382 and ISBN 1532970382
- The First Generation Americans, 2017, ISBN 978-1541106277 and ISBN 154110627X
- Heritage Songs of the Ethical Society, 2017, ISBN 978-1540625830 and ISBN 1540625834
- A High Price for Peace: A common man's account of the 30 Years War, 2018, ISBN 978-1721110612 and ISBN 1721110615

=== Music editions ===
- Ostinati. Spass am Klavier, Probieren, Improvisieren, Fantasieren, Verwandeln. Zimmermann, Frankfurt am Main, ca. 1986
- Indian chants for strings (= Indian chants für Streicher), Kassel [u.a.]: Bärenreiter-Verlag, 2007, ISMN M-006-53426-5
- Tango for strings, Partitur und Stimmen für Tantalizing tango. The smell of tango. Monster tango. The daring white of her eyes. Pizz-a-tango. Roses and thorns. Bärenreiter-Verlag, Kassel [u.a.] 2008, ISMN M-006-53730-3
- Ready to Play. Popular Movie Hits, Bärenreiter-Verlag: Kassel et al., 2012, ISNM 9790006541928

=== Records ===
- Requiem for a World After, Daviton, 1981

=== Film music ===
- Secret Places, University of Evansville, Harlaxton, 2016
- Imagefilm, University of Offenburg, 2014
- Trailer for the film festival up-and-coming, 2013
- Doping in Weinkeller, Behring Filmproduktion, Bayerischer Rundfunk, Norddeutscher Rundfunk, 2003
