= Renate Müller (designer) =

German toy designer

Renate Müller (born 24 October 1945) is a German designer and producer of children's toys from Sonneberg, Thuringia.

== Early life ==
Renate Müller is the daughter of Hildegard and Emil Lindemann. Her interest in toy production ran in the family. Employed at H. Josef Leven's company, her grandfather had worked on the development and production of toys based on progressive educational views. Müller's parents ran a workshop for pedagogically interesting items. From 1964 to 1967, Renate Müller studied design at the Sonneberg College for Applied Arts with Helene Haeusler (1904-1987).

In an interview she said the following about her teacher: “She was influenced by Bauhaus, simple designs and natural materials were her ideal. Already at the end of the 1950s, she brought her students sugar sacks, out of which the first the jute animals stuffed with wood wool were created. In Sonneberg, where everything revolved around plush toys, this material was a provocation. When I started my studies in 1964, it immediately appealed to me.”

== Career ==
In 1967, Müller joined her parents' toy factory. Her father agreed to Haeusler's suggestion to let Renate Müller produce a small series of a sample therapeutic toys, being a small cube by Haeusler, a rhinoceros by Gudrun Metzel, and a duck by Elfriede Fritsche-Bätz. They were first presented to the public at the Leipzig Trade Fair in spring 1967, and multiple doctors attending the fair remarked that the toys could be of use in children's psychiatry and orthopedics. Before receiving the certificate of being valuable in therapy, Müller's toys would be tested at multiple children's clinics and therapeutic institutions. Müller still had the support of Haeusler, who would also travel to West Germany to promote Müller's toys.

In 1972, the company of Müller's parents was collectivized and renamed into VEB Therapeutisches Spielzeug Sonneberg. Müller continued to develop her toys and by 1974 she had added many objects to her repertoire. All the toys were hand-made, for example, a jute turtle with a shell made out of colorful leather patches. Children could hug the turtle, but also use it to sit on. According to Müller, “their contrasting materials, jute – leather, coarse – smooth, warm – cool, were an invitation to touch and ‘grasp’. Their wooden frameworks made them so stable that injuries were impossible.”

The popularity of the toys quickly spread to kindergartens as well, and at the spring fair of 1976, Müller's toys were awarded a golden medal. However, in the same year, the small toy factory was included in the VEB sonni Sonnberg of VEB Spielwaren and Müller was no longer allowed to continue the development of her toys. She joined the GDR's Association of Fine Artists and started to work as a freelance designer. In the years until 1990, Müller designed and realized seventeen playgrounds all over East Germany.

After the Wende, the small workshop was given back to Müller. With the help of the Treuhandanstalt, the artist recovered her copyrights and found the firm named Renate Müller – Spielzeug & Design in 1991. All the toys are still handmade, and older animals can be sent back to be repaired.

The robust animals from Müller's manufactory are now sold worldwide and many of them are used in children's facilities in Japan. The earlier products enjoy great demand from collectors and museums, especially in the United States. The Museum of Modern Art exhibited Müller's toys as part of the Century of a Child Exhibition in 2012. In 2017, a large-scale carpet designed by Renate Müller was exhibited at the Venice Biennale. In 2018, the Kunsthall Stravanger presented a retrospective exhibition of her work titled "Renate Müller: 50 Years of Toys and Design."

== Publications and Links ==
- Renate Müller: Toys + Design, R & Company & Whitehaus Media, 2011, ISBN 978-0970460837.
- Renate Müller's Website
