= 1985 Frankfurt Airport bombing =

Terrorist attack in Germany

Coordinates: 50°02′N 8°34′E

Frankfurt airport bombing
- Location: Frankfurt, West Germany
- Date: 19 June 1985
- Attack type: Bombing
- Deaths: 3
- Injuries: 74
- Perpetrator: Abu Nidal Organization

On the afternoon of 19 June 1985, a bombing at the Frankfurt Airport, West Germany, killed three and wounded 74 people. The bomb had been placed inside a wastepaper basket in the departure lounge at the airport. When it exploded, the blast created a three-foot hole in the concrete floor of the terminal and destroyed many of the airline counters close to the counter of Alitalia Airlines. A police spokesman estimated the size of the bomb as weighing several kilograms. A witness to the explosion described seeing a grey suitcase with two handgrips that probably contained the explosives. Other witnesses described observing a young man who ran away from the scene and fled in a blue Mercedes sedan. Two of those killed were Australian children, 2-year-old and 5-year-old siblings, and the third a Portuguese man.

Shortly after the explosion, a travel agency at the train station in Munich received an anonymous phone call stating that an additional bomb would explode shortly in the departure hall of the Munich Airport. Police evacuated the airport and when no blast occurred, they surmised that the call was a hoax from someone who had heard about the explosion at the Frankfurt Airport.

About 30 groups claimed responsibility, among them an unprecedented group calling itself Arab Revolutionary Organisation, having done so because of West German intelligence recruiting Arabs to assassinate members of Arab revolutionary movements in Lebanon. Other callers claimed responsibility for the explosion on behalf of Red Army Faction, but officials expressed doubt about that group, since the explosion happened in a manner that was not typical for that group. In July 1988, West German investigators concluded that the Palestinian Abu Nidal Organization, which itself had also claimed responsibility, had perpetrated the attack, and that the Libyan embassy in Bonn had pre-knowledge of the attack. The investigators also claimed that Libyan leader Muammar Gaddafi may have played a role in the attack.

== See also ==
- 1985 Rome and Vienna airport attacks
- 1985 Rhein-Main Air Base bombing
- 1986 West Berlin discotheque bombing
