= Office for the Protection of the Constitution of Rhineland-Palatinate =

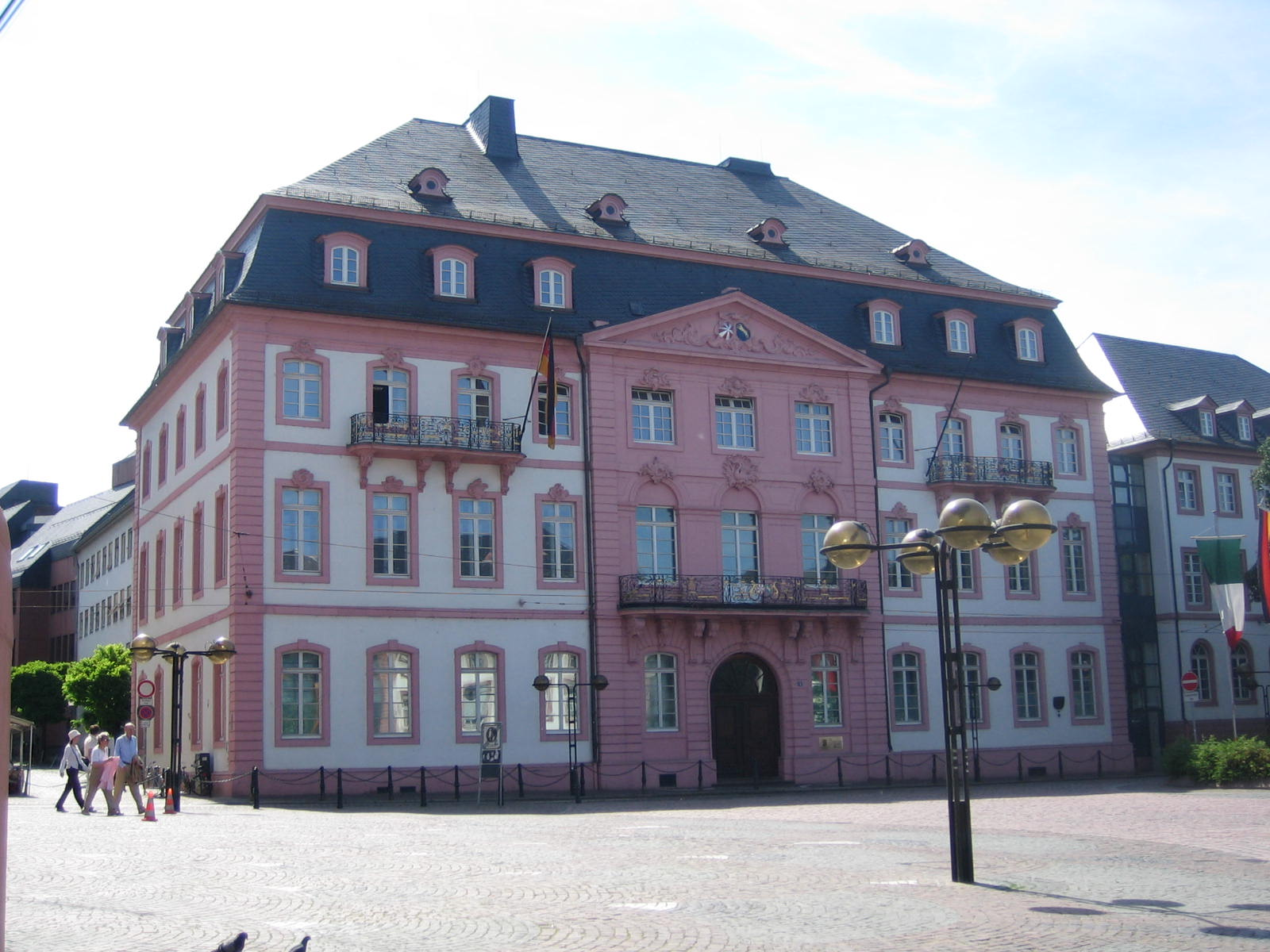
Ministry of the Interior and Sport of the State of Rhineland-Palatinate at Schillerplatz (Mainz)

The Office for the Protection of the Constitution of Rhineland-Palatinate is a department of the Ministry of the Interior and Sport of the State of Rhineland-Palatinate and has the legal mandate to protect the free democratic basic order as well as the existence and security of the federal government and the states. Its headquarters are in Mainz. Since the beginning of 2017, the Office for the Protection of the Constitution in Rhineland-Palatinate has been headed by Elmar May.

== Legal basis ==
The legal basis is the State Constitutional Protection Act of February 11, 2020 (GVBL. 2020, 43), which replaced the old LVerfSchG of July 6, 1998 (GVBl. p. 184). The Rhineland-Palatinate state parliament passed the amendment to the law at the beginning of 2020 in order to take account of the changed security policy challenges and to strengthen parliamentary control of the Office for the Protection of the Constitution. Likewise, the Act on Restrictions on the Secrecy of Mail, Post and Telecommunications, in short: Article 10 Act (G10), in conjunction with a separate state law, applies to the work of the Office for the Protection of the Constitution in Rhineland-Palatinate.

== Duties and powers ==
The most important task of the Office for the Protection of the Constitution in Rhineland-Palatinate is to monitor efforts, i.e. politically determined, targeted and purposeful behavior, that are directed against the free democratic basic order, the existence or security of the federal government or a state. The Office for the Protection of the Constitution also monitors activities in Rhineland-Palatinate that endanger security or are carried out by a foreign power (see Section 5 of the Office for the Protection of the Constitution Act).

Other tasks include assisting in the security screening of persons who are entrusted with facts and information that need to be kept secret in the public interest, or those who can gain access to them (Section 6 of the LVerfSchG).

The Office for the Protection of the Constitution informs the state government, the Ministry of the Interior and Sport informs the public about the main results of the Office for the Protection of the Constitution's work (Section 7 of the Office for the Protection of the Constitution Act). This is done, among other things, in the form of the annual Office for the Annual Report on the Protection of the Constitution.

The authority may use intelligence resources to fulfil its tasks under certain conditions and in compliance with the principle of proportionality. These include, for example, confidential informants, observations and telecommunications surveillance (Section 8 et seq. of the LVerfSchG).

== Control ==
The legally required parliamentary control of the Office for the Protection of the Constitution of Rhineland-Palatinate is carried out by the Parliamentary Control Commission (PKK). G10 measures generally require the prior approval of the so-called G10 Commission, an independent body of its own kind. The State Commissioner for Data Protection and Freedom of Information also has further control rights.

== Organization ==
Department 6 of the Ministry of the Interior, which is responsible for the protection of the Constitution, is divided into the following ten departments:

- Technical analysis support and cross-sectional procedures
- Central tasks
- Fundamental issues, data protection and law, prevention of extremism
- Operational support
- Counter-espionage, secrecy protection, cyber security
- Righ-wing extremism and -terrorism
- Islamic terrorism, Salafism
- Islamism, extremism with foreign secretary
- Left-wing extremism
- News gathering

In recent years, the Office for the Protection of the Constitution in Rhineland-Palatinate has increased its staff numbers. According to the staffing plan, the number of employees was 184 in 2017 and 193 in 2018, but by the end of 2023 there were more than 200.

== History ==
The Rhineland-Palatinate Office for the Protection of the Constitution began its work on January 1, 1951, with an initial staff of five. Due to the situation, the main focus of its work until the 1980s was on monitoring left-wing extremist activities and preventing espionage from the former Eastern Bloc. At the same time, however, combating right-wing extremism was also a central task from the start. Its findings have contributed to the banning of right-wing extremist groups several times since the 1960s, for example of two so-called military sports groups in the Koblenz and Bad Ems areas in 1983 and 1984.

With German reunification, the monitoring of right-wing extremism became more of a focus. Following the terrorist attacks on September 11, 2001 in the United States of America, Islamism became another focus of monitoring. New challenges facing the Rhineland-Palatinate Office for the Protection of the Constitution include the shift of anti-constitutional activities across the entire extremist spectrum to the Internet, the blurring of boundaries, particularly of right-wing extremism, from mainstream society, an increasing rise in antisemitism and an increase in intelligence-led attacks from cyberspace.

In addition, during the Corona pandemic, a new form of extremism has developed in parts of society that is directed against parliamentary democracy and cannot be classified as part of the known phenomena such as right-wing or left-wing extremism.

== Steinmetz case ==
The State Office hit the headlines in 1993 because of its undercover agent Klaus Steinmetz. Steinmetz, who was active in the left-wing scene in Mainz, came into contact with the command level of the Red Army Faction (RAF) in the early 1990s, first with Birgit Hogefeld and then with Wolfgang Grams, which gave state security authorities direct access to the operational level of the Red Army Faction for the first time. It was decided to arrest Hogefeld at a meeting with Steinmetz in June 1993, which was put into action in a major police operation at Bad Kleinen train station on June 27, 1993 (see GSG-9 operation in Bad Kleinen). This led to the arrest of Hogefeld, but also to the death of GSG-9 officer Michael Newrzella in a subsequent exchange of fire; Grams committed suicide. The Rhineland-Palatinate Interior Minister Walter Zuber intended to continue using the undercover agent Steinmetz, which is why his presence at the place of the raid was kept secret from the public until he was unmasked three weeks later, although the media reported on the following day that a third person was present as an undercover agent without naming him. This attempt at secrecy was a major reason for the subsequent political scandal surrounding the failed operation in Bad Kleinen, which was described as a state crisis. The journalist Andreas Förster sees the failure of the constitutional protection authorities in particular in this case as a root of the later right-wing extremist terror of the National Socialist Underground.
