= Michael Newrzella =

German police officer (1967–1993)

- Born: September 15, 1967; Aachen, West Germany
- Died: June 27, 1993 (aged 25); Bad Kleinen, Germany
- Police career
- Department: Grenzschutzgruppe 9
- Service years: 1991–1993

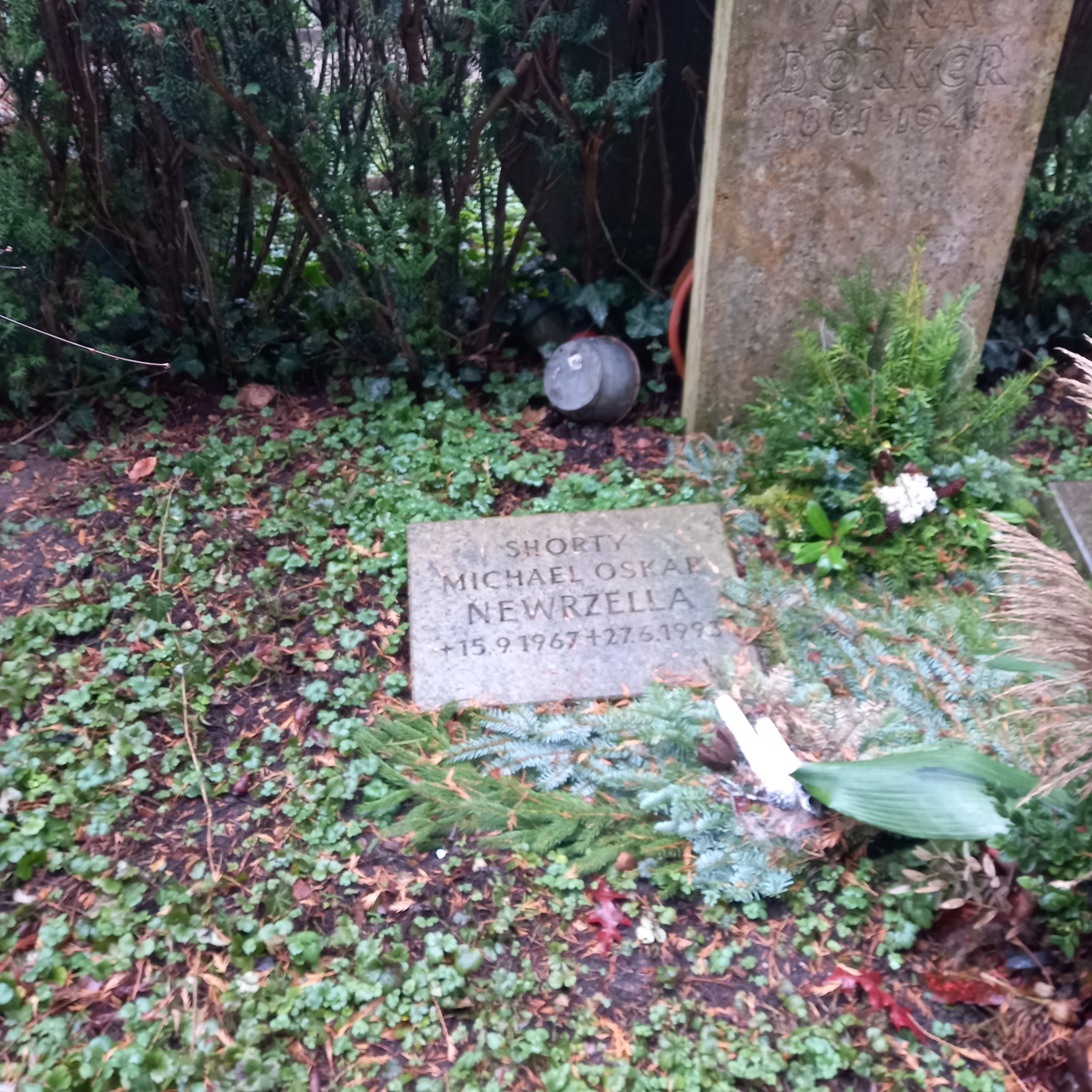
Michael Newrzella's grave at Nienstedten Cemetery, Hamburg

Michael Oskar 'Shorty' Newrzella (September 15, 1967 – June 27, 1993) was a German Federal Border Guard and operative of GSG 9, the counter-terrorism and special operations unit of the Bundesgrenzschutz (Federal Border Guard, BGS). He was killed during an operation against the Red Army Faction in Bad Kleinen, where the terrorists Birgit Hogefeld and Wolfgang Grams were to be arrested after undercover informant Klaus Steinmetz alerted authorities to a planned meeting. Steinmetz was a German V‑Mann (undercover informant) for the Office for the Protection of the Constitution of Rhineland-Palatinate.

== Bad Kleinen operation ==
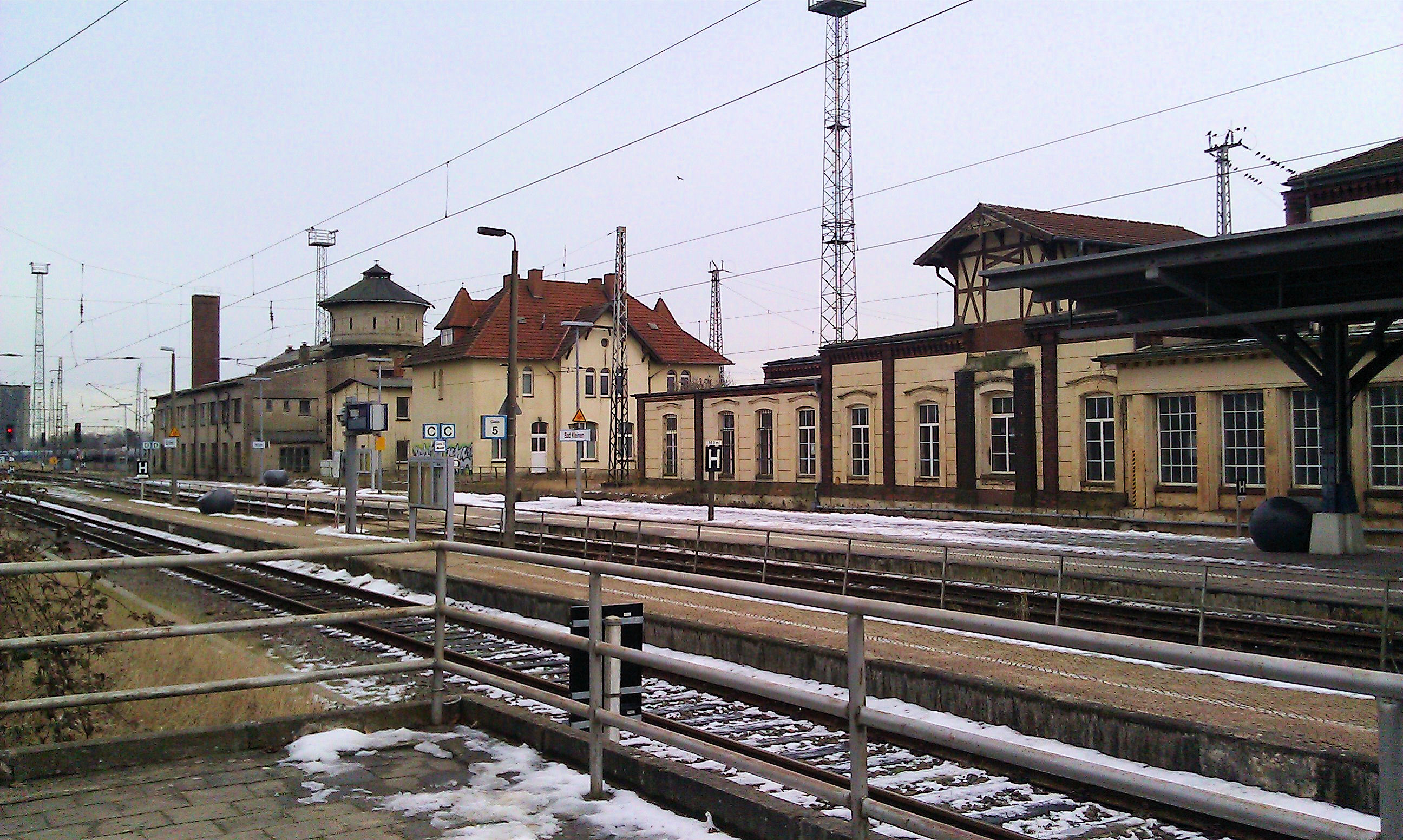
Location of the operation: Bad Kleinen railway station

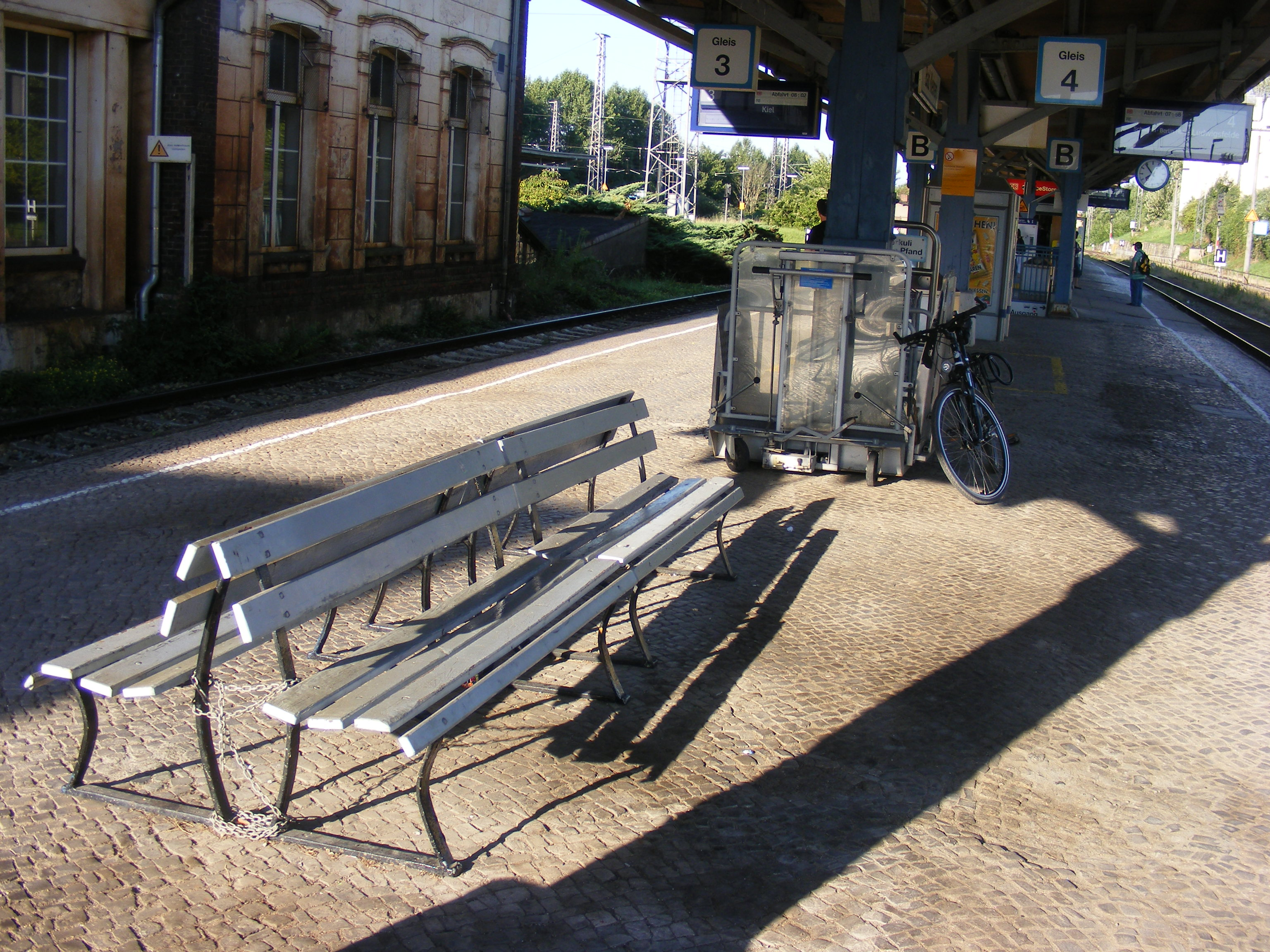
Platform 3/4, where the exchange of gunfire took place, looking toward track bed 4 (right) and the exit of the underpass (centre background). The fully visible person is standing roughly in the position from which Grams fired at his pursuers (photo summer 2008)

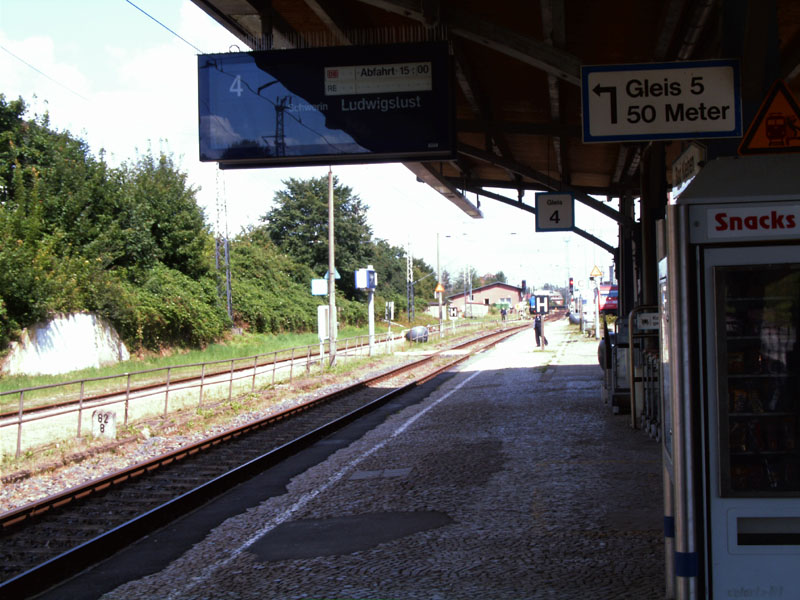
Track 4, onto which Wolfgang Grams fell backward during the exchange of gunfire, seen from the position of the GSG 9 officers at the time (photo August 2011)

On 27 June 1993, Newrzella took part in a joint operation by the Federal Criminal Police Office (BKA) and the Federal Border Guard (BGS), serving as a member of its counter‑terrorism unit GSG 9, to arrest Hogefeld and Grams at the Bad Kleinen train station. As Grams ran up the stairs toward the tracks, six GSG 9 officers pursued him, with Newrzella closest behind. Grams turned and fired ten shots at the officers on the platform, who returned fire. Two officers were injured and collapsed, and Newrzella was struck by four bullets, dying on the platform. Grams fell backward onto the track after being shot in the abdomen and remained lying there. In the immediate aftermath, Grams reportedly attempted to take his own life; he initially survived but died later that day in hospital.

=== Controversy and investigations ===
In the aftermath of the Bad Kleinen operation, allegations emerged that Grams had not shot himself but had been killed at close range by a GSG 9 officer. Questions were raised about whether Grams had been executed, but doubts later emerged about the reliability of this claim and of an anonymous witness statement. Independent investigators from Switzerland concluded that the fatal shot had come from Grams' own weapon, suggesting suicide. Important traces had been compromised; for example, forensic staff had cleaned the right hand of the deceased to obtain clear fingerprints, removing possible gunshot residue that could have supported a suicide finding. Despite these issues, the Staatsanwaltschaft Schwerin (Schwerin public prosecutor's office) investigated the allegations and officially concluded in January 1994 that there were no indications supporting the execution claim. Grams' parents challenged this finding in court, but it was upheld by five different courts, including the European Court of Human Rights in 1999.
