= Wolfgang Grams =

Member of the Red Army Faction (1953–1993)

- Born: March 6, 1953; Wiesbaden, West Germany
- Died: June 27, 1993 (aged 40); Bad Kleinen, Germany
- Cause of death: Suicide by gunshot (disputed, see below)
- Organization: Red Army Faction

Wolfgang Werner 'Gaks' Grams (6 March 1953 – 27 June 1993) was a member of the Red Army Faction (RAF), a German far-left terrorist organization. Grams went underground in 1984 and subsequently belonged to the command level of the RAF's third generation. During an attempt to arrest him by GSG 9, the counter‑terrorism unit of the Federal Border Guard (Bundesgrenzschutz, BGS), in Bad Kleinen, he was shot and, according to the findings of the Staatsanwaltschaft Schwerin (public prosecutor's office in Schwerin)—reviewed multiple times by the courts—died by suicide. The exact circumstances of his death remain disputed. Within parts of the political left, the view persists that Grams was deliberately killed by officers involved in the operation.

== Life ==
Wolfgang Grams was born in Wiesbaden, West Germany. His father, Werner, had volunteered for service in the Waffen-SS during the Second World War. After 1945, he and his wife Ruth fled from the eastern territories. Wolfgang also had a brother named Rainer.

In his youth, the family lived near the Wiesbaden Army Airfield, and Grams took part in protests against the Vietnam War.

While living in a commune, he was given the nickname "Gaks." After the arrest of Andreas Baader and Gudrun Ensslin, he began visiting Red Army Faction (RAF) prisoners, believing the conditions of solitary confinement to be inhumane.

Grams's name was later found in the notebook of an RAF member who was killed during an arrest attempt. He was held in custody for 153 days and received compensation in 1980 for his wrongful detention. He subsequently met Birgit Hogefeld, a leading member of the Red Army Faction (RAF), and began a relationship with her.

Although Grams had been released and compensated for wrongful detention in 1980, investigators later linked him again to RAF circles, and after he went underground in 1984 the Federal Criminal Police Office (BKA) issued a wanted‑person card for him in March 1985. On 15 February 1987, the Tagesschau on ARD broadcast a bulletin on Grams and Hogefeld, describing him as 180 centimetres (5 ft 11 in) tall, with blue‑gray eyes and a distinctive dark spot discoloration on his face. He returned home only once, in the autumn of 1990, to meet his parents in the Taunus region.

Numerous documentaries, books, and articles have examined Grams's alleged involvement in several RAF attacks, including the killings of Gerold von Braunmühl (1986), Alfred Herrhausen (1989), and Detlev Karsten Rohwedder (1991). In 2001, DNA evidence linked Grams to the Rohwedder killing.

== Bad Kleinen operation ==
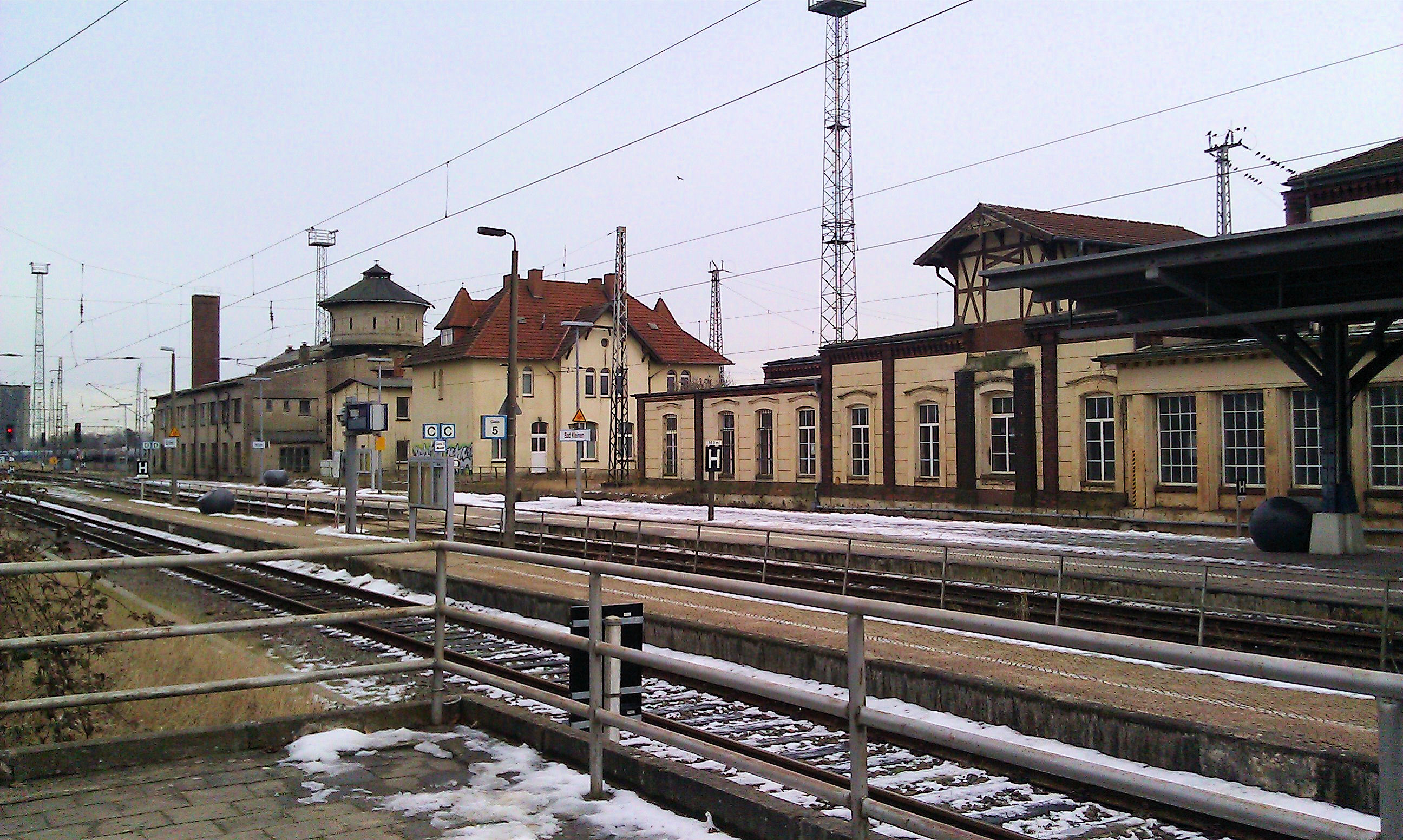
Location of the operation: Bad Kleinen railway station

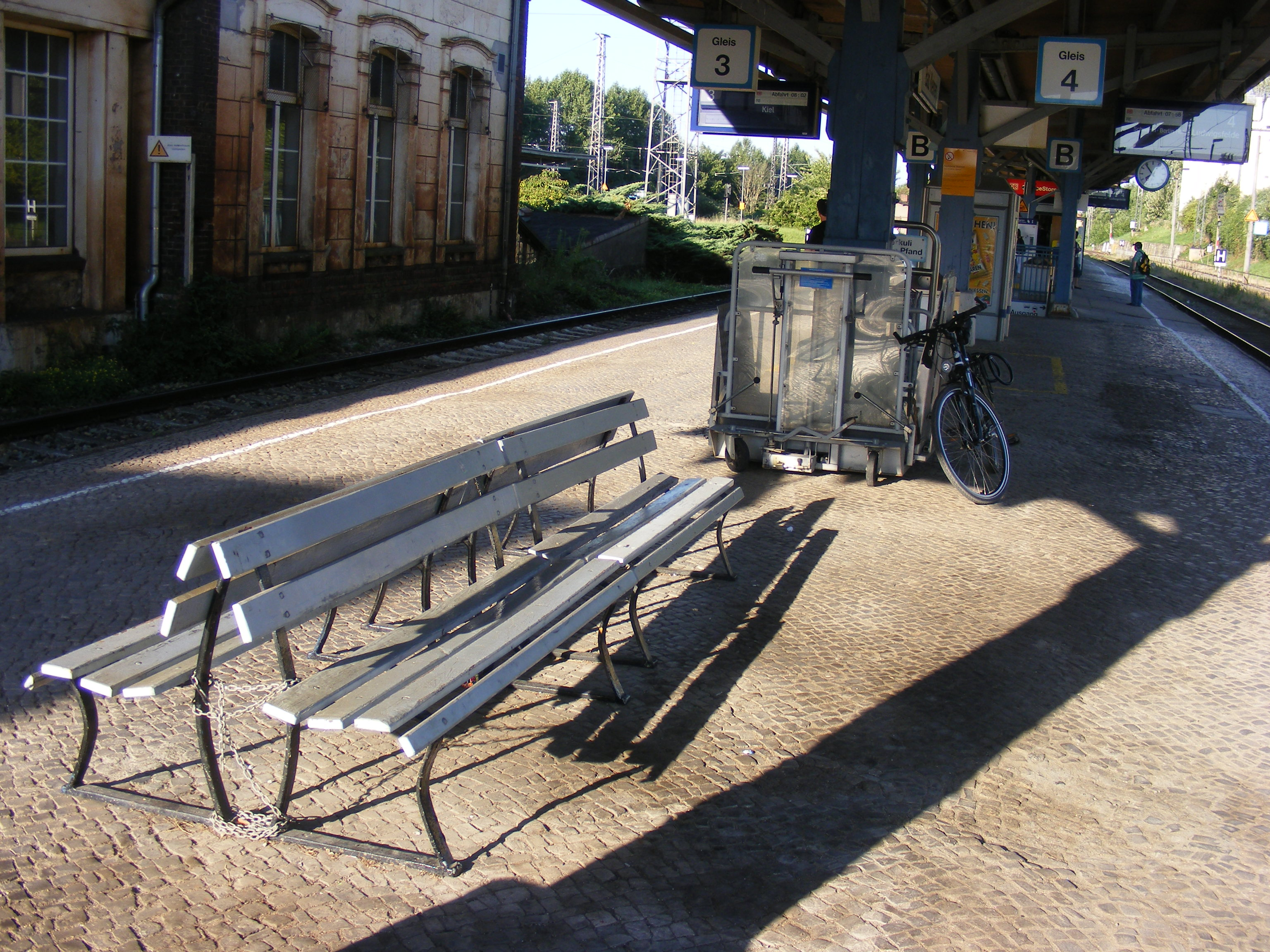
Platform 3/4, where the exchange of gunfire took place, looking toward track bed 4 (right) and the exit of the underpass (centre background). The person in the foreground is standing roughly where Grams fired at his pursuers (photo, summer 2008)

=== Shooting and death ===
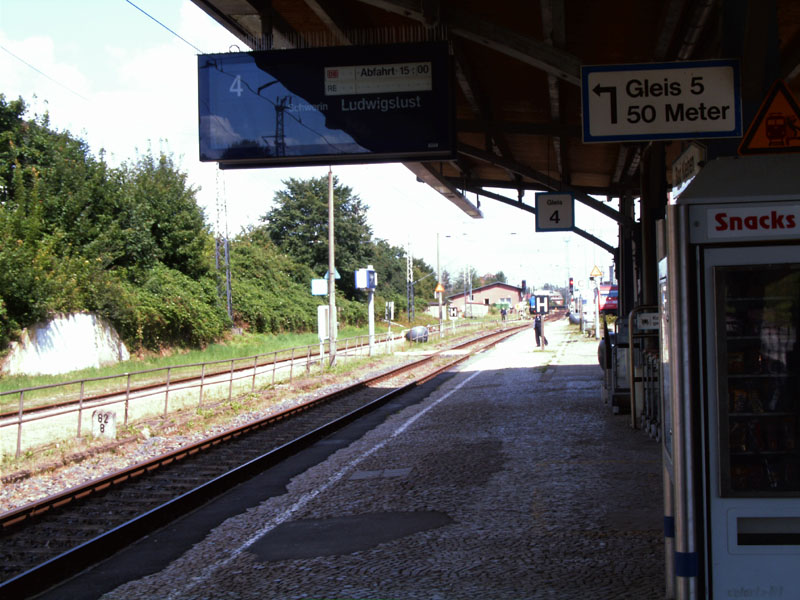
Track 4, onto which Wolfgang Grams fell backward during the exchange of gunfire, seen from the position of the GSG 9 officers at the time (photo, August 2011)

The operation followed a tip‑off from the undercover informant Klaus Steinmetz, who had infiltrated the Red Army Faction (RAF) and alerted authorities to a planned meeting. Steinmetz, who had lured Hogefeld to Mecklenburg and thereby set the Bad Kleinen operation in motion, was a German V‑Mann (undercover informant) for the Office for the Protection of the Constitution of Rhineland-Palatinate. On 27 June 1993, officers from the Federal Criminal Police Office (BKA) and the GSG 9 counter‑terrorism unit of the Federal Border Guard (Bundesgrenzschutz, BGS) were deployed to arrest Grams and Hogefeld at the Bad Kleinen railway station. Hogefeld was armed but did not fire her weapon during the arrest. During the attempted arrest, Grams ran up the stairs toward the tracks, pursued by six GSG 9 officers. He turned and fired ten shots at the officers on the platform, who returned fire. Two officers were injured, and GSG 9 officer Michael Newrzella was struck by four bullets and died on the platform. Grams fell backward onto the track after being shot in the abdomen and remained lying there. In the immediate aftermath, he reportedly attempted to take his own life; he was airlifted to the Medizinische Universität zu Lübeck, where he died later that day from a head wound that forensic examiners later determined to be self‑inflicted.

=== Controversy and investigations ===
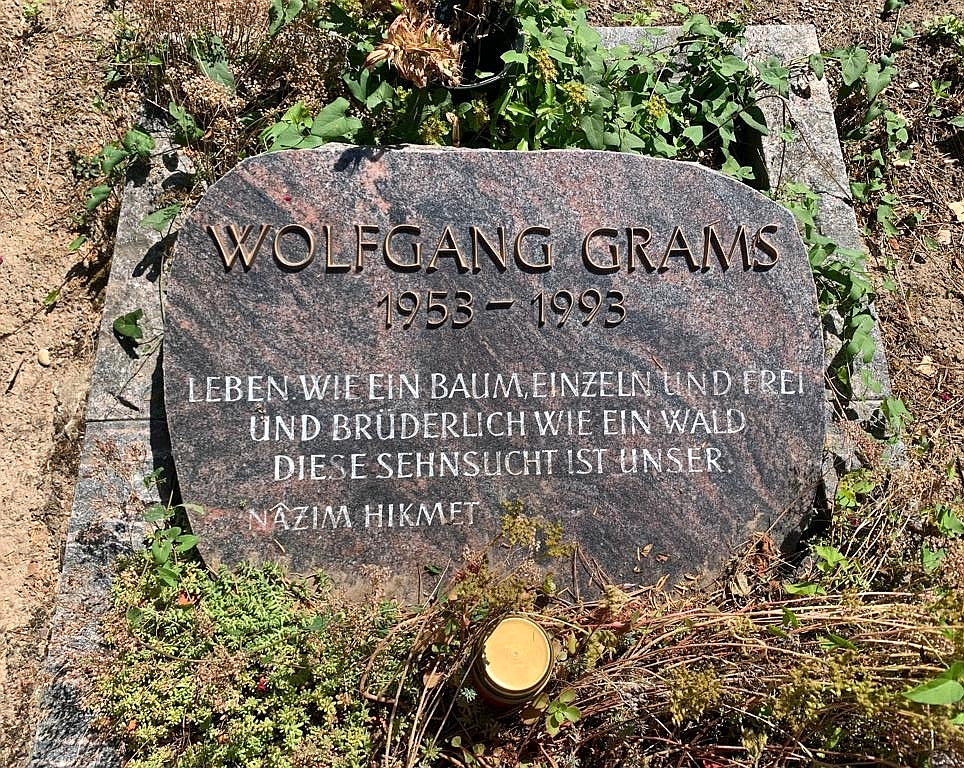
Grams was buried on 6 August 1993 in an urn burial plot at the Wiesbaden South Cemetery

Shortly after the operation, allegations emerged that Grams had not shot himself but had been executed with a close‑range shot to the head by a GSG 9 officer. The allegation originated from a woman working at the station's kiosk, her account was recorded as an anonymous witness statement and was later deemed unreliable by investigators. Her account only became public when it was broadcast by the ARD television magazine Monitor, which in turn challenged the official version of events. Shortly afterwards, however, it became clear that the Monitor report was incorrect, and the allegation was later disproven by forensic and judicial investigations. Der Spiegel subsequently published an analysis of how the false claims had been disseminated at the time. In later years, outlets such as Cicero argued that it was "the media" itself that had misrepresented the Bad Kleinen case. Independent investigators from Switzerland concluded that the fatal shot had come from Grams' own weapon, suggesting suicide. Some forensic traces had been compromised; for example, the right hand of the deceased had been cleaned to obtain clear fingerprints, removing possible gunshot residue that could have supported a suicide finding. Despite these issues, the Staatsanwaltschaft Schwerin (public prosecutor's office in Schwerin) investigated the allegations and concluded in January 1994 that there were no indications supporting the execution claim. Grams' parents challenged this conclusion in court, but it was upheld by five different courts, including the European Court of Human Rights in 1999.

=== Political consequences ===
Interior Minister Rudolf Seiters took responsibility for the poor conduct and handling of the operation and resigned in July of that year, as did Chief Federal Prosecutor Alexander von Stahl. Chancellor Helmut Kohl visited the GSG 9 unit, praised Officer Newrzella, and discouraged "attempts to portray Grams — who had killed Newrzella — as a martyr."

== In popular culture ==
- The award‑winning 2001 German documentary film Black Box BRD explores the lives and deaths of Wolfgang Grams and Alfred Herrhausen, the Deutsche Bank chairman whose assassination Grams is suspected of involvement in.
- The incident has been referenced and criticised in German punk rock songs, including 'Kopfschuss' ('Head Shot') by WIZO, 'Bad K.' (a reference to Bad Kleinen) by Dritte Wahl, and 'Gewalt' ('Violence') by Slime.
