= Birgit Breuel =

German politician

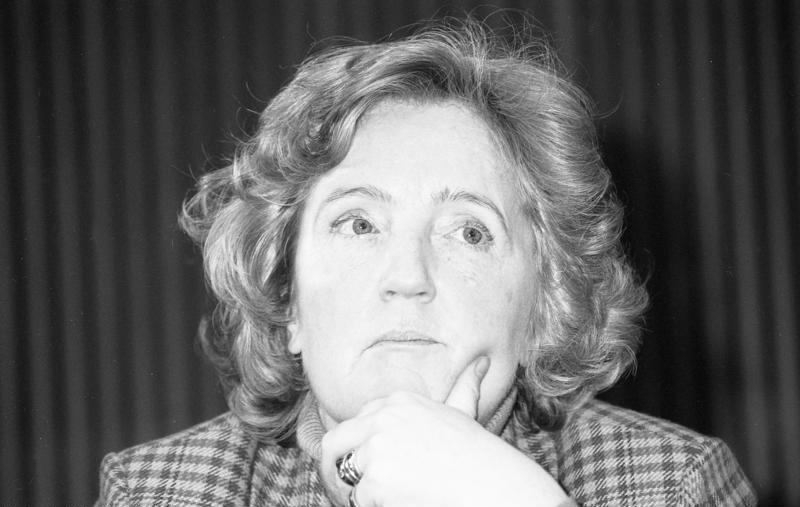
- Breuel in June 1991

President of the Treuhandanstalt
- In office 13 April 1991 – 31 December 1994
- Appointed by: Helmut Kohl
- Deputy: Heinrich Hornef
- Preceded by: Detlev Rohwedder
- Succeeded by: Heinrich Hornef (as President of the Bundesanstalt für vereinigungsbedingte Sonderaufgaben)

Minister of Finance of Lower Saxony
- In office 9 July 1986 – 21 June 1990
- Minister-President: Ernst Albrecht
- Preceded by: Burkhard Ritz
- Succeeded by: Hinrich Swieter

Minister for Economics and Transportation of Lower Saxony
- In office 28 June 1978 – 9 July 1986
- Minister-President: Ernst Albrecht
- Preceded by: Erich Küpker
- Succeeded by: Walter Hirche (Economy, Technology and Transport)

Member of the Hamburg Parliament
- In office 14 April 1970 – 28 June 1978
- Preceded by: multi-member district
- Succeeded by: Manfred Sander
- Constituency: Christian Democratic Union List

Personal details
- Born: Birgit Münchmeyer; 7 September 1937 (age 88) Hamburg-Rissen, Nazi Germany (now Germany)
- Party: Christian Democratic Union
- Spouse: Ernst-Jürgen Breuel (m. 1959)
- Education: University of Hamburg (no degree); University of Oxford (no degree); University of Geneva (no degree)
- Occupation: Politician; retail merchant; Executive

Birgit Breuel (née Münchmeyer; born 7 September 1937 in Hamburg-Rissen) is a German politician of the Christian Democratic Union (CDU) who served as president of the Treuhand Agency and as Commissioner General of Expo 2000 in Hannover. She later worked in several honorary positions.

== Early life and education ==
Birgit Münchmeyer came from a Lower Saxony family of traders and private bankers. She is the daughter of merchant bankers who owned the bank Münchmeyer & Co.. On 8 August 1959 she married the Hamburg merchant Ernst-Jürgen Breuel (born 7 October 1931 in Hamburg).

Breuel studied political science at the Universities of Hamburg, Oxford and Geneva.

== Political career ==
=== Career in state politics ===
In 1966, Breuel entered into the CDU. From 1978 to 1986 she was State Minister of Economy and Transport in Lower Saxony, then to 1990 was the State Minister of Finance in the cabinet of Minister-President Ernst Albrecht. She also served on the boards of various German corporations, including Volkswagen.

=== Treuhandanstalt ===
In 1990, Breuel was elected to the executive board of the Treuhand - a holding firm responsible for the sale of East German state assets. A year later she became the successor of Detlev Karsten Rohwedder. While Rohwedder had been cautious about the sale of most state assets, favouring a worker-owned solution if possible, Breuel favoured quick privatization. She departed in 1995 from this office.

=== Expo 2000 ===
Breuel then became Commissioner-General of the World Expo Expo 2000 in Hanover.

== Literature ==
- Birgit Breuel (Hg.): Ohne historisches Vorbild. Die Treuhandanstalt 1990 bis 1994 - eine kritische Würdigung. Berlin 2005 ISBN 3-936962-15-4
- Deutsches Geschlechterbuch. Band 128 der Gesamtreihe (Hamburg Band 10), p. 69/70, C. A. Starke Verlag, Limburg (Lahn) 1962, ISSN 1438-7972.

== See also ==
- List of German Christian Democratic Union politicians
