= Eva Haule =

German terrorist (born 1954)

- Born: 16 July 1954 (age 72); Tübingen, West Germany
- Organization: Red Army Faction

Eva Sybille Haule-Frimpong (born 16 July 1954) is a German former terrorist associated with the third generation Red Army Faction (RAF). She took her abitur in Stuttgart before going underground in 1984.

== Terrorist activities ==
- On 5 November 1984, Haule raided an arms dealer in Maxdorf near Ludwigshafen. Handguns, rifles and ammunition were stolen.
- On 18 December of the same year, Haule was implicated in a plot to bomb a NATO school in Oberammergau. She allegedly parked a car full of explosives outside the school, however the attack failed due to a technical glitch.
- On 1 February 1985, Haule was involved in the assassination of Ernst Zimmerman, in Gauting. Zimmerman was chairman of the board of the aircraft engine manufacturer MTU, he was shot through the head in his home. He was 55 at the time of his death.
- On 8 August 1985, Haule, along with Birgit Hogefeld, was involved in the murder of US Army specialist Edward Pimental. Haule and Hogefeld stole his I.D. to access the grounds of the U.S. Rhein-Main Air Base near Frankfurt.
- Also in August of that year, Haule was implicated in a bomb attack on the aforementioned U.S. airbase, which killed A1C Frank Scarton and Becky Jo Bristol and left 20 others injured.

== Arrest and imprisonment ==
Haule was arrested in an ice-cream parlour in Rüsselsheim on 2 August 1986. She was charged with the failed bomb attack in Oberammergau as well as membership in a criminal organisation, robbery and falsification of documents. On 28 June 1988 she was sentenced to 15 years imprisonment.

Haule was due for release in 2001, but charges for the Rhein-Main Air Base bombing and murder of American soldier Edward Pimental were brought against her. New evidence, which included Haule's own letters to another RAF member in prison containing self-incriminating information, were used to prove her guilt. Her sentence was extended, and she was moved to a women's prison in Neukölln. She stated that 'an end to her detention was not foreseeable.'

Parole was granted on 17 August 2007, with her release set for 21 August. However, officials released her on the 17th in order to protect her from the media. She has never expressed remorse for her actions as a member of the RAF.

== Photography ==
Haule attended photography classes in prison and now takes portraits of other imprisoned women. Her collection, called "Portraits of Women under Captivity", has been exhibited.
