= Edward Pimental =

American terrorism victim (1965–1985)

Edward F. Pimental
- Born: 19 June 1965; Fall River, Massachusetts, United States
- Died: 8 August 1985 (aged 20); Wiesbaden, West Germany
- Military career
- Allegiance: United States
- Branch: US Army
- Rank: Specialist

Edward F. Pimental (June 19, 1965 – August 8, 1985) was an American soldier of the United States Army who was murdered by the Red Army Faction in West Germany.

== Biography ==
Pimental was born on June 19, 1965, in Fall River, Massachusetts, and raised in New York City. He joined the United States Army and was assigned to the 563rd Ordnance Company, which was located at Camp Pieri in Wiesbaden, West Germany.

== Death ==
On the night of August 7, 1985, Pimental and other American soldiers visited the Western Saloon nightclub in Wiesbaden, where he was invited by a woman to walk her home, leaving the bar with her. The woman was Birgit Hogefeld, a member of the Red Army Faction, a militant far-left organization that carried out attacks against American military targets in West Germany.

Pimental was killed by a shot to the head in the nearby woods, and his U.S. military identification card was stolen. Pimental's identification card was used the next morning by a male Red Army Faction member to gain access to the Rhein-Main Air Base and place a car bomb. A Volkswagen Passat loaded with about 240 kg of explosives was detonated at the base, resulting in the death of two American servicemen, the wounding of eleven, and substantial material damage. A "Command George Jackson" claimed responsibility in a letter signed by the Red Army Faction and the French Action directe armed group, reaching the Frankfurter Rundschau desk and two news agencies the same day. Pimental's stolen identification card was sent to Reuters in Frankfurt on August 13.

== Aftermath ==
The murder of Edward Pimental caused heated discussions in the far-left circles in West Germany because it was the first time a person without major political or economic status was killed deliberately, contradicting the legacy of the 1968 movement. The Red Army Faction attempted to justify the murder by proclaiming Pimental as a "contract warmonger" for being a voluntary member of the United States military, but they later referred to it as a "mistake". In 1994 and 1996, Hogefeld and Eva Haule were convicted of participation in the murder of Pimental and sentenced to life imprisonment by the Frankfurt Higher Regional Court. Haule was released on parole in 2007, while Hogefeld was eventually freed in 2011, being the last member of the Red Army Faction to leave prison.
