= Detlev Karsten Rohwedder =

President of the Treuhandanstalt

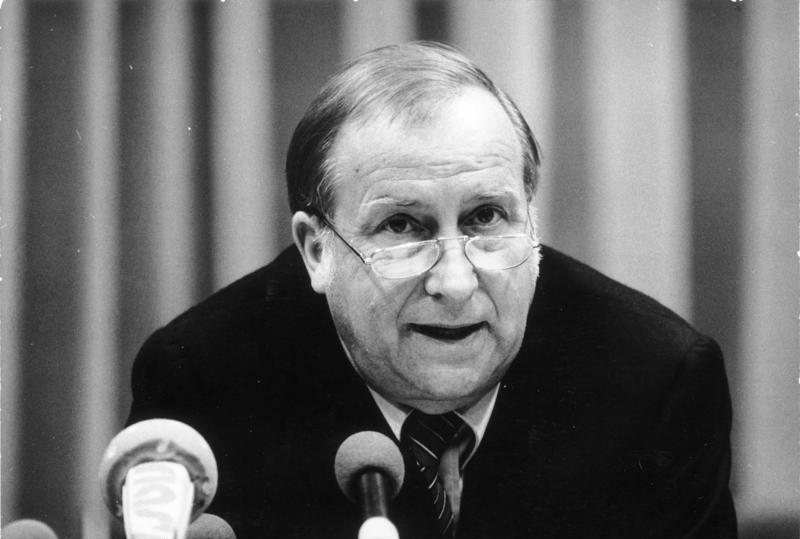
- Rohwedder in 1990

President of the Treuhandanstalt
- In office 29 August 1990 – 1 April 1991
- Appointed by: Lothar de Maizière
- Preceded by: Reiner Maria Gohlke
- Succeeded by: Birgit Breuel

State Secretary in the Ministry for Economics
- In office 22 October 1969 – 16 February 1978
- Chancellor: Willy Brandt; Helmut Schmidt
- Minister: Karl Schiller; Helmut Schmidt; Hans Friderichs; Otto Graf Lambsdorff
- Preceded by: Klaus von Dohnanyi
- Succeeded by: Dieter von Würzen (1979)

Personal details
- Born: 16 October 1932 Gotha, Free State of Thuringia, Weimar Republic
- Died: 1 April 1991 (aged 58) Düsseldorf-Niederkassel, North Rhine-Westphalia, Germany
- Cause of death: Assassination by gunshots
- Party: Social Democratic Party

Detlev Karsten Rohwedder (16 October 1932 – 1 April 1991) was a German manager and politician, as member of the Social Democratic Party. He was named president of the Treuhandanstalt, the agency responsible for the reprivatization/privatization of all state-owned property in the former German Democratic Republic (GDR), in September 1990, and served until his assassination by a far-left terrorist organization, the Red Army Faction, in April 1991. He had also been CEO of the steel manufacturer Hoesch AG since 1980.

== Death ==
On Monday, 1 April 1991, at 23:30, Rohwedder was shot and killed through a window on the second floor of his home in the suburb of Düsseldorf-Niederkassel (Kaiser-Friedrich-Ring 71) by the first of three rifle shots. The second shot wounded his wife Hergard; the third hit a bookcase.

The shots were fired from 63 m (207 ft) away from a rifle chambered in 7.62×51mm NATO. It was the same rifle that was used during a sniper attack on the American embassy in February committed by the Red Army Faction (RAF), a West German far-left terrorist group. An inspection of the scene found three cartridge cases, a plastic chair, a towel, and a letter claiming responsibility from an RAF unit named after Ulrich Wessel, a minor RAF figure who had died in 1975. The shooter has never been identified.

=== Investigation ===
In 2001, a DNA analysis found that hair strands from the crime scene belonged to RAF member Wolfgang Grams. The Attorney General did not consider this evidence sufficient to name Grams as a suspect in the killing. Grams was killed in a shootout with police in Bad Kleinen in 1993.

On 10 April 1991, Rohwedder was honoured in Berlin with a day of mourning by German President Richard von Weizsäcker, Minister-President of North Rhine-Westphalia, Johannes Rau, and Chairman of the Board of Treuhandanstalt Jens Odewald. The Detlev-Rohwedder-Haus, the seat of the Federal Finance Ministry, is named in his honour.

== Films ==
In 2020, A Perfect Crime, a documentary about the Rohwedder assassination, was released by Netflix.

== See also ==
- Birgit Breuel
