= Nadir (web portal) =

Nadir.org is a German web portal, based in Hamburg. It sees itself as "an information system to leftist politics and social movements in the internet". It is one of the oldest German organisations of left groups and for initiatives-based websites. Since 2006, new entries were largely adjusted and a manifesto against retention was published in October 2008. Gradually, it was replaced by the open information platform indymedia. Topics included were anti-fascism, anti-racism and work against sexism.

In particular, the magazines Radikale Zeiten, the "Rote Hilfe Zeitung", Gegendruck, Zeck and Interim were collected electronically.

The term "nadir" means "a point to which a central perspective in an infinitely long distance converges", in the Arabic language "a vanishing point at infinity".

== Assessment of the constitutional protection of North Rhine-Westphalia ==
The Hamburg-based news portal was used, according to the Annual Report of the State Office for the Protection of North Rhine-Westphalia 2004, by left-wing extremists and is referred to as "the oldest left-wing extremist portal".

== Sources ==
- Providers in retention between two stools
- Tilman Baumgärtel: Linke on the Internet
- To the name nadir, www.nadir.org
- Virtual Subversion, www.nadir.org
- Internet and electronic communications, Ministry of the Interior of North Rhine-Westphalia
- Constitutional Protection Report of the State of North Rhine-Westphalia, about the year 2004, p. 151
