= Treuhandanstalt =

East German government agency

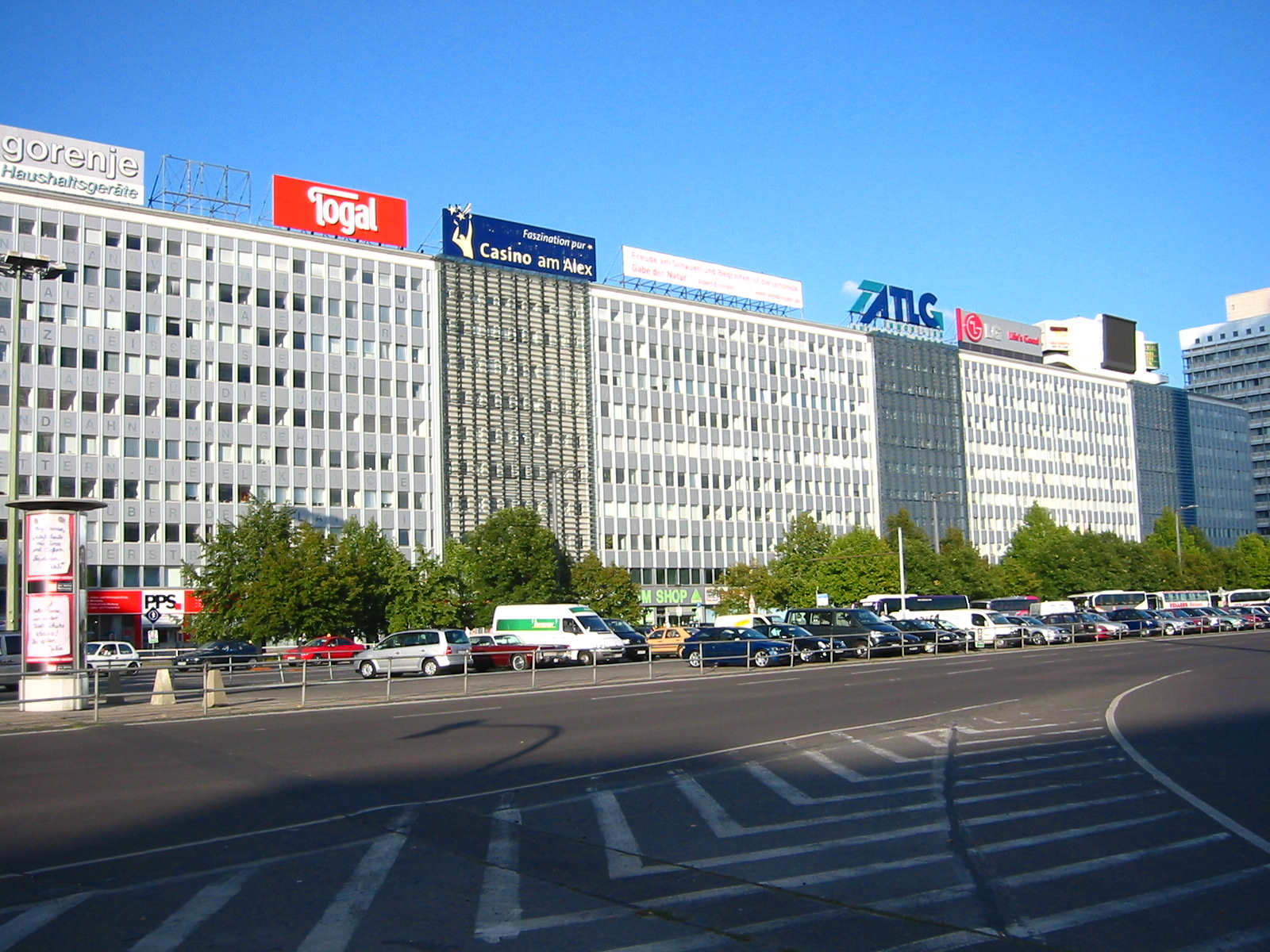
The Treuhandanstalt headquarters at Alexanderplatz in Berlin.

The Treuhandanstalt (German: [ˈtʁɔɪ̯hantˌʔanʃtalt], "Trust agency"), colloquially referred to as Treuhand, was a government agency of the German Democratic Republic (East Germany) from June to October 1990 and reunified Germany from 1990 to 1994, responsible for the reprivatisation/privatisation of the Volkseigene Betriebe (VEBs) and other state-owned enterprises in East Germany.

The Treuhand was established by the Volkskammer of East Germany during Die Wende, to oversee the restructure and sale of about 8,500 state-owned companies with over four million employees – the world's largest industrial enterprise, controlling everything from steel works to the Babelsberg Studios. It inherited the assets of the Socialist Unity Party of Germany and other East German government agencies after German reunification in October 1990. The Treuhand was dissolved by the Federal Government of Germany on 1 January 1995 and reconstituted as the Federal Agency for Special Tasks Related to Unification (Bundesanstalt für vereinigungsbedingte Sonderaufgaben) which was active until 2000.

The Treuhand has faced criticism and opposition for its handling of the privatisation process in the former East Germany, particularly for excessive liquidation and the resulting layoffs. On 1 April 1991, Treuhand chairman Detlev Karsten Rohwedder was assassinated by the Red Army Faction (RAF), a West German far-left terrorist group sponsored and supported by the East German Stasi. The shooter has never been identified.

== Context ==
The German Democratic Republic (East Germany) was a Marxist-Leninist communist state that utilised a planned economy based on economic policies set by the ruling Socialist Unity Party of Germany (SED). The vast majority of the economy belonged to state-owned enterprises known as Volkseigene Betriebe (VEBs), which were under the control of the State Planning Commission of the Council of Ministers. The SED allocated investment into certain industries based on its economic policies, rather than based on the supply and demand of the market. While East Germany was able to maintain a modest economic growth and an increase in living standards, it was unable to keep pace with the spending growth of the welfare state needed to maintain those living standards. A growing proportion of investment funds were consumed by the ever-expanding and costly welfare state. The SED attempted to fuel economic growth with foreign loans, but the economy actually headed towards stagnation and led to a severe debt crisis that only starved East German industries even further.

By the time of Die Wende and the fall of the SED regime in 1989, East Germany's industries were significantly labour intensive and underdeveloped compared to those in the Federal Republic of Germany (West Germany), which made many of them unprofitable and indebted. The de Maizière cabinet, the first non-socialist government of East Germany, decided on a mass privatisation of these industries.

== Responsibilities ==
The Treuhand was responsible for more than just the 8,500 state-owned enterprises. It also took over around 2.4 million hectares of agricultural land and forests, the property of the former Stasi, large parts of the property of the former National People's Army, large-scale public housing property, and the property of the state pharmacy network.

On 3 October 1990, the day of reunification, it took over the property of the SED, as well as the other political parties and the mass organisations of the National Front.

== Opposition ==
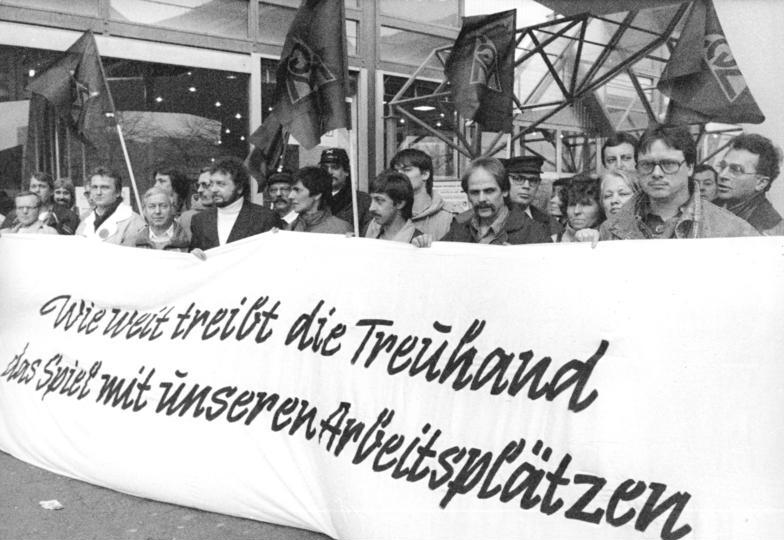
Steel workers protest in Berlin in front of the Treuhand, December 1990.

The Treuhand's operations drew criticism for unnecessarily closing allegedly profitable businesses, misuse and waste of funds, and layoffs that were claimed to be unnecessary. It also drew substantial protest from the workforces affected, as 2.5 million employees in state-owned enterprises (out of 4 million in total) were laid off in the early 1990s. Supporters argued that not placing the former state-owned enterprises into private hands would have caused the loss of many more jobs and slowed economic recovery.

On 1 April 1991, chairman of the Treuhand Detlev Karsten Rohwedder was shot dead by an unknown assassin (possibly the Red Army Faction). He was succeeded by Birgit Breuel.

The trust itself was extraordinarily unprofitable, such that, when its operations ended in 1994, it had amassed 260 to 270 billion DM in debt, equal to around 350 billion United States dollars in 2025.

== Successors ==
Total land sales by the BVVG amounted to around half the area of the state of Saxony-Anhalt

Although the Treuhand ceased operations in 1994, it still retained much property and some other legal responsibilities. These were transferred to three successor agencies:

- the Bundesanstalt für vereinigungsbedingte Sonderaufgaben, BvS (Federal Agency for Unification-related Special Tasks), which managed remaining state-owned enterprises:
- the Treuhandliegenschaftsgesellschaft (now TLG Immobilien GmbH), which manages the remaining state-owned urban and industrial real estate.
- the Bodenverwertungs- und -verwaltungs GmbH (BVVG), a subsidiary of the Treuhand created in 1992, which manages the state-owned agricultural land, forest lands, and related real estate.

The BvS ceased operations at the end of 2000, but it remains legally in existence; its remaining tasks are all delegated to other bodies. TLG and BVVG remain the largest real estate owners in the new federal states. In 2000, TLG was reoriented from focussing on privatisation of its assets to "active portfolio management" with a view to making profits for the German federal government. By 2007, having sold 45,000 properties in six years and reinvested 1.5 billion euros, it was still managing 1500 properties worth 1.4 billion euros. The planned privatisation of TLG itself was put on hold in July 2008 because of adverse economic conditions. In January 2020, TLG Immobilien was acquired by the Luxembourg-domiciled property company Aroundtown.

In July 2008, the BVVG announced total privatization receipts of 3.5 billion euros since its establishment in 1992, which it had gained through the sale of around 525,000 hectares (1,300,000 acres) of agricultural land, with a similar amount of forest land and a small amount of other land. Total land sales amounted to around half the area of the state of Saxony-Anhalt. At the end of 2007, it still owned over 500,000 hectares (1,200,000 acres) of agricultural land and just under 100,000 hectares (250,000 acres) of forest land.
